= Frode Alnæs =

Norwegian jazz guitarist and composer

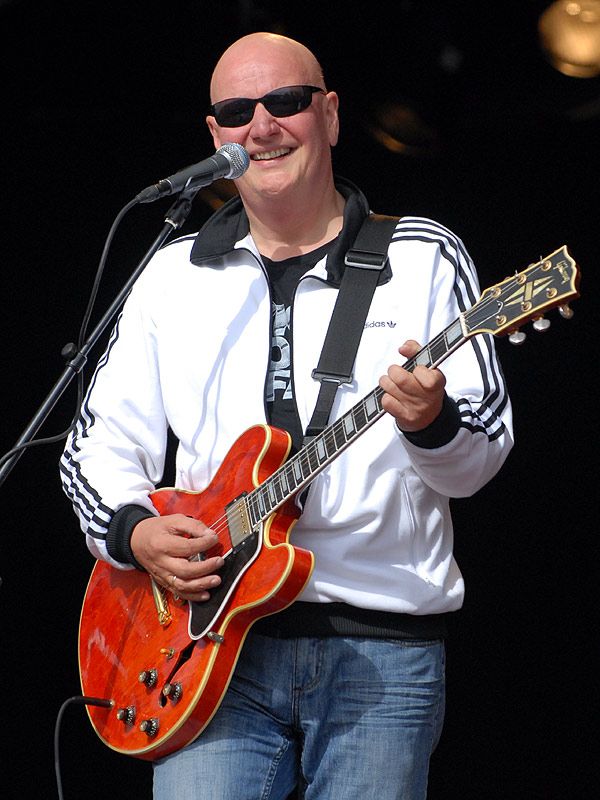
- Frode Alnæs during a concert with Dance with a Stranger (Photo: Bjarte Hetland)

Background information
- Born: 3 March 1959 (age 67); Kristiansund, Norway
- Genre: Jazz
- Occupations: Musician, composer
- Instrument: Guitar
- Website: frodealnaes.no

Frode Alnæs (born 3 March 1959) is a Norwegian jazz guitarist and composer, known from cooperation with international artists like Morten Harket, Magne Furuholmen, Arild Andersen, Jon Balke, Ole Edvard Antonsen, Ketil Bjørnstad, Henning Sommerro, Ray Charles, Dee Dee Bridgewater, Ian Hunter, Bjørn Alterhaug, Sissel Kyrkjebø, Gustav Lorentzen, and Jan Erik Vold, and appearances in bands like Dance with a Stranger, Masqualero, Jazzpønkensemblet, and Sidsel Endresen Quartet.

== Career ==
Alnæs was born in Kristiansund. After completing high school in Kristiansund, he attended the Nordmøre Music Folk High School in Surnadal 1978–79, followed by studies in Trondheim (1979–82), together with Tore Brunborg and Nils Petter Molvær. He was among the first to graduate from the Jazz program at the Trondheim Musikkonservatorium in 1982, where he received top marks in guitar playing. In 1987 Alnæs composed the music to rock opera Klæppfesk.

Alnæs was band leader at Moldejazz (1992 and 1994) and at Vossajazz 1993, and appeared with Arild Andersen and Rune Arnesen as a trio at Kongsberg Jazz Festival 1995. In 1996 he attended the Vossajazz with Fliflet/Hamre Energiforsyning, and with The Brazz Bros at Moldejazz (1997).

== Honors ==
- Spellemannprisen (1987) in the class Pop, for the album Dance with a Stranger
- Spellemannprisen (1989) in the class Pop, for the album Dance with a Stranger
- Spellemannprisen (1994) as This year's Spellemann, with Dance with a Stranger
- Kreditkassens kulturpris
- Fylkeskulturprisen i Møre og Romsdal
- COOP Norges Musikkpris 2001
- Orkidéprisen 2002
- Kristiansund-prisen 2002
- Fortidsminneforeningens Bevaringspris 2002, for Dødeladen og Tollboden i Kristiansund
- Årets Medmenneske (Røde Kors) 2001
- Årets Gromgutt i Møre og Romsdal

== Discography ==
=== Solo albums ===
- 1996: Frode (Universal)
- 2013: Envy The Man (Big Box)
- 2016: Kanestrøm (Øra Fonogram)

=== Collaborations ===
With Dance with a Stranger

- 1987: Dance with a Stranger (Norsk Plateproduksjon)
- 1989: To/Fool's Paradise (Norsk Plateproduksjon/RCA)
- 1991: Atmosphere (Norsk Plateproduksjon)
- 1994: Look What You've Done! (Norsk Plateproduksjon)
- 1994: Unplugged Hits (Norsk Plateproduksjon), live
- 1995: The Best of Dance with a Stranger (Mercury)
- 1998: Happy Sounds (Mercury)
- 2007: Everyone Needs a Friend... The Very Best Of (Mercury)

With Masqualero

- 1988: Aero (ECM)

With Arild Andersen

- 1990: Sagn (ECM)

With Ketil Bjørnstad

- 1990: Odyssey (Kirkelig Kulturverksted)
- 1990: The Shadow (Kirkelig Kulturverksted)

With Morten Harket

- 1995: Wild Seed (Warner Bros.)
- 2007: Movies Single (Polydor)
- 2008: Letter From Egypt (Polydor)

With Ole Edvard Antonsen

- 1997: Read My Lips (EMI)

With Arild Andersen & Stian Carstensen

- 1998: Sommerbrisen (Kirkelig Kulturverksted)
- 2003: Julegløggen (Kirkelig Kulturverksted)
- 2006: Høstsløv (Kirkelig Kulturverksted)

With Jan Erik Vold

- 2005: Vold synger svadaåret inn (Hot Club)

With other projects

- 1983: Lone Attic (CBS), with Jens Wendelboe
- 1984: Keep Nose in Front (Hot Club), with AHA
- 1984: Silhouette (RCA Victor), with Silhouette
- 1986: Dansere I Natten, with Bjørn Eidsvåg
- 1986: Folk Er Rare!, with Maj Britt Andersen
- 1988: Interlude (Norwegian Composers), with Alfred Janson
- 1988: Constellations (Odin), with Bjørn Alterhaug
- 1988: Fullmåne), with Anne Grete Preus
- 1988: Vertigo, with Bjørn Eidsvåg
- 1989: Heartache Caravan, with Dee Dee Bridgewater
- 1991: Te Sola Rinn, with Lynni Treekrem
- 1991: Black Rock on Ice
- 1992: Nesten Ikke Tilstede, with Jan Eggum
- 1992: Æ, Rosalita
- 1994: Beat (Norsk Plateproduksjon), with Tall Trees
- 1995: Spor Av Ungdom (Valley)
- 1995: Strong Love Affair (Qwest), with Ray Charles
- 1997: Thirteen Rounds (Curling Legs), with Jon Eberson Jazzpunkensemble
- 1997: Towards the Sea (Brazz), with The Brazz Brothers
- 1997: Hermetic (Rune Grammofon), with Deathprod
- 1997: Towards the Sea (Brazz), with The Brazz Brothers
- 2000: 4G (Curling Legs), with 4G (Knut Værnes, Knut Reiersrud, Bjørn Klakegg)
- 2004: Veldig Respektable Menn (Tylden & Co), with De Musikalske Dvergene
- 2008: Breeze (Brazz), with Jan Magne Førde
- 2008: Donna Bacalao
- 2009: Make Her Believe Maxi-Single (PennyLane), with the XO Project
- 2010: Julefest I Vest, with "Vassendgutane" and friends
- 2011: Celebrating 30th anniversary (Brazz), with The Brazz Brothers

== Literature ==
- Frode Alnæs – mannen som er en gitar (2009) by Stig Nilsson, Schibsted Forlag.
