= Per Husby =

Norwegian jazz musician, teacher, and civil engineer

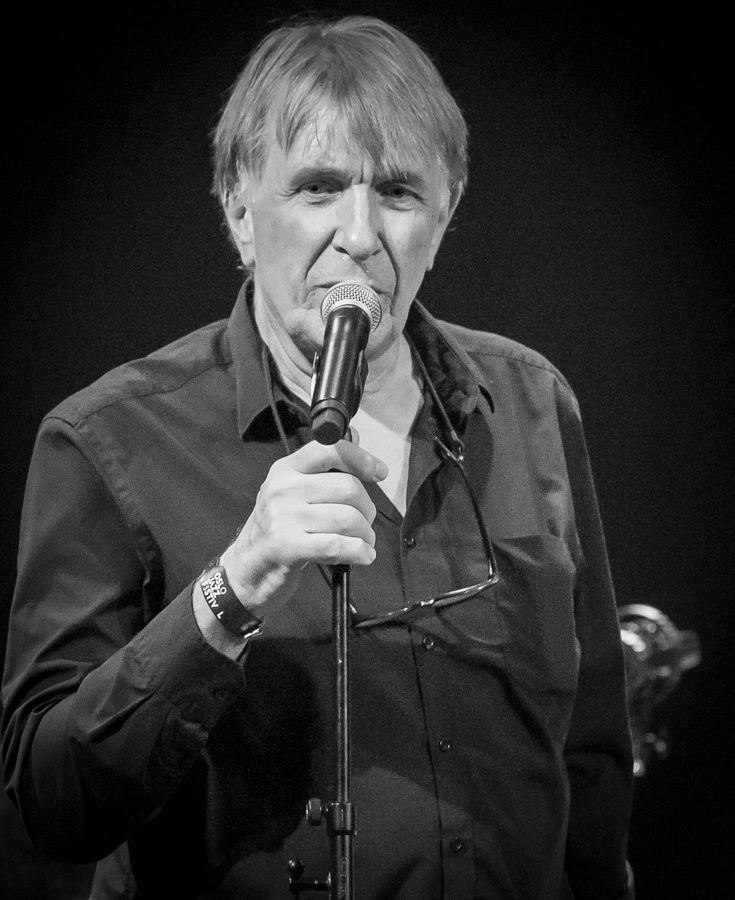
- Per Husby at Oslo jazzfestival (2016).

Background information
- Born: 2 April 1949 (age 76); Oslo, Norway
- Genres: Jazz
- Occupation(s): Musician, composer
- Instrument: Piano
- Website: www.poncajazzrec.no/husby

Per Husby (born 2 April 1949 in Oslo) is a Norwegian jazz pianist, composer, teacher, civil engineer, and orchestra leader.

== Career ==
Husby was raised in Oslo together with other jazz enthusiasts like jazz journalist Knut Borge.

He studied piano at the Music Conservatory of Oslo (1962–67), and became a siv.ing. in acoustics (under Asbjørn Krokstad) at the Norwegian Institute of Technology (1973), followed up with studies in jazz at Berklee in Boston. In Trondheim (1971–80), he worked with the local big band Bodega Band where he (and bassist Jan Tro) wrote much original music for recordings. Later, Husby performed in groups led by Asmund Bjørken and Bjørn Alterhaug. He was a musical director at the local theatre Trøndelag Teater (1975–80). Husby led his own septet, (1975–78), quintet (1980–83), and released records with his 13-piece Per Husby Dedication Orchestra (13 tracks).

From 1980 in Oslo, he was leader of the Federation of Norwegian Jazz musicians (1983–85), and co-edited the Norwegian Jazz Magazine Jazznytt (1981–84). Over 20 years, he made regular engagements as a pianist/orchestra leader on Norwegian TV Norwegian Broadcasting Corporation, including 11 years as a musical director for the "memory lane" TV series Da Capo.

Husby has produced and played with Hilde Louise Asbjørnsen, and plays in the Quartet of tenor saxophonist Bodil Niska as well as with singer Laila Dalseth. He has through the years worked as an accompanist for visiting jazz soloists such as Chet Baker (heard on The Improviser, Cadence Jazz Records), Clark Terry, Joe Henderson, Pepper Adams, Kenny Wheeler, James Moody and Karin Krog.

== Honors ==
- 1985: Molderosen at the Moldejazz
- 1985: Work of the year 1985, elected by the composer's organisation NOPA in for Poesi
- 1985: Spellemannprisen in the class Jazz, for the album Dedications
- 1989: Buddyprisen by The Norwegian jazz federation's honorary award

== Discography ==
- Per Husby Septet, Peacemaker (LP /CD 1976 Gemini Records, 2003). With Knut Riisnæs/Bjørn Johansen/Harald Bergersen saxophone Bernt Anker Steen trumpet, Carl Morten Iversen bass and Svein-Erik Gaardvik drums
- The Improviser (Cadence Jazz Records, 1983). With Chet Baker, Bjørn Kjellemyr, Espen Rud, Ole Jacob Hansen and Terje Venaas
- The Per Husby Dedication Orchestra, Dedications (Hot Club Records, 1985) won Spellemannprisen 1985,
- The Per Husby Dedication Orchestra, Your eyes (NOPA Records, 1987).
- Notes for nature (Odin Records, 1990) – including jazz adaptions of his music for the prize-winning TV documentary NRK-programme 2048 (1988)
- If you could see me now (Gemini Records, 1996). Recorded in New York City with Frank Wess, Grady Tate, Jim Pugh, Jay Leonhart, Bucky Pizzarelli, Chris Potter, Howard Johnson a.o.
- Anne Lande and Husby, Sakte sanger (Park Grammofon, 2006) with music by Alf Prøysen, Inger Hagerup, Antonio Carlos Jobim and others
- Anne Lande and Husby, Helt Nær (Park Grammofon, 2009).

== Works ==
- Poesi (1985)
- Two pieces for brass quintet (1987)
- Stråler mellom fjell (2000)
- Inverness wedding (2001)
- Mythos (2002)
- Vårsong/For ein dag (2002)
- Half a nice day (2002)

Awards
Preceded by Laila Dalseth	Recipient of the Jazz Spellemannprisen; 1985	Succeeded by Masqualero
Preceded by Carl Morten Iversen & Terje Venaas	Recipient of the Buddyprisen; 1989	Succeeded by John Pål Inderberg
