= Carl Morten Iversen =

Norwegian jazz upright bassist

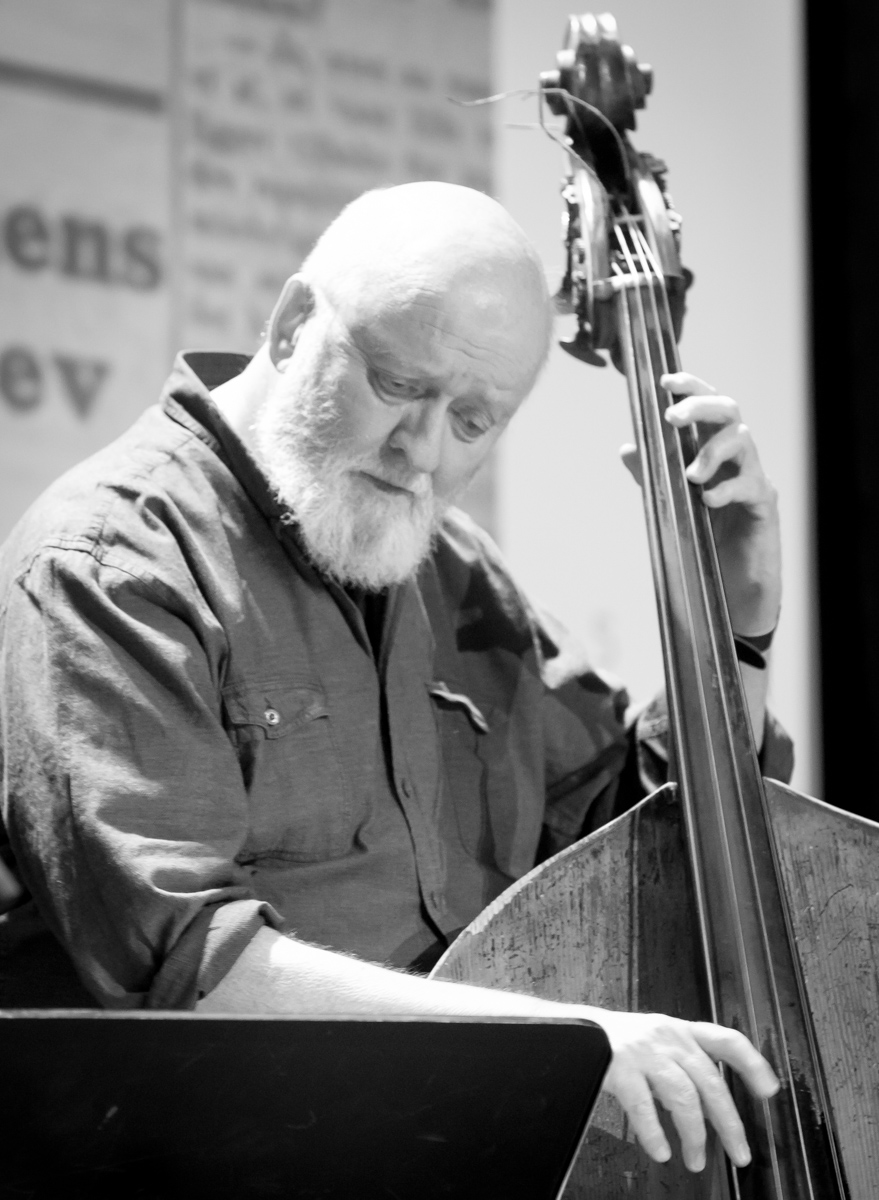
- Rudolf Nilsens songs and poetry, performed at the stage of Cosmopolite. The concert took place on 10. December 2016 in Oslo.

Background information
- Born: 1 May 1948; Oslo, Norway
- Died: 19 October 2023
- Genres: Jazz
- Occupations: Musician and composer
- Instrument: Upright bass

Carl Morten Iversen (1 May 1948 – 19 October 2023) was a Norwegian jazz musician (upright bass), and the son of jazz violinist Arild Iversen (1920–65). He was known from numerous recordings and had long been central to the Oslo Jazz scene.

== Career ==
Iversen – known as CMI among friends – was born in Oslo, and began playing as an accompanist for folk singers from 1965. Among others, he played with Lars Klevstrand at Moldejazz in 1968 and 1973, and attended an album with Lillebjørn Nilsen in 1974.

He got into jazz in 1970, and studied jazz in the United States until 1972. When returning, he played in a variety of bands from 1973, including with the Balke brothers, Jon Balke Quartet and Ditlef Eckhoff Quintet 1973–74, Magni Wentzel Quintet 1974–76 and 1979–84 with the album Sofies plass (1983), Guttorm Guttormsen Quartet 1974–80 with the albums Soturnudi (1975) and Albufeira (1979). With guitarist Jon Eberson he has released duoalbums Jazz for men (2001), Standards (2003) and the live recording Levende på Fyret (2006). He attended the album Live (2009) with Magni Wentzel Sekstett.

Iversen was president of Norsk Jazzforbund 1972–75, twice the president of Foreningen Norske Jazzmusikere (later merged into Norsk Jazzforum) 1979–1981 og 1989–1993, and also the editor in charge of the Jazznytt magazine. For several years, he was the president of the Norwegian branch of PEN International. He also served as the president of Norges Kunstnerråd (the Norwegian Artists' Council).

After his death, his instrument is being lent to aspiring young talents for periods of 5–7 years. This is administered by Norsk Jazzforum. The first musician to have this honour is Johannes Elnan (2025–).

== Honors ==
- Buddyprisen 1988
- Spellemannsprisen 1988 in the class Jazz for the album Off Balance, within Oslo 13

== Discography (in selection) ==
=== Within Guttorm Guttormsen Quartet ===
- 1975: Soturnudi
- 1979: Albufeira

=== Within Per Husby Septet ===
- 1976: Peacemaker

=== Within Oslo 13 ===
- 1981: Anti therapy (Odin Records)
- 1988: Off balance (Odin Records)
- 1992: Nonsentration (ECM Records), Awarded Spellemannprisen 1992 in the class Jazz
- 1992: Live (Curling Legs)

=== Trio with Armen Donelian & Audun Kleive ===
- 1988: Trio 87 (Odin Records)

=== Trio with Frank Jakobsen & Rob Waring ===
- 1991: Secret Red Thread (Odin Records)
- 2001: Synchronize your watches (Curling Legs)

=== Trio with Olga Konkova & Audun Kleive ===
- 1997: Going with the Flow (Curling Legs)

=== Duo with Jon Eberson ===
- 2001: Jazz For Men (Curling Legs)
- 2003: Standards (Curling Legs)
- 2006: Levende På Fyret (Curling Legs)

=== Within Jon Eberson Trio ===
- 2009: Born to be slow (NorCD), with Rob Waring

=== With Magni Wentzel ===
- 1983: Sofies plass (Hot Club Records), within M.W. Quartet
- 2009: Live (Curling Legs)

Awards
Preceded by Bjørn Johansen	Recipient of the Jazz Spellemannprisen; 1988	Succeeded by Egil Kapstad
Preceded by Tore Jensen	Recipient of the Buddyprisen; 1988	Succeeded by Per Husby
