= Morten Halle =

Norwegian jazz saxophonist, composer and arranger (born 1957)

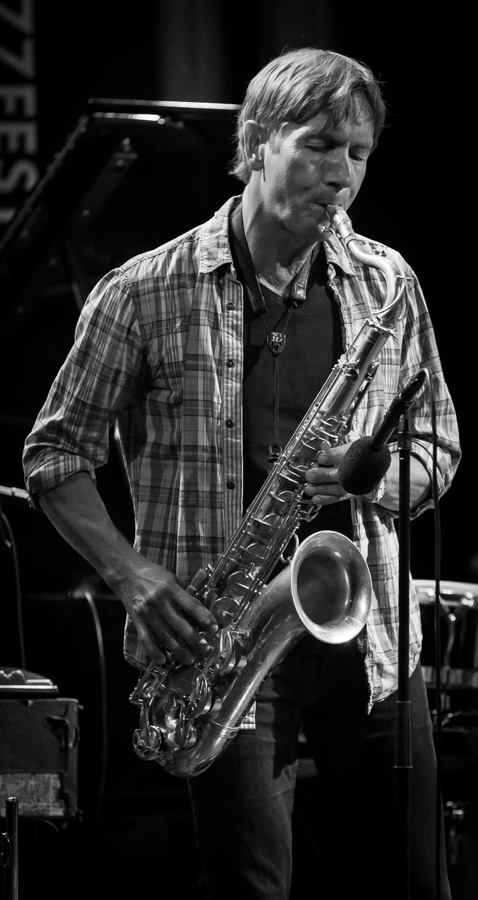
- Halle at Oslo Jazzfestival in 2016

Background information
- Born: 7 October 1957 (age 68); Oslo, Norway
- Origin: Norway
- Genres: Jazz
- Occupations: Musician, band leader, composer
- Instrument: Saxophones
- Website: nmh.no/en/contact/staff--faculty-directory/morten_halle-1

Morten Halle (born 7 October 1957) is a Norwegian jazz musician (saxophone), composer and music arranger. He was born in Oslo, and he is known from the city's jazz scene and from a series recordings.

== Career ==
Halle participated in various small bands at the Oslo Jazz scene in the late 1970s, when he studied music at the University of Oslo 1981–86, he was with the band Cutting Edge, and from 1987 in a quartet with John Eberson (guitar), Bjørn Kjellemyr (bass), and Finn Sletten/Pål Thowsen (drums). He has also played with the big band Oslo 13, with Knut Værnes Band, Jon Balke, Søyr, Chipahua and Geir Holmsen Band. He has been in the lineups of Jazzpunkensemblet, Desafinado, Horns for Hire with Torbjørn Sunde and Jens Petter Antonsen, Jon Balke's Magnetic North Orchestra, Geir Lysne Listening Ensemble, Søyr and Metropolitan (band). He has also appeared on releases by Helge Iberg (1997), Jan Magne Førde (1998), Jan Eggum (1999), Marianne Antonsen (2000) og Jørun Bøgeberg (2006).

Halle has written music for film, theater and ballet, as well as commissioned work only short stay Dølajazz Festival 1992, and composed music to the lyrics of Jesper Halle, performed by Jonas Fjeld and Sidsel Endresen (1988). He is a prominent figure in modern Norwegian jazz. His album releases include Alle tre (1995, compilation album Cutting Edge), 2 (1991) and The Eagle' (1995), with Halle/Eberson Quartett.

Lately he leads his own trio with Anders Jormin and Svante Henryson, and the Morten Halle Qvartet with Edvard Askeland, Torstein Lofthus and André Peterson/Vigleik Storaas.

Halle is a partner in the label "Curling Legs" (1992–), is attached as associate professor at Norges Musikkhøgskole in Oslo, and former Chairman of TONO.

== Discography (selection) ==
=== Solo projects ===
With Cutting Edge

- Cutting Edge (Odin Records, 1982)
- Our Man In Paradise (Odin Records, 1984)
- Duesenberg (Curling Legs, 1986)
- Alle tre (Curling Legs, 1995), compilation

With Halle/Eberson Quartet

- Blow! (Odin Records, 1989)
- 2 (Curling Legs, 1992)
- The Eagle (Curling Legs, 1995)

With Anders Jormin and Svante Henryson

- Ten Easy Pieces (Curling Legs, 2005)

With "Halles komet"

- Halles komet (Curling Legs, 2007)

=== Collaborations ===
With Marit Mathiesen

- Med parfyme (1981)
- Gale hjerte (1984)

With Sverre Kjelsberg

- Sverre (1982)

With Ketil Stokkan

- Ekte mannfolk (1985)
- Romeo (1986)

With Øystein Sunde

- Overbuljongpakkemesterassistent/Kaptein Snutebil (1986)
- Kjekt å ha (1989)
- Øystein Sundes 40 beste (1990)
- Du må'kke komme her og komme her (1994)
- Sundes verden – 52 av de aller beste (2006)

With Oslo 13 (Jon Balke)

- Nonsentration (1992)
- Oslo 13 Live (1993)
- Live In the North (2001)

With Ole Edvard Antonsen

- Tour De Force (1992)
- Read My Lips (1997)

With Jon Balke and Magnetic North Orchestra

- Further (1994)
- Solarized (1999)
- Kyanos (2002)

With Jan Eggum

- Deilig (1999)
- Ekte Eggum (2001)
- 30/30 (2005)

With others

- Larsen (1982), with Kjell Larsen
- Ung Pike Forsvunnet (1982), with Ung Pike Forsvunnet
- The Soul Survivors (1984), with Chipahua
- You and I/It's a Game (1984), with Ruth
- En herre med bart (1985), with Eldar Vågan
- To feite striper Brylkrem (1987), with The Teddybears
- Etterlatte sanger (1988), with Jonas Fjeld
- Fisking i Valdres (1988), with Viggo Sandvik
- Kvinner & Kanari (1989), with André Danielsen
- Wake Me When the Moon Comes Up (1989), with Duck Spin
- Tempo (1989), with Vazelina Bilopphøggers
- Last Train Home (1990), with Reidar Larsen
- Tatt av vinden (1990), with Bjørn Eidsvåg
- December (1990), with Dag Kolsrud
- Images of Light (1990), with Erik Wøllo
- Tamme erter og villbringebær (1990), with Maj Britt Andersen
- Ta meg til havet (1992), with Hanne Krogh
- Autumn 92 (1992), with Petter Samuelsen
- Roneo (1993), with Knut Værnes Band
- Shaken - Not Stirred (1993), with Palisander Kvartetten
- Med lyset på (1994), with Norsk Utflukt
- Du følger vinden (1994), with Diamond Simone
- Song om ei segn (1994), with LoMsk
- Bussene lengter hjem (1994), with Søyr
- Deceivers & Believers (1994), with Tim Scott McConnell
- Rippel Rappel (1994), with Maj Britt Andersen
- Exile (1994), with Sidsel Endresen
- The Water Is Wide (1994), with Eriksen
- Nightsong (1995), with Sidsel Endresen and Bugge Wesseltoft
- Har du lyttet til elvene om natta? (1995), with Sinikka Langeland
- Tverr Geitt tolker Geirr Tveitt live (1995), with Tverr Geitt
- Voices (1996), with Kvitretten
- Life Is Good (1996), with Steinar Albrigtsen
- Thirteen Rounds (1997), with Jon Ebersons Jazzpunkensemble
- Never Ending "West Side" Story (1997), with Helge Iberg
- Med kjøtt og kjærlighet (1997), with Eidbjørg Raknes
- 16 utvalgte sanger (1997), with Arne Aano
- Noahs draum (1998), with Kjell Habbestad
- Salmist (1998), with Per Søetorp
- Rotor (1998), with Jon Balke/Cikada Strykekvartett
- Imagic (1998), with Niels Præstholm
- Domen (1998), with Jan Magne Førde
- Meridians (1998), with Torbjørn Sunde
- Flua på veggen (1998), with Vamp
- Metropolitan (1999), with Metropolitan
- Solarized (1999), with Jon Balke
- Soulful Christmas Songs (2000), with Marianne Antonsen
- The 00 Quartet (2001), with The 00 Quartet
- Sirkus Mikkelikski (2001), with Alf Prøysen
- Alene hjemme (2001), with Søyr
- Indigo (2001), with New Jordal Swingers
- Aurora Borealis - Northern Lights (2002), with Geir Lysne
- Belfast Cowboy (2002), with New Jordal Swingers
- Kelner! (2002), with Odd Børretzen/Lars Martin Myhre
- Songs After You (2003), with Runar Andersen/Janne Kjellsen
- A Night in Cassis (2004), with Knut Værnes and Vertavokvartetten
- Silver (2004), with Solveig Slettahjell and Slow Motion Quintet
- Go Get Some (2004), with Tys Tys
- Tida som går (2004), with Norsk Utflukt
- Love Is Blind (2004), with Metropolitan
- Pixiedust (2005), with Solveig Slettahjell and Slow Motion Orchestra
- Boahjenásti - The North Star (2006), with Geir Lysne Listening Ensemble
- Basstard (2006), with Jørun Bøgeberg
- Byggmester Solness (2006), to the play by Henrik Ibsen
- Femkant (2007), with Pust
- Casta la vista! - Nissa og Elisabeths favorittsanger (2008), with Nissa Nyberget and Elisabeth Lindland
- The Grieg Code (2009), with Geir Lysne Ensemble
- Gjenfortellinger (2009), with Pitsj
- Take a Look at Your Life (2010), with Petter Samuelsen
- Big Shit (2010), with T8
