= Curling Legs =

Norwegian record label

- Founded: 1992
- Founder: Knut Værnes; Morten Halle
- Genre: Jazz
- Country of origin: Norway
- Location: Oslo
- Official website: www.curlinglegs.no

Curling Legs Productions A/S (established 1992 in Oslo, Norway) is a Norwegian record label with a catalogue encompassing all styles of jazz and improvised music. It was started by Knut Værnes and Morten Halle to release their own music. In 1994, Odin Records was licensed to Curling Legs from the Norwegian Jazz Forum, to continue the production of Norwegian jazz. In addition to Værnes and Halle, the third co-owner of Curling Legs is Helge Westbye, the director of the record label Grappa Music, and the label is part of FONO. The music is distributed through the company Musikkoperatørene.

By the time of their fiftieth issue, on 3 May 1999, Curling Legs had won Spellemannprisen four times.

The Radka Toneff Memorial Award is funded by the royalty income from all her releases on Odin, Universal and Curling Legs.

== Recordings published by Curling Legs ==
- 1989: Ab und Zu, Ab und Zu (ZUCD8901)
- 1992: Knut Værnes & Terje Gewelt, Admission for guitars and basses (CLPCD01)
- 1992: NUKU (Bjørn Klakegg, Johannes Eick, Trond Kopperud & Celio de Carvalho), Det absolutte nullpunkt (CLPCD02)
- 1992: Morten Halle, Jon Eberson, Finn Sletten & Bjørn Kjellemyr, 2 (CLPCD03)
- 1992: Audun Kleive & Jon Eberson, Music for Men and Machines (CLPCD04)
- 1992: Tore Brunborg, Bugge Wesseltoft & Jon Christensen, Tid (CLPCD05)
- 1992: Palisanderkvartetten (Are Hofstad, Roar Sandnes, Geir Lysne & Bernhard Seland), Shaken – not stirred (CLPCD06)
- 1993: Oslo 13, Live (CLPCD07)
- 1993: Knut Værnes Band, Roneo (CLPCD08)
- 1994: Søyr, Bussene lengter hjem (CLPCD09)
- 1994: The Source, Olemanns kornett (CLPCD10)
- 1994: Nils-Olav Johansen, Sverre Gjørvad & Svein Folkvord, Enjoy storytellers! (CLPCD11)
- 1994: Per Eriksen, Center of the beat (CLPCD12)
- 1994: Lars Danielsson, David Liebman, Jon Christensen, Bobo Stenson, Far north (CLPCD13)
- 1994: Sidsel Endresen & Bugge Wesseltoft, Nightsong (CLPCD14)
- 1995: Out to Lunch, Kullboksrytter (CLPCD15)
- 1995: Jan Gunnar Hoff, Moving (CLPCD16)
- 1995: Morten Halle m.fl. Eagle (CLPCD17)
- 1995: Vigleik Storaas Trio, Bilder (CLPCD18) - winner of 1995 Spellemannprisen
- 1995: Cutting Edge, Alle tre (CLPCD19)
- 1995: Knut Værnes Trio, Jacques Tati (CLPCD20)
- 1995: The Source, of Christmas (CLPCD21)
- 1996: Per Jørgensen, Audun Kleive & Jon Balke, Jøkleba live! (CLPCD22)
- 1996: Rune Klakeggs «Fuzzy Logic», Fuzzy logic (CLPCD23)
- 1996: Jakob Davidsen, Jesper Riis, Per Gade, Nils Davidsen & Anders Mogensen, The Crossover Ensemble (CLPCD24)
- 1996: Ab und Zu, Totally (CLPCD25)
- 1996: Kvitretten, Voices (CLPCD26)
- 1996: Gunnar Andreas Berg, The music machine (CLPCD27)
- 1996: Petter Wettre Quartet, Pig virus (CLPCD28)
- 1997: Espen Larsen & Per Sigmond, Synergia (CLPCD29)
- 1997: Vidar Johansen Trio, Lopsided (CLPCD30)
- 1997: Krøyt, Sub (CLPCD31)
- 1997: Lars Danielsson Trio, Origo (CLPCD32)
- 1997: Ab und Zu, Remix EP (CLPCD33)
- 1997: Per Eriksen, Beats and pieces (CLPCD34)
- 1997: Vigleik Storaas Trio, Andre Bilder (CLPCD35) - winner of 1997 Spellemannprisen
- 1997: Søyr, Med kjøtt and kjærlighet (CLPCD36)
- 1997: Jacob Young, Pieces of Time (CLPCD37)
- 1998: Jazzpunkensemblet, Fourteen rounds (CLPCD38)
- 1997: Olga Konkova, Carl Morten Iversen & Audun Kleive, Going with the flow (CLPCD39)
- 1998: Knut Værnes Trio, 8:97 (CLPCD40)
- 1998: Sidsel Endresen & Bugge Wesseltoft, Duplex ride (CLPCD41)
- 1998: Jon Balke, Rotor (CLPCD42)
- 1998: Patrick Shaw Iversen, Floating islands (CLPCD43)
- 1998: Jan Gunnar Hoff, Crosslands (CLPCD44)
- 1998: Niels Præstholm & Embla Nordic Project, Imagic (CLPCD45)
- 1998: Live Maria Roggen & Lars Andreas Haug, Tu'ba (CLPCD46)
- 1998: Tore Brunborg & Jarle Vespestad, Orbit (CLPCD47)
- 1999: Bjørn Klakegg, Gloria (CLPCD48)
- 1999: Vigleik Storaas Trio, Open Excursions (CLPCD49)
- 1999: Kvitretten, Everything turns (CLPCD50)
- 1999: Knut Værnes, Super Duper (CLPCD51)
- 2000: «4G» - Knut Værnes, Frode Alnæs, Knut Reiersrud & Bjørn Klakegg, 4G (CLPCD52)
- 2000: Helén Eriksen, City Dust (CLPCD53)
- 2000: Helge Iberg, Halvveis (CLPCD54)
- 2000: Georg Reiss & Morten Gunnar Larsen, Rhapsody (CLPCD55)
- 2000: Per Eriksen, Beat crazy (CLPCD56)
- 2001: Pangean, Pubterranean (CLPCD57)
- 2001: Søyr, Alene hjemme (CLPCD58)
- 2001: Jon Eberson's «The O O Quartet», The O O Quartet (CLPCD59)
- 2001: Jacob Young, Glow (CLPCD60)
- 2001: Come Shine, Come shine (CLPCD61)
- 2001: Helge Lien Trio, What are you doing the rest of your life (CLPCD62)
- 2001: 1300 Oslo, Live in the north (CLPCD63)
- 2001: Chillinuts (Peter Baden, Hans Jørgen Whist & Marius Rypdal), Reworks (CLPLP64)
- 2001: Jon Eberson & Carl Morten Iversen, Jazz for men (CLPCD65)
- 2001: Jon Eberson, Bjørnar Andresen & Paal Nilssen-Love, Mind The Gap (CLPCD66)
- 2001: Ingar Kristiansen & Torstein Ellingsen, The Sinatra songbook (CLPCD67)
- 2001: Sverre Gjørvad, Denne lille pytten er et hav (CLPCD68)
- 2001: Solveig Slettahjell, Slow motion orchestra (CLPCD69)
- 2001: Kvitretten & Torgeir Rebolledo Pedersen, Kloden er en snurrebass som snurrer oss (CLPCD70)
- 2002: Vigleik Storaas Trio, Subsonic (CLPCD71) - nominated for 2002 Spellemannprisen for jazz
- 2002: Roy Hellvin Trio, Old friends (CLPCD72)
- 2002: Pål Thowsen, The rest is rumours (CLPCD73)
- 2002: Ab und Zu, Spark of life (CLPCD74)
- 2002: Come Shine, Do Do That Voodoo (CLPCD75) - winner of 2002 Spellemannprisen for jazz
- 2003: Jon Eberson & Carl Morten Iversen, Standards (CLPCD76)
- 2003: Jan Gunnar Hoff Group, In town (CLPCD77)
- 2003: Come Shine & Kringkastingsorkesteret, In concert (CLPCD78)
- 2004: Frode Kjekstad, New York time (CLPCD79)
- 2004: Solveig Slettahjell, Silver (CLPCD80) - winner of 2004 Spellemannprisen for jazz
- 2004: Hilde Marie Kjersem, Red shoes diary (CLPCD81)
- 2004: Knut Værnes & Vertavo-kvartetten, A night in cassis (CLPCD82)
- 2004: Chillinuts, Reworks – what kind of machine is this (CLPCD83) - a remix of 80 Curling Legs recordings into 11 new tracks
- 2004: Beate S. Lech, Jon Eberson & Morten Halle (Metropolitan (band)), Blind (CLPCD84)
- 2004: Hilde Marie Kjersem & Jon Eberson, Twelve o'clock tales (CLPCD85)
- 2005: Ivar Kolve Trio, Innover (CLPCD86)
- 2005: Håkon Storm, Canned second (CLPCD87)
- 2005: Helge Liens «tri ó trang», Plays Eberson (CLPCD88)
- 2005: BOL Silver sun (CLPCD89)
- 2005: Solveig Slettahjell, Pixiedust (CLPCD90)
- 2005: Lars Andreas Haug, Vinterfjøs (CLPCD91)
- 2005: Hans Mathisen, Quiet Songs (CLPCD92)
- 2005: Bjørn Klakegg, A day with no plans at all (CLPCD93)
- 2005: Morten Halle, Ten easy pieces (CLPCD94)
- 2005: Helge Lien Trio, Live (CLPCD95)
- 2006: Heidi Skjerve Quintet, Coming Home (CLPCD96)
- 2006: Tobias Sjögren & Per Jørgensen, Unspoken songs (CLPCD97)
- 2006: Tri ó trang (Lars Andreas Haug/Helge Lien/Torben Snekkestad), MÅ (CLPCD 97(1))
- 2006: Solveig Slettahjell, Good rain (CLPCD 98)
- 2007: Jørn Skogheim, Above water (CLPCD 99)
- 2012: Elin Synnøve Bråthen, Time to cross (CLPCD 100)
- 2007: Tellef Øgrim, Wagon 8 (CLPCD 101)
- 2007: Per Eriksen, Beat repeat (CLPCD 102)
- 2007: Morten Halle, Halles komet (CLPCD 103)
- 2007: Solveig Slettahjell, Domestic Songs (CLPCD 104)
- 2008: Ivar Kolve Trio, View from my room (CLPCD 105)
- 2008: Jan Wiese, Erik Wøllo & Rob Waring, Wiese Wøllo Waring (CLPCD 106)
- 2008: Lars Andreas Haug Quintet, Fabatune (CLPCD 107)
- 2008: Radka Toneff, Butterfly (CLPCD 108)
- 2008: Heidi Skjerve, Morning news of the woods (CLPCD 109)
- 2008: Grethe Kausland, Jazz my way (CLPCD 110)
- 2009: Kåre Kolve Quartet, My direction (CLPCD 111)
- 2010: Steve Dobrogosz, Golden slumbers (CLPCD 112)
- 2010: Magni Wentzel, Live (CLPCD 113)
- 2010: Elin Synnøve Bråthen, The anchor and the dream (CLPCD 114)
- 2010: Kåre Kolve Quartet, Further directions (CLPCD 115)
- 2010: Steve Dobrogosz, Your songs (CLPCD 116)
- 2011: Jørn Skogheim, New direction (CLPCD 117)
- 2011: Hans Mathisen, Timeless tales (CLPCD 118)
- 2011: Torbjørn Sletta Jacobsen, Time layers (CLPCD 119)
- 2011: Urban Tunélls Klezmerband, In der finster (CLPCD 120)
- 2011: Espen Rud, Dobbeldans (CLPCD 121)
- 2011: Eyolf Dale, Hotel interludes (CLPCD 122)
- 2012: Rune Klakegg Trio, Romantic notions (CLPCD 123)
- 2012: Fire fyrer (Torbjørn Sunde, Frode Kjekstad, Espen Rud & Sigurd Hole), Prøysen goes jazz (CLPCD 124)
- 2012: Frode Kjekstad, The Italian Job (CLPCD 125)
- 2012: Morten Halle, Northern arc (CLPCD 126)
- 2012: Espen Rud, Løvsamleren (CLPCD 127)
- 2012: Ung Pike Forsvunnet, Kraften i oss to (single) (CLPCD 128)
- 2013: Lars Andreas Haug, Conrairo (CLPCD 129)
- 2013: Soo Cho, Pandora ( CLP CD 130)
- 2013: Ung Pike Forsvunnet, Skatten i Skrinet (single) (CLP CD 131)
- 2013: Arne Olav Hageberg, Firogtjue Kalde (single) (CLP CD 132)
- 2013: Arne Olav Hageberg, Råoljekjærleik (CLP CD 133)
- 2013: Kenny Wessel, Weights & Measures (CLP CD 134)
- 2013: Knut Værnes Group, Tributes (CLP CD 135)
- 2014: Espen Rud, Ukjend By (CLP CD 136)
- 2013: Eyolf Dale, Hometown Interludes (CLP CD 137)
- 2013: Live Foyn Friis, Running Heart (CLP CD 138)
- 2014: Live Foyn Friis, With Strings (CLP CD 139)
- 2014: Hans Mathisen, The Island (CLP CD 144)
- 2015: Lush Life, Ordinary Things That Everyone Ought To Do (CLP CD 148)
- 2015: Rune Klakegg and Jan Olav Renvåg, Jazz På Norsk (CLP CD 149)
- 2016: Halles Komet, The Storm Inside (CLP CD 154)
- 2016: Lukas Zabulionis, Changing Tides (CLP CD 155)
- 2017: Svein Olav Herstad Trio, The Ballad Book (CLP LP 156)
