= Magnetic North Orchestra =

Norwegian jazz orchestra

- Origin: Oslo, Norway
- Genres: Jazz and contemporary music
- Years active: 1992–2005
- Labels: ECM Records
- Members: Jon Balke; Per Jørgensen; Arve Henriksen; Jens Petter Antonsen; Morten Halle; Tore Brunborg; Fredrik Lundin; Bjarte Eike; Peter Spissky; Gertrud Økland; Henrik Hannisdal; Odd Hannisdal; Trond Villa; Marek Konstantynowicz; Jonas Franke-Blom; Svante Henryson; Morten Hannisdal; Thomas Pitt; Anders Jormin; Ingar Zach; Helge Norbakken
- Website: Magnetic Music Official Website

Magnetic North Orchestra established in Oslo, Norway (1992–2005) was a Norwegian jazz orchestra, created and led by Jon Balke. MNO was originally a jazz ensemble inspired by Oslo 13, put together with strings and percussion. As Olympic musical ambassador from 1993 to 1994, for the 1994 Winter Olympics at Lillehammer, Jon Balke created the work Magnetic North for a larger group, and under this name (MNO) he has toured in Europe, USA and Japan.

MNO was further developed with fourteen string musicians from "Stavanger Symfoniorkester" for the production Grand Magnetic (2001), and in a version with the "TrondheimSolistene". After 2002 they had close cooperation with Balke's band Batagraf. The lineup has varied from seven to thirteen.

== Members ==
- Jon Balke (piano, keyboards, percussion, electronics)
- Jens Petter Antonsen (trumpet)
- Per Jørgensen (trumpet, vocals)
- Arve Henriksen (trumpet, vocals)
- Fredrik Lundin (bass flute, soprano saxophone, tenor saxophone)
- Morten Halle (alto saxophone, flute)
- Tore Brunborg (tenor and soprano saxophones)
- Gertrud Økland (violin)
- Henrik Hannisdal (violin)
- Odd Hannisdal (violin)
- Bjarte Eike (violin)
- Peter Spissky (violin)
- Trond Villa (viola)
- Marek Konstantynowicz (viola)
- Jonas Franke-Blom (violoncello)
- Svante Henryson (violoncello)
- Morten Hannisdal (violoncello)
- Thomas Pitt (bass violin)
- Anders Jormin (double bass)
- Marilyn Mazur (percussion)
- Ingar Zach (percussion)
- Helge Norbakken (percussion)
- Audun Kleive (drums)

== Commissioned Works ==
- Il cenone (Vossajazz, 1992)
- Magnetic North (OL Lillehammer, 1994)
- Grand Magnetic (Copenhagen, 2001), augmented Magnetic North with a 14-piece string group
- ECM Autumn Cycle (Dublin, 2005)

== Discography ==
- Further (ECM Records, 1992)
- Solarized (Emarcy, 1999)
- Kyanos (ECM, 2002)
- Diverted travels (ECM, 2004)
- Magnetic Works 1993-2001 (ECM, 2012), compilation

== On Video ==
- Live in Bruxelles (Prospect Media, 2005), Video documentary
- Magnetisk musiker (NRK, 2004), video portrait made by Audun Aagre
