= Bjørn Johansen (musician) =

Norwegian jazz musician (1940–2002)

- Born: Bjørn John Johansen; 23 May 1940; Fredrikstad, Østfold
- Origin: Norway
- Died: 6 May 2002 (aged 61) Fredrikstad, Østfold
- Occupations: Saxophonist and composer
- Instruments: Saxophones (baritone, tenor, alto), clarinet and flute
- Label: Poncajazz

Bjørn John Johansen (23 May 1940 – 6 May 2002) was a Norwegian jazz musician (baritone, tenor & alto saxophones, clarinet and flute), known from a number of recordings and international cooperation. He has been one of the most influential Norwegian saxophonists of all time and has been the inspiration for a generations of musicians, among them Jan Garbarek.

== Career ==
Johansen was born in Fredrikstad, Norway. Strongly influenced by the music of John Coltrane, he joined orchestras led by Gunnar Brostigen, Kjell Karlsen (1956–59), Lars Sandsgaard, Pete Brown, and Arild Wikstrøm (1961). In addition to playing with Karin Krog, Bernt Rosengren, George Gruntz, Frode Thingnæs, Egil Kapstad, Helge Hurum/Thorleif Østereng/«Radiostorbandet» (1966–90), EBU Big Band (73), Laila Dalseth, Bjørn Alterhaug, and within the «Fatah Morgana Quartet».

He was central in the Norwegian jazz scene within bands like his own Kapstad/Johansen Quartet, including Bjørn Alterhaug (bass) and Ole Jacob Hansen (drums), releasing the album Friends (1980), and Bjørn Johansen Quartet, including Carl Morten Iversen (bass), Ole Jacob Hansen (drums) and Erling Aksdal (piano), releasing Dear Henrik (1984). Johansen also released the album Take one featuring Cedar Walton (1987), that was awarded Spellemannprisen 1987. His compositions are published by Norsk Jazzforlag (2004).

He died, aged 61, in Oslo.

== Honors ==
- Buddyprisen 1962
- «Statens arbeidsstipend» 1981
- Spellemannprisen 1987 in the class Jazz, for the album Take one
- Gammleng-prisen 1997 in the class Jazz

== Discography ==
=== Soloalbums ===
- 1986: Dear Henrik (Gemini Music)
- 1987: Take One (Odin Records), feat. Cedar Walton Trio
- 1990: Some Other Time (), with Laila Dalseth, Bjørn Alterhaug, Egil Kapstad & Frode Thingnæs
- 2001: Portrait of a Norwegian Jazz Artist (Gemini Records)

=== Collaborative works ===
Within «Public Enemies»

- 1965: Elevate Me
- 1966: From Public Enemies Without Love
- 1966: Sunny (), feat. Karin Krog

With Egil Kapstad

- 1968: Syner (Norsk Jazzforum), with Choir & Orchestra
- 1979: Til jorden (Pan Records 2005), feat. the poet Rolf Jacobsen
- 1980: Friends (Hot Club Records), within Kapstad/Johansen Quartet
- 1994: Remembrance, within Egil Kapstad Trio

Within «Blix Band»

- 1997: På en lyserød sky
- 1999: Texas

With other projects

- 1963: Metropol Jazz: Jazz Sounds From Norway
- 1967: Rosemalt Sound, with Alf Cranner
- 1974: Syng, klapp & swing - Grammofonplate med barn og Harald Gundhus (Dyklestiker Grannofon 2005)
- 1976: Peacemaker (Gemini Records 2003), with Per Husby Septett
- 1980: Hva er det de vil? Live fra ABC-Teateret, with Odd Børretzen & Alf Cranner
- 1980: Jargong vålereng', with Rolf Søder
- 1983: Norsk Jazz 1960-1980
- 1984: Epilog
- 1986: The Norwegian Radio Big Band meets Bob Florence (Odin Records), with Bob Florence
- 1988: The Jazz Sampler
- 1988: Alfred Janson
- 1989: The Odin Sampler - Jazz out of Norway
- 1990: Jazzpoem, Vol. 1, with Ola Calmeyer
- 1991: The Jazz Sampler Vol. 2
- 1991: Constellations (Odin Records), with Bjørn Alterhaug
- 1993: Norske bilder - Sounds and Visions of Norway
- 1993: Med lyset på, within «Norsk Utflukt»
- 1996: Close Erase, within «Close Erase»
- 1996:: Mr. Swingstang, within «Mr. Swingstang»
- 1996: I livd av blå syrin, within «Busserullen»
- 1997: Rett opp fra elva, within «Sagene Ring»
- 1997: Andre bilder Vigleik Storaas Trio
- 1998: Odd Børretzens mest ålreite (Bare Bra Musikk)
- 1998: Imagic, with Niels Præstholm & «Embla Nordic Project»
- 1999: Oslo Jazz Circle 50 år - Jubileumskonsert 1998 - Vol. 2
- 2000:: One of a Kind, with Laila Dalseth
- 2001: Cool, Kløver & Dixie - Jazz in Norway Vol. 3
- 2003: Bjørn Johansen in Memoriam (Hot Club Records)
- 2003: Turning Pages - Jazz in Norway vol. 4
- 2003: 50 beste fra 40 år, with Alf Cranner
- 2005: Jazz Collection 1
- 2007: Spectre: The Unreleased Works 1971-1982 (Plastic Strip), with Helge Hurum
- 2008: Unreleased Works 1969-1979 (Plastic Strip), with Christian Reim
- 2010: Our Buddy, with Ola Calmeyer

Awards
| Preceded by Erik Amundsen | Recipient of the Jazz Buddyprisen; 1962 | Succeeded by Øistein Ringstad |
| Preceded by Masqualero | Recipient of the Jazz Spellemannprisen; 1987 | Succeeded by Oslo 13 |
| Preceded by Ole Jacob Hansen | Recipient of the Jazz Gammleng-prisen; 1997 | Succeeded by Nils Petter Molvær |
