= Siri Gellein =

Norwegian vocalist and journalist (born 1966)

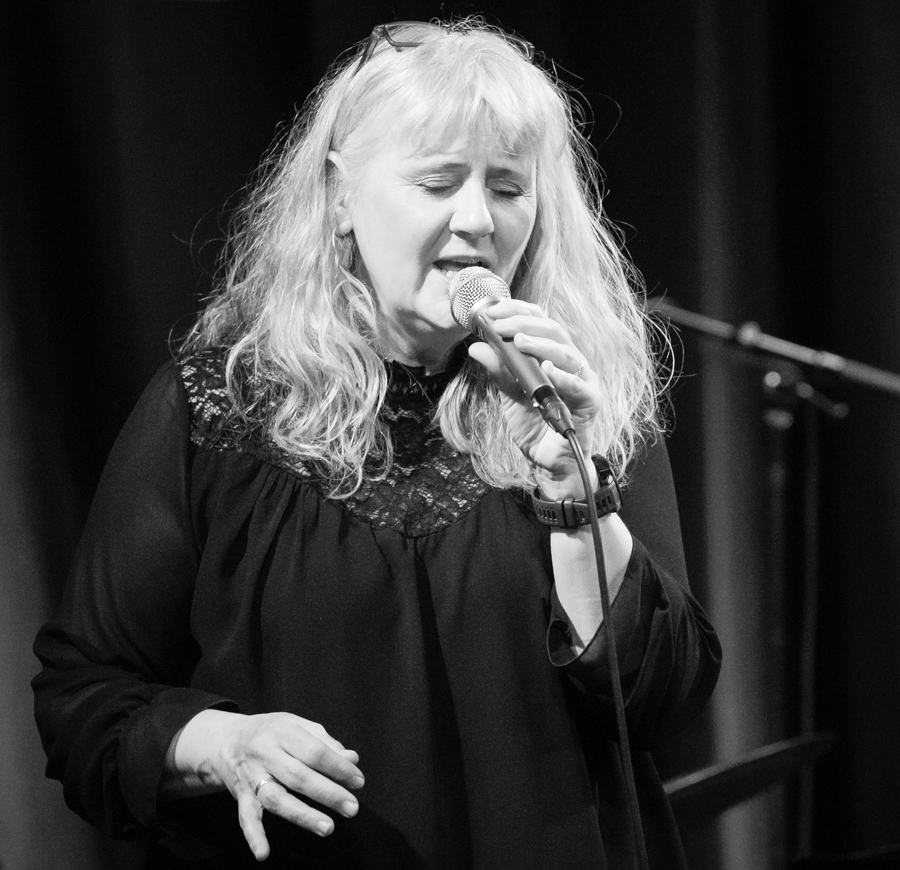
- Siri Gellein performing in 2020

Background information
- Born: Siri Beathe Gellein; 1 October 1966 (age 59); Trondheim, Norway
- Origin: Norway
- Genres: Jazz
- Occupations: Musician, composer
- Instrument: Vocals

Siri Beathe Gellein (born 1 October 1966 in Trondheim, Norway) is a Norwegian musician (vocals) and journalist, known from several albums, bands and television programs.

== Career ==
Her own Siri's Svale Band (established in 1987) performs ("sval") cool jazz, with soul. Other band members are John Pål Inderberg (saxophone), Odd Magne Gridseth (bass guitar), Carl Haakon Waadeland (drums), and Bjørn Alterhaug (double bass). The Quintet released the album Blackbird (1990) and Necessarily So ... (2001) at label Sonor Records. Both gained international fame, particularly due to sonic quality recordings.

On the album Baby Blue – Absolutely live record at Moldejazz (1991) she plays with the guitarist Geir Tosaunet, and had another album release Sånn vil du ha meg (1999), with Bjørn Willadsen Band more into folk music, and lyrics by Inger Hagerup.

Gellein contributed on DumDum Boys album Splitter pine, 1989, participated in the Norwegian Grand Prix semi-finals Melodi Grand Prix 1988 with the tune "Nå" (music composed by Nissa Nyberget, and lyrics by Idar Lind). In the 1990s, she was known as the leader of the program "Sommeråpent" at NRK. I 2002 var hun gjest i "Rundt et Flygel". She has also served on the board of "Trondheim Jazz Festival". In 1993 she started as a reporter in NRK (TV / radio) continuing in Adresseavisen as writing journalist, radio and television reporter in May 2004. She joined the newly established Arbeideravisa December 2007, but left there on 1 June 2008 to work as a freelance journalist and musician.

== Discography ==
- 1989: Splitter Pine (CBS), with DumDum Boys
- 1990: Blackbird (Sonor Records)
- 1993: Absolutely Live (NAB Records), Trio with Baby Blue (Jostein Strand and Trond Hustad)
- 1997: Necessarily So... (Sonor Records)
- 1999: Sånn vil du ha meg (BWM), with Bjørn Villadsen Band (Tore Johansen)
- 2007: Best of Siri's Svale Band (Mesa Music)
