= Gammleng Award =

Norwegian culture award

The Gammleng Award (Norwegian: Gammleng-prisen) is a Norwegian culture award created by The Fund for Performing Artists in 1982, 25 years after the fund was established in 1957. The award's official name is the Rolf Gammleng award to performing artists (Norwegian: Rolf Gammlengs pris til utøvende kunstnere). It's awarded to artists who have in a meritorious way contributed on recordings, stage performances, or concerts.

The award is named after Rolf Gammleng, who was leading the Norwegian Musicians' Union when the fund was created. It's awarded each year to around 10 artists in various classes, with an award amount of 75 000 kr for the veteran's price and 50 000 kr to all others.

== Award winners ==
=== 1982 ===
- Jens Book-Jenssen (veteran)
- Jan Garbarek (jazz)
- Eva Knardal (classic)
- Pete Knutsen (studio musician)
- Fred Nøddelund (studio musician)
- Terje Venaas (studio musician)
- Lillebjørn Nilsen (singer)
- Kirsti Sparboe (pop music)

=== 1983 ===
- Nora Brockstedt (veteran)
- Åge Aleksandersen (pop music)
- Karin Krog (jazz)
- Øystein Sunde (singer)
- Arve Tellefsen (classic)
- Frode Thingnæs (studio musician)
- Henryk Lysiak (studio musician)
- Sveinung Hovensjø (studio musician)

=== 1984 ===
- Inger Jacobsen (veteran)
- Arild Andersen (jazz)
- Alf Cranner (singer)
- Brynjar Hoff (classic)
- Jahn Teigen (pop music)
- Kari Gjærum (studio musician)
- Freddy Lindquist (studio musician)
- Jon Christensen (studio musician)

=== 1985 ===
- Åse Wentzel (veteran)
- Trond Granlund (pop music)
- Birgitte Grimstad (singer)
- Egil Kapstad (jazz)
- Robert Levin (classic)
- Marius Müller (studio musician)
- Nils Petter Nyrén (studio musician)
- Svein Dag Hauge (studio musician)

=== 1986 ===
- Kurt Foss (veteran)
- Laila Dalseth (jazz)
- Jonas Fjeld (pop music)
- Finn Kalvik (singer)
- Robert Riefling (classic)
- Henning Sommerro (studio musician)
- Trygve Thue (studio musician)
- Rolf Graf (studio musician)

=== 1987 ===
- Ottar E. Akre (veteran)
- Kjell Bækkelund (classic)
- Lars Klevstrand (singer)
- The Monroes (pop music)
- Bjarne Nerem (jazz)
- Arne Monn-Iversen (studio musician)
- Bjørn Nessjø (studio musician)
- Per Nyhaug (studio musician)

=== 1988 ===
- Erik Bye (veteran)
- Dollie de Luxe (pop music)
- Bjarne Larsen (classic)
- Magni Wentzel (jazz)
- Geirr Lystrup (singer)
- Kai Angel Næsteby (studio musician)
- John Svendsen (studio musician)
- Kjetil Bjerkestrand (studio musician)

=== 1989 ===
- Rowland Greenberg (veteran)
- Bjørn Alterhaug (jazz)
- Jan Eggum (singer)
- Liv Glaser (classic)
- Vazelina Bilopphøggers (pop music)
- Elisabeth Sønstevold (studio musician)
- Kari Iveland (studio musician)
- Svein Christiansen (studio musician)

=== 1990 ===
- Egil Monn-Iversen (veteran)
- Kari Bremnes (singer)
- Jørn Hoel (pop music)
- Terje Rypdal (jazz)
- Froydis Ree Wekre (classic)
- Ragnar Robertsen (studio musician)
- Kari Stokke (studio musician)
- Eivind Aarset (studio musician)

=== 1991 ===
- Willy Andresen (veteran)
- Kirsten Bråten Berg (singer)
- Kristian Bergheim (jazz)
- Sidsel Endresen (open class)
- Anita Skorgan (pop music)
- Knut Skram (classic)
- Olav Dale (studio musician)
- Terje Methi (studio musician)
- Bent Wiedswang (studio musician)

=== 1992 ===
- Arne Bendiksen (veteran)
- Dance with a Stranger (pop music)
- Tove Karoline Knudsen (singer)
- Anne Grete Preus (open class)
- Knut Riisnæs (jazz)
- Per Vollestad (classic)
- Bjørn Jacobsen (studio musician)
- Knut Reiersrud (studio musician)
- Harald Skogrand (studio musician)

=== 1993 ===
- Carsten Andersen (veteran)
- Leif Ove Andsnes (classic)
- Mari Boine (open class)
- Bendik Hofseth (jazz)
- Hanne Krogh (pop music)
- Halvdan Sivertsen (singer)
- Edvard Askeland (studio musician)
- Karl Johan Helgesen (studio musician)
- Ida Lind (studio musician)

=== 1994 ===
- Vidar Sandbeck (veteran)
- Maj Britt Andersen (open class)
- Totti Bergh (jazz)
- Kari Svendsen (singer)
- Ole Kristian Ruud (classic)
- DeLillos (pop music)
- Noralf Glæin (studio musician)
- Kristin Skaare (studio musician)
- Geir Sundstøl (studio musician)

=== 1995 ===
- Kjell Karlsen (veteran)
- Ole Edvard Antonsen (classic)
- Ole Paus (singer)
- Kåre Virud (pop music)
- Egil Johansen (jazz)
- Lynni Treekrem (open class)
- Per Hillestad (studio musician)
- Elisabeth Moberg (studio musician)
- Oddvar Mordal (studio musician)

=== 1996 ===
- Torstein Grythe (veteran)
- Einar Steen-Nøkleberg (classic)
- Bjørn Eidsvåg (singer)
- Di Derre (pop music)
- Ole Jacob Hansen (jazz)
- Sigmund Groven (open class)
- Geir Holmsen (studio musician)
- Mariann Lisland (studio musician)
- Lasse Hafreager (studio musician)

=== 1997 ===
- Einar Iversen (veteran)
- Bjørn Johansen (jazz)
- Dum Dum Boys (pop music)
- Odd Børretzen (singer)
- Geir Henning Braaten (classic)
- Agnes Buen Garnås (open class)
- Rita Eriksen (studio musician)
- Paolo Vinaccia (studio musician)
- Jørun Bøgeberg (studio musician)

=== 1998 ===
- Harry Kvebæk (veteran)
- Nils Petter Molvær (jazz)
- Espen Lind (pop music)
- Vamp (singer)
- Truls Mørk (classic)
- Karl Seglem (open class)
- Iver Kleive (studio musician)
- Sonja Wold (studio musician)
- Rune Arnesen (studio musician)

=== 1999 ===
- Egil Storbekken (veteran)
- Bugge Wesseltoft (jazz)
- Motorpsycho (pop music/rock)
- Kine Hellebust (singer)
- Anne-Lise Berntsen (classic)
- Steinar Ofsdal (open class)
- Håkon Iversen (studio musician)
- Børge Petersen-Øverleir (studio musician)
- Odd Arvid Eilertsen (studio musician)

=== 2000 ===
- Aase Nordmo Løvberg (veteran)
- Kristin Asbjørnsen (jazz)
- Ronni Le Tekrø (pop music/rock)
- Vertavokvartetten (classic)
- Jørn Simen Øverli (singer)
- Susanne Lundeng (open class)
- Ole Amund Gjersvik (studio musician)
- Bitten Forsudd (studio musician)
- Tom Steinar Lund (studio musician)

=== 2001 ===
- Ivar Medaas (veteran)
- Knut Værnes (jazz)
- Solveig Kringlebotn (classic)
- Ketil Bjørnstad (open class)
- Midnight Choir (pop music)
- Louis Jacobi (singer)
- Roy Hellvin (studio musician)
- Jorun Erdal (studio musician)
- Karim Sayed (studio musician)

=== 2002 ===
- Finn Eriksen (veteran)
- Morten Abel (pop music)
- Håvard Gimse (classic)
- Vigleik Storaas (jazz)
- Terje Nilsen (singer)
- Hallvard T. Bjørgum (open class)
- Stein Inge Brækhus (studio musician)
- Gunnar Andreas Berg (studio musician)
- Kristin Pedersen (studio musician)

=== 2003 ===
- Wenche Myhre (veteran)
- D.D.E (pop music)
- Randi Stene (classic)
- Hege Tunaal (song)
- Jacob Young (jazz)
- Berit Opheim (folkmusic)
- Hans Petter Gundersen (studio)
- Tor Inge Rishaug (studio)
- Anne Krigsvoll (actor)
- Cecilie Lindeman Steen (dancer)

=== 2004 ===
- Ole Ivars (veteran)
- Dimmu Borgir (black metal)
- Live Maria Roggen (jazz)
- Jon Wien Sønstebø (studio musician)
- Terje Tønnessen (classic)
- Jan Bang (studio musician)
- Tommy Tee (rap)
- Annbjørg Lien (folkmusic)
- Line Tørmoen (dance)
- Laila Goody (actrice)

=== 2005 ===
- Inger Lise Rypdal (veteran)
- Stian Carstensen (studio musician)
- Tom Erik Antonsen (studio musician)
- John Pål Inderberg (open class)
- Grieg Trio (classic)
- WE (rock)
- Lars Martin Myhre (singer)
- Silje Nergaard (jazz)
- Terje Tjøme Mossige (dance)
- Bjørn Sundquist (actor)

=== 2006 ===
- Knutsen & Ludvigsen (veteran)
- Trygve Seim (jazz)
- Atle Sponberg (classic)
- Turboneger (rock)
- Ivar «Ravi» Johansen (rap)
- Tone Hulbækmo (singer/traditional folk music)
- Sidsel Walstad (studio)
- Horns for Hire (Morten Halle, Torbjørn Sunde, Jens Petter Antonsen) (studio musician)
- Anne Marit Jacobsen (theatre)
- Therese Skauge (dance)

=== 2007 ===
- Odd Børretzen (veteran)
- Oslo String Quartet (classic)
- Henning Kvitnes (pop music)
- Unni Løvlid (traditional folk music)
- The Brazz Brothers (jazz)
- Lene Marlin (open class)
- Knut Hem and Jon Willy Rydningen (studio musician)
- Marianne Nielsen (actrice)
- Charlotte Våset (dance)

=== 2008 ===
- Åge Aleksandersen (veteran)
- a-ha (pop music)
- Knut Buen (folkmusic)
- Elise Båtnes (classic)
- Jon Balke (jazz)
- Anneli Drecker (open class)
- Steinar Krokstad (studio musician)
- Morten Skaget (Morty Black) (studio musician)
- Hildegunn Eggen (actrice)
- Halldis Olafsdottir (dance)

=== 2009 ===
- Jahn Teigen (veteran)
- Malika Makouf Rasmussen (open class)
- Håkon Austbø (classic)
- Finn Sletten (jazz)
- Ane Brun (traditional folk music)
- Hellbillies (rock/roots)
- Kåre Christoffer Vestrheim (studio musician)
- Dorthe Dreier (studio musician)
- Monna Tandberg (actrice)
- Richard Suttie (dance)

=== 2010 ===
- Lillebjørn Nilsen (veteran)
- Marit Larsen (pop music)
- Alfred Janson (open class)
- Sinikka Langeland (traditional folk music)
- Nordic Voices (art music)
- Rita Engedalen (blues)
- Jonny Sjo (studio musician)
- Erland Dahlen (studio musician)
- Even Stormoen (actor)
- Suzie Davies (dance)

=== 2011 ===
- Jan Eggum (veteran)
- Eugenie Skilnand (dance)
- Sven Nordin (actor)
- Yngve Sætre (studio musician)
- Frank Brodahl (studio musician)
- Eli Storbekken (traditional folk music)
- Solveig Slettahjell (jazz)
- Henning Kraggerud (art music)
- Sissel Kyrkjebø (open class)
- Satyricon (metal)

=== 2012 ===
- Lise Fjeldstad (veteran)
- Helge Jordal (actor)
- Gry Kipperberg (dance)
- Tove Kragset (studio musician)
- Jan Erik Kongshaug (studio musician)
- Röyksopp (electronica)
- Det Norske Solistkor (art music)
- Eldbjørg Raknes (jazz)
- Valkyrien Allstars (traditional folk music)
- Susanna Wallumrød (open)

=== 2013 ===
- Anne Grete Preus (veteran)
- Arild Stav (studio musician)
- Lise Voldsdal (studio musician)
- Maja Ratkje (contemporary music)
- Olga Konkova (jazz)
- Odd Nordstoga (traditional folk music)
- Kaizers Orchestra (pop/rock)
- Hilde Marie Kjersem (open class)
- Ricardo Daniel Proietto (dancer)
- Ståle Bjørnhaug (actor)

=== 2014 ===
- Karin Krog (veteran)
- Ole Petter Andreassen (studio musician)
- Kim Ofstad (studio musician)
- Helge Sten (contemporary music/elektronika)
- Dag Arnesen (jazz)
- Sigrid Moldestad (traditional folk music)
- Bigbang (pop/rock)
- Hilde Louise Asbjørnsen (open class)
- Lars Øyno (actor)
- Marianne Kjærsund (dancer)

=== 2015 ===
- Indra Lorentzen (veteran)
- David Wallumrød (studio musician)
- Torstein Lofthus (studio musician)
- Bergen Filharmoniske Orkester (art music)
- Jaga Jazzist (jazz)
- Gjermund Larsen (traditional folk music)
- Raga Rockers (rock)
- Trio Mediæval (open class)
- Steffi Lund (dancer)
- Jorunn Kjellsby (actor)

=== 2016 ===
- Åse Kleveland (veteran award - music)
- Marte Sæther (veteran award - dance)
- Juni Dahr (veteran award - theater)
- Det Norske Kammerorkester (classical music)
- Frode Fjellheim (open class)
- Vidar Busk (jazz/blues)
- Ola Bremnes (folk)
- Karpe Diem (rap/hip hop)
- Nikolai Hængsle Eilertsen (studio musician)
- Kaja Fjellberg Pettersen (studio musician)
- Guro Nagelhus Schia (dancer)
- Merete Klingen (actor)

=== 2017 ===
- Bjørn Eidsvåg (veteran award)
- Kyrre Fritzner (studio musician)
- Martin Horntveth (studio musician)
- Rolf-Erik Nystrøm (art/contemporary music)
- Jørgen Munkeby (jazz/metal/impro)
- Anne Nymo Trulsen (traditional folk music)
- Madcon (pop/rock)
- Hanne Hukkelberg (open class)
- Guandaline Sagliocco (actor)
- Ole Willy Falkhaugen (dancer)

=== 2018 ===
There were a total of 8 awards in 2018, 1 veteran award and 7 others.

- Liv Glaser (veteran award)
- Erlend Apneseth (traditional folk music)
- Javid Afsari Rad (open class)
- Håkon Kornstad (jazz)
- Tor Egil Kreken (studio musician)
- Susanne Sundfør (pop/rock)
- Pia Elton Hammer (dancer)
- Anne Marit Sæther (actor)

=== 2019 ===
There were a total of 8 awards in 2018, 1 veteran award and 7 others.

- Casino Steel (veteran award)
- Trondheimsolistene (art/contemporary music)
- Tove Bøygard (traditional folk music)
- Hanna Paulsberg (jazz)
- Sondre Justad (pop/rock)
- Birger Mistereggen (studio musician)
- Siri Jøntvedt (dancer)
- Terje Strømdahl (actor)
