= Odin Records =

Norwegian jazz record company and label

- Founded: 1981
- Founder: Norwegian Jazz Federation
- Genre: Jazz
- Country of origin: Norway
- Location: Oslo

Odin Records is a Norwegian jazz record company and label founded in 1981 by the Norwegian Jazz Federation, when there were not many independent record labels in Norway. Only major international record companies were to be found in Oslo, so Odin soon became the most important national label for contemporary Norwegian jazz.

The catalogue encompasses jazz, improvised music, ragtime, punk. The bestseller is the internationally acclaimed Radka Toneff. In 1994 Odin Records was licensed to Curling Legs, owned by Knut Værnes, Morten Halle, and Helge Westbye.

== Discography ==
- 1981: Thorgeir Stubø, Notice (Odin NJ 4001–2)
- 1982: Dag Arnesen, Ny Bris (Odin NJ 4002–2)
- 1982: Radka Toneff and Steve Dobrogosz, Fairytales (Odin NJ 4003–2)
- 1982: Cutting Edge, Cutting Edge (Odin LP 04)
- 1982: Knut Riisnæs, Flukt (Odin NJ 4005–2)
- 1982: The Gambian/Norwegian Friendship Orchestra (Odin LP 06)
- 1982: Oslo 13, Anti Therapy (Odin NJ 4007–2)
- 1983: Masqualero (Odin NJ 4008–2)
- 1983: Anne Marie Giørtz Kvintett, Breaking out (Odin NJ 4009–2)
- 1983: Cutting Edge, Our man in paradise, Odin LP 10)
- 1983: Thorgeir Stubø, Live at Jazz Alive (Odin LP 11)
- 1983: Søyr, Cierny Peter (Odin LP 12)
- 1984: Espen Rud, Hotelsuite (Odin LP 13)
- 1984: Tamma with Don Cherry and Ed Blackwell (Odin NJ 4014–2)
- 1985: Anne Marie Giørtz Band, Tigers of pain (Odin NJ 4015–2)
- 1986: Lille Frøen Saksofonkvartett, 4 menn (Odin LP 16)
- 1986: Karin Krog and John Surman, Freestyle (Odin NJ 4017–2)
- 1986: Norwegian Radio Big Band, The Norwegian Radio Big Band Meets Bob Florence (Odin LP 18)
- 1986: Jon Eberson, Stash (Odin NJ 4019–2)
- 1986: The Brazz Brothers, Brazzy Landscapes (Odin NJ 4020–2)
- 1987: Bjørn Johansen, Take One (Odin NJ 4021–2)
- 1987: Oslo 13, Off Balance (Odin NJ 4022–2)
- 1988: Out to Lunch (Odin NJ 4023–2)
- 1987: Armen Donelian, Carl Morten Iversen and Audun Kleive, Trio '87 (Odin NJ 4024–2)
- 1987: Circulasione Totale Orchestra, Accent (Odin NJ 4025–2)
- 1988: Tore Brunborg, Vigleik Storaas, Olaf Kamfjord and Trond Kopperud, Lines (Odin NJ 4026–2)
- 1989: Elin Rosselands Fair Play, Fair Play (Odin NJ 4027–2)
- 1989: Odin Sampler (Odin NJ 4028–2)
- 1989: Brazz Bros, Live at Oslo Jazzhus (Odin NJ 4029–2)
- 1989: Dag Arnesen, Bjørn Kjellemyr and Svein Christiansen, Renascent (Odin NJ-4030 2)
- 1990: Extended Noise, Slow but Sudden – Langsam, aber Plötzlich (Odin NJ 4031–2)
- 1990: Morten Halle, Jon Eberson, Bjørn Kjellemyr, Finn Sletten, Blow! (Odin NJ 4032–2)
- 1990: Per Husby, Notes for Nature (Odin NJ 4033–1)
- 1991: Jon Balke, Per Jørgensen and Audun Kleive, On and On (Odin NJ 4034–1)
- 1991: Bjørn Alterhaug, Constellations (Odin NJ 4035–2)
- 1991: Talisman Group, Dating (Odin NJ 4036–2)
- 1991: Danish Radio Big Band, Nordjazz Big 5 (Odin NJ 4037–2)
- 1991: Ophelia Ragtime Orchestra, Plays classic ragtime & popular hits 1900 – 1931 (Odin NJ 4038–2)
- 1991: Orleysa (Odin NJ 4039–2)
- 1992: Knut Riisnæs / Jon Christensen – Featuring John Scofield and Palle Danielsson (Odin NJ 4040–2)
- 1991: Jazzpunkensemblet, Live at Rockefeller (Odin NJ 4041–2)
- 1992: Frank Jakobsen, Carl Morten Iversen and Rob Waring, Secret Red Thread (Odin NJ 4042–2)
- 1992: Rune Klakegg Trio, Anaerobics (Odin NJ 4043–2)
- 1992: Radka Toneff, Live in Hamburg (Odin NJ 4044–2)
- 1992: First Set, Going (Odin NJ 4045–2)
- 1992: Jan Gunnar Hoff, Syklus (Odin NJ 4046–2)
- 1993: Ingeborg Hungnes and Terje Venaas, Toner fra Romsdal (Odin NJ 4047–2)
- 1993: Orleysa, Svanshornet (Odin NJ 4048–2)
- 1993: Airamero (Odin NJ 4049–2)
- 1993: Lee Konitz / John Pål Inderberg / Erling Aksdal / Bjørn Alterhaug, Steps Towards a Dream (Odin NJ 4050–2)
- 1993: Knut Kristiansen, Monk Moods (Odin NJ 4051–2)
- 1993: Talisman Group, Vardøger (Odin NJ 4052–2)
- 1993: Odin Sampler 2 (Odin NJ 4053–2)
- 1993: Svein Finnerud Trio, Plastic Sun (Odin NJ 4054–2)
- 2017: Helge Iberg, Jazzkammer (ODINCD 9563)
