= Petter Pettersson =

Norwegian journalist

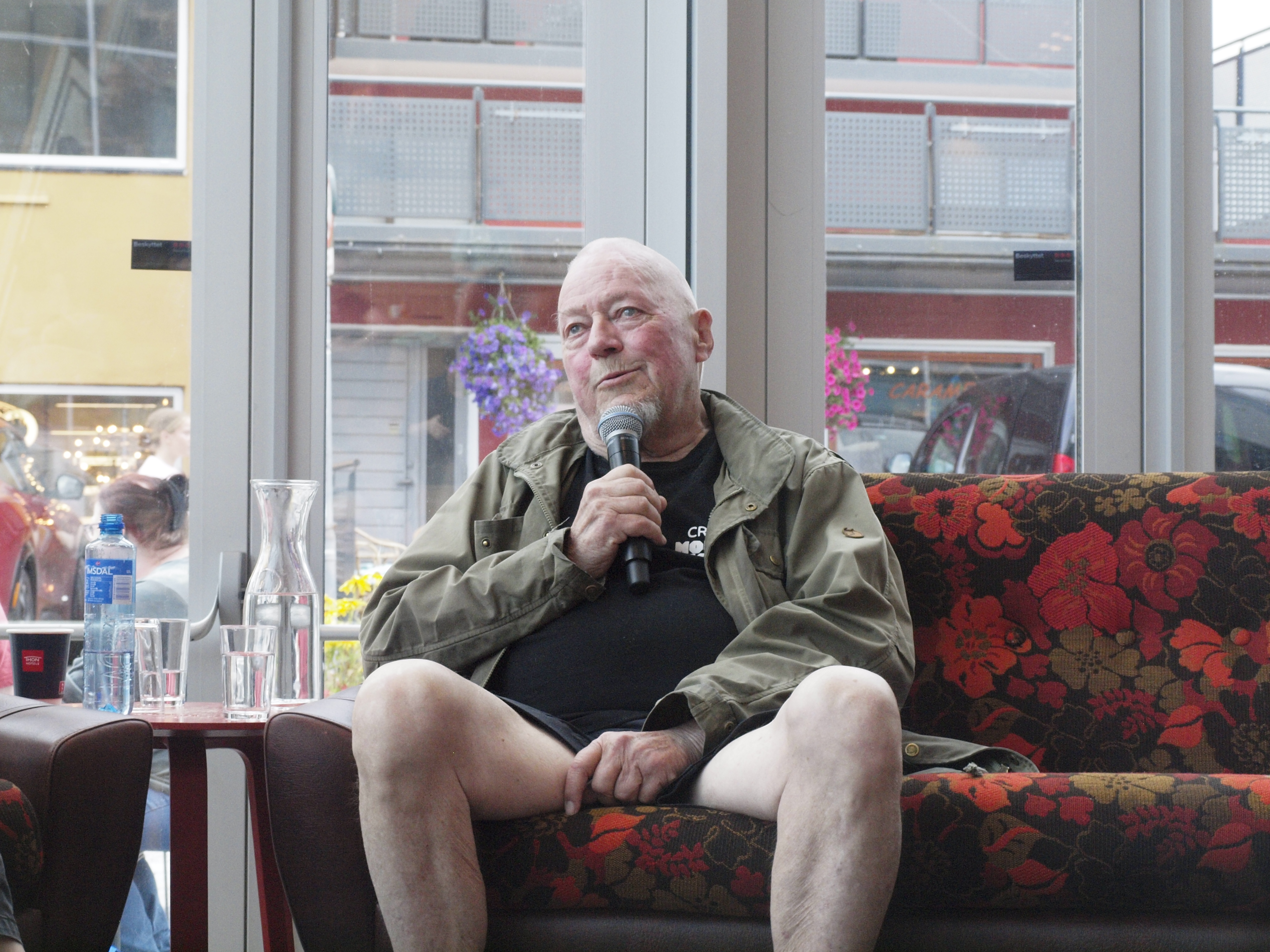
- Born: 21 May 1939 (age 87); Molde, Møre og Romsdal
- Occupation: Journalist

Petter Pettersson (born 21 May 1939 in Molde, Norway) is a Norwegian writer and cultural worker, trained in Oslo, Borås and London. Lately he has been active in journals on topics such as music, fly fishing and tourism as well as providing contributions to various books on various topics.

He has been part of Moldejazz since 1963 and earlier with the 'Storyville Jazz Club' and led the club dixieland orchestra. Nationally, he has been a director and deputy chairman of the Norwegian Jazz Federation and editor of the magazine 'Jazznytt' and later the 'Norwegian Jazz Forum'. He has also been engaged in business with offices in local and national organizations.

== Honors ==
- 2003: Buddyprisen honorary award
- 2004: Norwegian King's Medal of Merit in gold, awarded during the Moldejazz
