= Stokstad =

Stokstad is a Norwegian surname. Notable people with the surname include:

- Bjørn Stokstad
- Marilyn Stokstad (1929–2016), American art historian
- Ove Stokstad (1939–2018), Norwegian printmaker and jazz musician
- Trygve Stokstad (1902–1979), Norwegian boxer
