= Stamen & Pistils =

- Stamen & Pistils

Background information
- Origin: Washington, D.C.
- Genres: Indie rock, folk, pop, experimental, electronic
- Years active: 2002–present
- Labels: Echelon Productions
- Members: Raul Zahir De Leon; Miguel Lacsamana; John Masters
- Website: http://www.stamenandpistils.com

Stamen & Pistils are a three-piece electronic folk pop group from Washington, D.C.

Stamen & Pistils began in 2002 as a side project of Raul Zahir De Leon, whilst working on music as Radel Esca, Dead Artists, and with the Sugar Coated Bullets. Collaborations with Miguel Lacsamana on a few Radel Esca songs became a catalyst for the band. S&P became an outlet for a simpler songwriting process, opposed to the intricate sample based work of either Radel Esca's or the Sugar Coated Bullets' music. Over the next year, Stamen & Pistils became more of a serious effort as the duo began to focus more on songwriting together.

The band has shared the stage with bands such as The Dirty Projectors, Telepathe, Asobi Seksu, The Blow, Dear Nora, Yacht, and more. 2005 saw the release of their debut effort, End of the Sweet Parade, which was mixed with Derek Morton of the Mikroknytes, and gained them critical recognition by sources such as The Wire and The Washington Post. After their Autumn 2005 tour with Portions Toll, they released a split 7-inch single, entitled Fan Fiction, which features both bands.

In 2006, John Masters joined the band to fill out the live performances with drums and percussion.

Stamen & Pistils' second album, entitled Towns, was released in the Spring of 2007.

Both John Masters and Miguel Lacsamana play in the band, Metropolitan.

== Discography ==
- End of the Sweet Parade - 2005
- Fan Fiction (Split EP) - 2006
- Towns - 2007

== Personnel ==
- Raul Zahir De Leon (vocals, guitar, production, keys)
- Miguel Lacsamana (guitar, production, vocals)
- John Masters (drums, percussion)

== Influences ==
- Neutral Milk Hotel
- Animal Collective
- cLOUDDEAD
- Microphones
- Will Oldham
- Townes Van Zandt
- Paul McCartney
- Cat Stevens
