= Tore Jensen =

Norwegian jazz musician and bandleader

- Born: 19 May 1935 (age 91); Oslo
- Origin: Norway
- Genres: Jazz
- Occupation: Jazz musician
- Instruments: Trumpet, cornet, flugelhorn & vocals

Tore Jensen (born 19 May 1935) is a Norwegian jazz musician (trumpet, cornet and flugelhorn) and bandleader, known from a series of Dixieland bands and album releases.

== Career ==
Jensen was born in Oslo, and was first known through the local band «Hot Saints» (1953–60), whereupon he was involved in the band «Big Chief Jazzband» and «Norwegian Dixieland All Stars». Together with Bjørn Stokstad he toured with his own band as in Germany (1961), before the two established the eponymous Stokstad/Jensen Trad.Band (1962–), where all the members was honorary citizen of New Orleans (1984). They also played a series of gigs at Moldejazz from 1963, and a number of festivals and concerts outside Norway. He also worked in a swing jazz quintet with Svein Gusrud and Peter Opsvik, and played on releases by bands like «Norske Rytmekonger», «Swingkameratene», «Christiania 12» and «Mississippi Jazzband». He received Buddyprisen (1987), and was awarded Ellaprisen Oslo Jazzfestival in (2000), bl.s. to have cultivated young musicians within bands like Tore Jensens Shangri-La.

== Honors ==
- 1974: Spellemannprisen in the class Jazz, within Stokstad / Jensen Trad.Band for the album Mer Glajazz
- 1995: Buddyprisen

== Discography ==
Within Stokstad / Jensen Trad.Band

- 1973: Glajazz (RCA International), with Laila Dalseth & Wild Bill Davison
- 1974: Mer Glajazz (RCA International), with Laila Dalseth
- 1975: Nye gamle
- 1977: Blanda drops (Hot Club Records
- 1978: Selvskrevet
- 1982: Kraftjazz (Talent Records)
- 1983: Happy New Chair (Hot Club Records), (including Christiania Jazzband on the A-side)
- 2000: The Originals-1974, with Laila Dalseth & Wild Bill Davison
- 2002: At the Jazz Band Ball

Awards
Preceded by Thorgeir Stubø	Recipient of the Buddyprisen; 1995	Succeeded by Carl Morten Iversen & Terje Venaas
