= Masqualero =

Norwegian jazz group

- Origin: Oslo, Norway
- Genre: Jazz
- Years active: 1983–1991
- Labels: Odin, ECM
- Members: Arild Andersen; Jon Christensen; Tore Brunborg; Nils Petter Molvær; Jon Balke; Frode Alnæs
- Website: www.arildandersen.com/tag/masqualero

Masqualero (1983–1991) was a Norwegian jazz group. Originally named The Arild Andersen Quintet, the group soon changed its name to Masqualero in celebration of the Wayne Shorter composition. Masqualero recorded four albums, three of which were awarded the Spellemannsprisen. The group were considered an important influence on the evolution of Nordic jazz and have subsequently become known as a 'Norwegian supergroup'.

== Biography ==
Conceived by Arild Andersen (double bass) and Jon Christensen (drums) as a vehicle for their talents, the ensemble assumed a group dynamic with the inclusion of Jon Balke (keyboards), Tore Brunborg (saxophone) and Nils Petter Molvær (trumpet), all of whom contributed compositions to the group's recordings. The group dynamic was considered by Andersen to be an important component of Masqualero's sound, with a keen focus on musical interplay such that no single player was a soloist or leader.

Initially called The Arild Andersen Quintet, the group name of Masqualero was one that listeners inadvertently selected for the group. Interviewed in 2022 about the change of group name, Andersen commented:

We recorded the first album for the Norwegian jazz federation's own label, Odin. The record was called 'Masqualero' after the Wayne Shorter tune. People started to refer to the band as the Masqualero Quintet, so a couple of years later we decided to go for that name and it worked well in Scandinavia. But the second time we came back for a tour in England under the name Masqualero, nobody really knew that this was the same quintet touring the year or so before [...] Then I understood I should have kept the Arild Andersen Quintet name.

Balke left the group following the release of Bande À Part in 1986 to pursue his own musical projects, to be replaced by Frode Alnæs (guitar) on Masqualero's third album, Aero. The group performed as a quartet for their final album, Re-Enter, recording with neither a pianist or guitarist.

As frequent recipients of the prestigious Spellemannprisen, Masqualero are influential for being an early distillation of the Nordic or Scandinavian jazz style, a style which has continued to be developed by its original members through other musical projects and cultivated by Manfred Eicher's ECM Records more generally. Masqualero's recorded output remains highly influential among present-day jazz performers, including Tord Gustavsen and Petter Frost Fadnes. Critical appraisal of Masqualero reflects this, with their impact frequently deemed to be "seminal" and "ground breaking".

In recent interviews Andersen has expressed regret that the band changed its name to Masqualero, since both he and Christensen were well known in Scandinavia and even internationally. Recognition of Masqualero's music was therefore lower than it should have been, while the name also gave a false impression of the group's music. While performing in Santa Monica, Andersen has noted that audience members, who were unfamiliar with the group's music, thought Masqualero was a "Mexican salsa band".

== Honors ==
- Spellemannprisen 1983 for Masqualero
- Spellemannprisen 1986 for Bande a Part
- Spellemannprisen 1991 for Re-Enter

== Discography ==
- Masqualero (Odin, 1983)
- Bande À Part (ECM, 1986)
- Aero (ECM, 1988)
- Re-Enter (ECM, 1991)

Awards
| Preceded by Knut Riisnæs Quartet | Recipient of the Jazz Spellemannsprisen; 1982 | Succeeded by Laila Dalseth |
| Preceded by Per Husby | Recipient of the Jazz Spellemannsprisen; 1986 | Succeeded by Bjørn Johansen |
| Preceded by Oslo Groove Company | Recipient of the Jazz Spellemannsprisen; 1991 | Succeeded by Knut Riisnæs & Jon Christensen |
