= End of the Sweet Parade =

Studio album by Stamen & Pistils
- Released: August 9, 2005
- Genre: Indie rock, electronica, folk, pop
- Length: 27:35
- Label: Echelon Productions

Stamen & Pistils chronology
End of the Sweet Parade (2005)	Towns (2007)

Professional ratings
Review scores
Source	Rating
Bejeezus Magazine	
Stylus Magazine	

End of the Sweet Parade is the first album by Washington, D.C.–based indie folk pop band Stamen & Pistils. It was released on August 9, 2005, through Echelon Productions.

== Track listing ==
1. "Hand Painted Characters"
2. "Somewhere In Between the Beginning and the Middle"
3. "Peonies & Dahlia Petals"
4. "Penny Farthing Fair"
5. "Boys Vs. Girls"
6. "She the Widow, the Child Who Follows"
7. "Sleep for the Bells"
8. "Friction (pts 1 & 2)"
