= Bjørn Stokstad =

Norwegian jazz clarinettist and architect

Bjørn Espen Stokstad (born 13 April 1940) is a Norwegian jazz clarinettist and architect, married to visual artist Anne Weiglin.

== Biography ==
Stokstad was born in Oslo. From the 1960s, he was considered one of the leading clarinetist of traditional style in Norway. He started his own orchestra in 1962, and was 1964-85 together with Tore Jensen, leading Stokstad/Jensen Tradband, including trombonist Kjell Haugen, banjoist and singer Børre Frydenlund, bassist Svein Gusrud, and drummer Kjetil Lønborg Jensen. The two friends was also front figures in the tradjazz band Norske Rytmekonger 1985-94. Stokstad/Jensen Trad. Band was a concept within Norwegian traditional jazz in the 1960s, 1970s and 1980s. They were regular performers at a series of national and international festivals like Moldejazz and Nattjazz as well as in New Orleans.

== Honors ==
- 1974: Spellemannprisen in the Jazz category, with Stokstad / Jensen Trad.Band for the album Mer Glajazz

== Discography ==
With Stokstad / Jensen Trad.Band

- 1972: Happy Jazz (Karussell)
- 1973: Glajazz (RCA), with Laila Dalseth
- 1974: Mer Glajazz (RCA), with Bill Davison and Laila Dalseth
- 1975: Nye Gamle (RCA)
- 1977: Blanda Drops (Glajazz Fra Bach Til Beatles) (RCA International)
- 1979: Selvskrevet (RCA Victor)
- 1982: Kraftjazz (Talent)
- 1983: Happy New Chair (Hot Club Records) with Christiania Jazzband
- 2000: The Originals - 1974 (Herman Records), featuring Wild Bill Davison & Laila Dalseth

With Geirr Lystrup

- 1979: I Menneskenes Land (Plateselskapet Mai)

With Norske Rytmekonger

- 1986: Hot & Blue (NRK, Herman Records), Oliver / Morton / Armstrong / Etc / 1923-28
- 1988: Siemens Spesial: My Heart (Herman Records)
