= Jens Petter Antonsen =

Norwegian musician (born 1963)

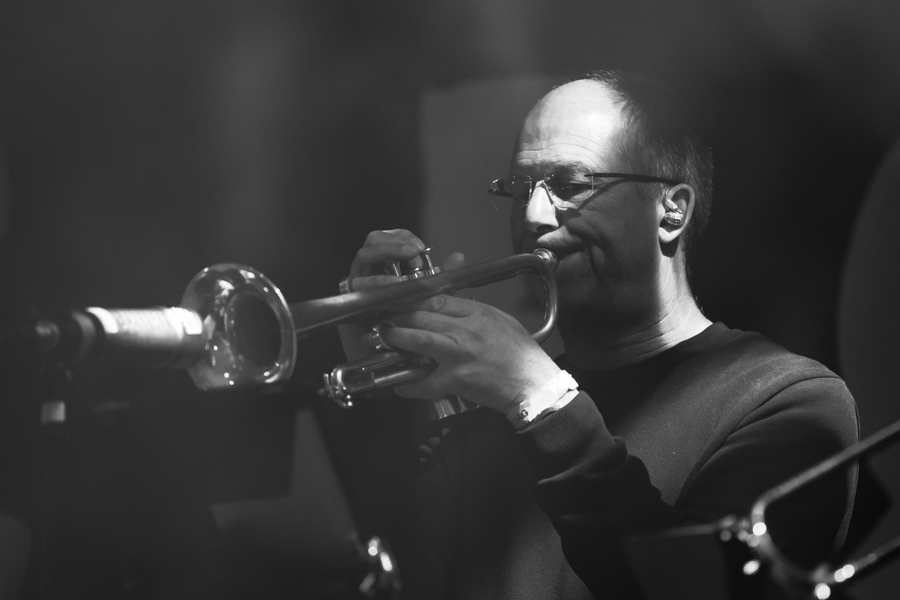
- Jens Petter Antonsen performing at the 2019 Kongsberg Jazzfestival

Background information
- Born: 2 August 1963 (age 63); Vang Municipality in Hedmark, Norway
- Origin: Norway
- Genres: Jazz
- Occupation: Musician
- Instrument: Trumpet

Jens Petter Antonsen (born 2 August 1963) is a Norwegian musician (trumpet), known studio musician from a large number of recordings and television shows. He is the son of bandleader Odd R. Antonsen, and brother of musicians Ole Edvard and Tom Erik Antonsen.

== Biography ==
Antonsen has played in numerous bands, like Mezzoforte, Chipahua, Vinni, Paperboys, Madcon, Karpe diem, Alejandro Fujentes, Soulslave, Dance With a Stranger, Jon Balke "Magnetic North", Mrs.Robinson, Jahn Teigen, Jens Wendelboe's Crazy energy (Vol 1, 1991), Oslo 13 og 1300 Oslo. Morten Halle's oktett, i Soul Inc, as well as the studio band Horns for Hire (recipients of the 2006 Gammleng-prisen).

== Discography ==
=== Antonsen Big Band ===
- Antonsen Big Band (2007)

=== Chipahua ===
- The Soul Survivors (1984)

=== Oslo 13 ===
- Live (1993)

=== 1300 Oslo ===
- Live in the North (2001)

=== Other collaborations ===
- Odd R. Antonsen Symphonic Band: Janitsjarsvisker Vol. 1 (1982)
- Brødrene Dal: Spektralplate (1982)
- Lava: Prime Time (1982)
- Amund Enger: Hvis jeg… (1983)
- The Monroes: Sunday People (1983)
- New Jordal Swingers: Movin’ On (1984)
- Øystein Sunde: I Husbukkens tegn (1984)
- Bobbysocks: Bobbysocks (1984)
- Arnold Børud: Balladen om Jesus – Rock-opera av Arnold Børud (1984)
- Lava: Fire (1985)
- Cirkus Modern: Trøst (1985)
- Banana Airlines: Vi kommer snart på hjem (1985)
- Bobbysocks: Bobbysocks (1985)
- Jan Harrington: Soularium (1985)
- Lars Mjøen & Knut Lystad: Perler for svin (1985)
- Anita Skorgan: Karma (1985)
- Lillebjørn Nilsen: Hilsen Nilsen (1985)
- Lava: Prime Cuts (1985)
- Hans Inge Fagervik: Drømma og karneval (1985)
- Øystein Sunde: Overbuljongterningpakkmesterassistent (1986)
- 3 Busserulls: Det glade vanvidd (1986)
- Pål Thowsen: Call Me Stranger (1986)
- Diverse: Drømmeslottet (1986)
- Øistein Boassen & Morten Halle: Blackout – Original Soundtrack From the Feature Film (1986)
- Kate: The Beauty and the Beat (1987)
- Steinar Ofsdal: Kalender (1987)
- Sigvart Dagsland: De umulige (1987)
- Viggo Sandvik: Fisking i Valdres (1988)
- Egil Eldøen: Egil Eldøen (1988)
- Banana Airlines: Banana Airlines flyr igjen (1988)
- Maj Britt Andersen: Folk er rare! 2! (1988)
- Finn Kalvik: Livets lyse side (1988)
- Busserulls: Hi-ha! Jo galare, jo bedre! (1988)
- Solfrid Hoff: Prinsessa i tårnet (1988)
- Øystein Sunde: Kjekt å ha (1989)
- Jan Bang: Frozen Feelings (1989)
- Steinar Ofsdal: Vestenfor måne (1990)
- Private Eye: Private Eye (1990)
- Bjørn Jens: Cappucino (1990)
- Maj Britt Andersen: Tamme erter & villbringebær (1990)
- Bjørn Eidsvåg: Tatt av vinden (1990)
- Børudgjengen: Virkeligst av alt (1990)
- Dag Kolsrud: December (1990)
- Odd R. Antonsen Symphonic Band: The Man with the Horn (1991)
- Jens Wendelboe: Big Crazy Energy Band, Vol. 1 (1991)
- Dag Kolsrud: December II (1991)
- Eli Rygg & Birgit Strøm: Julestri og adventstid hos Eli og Teodor (1991)
- Ole Paus: Biggles' testamente (1992)
- Jannicke: World of Wisdom (1992)
- Ole Edvard Antonsen: Tour De Force (1992)
- Backstreet Girls: Let's Have It (1992)
- Eriksen: Two Blue (1992)
- Knut Værnes Band: Roneo (1993)
- B-Flat: (Flow) (1993)
- Mulens Portland Combo: Blå stikke (1993)
- Catwalk: Checkin' Out of Line/Alibi (1993)
- The Last James: The Last James (1993)
- Reflex: Denne dagen (1993)
- Mezzoforte: Daybreak (1993)
- Jon Balke & Magnetic North Orchestra: Further (1994)
- Jens Wendelboe: Big Crazy Energy Band, Vol. 2 (1994)
- Maj Britt Andersen: Rippel Rappel (1994)
- Dance with a Stranger: Unplugged (1994)
- Guys in Disguise: Guys in Disguise (1994)
- Øystein Sunde: Du må'kke komme her og komme her (1994)
- Anita Skorgan: Julenatt (1994)
- Oslo Gospel Choir: Tusen julelys (1994)
- Oslo Gospel Choir: The Christmas Way (1994)
- Jan Rohde: A New Side of Jan Rohde (1995)
- Odd R. Antonsen Big Band: Feelin' Free (1995)
- Øivind Blunck & Tom Mathisen: Mysteriet med den falske bonden (1995)
- Mulens Portland Combo: Tired of the Blues (1995)
- Halle * Eberson * Kjellemyr * Thowsen: The Eagle (1995)
- Bjørn Jens: Rastløst blod (1996)
- Steinar Albrigtsen: Life Is Good (1996)
- Odd Børretzen & Anita Skorgan: Våre beste barnesanger (1996)
- Vazelina Bilopphøggers: Hææærli' på toppen ta væla (1996)
- Frode Alnæs: Frode (1996)
- Bugge Wesseltoft: New Conception of Jazz (1996)
- Ole Edvard Antonsen: Read My Lips (1997)
- Helge Iberg: Never Ending "West Side" Story (1997)
- Torbjørn Sunde: Meridians (1998)
- Ola Slaaen & Regn: Heart to Heart (1998)
- Stig Rossen: Julelys (1998)
- Oslo Gospel Choir: Julenatt (1998)
- Øivind Blunck: Fridtjofs helaften (1999)
- Oslo Gospel Choir med Calvin Bridges: Power (1999)
- POD: Organic (2000)
- D.D.E.: Jippi (2000)
- Ole Edvard Antonsen & TrondheimSolistene: New Sound of Baroque (2000)
- Vazelina Bilopphøggers: Hjulkalender (2000)
- New Jordal Swingers: Indigo (2001)
- Haldor Lægreid: On My Own (2001)
- Trøste & Bære: Med promp og prakt (2001)
- Torbjørn Sunde: Where is the Chet (2001)
- Miki N'Doye Orchestra: Joko (2002)
- New Jordal Swingers: Belfast Cowboy (2002)
- Diverse: Gyldne takter og toner (2002)
- Lava: Polarity (2003)
- Jan Werner: Singer of Songs (2003)
- Kor-90: The Soul of Christmas (2003)
- Halvdan Sivertsen: Frelsesarmeens Juleplate (2003)
- New Jordal Swingers: 45 Beste! (30 år med rock’n’roll) (2004)
- Paperboys: Wiggle It (2004)
- Chicas del Coro: Seven Days on the Road (2004)
- Seppo: Retrofeelia (2004)
- Paperboys: Tomorrow (2005)
- Paperboys: Keep It Cool (2005)
- Happiness Choir Project: Loveletter to God (2005)
- Paperboys: When Worlds Collide (2005)
- Øystein Sunde: Sundes verden (2006)
- De Dresserte Elger: Året rundt (2006)
- Øystein Sunde: Sundes verden – 52 av de aller beste (2006)
- Paperboys: So Far – So Good (2006)
- El Axel: Showtime (Move Your Arms) (2006)
- Endre Dåvøy and Øystein Lund Olafsen: Nye bryllupsmarsjer (2006)
- El Axel: It Is Wha It Is (2007)
- Dance with a Stranger: Everyone Needs a Friend… The Very Best of Dance with a Stranger (2007)
- Jan Werner: Eg veit i himmelrik ei borg – Frelsesarmeens Juleplate 2007 (2007)
- Maria Haukaas Storeng: Hold On Be Strong (2008)
- Diverse: Dansefestivalen Sel 2008 (2008)
- Diverse: De beste fra Uhu! (2008)
- Kor-90: Time For Peace (2008)
- Ole Børud: Shakin' the Ground (2008)
- Mezzoforte: Live in Reykjavik (2008)
- Bugge Wesseltoft: New Conceptions of Jazz Box (2008)
- Benedicte Adrian: Desember (2008)
- John Ivar Bye: Intakt (2009)
- Vagabond: Vagabond (2009)
- Paperboys: The Oslo Agreement (2009)
- Elisabeth Andreassen and Rein Alexander: Julenatt (2009)
- Bobbysocks: Let It Swing – The Best of Bobbysocks (2010)
- SwingLett: Spinning Wheel (2010)
- Ole Børud: Keep Movin (2011)
- Jan Groth: Mine julesanger (2011)
- Jon Balke: Magnetic Works 1993–2001 (2012)
- Vidar Busk: Paid My Way (2013)
- Eric «Slim» Zahl & the South West Swingers: Chances Are Slim (2013)
- Norsk Utflukt: Long Distance Call (2013)
- New Jordal Swingers: 11 sanger (2014)
- Oslo Gospel Choir: I Go to the Rock (2014)
- Ole Børud: Stepping Up (2014)
- Christiansen: I Wanna Know Ya (2015)
- Åge Aleksandersen and Sambandet: Det e langt å gå til Royal Albert Hall (2016)
- Freddy Dahl: Never (2016)
