= 1300 Oslo =

Norwegian jazz band

- Also known as: Oslo 13
- Origin: Oslo, Norway
- Genres: Jazz and big bands
- Years active: 1980-1993
- Labels: Odin Records, Curling Legs, ECM Records
- Members: Bror Hagemann, Nils Petter Molvær, Jens Petter Antonsen, Staffan Svensson, Geir Hauger, Torbjørn Sunde, Dag Einar Eilertsen, Thor Bjørn Neby, Geir Løvold, Morten Halle, Tore Brunborg, Odd Riisnæs, Nancy Sandvold, Erik Balke, Olav Dale, Arne Frang, Trygve Seim, Thomas Gustavsson, Rune Nicolaysen, Audun Kleive, Jon Christensen, Carl Morten Iversen, Jon Balke

1300 Oslo (active from 1979 in Oslo, Norway) was a Norwegian jazz band originally called Oslo 13 (1979–93), founded and operated the first two years by Bror Hagemann and continuated by Jon Balke. In 1994 the band got a joint leadership with Trygve Seim, Morten Halle and Torbjørn Sunde, and changed their name.

The band's first release was the album Anti-therapy (1981). Oslo 13 was awarded Spellemannprisen in 1988 for the album Off balance. The follow-up Nonsentration (1992) also was an acclaimed album. The last album from Oslo 13 was a live album from 1992.

== Band members ==
=== Woodwinds ===
- Morten Halle (tenor and alt sax)
- Tore Brunborg (tenor sax)
- Odd Riisnæs (tenor sax)
- Nancy Sandvold (baritone sax)
- Erik Balke (alto sax)
- Olav Dale (saxophone)
- Arne Frang (tenor sax)
- Trygve Seim (saxophone)
- Thomas Gustavsson (saxophone)
- Rune Nicolaysen (tenor sax)

=== Brass ===
Trumpet

- Bror Hagemann
- Nils Petter Molvær
- Jens Petter Antonsen
- Staffan Svensson
- Geir Hauger

Tuba

- Geir Løvold

Trombone

- Torbjørn Sunde
- Dag Einar Eilertsen
- Thor Bjørn Neby (bass trombone)

=== Rhythm section ===
- Audun Kleive (drums)
- Jon Christensen (drums)
- Carl Morten Iversen (bass)
- Jon Balke (keyboards)

== Discography ==
- 1981: Anti therapy (Odin)
- 1988: Off balance (Odin)
- 1992: Nonsentration (ECM)
- 1992: Live (Curling Legs)
- 2001: Live in the North (Curling Legs)

Awards
| Preceded by Bjørn Johansen | Recipient of the Jazz Spellemannprisen; 1989 | Succeeded by Egil Kapstad |
