= LoMsk =

LoMsk is a Norwegian folk rock band from Lom Municipality in Gudbrandsdalen established in 1982. Their sound is inspired by the folk traditions of the area which they mix with rock influences. Lars Bakke writes most of the materials for the band and his lyrics are influenced by Nynorsk Norwegian dialect and his tunes by traditional Norwegian traditional melodies, often taking inspiration from local legends and stories.

Their concept album Bukkerittet is based on Henrik Ibsen's Peer Gynt and their album Amerikabrevet on the theme of Norwegian emigration. The band was nominated for a 2007 Spellemannprisen award equivalent to the Grammies. In 2012, the band reunited for their 30th anniversary concert.

== Band members ==
- Reidar Svare - vocals, keyboards, flute, harmonica
- Hans Bakke - vocals, fiddle, keyboard.
- Jørn Steine - bass.
- Lars Bakke - vocals, acoustic guitar, mandolin.
- Trond Volden - drums.
- Ole Foss - fiddle, accordion.
- Jørn Kjonerud - electric guitar

== Discography ==
- 1994: Song om ei segn
- 1998: LoMsk
- 2004: Bukkerittet
- 2007: Amerikabrevet (reached #36 in VG-lista Norwegian Albums Chart)
- 2009: Lavrans dotter

Live albums

- 2012: Live - 30 år med LoMsk (reached #14 in VG-lista Norwegian Albums Chart)
