= Live Foyn Friis =

Norwegian singer, lyricist and composer (born 1985)

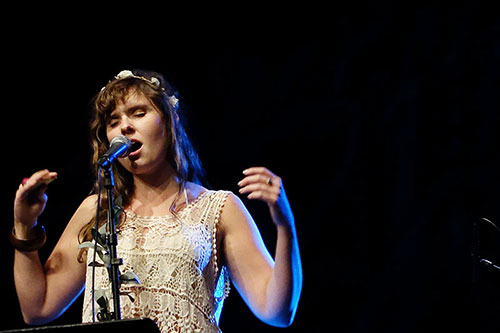
- Live Foyn Friis in 2015.

Background information
- Born: Asker, Norway
- Genres: Jazz
- Occupations: Singer, lyricist, composer
- Labels: Universal, Foyn Records, Curling Legs
- Website: livefoynfriis.com

Live Foyn Friis is a Norwegian singer, lyricist and composer, with roots in jazz, pop and improvised music.

== Biography ==
Friis was educated at the Conservatory of Music in Tromsø, Kungliga Musikhögskolan in Stockholm and Det Jyske Musikkonservatorium in Århus with a Master's degree in Rhythmic Vocals 2011. From the time in Tromsø, she performed concerts with several local musicians, including the groups AMOK, Live Friis & Co og Groove Design. During Bobby McFerrins tour in Norway in 2009 she was contacted by Rikskonsertene to sing a duet with him at the Culture House in Tromsø.

Friis is a singer and songwriter in the band Foyn Trio!, alongside Alex Jønsson (guitar, effects and vocals) and Jens Mikkel Madsen (double bass, vocals). She also leads the band Live Foyn Friis, comprising drummer Andreas Skamby, as well as the members of Foyn Trio!, besides the orchestra Live Foyn Friis with Strings, comprising the band members of Live Foyn Friis, as well Louise Grom (violin), Amalie Kjældgaard (violin), Mikkel Schreiber (viola) and Maria Edlund (cello)^{[}.

Friis performed with Danmarks Radio's Big Band in Concert Hall, Study 2 in Copenhagen 2012 and was awarded Årets unge jazzkomponist and Danmarks Nye Jazz Stjerne (Denmark's New Jazz Star). Foyn Trio album Joy Visible was nominated for Årets Danske Vokaljazz Utgivelse at the 2012 Danish Music Awards.

Friis has travelled to Brazil, the United States, and Europe (Spain, Iceland, Norway, Sweden, Denmark, Finland, Germany, Czechia, Poland, Switzerland, Slovakia, Italy, the United Kingdom and France).

Friis has released 4 albums: Joy Visible, Running Heart, With Strings and With Aarhus Jazz Orchestra.

In the summer of 2017 she was signed to Universal, and released the single Copenhagen under the artist Liive.

In 2018 her first album was released with a mix of standards and originals. The first more traditional jazz album, and it was already played on radio in the US and UK before the release date.

== Discography ==
Live Foyn Friis

- Running Heart (2014)
- With Strings (2015)
- With Aarhus Jazz Orchestra (2017)
- Foyn (2019)
- Værfast (2021)
- Live Sings Sassy (2022)

Foyn Trio!

- Joy Visible (2011)
- «Dementor» (2012) single
- «Ahaahee» (2013) single
- «Sailing» (2013) single

Foyn/Hess/AC/Sommer

- "Fooling Myself" (2018) single

[https://open.spotify.com/album/6HbVZTIbX8Fx1XmJ7lEDBH?si=diZ7sq5rTo2o176e16hVqg * «Willow» (2018) album

Liive (L!ive)

[https://www.youtube.com/watch?v=_wC9ZiAPXn0

- «København» (2017) single]
- «Tinka» (2018) single
- «Denne Julen» (2018) single
- «Gaslightning» (2019) single
- «Kaos» (2020) single
- «Enough» (2020) single
- «Divine» (2021) single
- «Høstkjærlighet» (2021) single
- «Umulig å gå» (2022) single

The Baby Zebras

- «Parents» (2020) album

Liis

- «I’m Fine» (2016) single
- «Bizetstrasse» (2018) ep

Rykte

- «Det går over» (2021) single
