= Bjørn Alterhaug =

Norwegian jazz bassist, arranger and composer (born 1945)

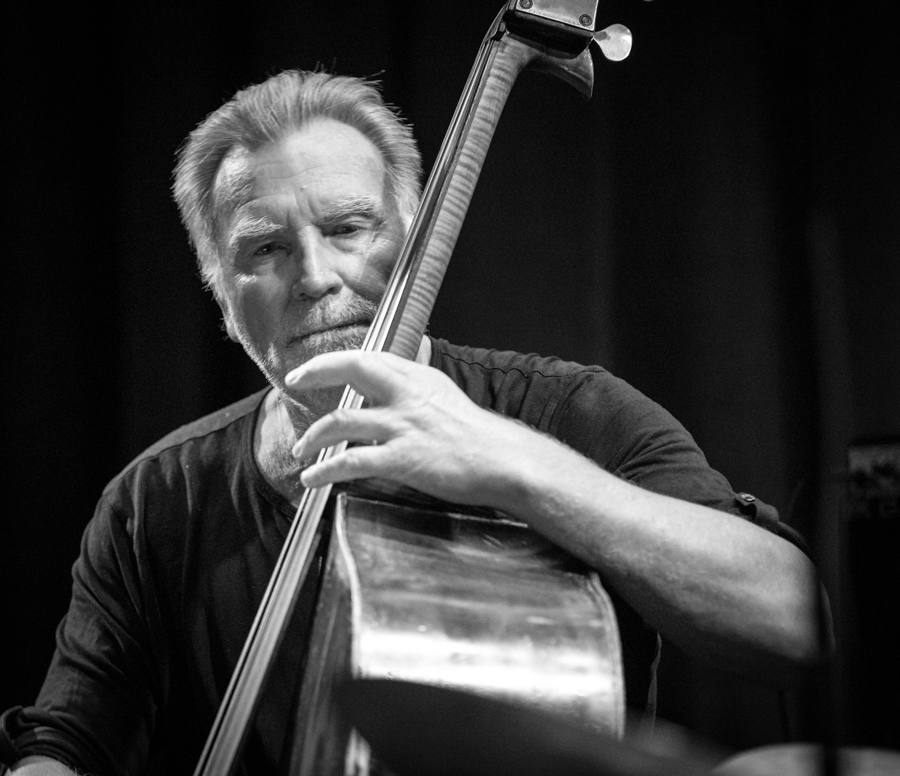
- Bjørn Alterhaug Quintet at Oslo Jazzfestival 2017.

Background information
- Born: 3 June 1945 (age 81); Mo i Rana, Nordland, Norway
- Genres: Jazz
- Occupations: Musician, composer
- Instrument: Upright bass
- Website: www.poncajazzrec.no/alterhaug

Bjørn Alterhaug (born 3 June 1945) is a Norwegian jazz bassist, arranger, composer and professor of music at the Department of Music in the University of Trondheim since 1972.

== Career ==
Alterhaug was born in Mo i Rana, Norway. He is one of the grand masters among European bassplayers and has been leading an international career in jazz since the late 1960s. He has played and worked with a great number of international greats such as Lee Konitz, Warne Marsh, Chet Baker, Thorgeir Stubø, Joe Henderson, Lucky Thompson, Sheila Jordan, Vigleik Storaas, Karin Krog, John Surman, Ben Webster and Clark Terry. He continues to lead his post as a professor at the Institute of Music at Norges Teknisk-Naturvitenskapelige Universitet in Trondheim, Norway and has taught on the Jazz programme there since the start in 1979.

== Honors ==
- Buddyprisen 1975
- Rana Municipality Culture Prize 1975
- This year's jazz musicians in Norway 1975 .
- Spellemannprisen 1980 in the class jazz for the album Moments (1979)
- Gammleng-prisen 1989
- Sør-Trøndelag County Culture Prize, together with John Pål Inderberg 2011

== Bibliography (in selection) ==
- Good morning, Duke (1999)
- A song - not too happy (1999)
- Bass means love (2004)
- A ballad (2004)
- Improvisation on a triple theme: creativity, jazz improvisation and communication (2004)
- Old Louis (2005)
- Moments (2005)
- Long ago (2005)
- Snake talk (2005)
- At the waters edge (2005)
- January morning (2005)
- Ballad to an old bass (2005)
- Maybe (2005)
- Epitaph (2005)
- Hymn to grotesque beauty (2005)
- Bluza 33 (2006)
- Mellom panikk og kjedsomhet (2006)
- Improvisation, action learning and action research (2007)
- Beep (2008)
- Kyrie (2009)
- Songlines (2009)
- Kyrie (2009)
- Bird lovers (2009)
- Shailén (2009)
- Message from a sad dolphin (2009)
- Christmas song for children of Thelonious Monk (2010)

== Discography ==
=== Solo albums ===
- Moments - (1979)
- A Ballad - (1986)
- Some Other Time, with Bjørn Johansen, Frode Thingnæs, Laila Dalseth, Ole Jacob Hansen and Egil Kapstad - (1991)
- Constellations - (1991)
- Steps Toward's a Dream, with Lee Konitz, John Pål Inderberg and Erling Aksdal Jr. - (1995)

With Bjørn Alterhaug Quintet

- Songlines (Ponca Jazz Records) - (2009)
- Innocent Play (Ponca Jazz Records) - (2014)

=== Collaborations ===
- Østerdalsmusikk, with Various Artists - (1975)
- Selena, with Ketil Bjørnstad - (1977)
- Til jorden, with Rolf Jacobsen and Egil Kapstad - (1979)
- Snjóuglan, with Snjóuglan - (1979)
- Frency only, with Åge Aleksandersen and Sambandet - (1979)
- Friends, with Kapstad-Johansens Quartet - (1980)
- Notice, with Thorgeir Stubø - (1981)
- Drøbak kassetten 1981, with Various Artists - (1981)
- Live at Jazz Alive, with Thorgeir Stubø - (1983)
- Norsk Jazz 1960-1980, with Various Artists - (1983)
- Veintetid, with Tove Karoline Knutsen - (1984)
- Epilog, with Egil Kapstad - (1985)
- For a Small Planet, with Trondheim Kammerkor - (1987)
- For the Time Being, with Warne Marsh - (1988)
- Fuglar, with Noble Noise - (1989)
- Blackbird, with Siri's Svale Band - (1990)
- The Jazz Sampler Vol. 2, with Various Artists - (1991)
- New Church Music from Nidaros Cathedral, with Various Artists - (1993)
- Remembrance, with Egil Kapstad Trio - (1993)
- Norske bilder - (1993)
- Pot's On, with Asmund Bjørken Sextet feat. Jan Erik Kongshaug - (1993)
- A Woman's Intuition, with Laila Dalseth - (1995)
- Min vemods fryd, with Jan Henrik Henriksen - (1996)
- Jazz Out of Norway, with Various Artists - (1996)
- Plays Norwegian Music, with Arctic Guitar Trio - (1996)
- Gemini - (1997)
- Notice/Live at Jazz Alive, with Thorgeir Stubø - (1997)
- Necessarily So..., with Siri's Svale Band - (1997)
- Over at Ola's, with Kevin Dean Quintet - (1997)
- Norsk tonekunst i kontraster, with Embla - (1998)
- Night Birds, with Totti Bergh - (1998)
- Gemini and Taurus - (1998)
- Round Chet's Midnight, with Hilde Hefte - (1999)
- Oslo Jazz Circle 50 år - (1999)
- Double Circle, with Ivar Antonsen - (1999)
- One of a Kind, with Laila Dalseth - (2000)
- Man, Woman and Child, with Tore Johansen - (2000)
- Early Years, with Ketil Bjørnstad - (2000)
- First Song, with Bodil Niska - (2000)
- Pictures, with Equilibrium - (2001)
- Playsong - (2001)
- Distant Reports - (2001)
- Advenio, with Vokal Nord - (2003)
- Hildes Bossahefte, with Hilde Hefte - (2003)
- Bjørn Johansen in Memoriam, with Various Artists - (2003)
- Wolfvoices, with Maiken Mathisen Schau - (2003)
- The Next Step, with Jon Larsen - (2003)
- Foot Prints - (2003)
- Wistful, with Hallgeir Pedersen Trio - (2004)
- Django Festival 3, with Various Artists - (2004)
- Blue, with Bodil Niska - (2004)
- Jazz Collection 1, with Various Artists - (2005)
- Like That, with Karin Krog and Tore Johansen - (2005)
- Sval draum, with John Pål Inderberg - (2005)
- Bluero, with Hallgeir Pedersen Trio - (2006)
- My Funny Valentine, with Chet Baker - (2006)
- On the Corner, with Hilde Hefte - (2006)
- Jazzsnadder, with Various Artists - (2007)
- Live in Oslo, with Lee Konitz and John Pål Inderberg - (2007)
- An Evening in Prague, with Hilde Hefte and The City of Prague Philharmonic Orchestra - (2007)
- Oslo Calling, with Karin Krog - (2008)
- Veckan 44, with Norsk/Svensk Cool Sextet - (2008)
- Arctic Bird, with Kjell Bartholsen - (2008)
- A Portrait of Jon Larsen, with Jon Larsen - (2009)
- Åge-boks 1, with Åge Aleksandersen - (2009)
- Black is the Color of My True Love's Hair, with Various Artists - (2009)
- Q (2009), with Henning Gravrok - (2009)
- Flight - (2010)
- Piano Pals (Ponca Jazz Records), with Oddbjørn Blindheim Trio - (2014)

Awards
Preceded by Asmund Bjørken	Recipient of the Buddyprisen; 1975	Succeeded by Laila Dalseth
Preceded by Laila Dalseth	Recipient of the Jazz Spellemannsprisen; 1979	Succeeded by Frode Thingnæs Quintet
Preceded by Magni Wentzel	Recipient of the Jazz Gammleng-prisen; 1989	Succeeded by Terje Rypdal
