= Metropolitan (band) =

- Origin: Washington, D.C., United States
- Genres: Indie rock
- Years active: 1999–present
- Labels: Crank Automotive
- Members: John Masters; Saadat Awan; Shyam Telikicherla; Miguel Lacsamana
- Website: Official band website

Metropolitan are an American four-piece indie rock group from Washington, D.C.

Metropolitan began as a collaboration between guitarists John Masters and Aidan Coughlan in late 1998, and they recorded and released their debut record, "Side Effects," in 1999. After undergoing several lineup changes since the group's incarnation, Metropolitan became a trio: Saadat Awan and Shyam Telikicherla joined the group. John, Shyam and Saadat played their first gig together in January 2001, and since then have shared the stage with numerous groups across numerous states, including the Dismemberment Plan, the Brian Jonestown Massacre, Bardo Pond, Tristeza, Gogogo Airheart, Wolf Colonel, The Bravery, The Rosebuds, Shout Out Louds, and Bis.

Metropolitan released their second full-length album, "Down For You Is Up," in March 2002. The album was recorded at Inner Ear Studios in Arlington, Virginia and produced by Chad Clark (Dismemberment Plan, Fugazi, Beauty Pill).

The third full-length, "The Lines They Get Broken," was released in 2005. It was produced by Archie Moore (Velocity Girl) and Jason Caddell (Dismemberment Plan).

Continuing to expand, Miguel Lacsamana joined the group in 2005 as well, adding additional guitar and keyboard talent to fill out the live sound.

== Discography ==
- Side Effects - 1999
- Down For You Is Up - 2002
- The Lines They Get Broken - 2005

== Personnel ==
- John Masters (guitar, vocals)
- Shyam Telikicherla (bass)
- Saadat Awan (drums)
- Miguel Lacsamana (keyboards, guitar)

== Influences ==
- Sonic Youth
- Pavement
- The Jesus and Mary Chain
- Spacemen 3
- Guided by Voices
- Yo La Tengo
- Unrest
- Television
- The Who
