= Jon Balke =

Norwegian jazz pianist (born 1955)

- Balke in 2024 (Photo by Birgit Fostervold)

Background information
- Born: Jon Georg Balke; 7 June 1955 (age 71); Furnes, Norway
- Genres: Jazz
- Occupations: Musician, composer
- Instrument: Piano
- Website: www.magnetic.no

Jon Georg Balke (born 7 June 1955) is a Norwegian jazz pianist who leads the group Siwan. He is the younger brother of saxophonist Erik Balke.

== Career ==
Balke performing in the Kunstsilo during the 2025 Punktfestivalen

Balke started playing classical piano but switched to blues at 12, though he performs within several genres. At the age of 18 he joined Arild Andersen's quartet. By the mid-1980s he worked on his own and would become one of Norway's leading jazz composers. He was active in the groups of Radka Toneff and in the Afrofusion group E'olén before joining Oslo 13 and Masqualero in the early 1980s. From 1989 he focused on his own projects, such as JøKleBa (with Audun Kleive and Per Jørgensen) and the Magnetic North Orchestra for which he composed the commissioned work Il Cenoneat to Vossajazz 1992.

Balke formed the percussion group Batagraf in 2002, and created the concept work Siwan with singer Amina Alaoui in 2007. He is also the creator of a series of multimedia concerts at Vossajazz festival, labeled Ekstremjazz. The concerts involve various practitioners of extreme sports, such as parachuting, paragliding, hanggliding, and BMX biking. In 2012 he was artist in residence at Moldejazz. In 2016 he launched the solo piano concept Warp the use of live electronics accompanying the grand piano in live performances.

== Awards and honors ==
- 1984: Buddyprisen
- 1993: Jazz Musician of the Year
- 2000: Edvard Prize in popular music – major works, for the album Solarized
- 2003: Oslo Bys kulturstipend
- 2008: Gammleng-prisen in the class jazz
- 2009* Jahrespreis der Deutschen Musikkritiker
- 2012: Artist in Residence at Moldejazz

== Discography ==
=== As leader ===
An asterisk (*) indicates year of release.

| Year recorded | Title | Label | Personnel/Notes |
|---|---|---|---|
| 1994 | Further | ECM | With Morten Halle (sax), Per Jørgensen (trpt), Tore Brunborg (sax) Anders Jormin (bass) Marilyn Mazur (perc) Audun Kleive (perc) |
| 1997 | Rotor | Curling Legs | With Morten Hannisdal (cello), Marek Konstantynowicz (viola), Henrik Hannisdal and Odd Hannisdal (violin) |
| 1998* | Saturation | Jazzland/EmArcy | With Nils-Olav Johansen (guitar, vocals), Fredrik Lundin (sax, flute), Sidsel Endresen (vocals) |
| 1999 | Solarized | EmArcy | Magnetic North Orchestra |
| 2002 | Kyanos | ECM | Magnetic North Orchestra |
| 2004 | Diverted Travels | ECM | Magnetic North Orchestra |
| 2006 | Book of Velocities | ECM | Solo piano |
| 2007–08 | Siwan | ECM | With Amina Alaoui (vocals), Jon Hassell (trumpet, electronics), Kheir-Eddine M'Kachiche (violin), Helge Andreas Norbakken (percussion), Pedram Khavar Zamini (zarb), Bjarte Eike, Per Buhre, Peter Spissky, Anna Ivanovna Sundin and Miloš Valent (violin), Rastko Roknic and Joel Sundin (viola) Tom Pitt (cello), Kate Hearne (cello, recorder), Mattias Frostensson (double bass), Andreas Arend (theorboe, archlute), Hans Knut Sveen (harpsichord, clavichord) |
| 2009 | Say and Play | ECM | With Helge Andreas Norbakken (sabar, gorong, djembe, talking drum, shakers, percussion), Emilie Stoesen Christensen (vocals), Erland Dahlen (drums), Torgeir Rebolledo Pedersen (poetry reading) |
| 2012 | Magnetic Works | ECM | Magnetic North Orchestra |
| 2014 | Warp | ECM | Solo piano and keyboards with field recordings |
| 2017 | Nahnou Houm | ECM | Second album with the Siwan concept |
| 2020 | Discourses | ECM | Solo album that further develops the methodology introduced on the Warp album |
| 2022 | Hafla | ECM | Third album with Siwan featuring Mona Boutchebak, Derya Turkan and Pedram Khavarzamini. |
| 2025 | Skrifum | ECM | Solo album that further develops the methodology introduced in the Warp and Discourses albums |

=== As co-leader ===
With Jøkleba

- 1991: On and On (Odin)
- 1993: JøKleBa! (Norsk Plateproduksjon)
- 1996: JøKleBa Live (Curling Legs)
- 2011: Nu Jøk? (EmArcy, Universal Music Norway)
- 2014: Outland (ECM)
- 2012: Magnetic Works 1993-2001 (ECM), compilation

With Batagraf

- 2005: Statements (ECM)
- 2011: Say and Play (ECM)
- 2016: On Anodyne (Grappa)
- 2018: Delights of Decay (Jazzland)

=== As sideman ===
With Radka Toneff

- 1979: It Don't Come Easy (PolyGram)
- 2008: Butterfly (Curling Legs), recorded 1976–77

With Masqualero

- 1983: Masqualero (Odin)
- 1985: Bande a Parte (ECM)

With Oslo 13

- 1983: Anti-Therapy (Odin)
- 1987: Off Balance (Odin)
- 1992: Nonsentration (ECM)
- 1994: Oslo 13 Live (Curling Legs)

With others

- 1975: Clouds in My Head (ECM), with Arild Andersen Quartet
- 1977: Hi-Fly (Compendium), with Karin Krog and Archie Shepp
- 1978: Høysang (NorDisc), with Lars Klevstrand and Guttorm Guttormsen Kvintett
- 1978: Club 7 jubileumsplate (Club 7), with Kråbøl and E'olén
- 1979: E'Olen (Mai), with E'Olen
- 1986: A Hip Hop (Dragon), with Göran Klinghagen
- 1991: Live at Rockefeller (Odin), with Jazzpunkensemblet
- 2002: Joko (ACT), with Miki N'Doye Orchestra feat. Paolo Vinaccia, Bugge Wesseltoft and Cissokho
- 2003: Trialogue (Imogena), with Lars Møller and Morten Lund - trio
- 2007: The Door (ECM), with Mathias Eick
- 2010: The Adventures of a Polar Expedition (Cowbell Music), with Hans Ulrik, Benjamin Koppel, Palle Danielsson and Alex Riel

== See also ==
- List of jazz pianists

Awards
| Preceded by Terje Bjørklund, Knut Kristiansen and Espen Rud | Recipient of the Buddyprisen; 1984 | Succeeded by Terje Rypdal |
| Preceded by The Brazz Brothers | Recipient of the Jazz Gammleng-prisen; 2008 | Succeeded by Finn Sletten |
