= Moldejazz =

Annual jazz festival in Norway

Molde International Jazz Festival Moldejazz
- Moldejazz logo
- Status: Active
- Genre: Jazz Festival
- Date: Mid July
- Begins: 15 July 2019
- Ends: 20 July 2019
- Frequency: Annually
- Locations: Molde Municipality, Møre og Romsdal
- Country: Norway
- Years active: 1961 – present
- Inaugurated: Founded 1960
- Website: moldejazz.no

Molde International Jazz Festival (MIJF) or Moldejazz (established 1961 in Molde Municipality, Norway) takes place annually in July, and is known as one of the oldest jazz festivals in Europe. It was initiated by the local Storyville Jazz Club. Since 1964 it has received government support, and the government Buddy Award was for several years awarded at this festival. To the extent Molde festival operates with records, is probably the bassist Bjørn Kjellemyr holder of "Most festivals in a row" musicians record. In 2015 he visits Moldejazz for the 17th time in row as performer. Two club gigs with Dag Arnesen's band is on the program for the versatile bassist. Guttorm Guttormsen (1974), Jon Balke (1975), Karin Krog (1978), Knut Riisnæs (1984), Terje Rypdal (1985, 1986, 1988) and Jon Eberson (1987, 1989) are among the artists he has visited Moldejazz through the years.

== Artist in residence ==
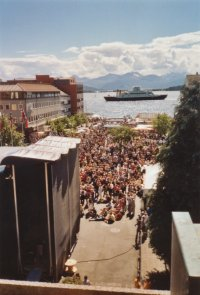
Free concerts at the Molde Municipality town hall plaza. The Molde panorama mountain range can be seen across the Romsdalfjord.

- 2000: Chick Corea
- 2001: Pat Metheny
- 2002: Paal Nilssen-Love
- 2003: Michael Brecker
- 2004: Håvard Wiik
- 2005: Arild Andersen
- 2006: Joshua Redman
- 2007: Terje Rypdal
- 2008: Marilyn Mazur
- 2009: Arve Henriksen
- 2010: Nils Petter Molvær
- 2011: Dave Holland
- 2012: Jon Balke
- 2013: Jason Moran
- 2014: Sidsel Endresen
- 2015: Mats Gustafsson
- 2016: Ola Kvernberg
- 2017: Vijay Iyer
- 2018: Maria Schneider
- 2019: Gard Nilssen
- 2021: Ellen Andrea Wang
- 2022: John Zorn
- 2023: Hedvig Mollestad
- 2024: Bill Frisell

== Frequently visiting artists ==
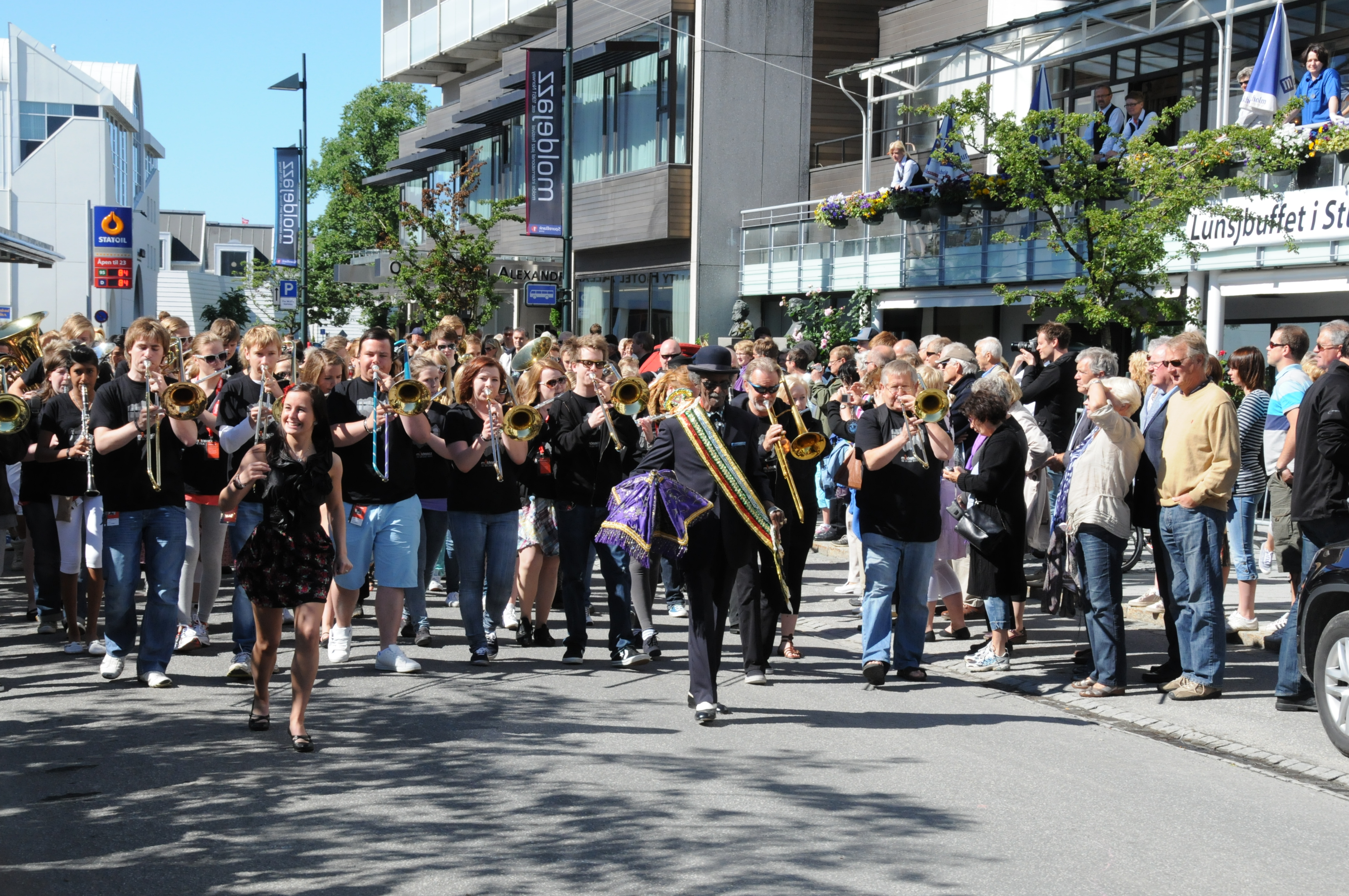
Street Parade at Moldejazz in 2010

- Asmund Bjørken (1961/62,65–68/70/74/79/80/93)
- Jan Garbarek (1964–66/68/69/71/75–78/80/82/85/88/90/94)
- Karin Krog (1963/68/70/71/78/84/87/97, 2008)
- Niels-Henning Ørsted Pedersen (1964–68/70–74/81/84/85/88–90/93, 2000/02)
- John Scofield (1984–87/89/90/92/95/97/99, 2006)
- Bjørn Kjellemyr (1974–)

The daily parade has for several years been led by New Orleans-musician Lionel Batiste.

== Recordings and compositions ==
Concerts have been broadcast to the EBU, the first was Guttorm Guttormsen's quintet (1974), later Jan Gunnar Hoff Group (1996). The NRK transmit daily. The composition Break of day in Molde (1969) was composed by Johs. Bergh and Karin Krog, based on Carla Bley's Ida Lupino. Live recordings include

- 1973: Sam Rivers Live Trio Sessions including Suite for Molde and Arild Andersen
- 1976: Carl Magnus Neumann's Live at Moldejazz 1976
- 1978: Muddy Waters, Three concerts
- 1980: Bill Evans in 1980 (The Oslo Concerts
- 1981: Arild Andersen and Bill Frisells A Molde Concert
- 1984: Miles Davis Band Fra Idrettens Hus (DVD)
- 1989: Hermeto Pascoal e Grupo
- 1991: Rick Danko, Jonas Fjeld and Eric Andersen (One more shot, 1991/2000)
- 1994: Farmers Market (Speed Balkan boogie, 1994)
- 2000: Merzbow/Jazzkammer, Live at Molde
- 2002/03: Michael Brecker (with Farmers Market 2002, directions in music 03)
- 2004: Paal Nilssen-Love, Twentyseven years later (2002), Pipes and Bones
- 2005: Trondheim Jazz Orchestra and Chick Corea, Live in Molde
- 2005: Matthew Bourne, The Molde Concert (2005)
- 2007: Peter Brötzmann, Chicago tentet at Molde 2007
- 2008: Chick Corea and Gary Burton, The New Crystal Silence
- 2010: Ytre Suløens Jassensemble, Live at Moldejazz

== Pop artists ==
Concerts co-occurring with the jazz festival include blues-, rock- and pop-musicians such as

- 1977: Muddy Waters
- 1986: James Brown
- 1989: Blues Brothers
- 1991: Motorpsycho
- 1996: Bob Dylan
- 1996: Van Morrison
- 1997: Eric Clapton
- 1998: Gipsy Kings
- 1999: Jeff Healey and Ray Charles
- 2000: Buena Vista Social Club
- 2001: B.B. King
- 2002: Paul Simon, Santana and Joe Cocker
- 2003: Ibrahim Ferrer
- 2004: Stevie Wonder
- 2005: Lauryn Hill
- 2006: Sting
- 2007: Steely Dan and Elvis Costello
- 2008: Patti Smith and Mary J. Blige
- 2009: Leonard Cohen, Jamie Cullum and Raphael Saadiq
- 2010: Jeff Beck, Karpe Diem and Missy Elliott
- 2011: Sinéad O'Connor
- 2012: Norah Jones and Janelle Monáe
- 2013: Bryan Ferry
- 2015: Robert Plant
- 2017: Aurora and Jarle Bernhoft
- 2018: Van Morrison and Motorpsycho
- 2019: Madrugada and Blood, Sweat & Tears

== Molderosen ==
Molderosen is an award established in 1967 awarded annually at Moldejazz to a person that during the festival helped to put Molde on the map.

== Literature ==
- Arild Steen, Molde jazz (Gyldendal, 1972)
- Terje Mosnes, Jazz i Molde two volumes (1981, 1991).
