= Karin Krog =

Norwegian jazz singer (born 1937)

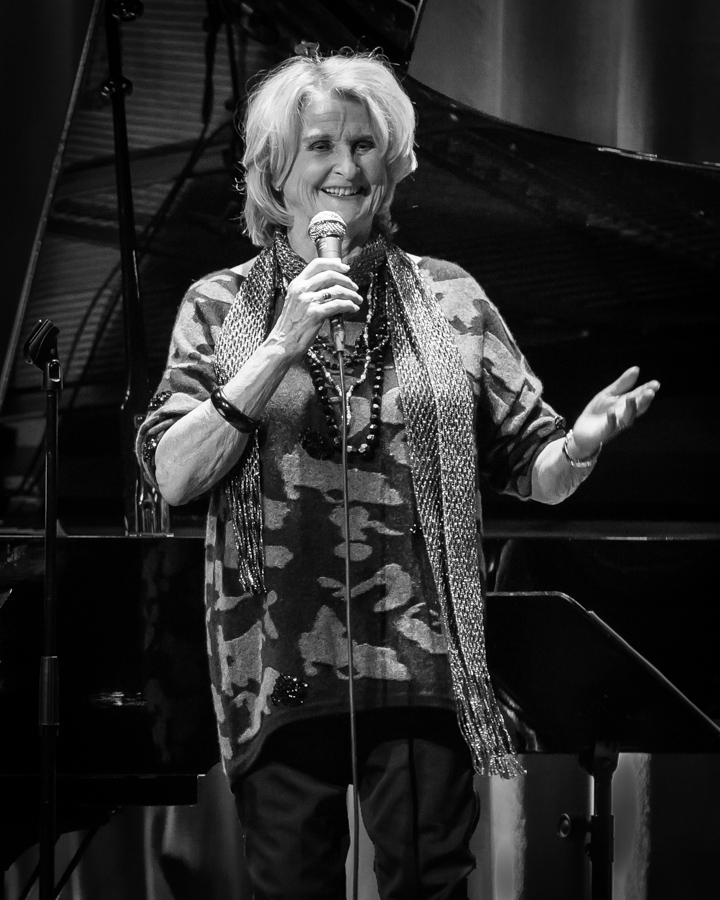
- Krog in concert in 2015

Background information
- Born: 15 May 1937 (age 89); Oslo, Norway
- Genres: Vocal jazz
- Occupations: Singer, composer
- Label: Meantime
- Website: karinkrog.no

Karin Krog (born 15 May 1937) is a Norwegian jazz singer.

== Life and career ==
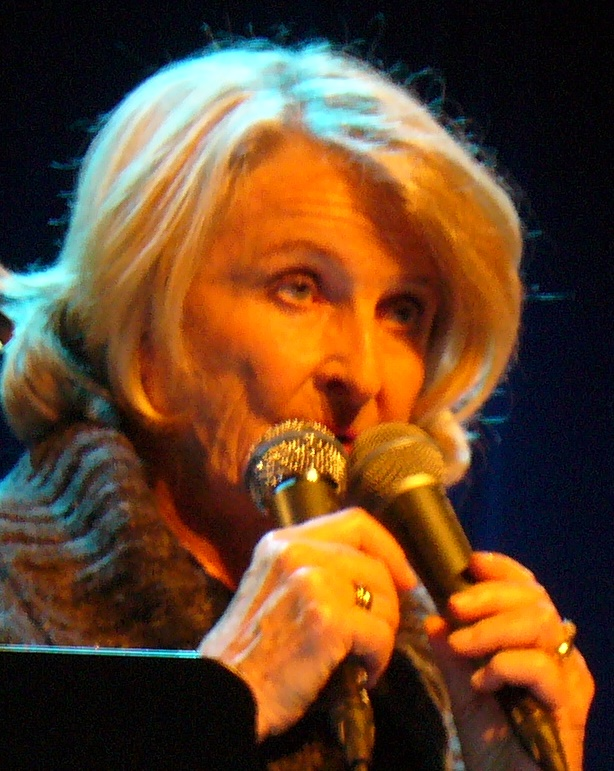
Krog with Bergen Big Band 2014

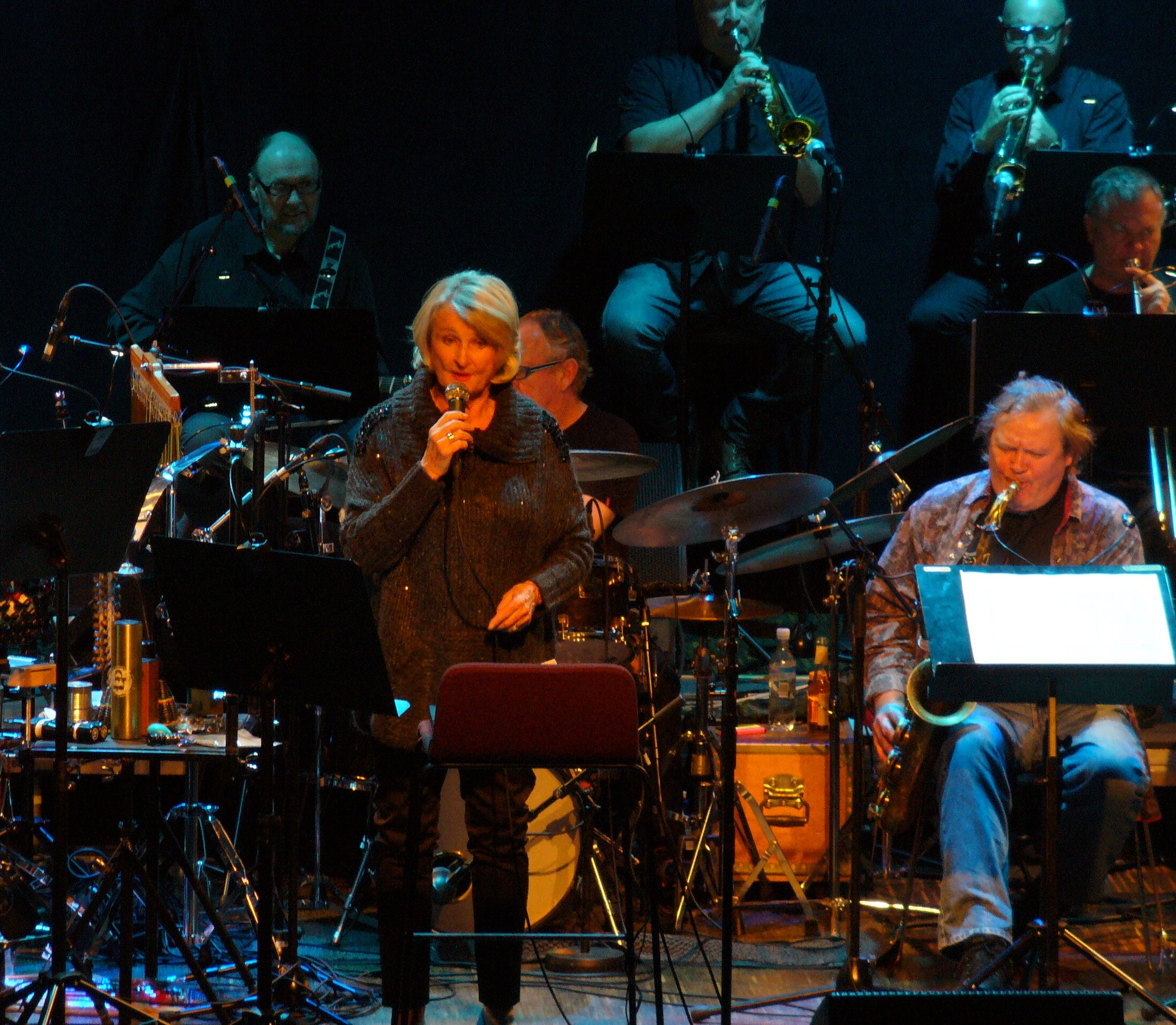
Krog with Bergen Big Band in 2014

Krog began singing jazz as a teenager and attracted attention while performing in jam sessions in Oslo. In 1955, she was hired by the pianist Kjell Karlsen to sing in his sextet. In 1962, she started her first band, and that same year she became a student of the Norwegian-American singer Anne Brown. Krog studied with Brown until 1969. In the 1960s, she performed with the rhythm and blues band Public Enemies, releasing the hit singles "Sunny" and "Watermelon Man".

She has worked with Vigleik Storaas, Jacob Young, Terje Rypdal, Arild Andersen, Jan Garbarek, Dexter Gordon, Kenny Drew, Don Ellis, Steve Kuhn, Archie Shepp, Paul Bley, John Surman, Niels-Henning Ørsted Pedersen, Red Mitchell, and Bengt Hallberg. In 1994, she became the first Norwegian musician to have an album released by Verve Records. The album Jubilee was a compilation of songs from her thirty-year career.

== Private life ==
Krog is the great granddaughter of Anders Heyerdahl (1832–1918), a Norwegian composer, musician, genealogist, folklorist and local historian. She was married (1957–2001) to the jazz journalist Johannes (Johs.) Bergh (1932–2001). Her long-term partner is British jazz multi-instrumentalist John Surman.

== Awards and honors ==
- 1965 Buddyprisen, Norwegian Jazz Forum
- 1969 DownBeat Poll Winners in Berlin
- 1970 European Poll Winners in Osaka
- 1971 Record of the Year, Some Other Spring with Dexter Gordon, Japan
- 1974 Spellemannprisen, Norwegian Grammy named Årets spellemann
- 1975 Female Singer of the Year, European Jazz Federation
- 1981 Oslo Council Artist Award
- 1983 Gammleng-prisen
- 1999 Radka Toneff Memorial Award
- 1999 Spellemannprisen, Bluesand with John Surman
- 2005 Knighted, Royal Norwegian Order of St. Olavz
- 2007 Anders Jahre Cultural Award
- 2008 Ellaprisen
- 2012 Spellemannprisen, honorary award
- 2013 Spellemannprisen, Songs About This and That with John Surman

== Discography ==
=== As leader ===
- By Myself (Philips, 1964)
- Jazz Moments (Sonet, 1966)
- Joy (Sonet, 1968)
- Some Other Spring with Dexter Gordon (Sonet, 1970)
- Live at the Festival (Enja, 1973)
- Gershwin with Karin Krog (Polydor, 1974)
- You Must Believe in Spring (Polydor, 1974)
- We Could Be Flying (Polydor, 1975)
- Hi-Fly with Archie Shepp (Compendium, 1976)
- Different Days Different Ways (Philips, 1976)
- A Song for You with Bengt Hallberg (Phontastic, 1977)
- But Three's a Crowd with Red Mitchell (Bluebell of Sweden, 1977)
- As You Are with Nils Landberg (RCA Victor, 1977)
- Cloud Line Blue with John Surman (Polydor, 1979)
- Swingin' Arrival (Talent, 1980)
- With Malice Towards None with Nils Landberg (Bluebell of Sweden, 1980)
- I Remember You... with Warne Marsh and Red Mitchell (Spotlite, 1981)
- Two of a Kind with Bengt Hallberg (Four Leaf Clover, 1982)
- Freestyle (Odin, 1986)
- Something Borrowed...Something New (Meantime, 1989)
- Nordic Quartet with Terje Rypdal, John Surman, (ECM, 1995)
- Det Var En Gang (NorDisc, 1995)
- Bluesand with John Surman (Meantime, 1999)
- Where Flamingos Fly with Jacob Young (Grappa, 2002)
- Where You At? (Enja, 2003)
- Together Again with Steve Kuhn (Grappa, 2006)
- Wildenvey I Ord Og Toner (Grappa, 2007)
- Such Winters of Memory with John Surman, Pierre Favre (ECM, 2008)
- Oslo Calling (Meantime, 2008)
- Folkways (Meantime, 2010)
- Cabin in the Sky with Bengt Hallberg (Gazell, 2011)
- In a Rag Bag with Morten Gunnar Larsen (Meantime, 2012)
- New York Moments with Steve Kuhn (Enja, 2013)
- Songs About This and That with John Surman (Meantime, 2013)
- Break of Day with Steve Kuhn (Meantime, 2014)
- The Best Things in Life with Scott Hamilton (Stunt, 2016)
- Infinite Paths with John Surman (Meantime, 2016)

=== As guest ===
- Bergen Big Band, Seagull (Grappa, 2005)
- Tore Johansen, Man, Woman, and Child (Gemini, 2000)
- Tore Johansen, Like That (Gemini, 2005)

Awards
Preceded by Øistein Ringstad	Recipient of the Jazz Buddyprisen; 1965	Succeeded by No award in 1966
Preceded by Jan Garbarek	Recipient of the Jazz Gammleng-prisen; 1983	Succeeded by Arild Andersen
Preceded by Espen Ruud Sextett	Recipient of the Jazz Spellemannprisen; 1999	Succeeded by Petter Wettre and Per Oddvar Johansen
Preceded by Kirsten Bråten Berg	Recipient of the Radka Toneff Memorial Award; 1999	Succeeded by Per Jørgensen
Preceded by Sidsel Endresen and Stian Westerhus	Recipient of the Jazz Spellemannprisen; 2013	Succeeded by Marius Neset and Trondheim Jazz Orchestra
