= Søyr =

Norwegian musical group

- Origin: Trondheim, Norway
- Genres: Jazz and big bands
- Years active: 1976-
- Labels: Odin; Curling Legs; ECM
- Members: Elin Rosseland; Torgrim Sollid; Jan Andresen; Nils Jansen; Bodil Vossgård; Rob Waring; Rune Klakegg; Tor Mathisrud; Frank Jakobsen; Tom Olstad; Edvard Askeland; Eldbjørg Raknes; Morten Halle; Vidar Johansen; Astrid Kvalbein; Christian Jaksjø; Erling Aksdal; Guro Gravem Johansen; Knut Aalefjær; Per Einar Watle; Børge Petersen-Øverleir; Torstein Lofthus
- Website: www.groove.no/band/13671152/s-yr

Søyr (established 1976 in Trondheim, Norway) is a Norwegian musical group, led from the start of trumpeter Torgrim Sollid.

== Biography ==
Søyr was initially inspired by folk music from Stor-Elvdal Municipality (among others Ole Mørk Sandvik) and released the album Søyr (1977) and Cierny Peter (1983), and performed at Kongsberg Jazzfestival 1977. The band is still active, and was involved on tour in South Africa in the summer of 2004. The Free State «Søyr» was established in Moldejazz 1997.

The band moved (with leader Sollid) to Oslo and assumed a more avant-garde style with a big band flair. Dag Arnesen was in the lineup 1981–82, and also Kenny Wheeler played within Søyr for four years. «Nye Søyr» released compositions by Vidar Johansen, Rune Klakegg, Torgrim Sollid, Rob Waring and Jon Balke på platen Vectors (1988) with the original lineup. Then came the 25-year anniversary with a new album Alene hjemme (2001).

== Original lineup ==
- Elin Rosseland - vocals
- Tove Karoline Knutsen - vocals (album 1)
- Torgrim Sollid - trumpet (album 1)
- Åge Midtgård - trumpet (album 1)
- John Pål Inderberg - soprano saxophone & tenor saxophone (album 1)
- Ove Stokstad - soprano saxophone, tenor saxophone & baritone saxophone (album 1)
- Tore Engstrøm - alto saxophone (album 1)
- Nils Tro - tenor saxophone (album 1)
- Tor A. Ramstad - baritone saxophone
- Jan Andresen - saxophones and bass clarinet
- Nils Jansen - saxophones and bass clarinet
- Per Gamre - trombone (album 1)
- Bodil Vossgård - cello
- Rob Waring - vibraphone and percussion
- Morten Lassem - piano (album 1)
- Rune Klakegg - piano and synth
- Bjørn Alterhaug - double bass (album 1)
- Tor Mathisrud - double bass
- Carl Haakon Waadeland - drums (album 1)
- Frank Jakobsen - drums
- Tom Olstad - drums

== New members ==
- Edvard Askeland - bass (album 2 & 3)
- Eldbjørg Raknes - vocals (1994–96)
- Morten Halle - saxophone (album 2 & 3)
- Vidar Johansen - saxophone (1991–)
- Astrid Kvalbein - vocals (album 3)
- Christian Jaksjø - trombone (album 3)
- Guro Gravem Johansen - vocals (album 3)
- Knut Aalefjær - drums and percussion
- Per Einar Watle - guitar
- Erling Aksdal - piano
- Børge Petersen-Øverleir - guitar
- Torstein Lofthus - drums

== Discography ==
- 1977: Søyr (MAI 7705)
- 1983: Cierny Peter (Odin LP 12), recorded live at Stavanger Jazz Club.
- 1987: Vectors (Hot Club Records)
- 1994: Bussene lengter hjem (Curling Legs)
- 1997: Med kjøtt og kjærlighet (Curling Legs), with the poetry of Niels Fredrik Dahl and Torgeir Rebolledo Pedersen
- 2001: Alene hjemme (Curling Legs)
