= Rob Waring =

American-Norwegian musician (born 1956)

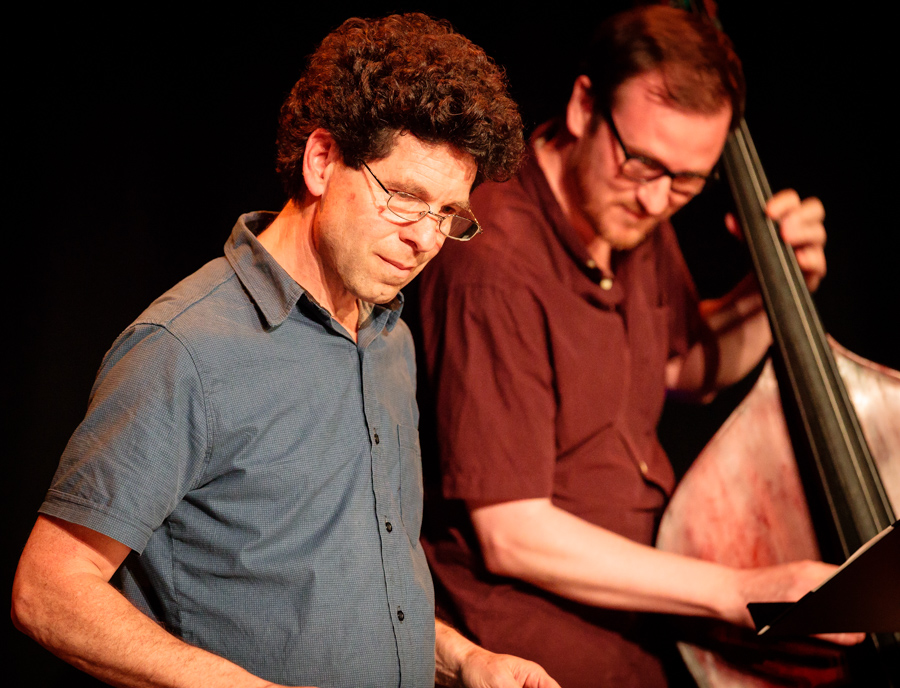
- Waring at the 2017 Kongsberg Jazzfestival

Background information
- Born: December 3, 1956 (age 69); Yonkers, New York, United States
- Genres: Contemporary music, jazz
- Occupations: Musician, composer
- Instruments: Vibraphone, marimba, percussion
- Website: www.robwaring.info

Rob Waring (born December 3, 1956, in Yonkers, New York) is an American-Norwegian Contemporary music composer and performer (drums and vibraphone), commonly associated with symphony orchestras and jazz ensembles.

== Career ==
Waring studied with Roland Kohloff, who had just become timpanist of the New York Philharmonic, while still in high school. Then he continued studies on percussion at the Juilliard School with Saul Goodman and Elden "Buster" Bailey (1974–79), and earned his Bachelor and Master of Music Degrees. During that period, he also took elective courses in composition with Stanley Wolfe, and studied jazz vibraphone in 1975 with Dave Samuels. He started a career as a freelance musician in New York, and worked in symphony orchestras, jazz groups, ensembles for new music, and an experimental ensemble for homemade instruments.

In 1981, Waring moved to Oslo and since then has participated on numerous recordings and established the Rob Waring Trio with Frank Jakobsen and Carl Morten Iversen (1987–). He teaches at Norges Musikkhøgskole, and has played in bands like Søyr and contributed on releases by Erik Wøllo (1983), Espen Rud (1984), Torgrim Sollid (1983), Rune Klakegg, Tone Hulbækmo (1986), Arve Moen Bergset (1987), Kjell Samkopf (1987), Morten Halle (1988), Lasse Thoresen (1994), Peter Opsvik (1999), Lars Klevstrand (2000), Torbjørn Sunde oktett (2001), Elin Rosseland (2004), SKRUK (2004), and on the Jon Larsen records Strange News From Mars (2007) and The Jimmy Carl Black Story (2008). At the Vossajazz 2014, Waring joined Mats Eilertsen's Rubicon, for the commissioned work.

== Works (in selection) ==
- 1984: Concerto for Vibraphone and Chamber orchestra
- 1996: Sonomatrix, electronic installation at the Henie-Onstad Art Center in Bærum, Norway
- 1997: Sikoté Sukán, for percussion trio
- 2003: Sax Cycles, for 2 saxophones and electronics
- 2005: Jalan Pantai Sari, quartertone-marimba duet
- 2006: Braided Streams, for viola, contrabass and marimba
- 2009: Frekoté Vokán, guitar duet
- 2011: Wellspring, guitar trio
- 2011: Three Narratives for Solo Harp
- 2013: Point of Departure, duet for vibraphone and marimba

== Discography (in selection) ==
=== Solo albums ===
Rob Waring Trio

- 1992: Secret Red Thread (Odin)
- 2001: Synchronize Your Watches (Resonant)

=== Collaborations ===
Trio with Jan Wiese and Erik Wøllo

- 1984: Wiese – Wøllo – Waring Trio (Maza)

With Octoband

- 1986: Octoband (Aurora), including with Guttorm Kittelsen, Aasmund Feidje, Kjell Samkopf, Andreas Rønningen, Morten Gunnar Larsen and Bjørn Kjellemyr

With Søyr

- 1988: Vectors (Hot Club)
- 2001: Alene Hjemme (Curling Legs)

With Metropolitan

- 1999: Metropolitan (Columbia)
- 2004: Love Is Blind (Curling Legs)

With Torbjørn Sunde Octet

- 2001: Where Is the Chet (Kirkelig Kulturverksted)

With Elin Rosseland

- 2004: Moment (NorCD)
- 2007: Elin Rosseland Trio (NorCD)

With Jon Eberson Trio

- 2009: Born to Be Slow (NorCD)

With Stian Omenås

- 2012: Klangkammer 1 (NorCD)

With John Surman

- Invisible Threads (ECM, 2018)
