= Queen Sonja Singing Competition =

Music competition held in Oslo, Norway

The Queen Sonja Singing Competition (formerly Queen Sonja International Music Competition) is a music competition for young singers taking place every two years in Oslo, Norway. The competition was arranged for the first time in 1988. Participants are selected by a screening committee on the basis of recordings submitted in the application process. 40 singers are invited to participate in the competition. The competition programme includes preliminary rounds, a semi-final and final, as well as masterclasses, career development sessions, concerts and social events. The last competition was 11-12 June (online preliminary rounds) and in Oslo 15 - 22 August 2025. The next competition will be held in 2027.

== History ==
The Queen Sonja Singing Competition was founded in 1988. Among the initiators was Mariss Jansons, former music director and principal conductor of the Oslo Philharmonic Orchestra. At the time, the Norwegian classical music scene was experiencing a period of increased internationalization. The aim of the competition was to create an international arena for music in Norway, which could present young musicians, give Norwegian soloists an opportunity to be assessed at an international level, and attract greater international focus on the Norwegian classical music scene.

The competition was created as a joint project between several Norwegian music institutions, including the Norwegian National Opera and Ballet, the Oslo Philharmonic Orchestra, the Norwegian Academy of Music, the Norwegian Broadcasting Corporation (NRK), the Lindeman Foundation and the Norwegian Society for Soloists.

The first two competitions in 1988 and 1992 were organized for pianists. Marking the centenary of the birth of Norwegian soprano Kirsten Flagstad in 1995, the competition has since then been arranged for singers. Until 2007, national competitions were arranged prior to the international competition.

The competition changed its name to the Queen Sonja Singing Competition in 2022, in conjunction with a new logo and visual profile.

The competition is currently arranged every two years in cooperation with the Norwegian National Opera and Ballet, the Oslo Philharmonic, the Norwegian Academy of Music, Oslo National Academy of the Arts and the Norwegian Broadcasting Corporation.

Held biannually in Oslo, the Competition draws on its global network of opera companies, conservatoires and professionals to bring together 40 young promising singers from around the world.

Previous prize-winners include, among others, Argentinian soprano Virginia Tola (1999), Norwegian soprano Marita Kvarving Sølberg (2001), German tenor Daniel Behle (2005), Russian soprano Olga Mykytenko (2003), Canadian soprano Maesha Brueggergosman (2001), Norwegian baritone Audun Iversen (2007) and Norwegian soprano Lise Davidsen (2015).

== Organisation ==
The Queen Sonja Singing Competition is organised as a non-profit foundation headed by the Board of Directors.

The Council currently consists of Astrid Kvalbein (Dean, the Norwegian Academy of Music), Joachim Kwetzinsky (National Federation of Norwegian Musical Soloists), Rolf Lennart Stensø (NRK), Anna Einarsson (Dean, Oslo National Academy of the Arts), Geir Bergkastet (The Norwegian National Opera & Ballet), Knut Skansen (director, the Oslo Philharmonic), and Frederik Zimmer (The Lindeman Foundation).

== Prizes ==
1st prize: €50 000

2nd prize: €10 000

3rd prize: €5 000

Finalist prizes: €1 500

Prize for the best performance of Lied: €1 500

The Ingrid Bjoner Scholarship (awarded to the best Norwegian competitor): NOK 100 000

In addition, prize-winners receive engagements with Norwegian orchestras and opera companies.

== Contributors ==
The Queen Sonja Singing Competition's main contributor is the Norwegian Ministry of Culture. The competition also receives private funding from Canica AS, Tom Wilhelmsen's Foundation, Lucy Høegh Foundation, Anders Sveaas' Almennyttige Fond and Lindemans Legat.

== Collaborating Opera Academies ==
The Queen Sonja Singing Competition collaborates with opera academies in Europe and the US. The collaborating academies nominate up to two of their best singers to the competition. These singers are admitted directly to the preliminary rounds of the competition and do not have to go through the regular application procedure.

The collaborating opera academies are:

Jette Parker Young Artists Programme, Royal Opera House, London

Lindemann Young Artist Development Program, Metropolitan Opera, New York

The Opera Studio, Bayerische Staatsoper, Munich

Internationales Operastudio, Opernhaus Zürich, Zurich

International Opera Studio, Staatsoper Unter den Linden, Berlin

National Opera Studio, London

Dutch National Opera Studio, Amsterdam

== Jury ==
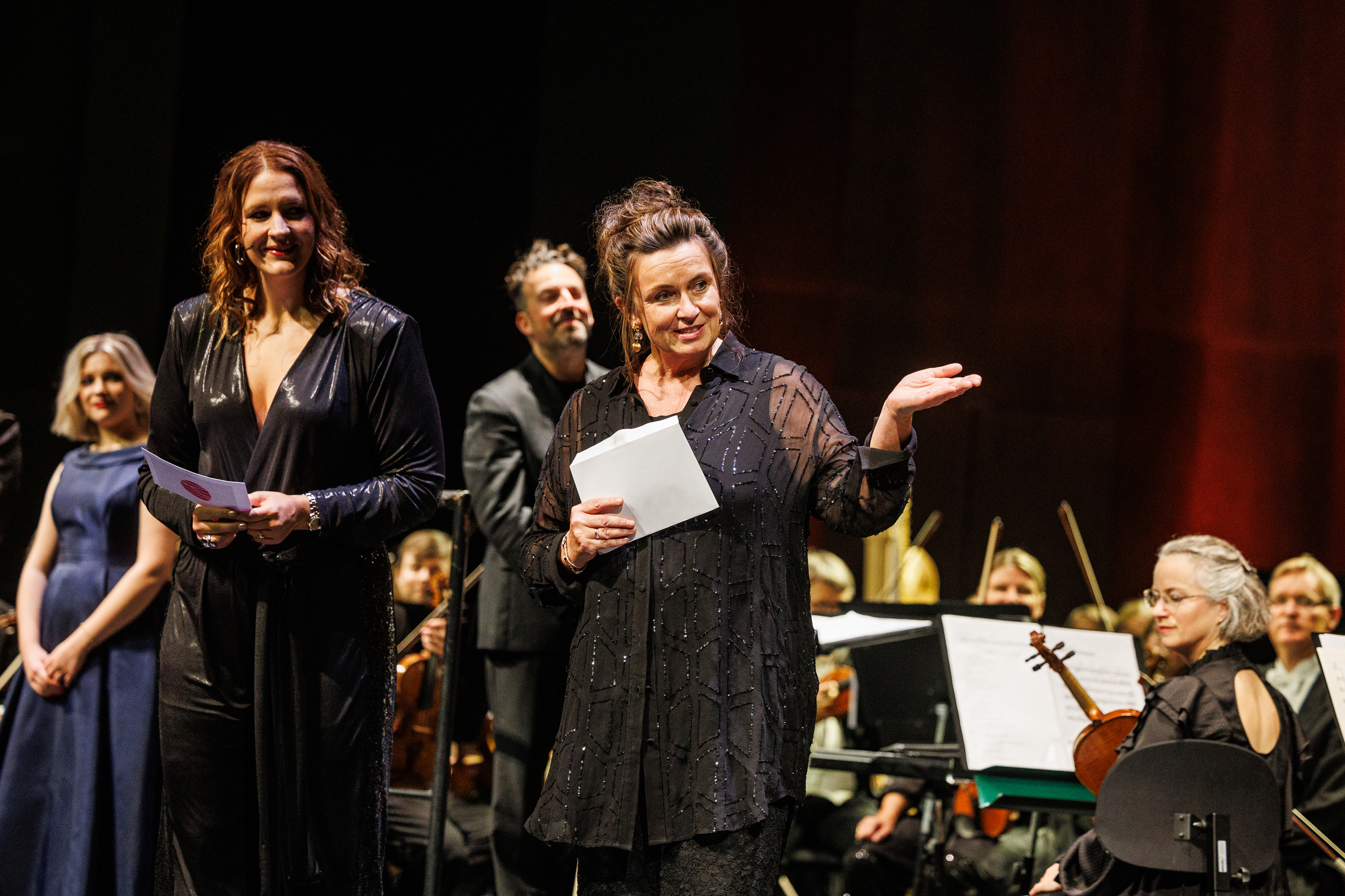
Director of Opera, Randi Stene was Chair of the jury in the 2023 and 2025 Competition. Here from the final concert in 2023 with presenter Lise Davidsen (soprano, First Prize winner 2015). Photo: Per Ole Hagen/QSSC

The jury of the Queen Sonja Singing Competition consists of leading figures in the opera world. The jury usually has seven members and includes both professional opera singers and opera directors from around the world. After the preliminary rounds each jury member votes for 12 contestants to proceed to the semi-final. After the semi-final the jury members vote for six candidates who proceed to the final. After the final each jury member ranks the finalists from 1 to 6. The finalist with the lowest number is the competition's 1st prize winner. Each jury member submits his or her votes in writing, without revealing them to the other jury members. The jury's verdict is final.

=== Jury 2025 ===
- Randi Stene, Norway, Director of Opera, Norwegian National Opera & Ballet, Oslo (chair)
- Jean Denes, France, Director of Opera, Theater Basel
- Tatjana Kandel, Denmark, Head of Artistic Planning, Danish National Symphony Orchestra
- Michael Heaston, USA, Deputy General Manager, Metropolitan Opera, New York
- Christina Scheppelmann, Germany, CEO and Artistic Director, La Monnaie/De Munt, Brussels
- Alex Taylor, UK, Head of Artistic Planning, the Oslo Philharmonic
- Carolin Wielpütz, Germany, Director of Artistic Planning, MusikTheater an der Wien

== Prize Winners 2025 ==
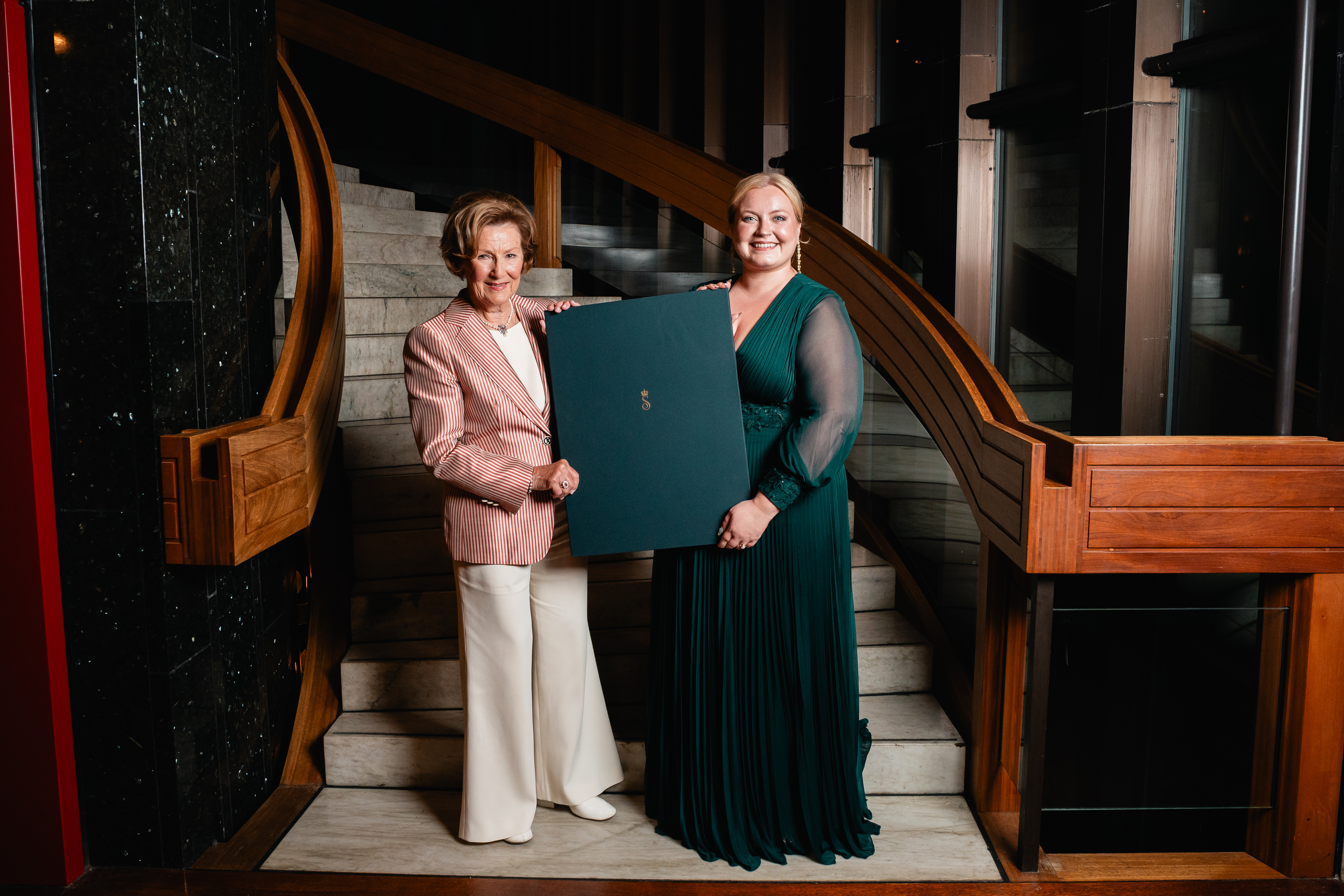
HM Queen Sonja with 2025 First Prize winner Kathleen O'Mara (soprano, USA). Photo: John-Halvdan Olsen-Halvorsen/QSSC

First Prize: Kathleen O'Mara (soprano, USA)

Second Prize: Meridian Prall (mezzo-soprano, USA)

Third Prize: Paweł Horodyski (bass, Poland)

Lied Prize: Paweł Horodyski (bass, Poland)

Ingrid Bjoner Scholarship for best Norwegian participant: Hannah Edmunds (soprano, Norway)

Finalist Prizes: Vladyslav Buialskyi (bass-baritone, Ukraine), Hannah Edmunds (soprano, Norway) and Justyna Khil (soprano, Poland)

== Sources ==
1. Home (qssc.no)
2. Queen Sonja Singing Competition on Facebook
3. @queen_sonja_competition on Instagram
4. Queen Sonja Singing Competition on YouTube
