= Knut Aalefjær =

Norwegian jazz musician and composer (born 1954)

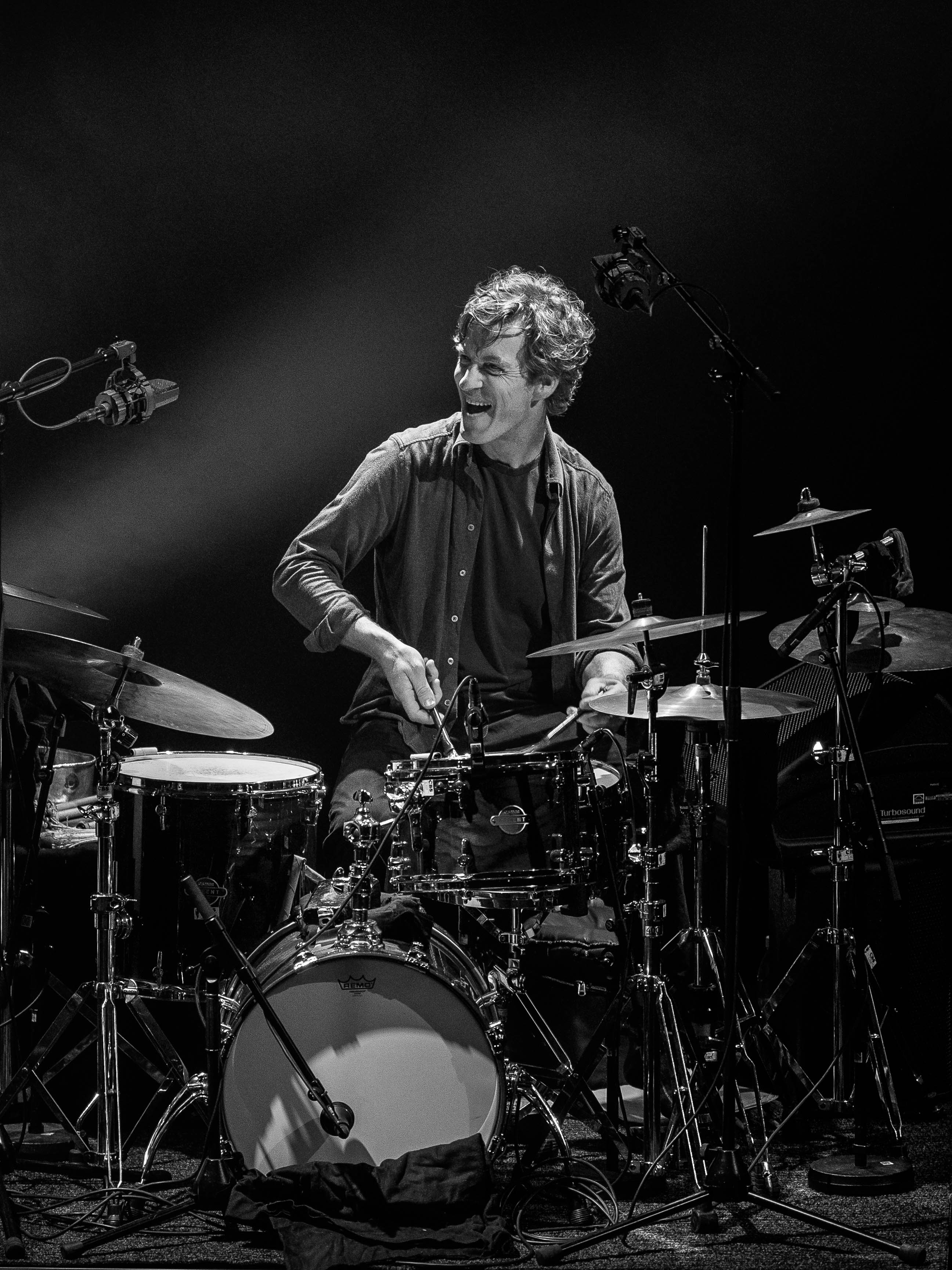
- Aalefjær on stage in 2024; Photo: Birgit Fostervold

Background information
- Born: 21 December 1974 (age 51); Bærum
- Origin: Norway
- Genres: Jazz
- Occupations: Musician, composer
- Instrument: Drums

Knut Aalefjær (born 21 December 1974 in Bærum) is a Norwegian jazz musician (drums and percussion), and composer, educated at the Norwegian Academy of Music. He is known as an eminent drummer who provide significant contributions in the Helge Lien Trio, the band Geir Lysne Listening Ensemble, with the vocalist Live Maria Roggen, the band of Kristin Asbjørnsen (known from Dadafon, Krøyt, and Nymark Collective), and many others.

== Career ==
During his studies at Norwegian Academy of Music he and fellow students Lars Andreas Haug (tuba) and Vidar Saether (saxophone?, established the band Moment's Notice with a release in 2003. He was also a member of orchestras Musikkflekken Workshop Big Band and ImproVice Versa, and on releases with the Geir Lysnes Listening Ensemble, as well as in pianist Helge Lien's Trio with Frode Berg (bass), on six recordings. With Great Curves, he also released the recording Rotoscope (2001), were the band members are Christine Sandtorv (vocal), Rune Brøndbo (keyboards), Lars Horntveth (saxophon), Anders Mjøs (keyboards), and Rob Waring (percussion).

Aalefjær is a commonly used musician in Oslo's musical life. With Elin Rosseland he has played on the record (Moment, 2004), in addition (in a trio with Staffan Svensson trumpet) performed composition of Eyvind Skeie and Geir Lysne for dissolution of the union (with Sweden) Grenseløse Gud in collaboration with Forsvarets musikk, Oslo Chorale Selskap and Den norske kirke (2005). He has also played with Det Norske Blåseensemble at the Big Band Festival 2004.

Aalefjær has also been involved in studio album Blood Inside to the Norwegian band Ulver in 2005.

From 2010 he joined the trio with Ruth Wilhelmine Meyer (vocals), and Elfi Sverdrup (vocals) and Lars Andreas Haug (tuba), and the band became a quartet. They released the album Akku 5 (2011).

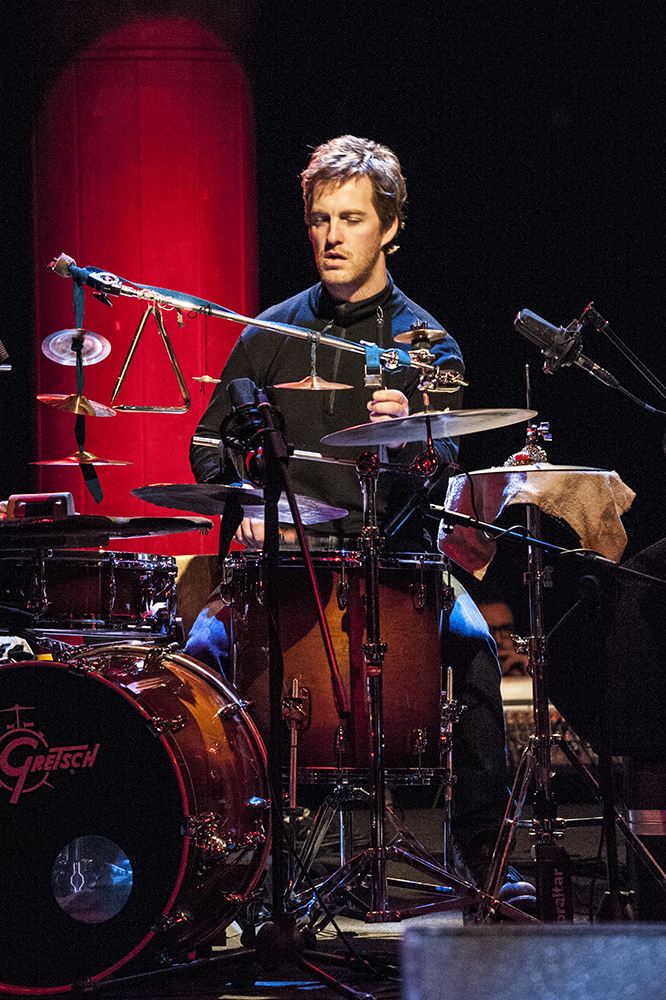
Norwegian musical project AKKU 5 performing at the OCH-Teatr in Warsaw, Poland - December 2011.

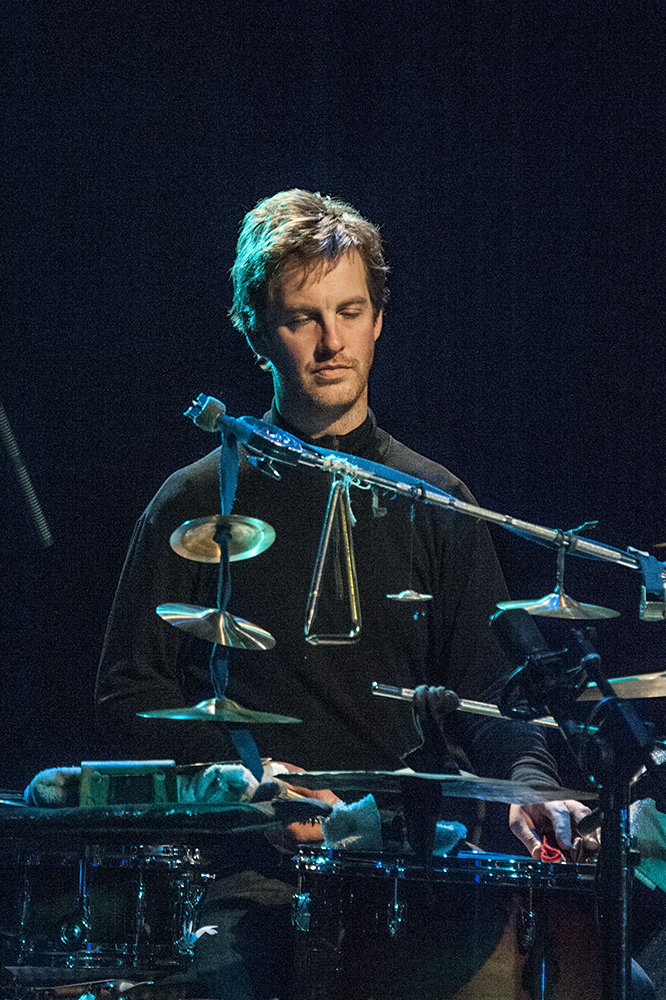
AKKU 5 in Warsaw, Poland - December 2011.

== Discography ==
In the main lineup

- 2002: Spiral Circle (DIW Japan), with Helge Lien Trio
- 2003: Asymmetrics (DIW Japan) with Helge Lien Trio
- 2003/2004): Moment's Notice (Mnemosyne Productions/Sonor Rec.) (Elektronika/Rock) (4 versions)
- 2005: Helge Lien Trio – Live (Curling Legs)
- 2006: To The Little Radio (DIW) with Helge Lien Trio
- 2008: My Letter to the World – Words By Emily Dickinson (Nordic) with Hanne Tveter
- 2009: The Night Shines Like The Day (EmArcy/Universal), with Kristin Asbjørnsen
- 2011: Min Song Og Hjarteskatt (Kirkelig Kulturverksted) with Beate S. Lech
- 2011: Akku 5 (NorCD) as drummer in a quartet with Ruth Wilhelmine Meyer
- 2013: I'll Meet You in the Morning (EmArcy/Universal) with Kristin Asbjørnsen

As sidemann

- 2001: Rotoscope – Great Curves (Jester Records) with Andreas Mjøs, here as well as a composer
- 2002: Aurora Borealis – Nordic Lights (Suite For Jazz Orchestra) (ACT), with Geir Lysne
- 2002: Objects of Desire (Albedo) with Oslo Sinfonietta conducted by Christian Eggen
- 2002: Iter.Viator. (Jester Records), with Star of Ash
- 2003: Korall (ACT), with Geir Lysne Listening Ensemble (guest: Sondre Bratland)
- 2003: Moment (NorCD) with Elin Rosseland Vuggi
- 2004: Lost in Reverie (Mnemosyne Productions), with Peccatum
- 2005: Blood Inside (Jester Records) with Ulver (Elektronica/Rock)
- 2006: Boahjenásti – The North Star (ACT), with Geir Lysne Listening Ensemble
- 2007: Circuit Songs (Jazzland Recordings) with Live Maria Roggen
- 2008: The Thread (Candlelight Records USA), with Starofash
