= John Magnar Bernes =

- Also known as: Hungry John
- Born: 10 May 1951 (age 73); Bergen, Norway
- Origin: Norwegian
- Genres: Blues
- Occupation(s): Musician, composer
- Instrument(s): Harmonica and vocals
- Labels: Harvest Records; EMI; Hungry Records
- Website: www.hungryjohn.com

John Magnar Bernes, alias Hungry John, (born 10 May 1951) is a Norwegian musician (harmonica and vocals).

== Biography ==
Bernes was born in Bergen, Norway, and is best known as a member and founder of the blues band Bergen Blues Band (1974–84), performing at the Nattjazz in 1975. There after he formed the band 'Hungry John and the Blue Shadows', which is still going strong. In 2009 he reunited Bergen Blues Band and released a new album with a compilation of their best songs.

Sometime in the 1960s came Bernes started listening to some blue albums. He started playing the harmonica while listening to records of Muddy Waters, Sonny Boy Williamson, Little Walter, Sonny Terry, Paul Butterfield, John Mayall among others. His greatest inspiration was, and still is, Muddy Waters, and in 1966 he initiated his first band 'Green Onions', playing blues and soul music.

In 1968 Bernes was part of initiating the "Alfonso Band". Blues was now getting more accepted as dance and concert music. They gave many gigs with different line-ups. From 1970 Bernes lived in London for long periods. He worked as a street musician and was also in many festivals and clubs. He listened to most of the live bands in England at the time, and was himself "vagabonding" with his music and harmonica, and got his nickname "Hungry John".

In 1975 Bernes started the Bergen Blues Band together with Per Jørgensen (gitar), Edvard Askeland (bass), Kåre Sandvik (piano) and Frank Jakobsen (drums). Willy Korneliussen replaced Jakobsen as drummer the year after. Bernes also played bass in the Alfonso Band, but when Edvard Askeland, the best bass player in Bergen at the time, joined them he got rid of the bass and concentrated on the harmonica and vocals. The rest of the band was also known as "the best" in Bergen on their instruments, which gave the band a flying start. One of the strengths was that they presented their own written material by Bernes, who has written more than hundred tunes. The band released three albums, Bergen Blues Band (1980), Another Blues (1981) and Blues Hit Me (1983). When they released the first album, it got right on the charts. At the time there was something called the top in Europe, and the band reached a fifth place there. Perhaps the best song, "Jump 'n Shout' n Dance", was number one in Ireland. The three albums sold a total of over 60, 000 copies. BBB toured Scandinavia. The songs were played on radio in the USA and Australia.

Bernes started 'Hungry John and The Blue Shadows' in 1985, and in 2000 he initiated a long lasting collaboration with Mads Eriksen resulting in the album Travelin (2007) and Just What The World Needs (2010).

== Honors ==
- 2003: Bluesprisen, The Norwegian Blues Award, at Notodden Blues Festival

== Discography ==
=== Solo albums ===
- 2000: It's All Right (Hungry Records)
- 2003: So Fine (Hungry Records)
- 2008: Bad Men Risin (Hungry Records)
- 2012: Have You Heard (Hungry Records)
- 2018: Hungry John Live (Bluestown Records)

=== Collaborations ===
With Bjørn Eidsvåg

- 1978: Bakerste Benk (Kirkelig Kulturverksted)
- 1985: Bjørn's Beste (Kirkelig Kulturverksted)

With Helge Nilsen and Rune Larsen

- 1979: Barn Av Samme Jord (Bergens Tidende)
- 1981: Sweet Mints (Snowflake Records)

With Bergen Blues Band

- 1980: Bergen Blues Band (Harvest Records)
- 1982: Another Blues (EMI/Harvest Records)
- 1983: Blues Hit Me (EMI)
- 2009: ``The Best of Bergen Blues Band`` (Hungry Records)

With Hungry John and the Blue Shadows

- 1986: Nice Guys (Famous Records)
- 1989: Hungry John and the Blue Shadows Live (Hungry Records)
- 1991: Hungry John and the Blue Shadows (EMI)

With Mad & Hungry

- 2007: Travelin' (Hungry Records)
- 2010: Just What The World Needs (Hungry Records)
