= Torgrim Sollid =

Norwegian musician (born 1942)

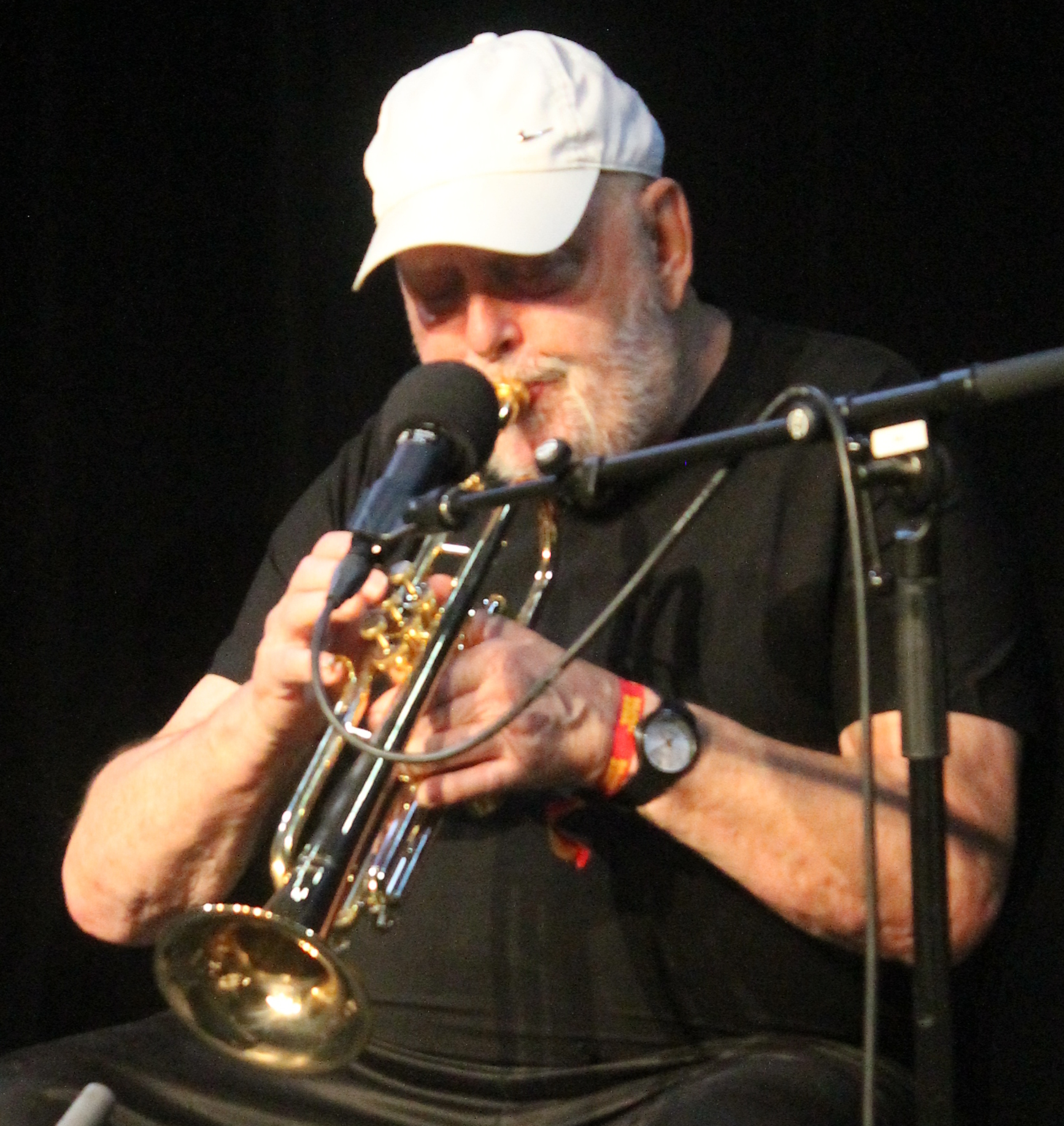
- Sollid in 2023

Background information
- Born: 17 June 1942 (age 84); Eidskog, Norway
- Genres: Jazz, traditional folk
- Occupations: Musician and composer
- Instruments: Trumpet, flugelhorn, drums
- Labels: Hot Club, Curling Legs, NorCD

Torgrim Sollid (born 17 June 1942) is a Norwegian self-taught traditional folk musician, composer and jazz musician (trumpet, flugelhorn, and drums), known for combining folk music with jazz, and for playing in the Jan Garbarek Quartet and Warne Marsh Sextet.

== Career ==
After growing up in Stor-Elvdal Municipality Sollid was drummer in "Veitvet Big Band" and "Jan Garbarek Quartet" (1962–63), prior to training in music therapy in Mo i Rana, where he also played with Guttorm Guttormsen Band. In Molde he played in Erling Aksdal Sextet, and the two then gave out the "mountain jazz" project Østerdalsmusikk (1974) with music by Ole Mørk Sandvik. In the same vein he started the big band Søyr (1976–) in Trondheim, which he has led since to a number of album releases. Sollid played on two albums Sax of a kind (1983) and For the Time Being (1987) by Warne Marsh, with Sidsel Endresen and others in "Blue Moon" he performed at the "Oslo Jazzfestival" in 1995, and participated on the Thomas Winther Andersen album Line Up (1998).

He has been associated with the jazz program at Trondheim Musikkonservatorium and has taught jazz trumpet at Norges Musikkhøgskole, where he began Norway's other jazz education, in addition to the jazz program in Trondheim. With Knut Værnes he led the summer school for Norsk jazzforum.

== Awards and honors ==
- Norwegian champion in amateur jazz 1962 with Jan Garbarek Quartet, awarded third soloist prize

== Discography ==
=== Solo ===
- 1974: Østerdalsmusikk (MAI)

=== Collaborations ===
Within Søyr

- 1977: Søyr (MAI)
- 1983: Cierny Peter (Odin)
- 1987: Vectors (Hot Club)
- 1994: Bussene lengter hjem (Curling Legs)
- 1997: Med kjøtt og kjærlighet (Curling Legs) with the poetry of Niels Fredrik Dahl and Torgeir Rebolledo Pedersen
- 2001: Alene hjemme (Curling Legs)

Within Warne Marsh Sextet

- 1983: Sax of a Kind (Hot Club) with John Pål Inderberg, Terje Bjørklund, Bjørn Kjellemyr, Carl Haakon Waadeland
- 1987: For the Time Being (Hot Club) with John Pål Inderberg, Erling Aksdal, Bjørn Alterhaug, Ole Jacob Hansen

With Thomas Winther Andersen Line Up

- 1998: Line Up (NorCD)
- 2004: Out from a Cool Storage (NorCD)

With MESON

- 2022: MESON (Live in Studio) (Roselyd) with Ingeborg Gravem Sollid, Elin Rosseland, Andreas Wildhagen, Thor Bjøn Neby

Crazy Moon

- 2017: West Side Story (Curling Legs)
