= Mykytenko =

Mykytenko or Mikitenko (Ukrainian: Микитенко) is a Ukrainian surname. Notable people with the surname include:

- Irina Mikitenko (born 1972), German long-distance runner
- Leonid Mykytenko (1944–2019), Ukrainian long-distance runner
- Olga Mykytenko (born 1974), Ukrainian-German opera singer
