= Kristin Asbjørnsen =

Norwegian jazz singer and composer

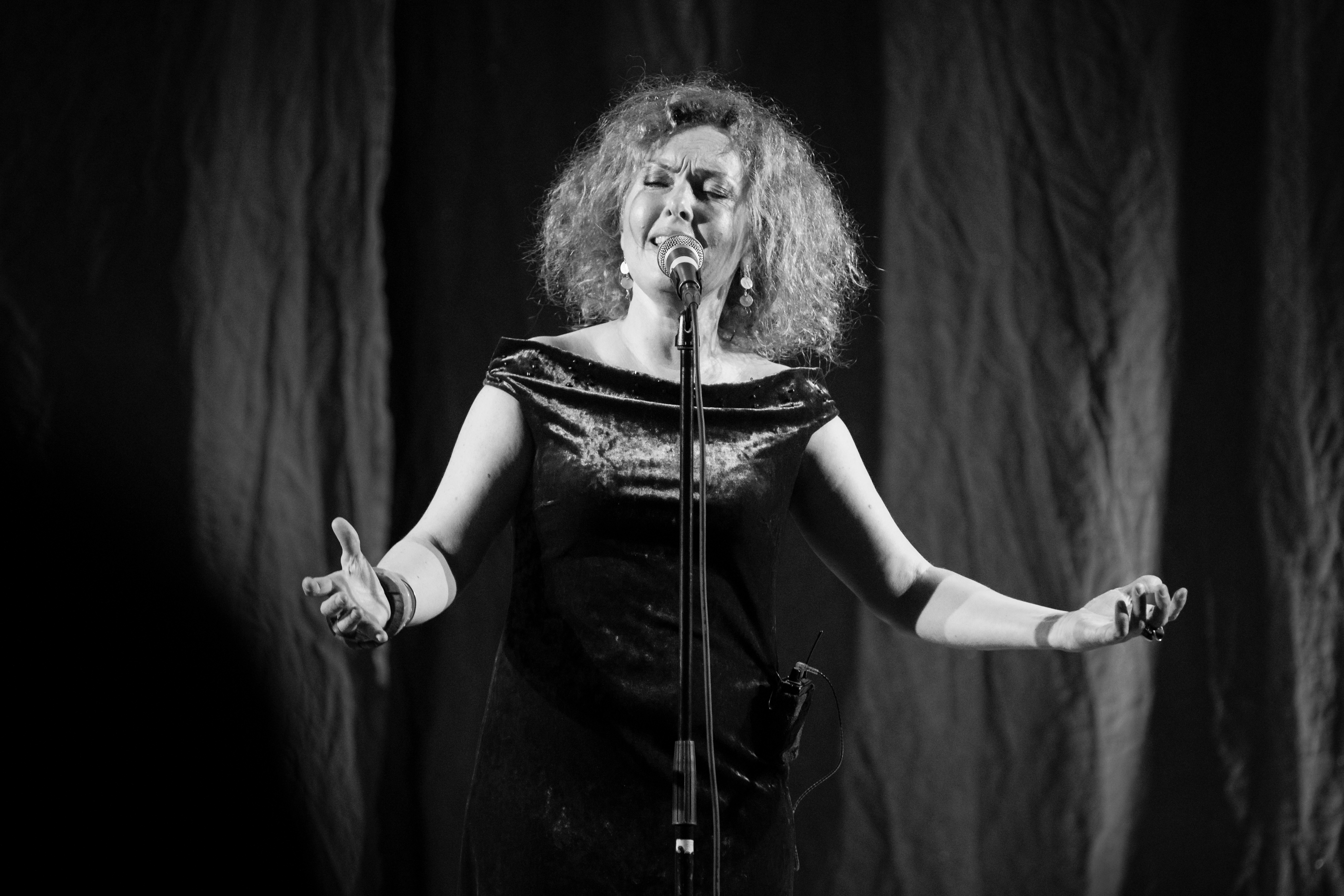
- Kristin Asbjørnsen performing at the 2019 Jazz på Jølst festival

Background information
- Born: 12 May 1971 (age 55); Lillehammer, Norway
- Origin: Norway
- Genres: Jazz
- Occupations: Musician, composer, band leader
- Instrument: Vocals
- Formerly of: Dadafon, Krøyt
- Website: Official website

Kristin Asbjørnsen (born 12 May 1971) is a Norwegian jazz singer and composer whose focus is on improvised music. She is known for musical projects like Dadafon including with Carl Haakon Waadeland, Krøyt, Kvitretten, and Nymark Collective among others.

== Career ==
Asbjørnsen was born in Lillehammer and educated at the Jazz Program at the Trondheim Conservatory of Music, Norwegian Academy of Music and the University of Oslo, Her style has its roots in the singer-songwriter tradition and includes elements from African music, World music, spirituals and jazz.

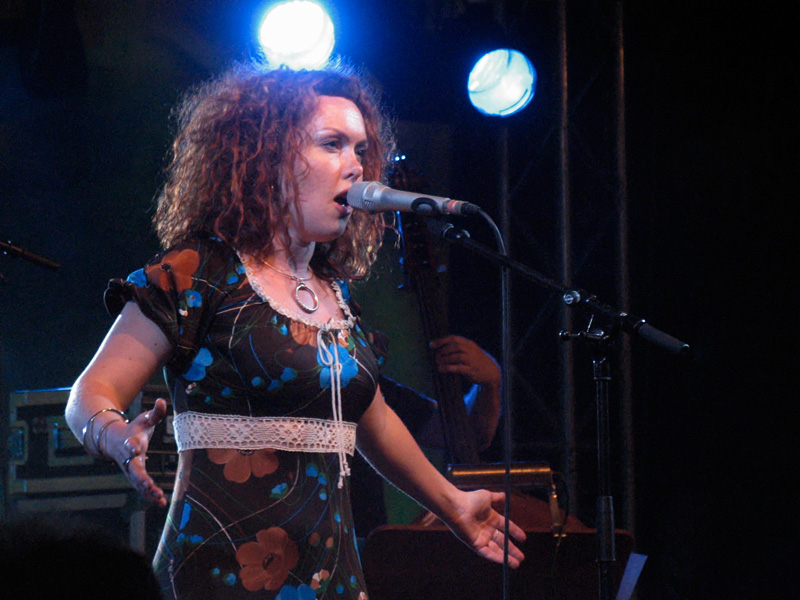
Kristin Asbjørnsen

Wayfaring Stranger – A Spiritual Songbook (2006) was her first solo album, based on African-American spirituals, and the note sheets she inherited from singer Ruth Reese, her former song teacher. The album, as well as an extended European tour, was met with outstanding reviews. The album has received a Platinum Disc and nomination for the Spellemannprisen (Norwegian Music Awards equiv. to Grammy).

A live recording, The Bessie Smith Songbook, sheds new light on the songs of legendary jazz and blues singer, sung with the quartet Nymark Collective. In 2005 Asbjørnsen, Tord Gustavsen and Knut Aalefjær were asked to perform together at Molde International Jazz Festival. Two years later the concept was continued with a Norwegian tour. The concerts at Cosmopolite in Oslo and at the Nattjazz Festival in Bergen in 2007 were recorded. The Bessie Smith Songbook includes many of the early jazz standards, such as "Nobody Knows You When You're Down and Out" and "Oh, Daddy Blues".

Asbjørnsen made her international debut as a film score composer for the film Factotum, based on the novel of the same name by Charles Bukowski. Asbjørnsen has featured on a number of album releases, as well as a series of tours and festival performances in Europe. In 2009 she won the Babel Med Mondomix Award.

She is a member of the bands Dadafon and Krøyt, and was also in the Kvitretten, who split in 2001. In 2000 she received the Gammleng-prisen in the class jazz. For the album The Night Shines Like the Day she received the Spellemannprisen 2009 in open class. Asbjørnsen together with the world-renowned a cappella group Ladysmith Black Mambazo holding concerts in seven different townships in South Africa Back to eKasi, organized by, among others, Rikskonsertene.

== Honors ==
- Spellemannprisen 1999 with Krøyt in open class for the album Low
- Gammleng-prisen 2000 in the class jazz
- Edvard Prize 2000 for the composition Silent from the EP Body Electric
- Konon Prize 2006 for best film music
- Spellemannprisen 2009 in open class for the album The Night Shines Like the Day
- Babel Med Mondomix Award 2009

== Discography ==
=== Solo albums ===
Year	Title	Label	Chart positions	Certifications
Year	Title	Label	NOR	Certifications
2005	Factotum	Milan	—	
2006	Wayfaring Stranger – A Spiritual Songbook	Universal Music	3	
2009	The Night Shines Like the Day	Universal Music	5	
2013	I'll Meet You in the Morning	Universal Music	14	

=== Collaborations ===
Within Dadafon

- 1998: Coloured Moods (Rim Records)
- 2002: And I Can't Stand Still (Rim Records)
- 2002: Release Me (Via Music)
- 2002: Visitor (Via Music)
- 2004: Harbour (Universal Music/EmArcy Records)
- 2005: Lost Love Chords (Milan)

Within Krøyt

- 1997: Sub (Curling Legs)
- 1999: Low (Bergland Productions)
- 2001: Body Electric EP (Music Network Records)
- 2001: One Heart Is Too Small (Yonada Records)

Within Kvitretten

- 1996: Voices (Curling Legs)
- 1999: Everything Turns (Curling Legs)
- 2002: Kloden Er En Snurrebass Som Snurrer Oss (Curling Legs)

With other projects

- 2001: Smak Av Himmel, Spor Av Jord (Grappa Music), with various artists
- 2004: Seafarer's Song (EmArcy Records), with Ketil Bjørnstad
- 2008: Bessie Smith Revisited Live in Concert (Nymark Collective Records), with Nymark Collective
- 2009: Restored, Returned (ECM Records), within Tord Gustavsen Ensemble

Awards
Preceded by Bugge Wesseltoft	Recipient of the Jazz Gammleng-prisen; 2000	Succeeded by Knut Værnes
Preceded by Farmers Market	Recipient of the Open class Spellemannprisen; 2009	Succeeded by Jaga Jazzist
