= Adam Bałdych =

Polish jazz violinist and composer

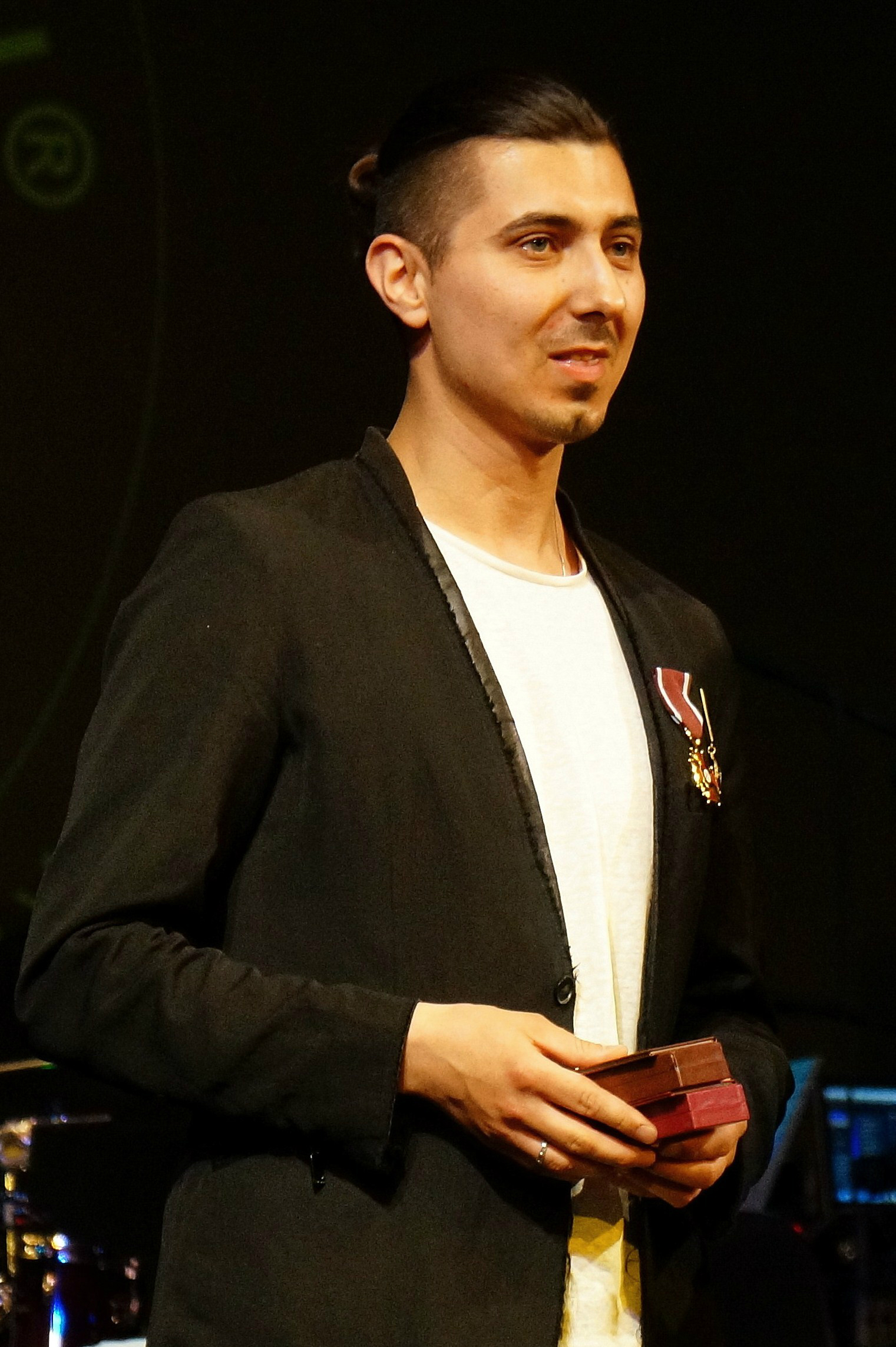

Background information
- Also known as: Evil
- Born: 18 May 1986 (age 39); Gorzów Wielkopolski
- Origin: Poland
- Genres: Jazz
- Occupations: Musician, composer
- Years active: 1999–present
- Labels: ATC, ACT Music
- Website: Official website

Adam Bałdych (born 18 May 1986 in Gorzów Wielkopolski, Poland) is a Polish violinist, composer, and music producer. Baldych is an ACT MUSIC (Germany) recording artist. He is known from a series of record releases and collaborations with musicians like Marius Neset, Morten Lund, and Lars Danielsson.

== Career ==
Bałdych picked up the violin at the age of 9 years and started at a music school in Gorzow Wielkopolski under guidance of Grazyna Wasilewska. He is a graduate of the Institute of Jazz and Popular Music at Karol Szymanowski Academy of Music and got a scholarship to continue at Berklee College of Music in Boston. At the age of 16 he had already achieved great recognition, and was called a "prodigy" in Poland. He started touring with prominent Polish and American musicians in Poland, Germany, Serbia, England, Finland, Hungary, Spain, France, Indonesia and the US.

His album Imaginary Room (2012), including musicians like Lars Danielsson, Jacob Karlzon, Verneri Pohjola, Morten Lund and Marius Neset, have opened the most important music scenes for Bałdych, and he was invited to the biggest jazz festivals in Europe like the Montreux Jazz Festival in Switzerland and the London Jazz Festival. Board draws the attention of many critics. Bałdych won the title Fiddler and Hope by Jazz Forum, the Top European jazz magazine in 2012, 2013 and 2014; was awarded the Record of the Year by Jazzarium.pl., and was the first ever Polish musician to get the ECHO Jazz Award in 2013, by the German music industry.

His second album for ACT The New Tradition was recorded together with Israeli pianist Yaron Herman and released on 30 May 2014. Recently ACT released Jazz at Berlin Philharmonic IV – Accordion Night which is a recording from the concert within the Jazz at Berlin Philharmonic series. 28 August 2015 his third album for ACT will be released – Adam Bałdych & Helge Lien Trio Bridges.

Adam was also nominated for the FRYDERYK Prize in 2013 and 2015 as an Artist of The Year in Jazz. Adam Bałdych received for the album The New Tradition, the award for Best Jazz Album 2014. This award is granted every year within the Gala Grand Prix Jazz Melomani by TVP Programme 2 and Jazz Melomani Society.

== Honors ==
- 2013: ECHO Jazz Award "International Artist of the Year Other Instruments/Violin", for Imaginary Room

== Discography ==
=== Solo albums ===
- 2009: Storyboard (Adam Bałdych)
- 2009: Damage Control (Adam Bałdych)
- 2011: Magical Theatre (Adam Bałdych)
- 2012: Imaginary Room (ACT)
- 2014: The New Tradition (ACT), with Yaron Herman
- 2015: Bridges (ACT), with Helge Lien Trio
- 2017: Brothers (ACT), with Helge Lien Trio & Tore Brunborg
- 2019: Sacrum Profanum (ACT), with Adam Baldych Quartet
- 2020: Clouds (ACT), with Vincent Courtois and Rogier Telderman
- 2021: Poetry (ACT), with Paolo Fresu
- 2023: Passacaglia (Imaginary Music), with Leszek Możdżer

=== Collaborations ===
- 2009: Balboo, with Piotr Żaczek
- 2009; A Tribute to Seifert, with Jarosław Śmietana
- 2012: My History of Jazz (ACT), with Iiro Rantala
- 2014: Anyone with a Heart (ACT), with Iiro Rantala

== Gallery ==
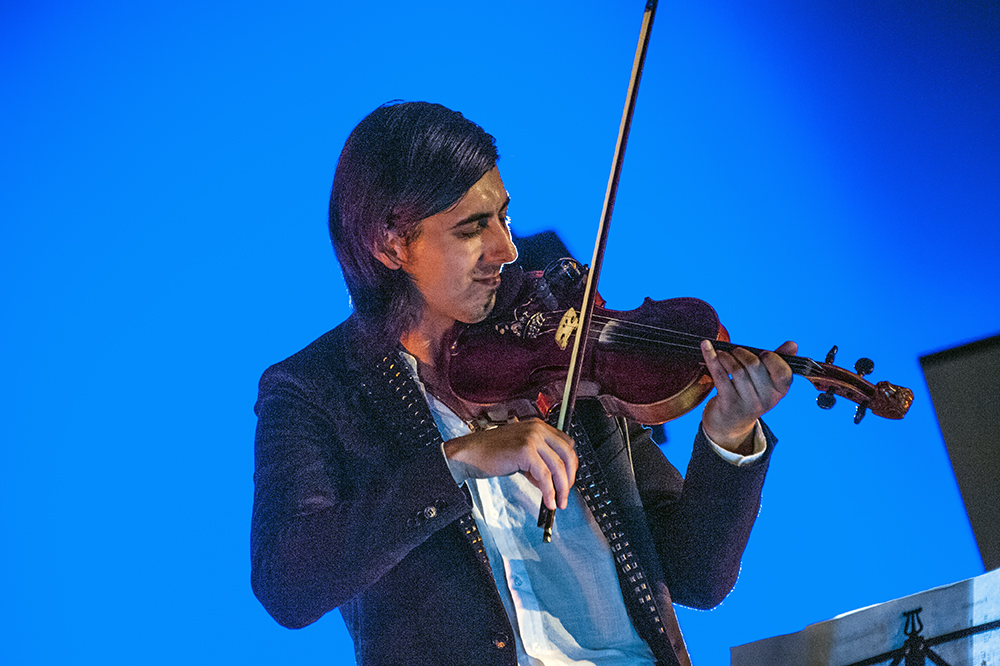
Fre3JazzDays Festival - Warsaw, Poland - August 2012.

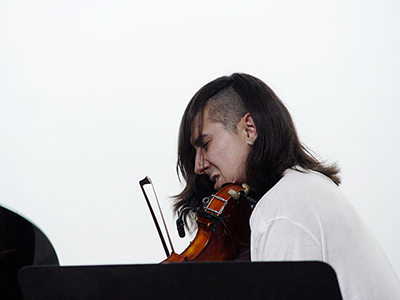
Adam Bałdych playing duo concert
with Aaron Parks in Aarhus 2014.

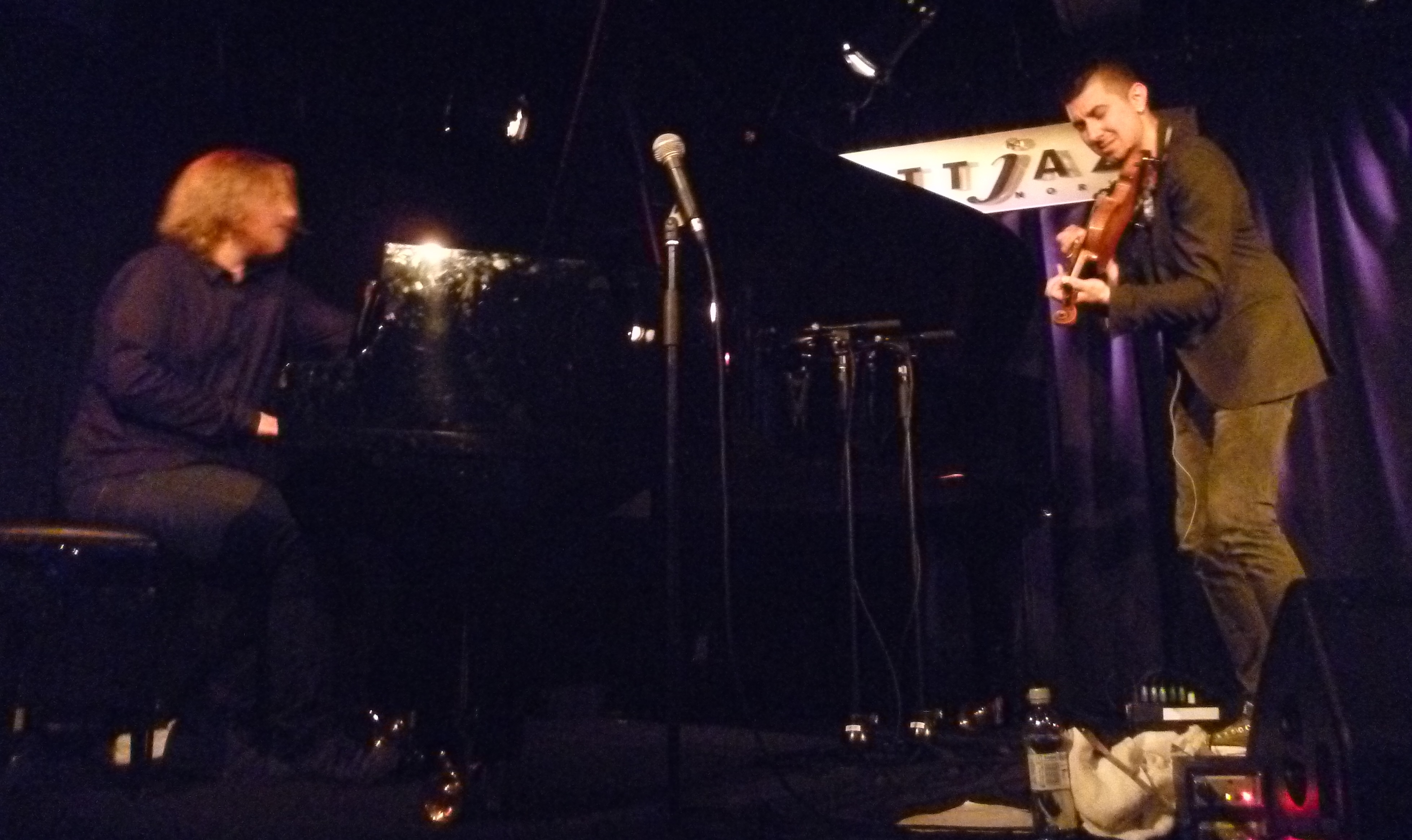
Baldych with Helge Lien Trio
at the 2016 Nattjazz in Bergen.
