= Helge Lien =

Norwegian jazz pianist, composer and band leader (born 1975)

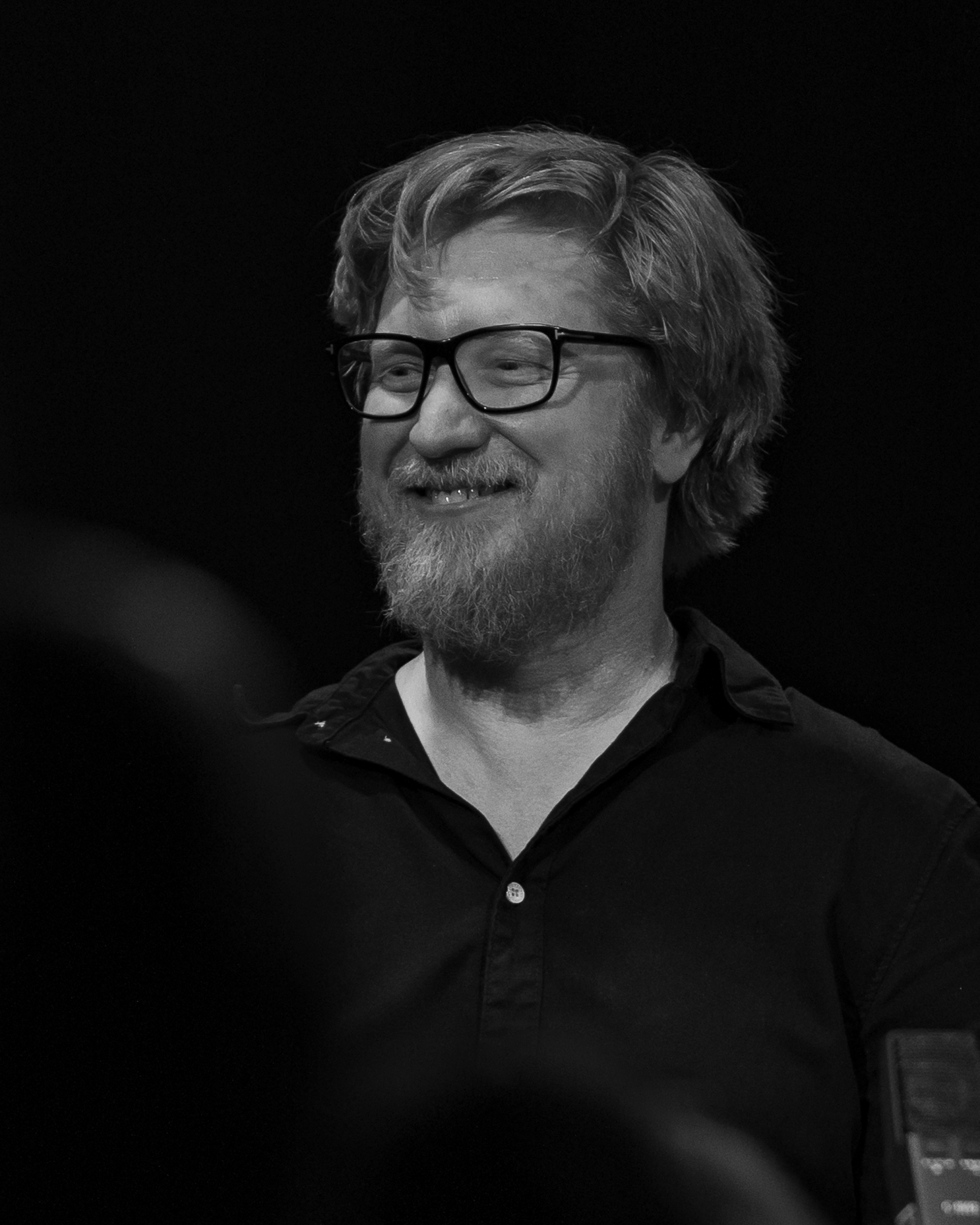
- Lien in 2025.

Background information
- Born: 23 April 1975 (age 51); Moelv, Ringsaker, Norway
- Genre: Jazz
- Occupations: Musician, composer
- Instrument: Piano
- Labels: Ozella Music; Curling Legs; DIW; Jazzaway
- Website: helgelien.com

Helge Lien (born 23 April 1975) is a Norwegian jazz pianist, composer and band leader. He has in recent years also developed a passion for photography and digital processing of images and has passion for powerful melancholy, dynamics and detail.

== Education ==
Lien attended Stange High School in Stange Municipality in 1991 and earned his Examen artium in 1994, before taking up musical studies at Norwegian Academy of Music in Oslo. He got a Cand.mag. degree fin 1998 under guidance of Mikhail Alperin, known as pianist of the Moscow Art Trio and from solo performances and recordings, and did postgraduate studies with the group Tri O'Trang culminating with cand.musicae exam in 2001.

== Career ==
Lien is known from a variety of musical contexts, such as Tri O'Trang (with Torben Snekkestad on sax and Lars Andreas Haug on tuba), Helge Lien Trio, the duo Hero with saxophonist Rolf-Erik Nystrom, and with the vocalists Live Maria Roggen and Silje Nergaard.

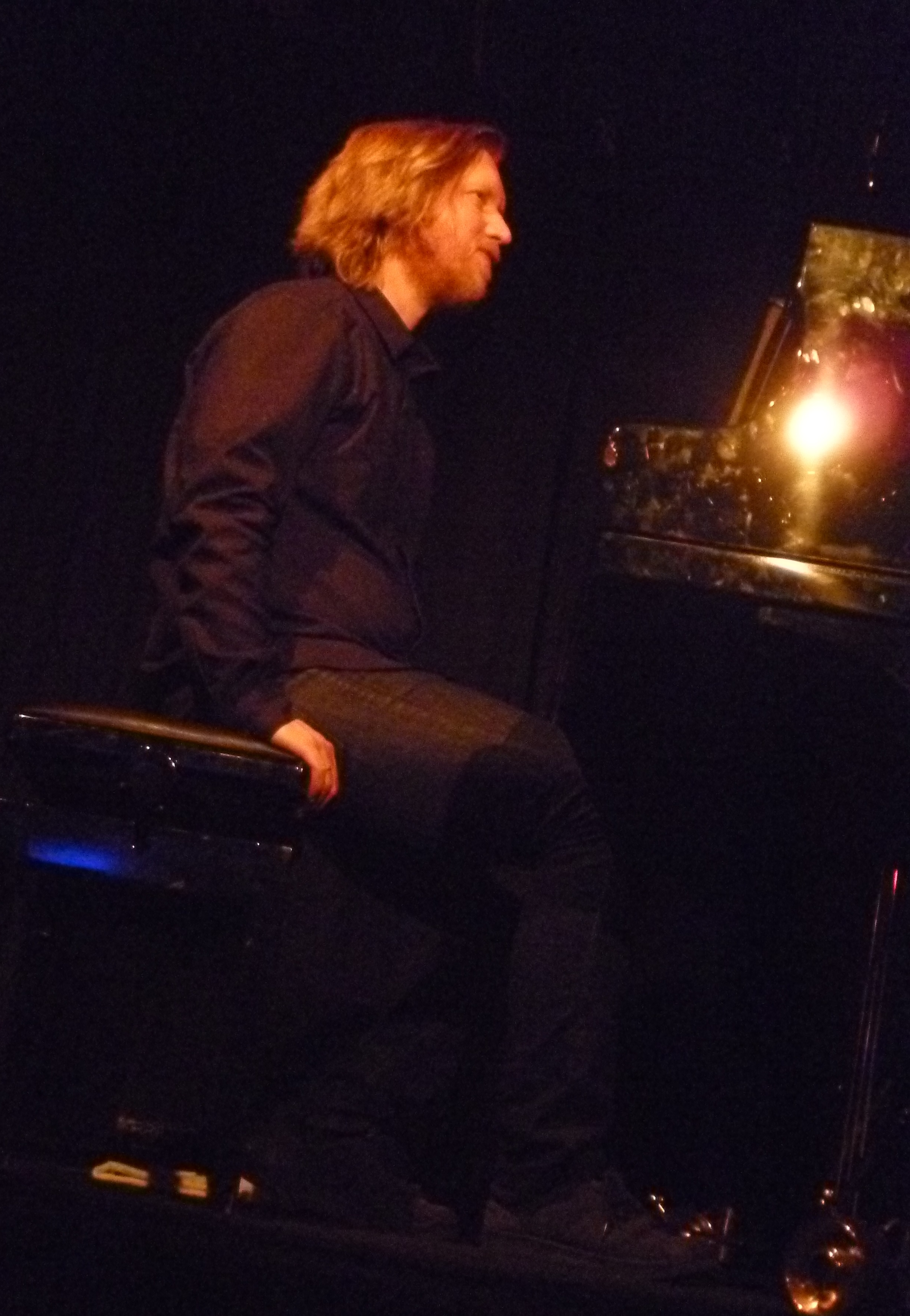
Lien at the 2016 Nattjazz.

Lien has written all the music on the latest Helge Lien Trio album Natsukashii. In this, there are lots of references to trios like Bill Evans, Keith Jarrett, and Brad Mehldau trio. Along with bassist Frode Berg and drummer Knut Aalefjær, who was substituted with Per Oddvar Johansen from 2013, Helge Lien Trio is also moving.

== Honors ==
- 2002: Norwegian Government Grants
- 2007: Nattjazzprisen
- 2008: Spellemannprisen in the class Jazz
- 2008: Kongsberg Jazz Award

== Discography ==
=== As leader/co-leader ===
Year recorded	Title	Label	Notes
2000	Talking to a Tree	Lydlauget ANS	Solo piano
2000	Liker	Nor-CD	As Tri O'Trang; trio, with Torben Snekkestad (sax), Lars Andreas Haug (tuba)
2001	What Are You Doing the Rest of Your Life	Curling Legs	Trio, with Frode Berg (bass), Knut Aalefjær (drums)
2002	Spiral Circle	DIW	Trio, with Frode Berg (bass), Knut Aalefjær (drums)
2002	Fordivi	Challenge	As Tri O'Trang; trio, with Torben Snekkestad (sax, bass clarinet), Lars Andreas Haug (tuba, trumpet)
2003	Asymmetrics	DIW	Trio, with Frode Berg (bass), Knut Aalefjær (drums)
2005	Live	Curling Legs	Trio, with Frode Berg (bass), Knut Aalefjær (drums); in concert
2005	Plays Jon Eberson	Curling Legs	As Tri O'Trang, quintet, with Torben Snekkestad (sax), Lars Andreas Haug (tuba), Jon Eberson (guitar), Per Oddvar Johansen (drums)
2005	Prøysen – musikken fra dokumentaren	Jazzavdelingen	As Hero; duo, with Rolf-Erik Nystrøm (sax)
2006	The Discovery & Exploration of Planet HERO	Jazzaway	As Hero; duo, with Rolf-Erik Nystrøm (sax)
2006	Må	Curling Legs	As Tri O'Trang; trio, with Torben Snekkestad (sax, bass clarinet), Lars Andreas Haug (tuba, valve trombone)
2006	To the Little Radio	DIW	Trio
2008	Hello Troll	Ozella	Trio, with Frode Berg (bass), Knut Aalefjær (drums); Spellemannprisen 2008
2010	Natsukashii	Ozella	Trio, with Frode Berg (bass), Knut Aalefjær (drums); released 2011
2011	Kattenslager	Ozella/Musikklosen	Solo piano
2012?	Memnon	Ozella	Duo, co-led with Ruth Wilhelmine Meyer (vocals)
2013	Badgers and Other Beings	Ozella	Trio, with Frode Berg (bass), Per Oddvar Johansen (drums)
2015	Bridges	ACT	Co-led with Adam Baldych (violin); quartet, with Frode Berg (bass), Per Oddvar Johansen (drums)
2016	Guzuguzu	Ozella	Trio, with Frode Berg (bass), Per Oddvar Johansen (drums)

=== Collaborations ===
With LiveLien

- 2011: Låvesalg (Jazzland/Universal)
- 2016: YOU (Ozella)

With Arild Andersen and Gard Nilssen

- 2016: The Rose Window (Deutsche Media Productions), live at Theater Gütersloh

Awards
Preceded by Kjetil Møster	Recipient of the Nattjazzprisen; 2007	Succeeded by No reward in 2008
Preceded by Petter Wettre	Recipient of the Jazz Spellemannprisen; 2008	Succeeded by Tord Gustavsen Ensemble
Preceded by Morten Qvenild	Recipient of the Kongsberg Jazz Award; 2008	Succeeded by Ole Morten Vågan
