= Krøyt =

- Origin: Trondheim, Norway
- Years active: 1993–present
- Label: Curling Legs

Krøyt (established 1993 in Trondheim, Norway) was a Norwegian jazz band, known from several album releases.

== Biography ==
Krøyt was an experimental musical adventure, exploring subtile elements of different musical landscapes. They can not be framed as «jazz», «rock» or «electronica», although you can find elements from all of these genres. They sprang out of the music scene on the Jazz program at Trondheim Musikkonservatorium (NTNU). They released their acclaimed debut album Sub in 1997, and the followup Low (1999) was met with excellent reviews, and it also won the Spellemannprisen in 1999 in the Open class. In a collaborative effort with the Swedish band Fläskkvartetten, they elaborated the commission for Moldejazz 2001. The EP album Body electrics (2001) include the song «Silent», awarded Edvard Prize 2000. For the «Vinterspillene» they composed «Frozen waterfall». Their latest release is the album One heart is too small (2001).

On behalf of «Nordisk Kulturfond» Krøyt toured 2000 in Köln, Bergen, New York City and Tampere, whereupon they entertained Norway on behalf of «Norsk jazzforum» (2001). The trio also made the performance While my heart beats still, in cooperation with Vertavo String Quartet (2003).

== Band members ==
- Kristin Asbjørnsen - vocals
- Øyvind Brandtsegg - keyboards & vibraphone
- Thomas T. Dahl - guitar

== Honors ==
- Spellemannprisen 1999 for the album Low
- Edvard Prize 2000 for the song «Silent»

== Discography ==
- 1997: Sub (Curling Legs)
- 1998: Low (BP)
- 2001: One Heart Is Too Small (Yonada)
- 2001: Body Electric EP (MNW)

Awards
Preceded by Sidsel Endresen & Bugge Wesseltoft	Recipient of the Open class Spellemannprisen; 1999	Succeeded by Nils Petter Molvær
