= Dadafon =

Norwegian musical group

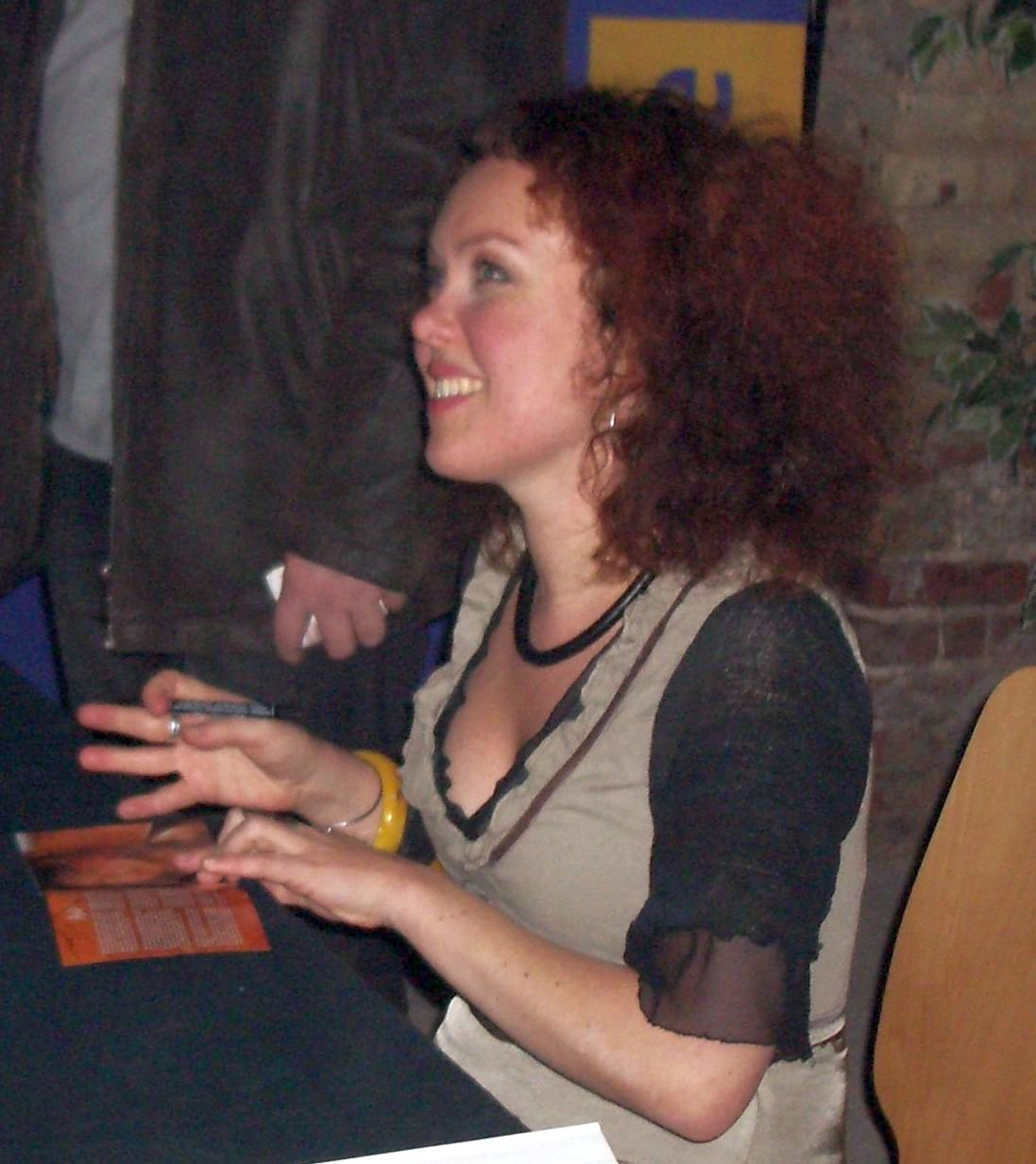
- Kristin Asbjørnsen (2008)

Background information
- Origin: Trondheim, Norway
- Genres: Electronica, jazz
- Years active: 1995–present
- Label: EmArcy Records
- Members: Kristin Asbjørnsen; Jostein Ansnes; Bjørn Ole Solberg; Eirik Øien; Martin Viktor Langlie
- Past members: Martin Smidt; Carl Haakon Waadeland; Kenneth Kapstad

Dadafon (established in 1995 in Trondheim, Norway) was a Norwegian experimental jazz band, originally called Coloured Moods (name changed in 2000), initiated by drummer Martin Smidt, and including Kristin Asbjørnsen (vocals), Carl Haakon Waadeland (drums), Jostein Ansnes and Bjørn Ole Solberg. The band had African music influences.

Lead singer Kristin Asbjørnsen brought an authority to their sound that many female rock singers may shy away from as she not only has the range to lead such a strong band of musicians, but also the vocal power to take their songs to new heights. They performed songs in Norwegian and English. Dadafon and Kristin Asbjønsen, performed most of the songs on the Factotum sound track, like slow day.

== Band members ==
=== Present members ===
- Kristin Asbjørnsen - vocals (1995- )
- Jostein Ansnes - guitar (1995- )
- Bjørn Ole Solberg - saxophone (1995- )
- Øyvind Engen - cello (2004- )
- Eirik Øien - bass (2002- )
- Martin Viktor Langlie - drums (2004- )

=== Past members ===
- Martin Smidt - drums, percussion & xylophone (1995–2002)
- Carl Haakon Waadeland - drums (1995–2002)
- Kenneth Kapstad - drums (2002–04)

== Discography ==
- 1998: Coloured Moods (Rim Records)
- 2001: And I Can't Stand Still (Rim Records)
- 2002: Visitor (Via Music)
- 2004: Harbour (Universal Spain)
- 2005: Lost Love Chords (EmArcy Records)
- 2006: Factotum (Milan), music for the film by Bent Hammer
