= Frode Berg =

Norwegian bassist (born 1971)

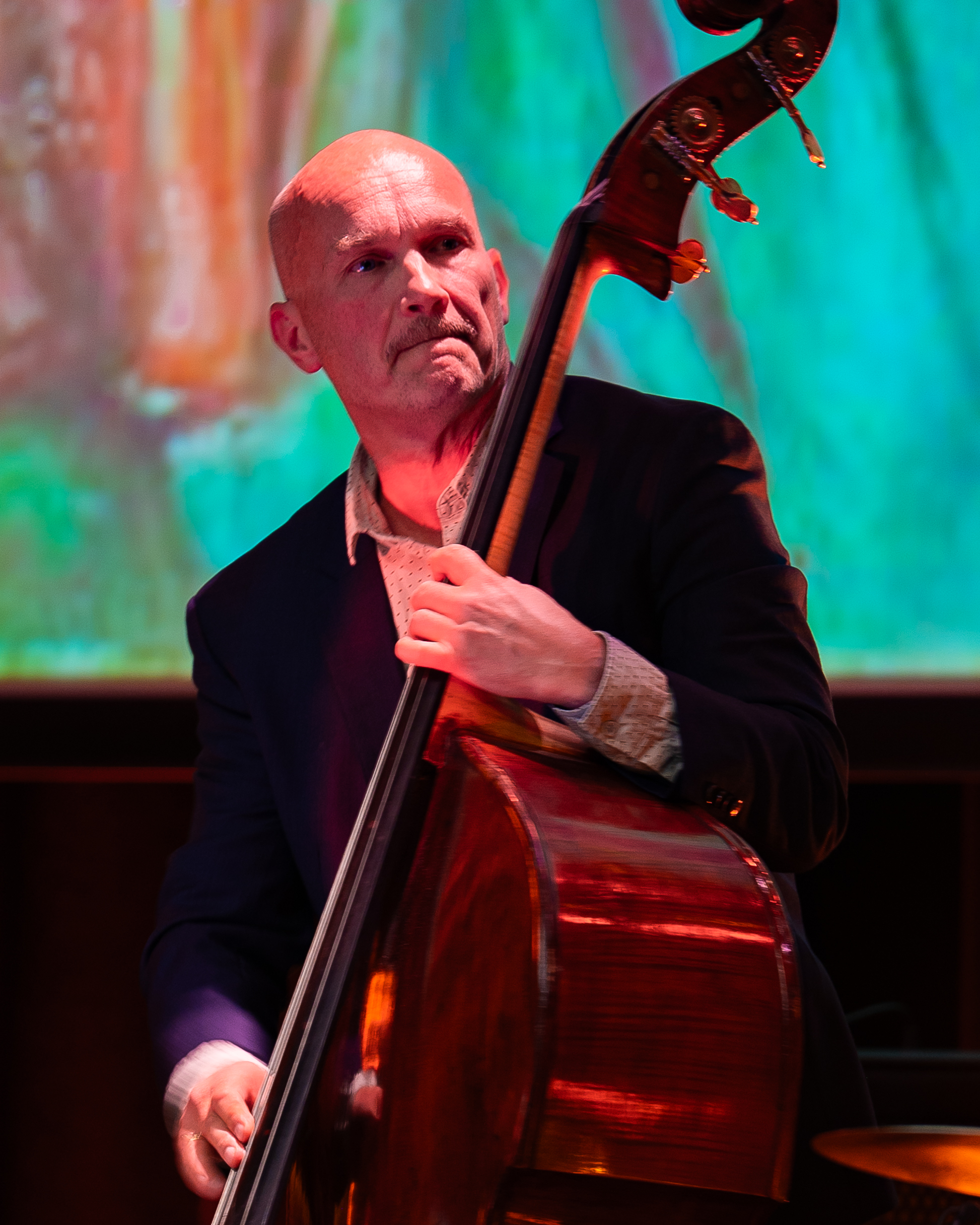
- Berg in 2025

Background information
- Born: 24 October 1971 (age 54)
- Origin: Oslo, Norway
- Genres: Jazz, electronica, pop
- Occupation: Musician
- Instruments: Double bass, cello, bass guitar
- Formerly of: Oslo-Filharmonien

Frode Berg (born 24 October 1971) is a Norwegian bassist known for his works in classical and contemporary music, jazz, pop, and rock. As a jazz musician, he is known primarily for his performances with Helge Lien Trio In classical and contemporary music, he is primarily known as an orchestral bassist in the Oslo Philharmonic Orchestra (from 2010) and the Tampere Philharmonic Orchestra (2011). In addition, he has been known to play with John Parricelli, Peter Erskine, and Martin Robertson.

== Career ==
Berg was born in Oslo in 1971. He grew up in Australia, Belgium, France and England, before returning to Norway at 11 years old. In adolescence (1984–90) he lived in Lier and took piano and trumpet lessons. He joined a rock band while he was in school, and throughout his college years he played in Ti'nok, Trio April and Jazz House, or with established musicians such as Einar Iversen, Harald Gundhus, Odd Riisnæs, Christian Reim, and others. He was a member of the local band ...and we hate Johnny who played at the Kongsberg Jazz Festival in 1990. Afterwards, Berg enrolled at the Norwegian Academy of Music in Oslo that same year.

At the Norwegian Academy of Music, Berg studied classical bass under the guidance of Professor Knut Guettler. He has had a powerful influence on Norwegian music since 1992. In 1993, Berg toured with disco artist Donna Summer. In 2003, he released his first solo album, Dig It!. On this record, he collaborated with various well known Norwegian jazz musician such as Petter Wettre, Roy Powell, Sigurd Køhn, and Arild Andersen.

Berg has received great attention for his performances within Helge Lien Trio, and is known in Norway for his work with the musicians: Sir Paul McCartney, Bobby Shew, Andy Sheppard, Frank Gambale and Dee Dee Bridgewater, performing with Luciano Pavarotti. He has contributed to about 50 different albums, including Anno 96 with Oslo Groove Company, 8:97 with Knut Værnes, Spiral Circle (DIW, 2002) (which was nominated for the Spellemannprisen in 2002), Hello Troll (2008) (which received the Spellemannprisen in 2008), and Finger Magic with Erik Smith Trio.

== Honors ==
- Spellemannprisen 2008 in the class Jazz, for Hello Troll within Helge Lien Trio

== Discography ==
=== Solo albums ===
- 2003: Dig It! (Nagel-Heyer)

=== Collaborations ===
With Knut Værnes and Kim Ofstad

- 1995: Jacques Tati (Curling Legs)

With Oslo Groove Company

- 1996: Anno 1996 (Groove Records)

With Jens Wendelboe's Crazy Energy Jazz Quartet

- 1997: Get Crazy! (Crazy Music)
- 1997: Crazy Energy Jazz Quartet (Crazy Music)

With Knut Værnes & Danny Gottlieb

- 1997: 8:97 (Curling Legs)
- 1999: Super Duper (Curling Legs)

With Gisle Torvik

- 1999: Naken Uten Gitar, including with Sigmund Groven, Petter Wettre, Endre Christiansen and Torstein Lofthus

With Erik Smith Trio

- 2005: Finger Magic (Gats Production)

With Helge Lien Trio

- 2001: What are you doing the rest of your life? (Curling Legs)
- 2002: Spiral Circle (DIW)
- 2003: Asymmetrics (DIW)
- 2005: Helge Lien Trio – Live (Curling Legs)
- 2006: To the little radio(DIW)
- 2008: Hello Troll (Ozella)
- 2011: Natsukashii (Ozella)
- 2015: Bridges (ACT), feat. Adam Baldych

With Frank Brodahl's Trumpet Jungle

- 2003: Frank Brodahl's Trumpet Jungle (Trumpet Junge Records)

With Eidsvoll Storband

- 2003: Eidsvoll Storband (Trumpet Junge), with Sondre Brattland

With Even Skatrud Andersen

- 2005: Eveneven (Schmell)

The trio with Camilla Susann Haug

- 2005: Noen Ganger Blått (Kirkelig kulturverksted)

The trio with Silje Nergaard

- 2009: A Thousand True Stories (Sony)

With Petter Wettre

- 2014: Playing up to My Standards (Household Records), including with Bjørn Vidar Solli, Erlend Slettevoll and Adam Pache
