= Cutting Edge (band) =

Norwegian jazz-rock band

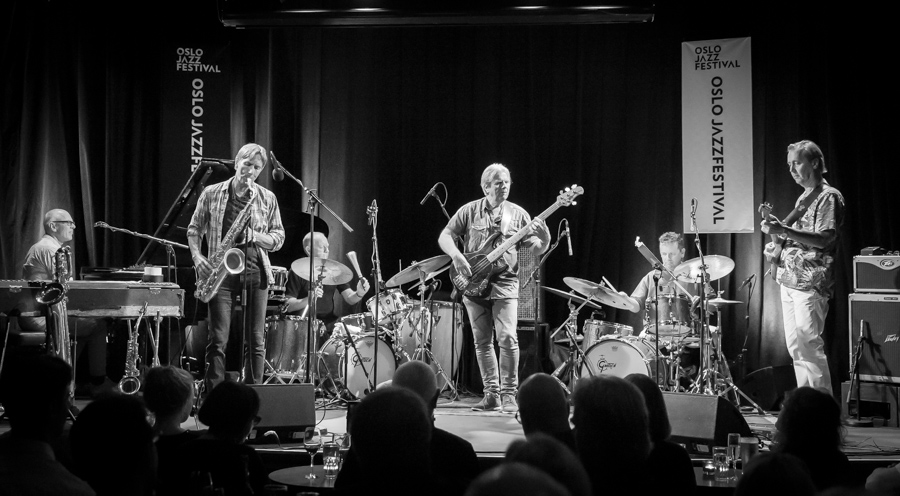
- Cutting Edge in 2016

Background information
- Origin: Oslo, Norway
- Genres: Jazz-rock
- Years active: 1981–1986/2002
- Labels: Odin, Curling Legs
- Members: Morten Halle; Knut Værnes; Edvard Askeland; Rune Klakegg; Frank Jakobsen; Stein Inge Brækhus
- Website: Cutting Edge from Norsk Musikkinformasjon

Cutting Edge established in Oslo, Norway (1981–1986, 2002), was a Norwegian jazz-rock quintet, known from three recordings in the 1980s, and cooperation with Jan Eggum on the album E.G.G.U.M (1985).

== Career ==
Their musical idea was to create improvised music profiting from the Groove in rock and yet the transparency in jazz. In a surprisingly short time, the band was established and represented Norway at EBU jazz festival, together with the jazz elite in Europe. After touring in Norway, the band recorded their first album in 1982, with Jan Erik Kongshaug as producer. The band was a hit on Norwegian clubs, and they were invited on a four-week UK tour which ended with a one-week engagement at the legendary Ronnie Scott's in London. The band was constituted by four of the members from Knut Værnes Quartet (Edvard Askeland, Morten Halle, Frank Jakobsen) supplemented by Rune Klakegg. They released two records on Odin Records, In addition to extensive touring. Frank Jakobsen was substituted for Stein Inge Brækhus on drums on their latest album in 1986. 16 years after their breakup, they had a great tour in 2002.

== Band members ==
- Morten Halle (saxophones)
- Knut Værnes (guitars)
- Edvard Askeland (bass)
- Frank Jakobsen (drums, 1981–1984, 2002)
- Stein Inge Brækhus (drums, 1984–1986)

== Discography ==
- Cutting Edge (Odin Records, 1982)
- Our Man In Paradise (Odin Records, 1984)
- Duesenberg (Curling Legs, 1986)
- Alle tre (Curling Legs, 1995)

Backing

- E.G.G.U.M (Grappa Records, 1985), with Jan Eggum
