= Pauline Hall (composer) =

Norwegian music critic and composer (1890–1969)

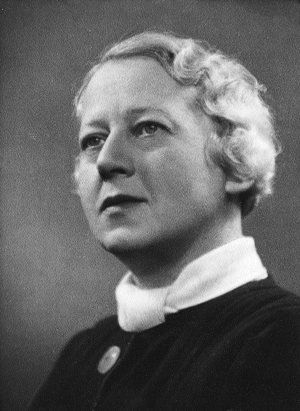
Pauline Margrete Hall (1890–1969)

Pauline Margrete Hall (2 August 1890 – 24 January 1969) was a Norwegian composer and music critic. She was the founding chairwoman of Ny Musikk (1938–1961) and served as president of the International Society for Contemporary Music (1952–1953).

== Background ==
Pauline Hall was born at Hamar in Hedmark, Norway. She was the daughter of Isak Muus Hall (1849–1914) and Magdalena Catharina Agersborg (1854–1934). Her father was a pharmacist who operated several pharmacies in Hamar, at Kabelvåg in Lofoten and in Tromsø.

From 1908 she studied piano with composer and pianist Johan Backer Lunde (1874–1958) in Kristiania (now Oslo). From 1910 to 1912 she studied the theory and composition of classical composers with music educator Catharinus Elling. She also had a study stay in Paris from 1912 to 1914.

== Career ==
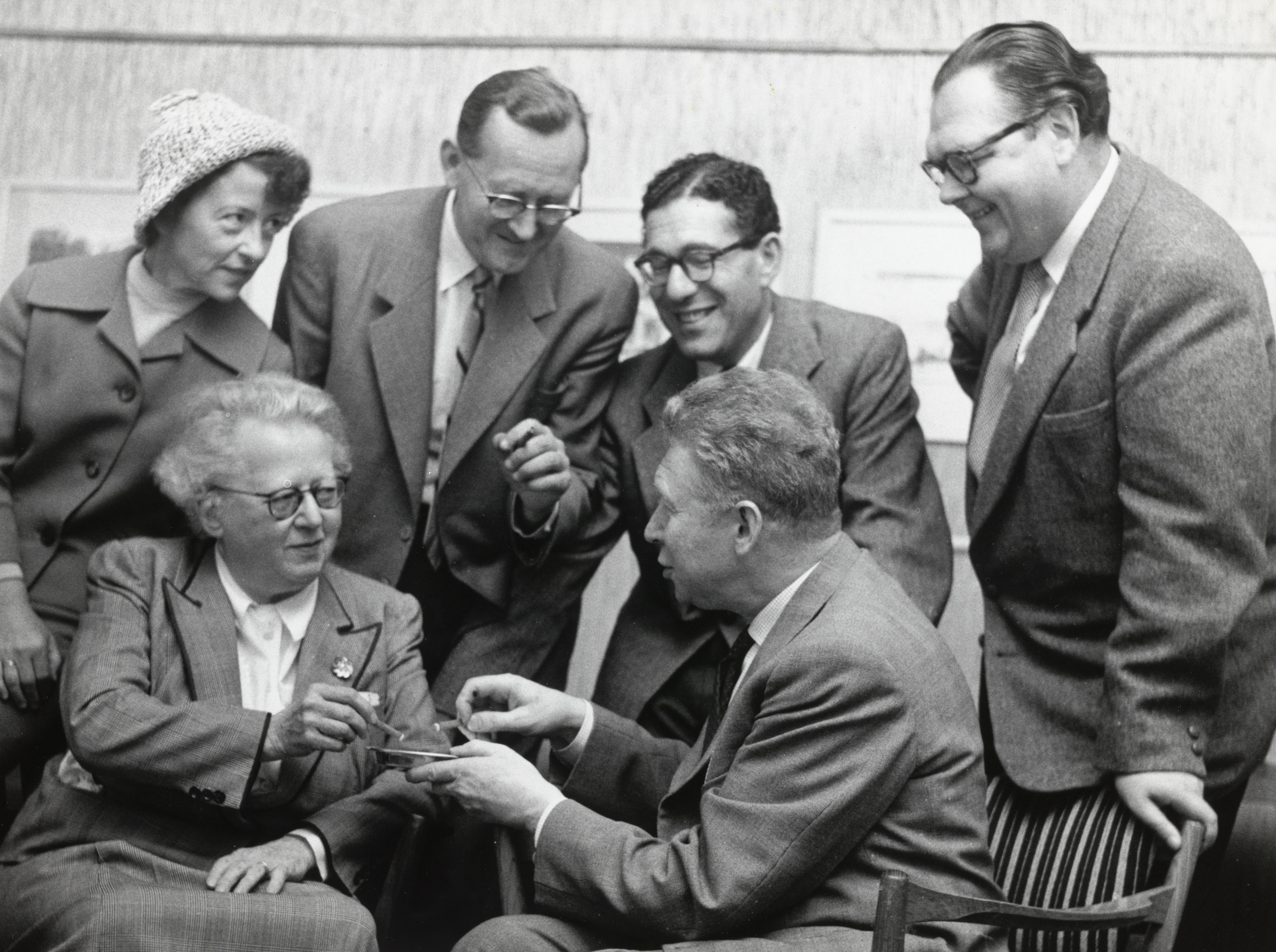
Pauline Hall with board of NyMusikk, 1958

Hall's debut as a composer came in 1917 with a full-length concert evening in Oslo featuring solely her works. Hall was initially known as a composer of romances, but today her orchestral works, and in particular 1929's Verlaine Suite, stand out as centerpieces of her compositional output. French impressionism and literature would prove to be key sources of inspiration for Hall, an influx that would not necessarily resonate well with the prevailing national romanticism sentiment of 1930s Norway. Throughout her compositional career, Hall would find it challenging to introduce new stylistic impulses to the Norwegian music scene.

In addition to her orchestral output, Hall also composed a number of choral works and music for stage productions. Theatre remained close to her heart, and Hall translated a number of major works into Norwegian including Igor Stravinsky’s Soldier’s Tale and Arthur Honegger’s Le Roi David. In 1930, she translated, staged and directed The Threepenny Opera (Die Dreigroschenoper) by Bertolt Brecht and Kurt Weill. Hall also served as instructor and conductor for its Oslo premiere.

She wrote music for radio and started Pauline Hall's vocal quintet in 1932. From 1934 to 1964, she worked as music critic for the Oslo daily newspaper Dagbladet. Hall was known for criticism of dilettantism and superficial national composers and her promotion of modern music.

In 1938 she was the founding chairwoman of Ny Musikk, the Norwegian section of the International Society for Contemporary Music (ISCM). She also served as president of ISCM International from 1952–53, and took over management of the ISCM International Music Festival in Oslo in 1953. She served as chair of Ny Musikk until 1961 when she was succeeded by composer Finn Mortensen.

== Personal life ==
Pauline Hall received the King's Medal of Merit (Kongens fortjenstmedalje) in gold in 1938. She died in Oslo and was buried at Vestre gravlund.

== Selected works ==
Hall composed orchestral works, theater and film music, chamber music and vocal works. Selected compositions include:

- 1929 Verlaine Suite, for orchestra
- 1933 Cirkusbilleder, for orchestra
- 1949 Suite av scenemusikken til «Julius Caesar» på Nationaltheateret, for orchestra
- Foxtrott, for orchestra
- 1950 Markisen, ballet, première: 1964, Oslo, Den Norske Opera
- 1947 Ro ro te rara, for male choir
- En gutt gikk ut på elskovssti, for male choir, text: Gunnar Larsen
- Nachtwandler, for 6 part mixed choir and orchestra, text: Falke
- Til kongen, for mixed choir
- To Wessel-tekster, for male choir, op. 7, text: Johan Herman Wessel
- 1945 Fangens aftensang, for voice and piano
- 1961 Fire Tosserier, for voice, clarinet, bassoon, trumpet and French horn
- Du blomst i dug, for voice and piano, text: Iens Petter Jacobsen
- Rondeau, for voice and piano, text: E. Solstad
- Tagelied, for voice and orchestra
- Tango, for voice and orchestra
- To sanger, for voice and piano, op. 4, text: Knut Hamsun Auerdahl
- 1945 Suite, for wind quintet
- Liten dansesuite, for oboe, clarinet and bassoon

Her music has been recorded and issued on CD, including:

- Pauline Hall: Verlaine Suite/Julius Caesar Suite/Suite for Winds/4 Tosserier (26 June 2007) Simax Records/Premiere, ASIN: B000027ALU

== Other sources ==
- Yoell, John H. (1974). The Nordic sound: explorations into the music of Denmark, Norway. (Crescendo Pub. Co). ISBN 978-0875970905.
- Grinde, Nils (1981). Contemporary Norwegian music, 1920–1980. (Columbia Univ Press). ISBN 978-8200056935.
- Kvalbein, Astrid (2013). Musikalsk modernisering: Pauline Hall (1890–1969) som komponist, teatermenneske og Ny Musikk-leiar. NMH. hdl:11250/172651. ISBN 9788278530788.
