= Bergen Blues Band =

Norwegian blues band

- Origin: Bergen, Norway
- Genres: Blues
- Years active: 1974–1984
- Labels: Harvest Records; EMI; Hungry Records
- Past members: John Magnar Bernes; Per Jørgensen; Kåre Sandvik; Edvard Askeland; Frank Jakobsen; Willy Korneliussen; Rune Rønning; Ole Thomsen; Atle Mjørlaug

Bergen Blues Band (1974 - 1984) was a Norwegian blues band from Bergen, Norway.

== Biography ==
The band was founded and led by John Magnar Bernes (vocalist and harmonica player, alias «Hungry John»), along with Per Jørgensen on guitar (replaced by Ole Thomsen in 1981), Kåre Sandvik on piano (1974–81), Edvard Askeland bass (replaced by Rune Rønning in 1981, and later Atle Mjørlaug 1983), and Frank Jakobsen drums (replaced by Willy Korneliussen in 1976). Zoltan Vincze joined the band together with Per Jørgensen in 1983.

== Discography ==
- 1980: Bergen Blues Band (Harvest Records)
- 1982: Another Blues (Harvest Records)
- 1983: Blues Hit Me (EMI)

Compilations

- 2009: The Best of Bergen Blues Band (Hungry Records)
