= Invisible Threads =

Studio album by John Surman
- Released: 19 January 2018
- Recorded: July 2017
- Studio: Rainbow Studio; Oslo, Norway
- Genre: Jazz
- Length: 59:13
- Label: ECM; ECM 2588
- Producer: Manfred Eicher

John Surman chronology
Another Sky (2014)	Invisible Threads (2018)

Invisible Threads is an album by English saxophonist and composer John Surman recorded in Norway in July 2017 and released on ECM January the following year. The trio features Nelson Ayres on piano and Rob Waring on vibraphone and marimba.

== Reception ==
Professional ratings
Review scores
Source	Rating
PopMatters	7/10 stars
AllMusic	4/5 stars
All About Jazz	3/5 stars

The PopMatters review by Steve Horowitz stated "This is jazz meant for a quiet room. The trio creates a space where a listener can drift along without getting tired. There's an energy to the playing that lifts one into a pleasant state and a good-humor to the enterprise as a whole. The mutual respect the musicians have for each other is evident by the space in which they give themselves to play. The silence between the instruments and the attentive pacing in which they perform suggests they are carefully listening to each other rather than just waiting for their turn."

The AllMusic review by Thom Jurek notes "As a whole, Invisible Threads is an approachable but major work of melodic improvisation and tonal inquiry."

All About Jazz reviewer Samuel Stroup said, "This band of veteran musicians achieves what it sets out to do on Invisible Threads, mixing their improvisational skill with the rhythmic intricacies that make the album's songs unique. The trio's light sound never becomes flimsy, each member occupying his varying amount of authority, moment by moment. Surman masterfully leads the group through his exercises in cohesion in the flowing and pulsing music."

== Track listing ==
All tracks are written by John Surman except where noted

No.	Title	Writer(s)	Length
1.	"At First Sight"		2:33
2.	"Autumn Nocturne"		6:52
3.	"Within the Clouds"		4:48
4.	"Byndweed"		5:11
5.	"On Still Waters"		4:45
6.	"Another Reflection"		1:33
7.	"The Admiral"		5:15
8.	"Pitanga Pitomba"		7:06
9.	"Summer Song"	Nelson Ayres	5:22
10.	"Concentric Circles"		6:32
11.	"Stoke Damerel"		3:37
12.	"Invisible Threads"		5:39
Total length:			59:13

== Personnel ==
- John Surman – soprano saxophone, baritone saxophone, bass clarinet
- Nelson Ayres – piano
- Rob Waring – vibraphone, marimba
