= Carl Haakon Waadeland =

Norwegian musician and educator (born 1952)

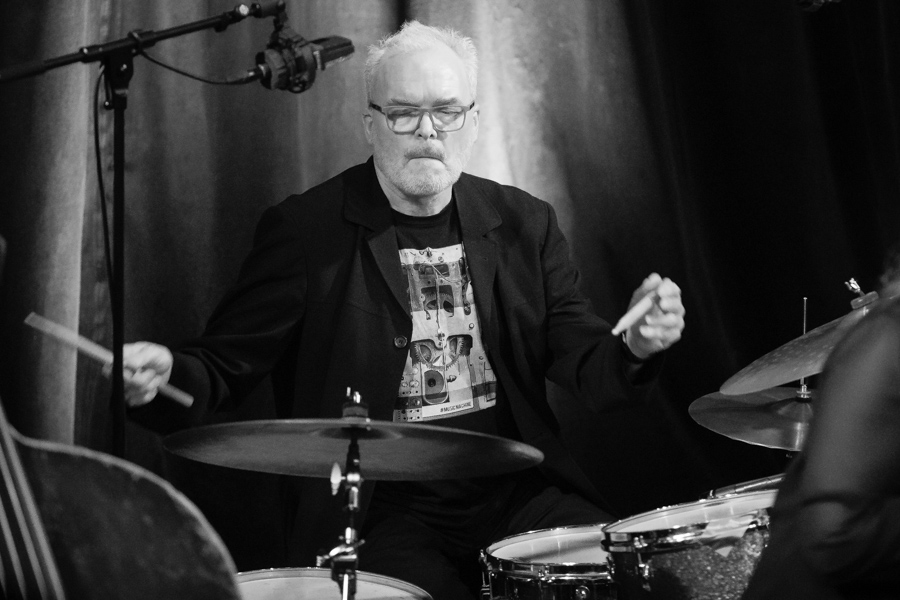
- Waadeland performing in 2020

Background information
- Born: 8 November 1952 (age 73); Trondheim, Sør-Trøndelag
- Occupations: Musician, educator
- Instrument: Drums

Carl Haakon Waadeland (born 8 November 1952) is a Norwegian musicologist and jazz drummer, known from several bands and releases such as with Dadafon, Dum Dum Boys, Åge & Sambandet, Halvdan Sivertsen, Warne Marsh, Kenny Wheeler, Annbjørg Lien, Henning Sommerro, Bjørn Alterhaug, John Pål Inderberg, Knutsen & Ludvigsen, Mikis Theodorakis and Arja Saijonmaa. He was one of the driving forces behind the jazz program at NTNU which he also directed.

== Career ==
Waadeland holds a master's degree in mathematics and PhD in music theory from the NTNU, where he concentrates on rhythm, swing, music performance (performologi), rhythm and movement, as a professor of Music. In his PhD thesis he developed simulation models of rhythm abnormalities (2000). Waadeland has performed and released several albums with jazz bands such as Bodega Band, Siri's Svale Band, and Dadafon (1995–2002).

He otherwise has contributed a number of releases by Mid-Norwegian artists Knutsen & Ludvigsen, Gary Holton & Casino Steel (1982), Hans Rotmo, Terje Tysland, Halvdan Sivertsen, Hilde Heltberg, Åge Aleksandersen, Øystein Dolmen, Dum Dum Boys and Henning Sommerro.

He performed repeatedly at Moldejazz Festival, Kongsberg Jazz Festival, Nattjazz in Bergen, Festival of North Norway, Trondheim Jazz Festival, St. Olav Festival in Trondheim, and Trøndelag Theatre and Concert scenes.

== Selected publications ==
- Waadeland, C. H. (2011). Rhythm performance from a spectral point of view. In A. R. Jensenius, A. Tveit, R. I. Godøy & D. Overholt (Eds.), Proceedings of the International Conference on New Interfaces for Musical Expression (pp. 248–251). University of Oslo.
- Waadeland, C.H (2006). The influence of tempo on movement and timing in rhythm performance. In: Proceedings of 9th international conference on music perception and cognition. Bologna University Press, 2006, ISBN 88-7395-155-4, pp. 45–46.
- Waadeland, C.H (2006). Strategies in empirical studies of swing groove. Studia Musicologica Norvegica (32) pp. 169–191.
- Waadeland, C.H. (2003). Analysis of Jazz Drummers' Movements in Performance of Swing Grooves – A Preliminary Report. Proceedings of the Stockholm Music Acoustics Conference, 6–9 August 2003 (SMAC 03), Volume II (573–576). KTH, Stockholm. ISBN 91-7283-559-1. Journal of New Music Research 30(1), 23–37.
- Waadeland, C.H. (2001). "It Don't Mean a Thing If It Ain't Got That Swing" – Simulating Expressive Timing by Modulated Movements. Journal of New Music Research 30(1), pp. 23–37.
- Waadeland, C.H. (1991). Trommeslåtter- en trommeslagers skattekiste (bok+kassett). Trondheim: TIMA Forlag. New release 2008: Norsk Musikforlag A/S: Bok+CD.
- Danielsen, A, Waadeland, C.H, Sundt, H.G. (2008). Identifying Timing by Sound: Timbral Qualities of Micro-Rhythm. In: Proceedings of the 10th International Conference on Music Perception and Cognition. ICMPC10, Sapporo, Japan, 2008, ISBN 978-4-9904208-0-2. s. 74
- Petrini, Karin; Pollick, Frank E; Dahl, S; McAleer, P; McKay, L; Rocchesso, Davide; Waadeland, Carl Haakon; Love, Scott; Avanzini, Federico; Puce, Aina (2011). Action expertise reduces brain activity for audiovisual matching actions: An fMRI study with expert drummers. NeuroImage Volum 56.(3) s. 1480–1492

== Discography ==
=== As Carl Haakon ===
Solo projects

- 2008: Din Råta Tjuv (Heilo), nominated for the Norwegian Folk Music Awards 2008, in several classes

=== As Karl Håkon ===
Within Søyr

- 1977: Søyr (MAI 7705)

With DumDum Boys

- 1988: Blodig Alvor Na Na Na Na Na (CBS)

=== As Carlos ===
With TNT

- 1988: Tell No Tales (Vertigo)

With Gary Holton & Casino Steel

- 1983: III Edition (Polydor)
- 1984: No 4 (Polydor)
