= Erling Aksdal =

Norwegian jazz pianist and composer (born 1953)

Erling Aksdal Jr.
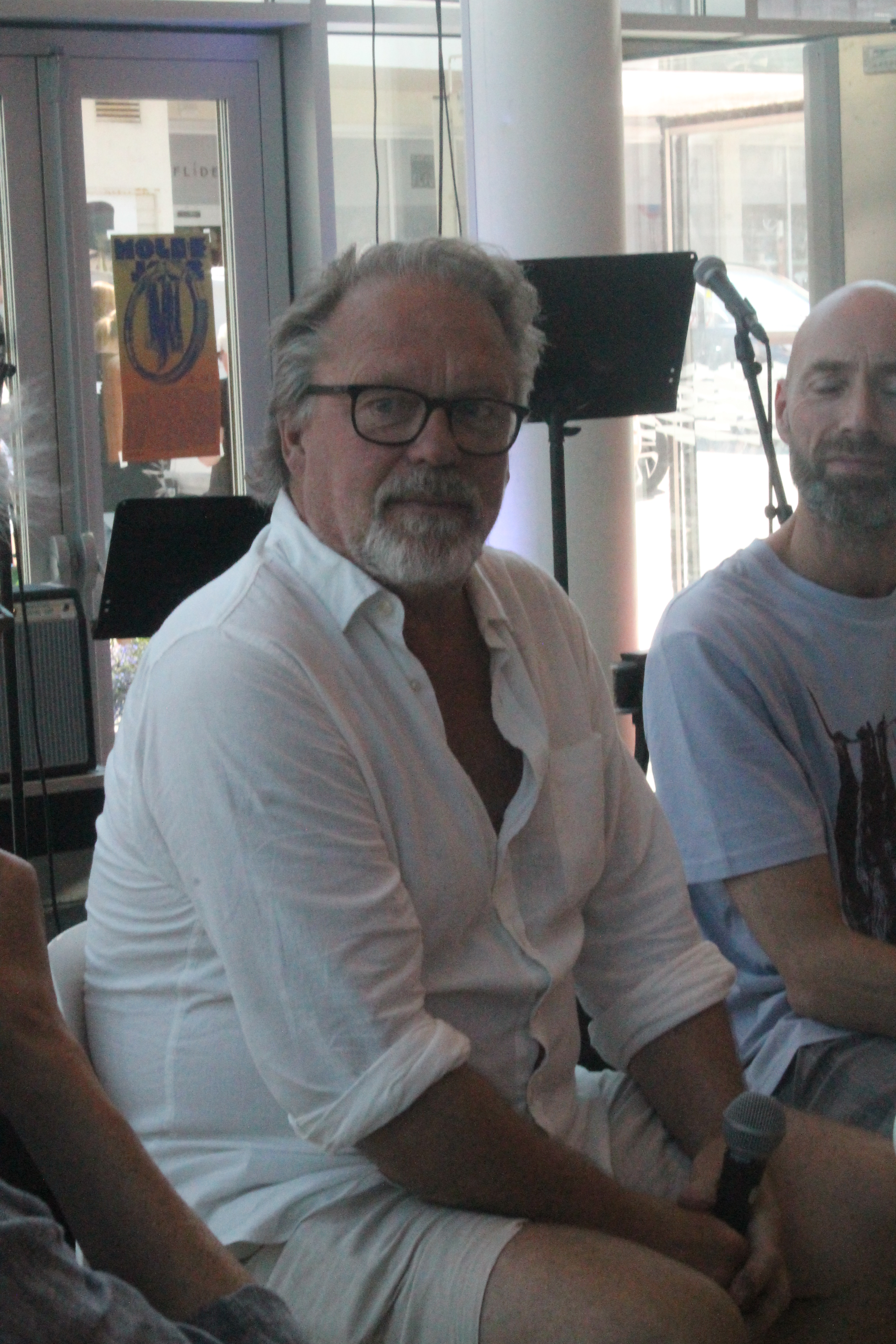
- Aksdal in 2025

Background information
- Born: 18 February 1953 (age 73); Molde, Norway
- Genre: Jazz
- Occupations: Musician, composer
- Instrument: Piano

Erling Aksdal Jr. (born 18 February 1953 in Molde, Norway) is a Norwegian jazz pianist and composer, known from playing with the likes of Warne Marsh, Chet Baker, Herb Pomeroy, Bob Mover, Mick Goodrick, Ralph Moore, Lee Konitz, John Pål Inderberg and Bjørn Alterhaug, and writing the commissioned works for Moldejazz in 1980 and 1995.

== Career ==
Aksdal was educated at the Berklee College of Music (1977–80), and earned a master's degree in Jazz and Contemporary Improvisationat at the New England Conservatory in Boston (1984). He has since 1991 taught on the Jazz program at Trondheim Musikkonsevatorium, where he is Head of the Jazz Performance Programme (directing manager until 2005). He is also head of «Midtnorsk jazzsenter» and representative in the «Norsk Jazzforum».

His performing career started in association with Storyville Jazz Club during studies in Boston, in addition to local bands in Bergen (1972–73) where he was part of «Søbstad/Halvorsens Quintet», and Molde (1973–75) with his own trio and E. A. Sextet, including Alf Kjellman and Torgrim Sollid in the lineup, and for the latter he contributed on the album Østerdalsmusikk (1975). When in the US he played with among others Herb Pomeroy, Bob Mover, Mick Goodrick and Ralph Moore, conducted his own orchestra with the commission to the anniversary concert at the Moldejazz in 1980, and was in the «New Cool Quartet» (1982). Aksdal moved to Oslo and joined the Magni Wentzel Quintet (1975–76). He also played with Bjarne Nerem, Bjørn Johansen with the album Dear Henrik (1986), Harald Gundhus and «Atle Hammer Quintet», Harald Bergersen and Krister Andersson, during his years in Oslo. In addition he composed the commissioned work Sonus in Obscuri, with among others Eldbjørg Raknes for Moldejazz 1995.

In Molde Aksdal composed music for Teatret Vårt in Molde (1988–1990), and in Trondheim (1991–) he played within «Asmund Bjørken Sextet» (Pot's On, 1992), toured with Lee Konitz and co-musicians from the Jazz program at «Tronheim Musikkonservatorium» within «John Pål Inderberg Band», releasing the album Steps Towards A Dream (1993). He was within «Friends Connection» (1994), and has otherwise participated in Eldbjørg Raknes Quintet (1997), the album Sval Draum (2005) by John Pål Inderberg, and Veckan 44 (2008) within «Norsk Svensk Cool Quintet».

== Compositions ==
- Commission for Moldejazz 1980, at the 20-year anniversary
- Commission for Moldejazz, Sonus in Obscuri 1995, also performed at the «Nordlysfestivalen» (1996), with among others Eldbjørg Raknes

== Discography ==
- 1975: Østerdalsmusikk (MAI), with Torgrim Sollid
- 1984: Hotelsuite (Odin Records), with Espen Rud
- 1986: Dear Henrik (Gemini Records), with Bjørn Johansen
- 1987: For the time being (Hot Club Records), with Warne Marsh
- 1989: Norwegian Radio Big Band meets Bill Holman (Taurus Records)
- 1992: Pot's On (Gemini Records), within «Asmund Bjørken Sextet»
- 1993: Steps Towards A Dream (Odin Records), with Lee Konitz, John Pål Inderberg and Bjørn Alterhaug
- 2005: Sval Draum (Taurus Records), with John Pål Inderberg
- 2008: Veckan 44 (Sonor Records), with «Norsk Svensk Cool Quintet»

== See also ==
- List of jazz pianists
