= Edvard Askeland =

Norwegian jazz bassist (born 1954)

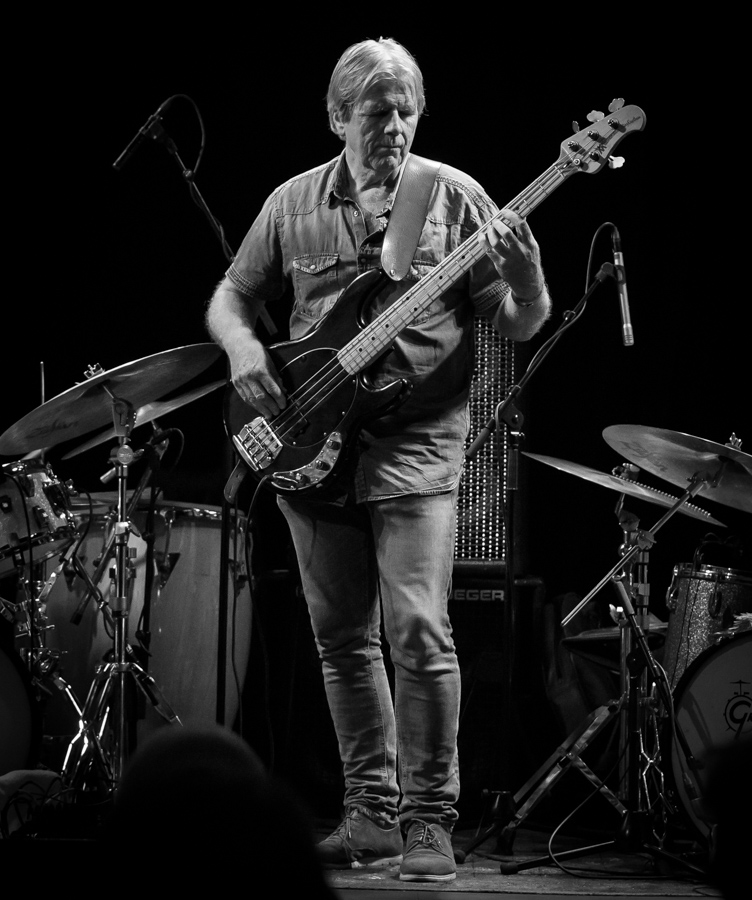
- Askeland at Oslo Jazzfestival 2016

Background information
- Born: 10 December 1954 (age 71); Bergen, Hordaland, Norway
- Genres: Jazz
- Occupations: Musician, composer
- Instruments: Upright bass, vocals
- Formerly of: Cutting Edge
- Website: www.groove.no/artist/42781992/edvard-askeland

Edvard Askeland (born 10 December 1954) is a Norwegian jazz bassist, known from a series of album releases in various genres and for being regular in Dag Arnesens lineups in 1970–80, and within Cutting Edge.

== Career ==
Askeland was born in Bergen, Norway. He was educated at Bergen Lærerhøgskole, and University of Oslo (Bachelor in music). During his musical period in Bergen he played within different Dag Arnesen lineups, within «Danmarksplass Jazz & Rock» and «Bergen Blues Band» (1974–80), to mention a few. After moving to Oslo in 1980, he joined the band «Country Team» (1980–82) and various jazz bands, like «Eim», Søyr and Frode Thingnæs Big Band. The contributions in the renowned Cutting Edge resulted in four record releases during the 1980'es with Knut Værnes, Morten Halle, Rune Klakegg, Frank Jakobsen and Stein Inge Brækhus. In 2004 he established the Bass Ensemble «BassoNova» together with Stein Erik Tafjord. He also has played on tour with Morten Halle Quartet, and was in the lineup for Van Morrison at Vossajazz in 1988.

In other genres, he has contributed on among others Alarmen går (1982) with Jan Eggum, and Fra nei til ja (1994) with Ole Paus. Poems by Hans Børli was released on Prøv å sette vinger på en stein (1996) with Katja Medbøe. He was central in Kjell Habbestad's Noahs draum (1998). Askeland composed music to texts by the poet Olav H. Hauge on Under stjernone (2005), where Hildegun Riise recite poems, Per Jørgensen play trumpet, Eivind Aarset (guitar) and Paolo Vinaccia (drums). This material was premiered at Vossajazz in 2005.

Askeland was awarded Gammleng-prisen class studio in 1993 and from April 2007 General Manager of Oslo Jazzfestival.

== Honors ==
- Gammleng-prisen 1993 in the class Studio musician

== Discography (in selection) ==
Within Cutting Edge

- 1982: Cutting Edge (Odin)
- 1984: Our Man In Paradise (Odin)
- 1986: Duesenberg (Curling Legs)
- 1995: Alle Tre (Curling Legs), Compilation

With Jan Eggum

- 1984: Alarmen Går (Karussell), with Jan Eggum
- 1985: E.G.G.U.M (Grappa Music), within «Cutting Edge»
- 1996: Dacapo (Grappa Music)

With other projects

- 1975: Kjerringrokk Om Kvinner (Polydor), with «Kjerringrokk»
- 1980: Bergen Blues Band (Harvest, EMI Norge), within «Bergen Blues Band»
- 1982: Ny Bris (Odin), with Dag Arnesen on "En Sint Glad Marsj - Mot Swingen"
- 1984: Cierny Peter (Mai), within Søyr
- 1985: Reisefeber (Slager Records), with Steinar Ofsdal
- 1992: Wenches Jul (Slager Records), with Wenche Myhre (Children Choir: Anine Kruse, Benedikte Kruse, Christina Møllen, Live Maartmann, Lotte Gjøstøl)
- 1993: Våre Beste Barnesanger II (Grappa Music)
- 1993: Live At Gildevangen (Bare Bra Musikk), with Harald Heide-Steen Jr. alias Sylfest Strutle
- 1996: Prøv å sette vinger på en stein, Kirkelig Kulturverksted, poems by Hans Børli
- 1998: Livsglede (AMK 9801), with Anne-Marie Kvien
- 2000: Tein (Anchi Litt Av Hvert...), with Anne Grimstad Fjeld
- 2002: Nære Ting (Traffic Trading ), with Tor Endresen & Rune Larsen
