= Aina Puce =

Aina Puce is the Eleanor Cox Riggs Professor of Social Justice and Ethics in the Department of Psychological and Brain Sciences at Indiana University in Bloomington, Indiana, US. Her research is on the brain basis of understanding the actions of others. She is the coauthor with Riitta Hari of MEG-EEG Primer (Oxford University Press), an introduction to magnetoencephalography (MEG) and electroencephalography (EEG) techniques for studying brain activity noninvasively.

== Education ==
Puce earned B.App.Sc. (Biophysics/Instrumental Science) and M.App.Sc.(Physics) degrees from the then Swinburne Institute of Technology [now Swinburne University of Technology] in 1981 and 1986. Her Ph.D. (Medicine) was completed at the University of Melbourne in 1990, with research work on the epileptogenic temporal lobe being completed in the Neurology Department at the Austin Hospital. She then completed postdoctoral studies in neurosurgery at the Yale University School of Medicine 1993–1994.

== Career ==
Puce holds a named professorship as the Eleanor Cox Riggs Professor of Social Justics and Ethics in the Department of Psychological and Brain Sciences at Indiana University. She has served as the deputy director for the Brain Sciences Institute at Swinburne University in Melbourne, Australia; as the director of neuroimaging at West Virginia University School of Medicine; and as the director of the Imaging Research Facility at Indiana University. She was a Senior Editor of the journal NeuroImage, and was an Associate Editor for Perspectives on Psychological Science.
