= Olga Mykytenko =

Ukrainian opera singer

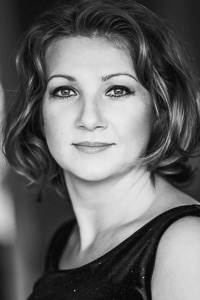
Olga Mykytenko

Olga Mykytenko (Ukrainian: Ольга Микитенко) is a Ukrainian and German soprano opera singer.

== Biography ==
Born in Zhytomyr, Ukraine, Olga Mykytenko made her debut as a soloist in 1995 at the National Opera of Ukraine in Kyiv and performed there through 2003. She won several international awards, including the Grand Prix at the Maria Callas International Singing contest in Athens (1997), 2nd prize and Special Award at Francisco Vinas contest in Barcelona (1997) and 1st prize at the Queen Sonja International Music Competition in Oslo (2003).

Since 2001, Olga Mykytenko has performed at various world-renowned opera houses, such as the Mariinsky Theatre, the Berlin State Opera, the Royal Swedish Opera, the Deutsche Oper Berlin, and the Metropolitan Opera.

In 2017, Olga published her first philosophical novel "Solo OM", a novella with autobiographical qualities. The novel has been translated into English and German.

In 2020, she published the album "I Vespri Verdiani" —Verdi Arias in cooperation with the Bournemouth Symphony Orchestra under Kirill Karabits.

In October 2021, she released an album entitled Lichter Sonnenschein (Lieder von Richard Strauss).

== Awards ==
- 1997 — The Tenor Viñas Opera Competition (Barcelona) — 2nd prize (1st prize not awarded), award "Voce extraordinaire";
- 1997 — The International Maria Callas Competition (Athens) — Gold Medal and Grand Prix.
- 2003 — International Queen Sonia Competition (Oslo) — first prize.
