= Knut Værnes =

Norwegian jazz musician, composer and band leader (born 1954)

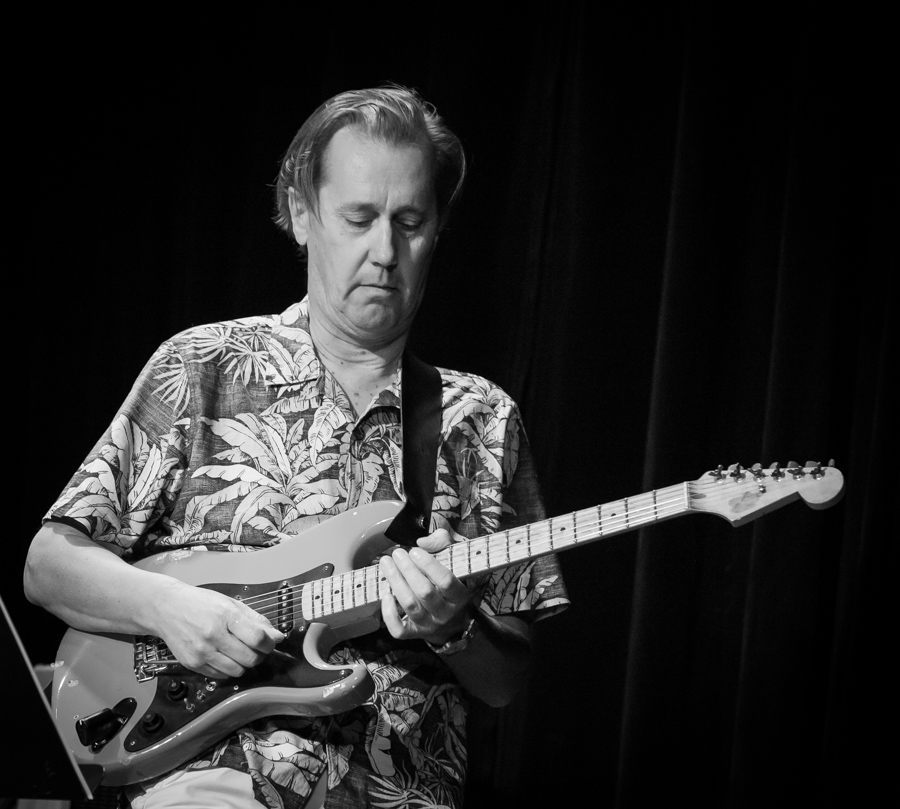
- Værnes at Oslo Jazzfestival 2016

Background information
- Born: 1 April 1954 (age 72); Trondheim, Sør-Trøndelag
- Origin: Norway
- Genres: Jazz
- Occupations: Jazz musician, composer
- Instrument: Guitar
- Label: Curling Legs
- Member of: Cutting Edge
- Website: Official website

Knut Værnes (born 1 April 1954) is a Norwegian jazz musician (guitar), composer and band leader, known from several recordings in the jazz rock genre. He grew up at Bøler in Oslo, where he became an accomplished guitarist.

== Career ==
Værnes was born in Trondheim, Norway. He is a graduate from the University of Oslo and has attended master classes at the Manhattan School of Music, and played within pop and rock bands like «Salt & Pepper», «Shimmy», and the fusion band «Vanessa» with the record release City Lips (1975). Then musical studies in Oslo and Bergen brought him on to the Norwegian jazz scene with albums like Anatomy of the guitar (1979), in collaboration with his guitar teacher Jon Eberson, within Nils Petter Molvær's funk band «Punktum» and Håkon Graf's «Graffiti». In the 1980s, he studied with John Scofield at the Manhattan School of Music.

Værnes led his own Trio and Quartet with co-musicians Morten Halle (saxophone), Edvard Askeland (bass) and Frank Jakobsen (drums). The Quartet continued as the band Cutting Edge resulting in four album releases. In duo with Terje Gewelt bass was released Admission for guitars and basses (1992) with their own compositions. KVT (with Kim Ofstad drums and Frode Berg bass) released Jacques Tati (1995), and with Danny Gottlieb, drummer of Pat Metheny Group as substitute for Ofstad, «8:97» (1997) as well as Super Duper (1999). Knut Værnes Band (Morten Halle, Nils Petter Molvær, Rune Arnesen og Gewelt) released Roneo (1993). The guitar quartet composed of Knut Reiersrud, Bjørn Klakegg and Frode Alnæs released «4G» (2000).

Værnes has participated on numerous recordings in different genres, including Geirr Lystrup's Songen om kjærleika (1980), Etterlatte sanger (1986)together with Sidsel Endresen and Jonas Fjeld, Jan Eggum's (E.G.G.U.M. (1995) and Stilig (1986), and Gym (1997) with Di Derre. In 2001 he was awarded Gammleng-prisen in the category jazz. His latest release is A night in the cassis (2004), where his music is arranged for the Vertavo String Quartet. Værnes trio played at the Trondheim Jazz Festival 2006, and recently he has cooperated with the Swedish double bassist Lars Danielsson.

Værnes is co-owner of the music companies Curling Legs (1986- ) and Musikkoperatørene, members of FONO (the association for Norwegian independent record labels), sat as chairman of the Association of Norwegian Jazz Musicians for a period, and was chairman of the Committee for Spellemannprisen. He also teaches at the Nordic Institute for Stage and Studio.

== Honors ==
- Gammleng-prisen 2001 in the category jazz

== Discography ==
=== Solo albums ===
Within Knut Værnes Band

- 1993: Roneo (Curling Legs)
- 2013: Tributes (Curling Legs)

Within Knut Værnes Trio
Including Kim Ofstad (drums) and Frode Berg (bass)

- 1995: Jacques Tati (Curling Legs)

Including Danny Gottlieb (drums) and Frode Berg (bass)

- 1997: «8:97» (Curling Legs)
- 1999: Super Duper (Curling Legs)

=== Collaborative works ===
Within Vanessa

- 1975: City lips

With Jon Eberson

- 1979: Anatomy of the guitar

Within Cutting Edge

- 1982: Cutting Edge
- 1983: Our man in paradise
- 1986: Duesenberg

Duo with Terje Gewelt

- 1992: Admission For Guitars And Basses (Curling Legs)

With other projects

- 2000: 4G, with Frode Alnæs, Knut Reiersrud and Bjørn Klakegg
- 1980: Songen om kjærleika, with Geirr Lystrup
- 1986: Etterlatte sanger, with Sidsel Endresen and Jonas Fjeld
- 1986: Stilig (Single), with Jan Eggum
- 1985: E.G.G.U.M., with Jan Eggum
- 1997: Gym, with Di Derre
- 2004: A night in Cassis (Curling Legs), with the Vertavo String Quartet

Awards
Preceded by Kristin Asbjørnsen	Recipient of the Jazz Gammleng-prisen; 2001	Succeeded by Vigleik Storaas
