= Rogier Telderman =

- Background information
- Genre: jazz, contemporary
- Occupation(s): musician, composer
- Instruments: piano
- Official website: www.telderman.com

Rogier Telderman (born in Utrecht, 1982) is a Dutch jazz pianist, composer and band leader. He is known for his groups the Rogier Telderman Trio and Rogier Telderman's Triptych.

== Awards ==
In 2016 Telderman was awarded the Young VIP-award by the jazz bookers of the Netherlands, as most talented young jazz artist of the country.

== Discography ==
As a leader:

- Baldych Courtois Telderman (ACT Music, 2020) - Clouds
- Rogier Telderman Trio (RM Records, 2015) - Contours

As a sideman:

- TEMKO (M-Recordings, 2016) - Darkness Rises
- Melphi (Snip Records, 2014) - Through The Looking Glass
