= Rune Klakegg =

Norwegian jazz pianist and composer (born 1955)

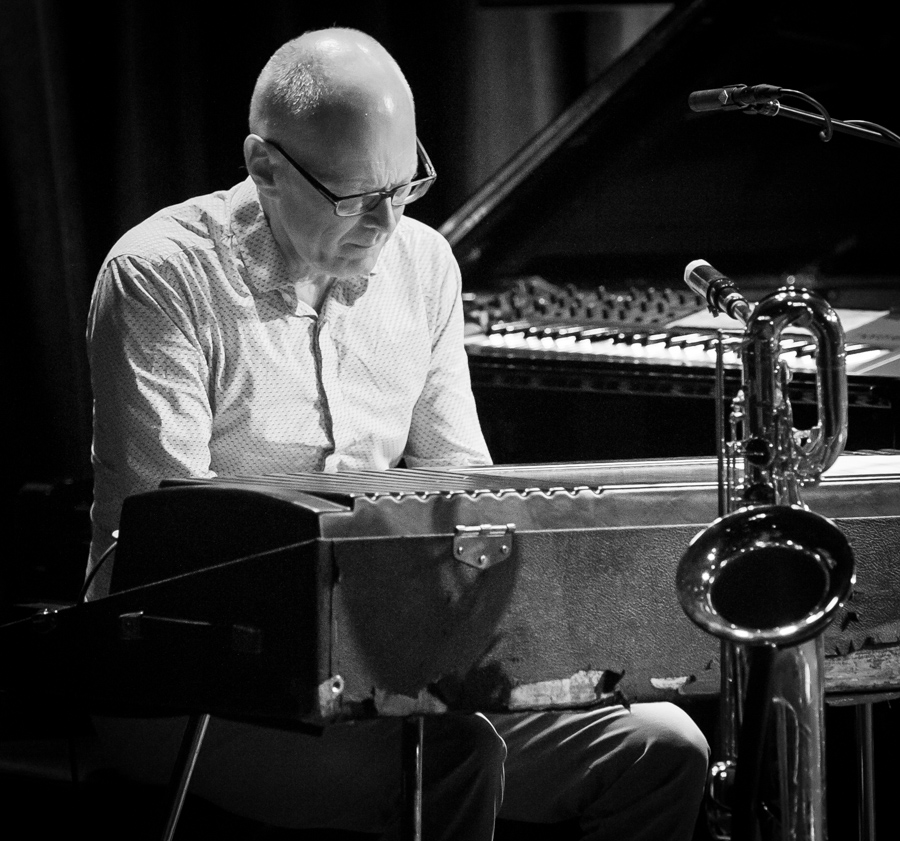
- Klakegg at Oslo Jazzfestival 2016

Background information
- Born: 19 April 1955 (age 71); Skien, Norway
- Genres: Jazz
- Occupations: Musician, composer
- Instrument: Piano
- Website: www.runeklakegg.no

Rune Klakegg (born 19 April 1955 in Skien, Norway) is a Norwegian jazz pianist and composer, the older brother of guitarist Bjørn Klakegg, and known from a number of recordings and jazz bands including Oslo 13, Cutting Edge, Fuzzy Logic, Out to Lunch and Søyr.

== Career ==
Klakegg played within and composed music for bands like Cutting Edge, "Søyr", Fuzzy Logic, and "Out to Lunch". He led his own Rune Klakegg Trio (from 1986) with Frank Jakobsen (drums) and Olaf Kamfjord (bass) on the album Anaerobics (1991). Later they were replaced by Edvard Askeland (bass) and Helge Nordbakken (drums). He has also contributed on releases by Espen Rud, Susanne Fuhr, Morten Halle, Guttorm Guttormsen, Bjørn Kjellemyr, Alfred Janson, Sigurd Janson and Per Eriksen.

He has also composed music to texts by the poet Jacob Sande, released on the album Sundslegen, herja og naken (2006) with Lars Klevstrand, Bjørn Klakegg and Jan Olav Renvåg. Klakegg has played within "Øvrevoll spelemannslag" with Ragnar Heyerdahl, Eilif Moe and Kjetil Sandum, and they reseased the album Spillegal (2006). He also contributes on an album with Tine Asmundsen Band, Elin Ødegaard (2000), Lars Martin Myhre (2001, 2006) and within Guro Gravem Johansen Trio, play in trio with Carl Størmer and Jan Olav Renvåg, and has toured with Brit Bildøen, Bjarne Magnus Jensen and Johannes Martens. With Roy Nikolaisen he played in the Quartet "Changes".

In 1995 he was awarded "Work of the Year" by "NOPA" Prize for the tune "Pamplemousse". Klakegg has taught jazz piano at Foss videregående skole and was editor of "Jazznytt" (1984–87). He lives in Skien (2012) and teaches at Skien videregående skole.

Klakegg's Romantic Notions (2012) is his debut in the acoustic piano trio format, with bassist Jan Olav Renvåg and drummer Roger Johansen, and serves nine of their own later compositions with certain pianistic hand and eloquent improvisations.

== Discography ==
=== Solo albums ===
- 1991: Anaerobics (Odin Records), R.K. Trio (Frank Jakobsen & Olaf Kamfjord)
- 1996: Fuzzy Logic (Curling Legs)
- 2012: Romantic Notions (Curling Legs), R.K. Trio (Jan Olav Renvåg & Roger Johansen)

=== Collaborative works ===
Within Out to Lunch

- 1988: Out to Lunch (Odin Records)
- 1995: Kullboksrytter (Curling Legs)

Within Søyr

- 1987: Vectors (Hot Club Records)
- 1994: Bussene lengter hjem (Curling Legs), with Elin Rosseland
- 1997: Med kjøtt og kjærlighet (Curling Legs), with Eldbjørg Raknes
- 2001: Alene hjemme (Curling Legs)

With other projects

- 2000: I Will Wait For You (Via Music), with Elin Ødegaard
- 2006: Sundslegen, Herja Og Naken (Tylden & Co), with Lars Klevstrand, Bjørn Klakegg & Jan Olav Renvåg
- 2006: Spillegal ()
