= Astrid Kvalbein =

Norwegian soprano, music critic and musicologist

- Born: 13 October 1971 (age 54); Oslo, Norway
- Occupations: Soprano, music critic, musicologist, rector of the Norwegian Academy of Music

Astrid Kvalbein (born 13 October 1971) is a Norwegian soprano, classical music critic and musicologist, and the rector (i.e. president) of the Norwegian Academy of Music, serving since 2021.

== Career ==
Kvalbein was born in Oslo and is the daughter of the theologian Hans Kvalbein. She is both a performer and an academic musicologist. She earned her doctorate in musicology at the Norwegian Academy of Music in 2013 with a dissertation examining the work of Pauline Hall (1890–1969) as a classical composer, and subsequently worked as a senior researcher at the institution until her 2021 election as its rector, its highest office.

She is a music critic of Norway's two largest newspapers, Aftenposten and Verdens Gang.

As a performer Kvalbein has been a member of contemporary and avant-garde music groups Søyr, vonDrei (with Solveig Slettahjell and Ellen Aagaard) and asamisimasa.

== Awards ==
- Gender Equality Award of the Norwegian Association of Composers (2018)
