= Ice Music Festival =

Annual festival in Ål, Hallingdal, Norway

- Status: Active
- Genre: Glacial Music Festival
- Date: February 2021
- Begins: 26 February 2021
- Ends: 27 February 2021
- Frequency: Annually
- Location: Ål, Hallingdal
- Country: Norway
- Years active: 16
- Website: www.icemusicfestivalnorway.no

Ice Music Festival Norway (initiated 2006 in Geilo, Norway) is a "glacial instrument" festival founded by Terje Isungset together with Pål Knutsson Medhus. Isungset had the idea behind the festival and remains the creative director. The festival is unique because everything, including the venue, instruments, and art, is made of ice and snow. The last three years, the festival has been located at Finse. For 2021, the festival will for the first time be arranged at Bergsjøstølen, Ål kommune. Around 30 volunteers and students work alongside ice carvers, designers, ice cutters, architects and artists for 10 days leading up to the festival to make adequate preparations.

== Background ==
The Ice Music Festival has been an annual event since 2006, showcasing music performed on instruments made from ice. Terje Isungset is the founder of the ice music as a phenomenon, and he has been travelling around the whole world with ice music concerts since 1999. Isungset had the idea of making a festival where everyone participating must create their art using only ice and snow. This requirement allowed for a pool of creativity among musicians, dancers, and other artists. In recent years, several students from the University of Bergen have been participating in the program as well. Isungset is in charge of the record label All Ice Records, and the festival cooperates with this label in producing ice music. AIR distributes their own music on all digital platforms, and are aiming to release at least one album per year, with one release at the first full moon of each year. The festival takes place in Ål, a small village close to Hardangervidda in Norway. Since 2006, the concert venue has been moved around several times, from Geilo to Finse - and now Ål. The stages are built from scratch every year, which is a major art project completed by the students from UiB.

== Profile ==
With the ice as the foundation for the festival, the program is entirely tailored around it. Nevertheless, every version of the festival is different. Every year, a new "instrument of the year" is made. Over the years, this has included the ice-kantele, ice-didgeridoo, ice-harp, ice-udu, ice-drum, ice-balafon, ice-hardanger fiddle, tub-ice, ice-leik, ice-bass, ice-ofon, ice-trumpet, ice-horn and ice-percussion. The festival focuses strongly on music, but the festival is also meant to highlight a focus on the climate crisis, as melting icecaps is one of the clearest signs of global warming. Bjerknes Centre for Climate Research in Bergen is doing research on global warming, and the festival cooperates with scientists, who give lectures during the festival. Many various musicians have participated in the festival over the years, including Arve Henriksen, Anders Jormin‚ Miss Tati, Eirik Glambek Bøe and Sara Marielle Gaup. Complete artist overview found below. The musicians cover many different genres, from folk music and jazz to pop and R&B, and they all have different origins. Their collaboration at the Ice Music Festival creates music like no other.

== Press coverage ==
Various press from Norway and the rest of the world have visited and documented the Ice Music Festival:

Norway Bergens Tidende, Drammens Tidende, Verdens Gang, NRK, TV 2, Aftenposten, Ringerikes Blad, Bergensavisen, Hallingdølen, Radio Hallingdal‚ Hytta Vår. Europe Deutsche Welle, Die Zeit, Südwest Presse, GEO, Jazzism, BBC, BBC Music Jazz, Financial Times, The Guardian, fRoots, Jazzwise

Others HBO,

== Artists ==
2017

- Bergen Academy of Art and Design
- Ivar Kolve: Ice-percussion and ice-marimba
- Bjørn Tomren: Yodelling
- Grzegorz Piotrowsk: Ice-saxophone
- Steinar Raknes: Ice-bass
- Snorre Bjerck: Ice-percussion
- Minna Raskinen and Anita Lehtola- Tollin: Ice-kantele
- Thomas T. Dahl: Ice-guitar
- Fieh (Sofie Tollefsbøl, Ola Øverby, Andreas Rukan & Lyder Øvreås Røed): Vocals, ice-percussion, ice-bass and ice-trumpet
- Maria Skranes: Vocals and ice-percussion
- Terje Isungset: Ice-percussion

2016

- Martin Halla: Vocals
- Ivar Kolve: Ice-percussion & ice-marimba
- Kristin Voreland: Icedecoration
- Snorre Bjerck: Ice-percussion
- Jon Halvor Bjørnseth
- Maria Skranes: Vocals & ice-percussion
- Daniel Herskedal: TubIce (Ice Tuba)
- Helge Andreas Norbakken: Ice-percussion
- Trio Medieval: Anna Maria Friman, Berit Opheim, & Linn Andrea Fuglseth: Vocals
- Arve Henriksen: Ice-trumpet & improvised vocals
- Mamadou Diabate: Ice-percussion
- Miss Tati: Vocals
- Gawain Hewitt
- Johannes Lundberg: Ice-bass
- Terje Isungset: Ice-percussion

2015

- Sigurd Rotvik Tunestveit: Vocals
- Margit Myhr: Langeleik, lyre & vocals
- Steinar Mossige: Ice-percussion
- Eilif Gundersen: Ice-horn
- Sigurd Ytre-Arne: Electronics and sampling
- Trio Medieval/ Anna Maria Friman, Berit Opheim, & Linn Andrea Fuglseth: Vocals
- Terje Isungset: Ice-percussion
- Arve Henriksen:Ice-trumpet & improvised vocals
- Anders Jormin: Ice-bass
- Helge Norbakken: Ice-drums
- Jan Bang: Live sampling
- Stein Arne Rimehaug: Ice-udu
- Lena Nymark: Vocals
- Therese Skauge: Dance

2014

- Andreas Aasberg: Dance
- Eilif Gundersen: Ice-horn
- Eldbjørg Raknes: Vocals
- Frode Eggen: Telling
- Rob Waring: Iceofon
- Svante Henryson: Ice-cello
- Katarina Henryson: Vocals
- Arve Henriksen: Ice-trumpet & improvised vocals
- Anna Maria Friman: Vocals
- Sidsel Walstad: Ice-harp
- Lena Nymark: Vocals
- Bill Covitz: Instrument-maker
- Terje Isungset: Ice-percussion

2013

- Arve Henriksen: Ice-trumpet & improvised vocals
- Hilmar Jensson: Ice-guitar and electronics
- Lena Willemark: Vocals
- Leo Svensson Sander: Ice-cello
- Terje Isungset: Ice-percussion

2012

2011

- Aastad Bråten: Ice-langeleik (Norwegian folk music instrument)
- Solfrid Nestegard Gjeldokk: Vocals
- Bram Stadhouders: Ice-guitar and electronics
- Fatma Sidan: Vocals
- Mari Kvien Brunvoll: Vocals and ice-langeleik
- Terje Isungset: Ice-percussion

2010

- Helene Bøksle: Vocals
- Sidsel Walstad: Ice-harp
- Lena Nymark: Vocals
- Sofia Breimo and Johannes Blomquist: Performance
- Terje Isungset: Ice-percussion

2009

- Sidsel Walstad: Ice-harp
- Lena Nymark: Vocals
- St. Hallvard-guttene: Boys Choir
- Flukt: Art/dancing
- Helene Bøksle: Vocals
- Nils Økland: Ice-fiddle
- Vinterdvale: Sami duet
- Sara Marielle Gaup: Joik
- Terje Isungset: Ice-percussion

2008

- Karin Park: Vocals
- David Park
- Karl Seglem: Ice-horn
- Eilif Gundersen: Ice-horns
- Peter Paelinck: Ice-didgeridoo
- Peter Wasilewski
- Eldgrim Springgard: Theater
- Ann Beate Skavhaug: Visual arts
- Iris Almås Tangeraas: Dance
- Sara Marielle Gaup: Joik
- Terje Isungset: Ice-percussion

2007

- Anneli Drecker: Vocals
- Espen Jørgensen: Ice-guitars
- Stefan Marb: Dance
- Lars Inge Tverberg
- Per Jørgensen: Ice-trumpet and vocals
- Märtha Louise: Storytelling
- Carlos Negreiros, Robertinho Silva, Lidia Pinheiro, Lasaro Insquierdo Gomes, Ceilo de Caravalho: Ice-percussion and dancing
- Therese Skauge: Dancing
- Terje Isungset: Ice-percussion

2006

- Unni Løvlid: Vocals
- Sidsel Endresen: Vocals
- Children from local school: Ice-percussion
- Terje Isungset: Ice-percussion
