= Vislie =

Vislie is a surname. Notable people with the surname include:

- Jon Vislie (1896–1945), Norwegian lawyer
- Vetle Vislie (1858–1933), Norwegian educationalist
