= Kaare Filseth =

Norwegian newspaper editor

Kaare Krabbe Filseth (24 April 1901 – 19 September 1944) was a Norwegian newspaper editor who was killed during the occupation of Norway by Nazi Germany.

== Biography ==
He was born in Lillehammer. His father Johan Filseth (1862–1927) hailed from Romedal and his mother Laura Krabbe (1879–1969) from Copenhagen, Denmark. After taking his examen artium he was hired as sub-editor for the newspaper Gudbrandsdølen in 1920. His father was a former editor-in-chief of that newspaper. Kaare Filseth remained in his position until 1931, except for a year from 1923 to 1924, when he worked as a secretary for the League of Nations information department in Geneva. In 1934 in Oslo he married a woman from Hønefoss. They had one child. In 1938 Filseth became editor-in-chief of the Hønefoss-based newspaper Ringerikes Blad.

Filseth's sub-editor in Ringerikes Blad since 1938 was Oskar Hasselknippe. Hasselknippe was an active resistance member during the occupation of Norway by Nazi Germany; it has been said that he did "more secret work than newspaper work". In 1943, the same year he became district commander in Milorg, Hasselknippe left Ringerikes Blad. Filseth was repeatedly asked by German authorities to reveal information about Hasselknippe, but feigned ignorance and covered for him every time.

One day, resistance members under the leadership of Hasselknippe, but with orders from more highly placed Milorg officers, blew up the command central of the State Police in Ringerike. Martial law was declared, and Filseth was taken hostage, selected among the populace of Hønefoss. Hostages during the occupation were taken as retaliation of resistance acts. Hostages did not necessarily have any connection to the matter at hand, but were mostly family, friends or townspeople of the suspected perpetrators. Filseth was shot in the staircase of his own home. He was buried in Hønefoss.

His sister Tove Filseth (1905–1994) was a journalist. She was married to Silesian Jewish writer Max Tau from May 1944 to his death in 1976 and physician Haakon Natvig from 1988. Another sister Aase Filseth was married to Carl Ferdinand Gjerdrum, who was executed during the war. His brother Tyge Filseth was a marketer.
