= Carl Ferdinand Gjerdrum (barrister) =

Norwegian resistance member

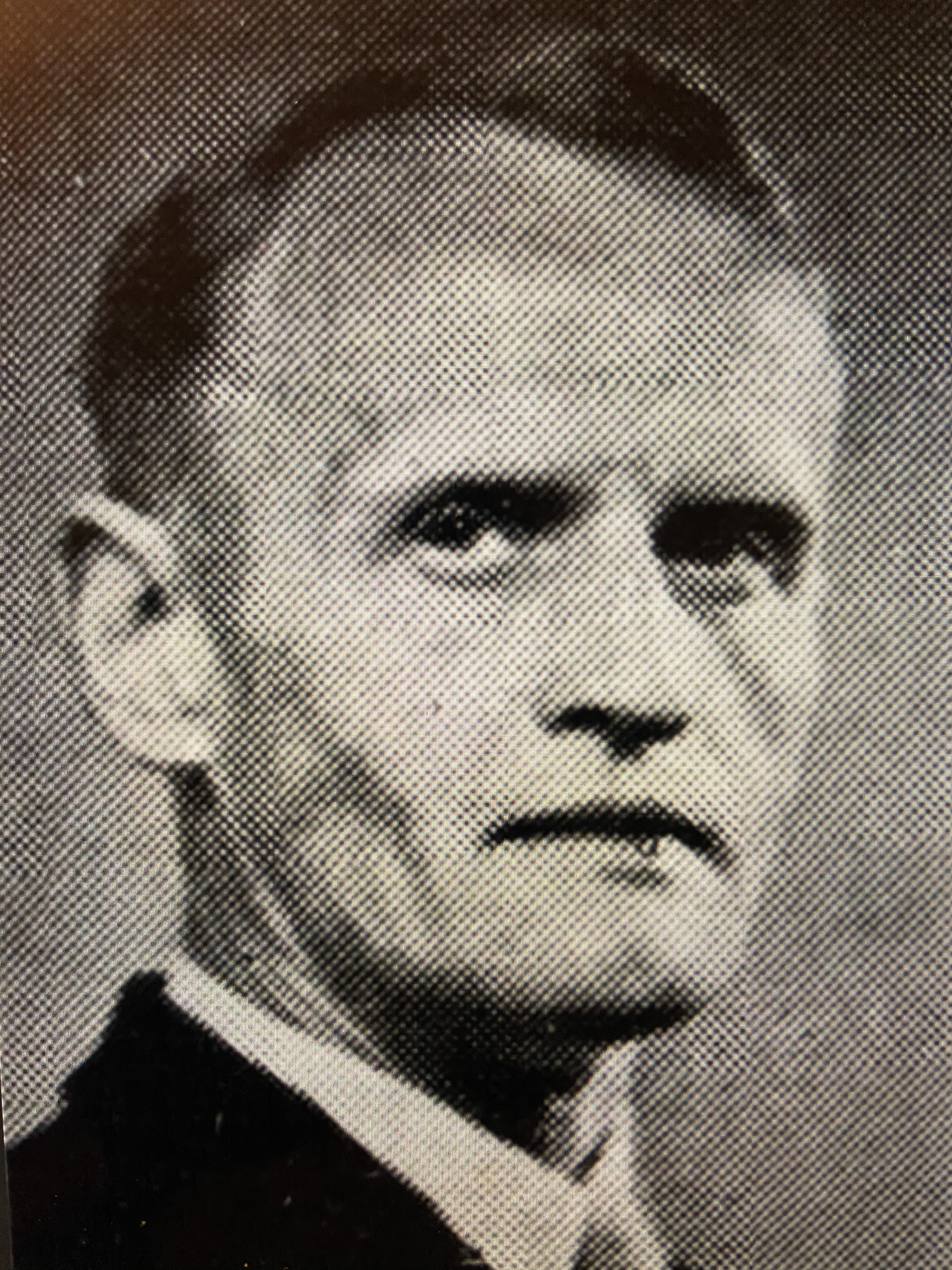
Headshot of Carl Ferdinand Gjerdrum

Carl Ferdinand Gjerdrum (9 April 1898 – 9 February 1945) was a Norwegian jurist and resistance member.

He was born in Kristiania as a son of Albert Gjerdrum and Olivia Kloumann. He was a grandson of Carl Ferdinand Gjerdrum, grandnephew of Jørgen Gjerdrum and Otto Gjerdrum and great-grandson of Ole Gjerdrum. In 1926 in Lillehammer he married Aase Filseth, of Danish descent, a sister of Tyge and Kaare Filseth.

By occupation Carl Ferdinand Gjerdrum was a barrister, a lawyer with access to Supreme Court cases, like his father. The law firm was named A. Gjerdrum og C. F. Gjerdrum, and had its offices in the Oslo's main street Karl Johans gate.

During the occupation of Norway by Nazi Germany he was involved in a broad spectrum of work for the Norwegian resistance movement. He supplied resistance members with faux passports and helped them cross the border to neutral Sweden, he was involved in intelligence gathering, in the illegal press and with unveiling Norwegian denouncers. When the Nazi police leader Karl Marthinsen was assassinated by the Norwegian resistance on 8 February 1945, Gjerdrum was arrested together with thirty-three others, including Kaare Sundby, Haakon Sæthre and Jon Vislie, as a reprisal. At Akershus Fortress Gjerdrum was executed by gunshot on 9 February.
