= Agbaland =

Norwegian musical trio

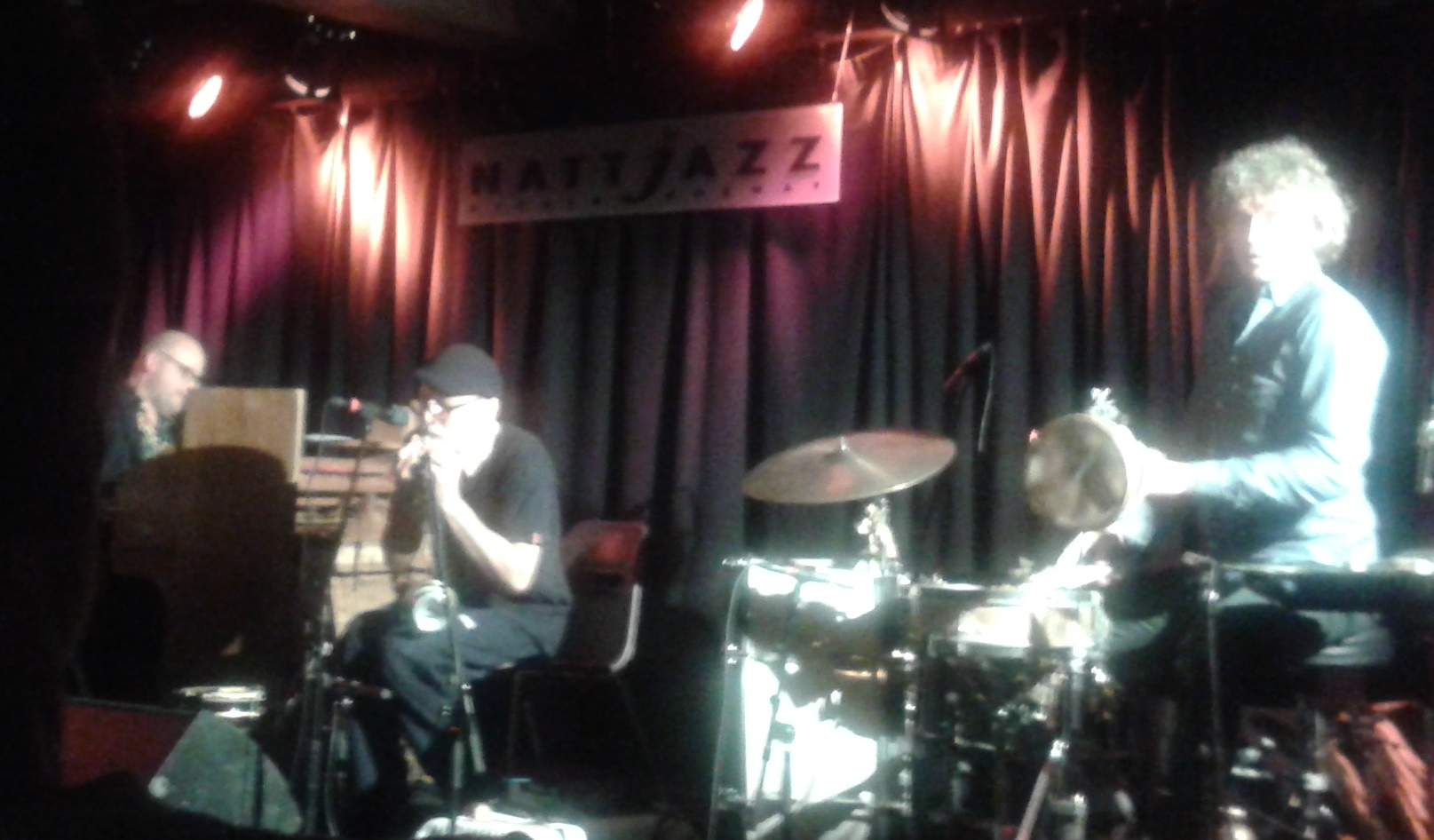
- Agbaland at Nattjazz May 30, 2015.

Background information
- Origin: Bergen, Norway
- Genres: Jazz
- Years active: 2012-
- Members: Per Jørgensen; Sigbjørn Apeland; Terje Isungset

Agbaland (initiated 2012 in Bergen, Norway) is a Norwegian trio comprising the veterans Terje Isungset and Per Jørgensen expanding their duo project 'Agbalagba Daada' with the organist Sigbjørn Apeland, known from his works with Berit Opheim 1982.

== Biography ==
Agbaland approaches the music in a playful manner giving the audience a sense that anything can happen, whether it is wild and noisy, or meditative and ceremonial. Terje Isungset is among the world's most creative and innovative percussionist, and has in recent years been working a lot with ice as a material for musical instrument. Per Jørgensen appears at the Nattjazz festival in many gigs, with a career ranging from solo guitar within Bergen Blues Band, to trumpet and vocal within the trio JøKleBa and the Magnetic North Orchestra.

== Band members ==
- Per Jørgensen - trumpet, vocals, percussion
- Sigbjørn Apeland - keyboards
- Terje Isungset - drums, percussion
