= Oskar Hasselknippe =

Norwegian newspaper editor

Oskar Hasselknippe (18 January 1911 – 4 July 2001) was a Norwegian newspaper editor. He is known for his work in the Norwegian resistance movement and as editor of Verdens Gang during its swift ascent among Norwegian newspapers.

== Early life and World War II ==
Hasselknippe was born in Biri as a son of car mechanic Lars Hasselknippe (1891–1946) and Paula Elvestad (1889–1979). He finished his secondary education in 1931, and worked as a journalist in Velgeren until 1938 (with interruptions while undergoing pilot training with the Royal Norwegian Navy Air Service and at civilian air schools), and then as subeditor in Ringerikes Blad. When World War II reached Norway on 9 April 1940, with the German invasion, Hasselknippe fought for Norway as a lieutenant in the engineer corps. When the battles were over, Hasselknippe joined Milorg. He also got married in 1940, to technician Jenny Hansen (1907–1979). Besides Milorg resistance work, he continued in Ringerikes Blad.

Hasselknippe's main task was to receive and distribute weapons, ammunition, and supplies dropped in the forest by aircraft. He operated in the Ringerike district, as well as in Hallingdal, Krokskogen, and Hadeland. Hasselknippe eventually became wanted by the German occupiers of Norway. His editor-in-chief in Ringerikes Blad, Kaare Filseth, covered for him, but was ultimately seized as a hostage and shot by the Germans. Hasselknippe went into hiding and survived, and was district commander for Milorg from 1943 to 1945. He was decorated with the British King's Medal for Courage.

== Later career ==
After the war, some members of the Norwegian Home Front discussed a restart of the newspaper Tidens Tegn, but this did not go through. Instead a new newspaper with roots in the Home Front was created: Verdens Gang. He was subeditor during the initial economic hardships, and in 1953 he was promoted to co-editor alongside Christian A. R. Christensen. In 1967 Vegard Sletten succeeded Christensen, and between 1969 and 1974 Arne Bonde sat as a third editor. Hasselknippe stepped down in 1978, and was succeeded by Tim Greve with Andreas Norland as co-editor.

The newspaper grew influential, and has been the largest in Norway since 1981. In 1963 it was first in Norway to adopt the tabloid format, and contrary to Christian A. R. Christensen, Hasselknippe was a proponent of this modernization, and also of the introduction of VG as the commonly used name for the newspaper. He also chaired the Oslo branch of the Association of Norwegian Editors from 1972 to 1977.

Hasselknippe had a sense for technological innovation and sound economic administration. He supported several entrepreneurs, including Vebjørn Tandberg, Olav Selvaag and Ludvig G. Braathen. He died in July 2001 in Oslo.
