= Tyge Filseth =

Norwegian marketing agent

Tyge Krabbe Filseth (1913 – 2 September 2002) was a Norwegian marketing agent, known for co-founding two research institutions related to advertising.

He was a son of Johan Filseth, the 1894 founder and editor-in-chief of newspaper Gudbrandsdølen. His brother Kaare Filseth was the editor-in-chief of Ringerikes Blad from 1938 to his death in 1944. His sister Tove Filseth was a journalist, and was married to Silesian Jewish writer Max Tau from May 1944 to his death in 1976 and physician Haakon Natvig from 1988 to her death in 1994. His wife's uncle was Nikolai Astrup.

He graduated from Copenhagen Business School in 1934, and worked in the advertising agencies Fabritius and B.A.B. before being hired at the newly established Norwegian School of Economics and Business Administration in 1936. From 1938 to 1940 he chaired the Institute of Sale and Advertising there. In 1958 he co-founded the Institute of Marketing (Institutt for Markedsføring). It was modelled on the English Institute of Practitioners in Advertising, and owned by the Norwegian Association of Advertising Agencies. The institute was incorporated into the Norwegian School of Marketing (Norges Markedshøyskole) in 1989, which was in turn affiliated with the Norwegian School of Management from 1992.

Filseth was married to Henninge Astrup and had three sons (Per, Frode and Kåre). He died in September 2002 in Oslo.
