= Tuva Halse =

Norwegian musician

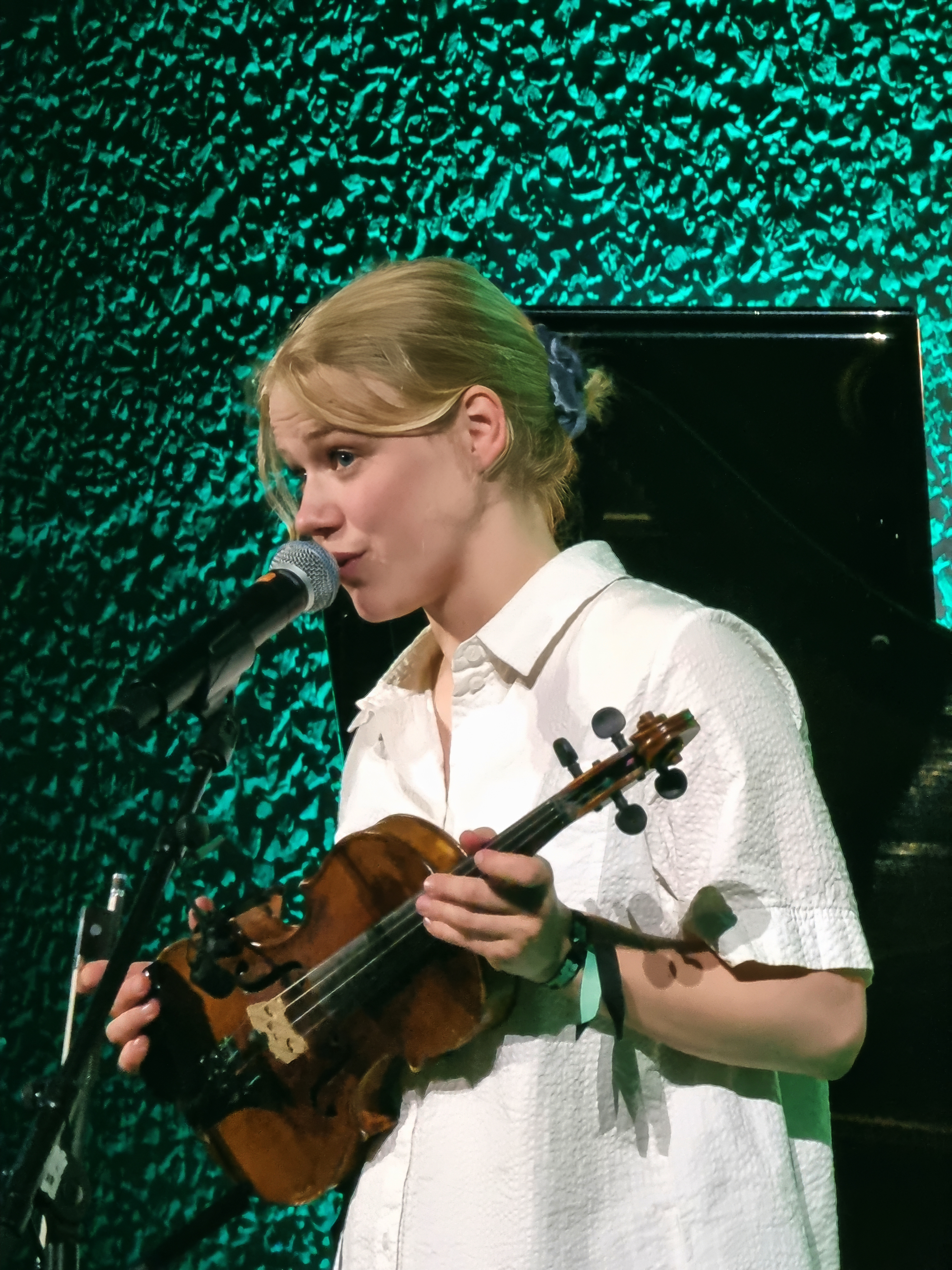
- Tuva Halse at Moldejazz 2025
- Born: August 9, 1999 (age 27); Molde
- Education: Jazzlinja at NTNU, Trondheim; Norwegian Academy of Music, Oslo
- Style: Jazz, Improvised music
- Website: www.tuvahalse.com

Tuva Halse (born 1999 in Molde, Norway) is an instrumentalist, composer, arranger and vocalist known for her lyrical jazz improvisations on violin, her refined melodic compositions, and as a founding member of the Fjordgata Records label.

== Biography ==
Tuva Karen Halse was born in Molde in 1999. She studied at the Bekkevoll Junior High School, then the Molde High School, and simultaneously followed the music programme of the Molde kulturskole. She composes music since childhood. She turned to jazz violin when Arne Torvik, her piano teacher since the age of 13, introduced her to jazz, and encouraged her to play it on the violin. He also drew her attention to the music of Mathias Eick. Listening to Ola Kvernberg at Moldejazz in 2016 was also a decisive experience which initiated her interest in jazz music, showing the diversity of ways a violin can be used. One of her first experiences with a jazz orchestra was with the Lærlingan, a big band of Molde high school students led by Rolf Magnus Orø with which she played for instance at Moldejazz in 2017. Halse claims a musical lineage with Adam Bałdych, and cited him as the musician who ultimately motivated her to become the musician who she is. Halse cited Chet Baker, Kenny Wheeler, Pat Metheny, Ola Kvernberg and Arne Torvik as other influences. She defines herself as a melancholic musician playing "mountain jazz", and says that she "feels at home" in the complex Nordic jazz idiom.

== Career ==
Tuva Halse entered the Jazzlinja, a jazz training of the Conservatory in Trondheim at the Norwegian University of Science and Technology (NTNU) in 2019, where she met many of the musicians she would go on to work with in the next several years. She completed her bachelor's degree at NTNU in 2022. At the Jazzlinja, Halse was part of the Magellan band, which toured in Norway in 2021 with the suite In Search Of. She obtained her Master of Music in Performance from the Norwegian Academy of Music in Oslo in 2025.

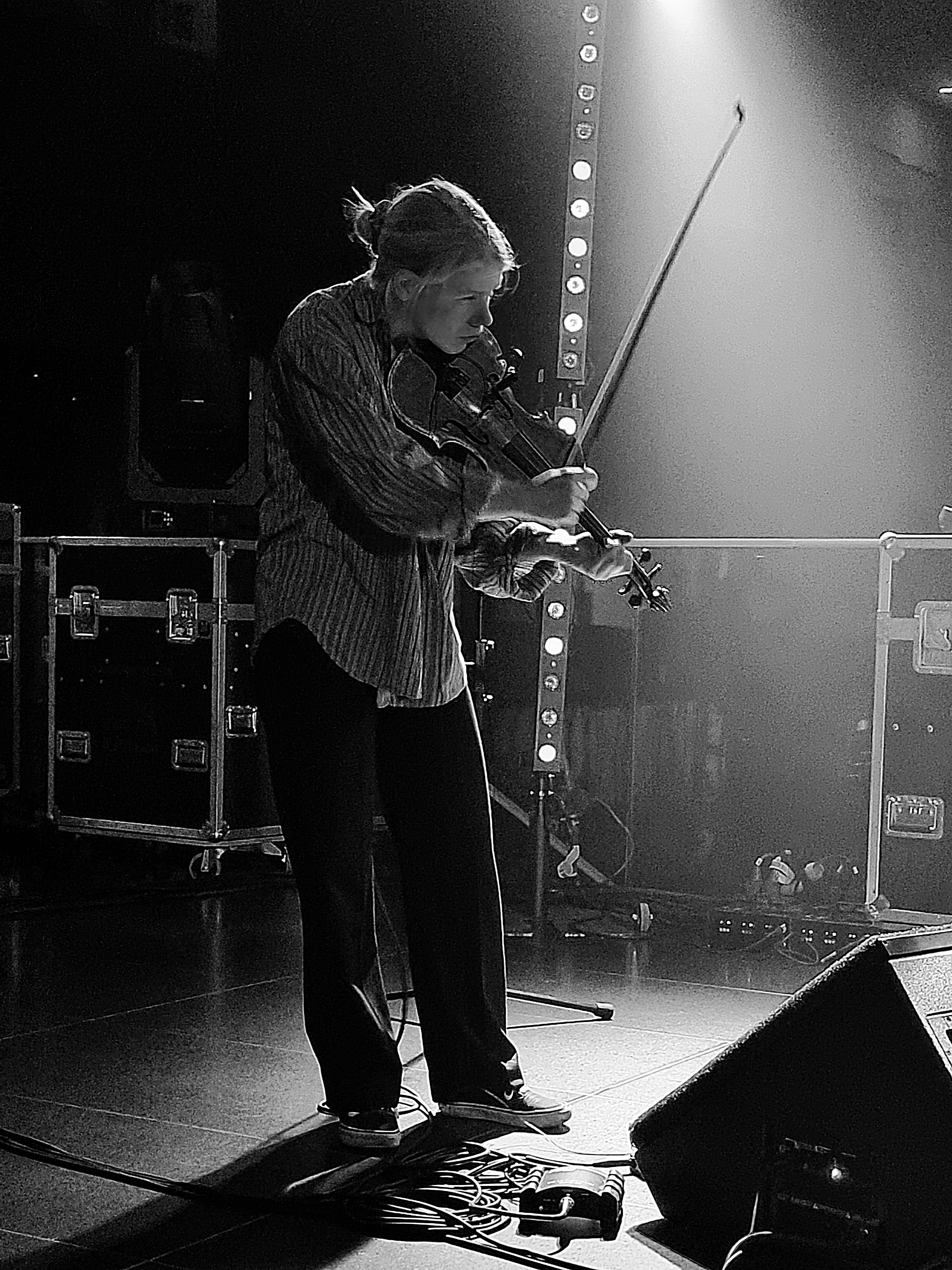
Tuva Halse at Jazztopad Festival, Wrocław (2023)

The violin sound of Tuva Halse bears a strong classical music imprint, and is described by Tor Hammerø as having a light, bright, and highly transparent tone. Her improvisations are often described as lyrical and focus a lot of energy. Torkjell Hovland writes that she "creates spaces in the music" and "is concerned with the energy in pauses between the notes as much as the notes themselves". Halse is a multifarious artist who now pursues a career as an improviser, composer, arranger, band leader, and soloist; she has been invited or selected to participate in a large number of groups in the fields of jazz, folk, pop, rap and contemporary music. She is also active as a studio musician and in high school student training.

Tuva Halse develops her own projects, including the praised Bento Box Trio (Boxed, Somehow I Lost My Way), Tuva Halse Quintet (Two), and tuvahalseband (nemesis/cruel). Simultaneously, she contributes to many others on the Norwegian scene, including the Miriam Kibakaya Concept, Leon Røsten, the group of laureates Melting Pot, the Alex Ventling's Wavemakers, and OJKOS. She occasionally plays solo concerts and duets (with Mathias Eick, Tord Gustavsen, Peter Knudsen, Arne Torvik) and Morten Georg Gismervik.

In 2024 she toured with the quartet of Sverre Gjørvad and Ensemble Noor, and participated to the Trondheim Jazz Orchestra in a tour for a joint composition with the I LIKE TO SLEEP trio. The creation of the Reconnection suite for the OJKOS jazz ensemble at the Nasjonal jazzscene in November 2024 firmly established Tuva Halse as a leading jazz composer and arranger for large ensembles. In 2025, with Miriam Venås (vocals) she opened the Molde Jazz Festival, traditionally conceived as a jazz service at Molde Cathedral. A guest at the concert by renowned Norwegian singer Thomas Dybdahl at this festival, her performance was seen as its highlight. The premiere of Air Music, a commission from the Kongsberg Jazzfestival created with her quintet featuring guest jazz saxophonist and classical singer Håkon Kornstad, was a noted tribute to Baroque composers. The improvised duet between Tuva Halse and Joshua Redman during the Trondheim Jazz Orchestra concert under the direction of Eirik Hegdal in Oslo unanimously impressed critics, who saw it as a moment to go down in history. The same year she went on release tours as a member of Trond Kallevåg's group (Minnesota, one of the All About Jazz's 2025 highlights), Alex Ventling's Wavemakers (Wavemakers), and Fred Warnby's group I LOST MY LASER! (Laserism, where she plays electric violin). As part of OJKOS, she was invited by L'Autre Collectif to tour France with these two orchestras in September 2025, a tour captured on the album In the Yard.

The second album of the Tuva Halse Quintet, Reconnection, was featured in The Best Jazz on Bandcamp (January 2026) and the Europe Jazz Media Chart (February 2026).

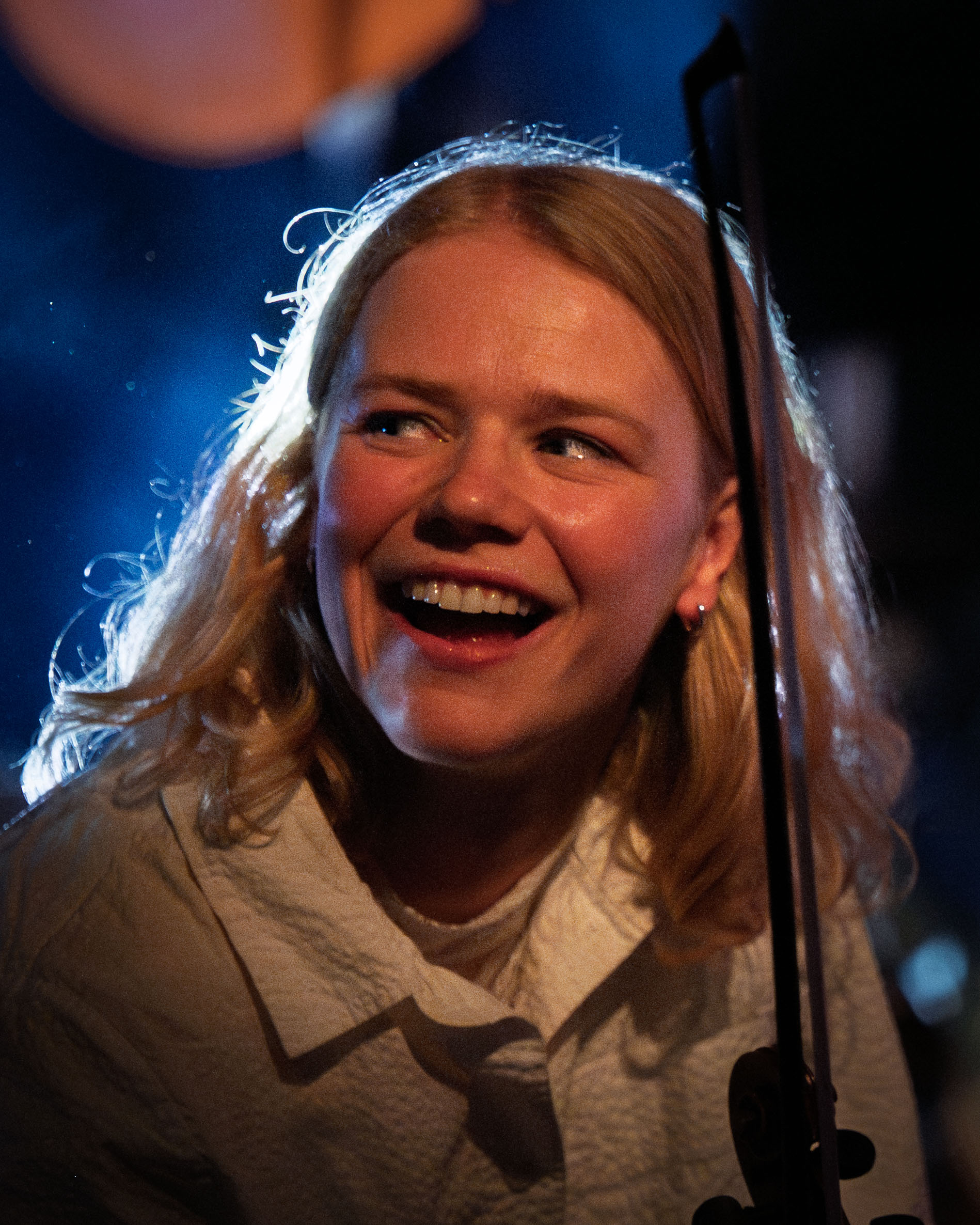
Tuva Halse at Kongsberg Jazzfestival (2025)

== Fjordgata records ==
Tuva Halse is one of the founding members of Fjordgata Records, an independent music label established in 2021.

== Discography ==
=== As a leader ===
- Boxed - Live at Dokkhuset, Bento Box Trio, Fjordgata Records (2022)
- Two, Tuva Halse Quintet, Jazzland Recordings (2023)
- nemesis/cruel, tuvahalseband, Fjordgata Records (2024)
- Somehow I Lost My Way, Bento Box Trio (with Mats Eilertsen and Sissel Vera Pettersen), Fjordgata Records (2024)
- Reconnection, Tuva Halse Quintet, Jazzland Recordings (2026)
- the birds & the sun, tuvahalseband, Fjordgata Records (2026)

=== As a co-leader ===
- Demring - November - I Puste (Singles) Duets with Ingrid Vingen Sunde (2018)

=== As a group member ===
- Roots, Miriam Kibakaya Concept, Jazzland Recordings (2023)
- I Could Even Try To Change Your Mind, Røsten (Leon Røsten), Spupz Night Crab Life (2023)
- Minnesota, Trond Kallevåg, Hubro (2025)
- Laserism (Live in Angered), I LOST MY LASER!, Laser Records (2025)
- Wavemakers, Wavemakers (Alex Ventling), Particular Recordings Collective (2025)
- Vivid Dreams, Røsten, Fosskok Records (2026)
- In The Yard, L'Autre Ensemble & OJKOS, Autres Records (2026)

=== As a sidemusician ===
- Information Therapy, Jonas Ledang, Øra Fonogram (2020)
- Sara Fjeldvær, Sara Fjeldvær, Fjordgata Records (2021)
- The Heart Is A Lonely Hunter, Jonas Ledang, Øra Fonogram (2022)
- We Don't Imagine Anymore, Vestemøy Narvesen, Jazzland Recordings (2023)
- After The Rain, Mathias Angelhus, Øra Fonogram (2023)
- she stole my art, Audun (Audun Rørmark), Fjordgata Records (EP, 2024)
- Stars, Sara Fjeldvær, Fjordgata Records (2024)
- Reimaginations, Peter Knudsen, Skaleidoscope Music (2024)
- Intergalloptic Roundtrip, PHØNIX, Sonic Transmissions Records (2024)
- Hvor du kommer fra, Tobias Rønnevig, Boden Records (2024)
- A very merry Christmas (Live from Britannia Hotel), Liv Ellen, Øra Fonogram (2024)
- FRIHET I LENKER, Marstein, Def Jam Recordings Norway (2024)
- audun, Audun (Audun Rørmark), Fjordgata Records (2025)
- Circumspect, Sanyu (Sanyu Christine Nsubuga), Overdue (2026)
- Starfall (Invited soloist), Morten Georg Gismervik, Purple Theory Records (2026)
- Dance With The Ghosts III, David Six, Sessionwork Records (2026)

== Documentary film ==
- TUVA, by Nadia Kukankova (2024): official selection of the Nordic/Docs Documentary Film Festival 2024

== Awards ==
=== Talent prizes ===
- Drømmstipend (2017)
- Talentstipend, Handelsbanken (2019)
- TEFT-stipend, Sparebanken Møre (2022)
- Talentstipend, Sparebanken SMN (2022)
- #huninvesterer scholarship, DNB/Kongsberg Jazzfestival (2024)

=== Competitions ===
- Jazzintro finalist (Bento Box Trio), Molde International Jazz Festival (2022)
- Selected to represent Norway as a Melting Pot artist (2023)
- Selected as a member of the OJKOS Orchestra for Jazz Composers (2023)
- Selected as an NTNU Ambassador (starting in 2024)
- Nominated for the EDVARD Award in the Challenger (Urfordrer) category for nemesis/cruel of the Norwegian performing rights corporation (2025)
