= Aquilonis =

Studio album by Trio Mediæval
- Released: November 21, 2014
- Recorded: June 2014
- Studios: Propstei Sankt Gerold; Sankt Gerold, Austria
- Genres: Choral, medieval classical music and Norwegian folk music
- Length: 1:00:52
- Label: ECM New Series 2416
- Producer: Manfred Eicher

Trio Mediæval chronology
A Worcester Ladymas (2011)	Aquilonis (2014)	Rímur (2017)

Professional ratings
Review scores
Source	Rating
All Music	4/5 stars

Aquilonis (Latin "of the North Wind") is a classical and choral studio album by the Swedish trio Trio Mediæval recorded in June 2014 and released on the ECM New Series November that same year.

== Composition ==
The album is named after a Swedish North Wind. On this album the trio sings Icelandic chant and Italian sacred songs, with performing custom arrangements from old Norwegian folk melodies. The trio also sings some 15th-century English carols, as well as contemporary works by Anders Jormin, William Brooks and Andrew Smith. It's the first time that the trio also plays instruments with their voice on a record.

== Reception ==
James Manheim in his review for All Music says that "This certainly isn't an authentic performance of medieval music." but, he add that "In a way, it gets listeners closer than almost anybody else to the time when vertical sonorities in European music were new, and for those who have never heard it, it's time to begin."

In The New York Times' Classical Top Music Recordings of 2014, James R. Oestreich says that "So varied are the sources that it is hard to find a theme or even a common thread. But the enchanting vocal style and sonority that the female trio has evolved unifies the whole beautifully."

== Track listing ==
No.	Title	Writer(s)	Length
1.	"Vespers Reponsory"	Anonymous	2:44
2.	"Ama"	Anders Jormin	2:47
3.	"Ave rex angelorum"	Anonymous	2:15
4.	"Ecce quod natura mutat sua jura"	Anonymous	4:42
5.	"Ave Maris Stella"	Andrew Smith	2:32
6.	"Vespers Antiphon and Psalm I, II, III"	Anonymous	7:12
7.	"Ioseph fili David"	Andrew Smith	2:37
8.	"Ave Regina caelorum"	Andrew Smith	1:35
9.	"Alleluia: A Newë Work"	Anonymous	4:47
10.	"Morgonljos"	Linn Andrea Fuglseth & Anna Maria Friman	1:19
11.	"Vespers Antiphon and Psalm IV, V"	Anonymous	3:32
12.	"Fammi cantar l'amor"	Anonymous	2:49
13.	"Gud unde oss her al leve så"	Traditional	1:56
14.	"Benedicti e llaudati"	Anonymous	4:40
15.	"Klokkeljom"	Berit Opheim, Anna Maria Friman & Linn Andrea Fuglseth	0:47
16.	"Special Antiphon"	Anonymous	1:55
17.	"Ingen vinner frem til den evige ro"	Traditional	5:04
18.	"Fryd dig, di Kristi brud"	Traditional	3:34
19.	"I hamrinum"	Berit Opheim & Anna Maria Friman	1:00
20.	"Vale, dulcis amice"	William Brooks	3:05
Total length:			1:00:52

== Personnel ==
=== Trio Mediæval ===
- Anna Maria Friman – voice, Hardanger fiddle, melody chimes
- Linn Andrea Fuglseth – voice, portable organ, melody chimes
- Berit Opheim – voice, melody chimes
