= Terje Isungset =

Norwegian drummer (born 1964)

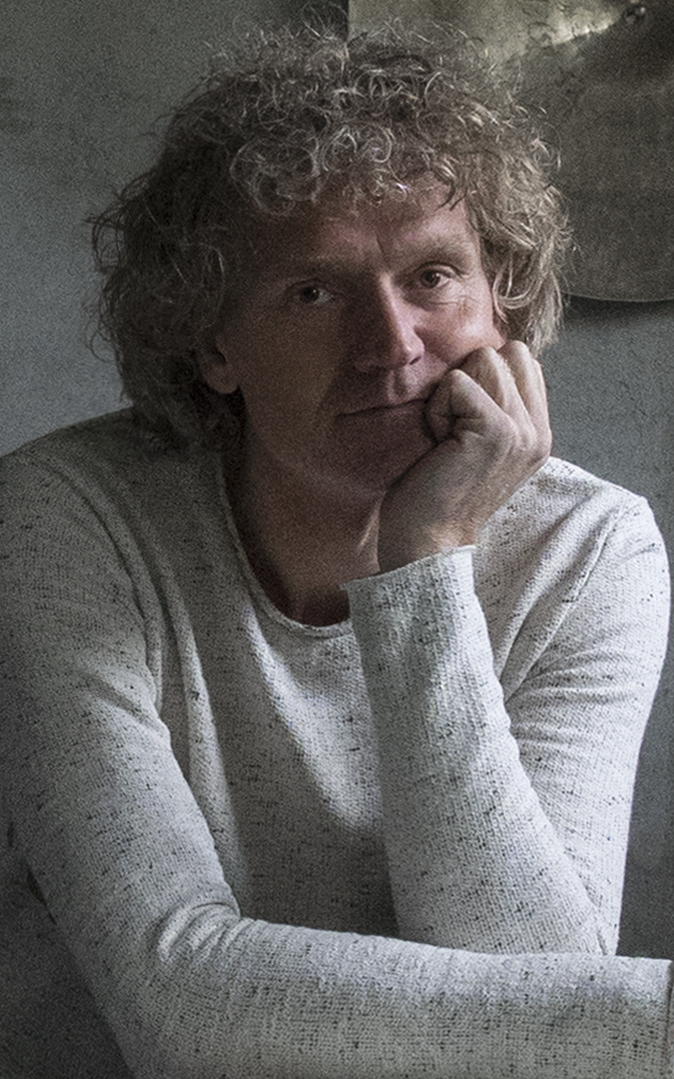

Background information
- Born: 4 May 1964 (age 62); Hol, Norway
- Genres: Jazz, Nordic folk
- Occupation: Musician
- Instrument: Drums
- Website: terjeisungset.no

Terje Isungset (born 4 May 1964) is a Norwegian drummer. From his background in jazz and traditional Scandinavian music, he has designed musical instruments from non-traditional materials, including ice.

== Career ==
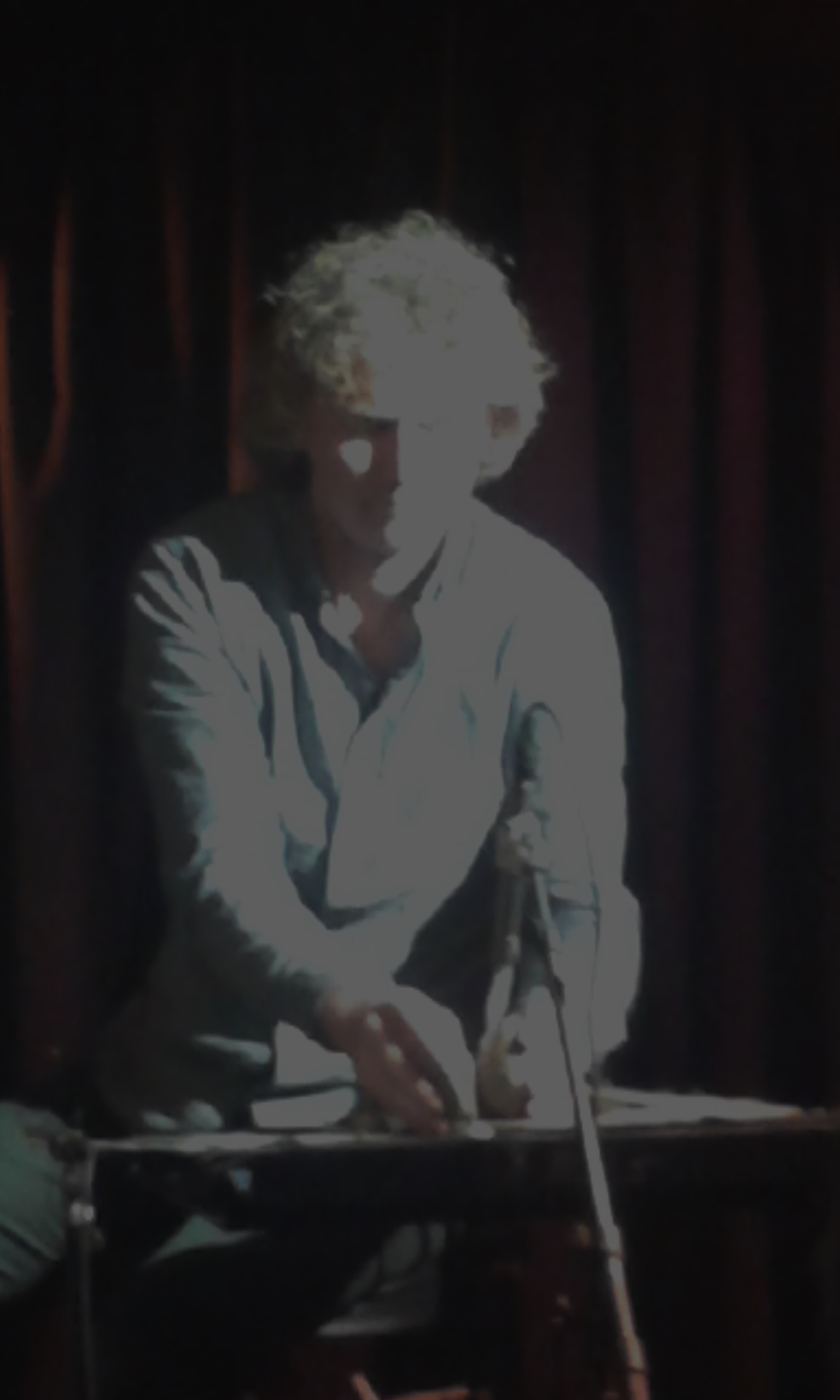
Isungset with Agbaland at Nattjazz, 30 May 2015

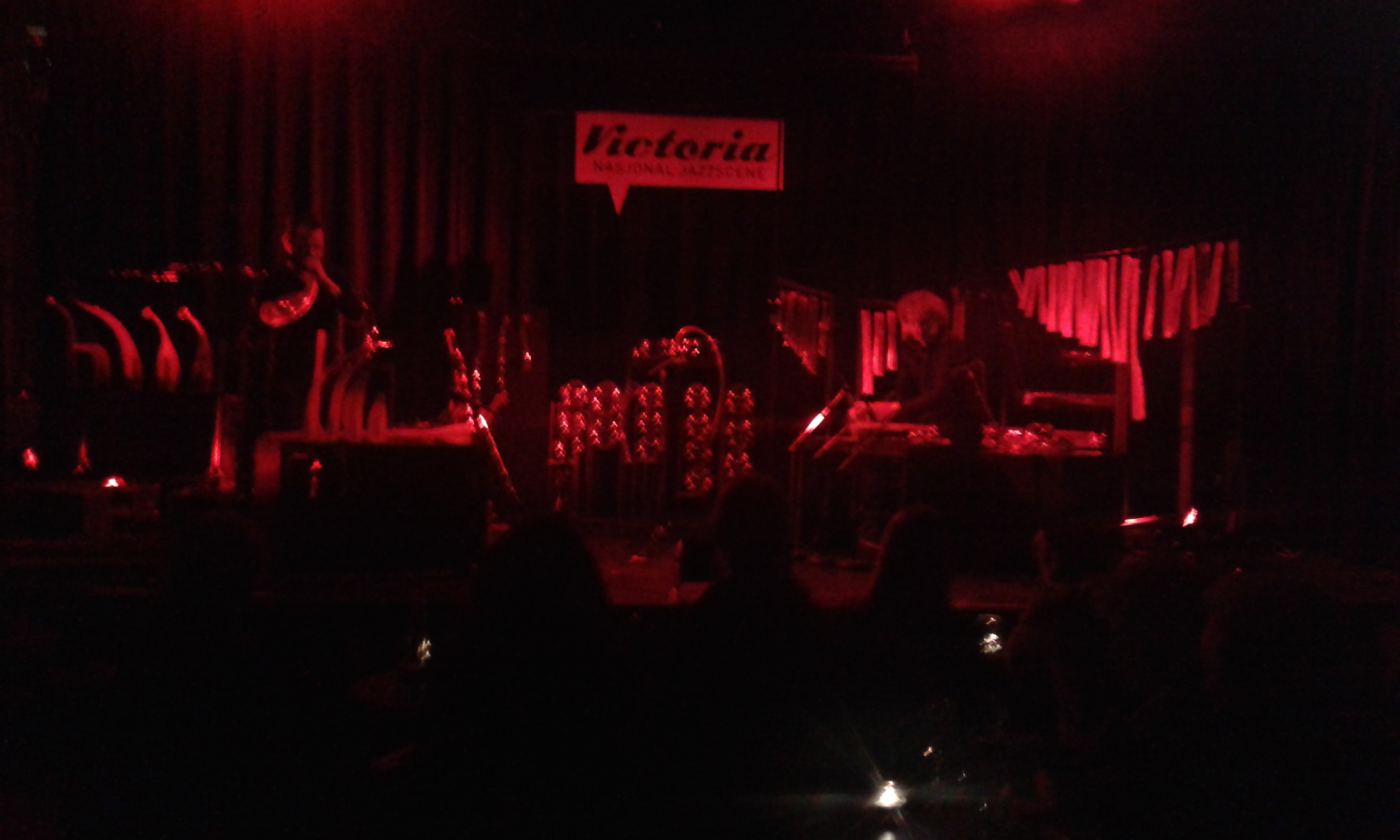
Isungset and Arve Henriksen performing glass music at Victoria, 2015

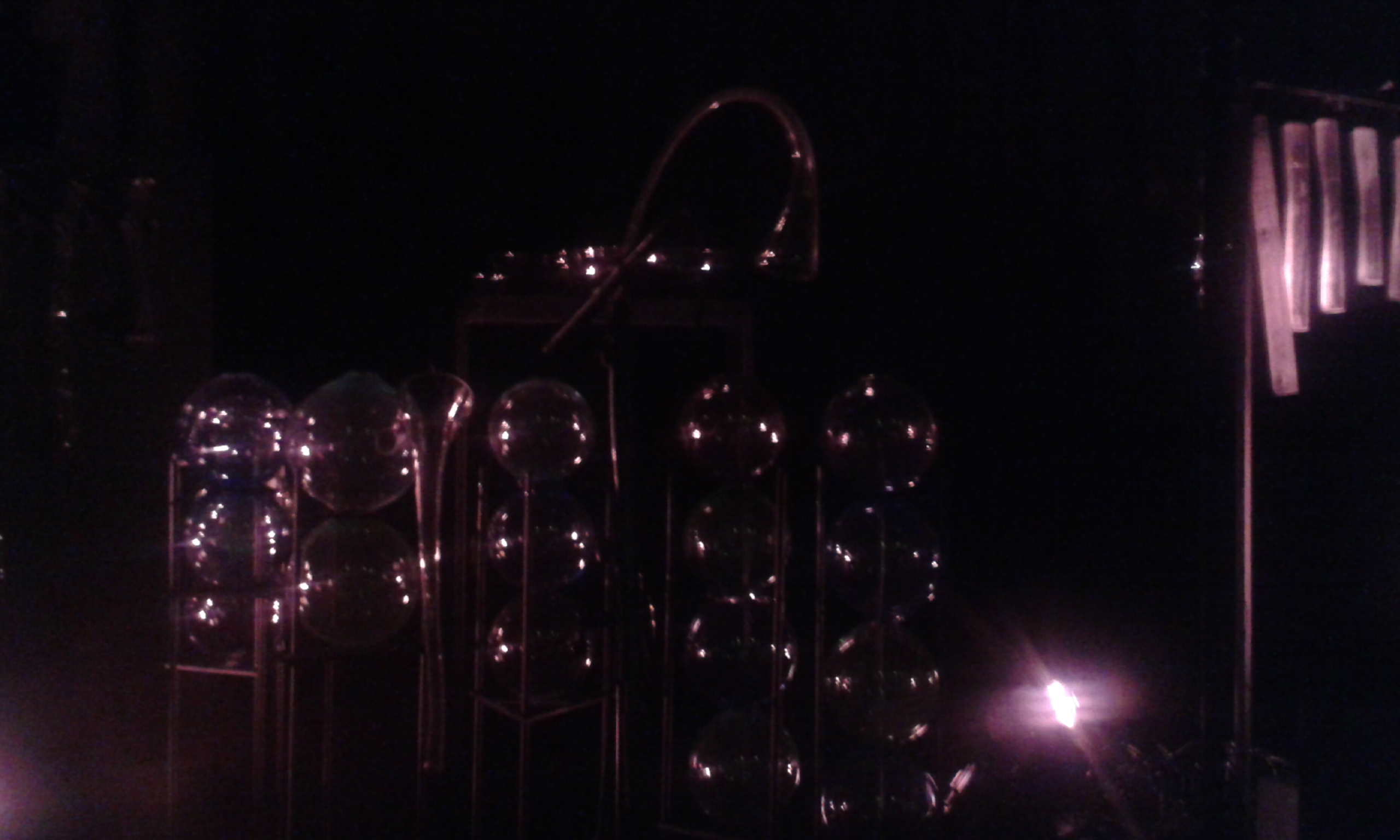
Isungset with glass drums at Victoria, December 2015

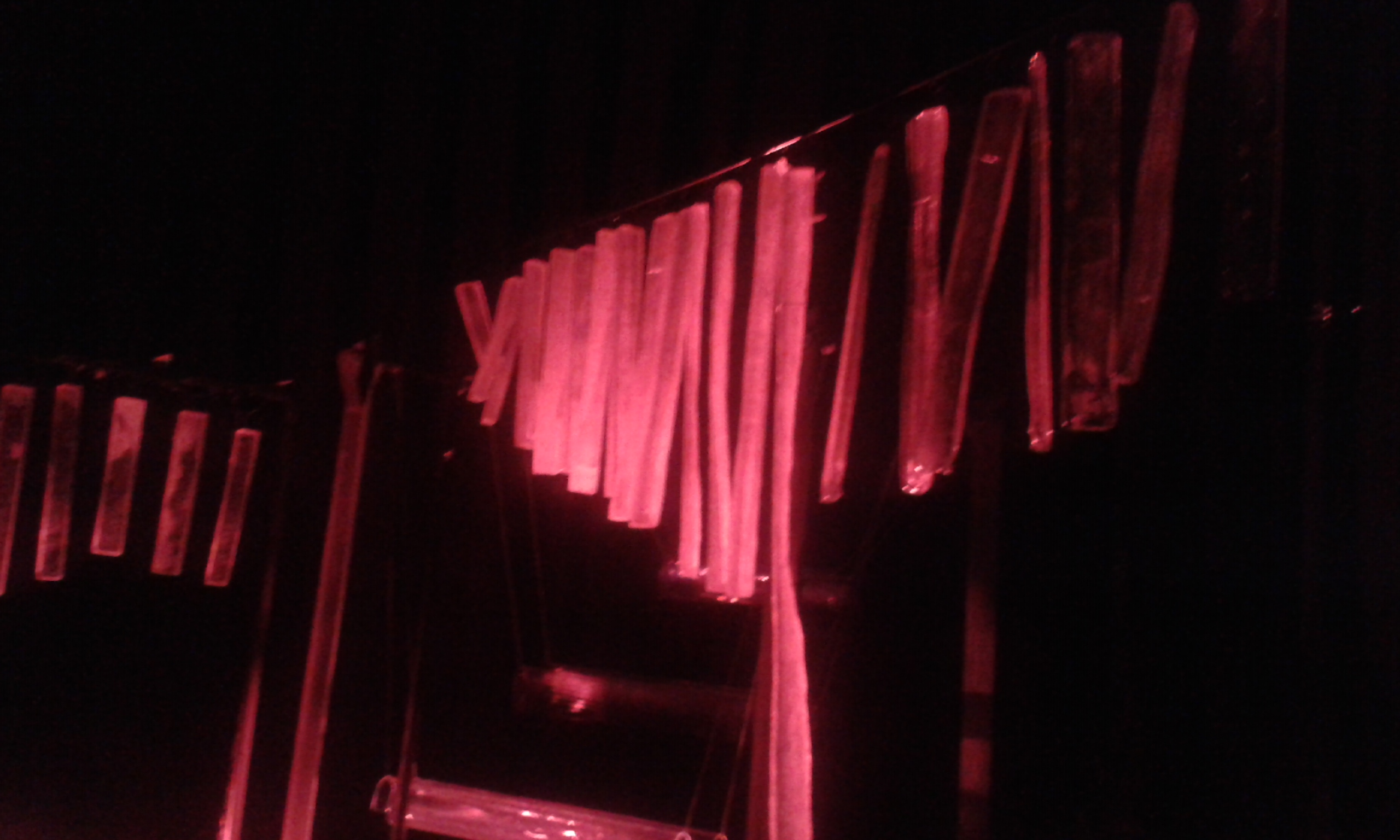
Isungset with glass instruments at Victoria, December 2015

Isungset was raised in Geilo where he played traditional dance music with his father (accordion) during his high school days. Moving to Bergen in 1984 led him to be a popular member of a number of Bergen groups, such as Ictus and Tordenskjolds soldater (1984–85), Growl and Gruv (1984-88), Saksbehandlerne and Night and Day (1985–86), Salsa Pati (1985–87), and Supply (1985–88), in addition to periods within the Big Band Emanon from 1986, and his recording debut Amalgamation (1985) with Kenneth Sivertsen.

After more than two decades on the jazz scene, Isungset has been celebrated as one of Europe's most accomplished and innovative percussionists. With more than 25 years experience in jazz and Scandinavian traditional music he raises these narrow forms of music beyond their traditional boundaries, becoming more like a crossover between a sound artist and shaman. When crafting his own instruments from natural elements, specifically from his home country Norway, from such as arctic birch, granite, slate, sheep bells and even ice, he is highly recommended to those sensible to the poetry and simplicity of sounds.

His work is highly acclaimed in the press, often described as innovative, visual, energetic, and different from any previously known concepts. His love for ice music was raised in 1999 when the commission of the winterfestival at Lillehammer asked him to compose and play in a frozen waterfall. He has invented the concept of icemusic, and also invented a way to perform icemusic indoor in ordinary concert halls, doing around 50 indoor ice concerts every year. CNN calls Isungset the first and only icemusician in the world.

Isungset has been commissioned to compose music for jazz festivals, dance performances, theatre, and film, with 41 commissioned concerts.

He has released ten solo albums and is now doing most of his work internationally. Solo concerts, with his band or in collaboration with other artists. In 2006 he had the idea of creating an icemusic festival and started the Ice Music Festival at Geilo, Norway organized by Pål Knutsson Medhus. He is also the founding manager of the record label All Ice Records.

His most recent project is the Glassmusic together with Arve Henriksen. They released an album named World of Glass in late 2014. The recordings were largely made in front of a live audience in Tallinn. All the instruments were made from glass by students from the Estonian Academy of Arts.

He is a member of the bandsGroupa (Sweden), Utla and Isglem. He has ongoing duos with Per Jørgensen, Arve Henriksen, Sissel Vera Pettersen, Didier Petit, Therese Skauge, Jorma Tapio and Stian Westerhus.

For the 2017 Vossajazz festival, Isungset was commissioned to compose new music for a new band.

Isungset is also an associate professor at the Grieg Academy, University of Bergen.

== Honors ==
- 1996: Vossajazzprisen
- 2016:Financial Times named Isungset as one of the "First persons".
- 2008: Edvardprisen in the Open class for the album Igloo

== Projects ==
- 2010: Organic expressions, project with three dancers (Rebecca Hytting, Guro Rimeslåtten, Christine Kjellberg) from the Carte Blanche Dance Company
- 2012: Isslottet, at the Oslo Opera and Ballet

== Discography ==
=== Solo albums ===
- 1997: Reise (NorCD)
- 2000: Floating Rhythms (Via Music)
- 2002: Iceman Is (All Ice Records) (Jazzland/Virgin), with Arve Henriksen
- 2003: Middle of Mist (NorCD)
- 2006: Igloo (All Ice Records), nominated for Spellemannprisen in the class Jazz, with Sidsel Endresen
- 2007: Two Moons (All Ice Records), with Per Jørgensen
- 2008: Ice Concerts (All Ice Records)
- 2009: Hibernation (All Ice Records)
- 2010: Winter Songs (All Ice Records)
- 2014: World Of Glass (All Ice Records), with Arve Henriksen
- 2015: Meditations (All Ice Records)
- 2015: Terje Isungset & Stian Westerhus (All Ice Records), with Stian Westerhus
- 2015: Isslottet (All Ice Records)
- 2016: Oase Terje Isungset & Sissel Vera Pettersen (All Ice Records)
- 2019: Sildrande (All Ice Records) Terje Isungset with Arve Henriksen, Mats Eilertsen, Nils Økland, Morten Qvenild, Sissel Vera Pettersen & others

=== Collaborative works ===
With Kenneth Sivertsen

- 1985: Amalgamation (Hot Club Records), including Knut Riisnæs and Bjørn Kjellemyr

Within Karl Seglem's Sogn-A-Song

- 1991: Sogn-A-Song (NorCD)
- 1994: Rit (NorCD)

Within Isglem (duo with Karl Seglem)

- 1991: Rom (NorCD)
- 1992: To Steg (NorCD)
- 1996: Null G (NorCD)
- 2003: Fire (NorCD)
- 2016: "Femte" (NorCD)

Within Orleysa, fest. Tore Brunborg

- 1991: Orleysa (Odin Records)
- 1993: Svanshornet (Odin Records)

Within Utla (including Håkon Høgemo and Karl Seglem)

- 1992: Utla (NorCD)
- 1993: Juv (NorCD)
- 1995: Brodd (NorCD)
- 1999: Dans (NorCD)
- 2003: Song (NorCD), feat. Berit Opheim Versto

Within Groupa (including Jonas Simonson and Mats Edén)

- 1999: Lavalek (Xource)
- 2008: Frost (Footprint)
- 2014: Silent Folk (Footprint)
- 2016: "Kind of folk, vol 1. Sweden. (All Ice Records)

With others

- 1995: Haugtussa (Kirkelig Kulturverksted), with poems by Arne Garborg (including Lynni Treekrem, Annbjørg Lien, Arild Andersen, Børge Petersen-Øverleir, Hans Fredrik Jacobsen, Ketil Bjørnstad, Per Hillestad and Tone Hulbækmo)
- 1995: Det syng (Kirkelig Kulturverksted), with Lynni Treekrem
- 1996: Prosa (NorCD), with poems by Jon Fosse (including Arve Henriksen, Håkon Høgemo, Karl Seglem and Reidar Skår)
- 1996: Tya - frå Bor til Bytes (NorCD), with Elin Rosseland, Karl Seglem and Reidar Skår
- 1998: Spir (NorCD), with Karl Seglem, Berit Opheim Versto, Morten Sæle and Audun Erlien
- 1999: Bergtatt, with Grete Helgerød and Oslo Kammerkor
- 2000: Daa (NorCD), trio with Arve Henriksen and Karl Seglem
- 2001: Shadows And Light (FMR Records), duo with Frode Gjerstad
- 2004: New North (NorCD), with Karl Seglem
- 2005: Didier Petit - Terje Isungset (Vossa Jazz Records), duo with Didier Petit live at Vossajazz 2003
- 2006: Aihki (Ektro Records), duo with Jorma Tapio
- 2006: Sáivu, with Arve Henriksen and Torgeir Vassvik
- 2006: On the Great Alkali Plains (Jester Records), with Espen Jørgensen
- 2008: Agbalagba Daada (Ektro Records), duo with Per Jørgensen
- 2008: Laden With Rain (FMR Records), duo with Stian Westerhus
- 2008: Sådagen (Etnisk musikklubb), with Eilif Gundersen, Gunnlaug Lien Myhr and Tor Egil Kreken
- 2011: City Stories (NorCD), with Daniel Herskedal
- 2011: Beginner's Guide to Scandinavia (Nascente/Virgin), with various artists

Awards
Preceded by Harald Dahlstrøm	Recipient of the Vossajazzprisen; 1996	Succeeded by Frank Jakobsen
Preceded by Gisle Kverndokk	Recipient of the Open class Edvardprisen; 2008	Succeeded by Alfred Janson
