= Tobias Sjögren =

- Born: 23 October 1970 (age 54)
- Origin: Gothenburg, Sweden
- Genres: Jazz
- Occupation(s): Musician, composer
- Instrument: Guitar
- Website: tobiassjogren.com

Tobias Sjögren (born 23 October 1970) is a Swedish jazz guitarist and composer, a graduate Master of Arts (1996). He is known for his solo albums, such as Hymn (1994) and Tobias Sjögren (2002), and for several collaborations. He has composed music to poems by Gunnar Ekelöf released on the album Ord På Golvet (1995) with Joakim Milder (saxophone) and Johannes Lundberg (bass). He collected grønlandsk musikk (1995) together with saxophonist Christian Vuust. This music can be heard on several of his albums, like The Thule Spirit (Virgin Records 1997), where the Norwegian trumpeter Per Jørgensen contributes in the trio. He was born in Gothenburg.

Since 1993, he has contributed on several albums with Lars Danielsson's band European Voices, together with Nils Petter Molvær and Marilyn Mazur, among others. He has led the trio Northern Voices with Vuust and Audun Kleive (1998–) which has resulted in Shaman (Q-rious music, 2003). With Per Jørgensen, which he has worked with since 1990, he released Unspoken songs (Curling Legs, 2006) with his own compositions in a hushed Pat Metheny-style, also performed at the 2006 MaiJazz in Stavanger, Norway.

He composed music to the ballet Meget Krafigt Glemt (København, 1996) by Thomas Eisenhardt, as well as the installation performance Mörker (Gothenburg 2000).
