= Albert Gjerdrum =

Norwegian jurist

Albert Ehrensvärd Gjerdrum (22 June 1869 – 24 February 1954) was a Norwegian jurist.

He was born in Kristiania as a son of Carl Ferdinand Gjerdrum, nephew of Jørgen and Otto Gjerdrum and grandson of Ole Gjerdrum. Together with Ovidia Kloumann he had the son Carl Ferdinand Gjerdrum, who was killed during the Second World War.

He finished his secondary education in 1888 and took the cand.jur. degree in 1893. He was a deputy judge in Farsund from 1894 to 1895, junior solicitor and attorney from 1895 and lawyer from 1901. He was an attorney for Bøndernes Bank, Arbeidernes Landsbank and Spareskillingsbanken. His law firm was called A. Gjerdrum og C. F. Gjerdrum, and had its offices in the Oslo's main street Karl Johans gate.

He was also an acting judge in Oslo City Court from 1898 to 1909, and was also a defender in Oslo Court of Appeal. He handled several profiled criminal cases in his time, such as the Mossin case and the Aasheim case. In the 1920s he also lectured in civil law at the Royal Frederick University, and issued the book Utsigt over den nye Civilprosess. He was a board member of the Norwegian Bar Association from 1930, and also a member of public boards and commissions.

He received the King's Medal of Merit in gold in 1947. He died in February 1954.
