= Joar Olsen =

Norwegian resistance member (1924–1945)

Joar Ervin Olsen (1 February 1924 – 14 February 1945) was a Norwegian resistance member who was killed during the occupation of Norway by Nazi Germany.

He was born in Bærum as the son of parents from Oslo and Hammerfest. He worked in Bærum as a car mechanic. During the occupation of Norway by Nazi Germany he joined Milorg in 1943. He was a part of a group called Barlindgjengen (the "Yew Gang"), originally consisting of men from Jar in Bærum. In May 1944 the gang was summoned for sabotage training under the leadership of Per Røed; the camp was in Bærumsmarka. The gang became incorporated into District 13's sabotage squad Aks 13000, created in 1944. Olsen became an important aide-de-camp for the Aks 13000 Staff.

Olsen was active in late 1944. Together with Per Røed he blew up six railroad tank cars with gasoline at Lysaker Station. Lysaker Station was hit by five such sabotage missions between 16 December 1944 and 13 January 1945. On 10 December 1944, Olsen, Røed and Odd Isøy was to blow up fifteen railroad tank cars at Filipstad near Oslo Vestbanestasjon; two other persons were to be used as guards. However, the two guards became busy when a handful of railway workers were discovered on the location. After placing the explosives, Røed was intercepted as he almost stumbled upon a German guard. Because of this, the sabotage team retreated in silence, and not long after German specialists arrived and removed the explosives. Intelligence later showed that next to the fifteen tanks was a train filled with ammunition, possibly even V-2 parts. Had all of this exploded, it would be disastrous. On 23 December 1944 Olsen participated in an attack at the naval section of the Nazi Hird. When attacking the office, Per Røed was surprised by a Hird gunman, who had probably laid a trap. Olsen stormed in from adjacent room, killed the gunman, and narrowly escaped together with Røed. On another occasion, Olsen and Røed drove a car with illegal weapons, when they were stopped by a German road control. They escaped when Olsen showed a faux document which claimed that the car belonged to the Red Cross.

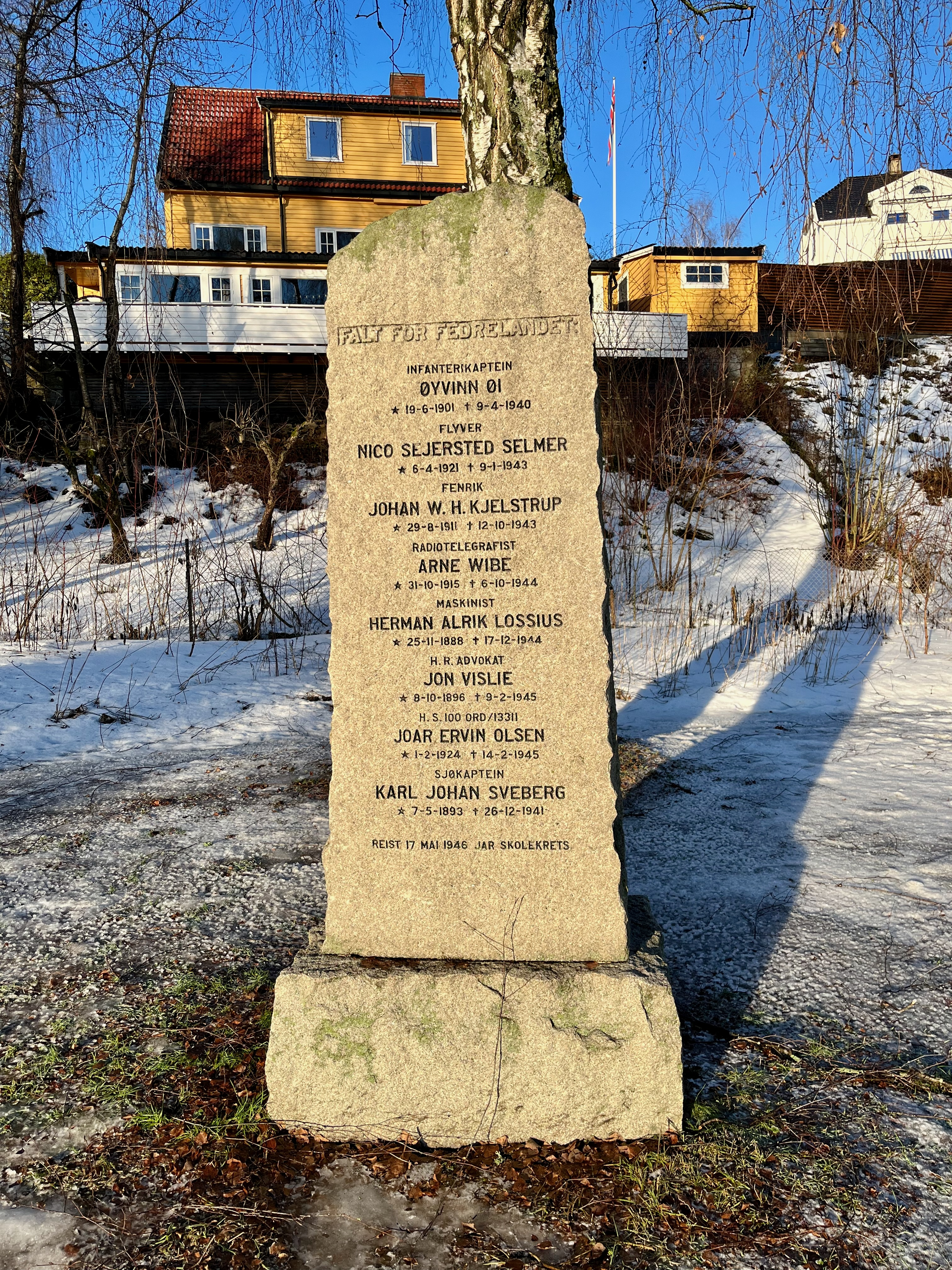
A memorial at Jar commemorates Joar Olsen, Øyvinn Øi, Jon Vislie and others.

Olsen's last mission was Aksjon smør on 12 February 1945, in which Milorg men stole foodstuffs from two warehouses, one in the street Tollbugata belonging to German forces, and one in the street Skippergata belonging to Arbeidstjenesten. The foodstuffs were distributed to Milorg men who hid in the forests surrounding Oslo. On 13 February 1945 the Aks 13000 members, and Aksjon smør participants, Arvid Hansen and Adolf Bogstad were killed, and six more were arrested. On the next day, Joar Olsen went to pick up weapons from a secret storage garage at Stabekk. Weapons stock had to be replenished after the attack on the car workshop Brødrene Christensen in Sandvika on 12 February. The first pickup went well, but Statspolitiet officers waited at the second pickup-spot. Olsen drew his Colt revolver, but was shot three times. He died not long after.
