= Sissel Vera Pettersen =

Norwegian vocalist and musician (born 1977)

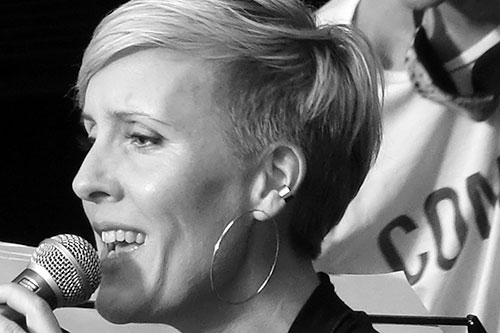
Sissel Vera Pettersen at Aarhus Jazz Festival 2015

Sissel Vera Pettersen (born January 28, 1977, in Oslo, Norway is a Norwegian jazz vocalist, saxophonist and composer, based in Copenhagen, Denmark. She is known for her extended and experimental vocal techniques, often mixed with the use of live electronic processing, and for her collaborations with artists such as Jon Balke, Theo Bleckmann, John Hollenbeck, Lionel Loueke, Chick Corea, Trondheim Jazz Orchestra, Trondheim Voices, Christian Wallumrød, Marc Ducret, Mats Gustafsson, Bo Stief, Marilyn Mazur, Terje Isungset, Nikolaj Hess, Mikkel Ploug and John Tchicai.

Pettersen's work also incorporates performance, theatre and visual art. She has collaborated with choreographers such as Kjersti Alveberg and Stuart Lynch and in a series of projects with Cirka Teater. She has exhibited paintings and graphic prints in Norway (Rana Kunstmuseum, Galleri Fenka) and Denmark (Galleri Arleth), and has made cover art for the German record label Winter & Winter.

== Discography ==
=== As leader/co-leader ===
- 2014: Equilibrium, Liquid Light, Songlines
- 2011: Equilibrium, Walking Voices, Songlines
- 2011: Lift & Thomas Agergaard, Convocation, Gateway
- 2009: Equilibrium, Songlines
- 2009: A Word, duo with Nikolaj Hess, Calibrated
- 2007: Lift vs Sydow, Gateway
- 2006: By This River, duo with Nikolaj Hess Music For Dreams
- 2004: Disappearhear, duo with David Thor Johnsson, Park Grammofon
- 2002: Mandala, Acoustic Records

=== Other projects ===
- Somehow I Lost My Way, Tuva Halse's Bento Box Trio, 2024
- Marilyn Mazur & TRITONUS, Eksistens, 2014
- Tree House, Trondheim Jazzorkester+Albatrosh, 2014
- Blood Sings, The Music Of Suzanne Vega, Animal Music, 2012
- Kinetic Music, Trondheim Jazzorkester/Magic Pocket, 2011
- Dolls & Guns, Kevin Brow, 2011
- The Open Road, John Sund, 2011
- Improvoicing, Trondheim Voices, 2010
- City Stories, Daniel Herskedal, 2010
- What If? Trondheim Jazzorkester/Erlend Skomsvoll, 2009
- Kobert Trondheim Jazzorkester, 2009
- Lyckokatt, Anna Kruse, 2009
- Dancing Trees, Joakim Milder/ Olav Kallhovd, 2007
- Themes Of Hope, Ayi Solomon, 2008
- Hymns In Time, Mads Granum Kvartet, 2006
