= Øyvinn Øi =

Norwegian military officer (1901–1940)

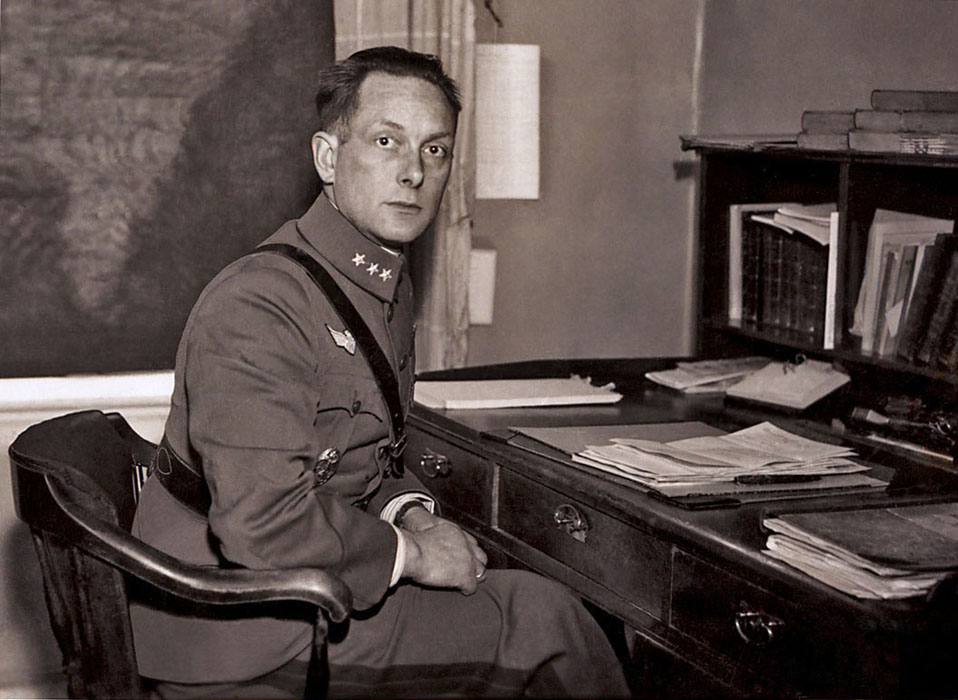
- Captain Øyvinn Øi some time between 1935 and 1940.
- Born: 19 June 1901
- Died: 9 April 1940 (aged 38)
- Allegiance: Norway
- Branch: Norwegian Army
- Service years: –1940
- Rank: Captain
- Conflicts: Second World War: Norwegian Campaign †

Øyvinn Øi (19 June 1901 in Hadsel Municipality in Vesterålen – 9 April 1940) was a Norwegian military officer during the outbreak of the Second World War.

== Personal life ==
Øyvinn Øi was born in Hadsel Municipality, the son of lector Gunnar Øi and Thora, née Lind. In 1926 he married Aagot Hesselborg, with whom he had four children.

== Career ==
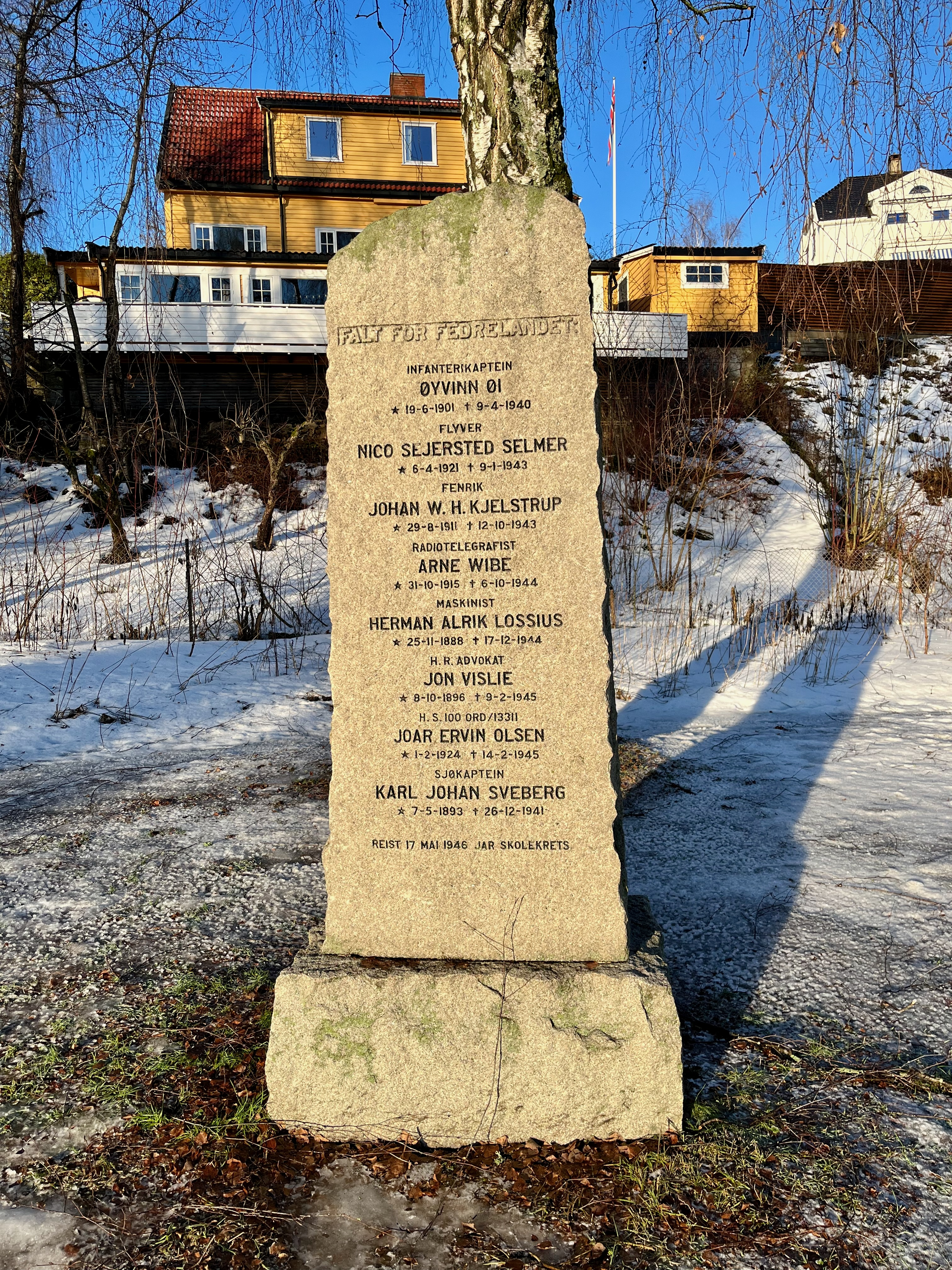
A memorial at Jar commemorates Øyvinn Øi, Joar Olsen, Jon Vislie and others.

After his examen artium Øi took an officer exam attending the Norwegian Military Academy. He also did military studies in France. Øi, a captain in the general staff, became known to the general public for his lecture entitled "Det strategiske overfall" ('The Strategic Attack') to the officers' society, Oslo Militære Samfund, on 6 March 1939. In this lecture, Øi stated that Norway had inadequate defences and was vulnerable to a foreign attack. This caused a stir in some groups, especially the social democrat newspaper Arbeiderbladet, which came close to accusing him of treason.

Norway was indeed invaded when Operation Weserübung reached the country on 9 April 1940. Øi was killed on the same day at a road block set up by German forces at Grorud. He had volunteered to go on a mission to Oslo on behalf of the Norwegian general staff after the staff had evacuated from the Norwegian capital.
