= Kaare Sundby =

Norwegian engineer (1905–1945)

Kaare Sundby (1 January 1905 – 9 February 1945) was a Norwegian engineer who was executed during the occupation of Norway by Nazi Germany.

He was born in Modum as the son of veterinarian Theodor Sundby and his wife Gullaug, née Bjertnes. Sundby married and had one child, and the family had settled in Vestre Aker.

Sundby had taken an education in engineering. When Norway was invaded by Germany in 1940, he became involved in the subsequent fighting. He later involved himself in the Norwegian resistance movement, both in Milorg, as a courier and intelligence gatherer. When the Nazi police leader Karl Marthinsen was assassinated by the Norwegian resistance on 8 February 1945, Sundby was arrested together with thirty-three others, including Carl Ferdinand Gjerdrum, Haakon Sæthre and Jon Vislie, as a reprisal. Sundby was executed on Akershus Fortress on 9 February, his body lowered in the Oslofjord.
