= Arne Bonde (editor) =

Norwegian newspaper editor and radio executive

Arne Andreas Bonde (8 October 1924 – 7 June 2003) was a Norwegian newspaper editor and radio executive.

He was born in Ålesund as a son of engineer Jens Gustav Bonde (1894–1956) and Ester Sandborg Røe (1889–1980). He started his journalistic career in the Norwegian News Agency at the age of eighteen, without much education. He stayed there for ten years. In 1952 he was hired in Verdens Gang. The newspaper had been started in 1945, and was popularized during the post-war period. From early on, Bonde was an internal proponent of more person-oriented journalism. He was also responsible for the motor section since 1953. In 1962 he was promoted to news editor.

Verdens Gang, or the shortened form VG, adopted the tabloid format in 1963, and has been the largest in Norway since 1981. In 1969 he was promoted to co-editor alongside Vegard Sletten and Oskar Hasselknippe. Bonde stepped down already in 1974, out of his own concerns that he was not young enough for VG.

Bonde was the director and co-owner of the advertising agency Thau Reklamebyrå from 1975 to 1977 and director in the publishing house Ernst G. Mortensens Forlag from 1977 to 1982. From 1982 to 1983 he edited the Riksmål publication Frisprog. He also worked for Time–Life as a stringer correspondent from 1947 to 1973. He was a board member of Associated Press and Norges Handels og Sjøfartstidende, and chaired humanitarian organizations Save the Children (Norwegian branch) and the Norwegian Refugee Council. In the 1975 book Stat og presse. Med pennen i jernlunge he sharply attacked the Norwegian press support (a state subsidy to newspapers).

In 1983 he was appointed director of the new radio channel NRK P2. The channel was opened on 1 September 1984. He retired in 1991, but continued some years as a consultant. He also edited the monthly Kulturelt Perspektiv, and continued publishing books.

He was married to Liss Pande since 1951, and died in June 2003 in Oslo.
