= Outland (JøKleBa album) =

Studio album by JøKleBa
- Released: October 24, 2014
- Recorded: May 2014
- Studio: Rainbow Studio; Oslo, Norway
- Genre: Jazz
- Length: 46:55
- Label: ECM; ECM 2413
- Producer: Manfred Eicher

JøKleBa chronology
Nu Jøk? (2011)	Outland (2014)

Professional ratings
Review scores
Source	Rating
The Guardian	3/5 stars

Outland is a jazz studio album by Norwegian trio JøKleBa—consisting Per Jørgensen, Audun Kleive and Jon Balke—recorded in May 2014 and released on ECM October that same year. Among the compositions are references to Sylvia Plath, Laura Restrepo, Sadegh Hedayat, Guy de Maupassant and Ken Kesey.

== Reception ==
In his review for The Guardian, John Fordham commented "Jokleba’s music is probably best suited to free-improv listeners, but its meticulous detailing and musicality do have an eerie seductiveness that reaches way outside that loop."

== Track listing ==
All music is composed by Per Jørgensen, Audun Kleive and Jon Balke

No.	Title	Length
1.	"Vridd 1"	1:50
2.	"Bell Jar"	5:33
3.	"Blind Owl"	2:35
4.	"Beyond the Glass"	3:13
5.	"The Nightwood"	4:02
6.	"Rodion"	3:36
7.	"Horla"	3:59
8.	"Vridd 2"	2:00
9.	"Tremens"	5:00
10.	"Brighton"	5:39
11.	"One Flew Over"	4:51
12.	"Curious Incident"	1:49
13.	"Below the Vulcano"	1:40
14.	"Vridd 3"	1:08
Total length:		46:55

== Personnel ==
- Per Jørgensen – trumpet, vocals, kalimba, flute
- Audun Kleive – electronics, drums, percussion
- Jon Balke – electronics, piano
