= Fjordgata Records =

Norwegian music label

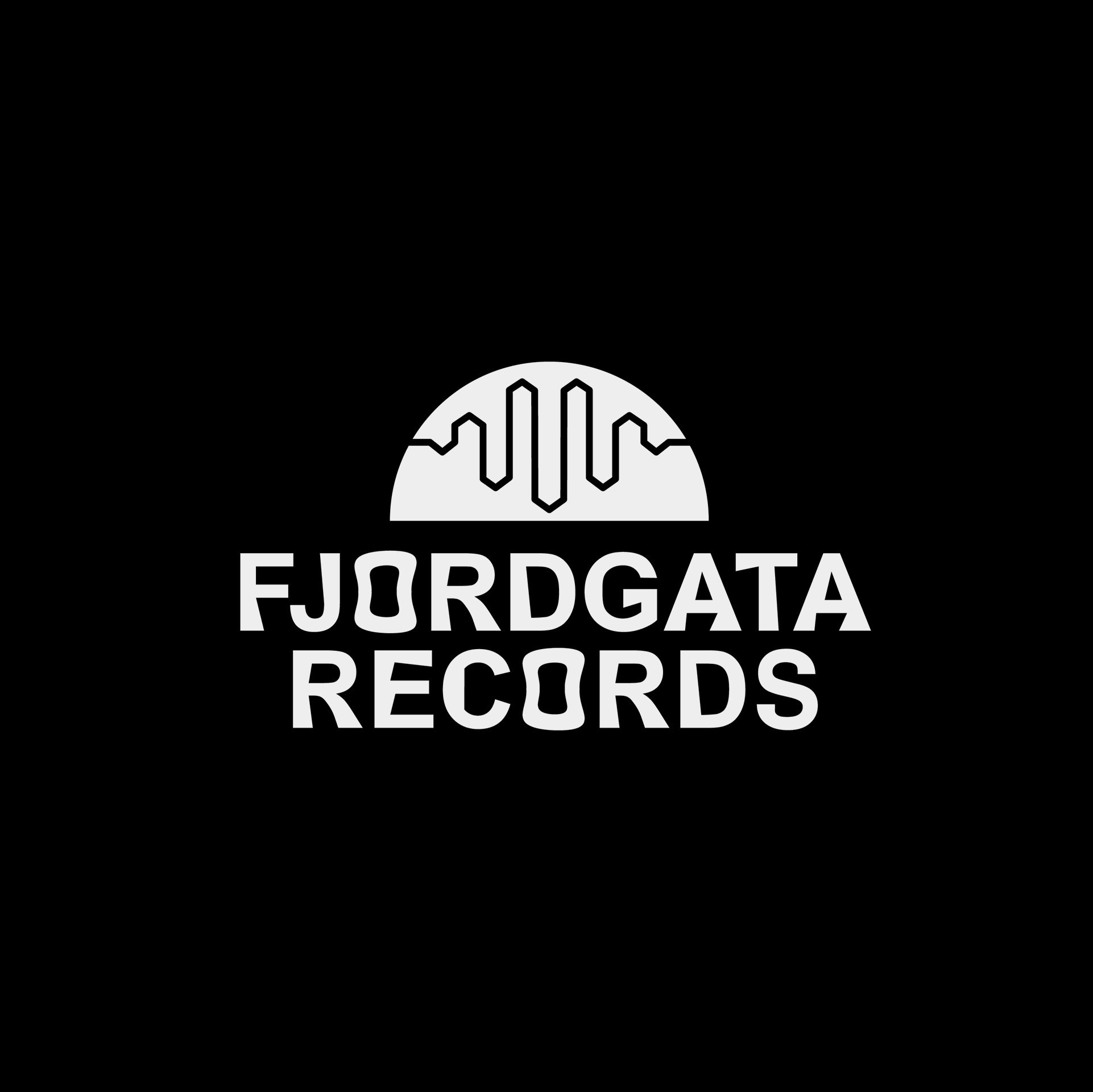
- The official logo for Fjordgata Records.
- Founded: 2021
- Founder: Benjamín Gislí Einarsson, Sara Fjeldvær, Tuva Halse, Audun Rørmark
- Distributor: Bandcamp
- Genre: Jazz, pop
- Country of origin: Norway
- Location: Trondheim, Norway
- Official website: www.fjordgatarecords.com

Fjordgata Records is an independent music label founded in 2021 by Sara Fjeldvær, Benjamín Gislí Einarsson, Tuva Halse and Audun Rørmark.

Fjordgata Records was founded by four Norwegian musicians while they were students of the Jazzlinja at Norwegian University of Science and Technology. The label name comes from the name of a street in Trondheim where the idea of this new label was born. Fjordgata works as a cooperative of artists aiming at maintaining control on their production. The Gaffa music magazine asks: "One often hears about up-and-coming bands and artists. But who are the young promising enthusiasts who want to facilitate and fight for these musicians when no one else does? Who dares to compete in a monopolized music landscape where unpredictability and nepotism reign?" According to Gaffa, "the goal [of Fjordgata Records] was to create a platform to release their own and others' music, ensuring that the musicians themselves do not lose significant royalties or ownership shares of their music." According to Fjeldvær, we "see many who are ridiculously talented, hardworking, and completely absorbed in their music. But they can't crack the code with the industry stuff and end up getting lost". Halse explains that "now we have a platform where we not only record and distribute music but also organize release concerts, work on video production for songs, and so on". Einarsson claims that the long-term objective of the Fjordgata Records label is to establish it as one of the most exciting record labels in Nordic jazz and alternative music.

As part of its support for young musicians, Fjordgata releases debut albums, but also follow-ups. Fjordgata Records has released albums from the Norwegian and Dutch scenes so far.

According to Audun Vinger in 2024, after just a few years, the quality of the music released by Fjordgata Records holded up well in comparison to the big players.

Boxed, by the Bento Box Trio, was praised by the Norwegian jazz magazine Jazznytt, featuring an unconventional trio leaving huge space for "free roles and open landscapes". The follow-up album, Somehow I Lost My Way, was selected by the Europe Jazz Network as an album of the month (November 2024) in the Europe Jazz Media Chart.

The debut album of the Hogne Kleiberg Trio was hailed by critics for its originality and melodic character, inviting to a soundscape reminiscent of the lyricism of Bill Evans, strength and expressiveness of McCoy Tyner.

Stars, by Sara Fjeldvær, was found to showcase musical elements making it "something unique" through her compelling artistry, a "counterweight to the retouched and commercial pop vocal." Fjeldvær's works for Fjordgata Records led to her being named one of the Artists to Watch 2025 selected by the Independent Music Companies Association.

The album nemesis/cruel, by the tuvahalseband, was nominated for the EDVARD Award of the Norwegian performing rights corporation in the Challenger (Utfordrer) category.

Fjordgata Records was a finalist label for the 2025 music industry award (bransjestipendet) at the Vill Vill Vest festival in Bergen.

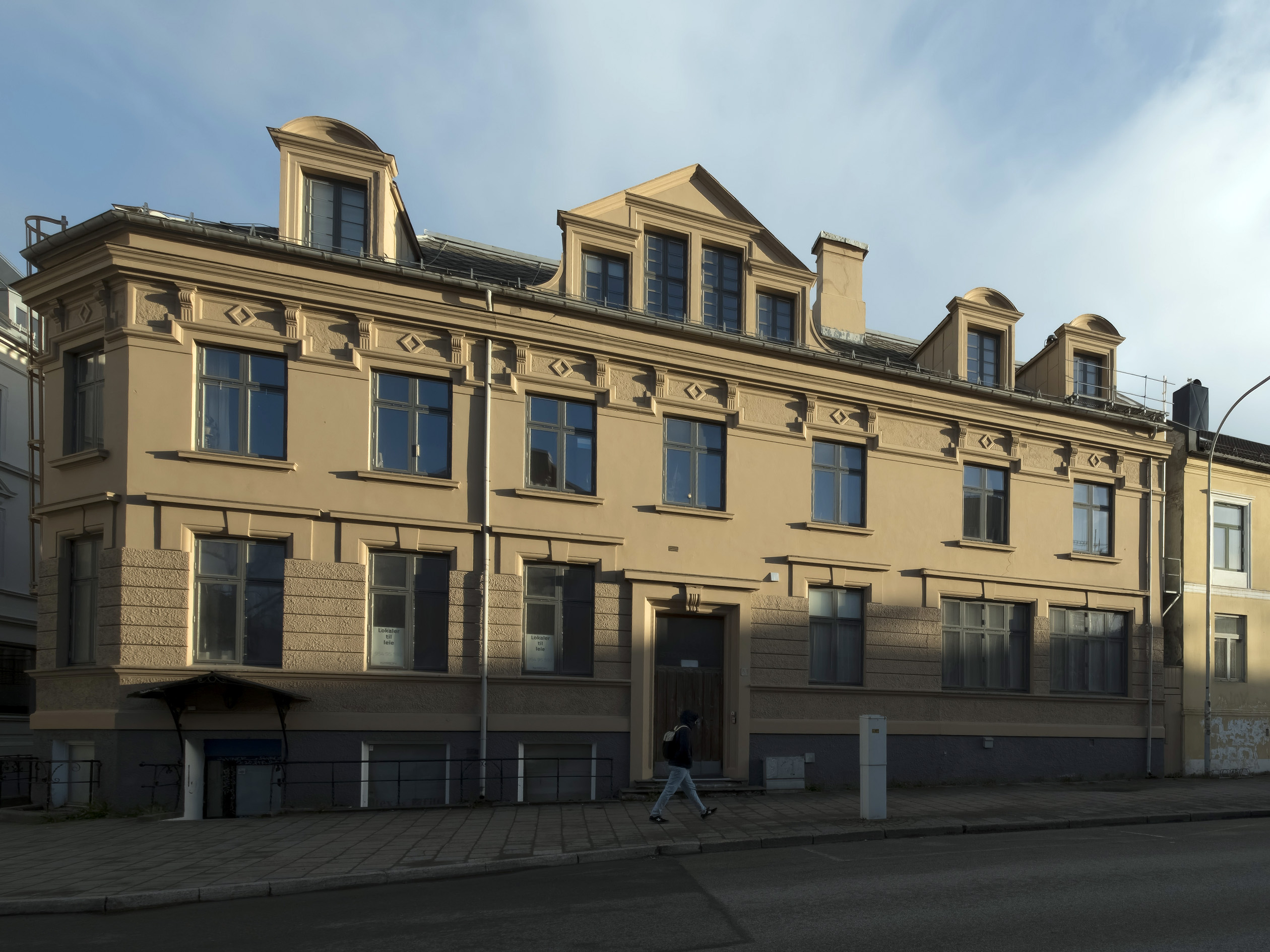
Fjordgata 3 in Trondheim, where the Fjordgata Records label was founded

== Artists ==
- audun
- Benjamín Gísli
- Benjamín Gísli Trio
- Bento Box Trio
- Björg Blöndal's C4THERINE
- Cosmic Swing Orchestra
- Hogne Kleiberg Trio
- Ingeborg Sollid
- Isak & Ingeborg
- Johanna Reine-Nilsen
- Mathias Angelhus
- MONSTERA
- Oscar Andreas Haug
- Petter Dalane Quintet
- Ragnarök Trio
- Rat Talk
- Sara Fjeldvær
- Skage Larsen
- tuvahalseband
