= JøKleBa =

Norwegian jazz band

- Origin: Oslo, Norway
- Genres: Jazz
- Years active: 1990–2003, 2011-
- Labels: Odin Records; Curling Legs; EmArcy Records; Universal Music Norway
- Members: Per Jørgensen; Audun Kleive; Jon Balke
- Website: www.jokleba.no

JøKleBa (establishesd 1990 in Oslo, Norway) is a Norwegian jazz band with a free improvising expression.

All the band members are still very active in different projects, but in recent years has played very few concerts as JøKleBa, but on the tenth anniversary of Finsejazz they excited the Winter Jazz Audience. In 2011 they got into a new active period with festival appearances and a new album, Nu Jøk?.

== Band members ==
- Per Jørgensen – trumpet, guitar, percussion, vocals
- Audun Kleive – drums, keyboards, percussion, vocals
- Jon Balke – keyboards, percussion, vocals

== Discography ==
- 1991: On and On (Odin)
- 1992: JøKleBa! (Odin)
- 1996: JøKleBa Live! (Curling Legs)
- 2011: Nu Jøk? (EmArcy, Universal Norway)
- 2014: Outland (ECM)
