= Peter Knudsen (musician) =

- Born: 22 March 1980 (age 45); Östersund, Sweden
- Genres: jazz and classical music
- Occupations: Pianist, composer, artist-researcher
- Instrument: piano
- Years active: 1996 –

Peter Knudsen (Östersund, March 22, 1980) is a Swedish pianist, composer and artist-researcher.

== Biography ==
Peter Knudsen began playing the piano and composing his own music at the age of 10. As a teenager, he discovered jazz and 20th-century classical music, which greatly influenced his artistic development. At the age of 20, he was awarded the prestigious Ingvar Johansson Scholarship for young jazz musicians.

From 2001 to 2006, Knudsen studied music at the University of Gothenburg, a formative period during which he established his own trio and the quintet Blåeld. In 2006, Blåeld released their debut album, Aurora, showcasing original compositions that seamlessly blend jazz, pop, and 20th-century classical influences.

Knudsen spent several years adapting the music of Debussy and Ravel for jazz trio, culminating in the recording of Impressions – a Tribute to Debussy and Ravel in 2008, released on Found You Recordings. The trio later performed this program at music festivals in France and Sweden during 2009 and 2010, receiving acclaim for their innovative approach.

In 2010, Peter Knudsen initiated the Peterson-Berger Revisited project, collaborating with a quartet that included saxophonist Joakim Milder. The project featured fresh arrangements of national romantic music by the composer Wilhelm Peterson-Berger. In 2011, the group toured with this material and recorded an album in the composer's historic home, Sommarhagen. Simultaneously, Knudsen was working on original compositions for a new eight-piece ensemble, the Peter Knudsen Eight. This work culminated in the release of Sagas of the Present in 2012 on the Italian label CAM Jazz.

In 2016, Peter Knudsen was commissioned to compose new big band music for the Stockholm Jazz Orchestra, which led to the creation of the folklore-inspired suite Nature Spirits. This suite was later released as an album under the same title by Do Music Records in 2019.

During 2015 and 2016, Knudsen also participated in a teacher exchange program in Brazil, where he performed with a Brazilian-Swedish trio that included drummer Kiko Freitas and bassist Zeca Assumpção. Around the same period, he began collaborating with the group Derupeto, an international quartet featuring Tobias Grim on guitar, Rubem Farias on bass, and Deodato Siquir on drums and vocals, representing Sweden, Brazil and Mozambique. The quartet released their debut album, Derupeto, in 2020.

In 2018, Knudsen started a duo together with classical guitarist David Härenstam, a collaboration that led to the critically acclaimed album All in Twilight in 2023, a meeting between classical guitar and jazz piano with a repertoire that ranges from Japanese art music to Swedish folk music. Knudsen and Härenstam's duo work was also integrated into Knudsen's artistic research project based on improvising over 20th-century classical music something that resulted in the album Reimaginations in 2024. On this album, Knudsen is joined by improvising musicians from Sweden and Norway in constellations from duo to sextet.

Peter Knudsen serves as a senior lecturer at the School of Music, Theatre, and Art at Örebro University, where he teaches piano, improvisation, and ensemble performance. In this capacity, he has been involved in research projects exploring the intersection of music and artificial intelligence, in addition to conducting his own studies on 20th-century classical music and improvisation. He is currently completing a PhD in Artistic Research at the Norwegian University of Science and Technology.

== Discography ==
Albums:

- 2006 – Aurora with Blåeld
- 2008 – Impressions- a tribute to Debussy and Ravel with Peter Knudsen Trio
- 2012 – Sagas of the Present with Peter Knudsen Eight
- 2013 – Peterson-Berger Revisited with Peter Knudsen Kvartett
- 2021 – Plays the music of Peter Knudsen: Nature Spirits with Stockholm Jazz Orchestra
- 2021 – Derupeto
- 2023 – All in Twilight with David Härenstam
- 2024 – Reimaginations
