= Per Jørgensen =

Norwegian jazz musician (born 1952)

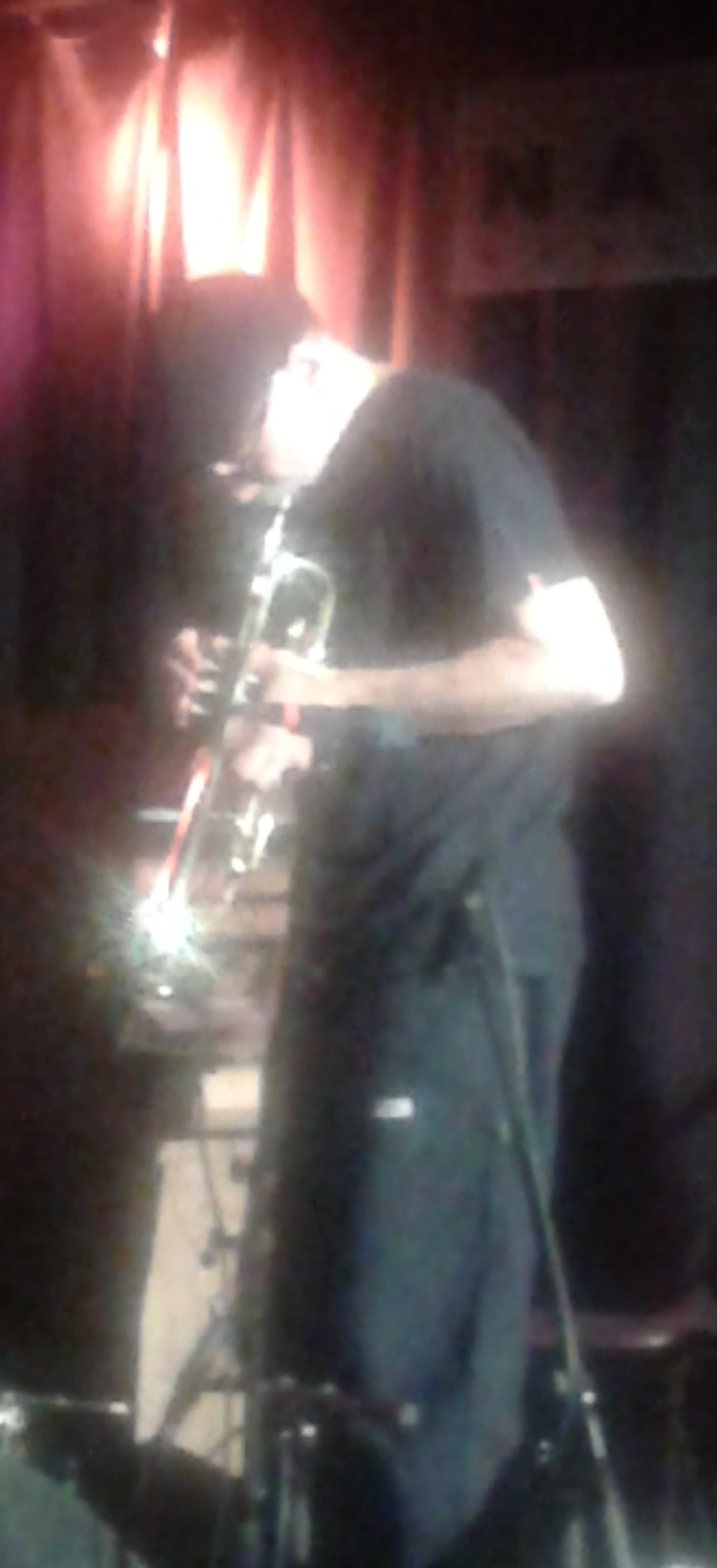
- Jørgensen with Agbaland at Nattjazz 2015

Background information
- Born: 9 September 1952 (age 73); Bergen, Norway
- Genres: Jazz
- Occupation: Musician
- Instrument: Trumpet
- Labels: ECM, NorCD, Odin

Per Jørgensen (born 9 September 1952) is a Norwegian multi-instrumentalist with trumpet as his main instrument, also known for his vocal contributions, in collaboration with Dag Arnesen, Knut Kristiansen, Alex Riel, Jon Christensen, Jon Balke, Audun Kleive, Jan Gunnar Hoff, Marilyn Mazur, Nils Petter Molvær, Bugge Wesseltoft, and Terje Isungset.

== Career ==
Jørgensen was a major voice in Bergen Jazz Community in the 1970s, with marked musical performances with bands such as Danmarksplass Rock og Jazz (trumpet and voice) with the young saxophoneplayer Olav Dale from Voss Municipality and the profound Bergen guitarist Ole Thomsen, now central member of the Bergen Big Band. He was also a central member of the Bergen Blues Band (guitar and voice) and Knut Kristiansen Kvintett, and later on 'Tamma', JøKleBa, Magnetic North Orchestra and in various duo projects with Jon Balke, Terje Isungset and others.

In 1991, Jørgensen was awarded "Vossajazzprisen" for his contribution to jazz in Hordaland, and was the same year he was elected "FNJ" (The Norwegian Jazz Musicians Federation) "Jazz Musician of the Year". From 1992, he held a Trio ("J.I.G.") in Bergen together with Terje Isungset and Ole Amund Gjersvik, in 1993 he also had a trio collaboration with Eldbjørg Raknes and Christian Wallumrød, and toured with Jon Balke & Magnetic North Orchestra (recording in 1993 released 1995, another release 2002 and one in 2004). In 1995, he was a soloist with the "Veslefrekk" at Vossajazz.

Jørgensen has extensive collaboration with many international performers including guitarist Tobias Sjögren with Unspoken Songs and The Thule Spirit (2006), and percursjonist Marilyn Mazur with firstly Circular Chant (1995) with among others Nils Petter Molvær and Bugge Wesseltoft.

== Honors ==
- 1991: Vossajazzprisen, awarded for his contribution to jazz in Hordaland
- 1991: "Jazz Musician of the Year", awarded by "FNJ" (The Norwegian Jazz Musicians Federation)
- 1995: Buddyprisen
- 2001: Radka Toneff Memorial Award

== Discography ==
Album participations:

With JøKleBa

- 1991: On And On – (Odin Records) – trumpet, flute, vocal
- 1993: Jøkleba! – (Norsk Plateproduksjon AS) – trumpet, vocal
- 1996: Live! – (Curling Legs) – trumpet, vocal
- 2011: Nu Jøk? – (EmArcy, Universal Music Norway) – trumpet, vocal
- 2014: Outland (ECM Records)

With Jon Balke and Magnetic North Orchestra

- 1992: Further – (ECM) – trumpet, vocals
- 1995: Solarized – (Emarcy) – trumpet, vocals
- 2002: Kyanos – (ECM) – trumpet, vocals
- 2004: Diverted travels – (ECM) – trumpet, vocals
- 2012: Magnetic Works 1993–2001 (ECM), compilation

Duo with Tobias Sjøgren

- 1996: Unspoken Words – trumpet, vocals
- 2006: The Thule Spirit – (ToBeJazz Music) – trumpet, vocals

With other projects

- 1991: Secret Mission – Strange Afternoon – trumpet, citar
- 1992: Jon Balke and Oslo 13 – Nonsentration – trumpet
- 1994: Kari Bremnes – Gåte Ved Gåte – trumpet
- 1995: Marilyn Mazur and Pulse Unit – Circular Chant (Storyville) – trumpet, vocals
- 1995: Knut Kristiansen Monk Moods (Odin Records)
- 1995: Jan Gunnar Hoff – Moving
- 1996: Hans Børlie lytrics – Prøv å sette vinger på en stein
- 1997: Terje Isungset – Reise
- 1997: Michael Mantler - The School of Understanding (ECM Records) - vocals
- 1998: Berit Opheim, Bjørn Kjellemyr, Einar Mjølsnes, Per Jørgensen and Sigbjørn Apeland – Fryd (Vossajazz Records) – trumpet
- 1998: Unge Frustrerte Menn – Øl og Peanøtter – trumpet
- 1998: Chocolate Overdose – Whatever – trumpet
- 2002: "Headwaiter" – Not Goin' Anywhere – vocals
- 2002: Cæcilie Norby – First Conversation – trumpet, vocals
- 2004: Svein Folkvord's commissioned work for Vossajazz 2004 – Across (Vossa Jazz Records) – vocals, trumpet
- 2005: Hildegunn Riise and Edvard Askeland (Lyrics by Olav H. Hauge) Under stjernone – vocals, trumpet
- 2006: Miki N'Doye – Tuku – vocals, trumpet
- 2007: Terje Isungset – Two Moons – vocals, ice-trumpet
- 2008: Per Jørgensen and Terje Isungset – Agbalagba Daada (NorCD) – trumpet, heriba-ton, tabla, flute, coupon, vocals, kalimba, percussion, piano
- 2009: Lena Skjerdal – Home
- 2010: Per Jørgensen and Espen Berg's trio "Green Serene" Living live
- 2010: Daniel Herskedal "City Stories»
- 2010: gruppa BMX med "Bergen open»
- 2010: Markku Ounaskari, Samuli Mikkonen and Per Jørgensen – Kuára: Psalms And Folk Songs (ECM) – trumpet
- 2011: Gabriel Fliflet – Åresong

As producer

- 2008: Per Jørgensen and Terje Isungset – Agbalagba Daada (NorCD)

As composer/songwriter

- 2007: Terje Isungset – Two Moons
- 2008: Per Jørgensen and Terje Isungset – Agbalagba Daada (NorCD)

Awards
Preceded by Knut Kristiansen	Recipient of the Vossajazzprisen; 1991	Succeeded by Dag Arnesen
Preceded by Bjørn Kjellemyr	Recipient of the Buddyprisen; 1995	Succeeded by Ole Jacob Hansen
Preceded by Karin Krog	Recipient of the Radka Toneff Memorial Award; 2001	Succeeded by Live Maria Roggen
