= Trio Mediæval =

Vocal group

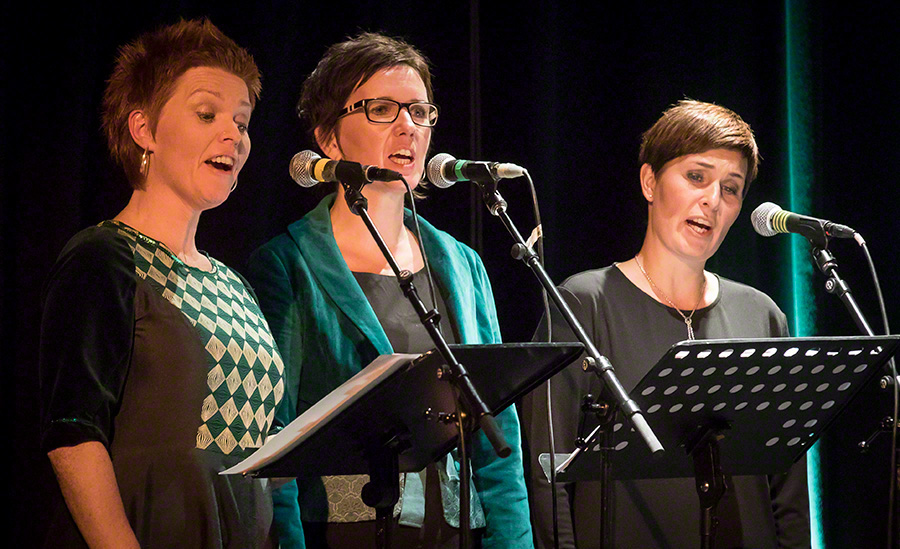
- The trio at stage at a concert in 2016

Background information
- Origin: Norway
- Genres: Vocal; Contemporary; Early music
- Years active: 1997 - present
- Label: ECM
- Members: Anna Maria Friman; Linn Andrea Fuglseth; Jorunn Lovise Husan
- Website: www.triomediaeval.no

Trio Mediæval is a vocal trio established in 1997 in Oslo, mainly to sing medieval polyphonic works. Its members are Anna Maria Friman (from Sweden) and Linn Andrea Fuglseth and Torunn Østrem Ossum (from Norway).

The trio's debut album, Words of the Angel, charted in the Top Ten of the Billboard Classical list. In 2009 the group received a nomination for Best Chamber Music Performance Grammy Award for the album Folk Songs.

== Collaborations ==
Since its early career, the trio has expanded its repertoire to contemporary compositions such as those of Gavin Bryars and Ivan Moody. The title track on the group's album, Words of the Angel (2001), was a Moody work.

The three singers have worked closely with English tenor and vocal ensemble specialist John Potter. On the 2014 album Aquilonis, Torunn Østrem Ossum was unable to participate, so Friman and Fuglseth recruited Berit Opheim as her substitute.

ECM label recording artists, the trio often tours Europe and the United States.

== Discography ==
- 2001: Words of the Angel (ECM)
- 2004: Soir, dit-elle (ECM)
- 2005: Stella Maris (ECM)
- 2007: Folk Songs (ECM)
- 2011: A Worcester Ladymass (ECM)
- 2014: Aquilonis (ECM)
- 2017: Rímur (ECM)
- 2021: Solacium (2L)
- 2023: An Old Hall Ladymass (2L)
- 2024: Yule (2L)

Awards
Preceded by Hilde Louise Asbjørnsen	Recipient of the Open class Gammleng-prisen; 2015	Succeeded by Frode Fjellheim
