= Vetle Vislie =

Norwegian educator and writer (1858–1933)

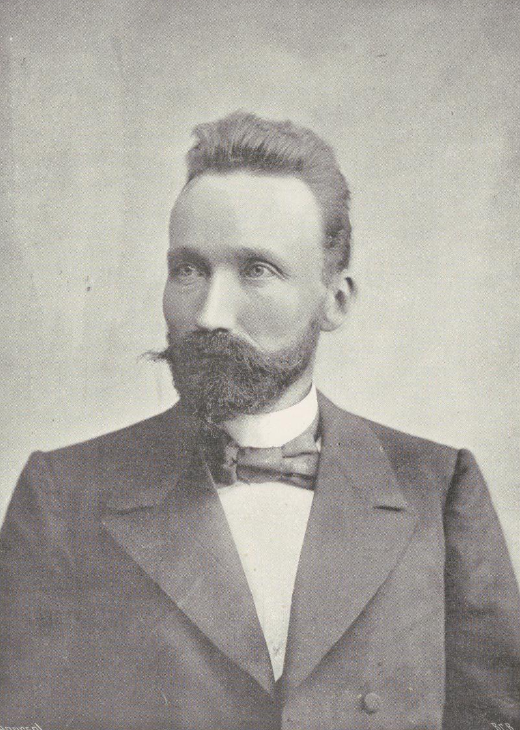
Vetle Vislie in the 1890s.

Vetle Vislie (21 September 1858 – 7 February 1933) was a Norwegian educationalist and writer.

He was born in Skafså as a son of farmer Gjermund Vetleson Vislie (1825–1903) and Anne Larsdotter Mandt (1818–1904). He made his debut as a playwright in 1899, with Utan hovding, and wrote Fru Gerda in 1890. His novels include Heldøla (1895), Solvending (1897), Trollringar (1903), Malm (1906), Lukkespel (1911) and Det nye riket (1913). He was also the rector of the Teachers' Colleges in Kristiansand, from 1908, and Hamar, from 1914. He was a member of Hamar city council for the Temperance Party.

He was the father of lawyer Jon Vislie.

Academic offices
Preceded by Fredrik Marstrander	Rector of Kristiansand Teacher's College; 1908–1914	Succeeded by Baste Midtgaard
