= Jon Vislie =

Norwegian lawyer

Jon Asbjørn Vislie (8 October 1896 – 9 February 1945) was a Norwegian lawyer who was executed during the occupation of Norway by Nazi Germany.

He was born in Kristiania as the son of educationalist and writer Vetle Vislie and his Scanian wife Gerda, née Annerlöv. Jon Vislie married and had two children, and the family had settled in Bærum. Vislie had taken an education in law, and was a barrister with access to Supreme Court cases.

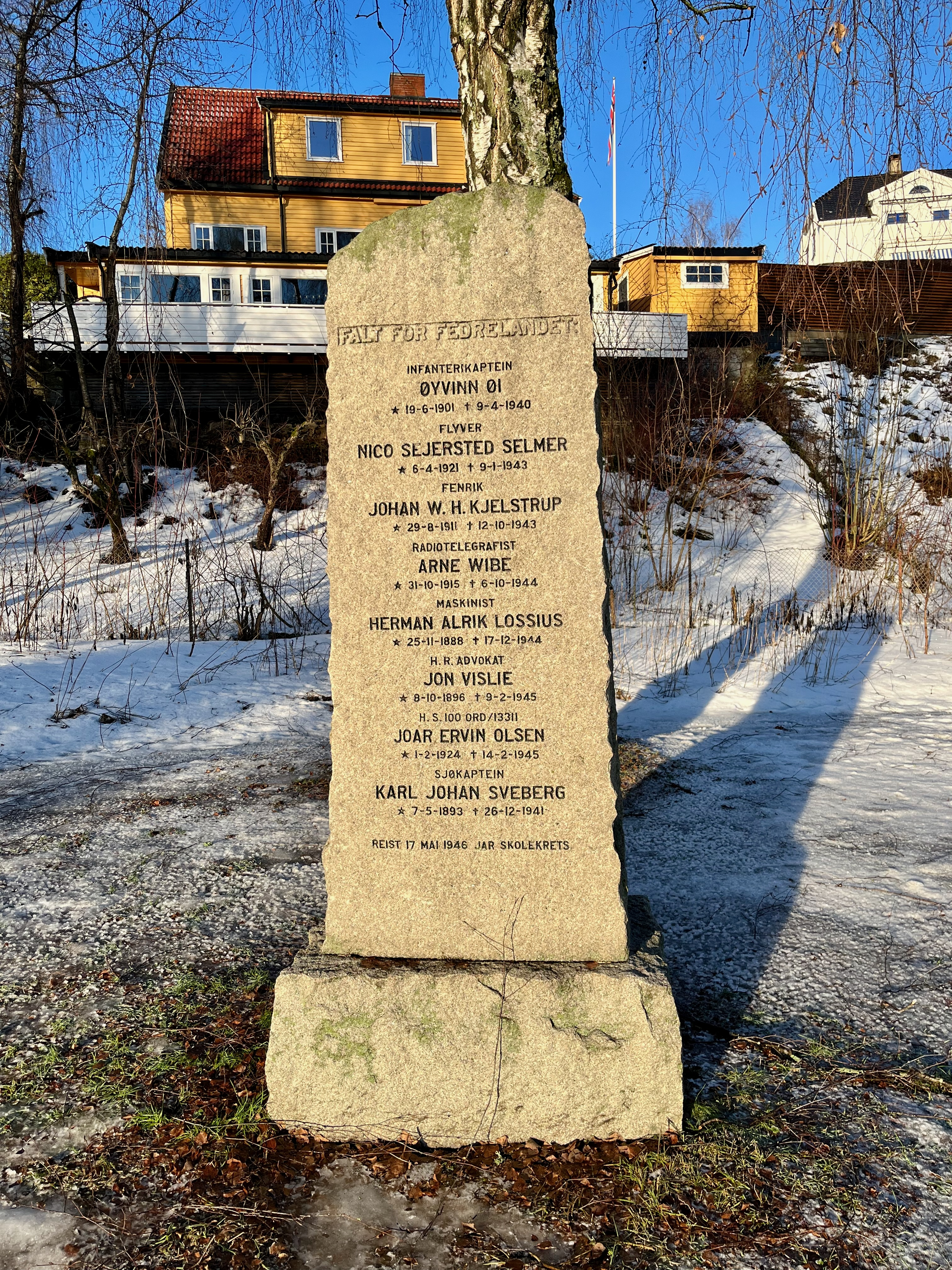
A memorial at Jar commemorates Jon Vislie, Joar Olsen, Øyvinn Øi and others.

When World War II reached Norway in 1940, Vislie eventually became an economic supporter of the Norwegian resistance movement. He also helped refugees. When the Nazi police leader Karl Marthinsen was assassinated by the Norwegian resistance on 8 February 1945, Vislie was arrested together with thirty-three others, including Carl Ferdinand Gjerdrum, Haakon Sæthre and Kaare Sundby, as a reprisal. Vislie was immediately convicted by a court-martial, and executed on Akershus Fortress on 9 February. His body was lowered in the Oslofjord.
