= Max Tau =

German-Norwegian writer, editor, and publisher

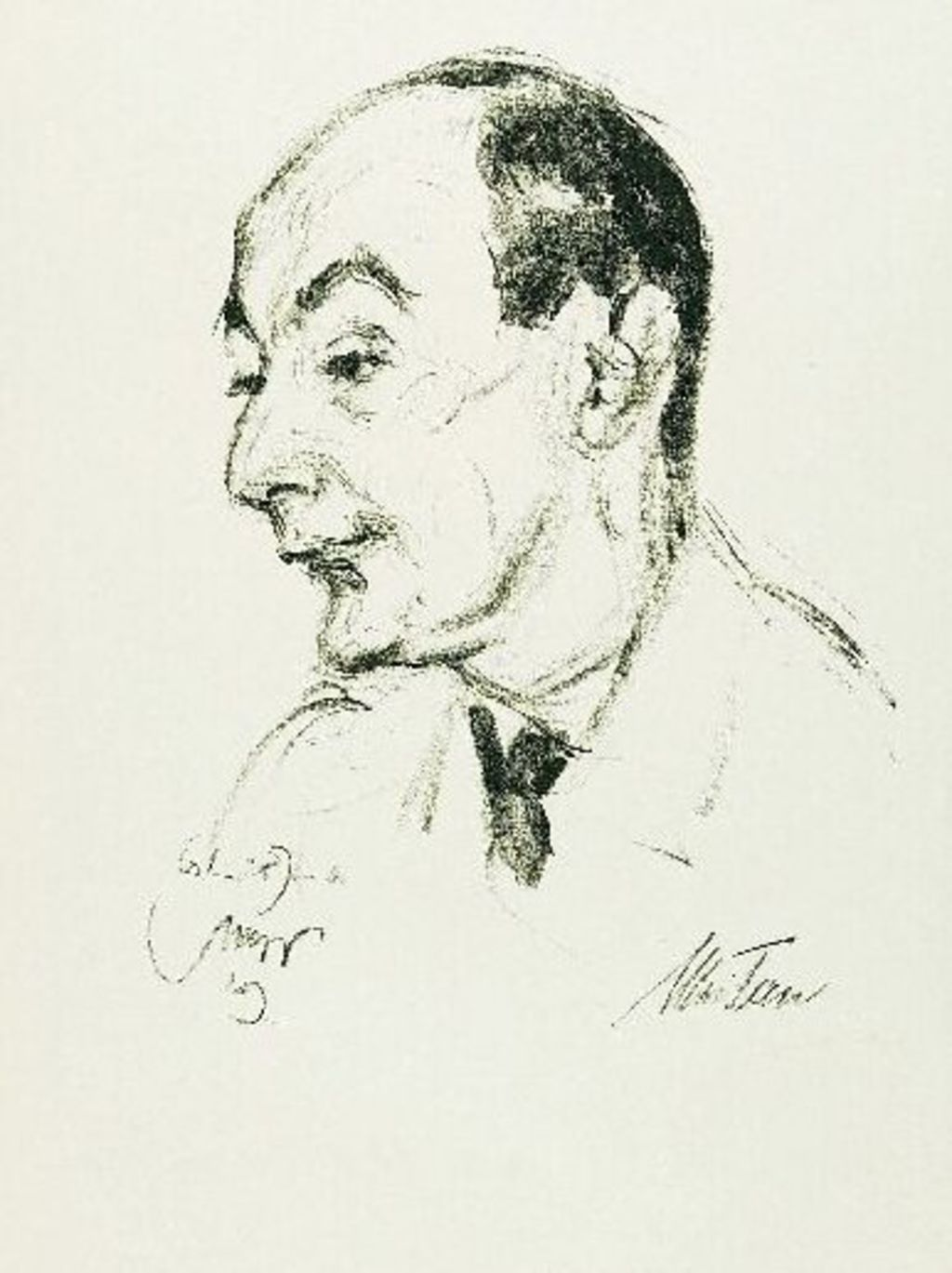
- Max Tau, the lithograph by Emil Stumpp, 1929
- Born: 19 January 1897; Bytom, Beuthen, Upper Silesia, German Empire (present-day Poland)
- Died: 13 March 1976 (aged 79); Oslo, Norway
- Education: University of Kiel
- Occupations: Publisher and writer
- Years active: 1928–1976
- Employer(s): Grundt Tanum, Aschehoug
- Known for: Building cultural relations between Norway and Germany
- Spouse: Tove Filseth
- Parent(s): Nathan Tau (1870–1941) and Julie Julius (1874–1942

Max Tau was a German–Norwegian writer, editor, and publisher.

== Life ==
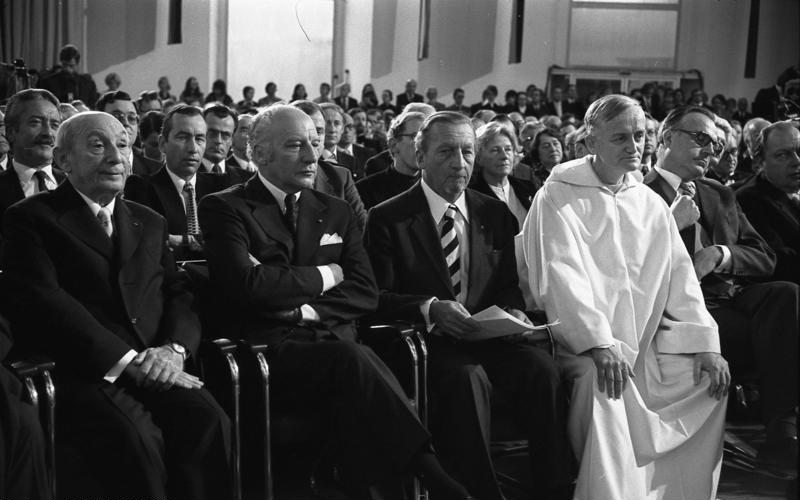
Max Tau (left) at the ceremony for Friedenspreis des Deutschen Buchhandels for Frère Roger (in white) in St. Paul's Church, Frankfurt am Main 1974. West-German president Walter Scheel is seated next to Tau. Credit: Deutsche Bundearchiv

Tau grew up in an environment characterized by what he later termed the "Jewish-German" symbiosis, in a Jewish household heavily influenced by the Jewish enlightenment. He studied literature, art history, philosophy, and psychology at universities in Berlin, Hamburg, and Kiel. He earned his doctorate at the University of Kiel, defending a dissertation on the German writer Theodor Fontane. With the assistance of Mildred Fish Harnack, an American active in the Red Orchestra anti-Nazi resistance group, Tau emigrated to Norway in 1935. During the Nazi-German occupation of Norway, he was a refugee in Sweden and returned to Norway after the war. He was noted for his contribution to promoting literary exchange between Germany and Norway, especially in the context of reconciliation after World War II. He obtained Norwegian citizenship while in exile in Sweden in 1944.

== Awards ==
- 1950 Peace Prize of the German Book Trade
- 1965 Nelly Sachs Prize
- 1970 Sonning Prize
