= Anna Maria Friman =

Swedish singer

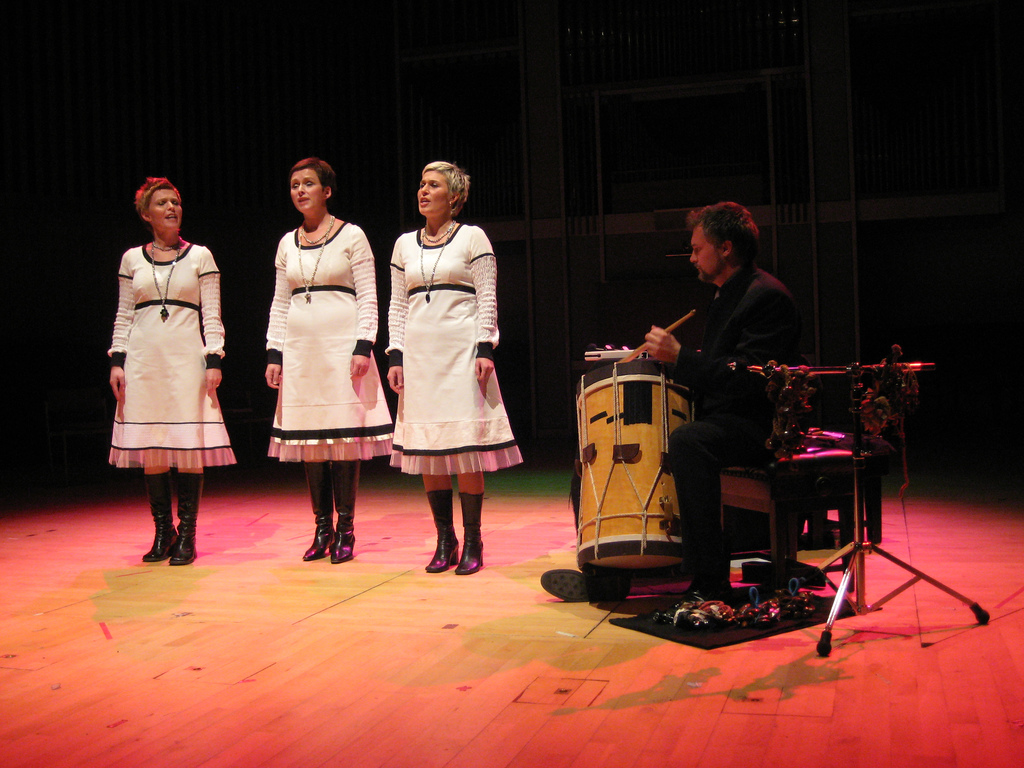
- Trio Mediaeval concert at the University of York. From left: Linn Andrea Fuglseth, Torunn Østrem Ossum, Anna Maria Friman. Birger Mistereggen on percussion.

Background information
- Born: 1972 (age 52–53)
- Genres: Medieval music
- Instruments: Voice; Hardanger fiddle
- Website: www.annamariafriman.com

Anna Maria Friman-Henriksen (born August 1972) is a Swedish singer, known as one of the members of Trio Mediaeval.

Friman studied at the Barratt Due Institute of Music in Oslo and Trinity College of Music in London, then gained a doctorate (PhD) on modern performance of mediaeval music from the University of York.

Friman has collaborated with, among others, the Gavin Bryars Ensemble, the vocal duo Red Byrd, the Ciconia Ensemble, Det Norske Solistkor, the Estonian NYYD Ensemble, the Latvian Radio Choir, Collegium Vocale Gent, Ricercar Consort and her husband, Arve Henriksen.

With Trio Mediaeval, Friman has released several albums and toured across much of the Western world.
