= Ringerikes Blad =

Norwegian newspaper

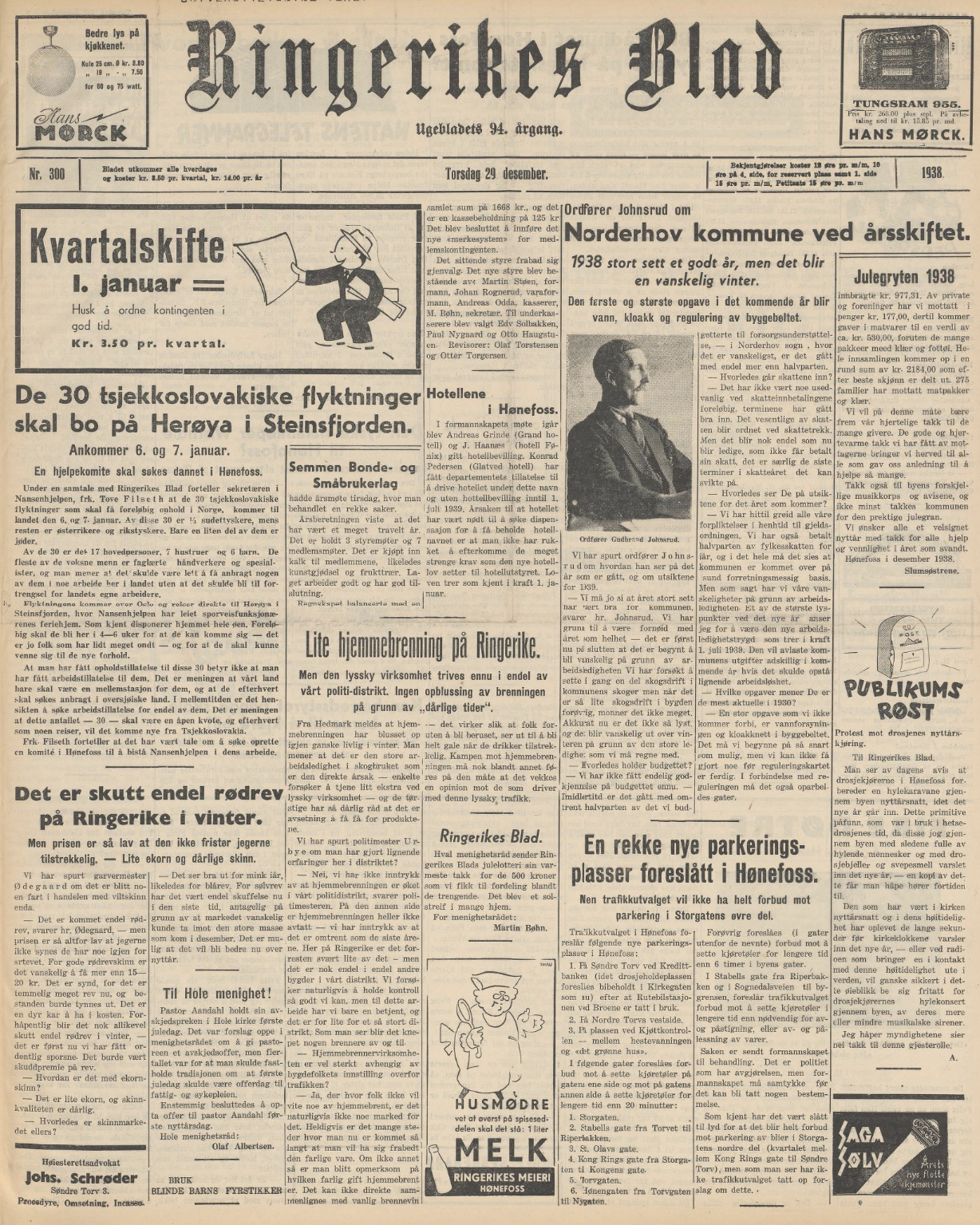
- Ringerikes Blad, 29 December 1938
- Type: Daily newspaper
- Owner: Amedia
- Founded: 1845
- Circulation: 12684
- Website: www.ringblad.no

Ringerikes Blad (English: Ringerike's Newspaper) is a local newspaper published in Hønefoss, Norway.

Johan Jørgen Krohn founded Ringerikes Blad in 1845. It covers Ringerike, Hole and Jevnaker. It has a circulation of 12684, of whom 12227 are subscribers.

Ringerikes Blad is published by the company A-pressen Lokale Medier AS, which in turn is owned 100% by Amedia (formerly known as A-press), one of the largest media companies in Norway.
