= Bent Patey =

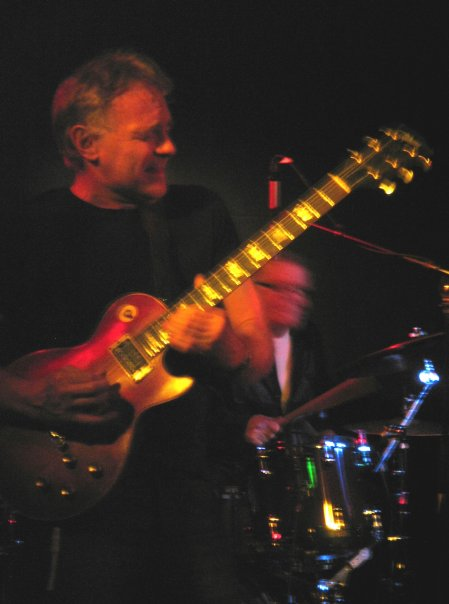

Background information
- Born: 12 June 1952 (age 74); Oslo
- Origin: English
- Genres: Blues; Jazz fusion
- Occupations: Musician, composer, writer
- Instrument: Guitar
- Years active: 1970 - present
- Labels: EMI Records; Sonet Records; Polygram Records

Bent Patey (born 12 June 1952 in Oslo, Norway) is an English-Norwegian guitarist, composer and writer. He grew out of the environment around Club 7, and with a background in groups like Bazar, Susanne Fuhr Band, Lotus and Bryggerigangen Bluesband.

== Biography ==
Patey has contributed on more than 40 albums. In the 1980s he toured Norway with his own band PATEYs PIPE. Together with the keyboarder Brynjulf Blix, bassist Geir Holmsen and drummer Bjørn Jenssen as the first lineup. Later many other renown Norwegian artists have been on the list.

== Discography (in selection) ==
=== Solo albums ===
- 1982: Ocean Front Walk (EMI), nominated for the Spellemannprisen as this years composer, including with Sidsel Endresen, Lynni Treekrem, Sigurd Køhn, Morten Halle, Torbjørn Sunde, Jon Christensen

=== Collaborations ===
With Bazar

- 1974: Drabantbyrock (Plateselskapet Mai)

With Bryggerigangen Bluesband

- 1979: Blått Brygg (Plateselskapet Mai)

With Bang 85

- 1985: The Further You Go (Spider Records), with Håkon Iversen, Brynjulf Blix, Øivind Madsen, Paolo Vinaccia among others
