= Susanne Fuhr =

Norwegian jazz musician (born 1953)

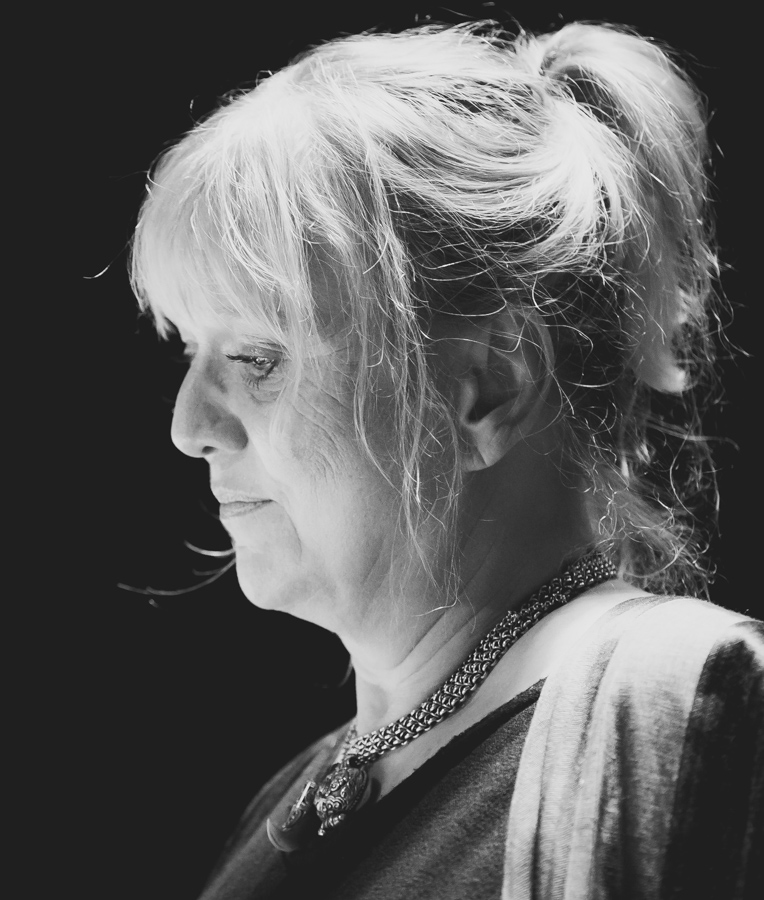
- Fuhr in 2017

Background information
- Born: 13 June 1953 (age 73)
- Origin: Oslo, Norway
- Genres: Vocal jazz
- Occupations: Musician, composer

Susanne Fuhr (born 13 June 1953) is a Norwegian jazz vocalist, cabaret artist and actor, known from her own S.F. Band in the 1970s.

== Biography ==
Fuhr was born in Oslo. The first edition of her Band comprised guitarist Bent Patey, pianist Rune Klakegg, bassist Åge Røthe and drummer Bjørn Jenssen, but the breakthrough was with the next edition which consisted of keyboarder Brynjulf Blix, saxophonist Arne Frang, bassist and guitarist Sveinung Hovensjø and drummer Svein Christiansen at the 1979 Moldejazz. She also had a S.F. Quartet with pianist Dag Arnesen, bassist Bjørn Kjellemyr and drummer Svein Christiansen performing at the 1982 Nattjazz in Bergen.

She was also part of musical plays like Dans Med Oss Gud, and with Ove Thue, Sigvart Dagsland, Gudny Aspaas among others, she released the album Dans Med Oss Gud (1982), with lyrics by Erik Hillestad. Furthermore, she appeared in the play Stopp Verden, Jeg Vil Av at Soria Moria Theater (1986) and the musical play Annie 2 at the Chateau Neuf (2005). She released the album Don't Explain (1991) together with Odd Børretzen, with musical contributions by Dag Arnesen and Olaf Kamfjord, based on the play Billie Holiday På Grønland Torg also shown at the NRK 1991.

She took part in the 1983 and 1986 Melodi Grand Prix, and participated in TV show Fortuna (1993), Morsarvet (1993) and Hem Til Byn (1999). She wrote lyrics for the music of Kurt Weill, performed in trio with pianist Olga Konkova and bassist Per Mathisen (2005). She was also central to the monologue Umettelig, assisted by accordion player Espen Leite.

Fuhr has also set the voices to Edna Mode in the animated movie De Utrolige, the Hearts Queen in the Disney film Alice in Wonderland, and Asajj Ventress in the TV series Clone Wars (Star Wars).

== Discography (in selection) ==
=== Solo albums ===
- 1981: Domino (Polydor)
- 1983: Sister, You Ain't Had The Blues (Sandvika Storband), with Sandvika Storband featuring Susanne Fuhr
- 1991: Don't Explain - En Gave Fra Billie Holiday (Bergen Digital Studio), with Odd Børretzen

=== Collaborations ===
- 1982: Dans Med Oss Gud (Kirkelig Kulturverksted), Musical play
