= Erik Balke =

Norwegian jazz saxophonist (born 1953)

- Born: 7 November 1953 (age 72); Oslo, Norway
- Genres: Jazz
- Occupations: Musician, band leader, composer, saxophonist
- Instrument: Saxophones

Erik Balke (born 7 November 1953) is a Norwegian jazz musician (saxophone), known as leader of the "Lille Frøen Saksofonkvartett" with Vidar Johansen, Arne Frang and Odd Riisnæs/Tore Brunborg/Olav Dale, as member of his younger brother Jon Balke's early orchestras, and for cooperations with Don Cherry, Ed Blackwell, Per Jørgensen, Audun Kleive, Nils Petter Molvær, Torbjørn Sunde, Tore Brunborg, Paolo Vinaccia, and Bugge Wesseltoft.

== Career ==
Balke was born in Oslo. In 1973–94 he worked with his brother, Jon Balke. He studied at the University of Oslo, where he was a member of the big band, and at Berklee School of Music in Boston (1977–79).

He played with the Carl Morten Iversen Trio (1980–81), the Gambian/Norwegian Friendship Orchestra (1982), with Miki N'Doye in E'Olen and Tamma (Finn Sletten, Miki N'Doye, Per Jørgensen & Sveinung Hovensjø), and established Lille Frøen Saksofonkvartett (1979–89), played with Jazzpunkensemblet (1983–), Oslo 13 og Extended Noise (1983–94). He also chaired the Foreningen norske jazzmusikere before he moved to Berlin. Back in Norway, he participated in Baktruppen and Ignore. He and Jon Balke composed the commissioned work Palmevinsdrankeren for the Kongsberg Jazz Festival (1984).

Balke was part of the band E'Olen with Jon Balke, Miki N'doye (percussion), Sveinung Hovensjø (bass), Finn Sletten (drums), and Zakhir Helge Linaae (percussion).

== Discography ==
- E'Olen (Mai, 1979), with E'Olen
- Tamma (Odin, 1985), Tamma with Don Cherry & Ed Blackwell
- 4 menn (Odin, 1986), with Lille Frøen Saksofonkvartett
- Off Balance (Odin, 1988), with Oslo 13
- Joko with Miki N'Doye Orchestra feat. Paolo Vinaccia, Bugge Wesseltoft, Solo Cissokho & Jon Balke (2002)
