= Extended Noise =

Norwegian jazz ensemble

- Origin: Trondheim, Norway
- Genres: Jazz; Jazz-rock
- Years active: 1982–1992
- Labels: Hot Club Records; Odin Records
- Members: Erik Balke; Eivin One Pedersen; Carl Morten Iversen; Audun Kleive

Extended Noise (established 1982) was a Norwegian Jazz Quintet. Their first album Keep nose in front (1984) under the name AHA was released after an acclaimed appearance at Moldejazz 1983, followed by the Extended nose album Jamaha (1986) where Alnes was substituted for Klakegg. The change of name was due to the competition from the Norwegian pop band "a-ha". The last record was Slow but Sudden – Langsam, aber Plötzlich (Odin Records, 1990), in the US on Cadence Jazz Records 1992), now as Extended Noise as a Quartet without guitars and with compositions by One Pedersen for the most.

== Band members ==
- Erik Balke - saxophone
- Eivin One Pedersen - piano, celeste and harmonium
- Carl Morten Iversen - bass
- Audun Kleive - drums

== Additional members ==
- Frode Alnæs - guitar
- Bjørn Klakegg - guitar

== Discography ==
- Keep nose in front (Hot Club Records, 1984), as "AHA"
- Jamaha (Circulasione Totale, 1986)
- Slow but Sudden – Langsam, aber Plötzlich (Odin Records, 1990)
