= Odyssey (Terje Rypdal album) =

Studio album by Terje Rypdal
- Released: 1975
- Recorded: August 1975
- Studio: Arne Bendiksen Studio; Oslo, Norway
- Genre: Jazz
- Length: 87:13
- Label: ECM 1067/68 ST (1975); ECM 1067 (1994); ECM 2136/38 (2012)
- Producer: Manfred Eicher

Terje Rypdal chronology
Whenever I Seem to Be Far Away (1974)	Odyssey (1975)	After the Rain (1976)

Odyssey is the fifth album by Norwegian jazz guitarist Terje Rypdal, recorded in August 1975 and released on ECM later that year. The quintet features trombonist Torbjørn Sunde, and rhythm section Brynjulf Blix, Sveinung Hovensjø and Svein Christiansen.

== Reception ==
The AllMusic review by Michael P. Dawson awarded the album 4½ stars calling it a "[magnificent] effort that combines crushingly powerful rock/jazz with long, brooding electric ruminations."

Professional ratings
Review scores
Source	Rating
Allmusic	4.5/5 stars
The Rolling Stone Jazz Record Guide	3/5 stars

== Track listing ==
=== Original release – ECM 1067/68 ST ===
All tracks are written by Terje Rypdal.

Side I
No.	Title	Length
1.	"Darkness Falls"	3:33
2.	"Midnite"	16:45
Total length:		20:18

Side II
No.	Title	Length
1.	"Adagio"	13:16
2.	"Better Off Without You"	7:37
Total length:		20:53

Side III
No.	Title	Length
1.	"Over Birkerot"	4:48
2.	"Fare Well"	11:25
3.	"Ballade"	5:55
Total length:		22:08

Side IV
No.	Title	Length
1.	"Rolling Stone"	23:54
Total length:		23:54 87:13

=== 1994 CD reissue – ECM 1067/68 ST ===
All tracks are written by Terje Rypdal.

No.	Title	Length
1.	"Darkness Falls"	3:33
2.	"Midnite"	16:45
3.	"Adagio"	13:16
4.	"Better Off Without You"	7:37
5.	"Over Birkerot"	4:48
6.	"Fare Well"	11:25
7.	"Ballade"	5:55

=== Odyssey: In Studio & In Concert (3xCD) 2012 – ECM 2136-38 ===
All tracks are written by Terje Rypdal.

Disc one
No.	Title	Length
1.	"Darkness Falls"	3:33
2.	"Midnite"	16:45
3.	"Adagio"	13:16
4.	"Better Off Without You"	7:37

Disc two
No.	Title	Length
1.	"Over Birkerot"	4:48
2.	"Fare Well"	11:25
3.	"Ballade"	5:55
4.	"Rolling Stone"	23:54

Disc three: Unfinished Highballs
No.	Title	Length
1.	"Unfinished Highballs"	3:52
2.	"The Golden Eye"	14:04
3.	"Scarlet Mistress"	12:25
4.	"Dawn"	12:29
5.	"Dine and Dance to the Music of the Waves"	11:40
6.	"Talking Back"	7:10
7.	"Bright Lights Big City"	6:15

- Unfinished Highballs is a previously unreleased live recording from 1976

== Personnel ==
- Terje Rypdal – guitar, mellotron, soprano saxophone
- Torbjørn Sunde – trombone
- Brynjulf Blix – organ
- Sveinung Hovensjø – electric bass
- Svein Christiansen – drums
