= What Comes After =

What Comes After may refer to:

- What Comes After (album), an album by Terje Rypdal
- What Comes After (The Walking Dead), an episode of the television series The Walking Dead
- What Comes After, an album by The Honeydogs
