= After the Rain (Terje Rypdal album) =

Studio album by Terje Rypdal
- Released: 1976
- Recorded: August 1976
- Studios: Talent Studios; Oslo, Norway
- Genre: Jazz
- Length: 38:09
- Label: ECM 1083 ST
- Producer: Manfred Eicher

Terje Rypdal chronology
Odyssey (1975)	After the Rain (1976)	Waves (1977)

After the Rain is the sixth album by Norwegian jazz guitarist Terje Rypdal, recorded in August 1976 and released on the ECM later that same year, featuring singer and then-wife Inger Lise Rypdal.

== Reception ==
The AllMusic review awarded the album 4 stars.

Professional ratings
Review scores
Source	Rating
AllMusic	4/5 stars
The Rolling Stone Jazz Record Guide	3/5 stars

== Track listing ==
All tracks are written by Terje Rypdal.

Side I
No.	Title	Length
1.	"Autumn Breeze"	4:36
2.	"Air"	4:28
3.	"Now and Then"	2:53
4.	"Wind"	1:26
5.	"After the Rain"	6:08
Total length:		19:31

Side II
No.	Title	Length
1.	"Kjare Maren"	4:12
2.	"Little Bell"	1:38
3.	"Vintage Year"	3:49
4.	"Multer"	2:55
5.	"Like a Child, Like a Song"	6:04
Total length:		18:38 38:09

== Personnel ==
- Terje Rypdal – acoustic guitar, electric guitar, synthesizer, piano, electric piano, soprano saxophone, flute, bells, tubular bells
- Inger Lise Rypdal – vocals
