= Alex Naumik =

Norwegian singer

Alexandra Naumik
- Also known as: Alex; Alexandra Sandøy
- Born: 12 August 1949; Vilnius, Lithuanian SSR (now Lithuania)
- Died: 17 September 2013 (aged 64); Oslo, Norway
- Genres: Pop; Rock; Funk; Disco
- Years active: 1966 - 2013
- Labels: Polydor; RCA
- Website: AlexMusic.com

Alexandra Naumik (formerly Alexandra Sandøy; 12 August 1949 – 17 September 2013), better known by her stage name Alex, was a Lithuanian-born, Polish-Norwegian rock and pop artist who rose to fame in the late 1970s.

== Biography ==
Naumik was born in 1949 to Polish parents in Vilnius, Lithuanian SSR. During the Stalinist era she was deported to Siberia together with her family and only arrived in Poland 6 years later. With her talented voice, spanning more than four octaves, Naumik won several competitions and prizes while still a teenager and recorded records with renowned artists such as Agnieszka Osiecka and Adam Slawinski. Having graduated from the Pedagogy Institute in Łódź in 1969, she moved to Norway in 1970 after marrying Norwegian film director Haakon Sandøy.

Following her move to Norway, Naumik resumed her music career, adopting the stage name Alex. The stage name itself was created and given by writer Jens Bjørneboe, who dedicated on his novel "Powderhouse" (Kruttårnet in Norw.) - «To little Alex from old Jens». Her eponymous 1977 debut album launched funk-rock in Norway while her album received both critical acclaim and the Norwegian Album of the Year award, also selling to both silver and gold records. Her first band, also named "Alex", was formed in 1976 together with Bjørn Christiansen, Svein Gundersen (from the earlier noted Rock group Aunt Mary), Brynjulf Blix and Per Ivar Johansen.

She was also the first Norwegian artist to sign international recording contracts in 1977 with PolyGram International (now Universal Music Group) and in 1978 with RCA Records, working with artists such as David Foster, Andrae Crouch, Andy Summers and Glen Matlock. In addition to performing all over the world, Alex was also given her own television special in the German Musikladen series, which was viewed by 20 million people in over 18 countries worldwide.

During the early 80s, Naumik took part in Melodi Grand Prix, the Norwegian national finals of the Eurovision Song Contest, on four occasions, with her third place in 1980 as her best result. That same year, she and her band were involved in a bus crash, which killed her drummer, Per Ivar Johansen, and seriously injured several other members.

Following the peak of her popularity in the mid-80s, Naumik gradually turned to producing records and writing material for other artists, spending several years working in both the United States and Japan, before returning to Norway in the early 2000s. During this time, Naumik only released two albums herself, in 1991 and -93. Her most recent success was her work with Swedish-born artist Leana's album Faith, which reached number one on the Billboard charts in June 2006 and January 2007. She contributed as a writer and producer along with her daughter, Naomi Naumik, and her collaborator for 25 years, Grammy winner Atle Bakken.

In October 2008, Naumik began re-releasing her recordings, both digitally and on CD, marking her debut on iTunes, Spotify, and her own website. At the same time, several brand new recordings and remixes were released.

During her lifetime, Naumik received several international prizes and distinctions in addition to national ones. These have included the "Nordring" prize in Helsinki (1981), Spellemansprisen, the Norwegian Grammy (1977), for two albums, and being voted "Female Artist of the Year" by the readers of Det Nye magazine in 1980

=== Image ===
Alex also became renowned as a trend-setter in several areas ("Alex-hair" was a common expression) and she became the first female artist in Norway to take full control over her music, personal and public image at a time when an independent female artist was unusual. As she was also a pioneer in co-operation between the music and commercial sector and became a spokesperson for Helen Curtis Shampoos, BASF, Levi's and Ford Motor Company amongst others.

=== Personal life and death ===
Naumik married Norwegian film director Haakon Sandøy in 1969, but they later divorced. She spent most of her life, including her final years, in Oslo, but also lived in USA, Japan and Sweden. On 17 September 2013 Naumik was found dead in her Oslo apartment. She was 64.

== Discography ==
=== Solo albums ===
- Alex (Mercury, 1977)
- Handle With Care (Mercury, 1977)
- Hello, I Love You (Mercury, 1979)
- Daddy’s Child (Polydor, 1980)
- Alex’ beste (Polydor, 1981) (compilation)
- Always (CBS, 1983)
- Almost (Ventura Records, 1991)
- Living In Color (MTG, 1993)

=== Singles ===
- Heartbreak Queen (1977)
- Listen To The Music (1978)
- Flying High (1978)
- Rock Machine (1979)
- Univers (1980)
- Rock'N'Roller (1981)
- I Love Warszawa (1982)
- Dreamboy (1984)
- Don't Break down My Heart (1984)
- Almost (1991)
- Home Is Where The Hatred Is (2008)
- I Wanna Fly (2008)
