= Øivind Elgenes =

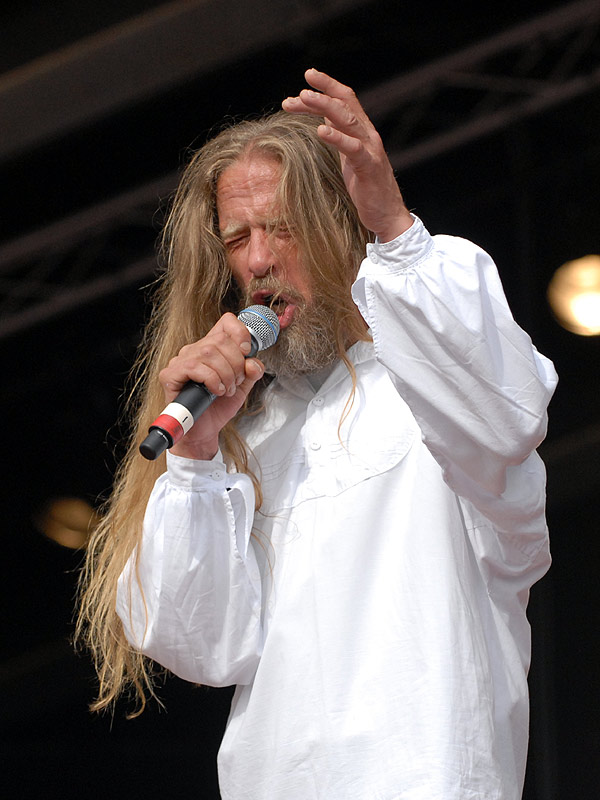
- Øivind Elgenes during a performance with the band Dance with a Stranger. (Photo: Bjarte Hetland)

Background information
- Also known as: Elg
- Born: 13 February 1958 (age 67); Kristiansund, Norway
- Genres: Pop music
- Occupations: Musician, composer
- Instruments: Vocals, guitar
- Member of: Dance with a Stranger
- Website: www.elgsinverden.com

Øivind Elgenes alias "Elg" (born 13 February 1958 in Kristiansund, Norway) is a Norwegian vocalist, guitarist and composer, known from a series of recordings and as front figure of the Norwegian band Dance with a Stranger.

== Career ==
Elgenes was raised in Kristiansund together with musicians Lynni Treekrem and Frode Alnæs. With the latter he started the pop band Dance with a Stranger in 1984, and they released five albums. His first solo album Som første gang (1997) showed Elgenes from another side, with Norwegian lyrics. His next solo project Remembrance (2000) was the exact opposite. Here he sings classic songs with English lyrics, accompanied by piano, sound effects and a chamber orchestra. In 2002 he started a new trio called "AcousticMusicMachine" with Inge Bævre (guitar) and Eivind Gjelberg (percussion). The music ranged from the more show-like the driving blues and soul, and most of it was self-composed material with Norwegian lyrics. The follow-up was the solo album The Way Life Goes (2004) continued six years later with the last album Storm (2010). In 2013 he released his latest album Lucky One. This time his record was given some great critics and airplay. From 2013 he has been playing concerts with his own band ELGband.

== Discography ==
=== Solo albums ===
- 1997: Som første gang (Simax Classics)
- 2000: Remembrance (Simax Classics)
- 2004: The Way Life Goes (Grappa Music)
- 2010: Storm
- 2013: Lucky One

=== Collaborations ===
With Dance with a Stranger

- 1987: Dance with a Stranger (Norsk Plateproduksjon)
- 1989: To / Fool's Paradise (Norsk Plateproduksjon/RCA)
- 1991: Atmosphere (Norsk Plateproduksjon/RCA)
- 1994: Look What You've Done (Norsk Plateproduksjon)
- 1994: Unplugged (Norsk Plateproduksjon)
- 1995: The Best of Dance with a Stranger (Norsk Plateproduksjon)
- 1998: Happy Sounds (Mercury)
- 2007: Everyone Needs a Friend... The Very Best Of (Universal Music)
