= Eivin One Pedersen =

Norwegian jazz accordionist and pianist

- Born: 8 September 1956; Stavanger, Rogaland, Norway
- Died: 22 February 2012 (aged 55) Stavanger, Rogaland
- Genres: Jazz
- Occupations: Musician, band leader
- Instruments: Accordion, piano

Eivin One Pedersen (8 September 1956 – 22 February 2012) was a Norwegian jazz musician (accordion and piano) from Stavanger, Norway.

== Career ==
One Pedersen played in the trio Detail, together with Frode Gjerstad (saxophone) and John Stevens (drums) from 1981, and released several albums on the free jazz company Circulasione Totale. Here he also published his own debut album Solo mio! (1981). In 1984 he released the album I 1984 utga han platen Keep Nose in Front, with his former group, Aha! The band name created confusion when another famous pop trio debuting with the same name almost at the same time. Later they changed the name to Extended Noise in 1986 and released several albums. Another project was the band Calling Signals, where he collaborated with Paal Nilssen-Love (drums), Frode Gjerstad (saxophone) and Nick Stephens (bass).

One Pedersen played with Terje Isungset on his performance at Vossajazz 2003. He released a duo album with Katja Medbøe, Ett bein på jorda, ett i himmelen – helt korrekt (1992), with poems by Rolf Jacobsen, and performed with Erik Balke (1996). More recently, he played on the debut album Heaveny attack (2004) by Randi Tytingvåg, as well as Villhund (2006) by Elin Furubotn.

One Pedersen was a member of the expert jury for Melodi Grand Prix 1979, led the Association Norwegian jazz musicians for some time, and composed the commissioned work Ein med alt for the MaiJazz 1996.

== Discography ==
=== His own projects ===
Solo albums

- 1984: Solo mio! (Loose Torque)

With A-Ha/Extended Noise

- 1984: Keep Nose in Front (Hot Club Records)

Duo with Katja Medbøe

- 1992: Ett bein på jorda, ett i himmelen. Helt korrekt (Kirkelig Kulturverksted)

With Calling Signals

- 1998: Calling Signals (Loose Torque)
- 2002: Dreams in Dreams (FMR Records)
- 2005: Live in the UK (FMR Records)
- 2009: From Cafe Oto (Loose Torque)
- 2011: From Cafe Sting (Loose Torque)
- 2011: A Winter's Tour (Loose Torque)

=== Collaborations ===
With Ciwan Haco

- 1994: Dûrî (Ses)

With Morten Abel

- 2003: Being Everything, Knowing Nothing (Virgin, EMI Music)

With Frode Gjerstad & Kevin Norton

- 2006: The Walk (FMR Records)
