= Inger Lise Rypdal =

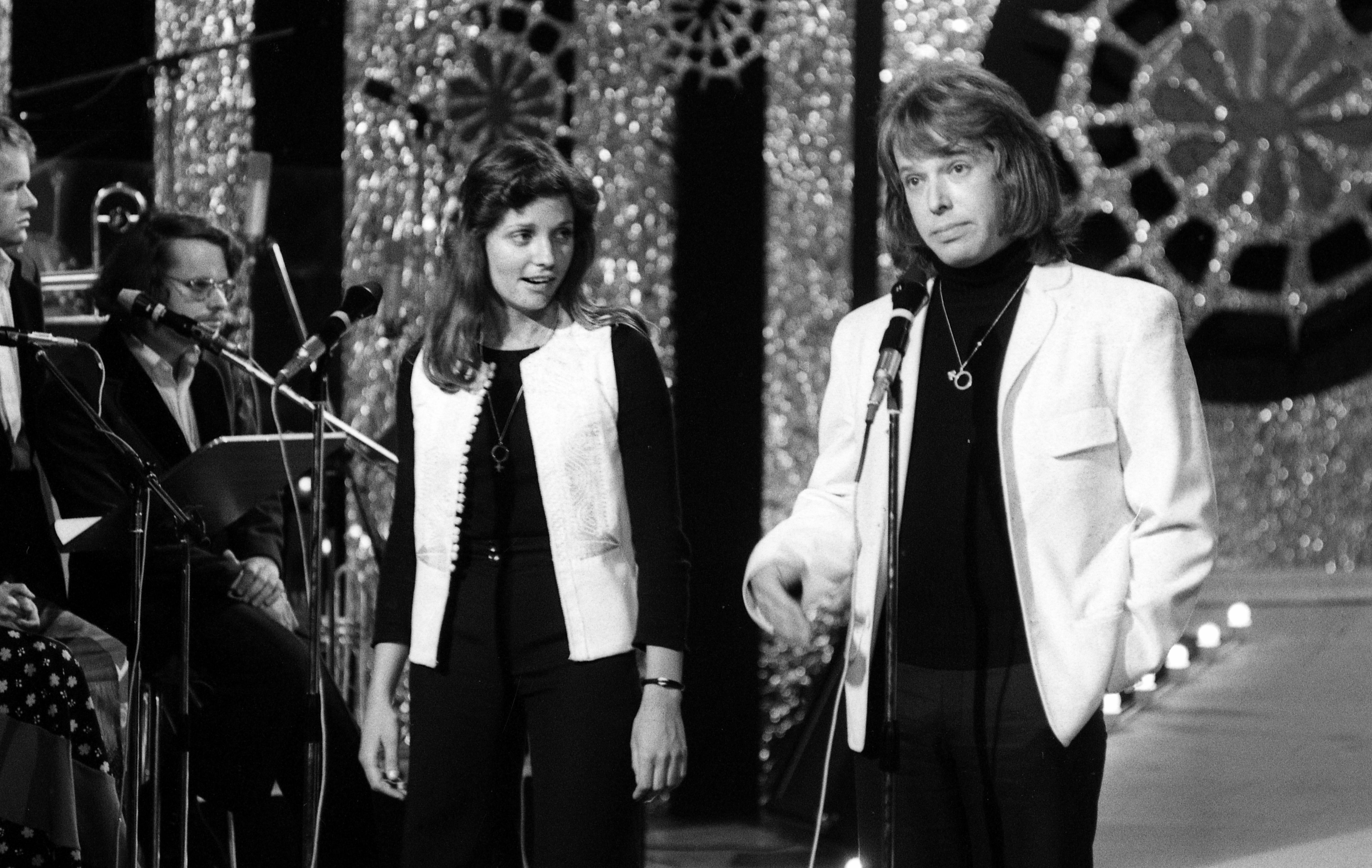
- Rypdal with Stein Ingebrigtsen in 1974.

Background information
- Born: Inger Lise Andersen; 14 December 1949 (age 76); Lena, Østre Toten, Norway
- Genres: Pop
- Occupations: Musician, composer
- Instrument: Vocals

Inger Lise Rypdal (born 14 December 1949) is a Norwegian singer and actress in several different genres: pop, rock, theater, film, and musical. She is the sister of singer Maj Britt Andersen and was married (1969–1985) to guitarist and composer Terje Rypdal.

== Biography ==
Inger Lise Rypdal (originally Inger Lise Andersen) was born in Lena, and has been performing since 1968. She has made 16 albums in Norway and some in Sweden, acted in several theatre performances, nine movies and participated in the Norwegian heats of the Eurovision Song Contest, the Melodi Grand Prix, 10 times: 1969 (as Inger Lise Andersen with Eventyr), 1972 (Lillebror), 1973 (with two songs: Alternativ, with Ola Neegaard, Gro Anita Schønn & Stein Ingebrigtsen, Å for et spill), 1976 (with Jahn Teigen, Voodoo), 1979 (Så lenge du er hos meg), 1980 (Svart fortid), 1981 (Tankar), 1982 (Lady Di), 1983 (with Freddy Dahl, Elegi), 1984 (Vindar). Together with Øystein Wiik, she has done several musical concerts all around Norway.

She started with soul music together with Geir Wentzel, and she has often returned to soul, for instance in the band Chipahua with some of the best Norwegian artists. In La Mome Piaf, the audience experienced Inger Lise Rypdal acting parts of Edith Piaf's life. All the well known songs were tied together with short stories from Piaf's life.

== Discography ==
=== Solo albums ===
- Inger Lise (RCA, 1970)
- Hello-A (RCA, 1972) with Stein Ingebrigtsen
- Sjung bort bekymren (RCA Sweden, 1972)
- Har du nånsinn... (RCA Sweden, 1973)
- Fra 4 til 70 (Talent, 1973) (CD 1993)
- 830 S – bak sølvmikrofonen (Talent, 1974) with Stein Ingebrigtsen
- Einar Schankes Gledeshus (Camp, 1974)
- Den stille gaten (Talent, 1974)
- Jag kommer tillbaka (RCA Sweden, 1975)
- Feeling (Talent, 1975)
- Tider kommer, tider går (Talent, 1977)
- Før og nå. 15 store suksesser 1973–79 (Talent, 1979)
- Inger Lise Rypdal (RCA Sweden, 1979)
- Sign Language (Talent, 1980)
- Songwriters for the Stars/Barry Mann & Cynthia Weill/David Foster (Mercury, 1982)
- Kontakt (Talent, 1982)
- Just For You (Studio B, 1983)
- Å, jul med din glede (Arco, 1986)
- Till min kära (Studio B, 1987)
- Enkel resa (Sonet Sweden, 1988) .
- Romanse (Agentus, 1988), with Lakki Patey
- Fru Johnsen (Crema, 1989)
- Tid (Talent, 1997)
- Inger Lise (Master Music, 2001)
- Ansikter (Kirkelig Kulturverksted, 2007), with Marius Rypdal

=== Albums featured ===
With Terje Rypdal

- Terje Rypdal (ECM, 1971)
- After the Rain (ECM, 1976)

== Melodi Grand Prix entries ==
- Eventyr (1969)
- Lillebror(1972)
- Å for et spill with Stein Ingebrigtsen, Ola Neegård, Gro Anita Schønn(1973)
- Alternativ with Lillian Harriett (1975)
- Yo-yo with Stein Ingebrigtsen(1974)
- Voodoo with Jahn Teigen (1976)
- Så lenge du er hos meg (1979)
- Svart fortid (1980)
- Tanker (1981)
- Født på ny [as a member of Group Darlings] (1981)
- Lady Di (1982)
- Elegi with Freddy Dahl (1983)
- Vinder (1984)
