= Jazzpunkensemblet =

- Origin: Oslo, Norway
- Genres: Jazz; Big band
- Years active: 1983–present
- Labels: Odin Records, Curling Legs
- Members: Jon Eberson; Nils Petter Molvær; Torbjørn Sunde; Erik Balke; Tore Brunborg; Morten Halle; Pål Thowsen; Bjørn Jenssen; Paolo Vinaccia; Christian Wallumrød; Bugge Wesseltoft; Bjørn Kjellemyr; Tom Erik Antonsen
- Past members: Jon Balke; Geir Holmsen; Jon Christensen

Jazzpunkensemblet (established 1983 in Oslo, Norway) is a Norwegian jazz ensemble orchestra led by the famous musicians Jon Eberson on guitar and Nils Petter Molvær on trumpet, and known for a clean style duel between two rhythm sections, and the two records Live At Rockefeller (1991) and Thirteen Rounds (1998), presenting compositions by Jon Eberson.

They visited a series of festivals and concert halls in the 1990s, among them the 1998 Moldejazz.

== Band members ==
Woodwinds

- Erik Balke – saxophone
- Tore Brunborg – saxophone
- Morten Halle – saxophone

Brass

- Nils Petter Molvær – trumpet
- Torbjørn Sunde – trombone

Rhythm section

- Jon Eberson – guitar
- Christian Wallumrød – keyboards
- Bugge Wesseltoft – keyboards
- Bjørn Kjellemyr – double bass
- Tom Erik Antonsen – bass
- Pål Thowsen – drums
- Bjørn Jenssen – drums
- Paolo Vinaccia – drums

Past members

- Jon Balke – piano, keyboards
- Geir Holmsen – bass
- Jon Christensen – drums

== Discography ==
- 1991: Live At Rockefeller (Odin Records)
- 1998: Thirteen Rounds (Curling Legs)
