= Whenever I Seem to Be Far Away =

Studio album by Terje Rypdal
- Released: 1974
- Recorded: 1974
- Studio: Arne Bendiksen Studio; Oslo, Norway; Tonstudio Bauer; Ludwigsburg, W. Germany
- Genre: Jazz
- Length: 37:04
- Label: ECM 1045 ST
- Producer: Manfred Eicher

Terje Rypdal chronology
What Comes After (1973)	Whenever I Seem to Be Far Away (1974)	Odyssey (1975)

Whenever I Seem to Be Far Away is the fourth solo album by Norwegian jazz guitarist Terje Rypdal, recorded in 1974 and released on ECM that same year. The A-side features a quintet consisting French horn player Odd Ulleberg and rhythm section Pete Knutsen, Sveinung Hovensjø and Jon Christensen; the B-side features Rypdal backed by the Südfunk Symphony Orchestra conducted by Mladen Gutesha.

== Reception ==
The AllMusic review awarded the album 2 stars.

Professional ratings
Review scores
Source	Rating
AllMusic	2/5 stars
The Rolling Stone Jazz Record Guide	3/5 stars

== Track listing ==
All tracks are written by Terje Rypdal

Side I
No.	Title	Length
1.	"Silver Bird Is Heading for the Sun"	14:05
2.	"The Hunt"	5:18
Total length:		19:23

Side II
No.	Title	Length
1.	"Whenever I Seem to Be Far Away"	17:37
Total length:		17:27 36:50

== Personnel ==
=== Side I (Oslo) ===
- Terje Rypdal – guitar, electric guitar
- Odd Ulleberg – French horn
- Pete Knutsen – mellotron, electric piano
- Sveinung Hovensjø – 6 string bass, electric bass
- Jon Christensen – percussion

=== Side II (Ludwigsburg) ===
- Terje Rypdal – guitar, electric guitar
- Mladen Gutesha – conductor
  - Südfunk Symphony Orchestra
    - Soloists:
      - Helmut Geiger – violin
      - Christian Hedrich – viola
