= Waves (Terje Rypdal album) =

Studio album by Terje Rypdal
- Released: 1978
- Recorded: September 1977
- Studio: Talent Studio; Oslo, Norway
- Genre: Jazz
- Length: 40:55
- Label: ECM 1110 ST
- Producer: Manfred Eicher

Terje Rypdal chronology
After the Rain (1976)	Waves (1978)	Terje Rypdal / Miroslav Vitous / Jack DeJohnette (1979)

Waves is the seventh album by Norwegian jazz guitarist Terje Rypdal, recorded in September 1977 and released on ECM the following year. The quartet features trumpeter Palle Mikkelborg and rhythm section Sveinung Hovensjø and Jon Christensen.

== Reception ==
Professional ratings
Review scores
Source	Rating
AllMusic	4/5 stars

The AllMusic review by Michael P. Dawson awarded the album 4 stars stating "This contains some of Rypdal's jazziest music."

== Track listing ==
All tracks are written by Terje Rypdal, except as noted.

Side I
No.	Title	Writer(s)	Length
1.	"Per Ulv"		8:37
2.	"Karusell"		8:12
3.	"Stenskoven"	Palle Mikkelborg	3:49

Side II
No.	Title	Length
1.	"Waves"	5:42
2.	"The Dain Curse"	8:45
3.	"Charisma"	6:15

== Personnel ==
- Terje Rypdal – electric guitar, synthesizer, RMI keyboard computer
- Palle Mikkelborg – trumpet, tack piano, RMI keyboard computer, ring modulator
- Sveinung Hovensjø – 6 & 4 string electric bass
- Jon Christensen – drums, percussion
