= Lynni Treekrem =

American-Norwegian singer and composer (born 1958)

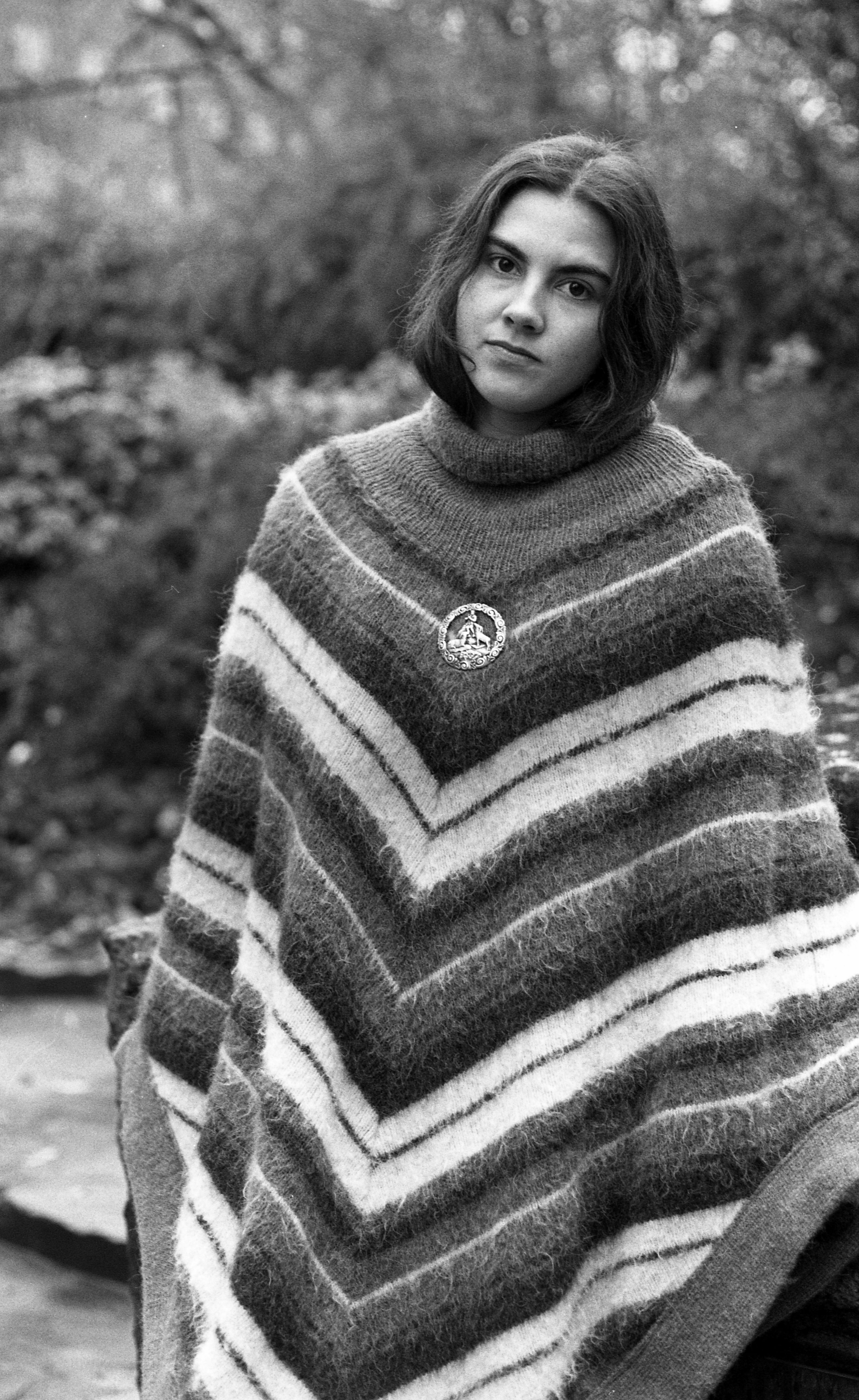
- Treekrem in 1976
- Born: Helen Lynn Treekrem; 26 December 1958 (age 67); Seattle, Washington, U.S.
- Citizenship: Norway; United States
- Occupations: Singer; composer
- Years active: 1970–present
- Awards: Spellemannprisen (1995)
- Musical career
- Origin: Kristiansund, Norway
- Genres: Pop-jazz; Folk; Country; Rock
- Instruments: Vocals; Piano
- Labels: Sony Music; Columbia Records; Kirkelig Kulturverksted; Universal Music; Tylden & Co

Helen Lynn "Lynni" Treekrem (born 26 December 1958) is an American-born Norwegian singer and composer.

She was born in the United States, but when she was four years old, her family moved to Norway and settled in Kristiansund.

She had a keen interest in singing and music, and the young girl constantly entertained family and friends. While attending secondary school, she joined the Kristiansund band Asterix. Some of her childhood friends were Frode Alnæs and Øivind "Elg" Elgenes, who later formed Dance with a Stranger. She also participated in several talent competitions.

Treekrem has since collaborated with Åge Aleksandersen, Frode Alnæs and Jonas Fjeld.

In the autumn of 1991, her debut album, Ut i vind, was released to critical acclaim. Her next solo album, Tusenfryd, was an even greater success. Here she collaborated with the mariachi orchestra Mariachi Los Camperos de Nati Cano. Treekrem also managed to bring the orchestra to Norway for a tour. Both the record company and the booking agency rolled their eyes when Treekrem said, "I'm going to get the Mexicans over here." Her drive and enthusiasm led to results. In fact, there were two tours. "Nothing is impossible" is her motto in life. For the album Haugtussa, she won the Spellemannprisen in 1995 in the category "Best Female Artist". She also won the Gammleng-prisen in the open category in 1995. Storm is a dark album that did not go down well with the public. Treekrem was going through depression and divorce at the time it was produced. In 2003, she released a compilation CD called I manesjen.

Treekrem became known to a younger audience when the TV programme Team Antonsen used her song "Mexico" in several of its sketches.

== Discography ==
=== Albums ===
- Ut i vind (1991)
- Tusenfryd (1994)
- Storm (1997)
- I manesjen 1990–2003 (2003)
- Sweethearts (with Geir Sundstøl) (2004)

Collaborative studio albums

- Haugtussa (with Ketil Bjørnstad) (1995)
- Falne engler (with Steinar Albrigtsen and Henning Kvitnes) (1999)
