= Geir Holmsen =

Norwegian jazz musician and composer

- Born: 12 December 1956 (age 69); Oslo, Norway
- Origin: Norway
- Genres: Jazz; rock
- Occupation: Musician
- Instrument: Bass guitar
- Website: www.uia.no/kk/profil/geirho

Geir Holmsen (born 12 December 1956) is a Norwegian jazz musician, bassist, arranger and composer, and married 1983 to the singer Maj Britt Andersen. He participated in various bands connected to the jazz club Club 7 in Oslo, from the mid-1970s, including "Kråbøl", "Lotus" and "Chipahua". He is also known from "Jon Eberson Group" (1980–84), "Jazzpønkensemblet" (1982–85) and "Oslo Rhythm & Blues Ensemble" (1986–87).

== Career ==
Holmsen is educated at the Norges Musikkhøgskole, and did composition studies with Gunnar Sønstevold and Maj Sønstevold, now Professor of Music at the University of Agder (UiA).

In the 1970s he took part in jazz bands led by Terje Lie, Paul Weeden, Espen Rud and Ditlef Eckhoff. In the 1980s, Holmsen was within Chipahua, Jon Eberson Group and Jazzpunkensemblet. He is the composer of several of Maj Britt Andersen album releases, and productions of Folk er rare at Det Norske Teatret and Riksteatret. Holmsen has also been a board member of TONO.

== Honors ==
- Spellemannprisen 1981, as member of Jon Ebserson Group
- Gammleng-prisen 1996 in the studio class
- TONO's Kardemommestipend 1990
- Juliusprisen 1994
- Teskjekjerringprisen 2001, with Maj Britt Andersen and Trond Brænne

== Discography ==
Albums (in selection)

- 1981: Jive Talking (CBS Records), with Jon Eberson Group
- 1984: One of These Mornings / My Funny Valentine (Philips Records), with Silje Nergaard
- 1986: Dansere I Natten (Kirkelig Kulturverksted), with Bjørn Eidsvåg
- 1986: Perfect Crime (Bahama Records), with Vindél
- 1986: Folk Er Rare! (Barneselskapet), with Maj Britt Andersen
- 1988: Vertigo (Kirkelig Kulturverksted), with Bjørn Eidsvåg
- 1991: Live at Rockefeller (Odin Records), with Jon Eberson's Jazzpunkensemblet
- 1992: Kjærtegn (Norsk Plateproduksjon), with Maj Britt Andersen
- 1994: Rippel Rappel (Grappa Music), with Maj Britt Andersen
- 1997: På Svai (Norsk Plateproduksjon), with Bjørn Eidsvåg
- 1998: Meridians (Bahama Records), with Torbjørn Sunde
- 2003: Kong Lavring (Pan Records), with Kong Lavring
- 2005: Rock Vs. Opera (Grappa Music), with Dollie de Luxe
- 2006: Receita Para A Vida (Ipe Mundi Records), with Latini
