= Terje Rypdal (album) =

Studio album by Terje Rypdal
- Released: 1971
- Recorded: August 12–13, 1971
- Studio: Arne Bendiksen Studio; Oslo, Norway
- Genre: Jazz fusion; post-bop; avant-garde jazz
- Length: 42:47
- Label: ECM 1016 ST
- Producer: Manfred Eicher

Terje Rypdal chronology
Bleak House (1968)	Terje Rypdal (1971)	What Comes After (1973)

Terje Rypdal is an album by Norwegian jazz guitarist Terje Rypdal recorded over two days in August 1971 and released on ECM later that year. The septet features singer Inger Lise Rypdal, saxophonist Jan Garbarek, oboist Ekkehard Fintl, and rhythm section Bobo Stenson, Arild Andersen and Jon Christensen.

== Reception ==
Professional ratings
Review scores
Source	Rating
AllMusic	3/5 stars

The AllMusic review gave the album three stars.

== Track listing ==
All tracks are written by Terje Rypdal

Side I
No.	Title	Length
1.	"Keep It Like That - Tight"	12:14
2.	"Rainbow"	7:05
Total length:		19:19

Side II
No.	Title	Length
1.	"Electric Fantasy"	15:33
2.	"Lontano II"	3:11
3.	"Tough Enough"	4:44
Total length:		23:28 42:47

== Personnel ==
- Terje Rypdal – guitar, flute
- Jan Garbarek – tenor saxophone, flute, clarinet
- Ekkehard Fintl – oboe, English horn
- Bobo Stenson – electric piano
- Arild Andersen – double bass, bass guitar
- Jon Christensen – percussion
- Inger Lise Rypdal – vocals
