= Maj Britt Andersen =

Norwegian singer

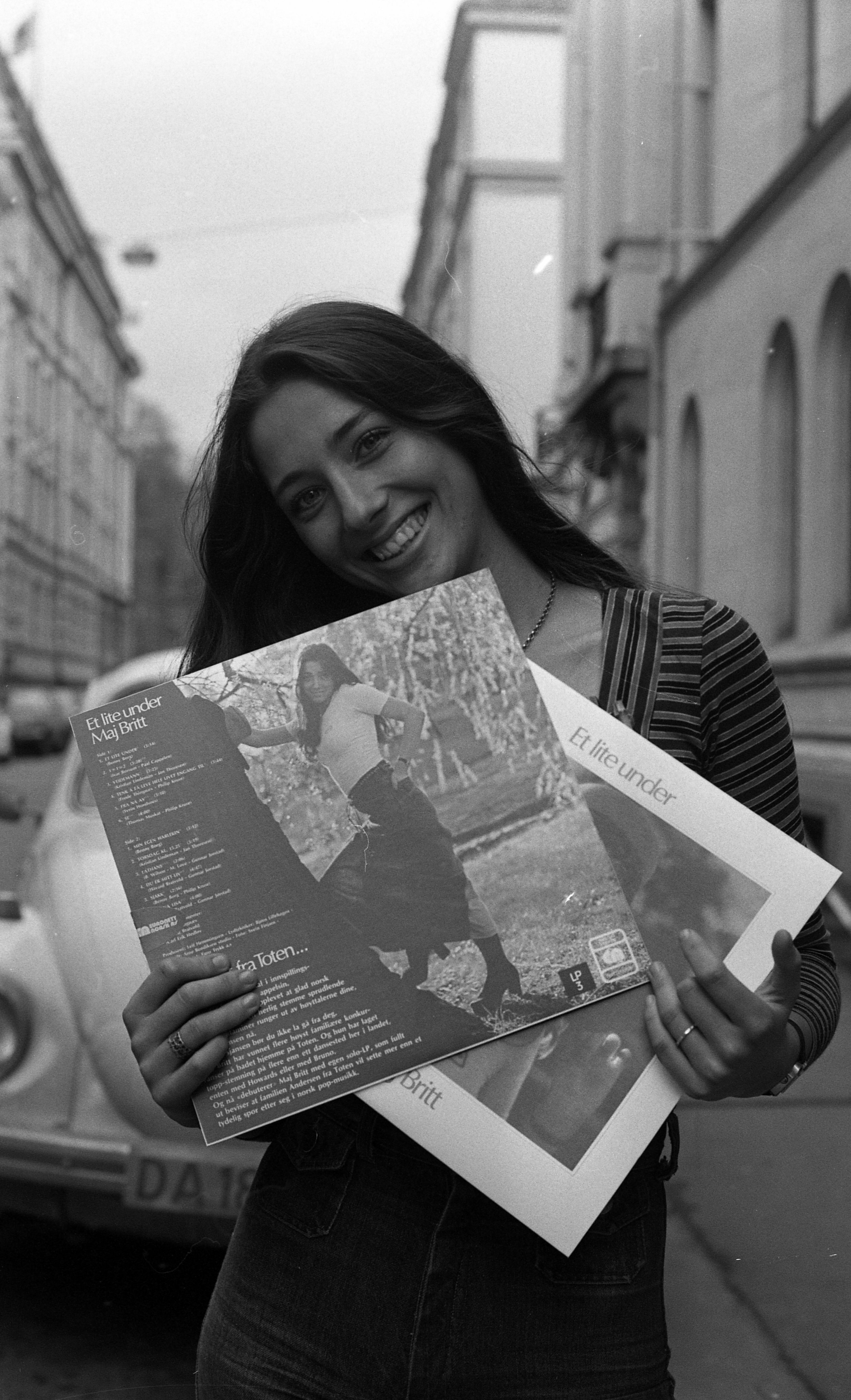

Background information
- Born: 15 November 1956 (age 69); Lena, Norway
- Genres: Pop
- Occupation: Singer

Maj Britt Andersen (born 15 November 1956) is a Norwegian singer.

== Biography ==
She was born in Østre Toten Municipality and is a sister of Inger Lise Rypdal. Her album Folk er rare from 1986 earned her Spellemannprisen. She was singing in the soul group Chipahua in the 1980s. She has also issued albums with texts by Alf Prøysen (Kjærtegn from 1992 and Dørstokken heme from 2004).

Andersen has also been a member of the municipal council of Asker Municipality for one term, representing a local party.

Since 1983 she has been married to the bassist and music producer Geir Holmsen.

== Honors ==
- 2015: Spellemannprisen in the Children's Music category, for the album Væla Omkring

== Discography ==
=== Solo albums ===
- 1975: Et Lite Under (Nett Records)
- 1978: Det Svinger I Meg (CBS Records)
- 1986: Folk Er Rare! (Barneselskapet)
- 1987: Tida Går Så Altfor Fort (Barneselskapet)
- 1987: Folk Er Rare! 2! (Slager Records)
- 1990: Tamme Erter Og Villbringebær (Norsk Plateproduksjon AS)
- 1992: Kjærtegn (Norsk Plateproduksjon AS)
- 1994: Rippel Rappel (Grappa Music)
- 1997: Vinterkropp (Grappa Music)
- 1998: Chevina (Grappa Music)
- 2006: Onger Er Rare (MajorStudio AS)
- 2010: Indranis Sang (Barnemusikken)
- 2015: Væla Omkring (Grappa Music)
- 2017: Pulverheksas og vennene hennes
- 2018: Et stille sted
