= Stein Ingebrigtsen =

Norwegian singer (born 1945)

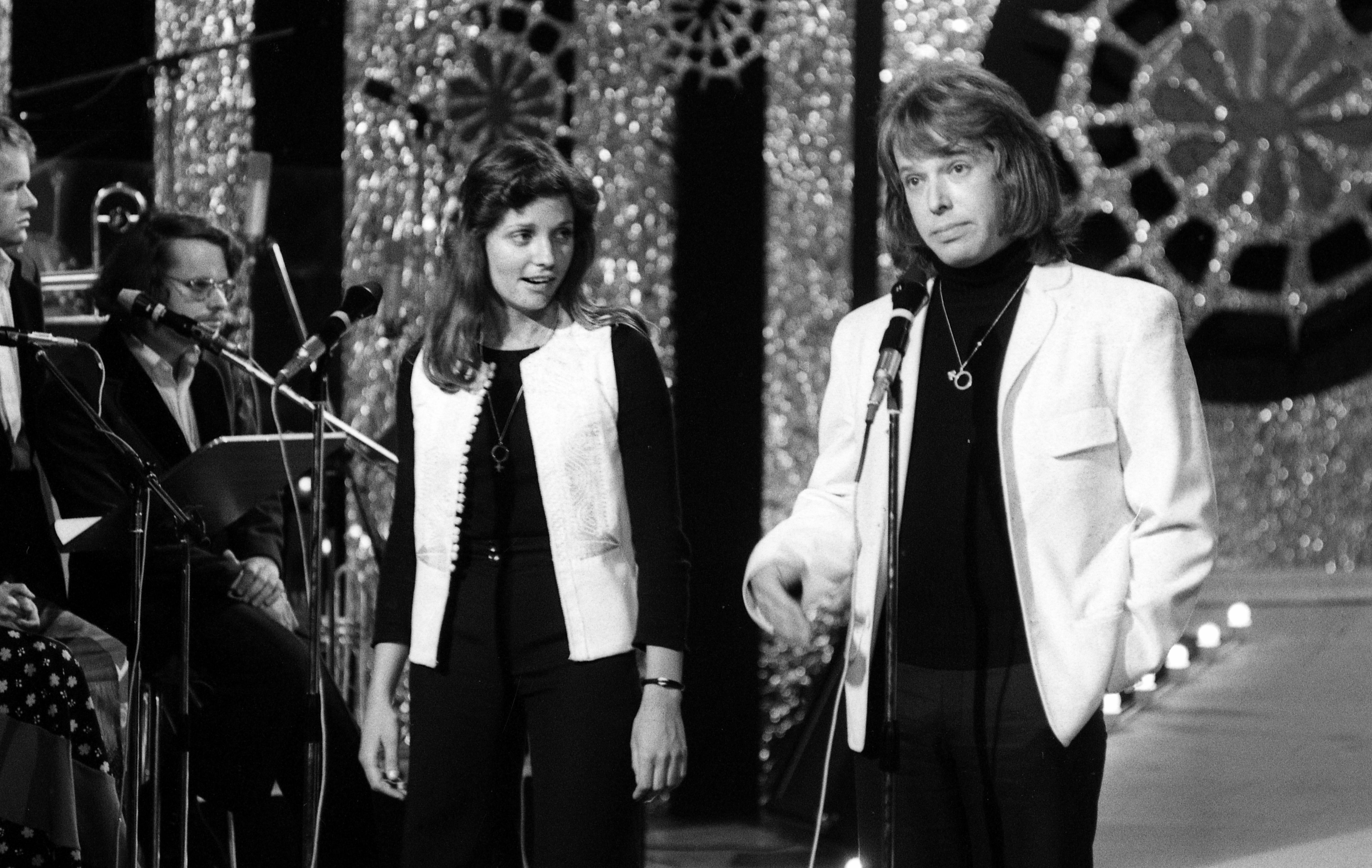
Ingebrigtsen and Inger Lise Rypdal in 1974.

Stein Ingebrigtsen (born 23 August 1945) is a Norwegian singer. He was enormously popular in Norway in the 1970s, nicknamed "Mr. Norsktoppen" for his countless hits topping Norsktoppen, an official chart for music in Norwegian.

== Biography ==
From the 1960s and through the 1970s, he sold more than one million albums, most of his songs being Norwegian translations of classics and famous pop songs of that period. Ingebrigtsen was heavily involved in the Treff-series ("Treff" being a direct Norwegian translation of "hit") which by 1978 finally comprised 21 discs consisting of translations of popular foreign songs. Among his hits were Norwegian versions of "Only You (and You Alone)" ("Bare du") and "It Never Rains in Southern California" ("Solen skinner alltid der du aller helst vil være"). After this, Ingebrigtsen stepped down his own musical activity and only sporadic releases such as Stjernetegn and Soldatenes kortstokk in 1988 and 1989. He continued working as a producer for other musicians. Ingebrigtsen released Edelstein – de 20 beste in 2001.

He is the father of pop-singer Christian Ingebrigtsen, who is a member of the England-based boy band A1.

== Discography ==
=== Studio albums ===
- note - this may be an incomplete list of studio album

List of studio albums, with selected chart positions
Title	Album details	Peak chart positions
Title	Album details	NOR
Sjung Bort Bekymren (with Inger Lise Rypdal)	Released: 1972; Label: RCA Victor (LSA 3148)	—
Hello-A (with Inger Lise Rypdal)	Released: 1972; Label: RCA Victor (LPNES 307)	—
Bare Stein	Released: 1973; Label: RCA Victor (TLS4001)	10
Tilbake til naturen	Released: 1974; Label: RCA Victor (TLS 4005)	15
Stein	Released: 1975; Label: Talent / RCA (TLS 4012)	—
Soloppgang	Released: 1977; Label: Talent / RCA(TLS 3023)	—
Stein Ingebrigtsen Band (as Stein Ingebrigtsen Band)	Released: 1983; Label: CBS 84957	—
Før og nå	Released: 2016; Label: Talent	—

=== Charted compilations albums ===
List of charted albums, with selected chart positions
Title	Album details	Peak chart positions
Title	Album details	NOR
Det magisketegnet og andre koselåter (with Friends)	Released: 1972; Label: RCA (INTS 1401)	17

=== Top 10 charted singles ===
List of top 10 singles, with selected chart positions
Title	Year	Chart positions
Title	Year	NOR
"Cento campane"	1972	1
"Solen skinner alltid der du helst vil være"	1973	4
"Bare du"	1973	1
"Den sangen han sang engang"	1974	10
"Storholt, Stensen, Stenshjemmet og Sjøbrend åsså'n Hjallis" (with Store Stå)	1977	3
