= What Comes After (album) =

Studio album by Terje Rypdal
- Released: 1974
- Recorded: August 7–8, 1973
- Studio: Arne Bendiksen Studio; Oslo, Norway
- Genre: Jazz
- Length: 39:40
- Label: ECM 1031
- Producer: Manfred Eicher

Terje Rypdal chronology
| Terje Rypdal (1971) | What Comes After (1974) | Whenever I Seem to Be Far Away (1974) |

What Comes After is the third album by Norwegian jazz guitarist Terje Rypdal, recorded over two days in August 1973 and released on ECM the following year.

Professional ratings
Review scores
| Source | Rating |
|---|---|
| Allmusic | 3/5 stars |
| The Rolling Stone Jazz Record Guide | 2/5 stars |

== Track listing ==
All compositions by Terje Rypdal except as indicated

1. "Bend It" - 9:55
2. "Yearning" - 3:22
3. "Icing" (Jon Christensen, Terje Rypdal) - 7:50
4. "What Comes After" - 10:58
5. "Sejours" (Barre Phillips) - 3:51
6. "Back of J." (Phillips) - 4:17

== Personnel ==
- Terje Rypdal – guitar, flute
- Erik Niord Larsen – oboe, English horn
- Barre Phillips – bass, piccolo bass
- Sveinung Hovensjø – electric bass
- Jon Christensen – percussion, organ
