= Sveinung Hovensjø =

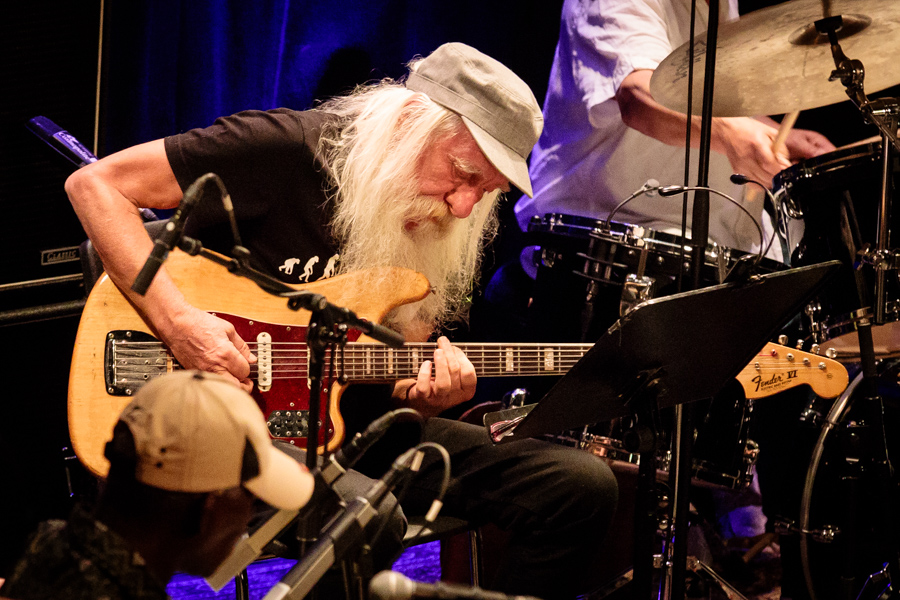
- Hovensjø at Cosmopolite in 2017

Background information
- Born: 5 December 1950 (age 75); Lillehammer, Oppland
- Origin: Norway
- Genres: Jazz
- Occupations: Musician and composer
- Instruments: Bass guitar, ukulele and guitar
- Labels: ECM; Kirkelig Kulturverksted

Sveinung Hovensjø (born 5 December 1950) is a Norwegian jazz musician (bass and guitar), known as one of the most used studio musicians in Norway, and also for his collaboration with guitarist Terje Rypdal (1974–78).

== Career ==
Hovensjø was born in Lillehammer but grew up at Toten. He started at a young age in "Prototypes" in Gjøvik, played with the dance band "Bruno" during the 1960s, participated at the 1969 Kongsberg Jazz Festival with the Geir Wentzel soul bandsoul band, and made his record debut with Earl Wilson in 1970. There after he moved to Oslo where he joined the music scene around Club 7, and played within Christian Reim Trio (1977–79). He also played with Jazz greats like Terje Rypdal, Jan Garbarek, Susanne Fuhr among others. Later he played within the Trio de Janeiro, The Gambian/Norwegian Friendship Orchestra, Son Mu, Tamma, Moose Loose og Talisman Group, and with Claudio Latini, Celio de Carvalho and Miki N'Doye.

== Honors ==
- Gammleng-prisen 1983 (studio)
- The first Smugetprisen 1990

== Discography ==
With Terje Rypdal

- 1973: What Comes After (ECM 1031)
- 1974: Whenever I Seem to Be Far Away (ECM 1045)
- 1975: Odyssey (ECM 1067/8)
- 1977: Waves (ECM 1110)

With Bjørn Eidsvåg

- 1981: Live in New York (Kirkelig Kulturverksted)
- 1983: Passe gal (Kirkelig Kulturverksted)
- 1984: På leit (Kirkelig Kulturverksted)

With Jukka Syrenius Band

- 1986* The Cat With A Hat Album

With "Talisman"

- 1991: Dating
- 1994: Vardøger

With "Trio de Janeiro"

- 1993: Brazilikum
- 1994: Amoregano

With other projects

- 1974: Elgen Er Løs (Mai), with "Moose Loose"
- 1977: E'Olen (Mai), with "E'Olen"
- 1977: Blow Out (Compendium Records), with "Blow Out"
- 1981: Domino, with "Susanne Fuhr Quintet"
- 2007: Kingdom of Norway (Bonnier Amigo), with Ronni Le Tekrø
