= Dance with a Stranger (band) =

Norwegian rock band

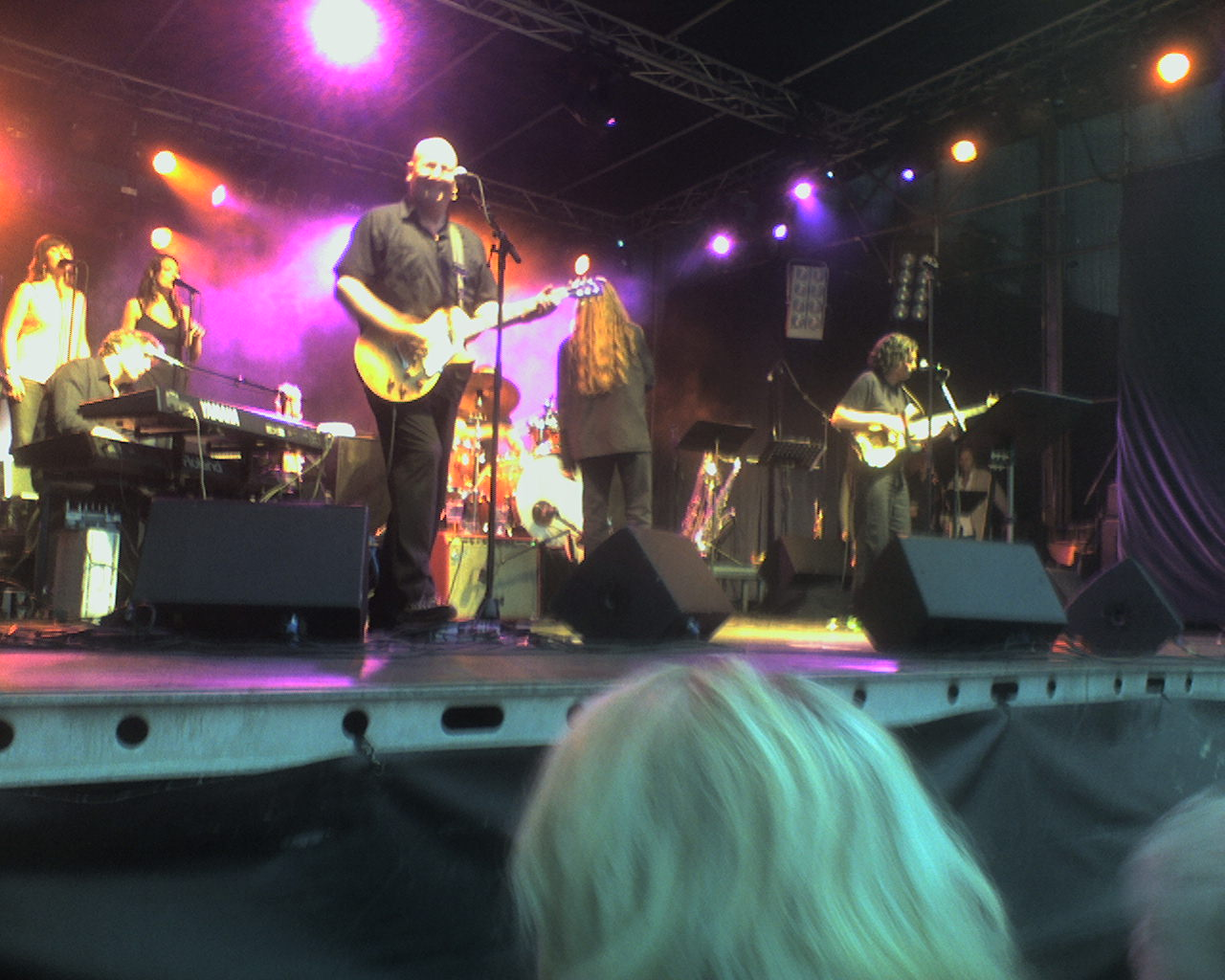
- Dance with a Stranger on a reunion concert in Kristiansund in 2005 (Frode sings, Elg is in the back).

Background information
- Origin: Kristiansund, Norway
- Genres: Pop music
- Years active: 1984–present
- Labels: Norsk Plateproduksjon
- Members: Frode Alnæs; Øivind Elgenes; Per Mathisen; Bjørn Jenssen
- Past members: Yngve Moe
- Website: www.frodealnaes.no

Dance with a Stranger is a Norwegian rock band from Kristiansund.

== Biography ==
The band was founded in Bergen 1984 and had great success until they parted in 1994. Since then, they have had a few reunion concerts, as well as releasing compilation CDs.

In 1990, they performed at the World Music Awards in Monte Carlo and won an award for World's Best-Selling Norwegian Artist. They were, among other things, voted Spellemann of the Year at the Spellemannprisen 1991. The band took a longer break in the period 2002 to 2005. In 2007, they released the double compilation album Everyone Needs a Friend... The Very Best of Dance with a Stranger with three new songs and previously unreleased soundtracks from the 1980s, as well as highlights from the band's many releases.

In 2013, bassist Yngve Moe died in an accident. The band still completed their farewell tour in 2014, now joined by Per Mathisen on bass. The band has continued concert activities after this.

== Discography ==
- Dance with a Stranger (1987)
- To (1989)
- Atmosphere (1991)
- Look What You've Done (1994)
- Unplugged (1994)
- The Best of Dance with a Stranger (1995)
- Happy Sounds (1998)
- Everyone Needs a Friend... The Very Best Of ( 2007)

== Members ==
Present members

- Frode Alnæs – guitar, vocals
- Øivind "Elg" Elgenes – vocals
- Per Mathisen – bass (2014)
- Bjørn Jenssen – drums

Former member

- Yngve Moe – bass (1983–1994; died 2013)

== Sources ==
- Pop-lexicon (Norwegian)
- About Dance with a Stranger at the music guide Groove.no (Norwegian)
- Website

Awards
Preceded by Tomboy	Recipient of the Pop Spellemannprisen; 1988/1989	Succeeded by Sigvart Dagsland
