= Brynjulf Blix =

Norwegian pianist

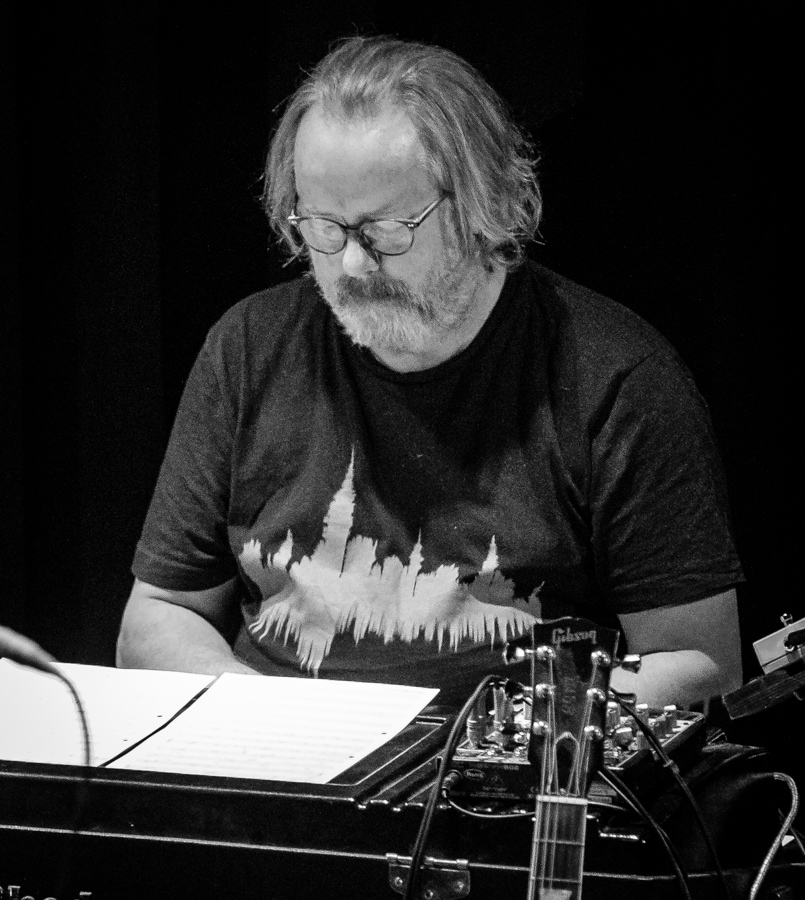

Background information
- Born: December 20, 1951 (age 74); Oslo, Norway
- Genres: Jazz, blues
- Occupations: Musician, composer
- Instrument: Piano
- Years active: 1975–present

Brynjulf Blix (born December 20, 1951) is a Norwegian pianist. Known from his collaboration with Terje Rypdal, Blix received broader notoriety as a member of the group Alex, supporting the singer Alex Naumik. Blix is also known for his knowledge of electronic music and computer science. He has worked as a computer journalist for DinSide. He has withdrawn from performing, concentrating on his writing, though he has appeared in Norway with the band PATEYs PIPE.

== Discography ==
- Terje Rypdal: Odyssey – ECM Records, 1975
- George K Band: Let's Move Together – Private Stock Records, 1977
- Anita Skorgan (LPs, albums) – Snowflake Skandinavisk Artist Produksjon, 1978
- Lion & The Lamb: Lion & The Lamb (LP, album) – Polydor, 1978
- Alex: Alex' Beste – Polydor, 1981
- Terje Wiik: Wiikend A Go Go (LP, album) – Limbo Musikkproduksjon, 1984
- BANG 85: The Further You Go (LP, album) – Spider Records, 1985
- Guttorm Guttormsen Quartet: Soturnudi & Albufeira – Plastic Strip, 2008
