= Bjørn Jenssen =

Norwegian jazz drummer

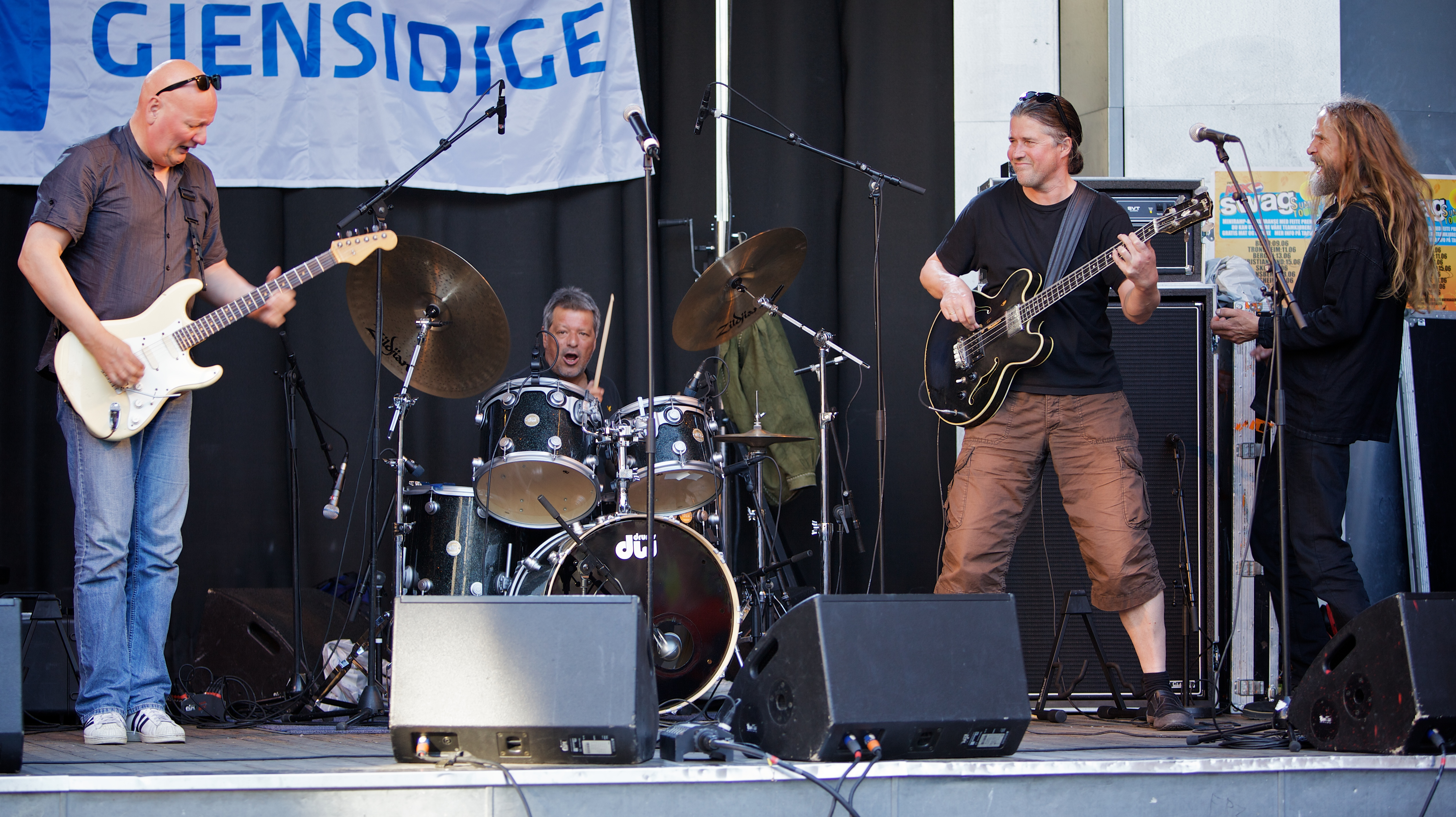
- Jenssen with Dance with a Stranger in 2009.

Background information
- Born: 1959 (age 66–67); Bodø, Norway
- Origin: Norwegian
- Genre: Jazz
- Occupation: Musician
- Instrument: Drums

Bjørn Jenssen (born 1959 in Bodø, Norway) is a Norwegian jazz musician (drums), known from a number of recordings, and steady drummer in the band Dance With a Stranger.

== Career ==
Jenssen started playing drums 1974 in local Bodø bands like "Dynamite Rockers" and "Kjell Bartholsen Band". He relocated to Oslo in 1976, and was engaged in bands like "Saluki", "Paul Weeden Band", Bill Mulholland Quintet, "Susanne Fuhr Band" (1977–79), "Ruphus" (1979), "Chipahua" (1979–81), Jon Eberson Group (1980–87), Jazzpunkensemblet, Dance With a Stranger (two times awarded Spellemannprisen). In addition Jenssen has collaborated with musicians like Bjørn Eidsvåg, Trygve Henrik Hoff, Vazelina Bilopphøggers, Kari Bremnes and Reidar Larsen.

== Discography ==
Within Saluki

- 1977: Saluki (Compendium Records)

With Anita Skorgan

- 1978: Anita Skorgan (Snowflake)

Within Ruphus

- 1979: Manmade (Brain)

With Arild Nyquist and Terje Wiik

- 1980: Epleslang (Octave)

With Trygve Henrik Hoff

- 1980: Fokti... (RCA Victor)

Within Jon Eberson Group

- 1981: Jive Talking (CBS Records)
- 1984: City Visions (CBS Records)
- 1985: Stories (CBS Records)

With Mikkel Magnus

- 1981: Mikkel Magnus Ser Rødt (Mariann)

With Prima Vera

- 1983: Her Kommer Olavs Menn (Sonet Records)

With Beate

- 1984: Like A River (EMI Music)

With Silhouette

- 1984: Silhouette (RCA Victor)

Within Chipahua

- 1984: The Soul Survivors (Hit Records!)

With Bjørn Eidsvåg

- 1986: Dansere I Natten (Kirkelig Kulturverksted)
- 1988: Vertigo (Kirkelig Kulturverksted)

Within Dance With a Stranger

- 1987: Dance with a Stranger (Norsk Plateproduksjon)
- 1989: To (Norsk Plateproduksjon)
- 1991: Atmosphere (Norsk Plateproduksjon)
- 1994: Look What You've Done (Norsk Plateproduksjon)
- 1994: Unplugged (Norsk Plateproduksjon)
- 1995: The Best of Dance with a Stranger (Mercury Records)
- 1998: Happy Sounds (Mercury Records)
- 2007: Everyone Needs a Friend... The Very Best Of (Mercury Records)

With Vazelina Bilopphøggers

- 1989: Tempo (Opal Rekords)

Within Jazz-Punk Ensemblet

- 1993: Live at Rockefeller (Odin Records)

With Kari Bremnes

- 1994: Gåte Ved Gåte (Kirkelig Kulturverksted)
- 1997: Månestein (Kirkelig Kulturverksted)
- 2000: Norwegian Mood (Kirkelig Kulturverksted)

With Terje Nilsen

- 1996: Sånn (Nord-Norsk Plateselskap)

With Hedge Hog

- 1997: BRSTL.com (Voices of Wonder Records)
