= Torbjørn Sunde =

Norwegian jazz trombonist (born 1954)

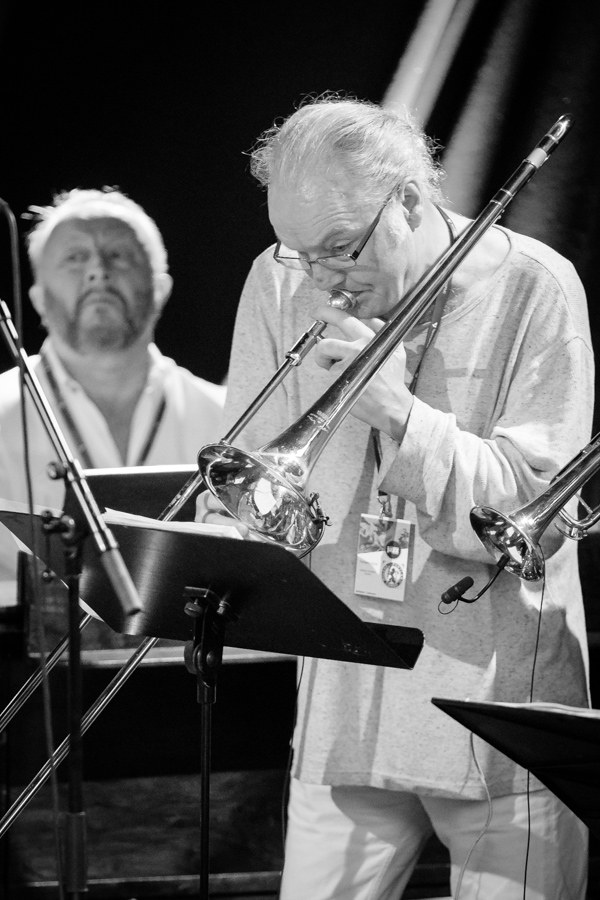
- Sunde in 2018

Background information
- Born: 16 February 1954 (age 72); Oslo, Norway
- Genres: Jazz
- Occupation: Musician
- Instrument: Trombone

Torbjørn Sunde (born 16 February 1954) is a Norwegian jazz trombonist who has worked with Terje Rypdal, Edward Vesala, Jon Balke, Knut Værnes, Rickie Lee Jones, Randy Crawford, Dr. John, Jan Eggum, Jan Garbarek, and Mezzoforte.

== Musical career ==
After growing up at Gjøvik he got a bachelor in football from Norges Idrettshøgskole, and a master in musicology at University of Oslo. He participated on a number of recordings with Terje Rypdal (Odyssey, 1975), Edward Vesala (1977), Oslo 13 (awarded Spellemannprisen in 1988, for the album Off Balance), Oslo Rhythm & Blues Ensemble, Four Roosters, Etno Funk, Chipahua, Horns for Hire, Jazzpunkensemblet, and Mezzoforte.

He has participated on releases by Jon Eberson (Stash, 1988), Jon Balke (Nonsentration, 1990) and Knut Værnes (1993). He worked with Rickie Lee Jones, Randy Crawford, Dr. John, Jan Eggum (Deilig, 1999) and Jan Garbarek.

He led his own orchestra "Meridians of Music" (with such musical profiles as Terje Rypdal, Bugge Wesseltoft, Eivind Aarset and Jon Balke), and the "Torbjørn Sunde Octet" (with Jon Eberson, Rob Waring, Morten Halle, Håvard Lund, Trude Eick, Aslak Hartberg and Jens Petter Antonsen) with album releases. He also had his own Quartet with Tom Olstad, Roy Powell and Per Mathisen (The Blue Note sessions).

== Speedskater ==
In his youth, Sunde was a very promising speedskater representing "Gjøvik Skøiteklub". In 1971, at the age of 17, he skated 500 meters in 41.5 seconds. Sunde participated in three sprint NM (Norgesmesterskapet) in 1971, 1972 and 1973, with a 9th place as the best in 1973.

He is the younger brother of speedskater Arnulf Sunde (1976 Winter Olympics participant).

== Awards and honors ==
- Spellemannprisen 1988 in the class Jazz, with Oslo 13 for the album Off Balance

== Discography ==
- Meridians (ACT, 1998)
- Where Is the Chet (K&K, 2001)
