= Ulf Wakenius =

Swedish jazz guitarist

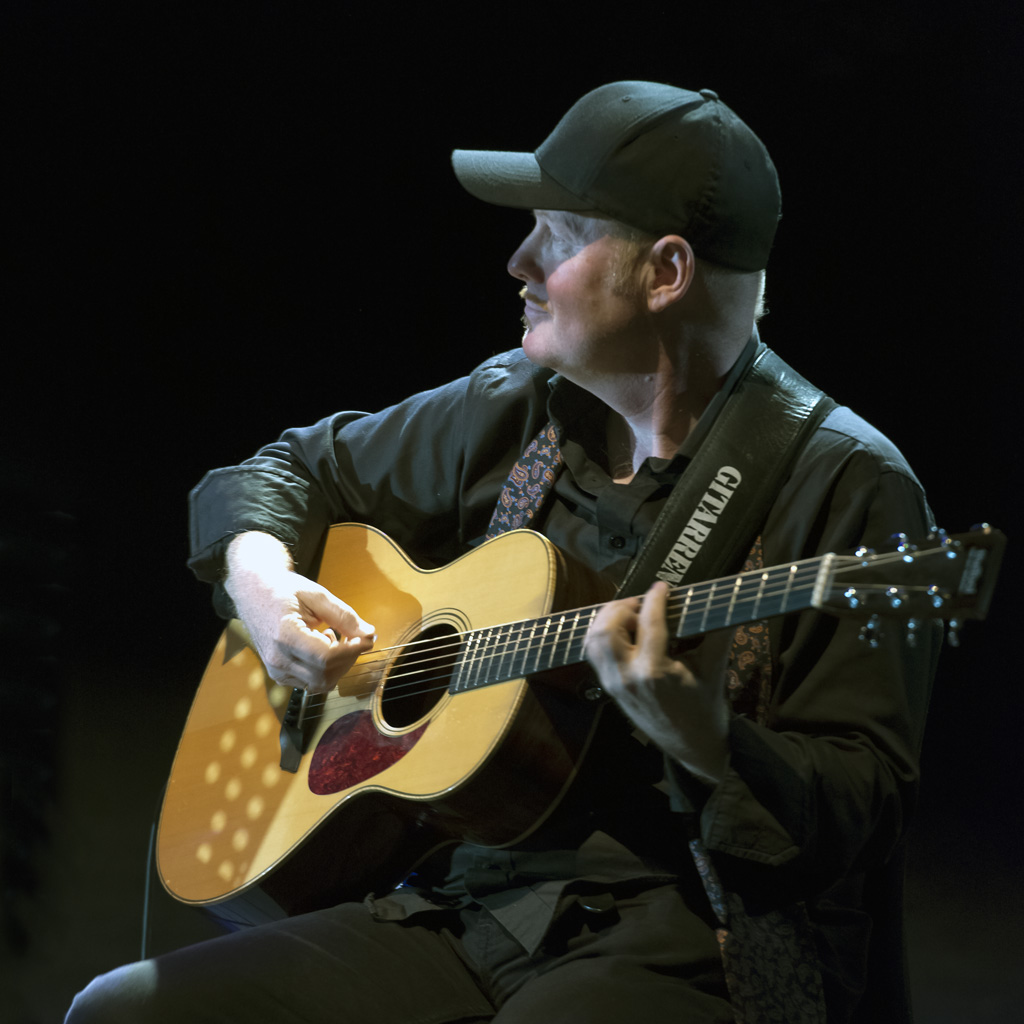
- Wakenius in Nice, France, 2014

Background information
- Born: Ulf Karl Erik Wakenius; 16 April 1958 (age 68); Halmstad, Sweden
- Genres: Jazz
- Occupation: Musician
- Instrument: Guitar
- Label: ACT
- Website: ulfwakenius.net

Ulf Karl Erik Wakenius (born 16 April 1958) is a Swedish jazz guitarist, known as a member of Oscar Peterson's last quartet from 1997. He was also a member of the Ray Brown trio.

== Career ==
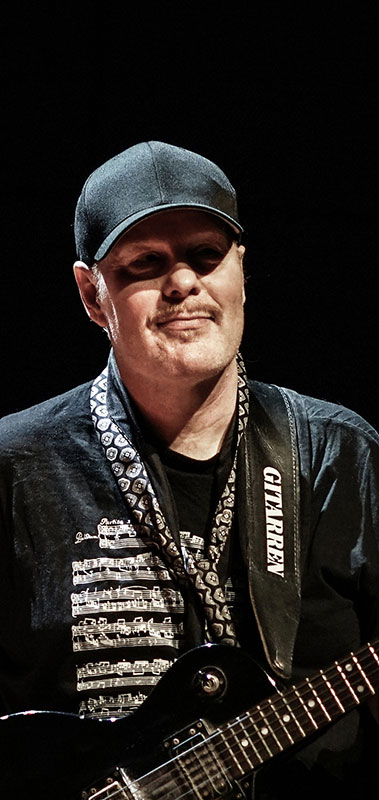
Wakenius in Aarhus Denmark 2018

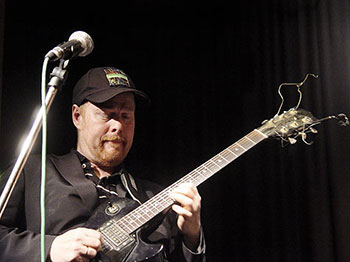
Wakenius in 2014

Wakenius was born in Halmstad and raised in Gothenburg. In the 1980s, he played with Peter Almqvist in Guitars Unlimited, playing during the intermission for 600 million viewers of the Swedish International Finale of the Eurovision Song Contest in 1985. A stop in Rio de Janeiro resulted in three records with Sivuca: Aquarela Do Brazil (1985), Rendez-Vous in Rio (1986), and Let's Vamos (1987). He recorded Those Who Were (1996) and This Is All I Ask (1998) with Niels-Henning Ørsted Pedersen. Enchanted Moments (1996) was recorded with Lars Jansson, Lars Danielsson, and Raymond Karlsson. On Dig In (1997) he plays with Gösta Rundqvist, Yasuhito Mori, and Jukkis Uotila.

Live (2000) and The Guitar Artistry of U.W. (2002) were followed by Forever You (Stunt, 2003) and Tokyo Blue (2004) with Carsten Dahl on piano, Morten Lund on drums, and Lars Danielsson on bass.

His albums for ACT Music include Notes from the Heart (2005), a tribute to Keith Jarrett with Lund and Johansson; Love Is Real (2008), Signature Edition 2 (2010), Vagabond (2012), and Momento Magico (2014).

In the early 1990s, Wakenius started the group Graffiti with Dennis Chambers and Gary Grainger from the John Scofield group. They released the album Good Groove in 1994. He appeared on Duke Ellington Swings (Telarc, 1998). With Oscar Peterson he released Summernight in Munich (Telarc, 1999) and Trail of Dreams. With Ray Brown he played on Summertime (1998) and Seven Steps to Heaven (1995), as well as Some of My Best Friends Are Guitar Players (2001). With Pat Metheny he played Jazz Baltica 2003.

In Norway he has played on the album Hot Cats (2005), with Hot Club de Norvège and the Camelia String Quartet and participated on Guitaresque for Hot Club Records with Jon Larsen and Jimmy Rosenberg. Other contributions have been on Lisa Nilssons Små Rum (2001), Cæcilie Norbys First Conversations (2002), as well as recordings by Viktoria Tolstoy, Esbjörn Svensson, and Youn Sun Nah. In 2006, he toured with his show In the Spirit of Oscar with Kjell Öhman on piano, Hans Backenroth on bass, and Joakim Ekberg on drums.

== Discography ==
=== As leader ===
- Urban Experience (Dragon, 1984)
- Back to the Roots (Sonet 1992)
- Venture (L+R, 1992)
- New York Meeting (L+R, 1994)
- Dig in (Sittel, 1997)
- The Guitar Artistry Of (Dragon, 2002)
- Forever You (Stunt, 2003)
- Notes from the Heart (ACT, 2005)
- Filthy McNasty with Groove Factor (Stunt, 2007)
- Love Is Real (ACT, 2008)
- Vagabond (ACT, 2012)
- Momento Magico (ACT, 2014)
- Logos (ACT, 2016)
- Father and Son (ACT, 2017)
- Good Stuff (ACT 2017)
- Taste of Honey (ACT, 2020)

With Guitars Unlimited

- Introducing Guitars Unlimited (Ton Art 1983)
- Phraserace (Coop, 1983)
- Acoustic Shokk (Sonet, 1986)
- Let's Vamos (Son 1987)
- Three for the Road (Sonet, 1989)

With Hawk on Flight

- In Time for Hawk On Flight (Nordisc, 1979)
- Hawk On Flight (Amar, 1980)
- Blue Eyed (Four Leaf Clover 1984)

=== As sideman ===
With Ray Brown

- Seven Steps to Heaven (Telarc, 1995)
- Summertime (Telarc, 1998)
- Some of My Best Friends Are...Guitarists (Telarc, 2002)

With Caecilie Norby

- First Conversation (Blue Note 2002)
- London/Paris (Copenhagen, 2004)
- Slow Fruit (Copenhagen, 2005)
- Arabesque (ACT, 2010)

With Niels-Henning Ørsted Pedersen

- Those Who Were (Verve, 1996)
- This Is All I Ask (Verve, 1998)
- The Unforgettable NHOP Trio Live (ACT, 2007)

With Oscar Peterson

- A Summer Night in Munich (Telarc, 1999)
- Trail of Dreams (Telarc, 2000)
- A Night in Vienna (Verve, 2004)

With Youn Sun Nah

- Voyage (Triangle Music, 2008)
- Same Girl (ACT, 2010)
- Lento (ACT, 2013)

With others

- Svend Asmussen, String Swing (Sonet, 1983)
- Svend Asmussen, Fiddler Supreme (Intim Musik, 1989)
- Jesper Bodilsen, Short Stories for Dreamers (Stunt, 2010)
- Bohuslän Big Band, The Blue Pearl (Phono Suecia 1996)
- Dennis Chambers & Haakon Graf & Gary Grainger, Good Groove (Lipstick, 1993)
- Lars Danielsson, Fresh Enough (L+R, 1992)
- Doky Brothers, Doky Brothers (Blue Note, 1995)
- Chris Minh Doky, The Sequel (Storyville, 1990)
- Niels Lan Doky, Friendship (Milestone, 1991)
- Inger Marie Gundersen, By Myself (Kultur & Spetakkel 2006)
- Inger Marie Gundersen, For You (Hitman Jazz, 2011)
- Wolfgang Haffner, Kind of Tango (ACT, 2020)
- Scott Hamilton, Live at Nefertiti (Stunt, 2009)
- Jonas Hellborg, Adfa Day (Eight Music 1989)
- Hot Club de Norvège & Vertavo, Vertavo (Hot Club, 1995)
- Hot Club de Norvège, Swinging with Vertavo, Angelo & Jimmy (Hot Club, 2001)
- Nils Landgren, Christmas With My Friends (ACT, 2007)
- Jon Larsen, Pascal De Loutchek, Stian Mevik, Guitaresque (Hot Club, 1994)
- Per Mathisen, Sounds of 3 Edition 2 (Losen, 2019)
- Lisa Nilsson, Sma Rum (Diesel Music, 2001)
- Gerardo Nunez, Jazzpana Live (ACT, 2015)
- Gerardo Nunez, Logos (ACT, 2016)
- Panzerballett, Starke Stucke (ACT, 2008)
- Povel Ramel, Aterbesok I Holken (Knappupp, 1991)
- Iiro Rantala, Jazz at Berlin Philharmonic V Lost Hero Tears for Esbjorn (ACT, 2016)
- Iiro Rantala, Good Stuff (ACT, 2017)
- Magnus Rosen, Set Me Free (Lazy Babes, 2007)
- Ida Sand, Meet Me Around Midnight (ACT, 2007)
- The Spotnicks, Unlimited (Mil 1989)
- Viktoria Tolstoy, My Swedish Heart (ACT, 2005)
- Hans Ulrik & Steve Swallow, Believe in Spring (Stunt, 2007)
- Bugge Wesseltoft, It's Snowing On My Piano (ACT, 2009)
- Putte Wickman, Django D'or (Gazell, 1999)
