= Haakon Graf =

Norwegian jazz musician

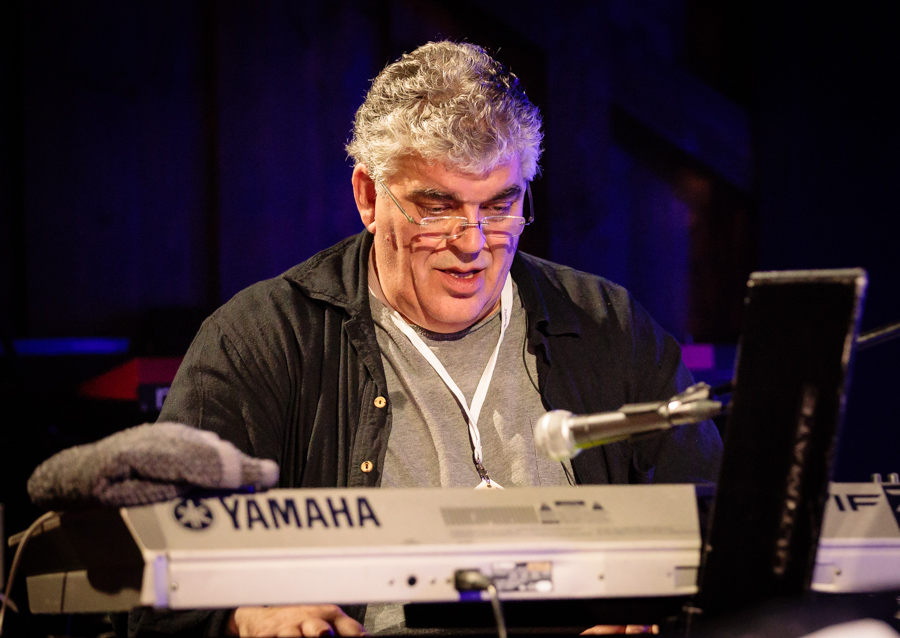
- Haakon Graf performing in 2017

Background information
- Born: Håkon Graf; 21 March 1955 (age 71); Oslo, Norway
- Genres: Jazz
- Occupation: Musician
- Instruments: Piano, keyboards, guitar, bass guitar, drums, percussion
- Label: Polydor
- Website: haakongraf.bandcamp.com

Haakon Graf (born 21 March 1955) is a Norwegian jazz musician, composer, arranger and producer.

== Biography ==
Graf was born in Oslo, Norway. He is the older brother of the bass guitarist of LAVA, Rolf Graf (1960–2013), and the jazz singer Randi Elisabeth Graf (born 1966).

== Career ==
Graf resides in Los Angeles, US, where he is working as a keyboard player, songwriter, and producer. He has been involved in numerous projects during the years, composing much of the music in addition to playing keyboards on the albums New Born Day (1973), Ranshart (1974) and Let Your Light Shine (1976) within the band Ruphus. They received great acclaim in Norway and in several European countries, including Germany. He also played in the band 'Moose Loose' including with Jon Eberson. Later they opened the band Blow Out together. He also initiated the band Hawk on Flight with Matz Nilsson, Niels Nordin, and Ulf Wakenius. Graf has played with Pål Thowsen on several of his albums and received Spellemannprisen for best jazz album in the alternative genre. The tune "Nearly in Rio" composed by Graf was highlighted during the citation. Graf was a judge on the 1988 Spellemann Committee for the jazz category.

Graf has also cooperated with Jan Garbarek and Jon Christensen, and the trio toured extensively in Norway. This was a collaboration that started in the late 1970s. He has also released several jazz albums with his band Graffiti, accompanied by tours including Scandinavia, Germany and the US. He has a long musical career behind him, and have cooperated with a series of famous musicians such as Roger Daltrey, Alan White, Jamie Moses, Natasha Bedingfield, Phil Collins, Mark Hudson and Simon Kirke. In Norway, he has also worked with Terje Rypdal, and arranged, composed and produced the music for Finn Kalvik.

Graf also toured with renowned guitarist Frank Gambale, after being contacted by him during the 1994 Graffiti concert at Musicians Institute in Los Angeles. The collaboration led to tour the United States in 1994 and in Scandinavia in 1995. Graf has also toured with Paul Jackson and Mike Clark (bassist and drummer of Herbie Hancock's Headhunters known from legendary recordings as "Thrust"). Haakon was musical director for jazz clubs Hothouse, Jazz Alive and Blue Monk 80's and 90's.

Lately Graf has been touring with his own Haakon Graf Trio including Erik Smith (drums) and Per Mathisen (bass), releasing the album License to Chill (2010), and appearing on the 2013 Kongsberg Jazzfestival.

Keyboard Player magazine reviews Graf as "a spirited and intelligent player. Rather than exhaust the audience with non-stop flash, he builds his solos carefully, keeping the listener interested from beginning to end. He has chops to spare, but never scoundrels them. I can't wait to hear more from him".

The Coast Radio, Las Vegas when reviewing Graf states: "Haakon's talent is never ending, he has great passion for his music. He is one whose talents need to be recognized in his ability to write and create great compositions. The Coast Radio and myself MJ have enjoyed his music and his interview. Haakon is very professional, and I wish him all the best in his projects to come and hope to hear more of him in 2011."

== Selected discography ==
=== Ruphus ===
- 1973: New Born Day (Polydor)
- 1974: Ranshart (Polydor)
- 1976: Let Your Light Shine (Polydor)

=== Vanessa ===
- 1975: City Lips (On)

=== Håkon Graf / Sveinung Hovensjø / Jon Eberson / Jon Christensen ===
- 1977: Blow Out (Compendium)

=== Hawk on Flight ===
- 1979: In Time for Hawk on Flight (Nordisc)
- 1980: Hawk on Flight (Amar)
- 1984: Blue Eyed (Four Leaf)

=== Håkon Graf / Jon Christensen / Sveinung Hovensjø ===
- 1982: Hideaway (Strawberry)

=== deLillos ===
- 1991: Varme Mennesker (Sonet)

=== Graffiti ===
- 1994: Good Groove (Lipstick)

=== Haakon Graf Trio, including with Per Mathisen and Erik Smith ===
- 2010: License to Chill (Nordic)
- 2016: Sunrain (Losen)
