= Lifelines (Arild Andersen album) =

Studio album by Arild Andersen
- Released: 1981
- Recorded: July 1980
- Studio: Talent Studios; Oslo, Norway
- Genre: Jazz
- Length: 42:46
- Label: ECM 1188
- Producer: Manfred Eicher

Arild Andersen chronology
Green Shading Into Blue (1978)	Lifelines (1981)	A Molde Concert (1981)

Lifelines is the fourth album by Norwegian jazz bassist and composer Arild Andersen, recorded in July 1980 and released on ECM the following year The quartet features Kenny Wheeler on flugelhorn and cornet, Steve Dobrogosz on piano and Paul Motian on drums.

== Track listing ==
All compositions by Arild Andersen except as indicated

1. "Cameron" (6:23)
2. "Prelude" (Steve Dobrogosz) - (5:53)
3. "Landloper" (0:48)
4. "Predawn" (6:02)
5. "Dear Kenny" (6:20)
6. "A Song I Used to Play" (2:42)
7. "Lifelines" (6:28)
8. "Anew" (Radka Toneff) - (8:30)

== Personnel ==
- Arild Andersen – double bass
- Kenny Wheeler – flugelhorn & cornet
- Steve Dobrogosz – piano
- Paul Motian – drums

== Credits ==
- Manfred Eicher – producer
- Jan Erik Kongshaug – engineer
- Klaus Detjen – design
- Gabor Attalai – cover photo: "Damaged Bag of Records"
