= Lars Jansson (composer) =

Swedish jazz pianist and composer (born 1951)

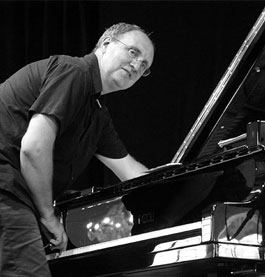

Background information
- Born: 1951 (age 74–75); Sweden
- Genres: Jazz
- Occupations: Musician, composer
- Instrument: Piano

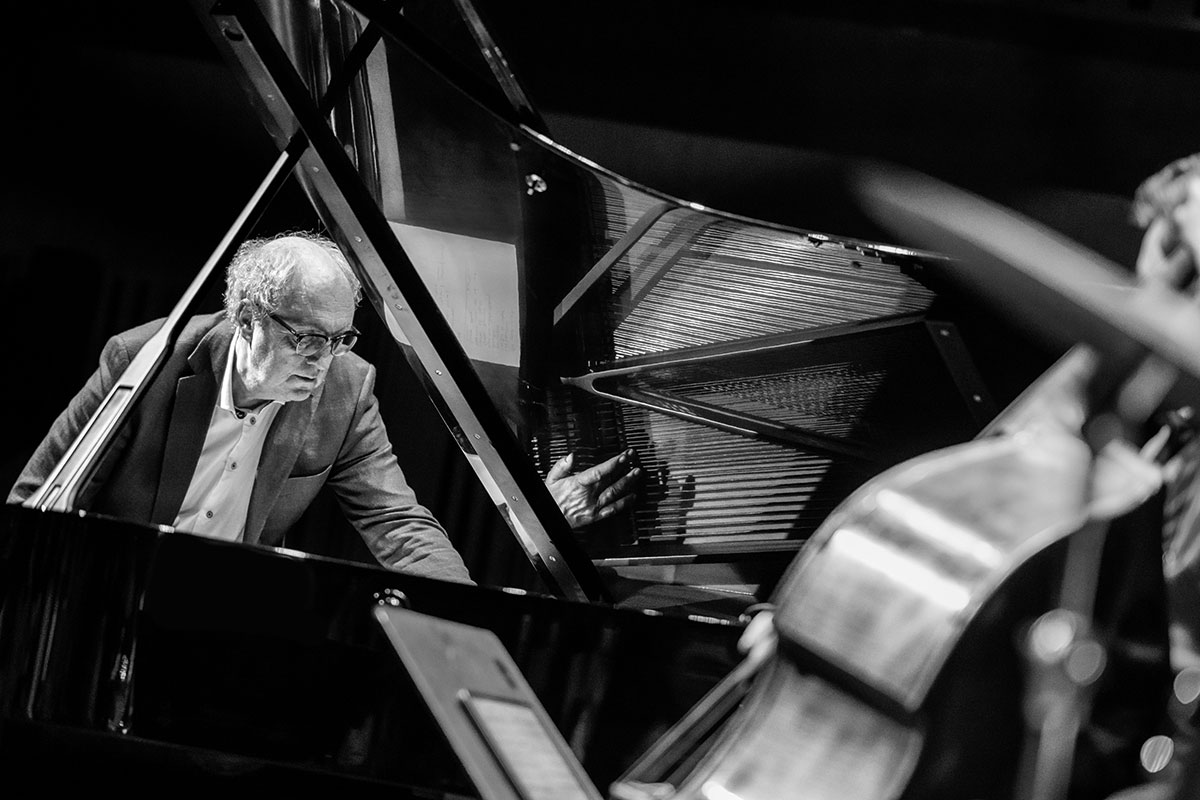
Aarhus, Denmark 2022 Photo Hreinn Gudlaugsson

Lars Jansson (born 1951) is a Swedish jazz pianist and composer.

== Life ==
Jansson grew up in Örebro, Sweden, where he was bored by his lessons at the community music school. In his early teens, a relative lent him records of Miles Davis, Ben Webster, and Mose Allison. During the 1960s, he followed the fashion and developed an interest in the organ. He listened to Kjell Öhman play with the Telstars, to Jimmy Smith and Jack McDuff, and to Hammond organ music. Drummer Sjunne Ferger became an important figure in his life, and together they formed a duo: "Takt & Ton" (Beat & Pitch).

In 1970, after graduation from upper secondary school, he took a semester off, planning to go on and study medicine. He ended up at dental school, but after a year and a half he decided to switch to music. He was accepted at the Göteborg College of Music, where all the professional musicians had their jam sessions at night. That gave him the opportunity to play with Ove Johansson, Jan Forslund, Conny Sjökvist, Gilbert Holmström, Gunnar Lindgren, and others, and he discovered Herbie Hancock, McCoy Tyner, Paul Bley, Bill Evans, Lennie Tristano, Keith Jarrett, and Chick Corea.

Lars became a member of Björn Alke's quartet, with Gunnar Bergsten. He also played with the Arild Andersen Quartet. He went on to play with Radka Toneff and various Norwegian musicians, including Knut Riisnaes and Jan Garbarek, and then with Hawk on Flight, Equinox, Red Mitchell, Joakim Milder, Crystal Eagle, and many other groups, both Swedish and Danish. Today, the Lars Jansson trio is, and has long been, one of the most well-renowned jazz groups in Sweden. Originally, the other two members were Anders Jormin and Anders Kjellberg. Lars Danielsson succeeded Jormin as the trio's bass player in the mid-1980s, and since January 2005 he has been succeeded by Christian Spering. Lars Jansson Trios member are now Thomas Fonnesbaek-bass (Copenhagen) and his son Paul Svanberg (Stockholm) on drums.

== Discography ==
=== As leader ===
Year recorded	Title	Label	Notes
1984	Trio 84		Trio, with Anders Jormin (bass), Anders Kjelberg (drums)
1987	The Eternal Now	Ton Art	Trio, with Lars Danielsson (bass, cello), Anders Kjelberg (drums)
1991	A Window Towards Being	Imogena	Most tracks trio, with Lars Danielsson (bass), Anders Kjelberg (drums); some tracks quartet, with Brynjar Hoff (oboe) added
1995	Invisible Friends	Imogena	Trio, with Lars Danielsson (bass), Anders Kjelberg (drums)
1996	The Time We Have	Imogena	Trio, with Lars Danielsson (bass), Anders Kjelberg (drums)
1996	The Blue Pearl	Phono Suecia	With the Bohuslän Big Band
1998	One Poem, One Painting	Imogena	With the Bohuslän Big Band
1999?	Hope	Spice of Life	Trio, with Lars Danielsson (bass), Anders Kjelberg (drums)
2001?	At Ease	Spice of Life	Trio, Mori Yasuhito (bass), Anders Kjellberg (drums); in concert
2000 Jan 25-27	Giving Receiving	Imogena	Sextet, with Paolo Fresu (trumpet, flugelhorn), Paul McCandless (English horn, soprano sax, bass clarinet); Johan Borgström (tenor sax), Christian Spering (bass), Morten Lund (drums)
2002?	Witnessing	Imogena	Trio, with Lars Danielsson (bass), Anders Kjelberg (drums)
2003	Temenos	Spice of Life	With the Bohuslän Big Band
2004	I Am That	Imogena	Trio, with Lars Danielsson (bass), Anders Kjelberg (drums)
2005?	Sound Pictures	Spice of Life	Duo, with Tommy Kotter (piano)
2008?	Worship of Self	Amuse	With Christian Spering (bass), Anders Kjellberg (drums), Ensemble MidtVest
2010	What's New	Spice of Life/Naxos	Trio, with Thomas Fonnesbak (bass), Paul Svanberg (drums)
2011?	In Search of Lost Time	Prophone	Trio, with Christian Spering (bass), Anders Kjelberg (drums)
2012?	Koan	Spice of Life	Trio, with Thomas Fonnesbak (bass), Paul Svanberg (drums)
2014?	Everything I Love	Spice of Life	With Ove Ingemarsson (tenor sax), Thomas Fonnesbak (bass), Paul Svanberg (drums)
2015?	Facing the Wall	Spice of Life	Trio, with Thomas Fonnesbak (bass), Paul Svanberg (drums)
2016?	More Human	Spice of Life	Trio, with Thomas Fonnesbak (bass), Paul Svanberg (drums)
2018?	Just This	Storyville	Trio, with Thomas Fonnesbak (bass), Paul Svanberg (drums)

=== Compilations ===
- Ballads (Imogena, 1991–97)

=== As sideman ===
With Arild Andersen

- Shimri (ECM, 1976)
- Green Shading into Blue (ECM, 1978)

With Hans Ulrik

- Strange World (STUNT, 1994)

With Ove Ingemarsson

- Heart of the Matter
- New Blues

== Gallery ==
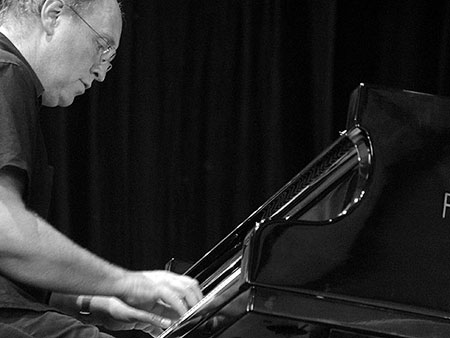

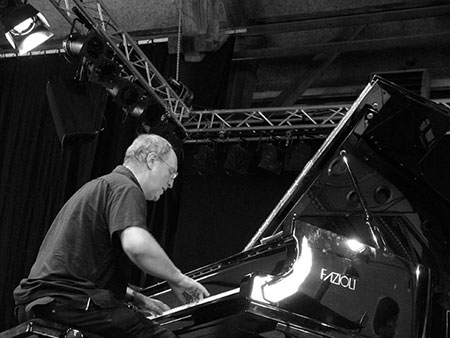

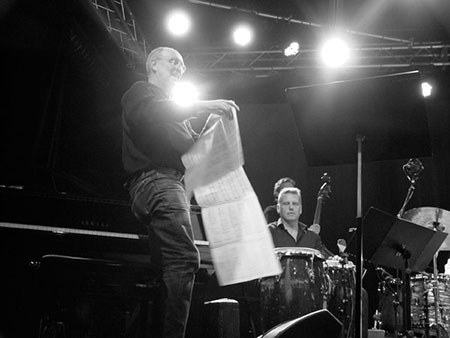
