= Hawk on Flight =

Swedish jazz fusion band

- Origin: Sweden
- Genres: jazz fusion
- Years active: 1976-present
- Labels: Nordisc, Amar Records, Four Leaf Records, Public Road Records, Heads Up International, Imogena Records, Norske Albumklassikere
- Members: Matz Nilsson; Staffan William-Olsson; Björn Arkö; Marcos Ubeda; Zoltán Csörsz
- Past members: Haakon Graf; Ulf Wakenius; Niels Nordin; Lars Jansson; Raymond Karlsson; Ove Ingemarsson; Niklas Hedin; Dan Helgesson; Fredrik Adlers; Christer Sjöström; Göran Klinghagen; Terje Sundby; Håkan Glänte

Hawk on Flight is a Swedish jazz fusion band formed in Gothenburg in 1976. Well known Swedish jazz musicians such as Ulf Wakenius and Lars Jansson have been members of the band, and their original lineup featured Norwegian keyboardist Haakon Graf. The group released studio albums between the years 1979 to 1994 and disbanded in 1996, but reunited in 2006 and still plays in Swedish jazz clubs as of 2024.

== History ==
=== Original lineup (1976–1982) ===
Formed in 1976, the original lineup for Hawk on Flight consisted of Ulf Wakenius on guitar, Haakon Graf on keyboards, Matz Nilsson on bass and Niels Nordin on drums. Graf and Nilsson had previously been members of the recently disbanded Norwegian fusion group Moose Loose. Not having released any albums at the time, they toured around scandinavian countries, becoming somewhat successful in Sweden, Norway and Denmark. Their first album, In Time For Hawk on Flight, was released by Nordisc in 1979 and covered a wide range of jazz fusion styles, from jazz rock to Herbie Hancock-inspired jazz funk. The band released their second and self titled album in 1980 on the Amar Records label with the same lineup. This time, most of the tunes have a style that more closely borrows from progressive rock.

=== First lineup changes and Blue Eyed (1982–1984) ===
In 1982, there were some significant changes in Hawk on Flight’s lineup. Graf was replaced by the well-renowned Swedish pianist Lars Jansson, and Raymond Karlsson took Nordin’s place as the group’s drummer. In 1984, they released Blue Eyed, published by Four Leaf Records. This album has a style closer to jazz as well as a more accessible sound featuring typical timbres found in 80s music, such as Yamaha's DX7 synthesizer. Most compositions were contributed by Jansson. In October that same year, performances of "Quasimodo" and "Wings of Freedom" - referred to as "Fönster mot Marken" - from Blue Eyed were broadcast on the Sverige TV2 TV channel. After this album, Ulf Wakenius left the band and Matz Nilsson remained as the only original member.

=== Matz Nilsson and Hawk on Flight (1985–1996) ===
Soon after Blue Eyed, Staffan William-Olsson replaced Ulf Wakenius on guitar, and the band recorded the album Talk of the Town in 1985 under the name Matz Nilsson & Hawk on Flight, which would be adopted on all of their future releases. It was published in 1986, once again by Four Leaf Records. While Lars Jansson did contribute some compositions for this release similar to those on Blue Eyed, most of the tracks, some of which feature a style closer to smooth jazz, were written by Nilsson.

Following the release of Talk of the Town, the group started to go through more lineup changes. The group now consisted of Matz Nilsson, Staffan William-Olsson and Raymond Karlsson in addition to Dan Helgesson on keyboards, Ove Ingemarsson on tenor saxophone and Niklas Hedin on percussion. This iteration of the group more closely followed a smooth jazz oriented style, benefiting from the addition of a sax player, and was composed entirely by Nilsson. This lineup was featured on the Sverige TV2 show "Moment", recorded at Liseberg, in 1987. Around this time, they also played at the Stockholm Jazz Festival.

The new compositions were finally released in 1989 on the album Bermuda Triangle, with Helgesson being replaced by Fredrik Adlers, Per Lindvall replacing Karlsson and Michael Ruff contributing vocals on two of the tracks. The following year, the album was published in the US by Heads Up International under the name Moonroom. In 1991, Matz Nilsson & Hawk on Flight released Wind From The Sea, an album with a similar style and lineup as Bermuda Triangle, featuring Christer Sjöström on drums and Göran Klinghagen on guitar. Both albums were published in Sweden by Public Road Records.

The band’s last release, Fly Free Faster, was published by Imogena Records in 1994, with Terje Sundby on drums and Håkan Glänte on keyboards. This time, the compositions were more laidback compared to the two previous albums, and while the style was still mostly oriented towards smooth jazz, it was closer to jazz and less pop-oriented. The group broke up in 1996.

=== Reunion (2006–present) ===
Even though Hawk on Flight hasn’t released any albums since Fly Free Faster, the band reunited in 2006 and still plays in jazz clubs around Sweden, such as Fasching and Nefertiti. Their current lineup consists of Matz Nilsson (bass), Zoltán Csörsz (drums), Björn Arkö (sax), Marcos Ubeda (keys) and the returning Staffan William-Olsson (guitar). The first two albums with the original lineup have been reissued on CD by the Norske Albumklassikere label.

== Discography ==
- In Time for Hawk on Flight (Nordisc, 1979)
- Hawk on Flight (Amar Records, 1980)
- Blue Eyed (Four Leaf Records, 1984)
- Talk of the Town (Four Leaf Records, 1986)
- Bermuda Triangle/Moonroom (Public Road Records, 1989/Heads Up International, 1990)
- Wind from the Sea (Public Road Records, 1991)
- Fly Free Faster (Imogena Records, 1994)
