= Clouds in My Head =

Studio album by Arild Andersen
- Released: 1975
- Recorded: February 1975
- Studios: Arne Bendiksen Studio; Oslo, Norway
- Genre: Jazz
- Length: 37:39
- Label: ECM 1059 ST
- Producer: Manfred Eicher

Arild Andersen chronology
Clouds in My Head (1975)	Shimri (1977)

Clouds in My Head is the debut album by Norwegian jazz bassist and composer Arild Andersen, recorded in February 1975 and released on ECM later that year. The quartet features saxophonist Knut Riisnæs, pianist Jon Balke, and drummer Pål Thowsen.

== Reception ==
The AllMusic review awarded the album 3 stars.

Professional ratings
Review scores
Source	Rating
AllMusic	3/5 stars

== Track listing ==
All tracks are written by Arild Andersen.

Side I
No.	Title	Length
1.	"305 W 18 St"	3:49
2.	"Last Song"	3:09
3.	"Outhouse"	7:49
4.	"Song for a Sad Day"	7:02

Side II
No.	Title	Length
1.	"Clouds in My Head"	3:26
2.	"Cycles"	6:14
3.	"SIV"	3:34
4.	"The Sword under His Wings"	9:44

== Personnel ==
- Arild Andersen – bass
- Knut Riisnæs – tenor saxophone, soprano saxophone, flute
- Jon Balke – piano
- Pål Thowsen – drums
