= Panzerballett =

German band

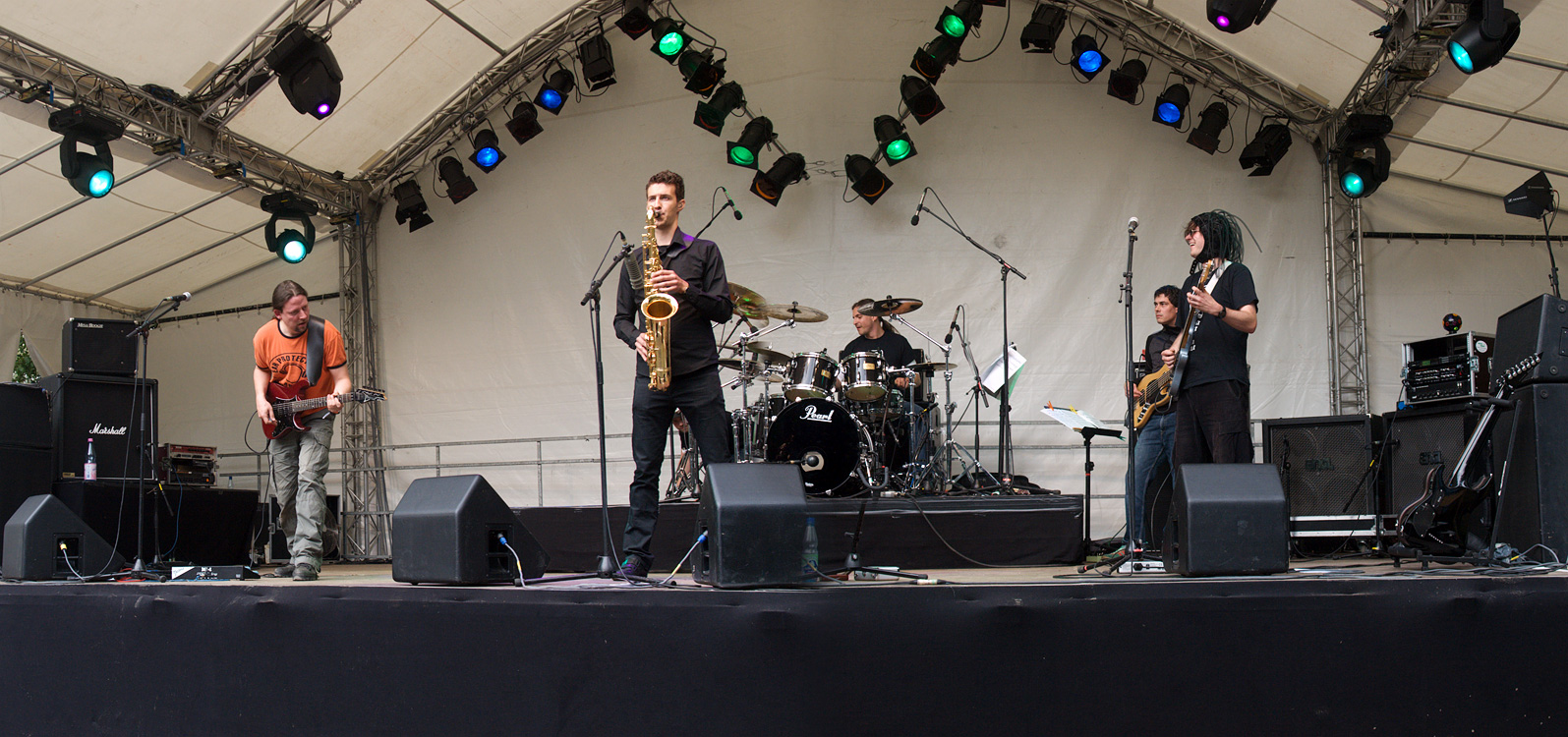
- Panzerballet, Offside Festival 2008, Geldern/Germany left to right: Martin Mayrhofer, Alexander von Hagke, Sebastian Lanser, Heiko Jung, Jan Zehrfeld

Background information
- Origin: Munich, Germany
- Genres: Jazz metal, progressive metal, funk metal, instrumental rock
- Years active: 2004–present
- Label: ACT Records
- Members: Jan Zehrfeld; Joe Doblhofer; Alexander von Hagke; Heiko Jung; Sebastian Lanser
- Past members: Gregor Bürger; Florian Schmidt; Andreas Dombert; Max Bucher; Martin Mayrhofer
- Website: Official website

Panzerballett is a quintet from Munich led by guitarist, composer and arranger Jan Zehrfeld. Their musical style is best described as jazz-metal.

== Band history ==
After several years of searching, classically trained guitarist Jan Zehrfeld joined several musicians together with the idea of forming a jazz metal band. Zehrfeld felt that he was always angry at something, and that this music was a way to channel his aggression. In 2005, Panzerballett released their self-titled debut album and became part of the German progressive rock scene. The band went on to play a series of concerts in the Munich region, but also performed at the 15th National Youth Jazz Festival in Leipzig and the renowned Burg Herzberg Festival. A DVD was compiled from those shows and titled Live at Backstage Munich 2006. After several line-up changes in 2007, the jazz label ACT contracted the band and in February 2008 released their second album, Starke Stücke. A small tour of Germany began after the release of this album, and the album reached the 26th place on the German Jazz charts. In 2008, multiple concerts and cameo appearances were made, including the Zappanale, the Leverkusen Jazz Festival opening for John McLaughlin and Chick Corea, the Baltic Prog Fest and the self-organized Metal Jazz Festival in Munich. Short television appearances were also done. In August 2009, Panzerballett released their third album, Hart Genossen - Von ABBA bis Zappa. In September 2009, the album jumped to # 25 on the jazz charts and appeared in the drum magazine Drums and Percussion as the January 2010 "Record of the Month". The band then played multiple shows and cameo appearances throughout Germany (including as a guest of the Arte Lounge and in on3 Radio).

== Music ==
The band has noted their influences to be classic jazz and funk artists and also heavy progressive metal artists; they play both original compositions by guitarist Zehrfeld and his creative arrangements of popular songs from rock ("Smoke on the Water" by Deep Purple), metal ("Bleed" by Meshuggah), pop ("Ein Bisschen Frieden" by Nicole), to jazz ("Birdland" by Weather Report) to soundtrack (as the title theme The Simpsons or "Mahna Mahna"). The song Iron Maiden Voyage shows these diverse influences; the song's name is a pun on the name of the band metal band Iron Maiden and the Jazz Standard Maiden Voyage by Herbie Hancock). An important feature of the band's music is the virtuosity of their performance; the band's members have studied with award-winning musicians to master their instruments at a high technical level. One example of their technical skill are the highly complex polyrhythmic structures the band uses in their compositions.

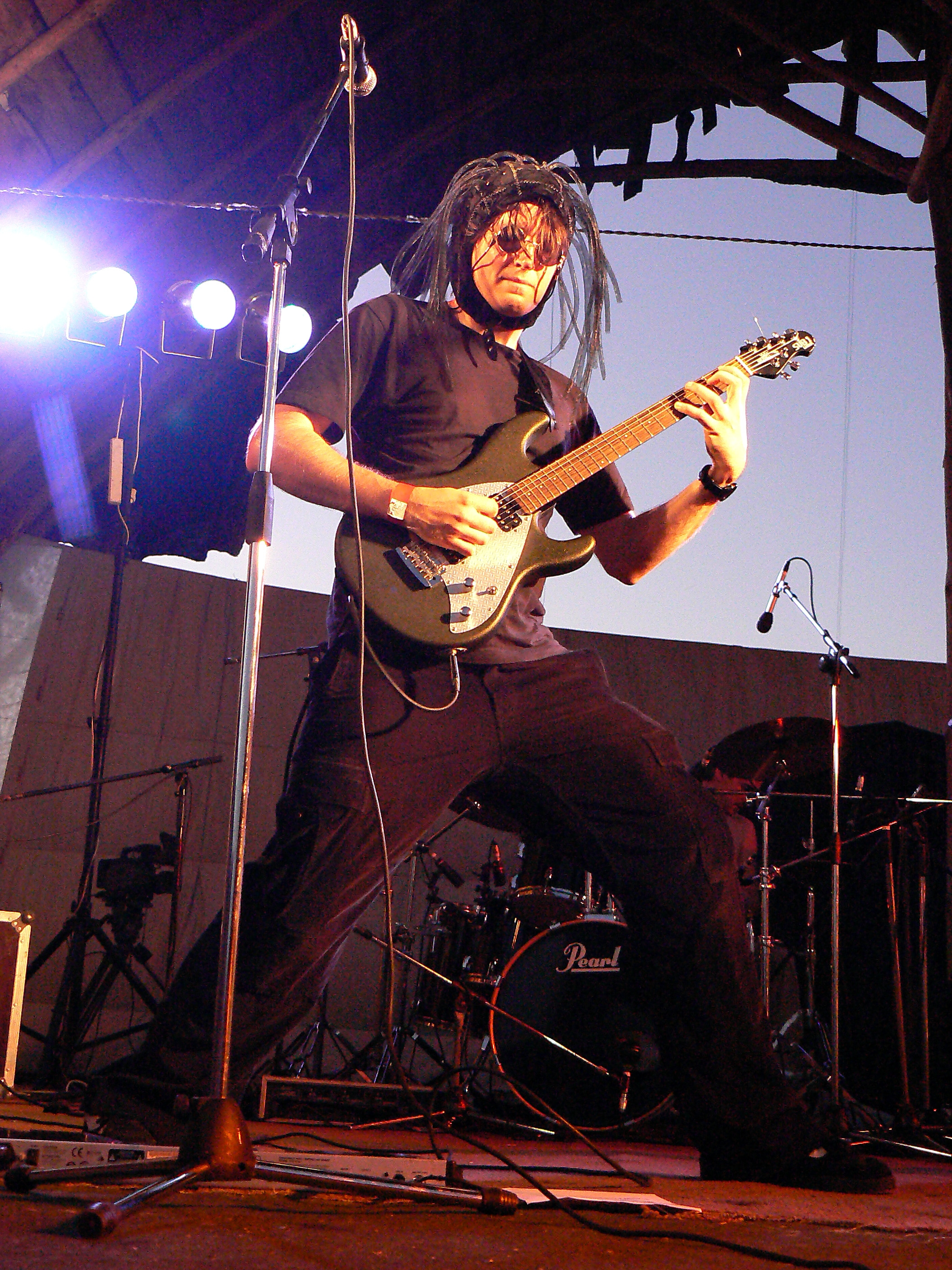
Jan Zehrfeld wearing his Oakley Medusa leather cap and "dancing" on stage

Die Zeit writes about Panzerballett: "Ihre eigenen Stücke flankieren sie mit einer Reihe von Hardrock-, Jazz- und Entertainment-Gassenhauern, die sie mit der tadellosen Technik an deutschen Hochschulen ausgebildeter Musiker so vorbehaltlos zerschreddern und neu zusammensetzen, dass Wiedererkennungseffekt und Staunen sich die Waage halten" (roughly "Their own compositions are intermingled with a number of jazz, rock and entertainment standards which the musicians thoroughly deconstruct, using impeccable skills gained at German music conservatories. They then rebuild the works into new performances carefully balancing recognition with astonishment.") The band describes their own music as "delicate interlocking funk grooves with brutally hard, rhythmically complex riffs and jazz improvisation combined with ska-Death-Jazz" or like "hacking with a white-hot flail into grandma's freshly-baked ruebli-cake". As musical influences, the band notes bands like Meshuggah, Tribal Tech, Planet X and Mats Morgan as the main source of their inspiration. In 2020 the album Planet Z saw the addition of a seven-piece horn section on the song "No One is Flying the Plane" by American jazz composer Jeff Novotny (the composer's original recording had been released the previous year).

== Concerts ==
Panzerballett is also known for exceptional concerts. The humor of the band, which is only hinted at on the band's albums (e.g. in song titles or the vocal pieces with Conny Kreitmeier on songs like Zickenterror), becomes more apparent during live performances. Particularly guitarist Zehrfeld delivers exaggerated facial expressions and gestures dances and jumps around excessively, while sporting sunglasses and a dreadlock wig made out of cables. His announcements and banter resemble those of Helge Schneider at times.

== Personnel ==
- Jan Zehrfeld - lead guitars
- Joe Doblhofer - rhythm guitars
- Heiko Jung - bass
- Alexander von Hagke - saxophone
- Sebastian Lanser - drums

== Discography ==
- 2005 - Panzerballett
- 2007 - Live at Backstage Munich 2006 (DVD)
- 2008 - Starke Stücke
- 2009 - Hart Genossen - Von ABBA bis Zappa
- 2012 - Tank Goodness
- 2013 - Live at Theatron Munich 2013 (DVD)
- 2015 - Breaking Brain
- 2017 - X-Mas Death Jazz
- 2020 - Planet Z
- 2025 - Übercode Œuvre
