= Green Shading into Blue =

Album by Arild Andersen

Studio album by the Arild Andersen Quartet
- Released: 1978
- Recorded: April 1978
- Studio: Talent Studios; Oslo, Norway
- Genre: Jazz
- Length: 45:46
- Label: ECM 1127
- Producer: Manfred Eicher

Arild Andersen chronology
Shimri (1976)	Green Shading into Blue (1978)	Lifelines (1980)

Green Shading into Blue an album by the Arild Andersen Quartet. It was recorded in April 1978 and released on ECM later that year. The quartet features saxophonist Juhani Aaltonen, and rhythm section Lars Jansson, Andersen and Pål Thowsen.

== Reception ==
The AllMusic review by Jim Todd stated: "This is an outstanding group of individual talents who can communicate musically with one another at the highest level. For the 1978 follow-up, though, incongruous elements have now been grafted on here and there: occasional bits of string synthesizer, 'soft rock' riffing, passages of sensitive, new age noodling. The result is neither particularly commercial, nor especially good jazz, relative to the players who made it."

Professional ratings
Review scores
Source	Rating
AllMusic	2/5 stars

== Track listing ==
All compositions by Arild Andersen except as indicated

1. "Sole" - 9:33
2. "The Guitarist" - 3:57
3. "Anima" (Lars Jansson) - 9:00
4. "Radka's Samba" - 4:10
5. "Terhi" (Jansson) - 3:02
6. "Green Shading into Blue" - 9:04
7. "Jana" - 7:00

== Personnel ==
=== Arild Andersen Quartet ===
- Juhani Aaltonen – tenor saxophone, soprano saxophone, flute
- Lars Jansson – piano, moog synthesizer, string ensemble
- Arild Andersen – bass
- Pål Thowsen – drums, percussion
