= A Molde Concert =

Molde Concert

Live album by Arild Andersen
- Released: 1982
- Recorded: August 1981
- Venue: Moldejazz; Molde, Norway
- Genre: Jazz
- Length: 78:45
- Label: ECM 1236
- Producer: Manfred Eicher

Arild Andersen chronology
Lifelines (1980)	Molde Concert (1982)	Sagn (1990)

Molde Concert is a live album by Norwegian jazz bassist and composer Arild Andersen recorded at the Molde Jazz Festival in August 1981 and released on ECM the following year. The quartet features guitarist Bill Frisell, pianist John Taylor, and drummer Alphonse Mouzon.

== Track listing ==
All compositions by Arild Andersen except as indicated

1. "Cherry Tree" - 7:04
2. "Targeta" - 7:25
3. "Six for Alphonse" - 8:24 Bonus track on CD reissue
4. "Nutune" - 7:34 Bonus track on CD reissue
5. "Lifelines" (Arild Andersen, Radka Toneff) - 4:01
6. "The Sword Under His Wings" - 13:19
7. "Commander Schmuck's Earflap Hat" - 4:40
8. "Koral" - 7:02
9. "Cameron" - 9:37
10. "A Song I Used to Play" - 4:55 Bonus track on CD reissue
11. "Dual Mr. Tillman Anthony" (Miles Davis) - 4:40 Bonus track on CD reissue

== Personnel ==
- Arild Andersen – bass
- Bill Frisell – guitar
- John Taylor – piano
- Alphonse Mouzon – drums
