= Shimri (album) =

Studio album by Arild Andersen
- Released: 1977
- Recorded: October 1976
- Studio: Talent Studios; Oslo, Norway
- Genre: Jazz
- Length: 41:40
- Label: ECM; ECM 1082 ST
- Producer: Manfred Eicher

Arild Andersen chronology
Clouds in My Head (1975)	Shimri (1977)	Green Shading into Blue (1978)

Shimri is the second album by Norwegian jazz bassist and composer Arild Andersen, recorded in October 1976 and released on ECM the following year. Andersen's quartet features saxophonist Juhani Aaltonen, pianist Lars Jansson, and drummer Pål Thowsen.

== Reception ==
Professional ratings
Review scores
Source	Rating
AllMusic	2.5/5 stars

The AllMusic review by Jim Todd states, "On Shimri, musical release floats in suspension, grooves are coyly offered then withdrawn, swing is used sparingly, subtly, making only an occasional splash in the ripples of intimate conversation among the members of Arlid Andersen's outstanding quartet."

== Track listing ==
All tracks are written by Arild Andersen except as noted

Side I
No.	Title	Length
1.	"Shimri"	5:55
2.	"No Tears"	9:27
3.	"Ways of Days"	4:47
Total length:		20:09

Side II
No.	Title	Writer(s)	Length
1.	"Wood Song"	Andersen; Aaltonen; Jansson; Thowsen	6:02
2.	"Vaggvisa för Hanna"	Jansson	3:46
3.	"Dedication"		11:43
Total length:			21:31 41:40

== Personnel ==
=== Musicians ===
- Arild Andersen – bass
- Juhani Aaltonen – tenor saxophone, soprano saxophone, flute, percussion
- Lars Jansson – piano
- Pål Thowsen – drums

=== Technical personnel ===
- Manfred Eicher – producer
- Jan Erik Kongshaug – engineer
- Dieter Bonhorst – layout
- Lajos Keresztes – cover photography
- Rune Myhre – photography (back cover)
