= Peter Almqvist =

Swedish jazz guitarist

- Born: 17 July 1957; Lund, Sweden
- Died: 6 April 2015 (aged 57)
- Genres: Jazz
- Occupation: Musician
- Instrument: Guitar
- Labels: Storyville
- Formerly of: Guitars Unlimited

Peter Almqvist (17 July 1957 – 6 April 2015) was a Swedish jazz guitarist who started the duo Guitars Unlimited with Ulf Wakenius.

== Career ==
Almqvist started playing guitar after hearing the Beatles. His introduction to jazz came from his father's record collection. A native of Sweden, he took lessons in London from guitarist Ike Isaacs.

Almqvist and guitarist Ulf Wakenius founded the acoustic jazz duo Guitars Unlimited. From 1982–'83, Almqvist worked with violinist Svend Asmussen. In the 1990s, he started a trio that toured with Art Farmer and made an album with pianist Horace Parlan.

Almqvist died at the age of 57, 6 April 2015.

== Discography ==
- Dig Myself & I (Storyville, 1995)
- With Horace Parlan (Storyville, 1997)
- My Sound: Solos and Duets (Storyville, 2001)
