= Conny Kreitmeier =

German musician

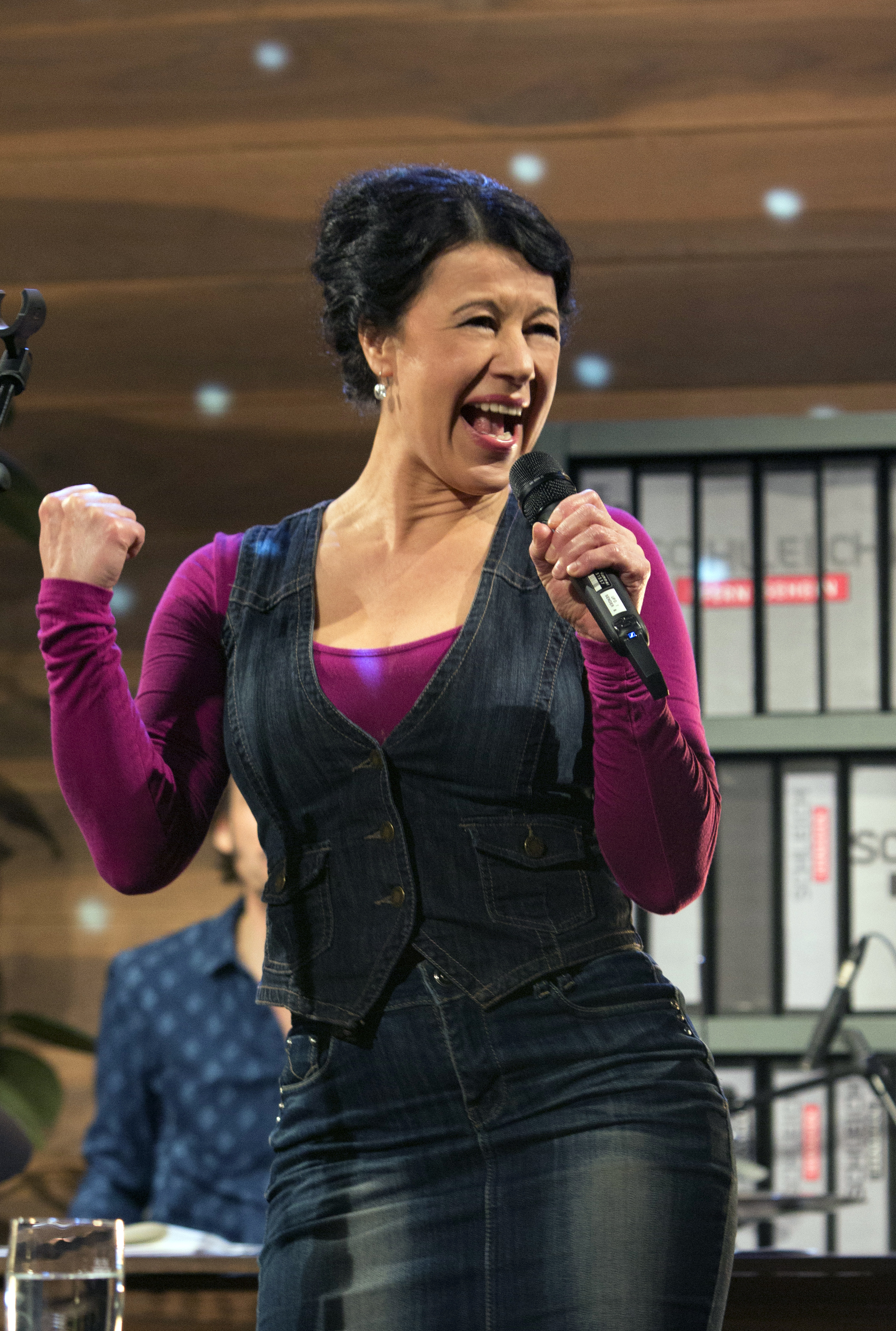

Cornelia "Conny" Kreitmeier (born August 2, 1971) is a German singer, cabaret artist, entertainer, and composer. Until 2024, she was the lead singer of the band, "The Heimatdamisch."

She is credited as a contributor to the German-language soundtrack of Dragonball Z, recording lead vocals for the songs Bist Du Bereit? and Generation Z. She received the DRAGONBALL Z GOLD Award in 2002 for selling over 150,000 CDs.

She also recorded vocals for Digimon: Digital Monsters Vol. 2 and Yu-Gi-Oh!'s German soundtrack.

== Personal ==
Kreitmeier was born on August 2, 1971, in Munich, Germany. Until 2024, she was lead singer with German polka cover band, The Heimatdamisch, which covers numerous songs ranging from "Highway to Hell", to "Like a Virgin" in polka style.

== Publications ==
CDs:

- Ms. Komma Dog: Zünglein / 1996 / F. Blieninger Music Productions, LC 2210
- U-Turn: Arruda mosaique / 1997 / Wolpertinger Records, LC 8710
- Bürger Kreitmeier Orchestra: Happy Home / 2003 / Single Malt Records, LC 10111
- Bürger Kreitmeier Orchestra: Come to My Bed / 1999 / Wega Music, LC 01835
- Orchestra Bürger Kreitmeier: My Brain Is Empty / 2002 / MTA Music, LC 19042002
- Franz-David Baumann Quintet feat. Conny Kreitmeier, vocals: ...and the world is raging outside / 2016 / Panama Records, LC 12519
- The Heimatdamisch: Circus Oberkrain / 2019 / Bergbeatmusic

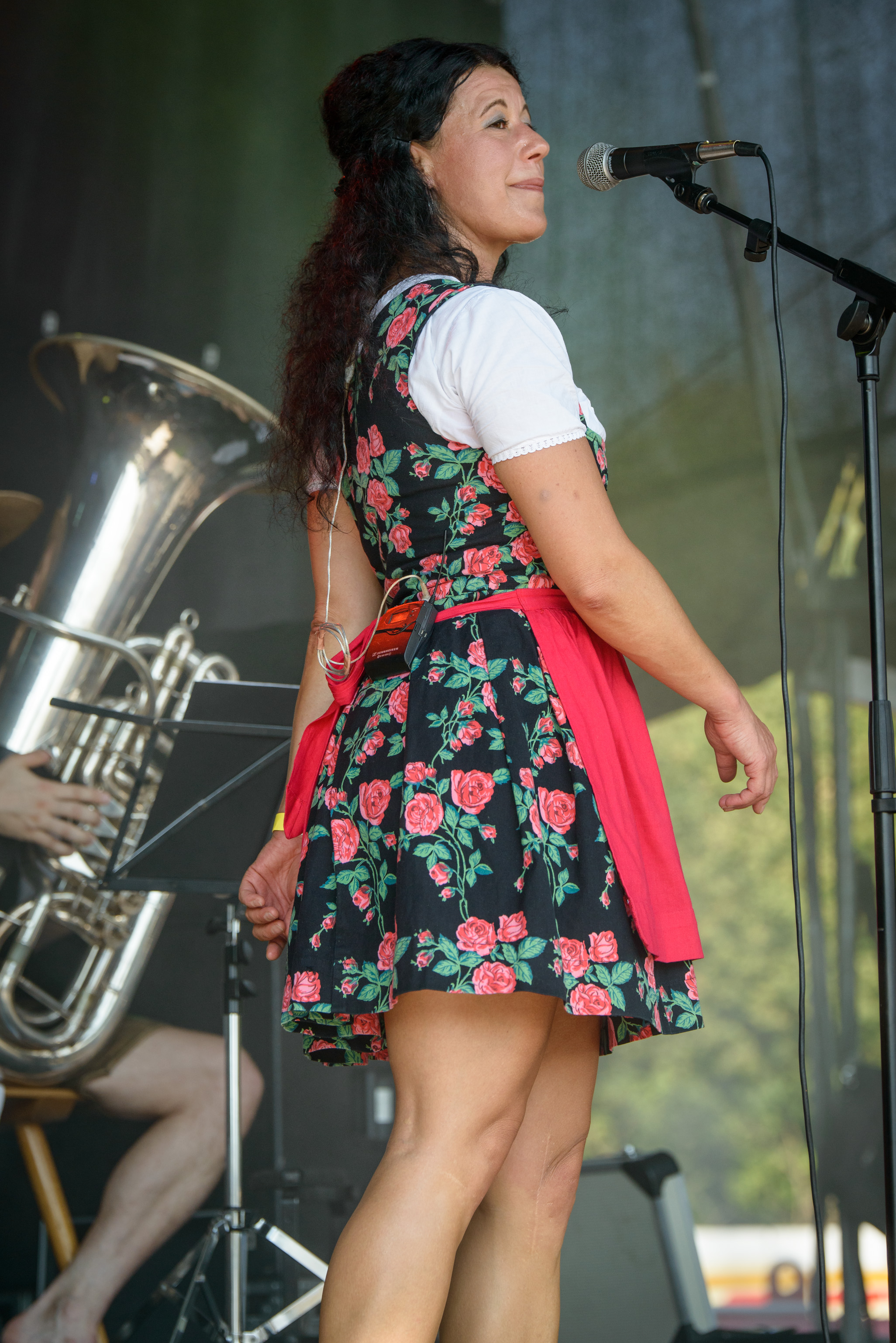
Conny Kreitmeier as frontwoman of the band "The Heimatdamisch" at Brass Wiesn festival 2015
