= Kjell Öhman =

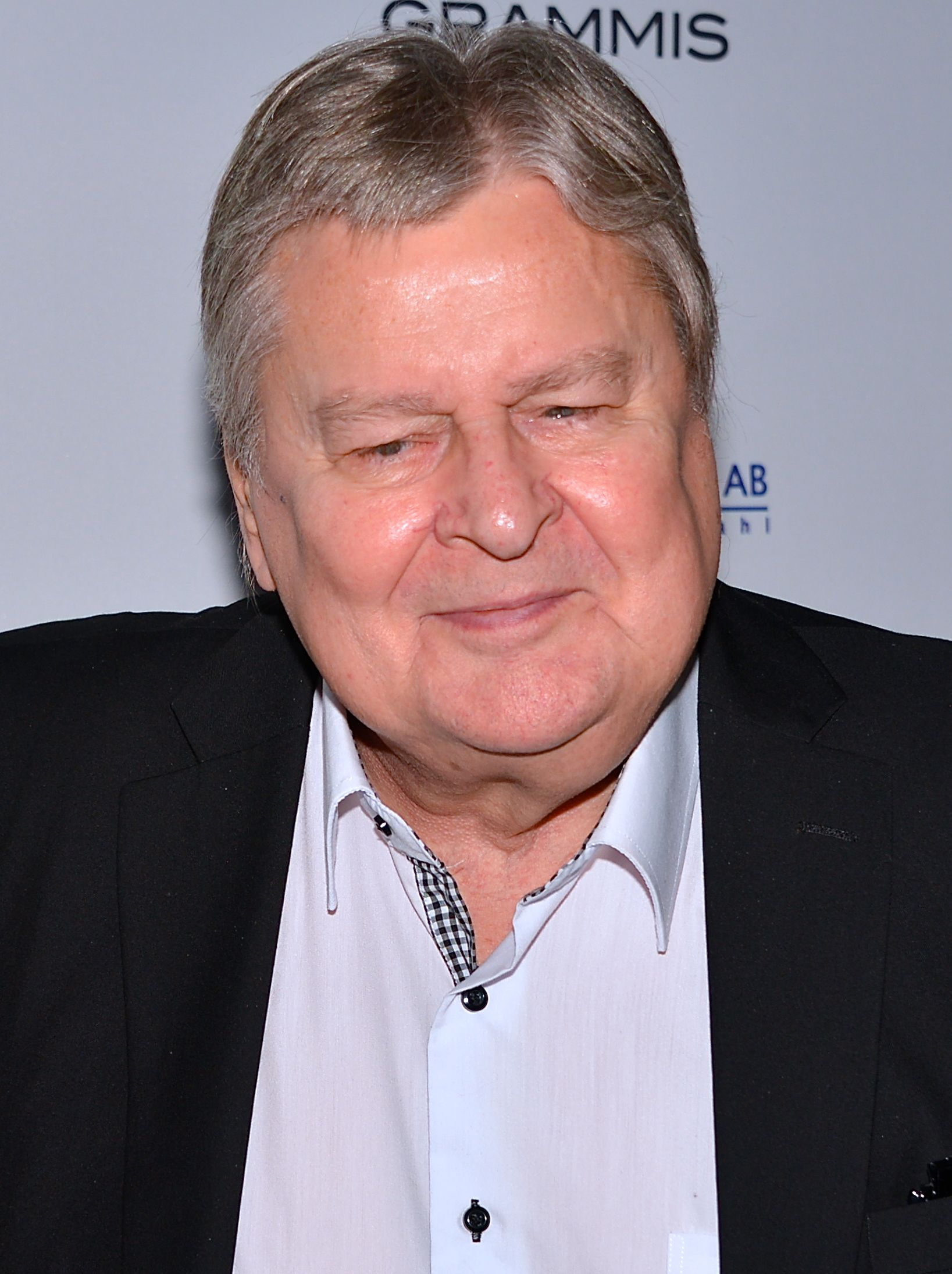
- Kjell Öhman

Background information
- Born: 3 September 1943; Stockholm, Sweden
- Died: 5 November 2015 (aged 72); Huddinge, Sweden
- Genres: jazz, pop, rock, schlager
- Occupation: musician
- Instrument(s): piano, hammond organ, accordion
- Years active: 1960s–2010s

Kjell Ingemar Öhman (3 September 1943 – 5 November 2015) was a notable Swedish jazz musician. He worked as band leader, musical director and arranger of music albums, and of TV programs, among them Notknäckarna, Allsång på Skansen (1994–2010), Hasse och hans vänner and Café Luleå.

Öhman appeared in more than 3000 albums and worked with musicians, among them The Telstars, Marcus Österdahl, Alice Babs, Georgie Fame, Charlie Norman, Svend Asmussen, Arne Domnérus, Simons, Ulf Wakenius, Rune Gustafsson, Hans Backenroth and Ulf Lundell.

In 2006 Öhman received the Jan Johansson Scholarship.

== Discography ==
- 2012: The Duke
