= NorCD albums discography =

A discography of albums released by the label NorCD. Distributor catalogue numbers are not provided here.

== NorCD ==
- Karl Seglem, Sogn-a-song (NORCD 9101, 1991)
- Isglem (Karl Seglem/Terje Isungset), Rom (NORCD 9102, 1991)
- Roald Wichmann a.o., Lieder + balladen (NORCD 9203, 1992)
- Isglem, To steg (NORCD 9204, 1992)
- Håkon Høgemo/Karl Seglem, Utla (NORCD 9205, 1992)
- Hot Cargo (Ole Thomsen a.o.), Hot cargo (NORCD 9206, 1992)
- Karl Seglem, Rit (NORCD 9410, 1994)
- Veslefrekk, Veslefrekk (NORCD 9411, 1994)
- Det Store Eventyret (Dag Øyvind Rebnord m.fl.), Det store eventyret (NORCD 9412, 1994)
- Jacob Young, This is you (NORCD 9513, 1995)
- Utla (Håkon Høgemo/Karl Seglem/Terje Isungset), Brodd (NORCD 9515, 1995)
- Isglem, Null G (NORCD 9615, 1996)
- Jon Fosse and Karl Seglem, Prosa (NORCD 9616, 1996)
- Close Erase (Christian Wallumrød/Per Oddvar Johansen/Ingebrigt Håker Flaten), Close erase (NORCD 9619, 1996)
- Berit Opheim, Eitt steg (NOR CD 9618, 1996)
- "Det Store Eventyret" (Dag Øyvind Rebnord o.a.), Scener fra den norske drømmen (NORCD 9707, 1997)
- Karl Seglem and Reidar Skår, Tya – fra bor til bytes (NORCD 9717, 1997)
- «SAN» (Andile Yenana/Bjørn Ove Solberg/Ingebrigt Håker Flaten/Paal Nilssen-Love/Zim Nggawana), Song (NORCD 9720, 1997)
- Lorentz Hop, Hardangerfiddle (NORCD 9721, 1997)
- Øystein B. Blix Band, På en lyserød sky (NORCD 9722, 1997)
- Elin Rosseland, Fra himmelen (NORCD 9723, 1997)
- Terje Isungset, Reise (NORCD 9724, 1997)
- Olav Dale Quartet, Little Waltz (NORCD 9725, 1997)
- TINGeLING, Tingeling (NORCD 9726, 1997)
- Utla, Juv (NORCD 9309, 1997)
- Lars Underdal, Gullfakse (NORCD 9827, 1998)
- Ivar Kolve Trio, Ope (NORCD 9828, 1998)
- Åse Teigland, Dansarsteinen (NORCD 9829, 1998)
- Karl Seglem, Spir (NORCD 9830, 1998)
- Thomas Winther Andersen, Line up (NORCD 9831, 1998)
- Peter Opsvik, Woodwork (NOR CD 9932, 1999)
- Øystein B. Blix Band, Texas (NORCD 9934, 1999)
- Utla, Dans (NORCD 9935, 1999)
- Close Erase (Christian Wallumrød/Per Oddvar Johansen/Ingebrigt Håker Flaten), No. 2 (NORCD 9933, 1999)
- Håkon Høgemo, Solo (NORCD 0036, 2000)
- Småkvedarane (samt Einar Mjølsnes/Gabriel Fliflet/Ivar Kolve), Syng (NORCD 0037, 2000)
- Tri'o Trang, Liker (NORCD 0038, 2000)
- Arve Henriksen/Karl Seglem/Terje Isungset), Daa (NORCD 0039, 2000)
- Synnøve S. Bjørset, Ram (NORCD 0140, 2001)
- AKKU (Elfi Sverdrup/Lars Andreas Haug/Ruth Vilhelmine Meyer), Akku (NORCD 0142, 2001)
- A.R.S. (Arne Braathen/Rolf Pifnitzka/Stephan Kersting/Ingvar Ambjørnsen), Ambjørnsen & Bo (NORCD 0141, 2001)
- Thomas Winther Andersen, Too much bass? (NORCD 0245, 2002)
- Karl Seglem, Nye nord (NORCD 0246, 2002)
- Terje Isungset, Middle of mist (NORCD 0348, 2003)
- Cissokho System, Kaíra (NORCD 0349, 2003)
- Isglem, Fire (NORCD 0343, 2003)
- Utla with Berit Opheim, Song (NORCD 0351, 2003)
- Elin Rosseland, Moment (NORCD 0450, 2004)
- Karl Seglem, New north (NORCD 0452, 2004)
- Thomas Winther Andersen, Out from a cool storage (NORCD 0454)
- Veslefrekk, Valse mysterioso (NORCD 0347, 2004)
- Karl Seglem Femstein (NORCD 0455, 2004)
- Håkon Høgemo, Lorentz Hop, Åse Teigland, Synnøve S. Bjørset, Hardanger fiddle (NORCD 0456, 2004)
- Karl Seglem, Budda og reven (NORCD 0501X, 2005)
- "Onkelfolke" (Audun Eken/Gro Kjelleberg Solli/Knut Egil Kristiansen/Tove Solheim/Øystein Sandbukt), Kasta beine (NORCD 0558, 2005)
- Sigrid Moldestad/Einar Mjølsnes/Håkon Høgemo, Gamaltnymalt (NORCD 0553, 2005)
- Tone Lise Moberg, Looking On (NORCD 0659, 2006)
- Kobert, Daniel Buner Formo/Erik Nylander/Ingrid Lode, Glowing (NORCD 0660, 2006)
- Jon Fosse and Karl Seglem, Dikt (NORCD 0557, 2005)
- Karl Seglem, Urbs (NORCD 0661, 2006)
- Jon Fosse, Prosa og dikt (NORCD 0662, 2006)
- Jørgen Orheim/Eivind Kaasin, Minimum bow force (NORCD 0663, 2006)
- Robert Rook trio, Hymn for fall, plays Thomas Winther Andersen (NORCD 0664, 2006)
- Berit Opheim and Sigbjørn Apeland, Den blide sol (NORCD 0765, 2007)
- Eple Trio, Made this (NORCD 0766, 2007)
- Olav Dale, Dabrhahi (NORCD 0767, 2007)
- Sturla Eide, Murru (NORCD 0768, 2007)
- Elin Rosseland, Trio (NORCD 0770, 2007)
- Slagr (Amund Sjølie Sveen, Anne Hytta and Sigrun Eng), Solaris (NORCD 0771, 2007)
- BOL, Skylab (NORCD 0772, 2007)
- Norchestra, Norchestra (NORCD 0873, 2008)
- Gabriel Fliflet, Rio Aga (NORCD 0874, 2008)
- Rolf Stensland and Rolf Sagen, Filleflabben syng (NORCD 0769, 2008)
- Per Jørgensen and Terje Isungset, Agbalagba daada (NORCD 0875, 2008)
- Eple Trio, The widening sphere of influence (NORCD 0876, 2008)
- Åse Teigland, Stille (NORCD 0877, 2008)
- Berit Opheim Versto and Karl Seglem, Draumkvedet (NORCD 0978, 2009)
- Arve Henriksen and Elling Vanberg, Ellivan (NORCD 0979, 2009)
- Tromsø Kunstforsyning (Bernt Simen Lund and Øystein B. Blix), Tur (NORCD 0980, 2009)
- Glima (Helene Waage, Ragnhild Knudsen and Torunn Raftevold Rue), Tåran (NORCD 0981, 2009)
- Karl Seglem, Norskjazz.no (NORCD 0982, 2009)
- Jon Eberson trio, Born to be slow (NORCD 0983, 2009)
- Lena Skjerdal trio, Home (NORCD 0984, 2009)
- Sigbjørn Apeland, Øyvind Skarbø and Nils Økland 1982 (NORCD 0985, 2009)
- Line Horneland, Horneland (NORCD 0986, 2009)
- Diverse, Folkelarm 2009 (NORCD 0987, 2009)
- Karl Seglem, Skoddeheimen (NORCD 0988, 2009)
- Kenneth Sivertsen, Spør vinden (NORCD 0990, 2009)
- Karl Seglem, Ossicles (NORCD 10100, 2010)
- Sturla Eide, Thriller (NORCD 1089, 2010)
- Eplemøya Songlag, Eplemøya songlag (NORCD 1091, 2010)
- Amherst (Ingvild Koksvik Amundsen, Lene Anett Killingmo, Ellen Andrea Wang, Lars Jakob Rudjord), A light exists in spring (NORCD 1092, 2010)
- Diverse artister, Førdefestivalen (NORCD 1093, 2010)
- Daniel Herskedal, City Stories (NORCD 1094, 2010)
- Blixband), Pinseria (NORCD 1095, 2010)
- Winther-Storm (Håkon Storm, Thomas Winther Andersen, Mark Coehoorn and Natalio Sued), Patchwork (NORCD 1096, 2010)
- BMX (Njål Ølnes, Thomas T. Dahl and Øyvind Skarbø with Per Jørgensen), Bergen Open (NORCD 1097, 2010)
- Ingvild K. Amundsen and Lars Jakob Rudjord, Orvilsk! (NORCD 1098, 2010)
- Eple Trio, In the clearing / In the Cavern (NORCD 1099, 2010)
- Gabriel Fliflet, Åresong (NORCD 1102, 2011)
- Blink, Blink (NORCD 1103, 2011)
- Akkus, Akkus (NORCD 1104, 2011)
- Håkon Storm, Zinober (NORCD 1105, 2012)
- Stein Versto, Urjen, slåtter etter Olav Groven and Eivind Groven (NORCD 1106, 2012)
- Lindha Kallerdahl, Let's Dance (NORCD 1107, 2012)
- Stian Omenås, Klangkammer 1 (NORCD 1201, 2012)
- Per Arne Ferner and Per Gunnar Juliusson, Undertowed (NORCD 1208, 2012)
- Kosmonavt (Inge W. Breistein, Audun Reithaug, Brage Tørmænen and Aron Nørstebø), Vår bakgård (NORCD 1209, 2012)
- Andrea Kvintett, Andrea Kvintett (NORCD 1210, 2012)
- Hullyboo (Marius Hirth Klovning, Bjørnar Kaldefoss Tveite and Mats Mæland Jensen), Bønner og flesk (NORCD 1211, 2012)
- Dag-Filip Roaldsnes, Først (NORCD 1212, 2012)
- Hammer & Hersk (Arild Hammerø and Daniel Herskedal), Flåte (NORCD 1213, 2012)
- Eplemøya Songlag, Møya og myten (NORCD 1214, 2012)
- Summers: Silvola: Kvam, Mala Fama (NORCD 1215, 2012)
- Winther-Storm (Håkon Storm, Thomas Winther Andersen, Mark Coehoorn and Natalio Sued), Spinnaker (NORCD 1217, 2012)
- Cirrus, Méli Mélo, a Norwegian chamber jazz trio including Eva Bjerga Haugen, Inge W. Breistein & Theodore B. Onarheim (NORCD 1318, 2013)
- Gisle Torvik, Tranquil Fjord (NORCD 1320, 2013)
- Karl Seglem, NyeSongar.no (NORCD 1322, 2013)
- Duplex, Duolia (NORCD 1324, 2013)
- Duplex, Sketches of… (NORCD 1325, 2013)
- Daniel Herskedal, Dagane (NORCD 1326, 2013)
- Hanne Kalleberg's Papirfly, Papirfly (NORCD 1327, 2013)
- Andrea Kvintett, Russian Dream (NORCD 1328, 2013)
- Erik Halvorsen, Undergrunnane (NORCD 1431, 2014)
- Østerdalsmusikk, Østerdalsmusikk (NOR CD 1432, 2015)
- Baker Hansen, Chet på norsk / Ei som deg (NORCD 1436, 2014)
- Elin Rosseland, Vokal (NORCD 1437, 2014)
- Elin Rosseland, Vokal (NORCD 1438 LP, 2014)
- Andreas Haddeland, Tilhørighet (NORCD 1439, 2014)
- Kristoffer Eikrem & Kjetil Jerve, Feeling // Emotion (NORCD 1442, 2014)
- Kristoffer Eikrem & Kjetil Jerve, Feeling // Emotion (NORCD 1443 LP, 2014)
- Karl Seglem, Som Spor (NORCD 1445, 2014)
- Karl Seglem, Som Spor (NORCD 1446 LP, 2014)
- Parallax, Den tredje dagen (NORCD LP 1448, 2014)
- Holum trio, Heim (NORCD 1551, 2015)
- Karl Seglem & Christoph Stiefel Group, Waves (NORCD 1553, 2015)
- BenReddik, Gjemsel (NORCD 1554, 2015)
- Duplex (Harald Lassen & Christian Meaas Svendsen), Èn (NORCD 1556, 2015)
- Karl Seglem, Music From The Film «Struggle For Life» (NORCD 2000, 1998)
