= 2014 in jazz =

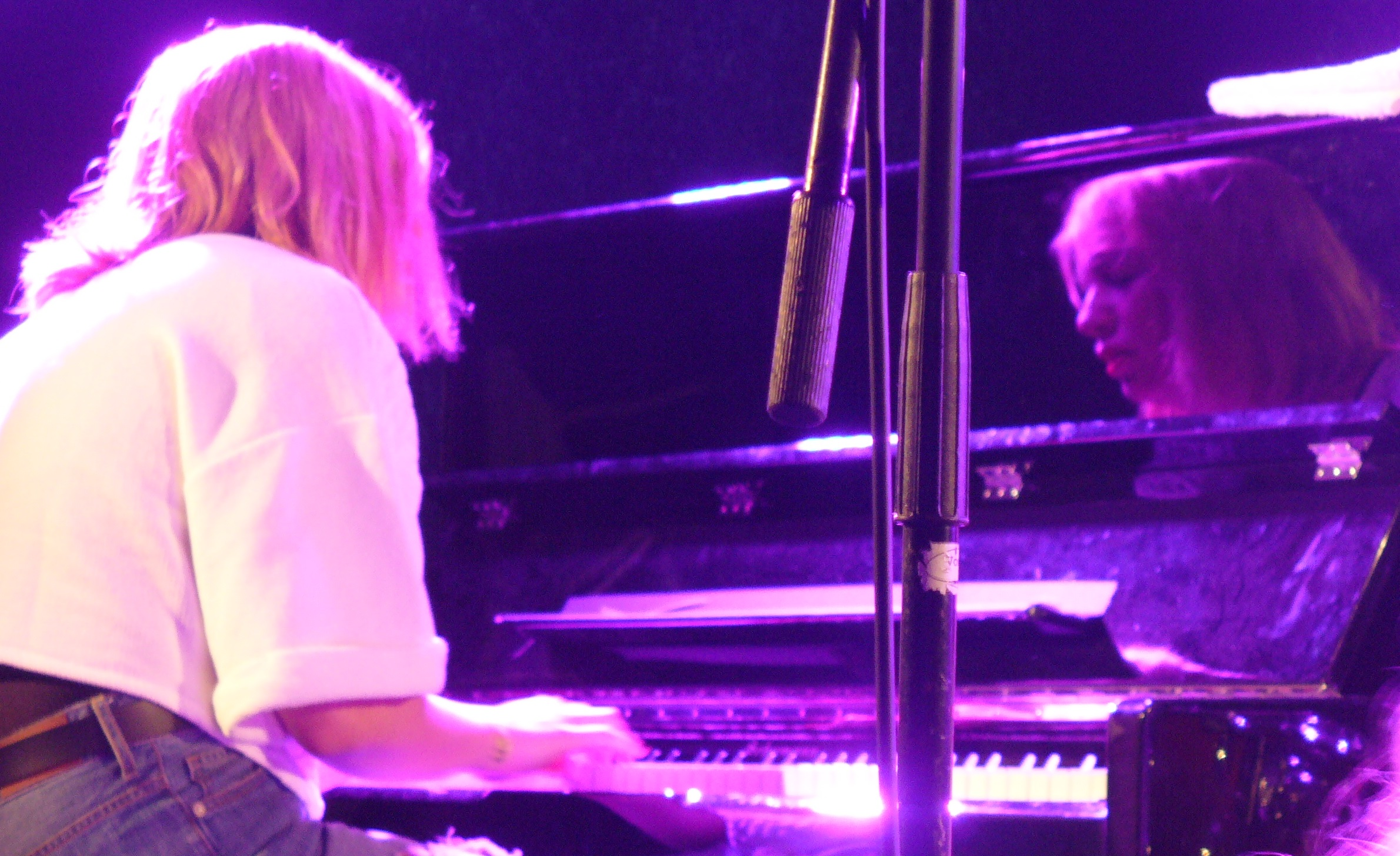
- Marte Eberson, Vossajazz 2014.
- Decade: 2010s in jazz
- Music: 2014 in music
- Standards: List of jazz standards
- See also: 2013 in jazz – 2015 in jazz

This is a timeline documenting events of Jazz in the year 2014.

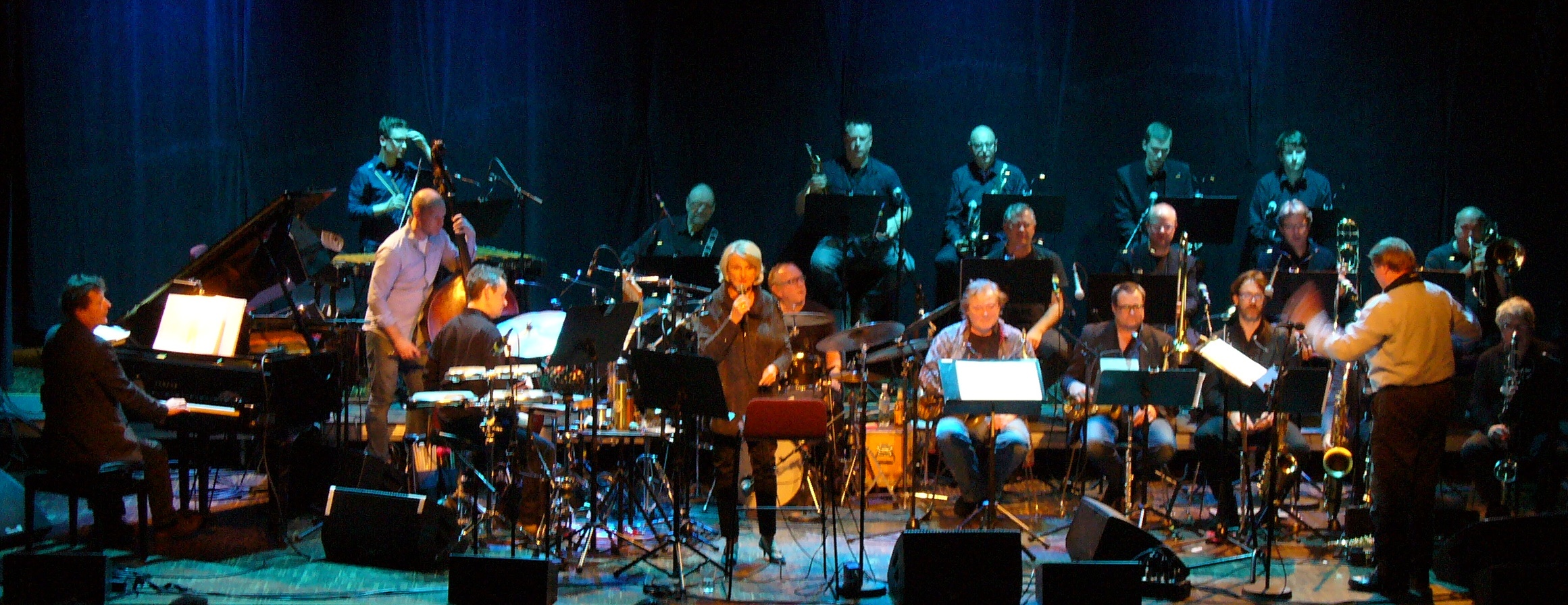
John Surman and Karin Krog with Bergen Big Band at USF Verftet, Bergen 2014.

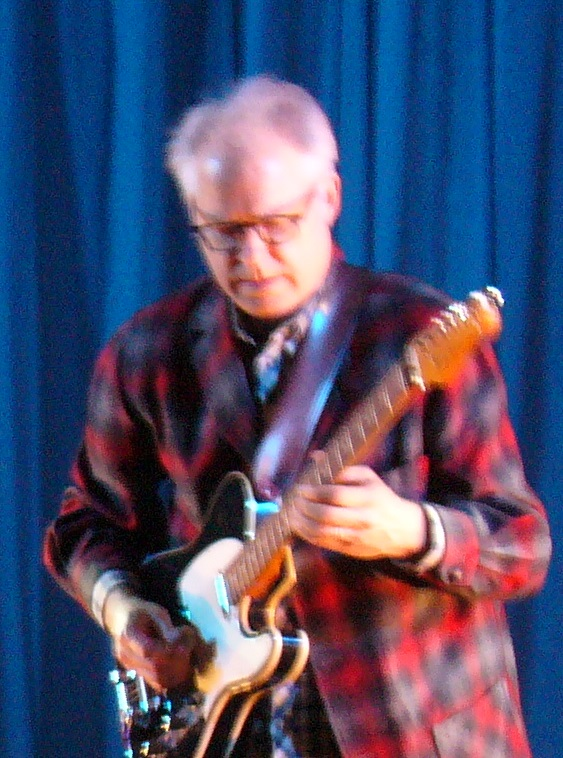
Bill Frisell at Vossajazz 2014.

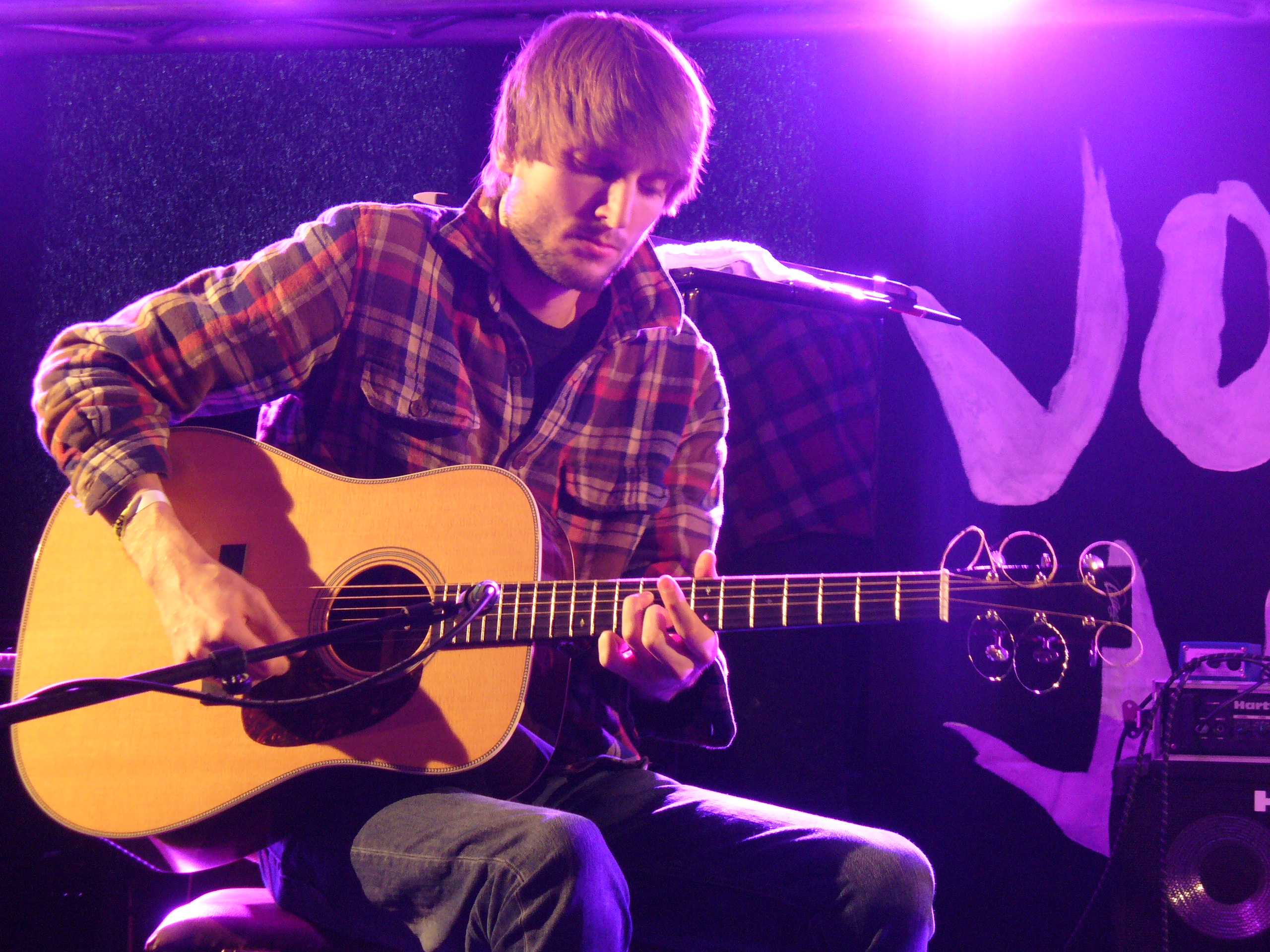
Christian Skår Winther at Vossajazz 2014.

== Events ==
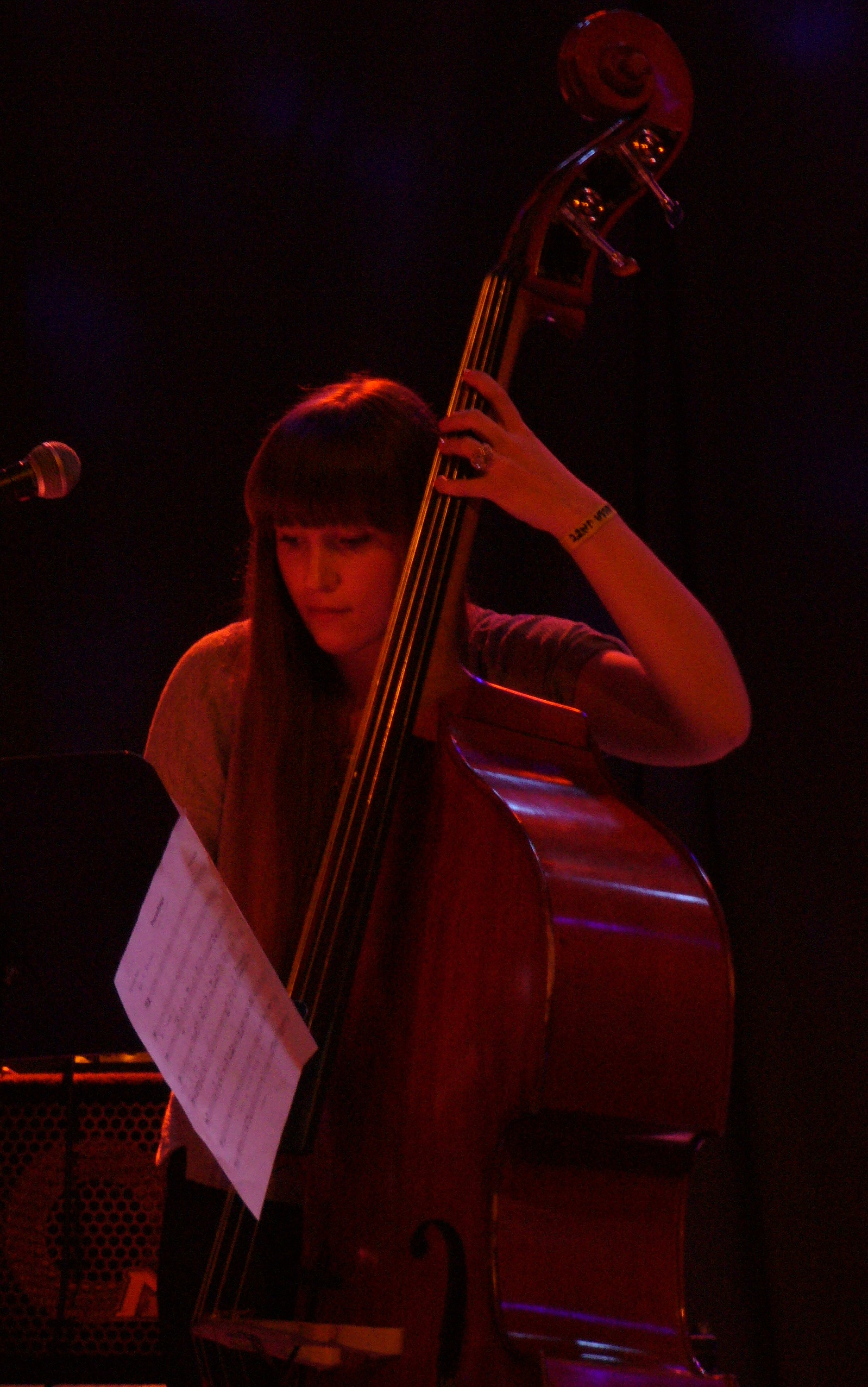
Ellen Andrea Wang at Vossajazz 2014.

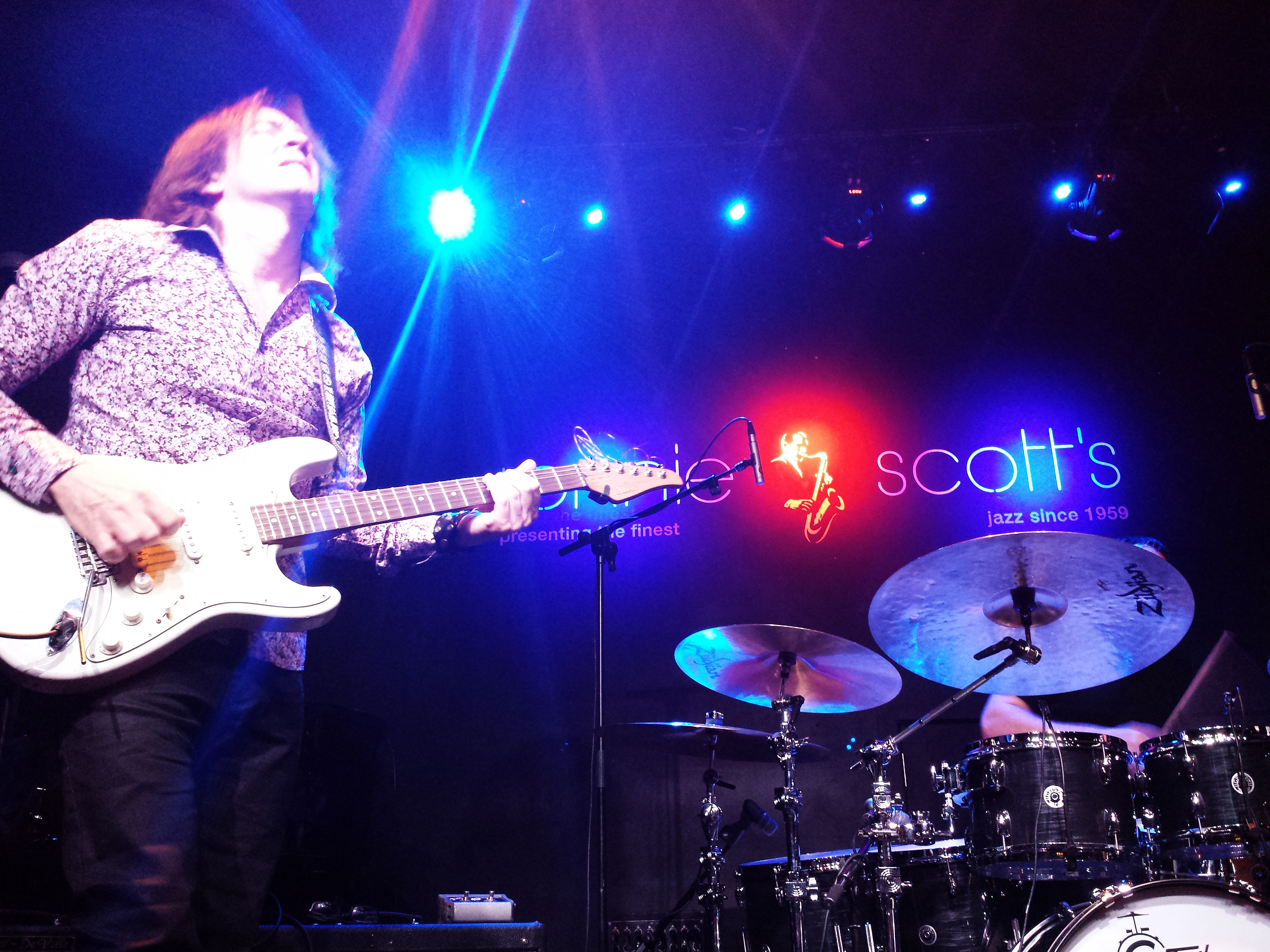
Wayne Krantz at Ronnie Scotts, London 2014.

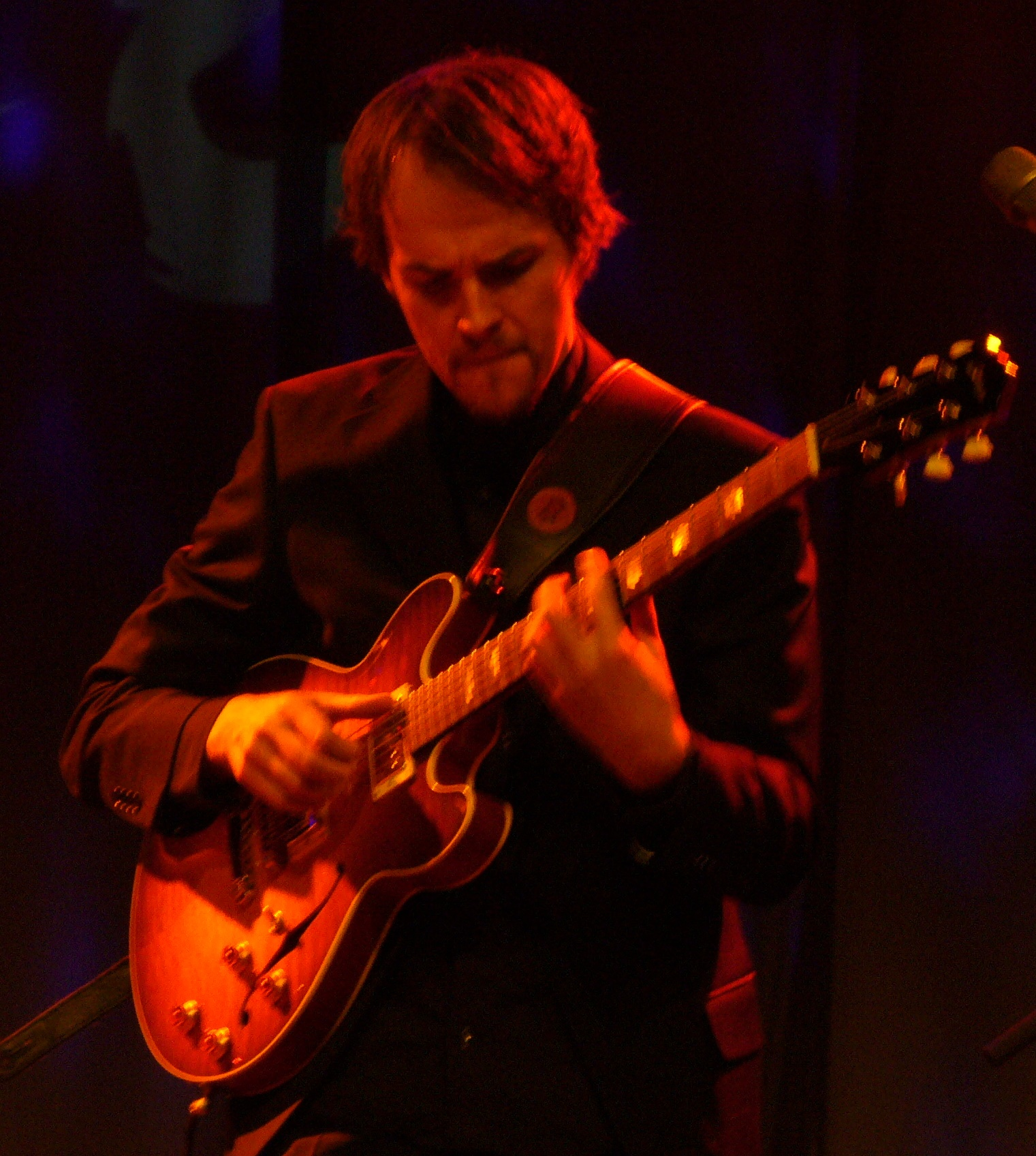
Gisle Torvik at Vossajazz 2014.

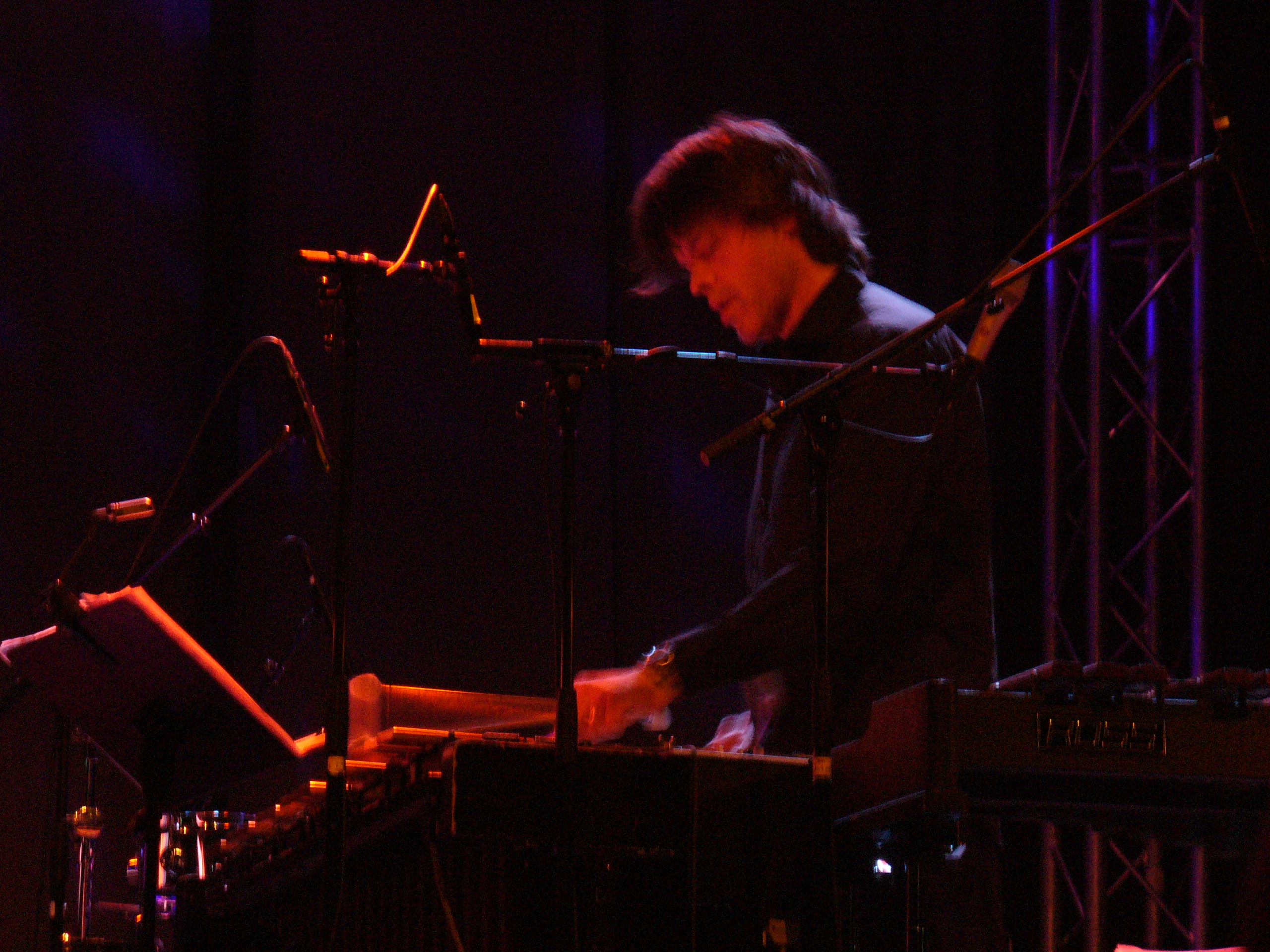
Ivar Kolve at Vossajazz 2014.

=== January ===
- A percussion focused jazz funk band called Ghost-Note is founded by two members of Snarky Puppy: Robert "Sput" Searight (drums) and Nate Werth (percussion)
- 16 – The 9th Ice Music Festival started in Geilo, Norway (January 16 – 19).
- 22 – The 3rd Bodø Jazz Open started in Bodø, Norway (January 22 – 26).

=== February ===
- 5 – The 16th Polarjazz Festival started in Longyearbyen, Svalbard (February 5 – 9).
- 28 – The 10th Jakarta International Java Jazz Festival started in Jakarta, Indonesia (February 28 – March 2).

=== April ===
- 11 – The 41st Vossajazz started in Voss, Norway (April 11 – 13).
- 12
  - Sigbjørn Apeland was awarded Vossajazzprisen 2014.
  - Mats Eilertsen performed the commissioned work Rubicon for Vossajazz 2014.
- 23 – The 20th SoddJazz started in Inderøy, Norway (April 23 – 27).
- 25 – The 3rd Torino Jazz Festival started in Turin (April 25 – May 1).
- 30 – The International Jazz Day.

=== May ===
- 22 – The 42nd Nattjazz started in Bergen, Norway (May 22 – 31)

=== June ===
- 26
  - The 34th Montreal International Jazz Festival started in Montreal, Quebec, Canada (June 26 – July 6).
  - The 26th Jazz Fest Wien started in Vienna, Austria (June 26 – July 11).

=== July ===
- 2 – The 50th Kongsberg Jazzfestival started at Kongsberg, Norway (July 2 – 5).
- 4
  - The 36th Copenhagen Jazz Festival started in Copenhagen, Denmark (July 4 – 14).
  - The 48th Montreux Jazz Festival started in Montreux, Switzerland (July 4 – 18).
- 5 – Mathias Eick was recipient of the Kongsberg Jazz Award or DNB.prisen 2014 at the Kongsberg Jazzfestival.
- 8 – The 67th Nice Jazz Festival started in Nice, France (July 8 – 12).
- 10 – The 14th Stavernfestivalen started in Stavern, Norway (July 10 – 12).
- 11 – The 39th North Sea Jazz Festival started in Rotterdam, Netherlands (July 11 – 13).
- 12
  - The 26th Aarhus Jazz Festival started in Aarhus, Denmark (July 12 – 19).
  - The 49th Pori Jazz Festival started in Pori, Finland (July 12 – 20).
- 14 – The 54th Moldejazz started in Molde, Norway with Sidsel Endresen as artist in residence (July 14 – 19).
- 15 – Monkey Plot was awarded the JazzIntro 2014 at Moldejazz.
- 22 – The 19th Canal Street started in Arendal, Norway (July 22 – 26).

=== August ===
- 3 – The 58th Newport Jazz Festival started in Newport, Rhode Island (August 3 – 5).
- 6 – The 28th Sildajazz started in Haugesund, Norway (August 6–10).
- 7 – The 30th Brecon Jazz Festival started in Brecon, Wales (August 7 – 9).
- 11 – The 29th Oslo Jazzfestival started in Oslo, Norway (August 11–16).
- 12 – Odd André Elveland was recipient of the Ella-prisen 2014 at the Oslo Jazzfestival.

=== September ===
- 4 – The 10th Punktfestivalen started in Kristiansand, Norway (September 4 – 6).
- 19 – The 57th Monterey Jazz Festival started in Monterey, California (September 19 – 21).

=== October ===
- 10 – The 31st Stockholm Jazz Festival started in Stockholm, Sweden (October 10 – 19).

=== November ===
- 14 – The 23rd London Jazz Festival started in London, England (November 14 – 23).

== Album released ==
=== January ===
Day	Album	Artist	Label	Notes	Ref.
6	Fly North	Jan Gunnar Hoff	Losen Records		
10	Chron	Arve Henriksen	Rune Grammofon		
17	Extended Circle	Tord Gustavsen Quartet	ECM Records	Produced by Manfred Eicher	
17	Medea	Eleni Karaindrou	ECM Records	Produced by Manfred Eicher	
27	Valencia	Hildegunn Øiseth	Losen Records		

=== February ===
Day	Album	Artist	Label	Notes	Ref.
3	Kin (←→)	Pat Metheny Unity Group	Nonesuch Records	Produced by Pat Metheny	
7	Acres Of Blue	Espen Berg	Atterklang	AKLANG308	
28	Mutations	Vijay Iyer	ECM Records	Produced by Manfred Eicher	

=== March ===
Day	Album	Artist	Label	Notes	Ref.
7	Behind The Sun	Motorpsycho with Reine Fiske	Rune Grammofon		
21	Piano Songs	Meredith Monk	ECM Records	Produced by Allison Sniffin, Meredith Monk	
28	Maelstrom	Stian Westerhus & Pale Horses	Rune Grammofon		
28	Play Blue (Oslo Concert)	Paul Bley	ECM Records	Produced by Manfred Eicher	

=== April ===
Day	Album	Artist	Label	Notes	Ref.
7	Chet På Norsk / Ei Som Deg	Baker Hansen	NorCD		
11	Enfant Terrible	Hedvig Mollestad Trio	Rune Grammofon		
25	Lion	Marius Neset	ACT Music		
25	El Valle De La Infancia	Dino Saluzzi Group	ECM Records	Produced by Manfred Eicher	

=== May ===
Day	Album	Artist	Label	Notes	Ref.
16	Forever Young	Jacob Young	ECM Records	Produced by Manfred Eicher	

=== June ===
Day	Album	Artist	Label	Notes	Ref.
24	Enjoy the View	Bobby Hutcherson, David Sanborn, Joey DeFrancesco feat. Billy Hart	Blue Note	Produced by Don Was	

=== August ===
Day	Album	Artist	Label	Notes	Ref.
15	Touchstone For Manu	Manu Katché feat. Jan Garbarek, Tomasz Stanko, Tore Brunborg, Nils Petter Molvær, Mathias Eick, Trygve Seim	ECM	Produced by Manfred Eicher	
22	The Nature Of Connections	Arve Henriksen	Rune Grammofon		
22	Mists: Charles Ives for Jazz Orchestra	Jack Cooper	Planet Arts Records	Produced by Luis Bonilla	

=== September ===
Day	Album	Artist	Label	Notes	Ref.
19	Som Spor	Karl Seglem	NorCD		
30	Up	The Stanley Clarke Band	Mack Avenue		

=== October ===
Day	Album	Artist	Label	Notes	Ref.
3	Universal Cycle	Eple Trio	Shipwreckords		
17	Innocent Play	Bjørn Alterhaug Quintet	Ponca Jazz Records		
17	Skogenes Sang	In the Country & Frida Ånnevik	Grappa Music		
24	Lumen Drones	Lumen Drones (Nils Økland, Per Steinar Lie, Ørjan Haaland)	ECM		
24	A Passion For John Donne	Ketil Bjørnstad	ECM Records		
24	World Of Glass	Terje Isungset & Arve Henriksen	All Ice Records		

=== November ===
Day	Album	Artist	Label	Notes	Ref.
1	Kryssande	Gisle Torvik and Hardanger Big Band	NorCD		
10	Trademark	Christer Fredriksen	Losen Records		
7	Bonita	Sidsel Endresen & Stian Westerhus	Rune Grammofon		
7	Night Owl	Albatrosh	Rune Grammofon		
11	Silk Moon	Renaud Garcia-Fons with Derya Türkan	e-motive Records		
21	Diving	Ellen Andrea Wang	Propeller Recordings		
24	Lumen Drones	Lumen Drones (Ørjan Haaland, Nils Økland, Per Steinar Lie)	ECM Records	Produced by Manfred Eicher	
28	Feeling // Emotion	Kristoffer Eikrem & Kjetil Jerve	NorCD		

=== December ===
Day	Album	Artist	Label	Notes	Ref.
5	Den Tredje Dagen	Parallax	NorCD		

=== Unknown date ===
#

M

- Switch by Nils Petter Molvær (Okhe).

== Deaths ==
=== January ===
- 1 – Sam Ulano, American drummer (born 1920).
- 9
  - Amiri Baraka, African-American writer and music critic (born 1934).
  - Roy Campbell Jr., American trumpeter (born 1952).
- 13 – Ronny Jordan, British guitarist (born 1962).
- 15 – Aage Teigen, Norwegian trombonist (born 1944).
- 18 – Billie Rogers, American trumpeter and singer (born 1917).
- 23 – Riz Ortolani, Italian film composer (born 1926).
- 25 – Arthur Doyle, American saxophonist, flutist, zanzithophonist, and vocalist (born 1924).
- 27 – Pete Seeger, American guitarist (born 1919).

=== February ===
- 11 – Alice Babs, Swedish singer and actress (born 1924).
- 24 – Franny Beecher, American guitarist (born 1921).
- 25 – Paco de Lucía, Spanish virtuoso flamenco guitarist, composer and producer (born 1947).

=== March ===
- 13 – Al Harewood, American drummer (born 1923).

=== April ===
- 1 – King Fleming, American pianist and bandleader (born 1922).
- 5
  - Alan Davie, Scottish tenor saxophonist and painter (born 1920).
  - Wayne Henderson, American soul jazz and hard bop trombonist and record producer (born 1939).
- 12 – Fred Ho, American baritone saxophonist, composer, and bandleader (born 1957).
- 14 – Armando Peraza, Cuban percussionist, Santana (born 1924).
- 23 – Benjamín Brea, Spanish-Venezuelan saxophonist, flautist, and oboist (born 1946).
- 24 – Konstantin Orbelyan, Armenian pianist, composer, and head of the State Estrada Orchestra of Armenia (born 1928).

=== May ===
- 4 – Earl Gill, Irish trumpeter and bandleader (born 1932).
- 8 – Jair Rodrigues, Brazilian musician and singer (born 1939).
- 9
  - Frank Strazzeri, American pianist (born 1930).
  - Joe Wilder, American trumpeter, bandleader, and composer (born 1922).
- 25
  - Edmund Percey, English architect and pianist (born 1929).
  - Herb Jeffries, American singer and actor (born 1913).

=== June ===
- 5 – Aaron Sachs, American saxophonist and clarinetist (born 1923).
- 12 – Jimmy Scott, American vocalist (born 1925).
- 18 – Horace Silver, American pianist (born 1928).
- 29 – Paul Horn, American jazz flautist and saxophonist (born 1930).

=== July ===
- 5 – Kathy Stobart, English saxophonist (born 1925).
- 7 – Frankie Dunlop, American jazz drummer (born 1928).
- 11 – Charlie Haden, American upright-bassist (born 1937).
- 19 – Lionel Ferbos, American trumpeter (born 1911).
- 29
  - Giorgio Gaslini, Italian pianist, composer, and conductor (born 1929).
  - Idris Muhammad, American drummer (born 1939).

=== August ===
- 3 – Kenny Drew Jr., American pianist (born 1958).
- 15 – John Blake Jr., American violinist (born 1947).
- 22 – John Ore, American bassist (born 1933).
- 24 – Fred Sturm, American composer, arranger, and teacher (born 1951).
- 27 – Roy Crimmins, English trombonist, composer, and arranger (born 1929).
- 28 – Alan Lawrence Turnbull, Australian drummer (born 1943).

=== September ===
- 8 – Gerald Wilson, American trumpeter (born 1918).
- 12 – Joe Sample, American pianist (born 1939).
- 15 – Jackie Cain, American singer (born 1928).
- 18 – Kenny Wheeler, Canadian composer, trumpeter, and flugelhorn player (born 1930).
- 28 – Petr Skoumal, Czech pianist and composer (born 1938).
- 30 – Sheila Tracy, British broadcaster, writer, trombonist, and singer (born 1934).

=== October ===
- 10 – Olav Dale, Norwegian saxophonist, composer and orchestra leader (born 1958).
- 11
  - Brian Lemon, British pianist (born 1937).
  - Mats Rondin, Swedish cellist and conductor (born 1960).
- 16 – Tim Hauser, American singer (born 1941).
- 24 – Vic Ash, English saxophonist and clarinetist (born 1930).
- 25 – Jack Bruce, Scottish bassist, composer and orchestra leader (born 1943).
- 31 – Renato Sellani, Italian pianist and composer (born 1926).

=== November ===
- 2 – Acker Bilk, English clarinettist and vocalist (born 1929).
- 12 – Carlos Emilio Morales, Cuban guitarist (born 1939).
- 20 – Joe Bonner, American pianist (born 1948).

=== December ===
- 2 – Chris White, American upright bassist (born 1936).
- 20 – Ronnie Bedford, American drummer and professor (born 1931).
- 24 – Buddy DeFranco, American clarinetist (born 1923).
- 26 – Al Belletto, American saxophonist and clarinetist (born 1928).
- 30 – Jim Galloway, Scottish-Canadian clarinetist and saxophonist (born 1936).

== See also ==
- List of 2014 albums
- List of years in jazz
- 2010s in jazz
- 2014 in music
