= Lindha Kallerdahl =

Swedish jazz singer

- Born: Lindha Svantesson; 27 September 1972 (age 53); Sweden
- Genres: Jazz
- Occupations: Singer, musician, composer
- Instrument: Singer-songwriter
- Labels: Hoob, NorCD
- Website: www.lindhakallerdahl.com

Lindha Kallerdahl (born Lindha Svantesson 27 September 1972) is a Swedish Jazz singer, married to the pianist and composer Fabian Kallerdahl.

== Honors ==
- 2001: Jazz in Sweden Award
- 2003: Sten A Olssons Cultural Scholarship
- 2015: Hedersgäst vid Umeå Jazzfestival

== Discography ==
As Lindha Svantesson

- 1999: Röd (AMiGO)
- 2001: Far From Alone (Caprice Records)
- 2003: 9 Swans Repeat (Naxos)

As Lindha Kallerdahl

- 2007: Gold (ESP Disk)
- 2009: Skoddeheimen (NorCD), Kallerdahl / Seglem / Ulvo / Hole / Sjøvaag
- 2012: Let’s Dance (Hoob Records)
- 2014: Gold Quintet Solo (Hoob Jazz)
