= Flate =

Flate may refer to:

== People ==
- Lisa A. Callif (born 1974, as Lisa Anne Flate), U.S. entertainment lawyer
- Sander Flåte, Norwegian soccer player; see List of Norwegian football transfers summer 2019

=== Characters ===
- Ian Flate, a fictional character from A Scare at Bedtime; see List of A Scare at Bedtime episodes

== Music ==
- Flaté musical instrument
- Flåte (album), a 2012 record by Hammer & Hersk; see NorCD albums discography

== Other uses ==
- Deflate (also called Flate), a lossless compression format created for PKZIP

== See also ==
- Flat (disambiguation)
- Deflation (disambiguation)
- Inflation (disambiguation)
