= Jonas Howden Sjøvaag =

Norwegian jazz drummer (born 1978)

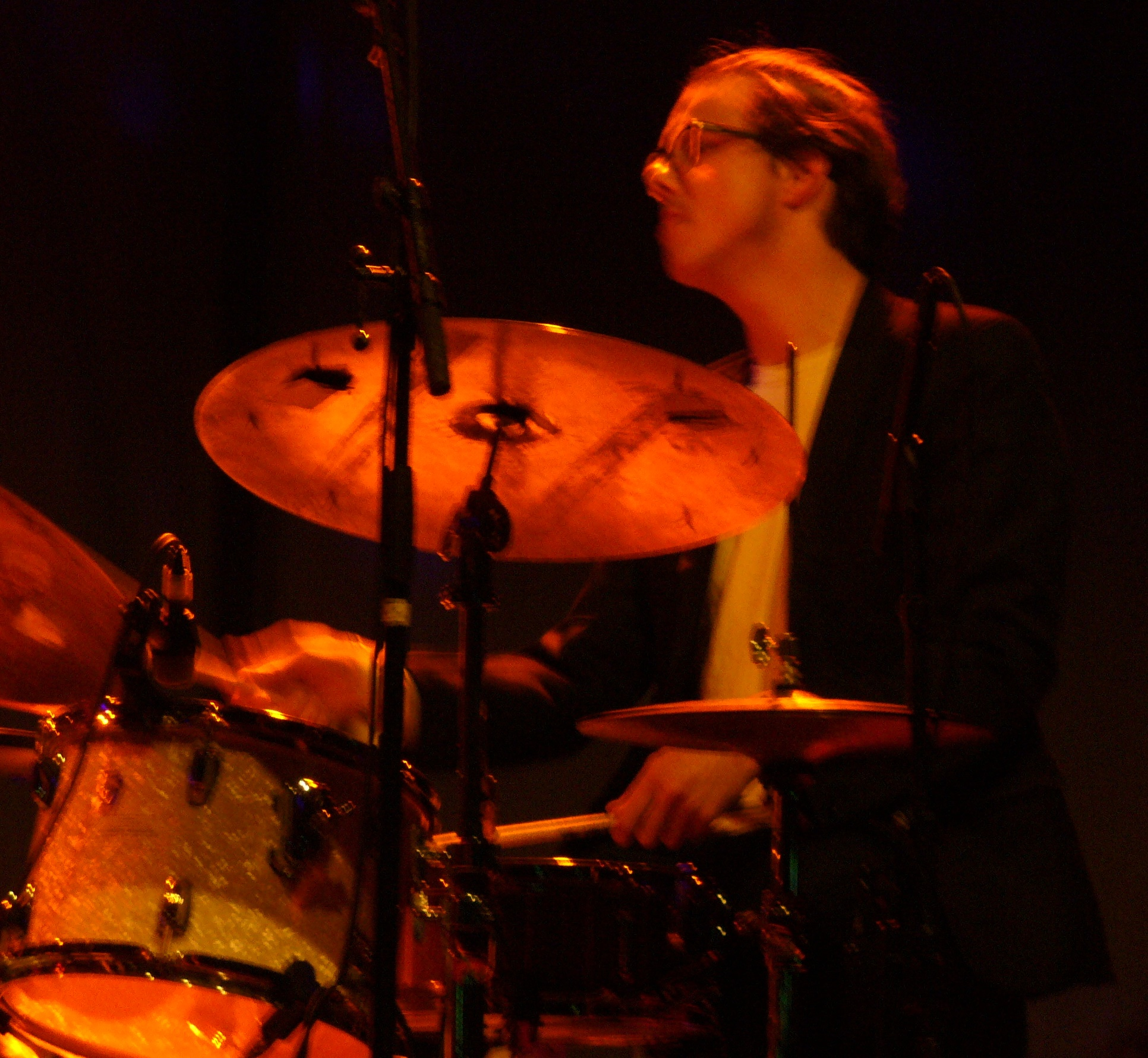
- Sjøvaag at Vossajazz 2014.

Background information
- Born: 3 November 1978 (age 47); Munich, Germany
- Origin: Norway
- Genres: Jazz
- Occupations: Musician, composer
- Instrument: Drums
- Member of: Eple Trio
- Website: www.jonassjovaag.no

Jonas Howden Sjøvaag (born 3 November 1978 in Munich, Germany) is a Norwegian jazz drummer.

== Biography ==
Sjøvaag started playing piano at an early age. He had his solo debut with Vestfold Youth Symphony Orchestra at age 11, started playing drums at age 10, and switched main focus to jazz drums at age 17. He graduated at the Norwegian Academy of Music with a Master's degree in improvised music in 2008. From 2003 he has been regular drummer of the Eple Trio.

== Discography (in selection) ==
=== Solo albums ===
- 2001: Navyelectre 1 (Shipwreckords)
- 2008: Navyelectre The Mourning (Shipwreckords)
- 2015: Navyelectre Large Ensemble (Shipwreckords)

=== Collaborations ===
Eple Trio

- 2007: Made this (NorCD)
- 2008: The Widening Sphere Of Influence (NorCD)
- 2010:In The Clearing / In The Cavern (double album) (NorCD)
- 2014: Universal Cycle (Shipwreckords)

Kallerdahl / Seglem / Ulvo / Hole / Sjøvaag

- 2009: Skoddeheimen (NorCD)

Karl Seglem

- 2007: NorskJazz.no (Ozella Records)
- 2013: NyeSongar.no (Ozella Records)
- 2017: Nordic Balm (Ozella Records)
