= Kim-Erik Pedersen =

Norwegian artist and jazz saxophonist

- Born: 26 April 1987 (age 38); Hamar, Hedmark
- Origin: Norway
- Genres: Jazz
- Occupations: Musician and composer
- Instrument: Saxophone

Kim-Erik Pedersen (born 26 April 1987) is a Norwegian artist and jazz musician (saxophone), known from bands like Jon Eberson / Kim-Erik Pedersen Quartet, Eberson Funk Ensemble, Andrea Rydin Berge Quintet and Anja Eline Skybakmoen.

== Career ==
Pederson was born in Hamar. His versatility resulted in his collaborating with various jazz bands, at clubs and as a soloist with the Symphony Orchestra of Music at the Norwegian Academy of Music in Oslo where he studied music. He has also performed in several Norwegian bands on the European jazz scene.

Kim-Erik Pedersen Quartet with Lars Andreas Aspesæter (piano), Lars Egil Reine Hammersbøen (upright bass) and Tore Sandbakken (drums). Off Topic from 2007, a trio with Sebastian Haugen (bass) and Tore Sandbakken. The trio Pedersen/Myhr/Baar including Adrian Myhr (upright bass) and Jon Audun Baar (drums).

== Discography ==
Trio including Kim Johannesen and Chris Corsano

- 2011: Door To Door (FMR Records)

Machina trio including with Kristoffer Lo and Trond Bersu

- 2011: So Much For Dancing (Øra Fonogram)

Bleak House trio including with Dag-Filip Roaldsnes and Tore T. Sandbakken

- 2012: Dark Poetry (Creative Sources)
