= Håkon Storm-Mathisen =

Håkon Storm
- Born: Håkon Storm-Mathisen; 13 March 1967 (age 59); Oslo, Norway
- Genres: Jazz
- Occupations: Musician, composer, guitarist
- Instrument: Guitar
- Label: NorCD
- Website: Official website

Håkon Storm (born Håkon Storm-Mathisen 13 March 1967 in Oslo, Norway) is a Norwegian jazz musician (guitar), the son of professor of medicine Jon Storm-Mathisen (b. 1941), and known from his own band projects in addition playing within the "Prime Time Orchestra", and collaborations with Tore Brunborg, Finn Guttormsen, Jarle Vespestad, Jacob Young and Beate S. Lech.

== Career ==
When graduating from the Music program at Foss videregående skole, Storm-Mathisen attended the band Mathisfantene in Oslo 1987, before he moved to Copenhagen for his formal education at the Rhythmic Conservatory, where he was supervised by Ole Kock-Hansen (The Danish Radio Jazz orchestra), Butch Lacy, Bob Rockwell, Atilla Engin, Ed Thigpen, Jørgen Emborg, Staffan William-Olsson, and others. In 1992 he was back in Oslo and played on the city clubs with drummer Anders Engen and bassist Carl Morten Iversen. He hosted the jams at "Oslo Jazzhus" in 1993, often with Tom Olstad (drums) and Thomas Winther Andersen or Kåre Garnes (bass). From 1999 he was with trumpeter Torgrim Sollid in the lineup for the album Line Up led by the now Holland-based bass player Thomas Winther Andersen. He was also musical director for Prime Time Orchestra (established 1981) who performed several of his compositions. Also Bergen Big Band had his compositions on the repertoire in the 2001 season. He was musical teacher at Norges Musikkhøgskole when in 2002 he received NKR 25 000,- in grants from the Japanese "Sasakawa fund", which was dued to play with Japanese musicians and teach there. Several tours to Japan followed in 2003, 2008, 2009 and 2012. He also performed in guitarduo with Jacob Young (2001– ), and they toured in Serbia in 2003.

Storm-Mathisen also led his own H. S.-M. Quartet including Tore Brunborg (saxophone), Finn Guttormsen (bass) and Jarle Vespestad (drums), known from Farmers Market who took a play break. With Beate S. Lech and said Brunborg he also led a trio. The solo debut Canned Second (2004), with his own compositions was secure. The successor as a solo artist Zinober (2012), with the album Matsukaze (2006) with "The Livin' Jazz Orchestra" in between, was a success. In recent years he has been in the band Winther-Storm together with bassist Thomas Winther Andersen, the Argentine saxophonist Natalio Sued and Dutch drummer Mark Coehoorn, with album releases Patchwork (2010) and Spinnaker (2012).

== Discography ==
=== Solo albums ===
- 2001: Storm-bird, in Washington D.C., with Jimmy Halperin, Thomas Winter Andersen and Steve Altenberg
- 2004: Canned Second (Curling Legs), with Nils Jansen, Finn Guttormsen and Jarle Vespestad, with his own compositions for the most
- 2006: Matsukaze (Aim Records), within The Livin' Jazz Orchestra, performing the compositions "Ourobouros" and "Matsukaze", with 15 movements altogether
- 2012: Zinober (NorCD), solo with his own compositions
- 2014: Fosfor (NorCD)
- 2016: Volta Trio (NorCD)

=== Collaborative works ===
Within "Line up»

- 1995: Line up (NorCD)
- 2001: Out From A Cool Storage (NorCD)

Within "Winther-Storm»

- 2010: Patchwork (NorCD)
- 2012: Spinnaker (NorCD)
