= Svein Magnus Furu =

Norwegian jazz saxophonist, composer and journalist

- Born: 10 November 1983 (age 42); Asker, Akershus
- Origin: Norway
- Genres: Jazz
- Occupations: Musician, composer, music journalist
- Years active: Saxophone
- Labels: AIM Sound City; Park Grammofon
- Website: www.sveinmagnusfuru.com

Svein Magnus Furu (born 10 November 1983) is a Norwegian Jazz musician (saxophone) composer and music journalist, known from several bands and album releases.

== Career ==
Furu was born in Asker and is a graduate of the Norwegian Academy of Music in Oslo, where he studied under musicians like Fredrik Ljungkvist, Morten Halle and Ivar Grydeland. He has collaborated on venues all over Europe and USA, within a series of bands like Aphrodisiac, Speakeasy, Stian Around a Hill Quartet, Andrea Kvartett, Trabant and Diplodokus. He has also played on the biggest Norwegian jazz festivals, such as Oslo Jazzfestival, Kongsberg Jazzfestival, Nattjazz and MaiJazz, in addition to the 'Turku Jazz Festival' in Finland. He was nominated for Spellemannprisen 2009 in the class Jazz, together with Kim Johannesen and Tore Sandbakken for the album Kayak. He has participated in JazzIntro competition 'Young jazz musicians of the year', with three bands, and the 'Young Nordic Jazz Comets' within the band Speakeasy in 2010.

Furu is also a music journalist and critic for the renowned Norwegian newspaper Morgenbladet and Norwegian Broadcasting NRK.

== Discography ==
=== Solo albums ===
- 2009: The Eco Logic (Creative Sources Recordings), duo with guitarist Kim Johannesen
- 2009: Kayak (AIM Sound City), trio including Kim Johannesen and Tore Sandbakken

=== Collaborations ===
With Stian Around a Hill Quartet

- 2009: Lille Stille (AIM Sound City)
- 2011: Alle Skal Få (Atterklang)

With Aphrodisiac

- 2010: Yearning (Park Grammofon)

With Andrea Kvartett

- 2012: Andrea Kvintett (NorCD)
- 2013: Russian Dream (EP) (NorCD)

With Schow Trio including John Vegard Schow (piano), Sebastian Haugen-Markussen (bass) and Ole-Andreas Olafsrud (drums)

- 2013: Blått Hjerte (Pilar Records)
