= Andreas Ulvo =

Norwegian jazz keyboardist and composer

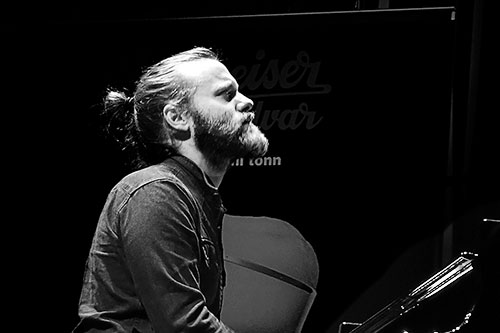
- Ulvo at the Reykjavik Jazz Festival in 2015.

Background information
- Born: Andreas Ulvo Langnes; 22 July 1983 (age 42); Kongsvinger, Norway
- Origin: Norwegian
- Genres: Jazz
- Occupations: Musician, composer
- Instruments: Piano, organ, keyboards
- Member of: Eple Trio
- Website: www.ulvo.no

Andreas Ulvo (born 22 July 1983 in Kongsvinger, Norway) is a Norwegian jazz pianist, organist, keyboardist and composer, known from cooperations with Shining, Ingrid Olava, Mathias Eick Quartet, Solveig Slettahjell & Slow Motion Orchestra, Karl Seglem and Thom Hell.

== Career ==
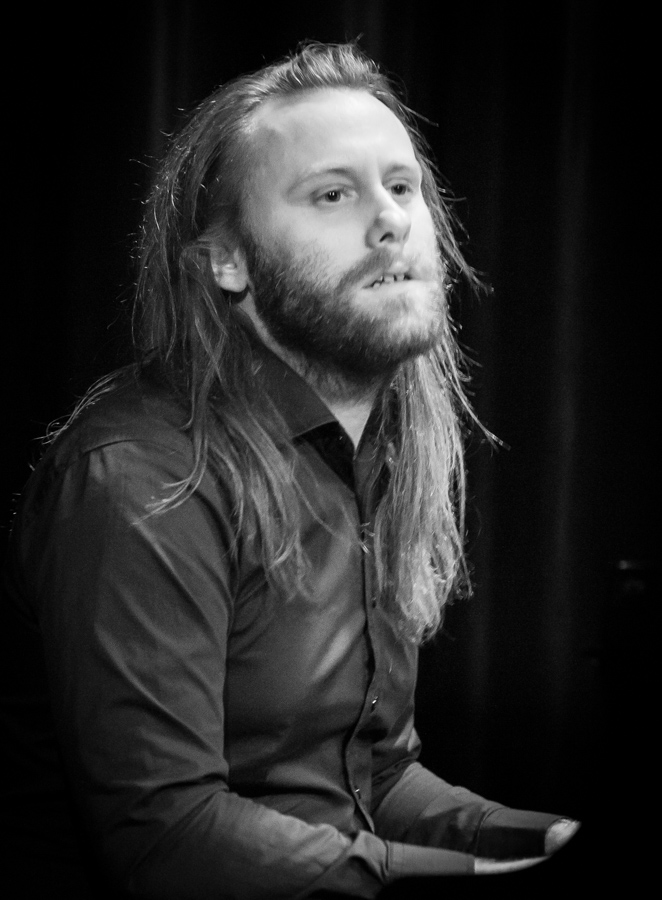
Ulvo at Victoria during the 2016 Oslo Jazzfestival.

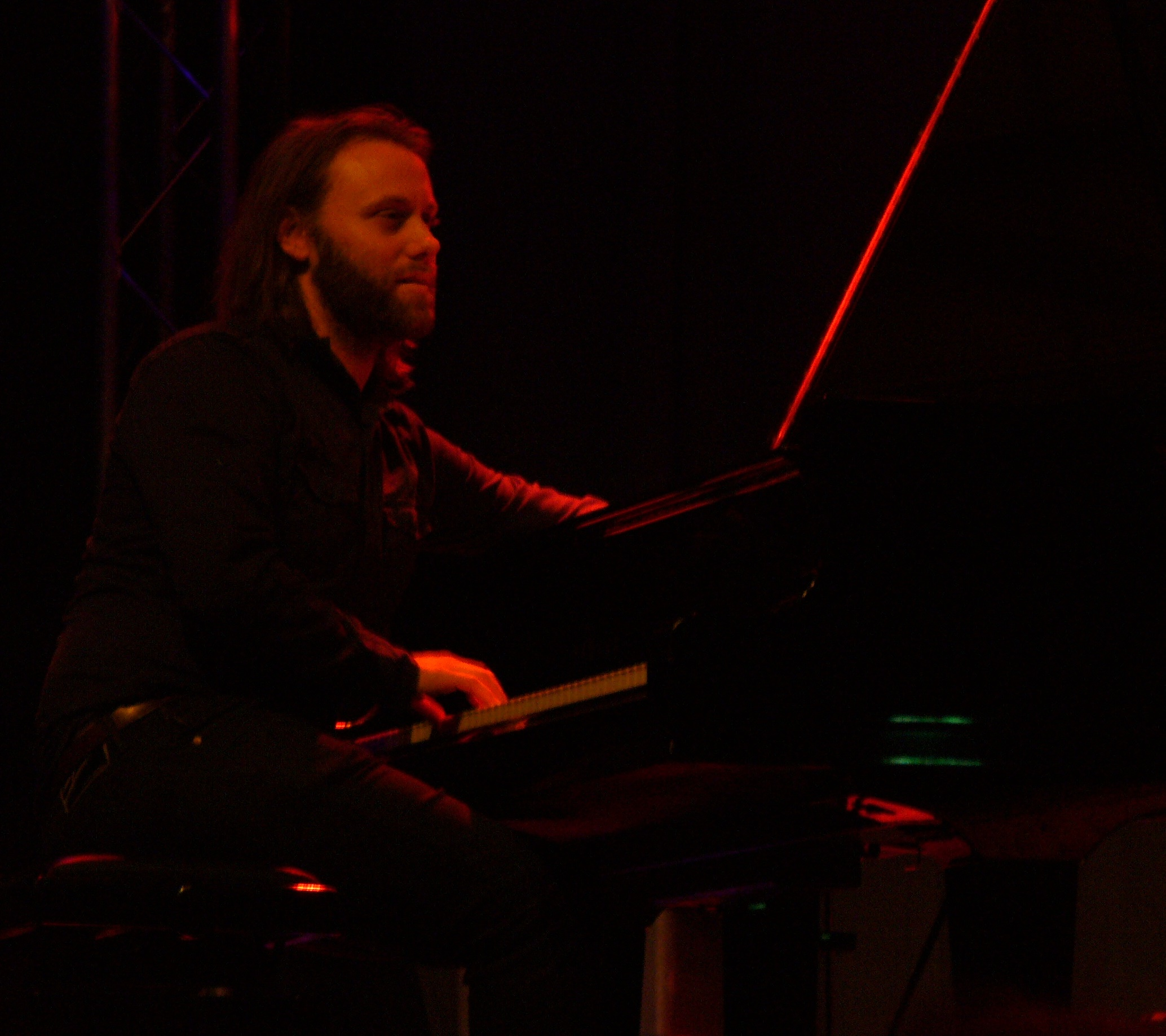
Ulvo at Vossajazz 12 April 2014.

Ulvo holds a master's degree in Jazz and Improvisation from Norwegian Academy of Music in Oslo. He has with his own projects Eple Trio, a Norwegian contemporary jazz trio playing their own original music, been on tour in Japan 2010, playing gigs in Tokyo, Chiba, Kobe, Kanazawa, Yokohama and Saitama. In addition he has "Ulvo Ensemble", and have worked with bands and artists like Shining, Mathias Eick Quartet, Solveig Slettahjell & Slow Motion Orchestra, "Frøy Aagre Offbeat", Karl Seglem and Thom Hell to mention some.

At Vossajazz 2014, he joined Gisle Torvik presenting his "fjord-jazz" together with Karl Seglem and Epletrio, including Sigurd Hole and Jonas Howden Sjøvaag.

== Photography ==
Ulvo is also a self-taught photographer, specializing in band and artist photography. He works with different types of photographic media, such as digital, polaroid, toy cameras, medium format and large format cameras.

== Discography ==
=== Solo albums ===
- 2011: Light & loneliness (AIM SoundCity)
- 2016: Unchangeable Seasons (Soundcanbeseen)

=== As leader ===
With Eple Trio

- 2007: Made This (NorCD)
- 2008: The widening sphere of influence (NorCD)
- 2009: Norsk jazz no (NorCD), with Karl Seglem
- 2010: In the clearing/In the cavern (NorCD)
- 2014: Universal Cycle (Shipwreckords)

With "Ulvo Ensemble"

- 2008: The Sound of rain needs no translation (AIM Records)

With "Andreas Ulvo + Slagr"

- 2012: Softspeaker (Atterklang)

With Ulvo / Hole / Haltli

- 2016: StaiStua (NorCD)

=== As sideman ===
With Frøy Aagre

- 2004: Katalyze (AIM Records), with "Frøy Aagre Offbeat"
- 2007: Countryside (AIM Records), with "Frøy Aagre Offbeat"
- 2010: Cycle of silence (ACT Music), with "Frøy Aagre Offbeat"
- 2013: Frøy Aagre Electric (Momentum Records), with "Frøy Aagre Electric" including Jonas Barsten

With Solveig Slettahjell & Slow Motion Orchestra

- 2009: Tarpan Seasons (Universal Music)

With Seglem/Kallerdahl/Ulvo/Hole/Sjøvaag

- 2009: Skoddeheimen (NorCD)
- 2015: Live in Germany (NorCD)

With "T8"

- 2010: Big shit (Schmell Records)

With Mathias Eick

- 2011: Skala (ECM Records)
- 2013: I Concentrate on You (Grappa Music), feat. Elvira Nikolaisen
- 2018: Ravensburg (ECM Records)

With Ellen Andrea Wang

- 2014: Diving (Propeller)

With Lena Nymark

- 2014: Beautiful Silence (Grappa Music)
