= James Halperin =

James Halperin may refer to:

- James L. Halperin, American businessman
- Jimmy Halperin, American jazz musician
