= Eple Trio =

Norwegian jazz trio

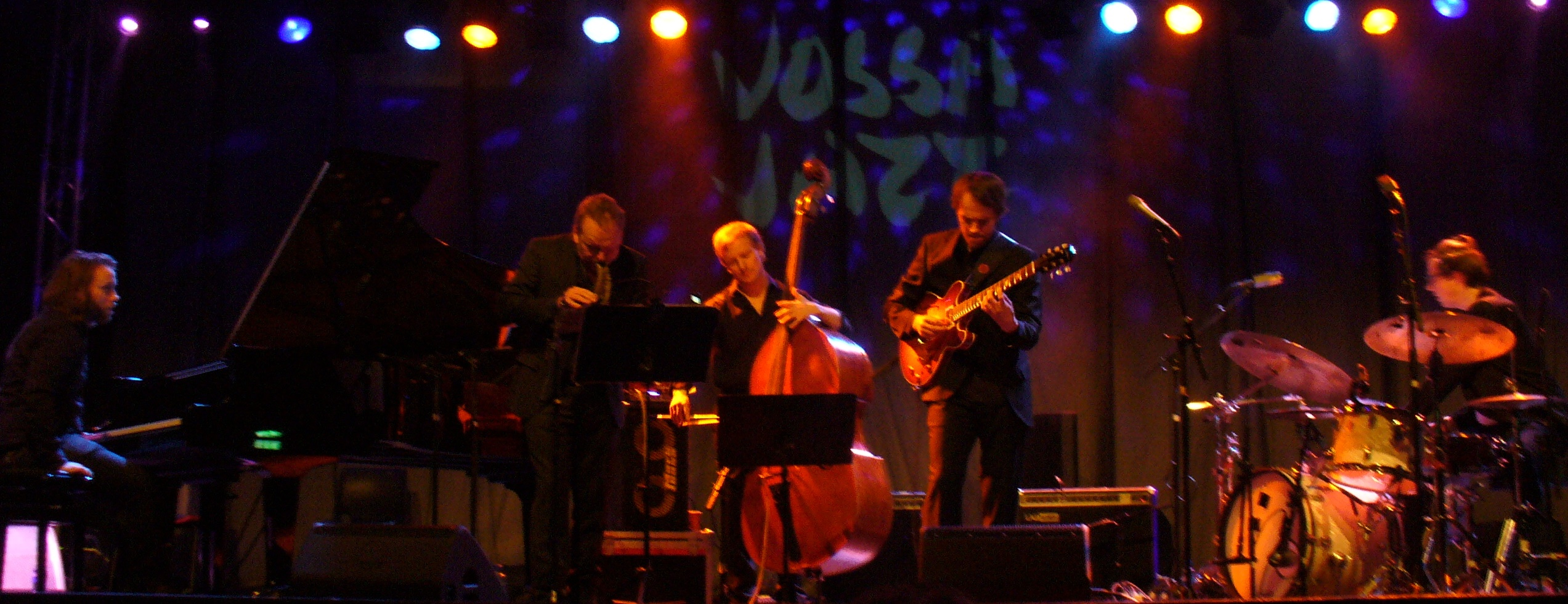
- Eple trio with Gisle Torvik at Vossajazz 2014.

Background information
- Origin: Oslo, Norway
- Genres: Jazz
- Years active: 2004–present
- Labels: NorCD; Shipwreckords
- Members: Andreas Ulvo; Sigurd Hole; Jonas Howden Sjøvaag
- Website: www.epletrio.no

Eple Trio (initiated 2004 at Norwegian Academy of Music in Oslo) is a Norwegian jazz trio including graduate students from the Norwegian Academy of Music (2008).

== Biography ==
The trio has since its inception in 2004 produced four critically acclaimed albums, all of which have set the tone when it comes to the modern piano trio genre and expression. Through extensive touring in Europe and Asia, and faced with other musical traditions, the ensemble has during the 10-years developed a strong interaction, an interaction where collective schemes and a dynamic improvisation form blurs the traditional boundaries between composed and improvised music, and between the roles of soloist and accompaniment.

The band comprises Andreas Ulvo (piano), Sigurd Hole (upright bass) and Jonas Howden Sjøvaag (drums), and they play modern jazz with elements of barock music and Scandinavian traditional music. The band members also collaborates with a number of other Norwegian musicians, including Karl Seglem, Jon Eberson and Mathias Eick. They released the album Universal Cycle during their 10th anniversary at Victoria, the Norwegian national jazz scene, in 2014. Eple Trio's members are all sought-after sidemen on the Norwegian music scene, having collaborated with some of Norway's finest jazz performers such as Karl Seglem, Mathias Eick and Jon Eberson.

== Discography ==
- 2007: Made this (NorCD)
- 2008: The Widening Sphere Of Influence (NorCD)
- 2010:In The Clearing / In The Cavern (double album) (NorCD)
- 2014: Universal Cycle (Shipwreckords)
- 2017: 5 (Shipwreckords)
