= Kim Johannesen (musician) =

- Born: 22 August 1985 (age 40); Bærum, Akershus
- Origin: Norway
- Genres: Jazz
- Occupations: Musician, composer
- Instrument: Guitar
- Label: Park Grammofon
- Website: kimjohannesen.com

Kim Johannesen (born 22 August 1985 in Bærum, Norway) is a Norwegian Jazz musician (guitar) and improviser living in Oslo.

== Career ==
Johannesen has studied jazz performance at the Norwegian Academy of Music in Oslo where he is currently (2013) studying for a Master's degree in improvisation. He has been performing on venues in Oslo with various groups regularly since 2005, and has toured clubs and festivals in Europe with Petter Wettre Quartet, Revolver!, Speakeasy, Wettre/Vinaccia/Johannesen and Golden Dawn. In addition he has collaborated with the likes of John Butcher, Axel Dörner, Raymond Strid, Ingebrigt Håker Flaten, Chris Corsano, Roger Turner, Pat Thomas, Joe Williamson, Frode Gjerstad, Per Zanussi, Klaus Holm, Tatsuya Nakatani and Joel Grip.

Johannesen collaborates closely with Svein Magnus Furu and also composes music on the albums The Eco Logic (2009), Speakeasy including with Tore Sandbakken in the album Kayak (2009), Barrage, Golden Dawn, Revolver! and Jeremy Rose Chiba with the album Blue Then White (2009). He also performs regularly in ensembles led by Petter Wettre.

== Discography ==
Within Speakeasy including Tore Sandbakken and Svein Magnus Furu

- 2009: Kayak (AIM Sound City)

With Svein Magnus Furu

- 2009: The Eco Logic (Creative Sources)

With Jeremy Rose Chiba

- 2009: Blue Then White, (Earshift Records)

With Kim-Erik Pedersen and Chris Corsano

- 2011: Door To Door (FMR Records)

Within Akode including Alan Wilkinson, Ola Høyer and Dag Erik Knedal Andersen

- 2012: Sa(n)dnes(s) (Gaffer Records)
