= Gisle Torvik =

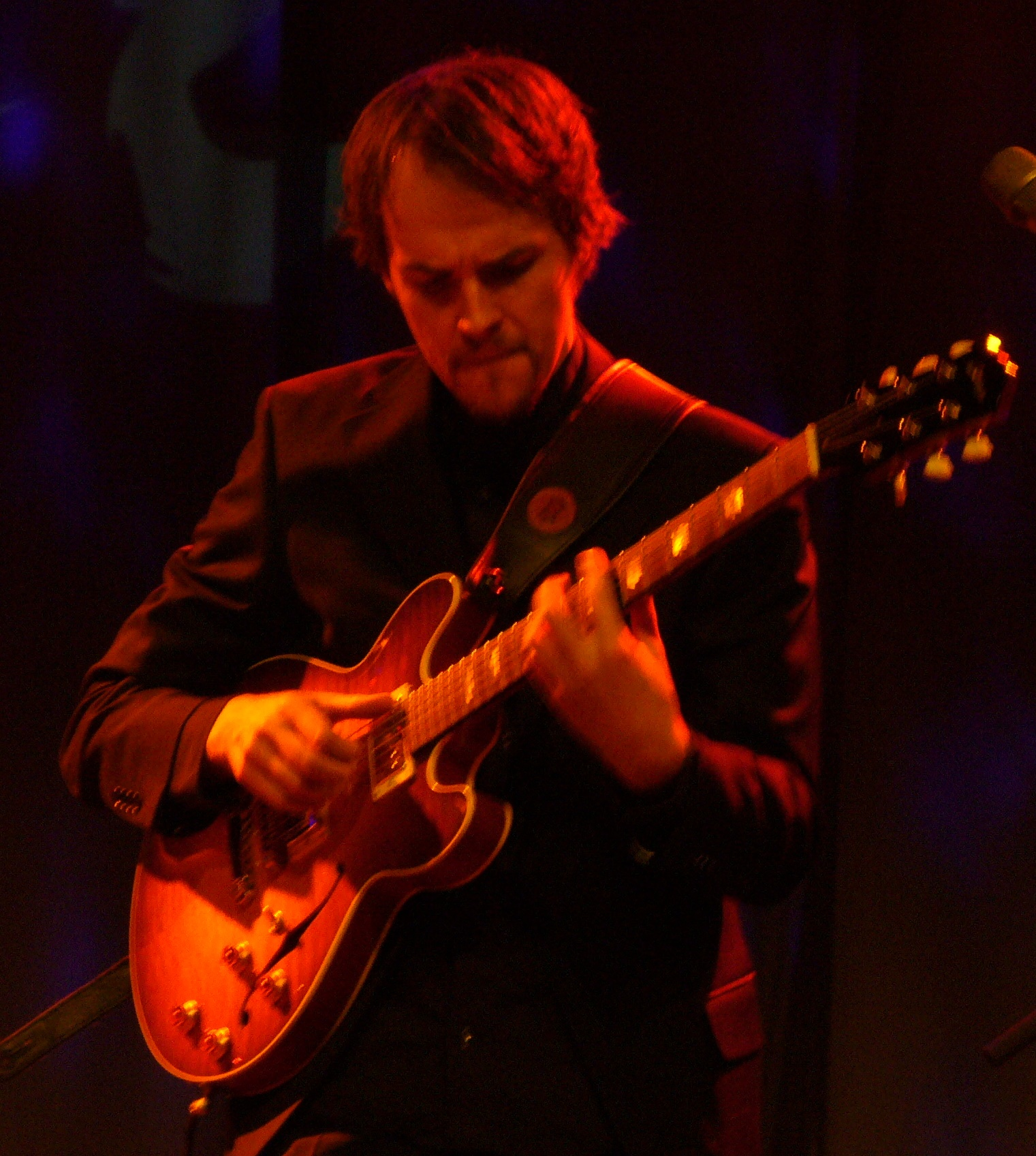
- Gisle Torvik at Vossajazz 12 April 2014.

Background information
- Born: 2 June 1975 (age 51); Bergen, Hordaland
- Origin: Norway
- Genres: Jazz
- Occupations: Musician, composer
- Instrument: Guitar
- Website: www.gisletorvik.com

Gisle Torvik (born 2 June 1975) is a Norwegian jazz musician (guitar) from Tørvikbygd in Hardanger.

== Career ==
Torvik was born in Bergen, and spent three years studying music at the Nordic Institute of Stage and Studio (Oslo, 1995–98) with a major in guitar and composition. He is considered one of the most talented Nordic jazz guitarists. Torvik released his first album in 1999 called Naken uten gitar (which translates to "Naked without guitar"), where Sigmund Groven, Petter Wettre, Frode Berg, Endre Christiansen and Torstein Lofthus contributed.

The album Frozen Moment was released in 2009 (ten years after his initial album) featuring Hilde Norbakken (on vocals and piano), to good reviews. The release concert was housed by 'Herr Nilsen' in Oslo 21 September 2009.

In 2011 Torvik reached the semi-final of ISC International Songwriting Competition with the tune "I remember". In 2013, he released his album Tranquil Fjord.

Torvik works as a composer, musician, arranger, producer as well as a music teacher, and plays Sadowsky guitars. He has been working with musicians such as Eddie Gómez, Bendik Hofseth, Dean Johnson, Sigmund Groven, Øystein Sevåg, Tony Moreno, Karl Seglem and many more.

At Vossajazz 2014, he gave a gigg presenting his "fjord-jazz" accompanied by Karl Seglem and Eple Trio, including Andreas Ulvo, Sigurd Hole and Jonas Howden Sjøvaag.

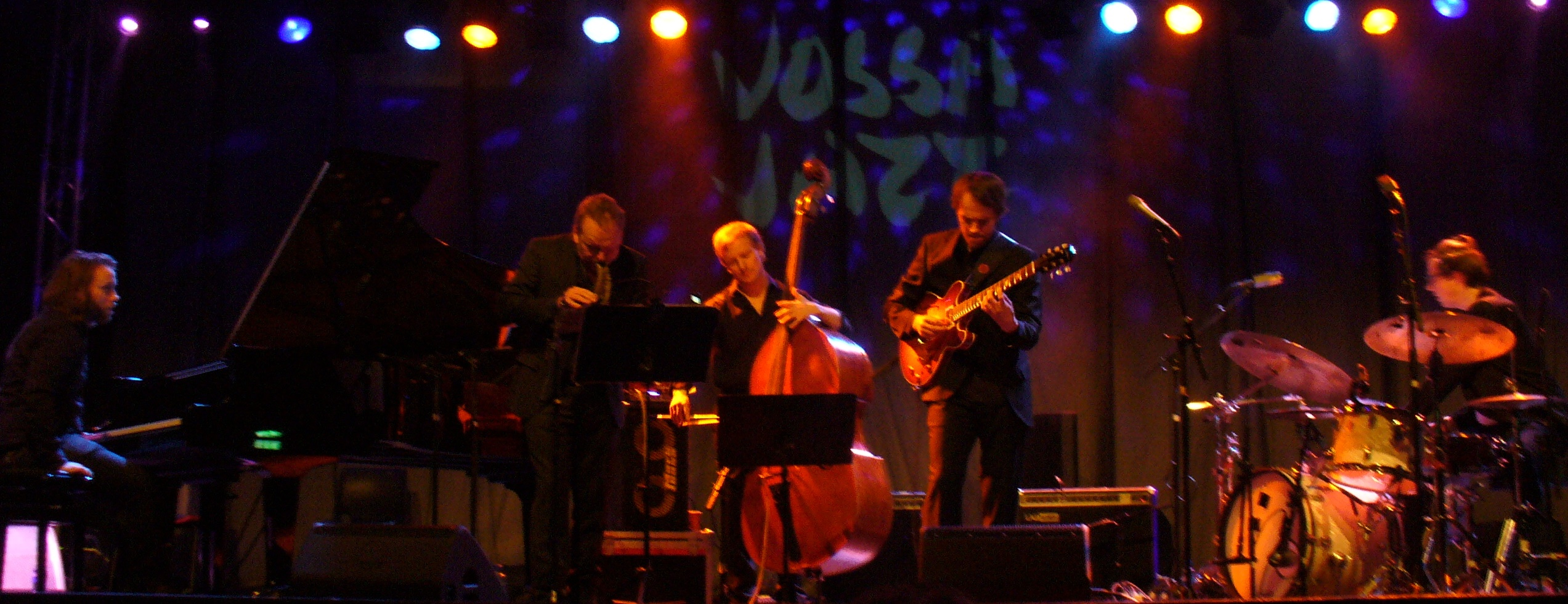
Gisle Torvik and Karl Seglem performing with Epletrio, Andreas Ulvo, Sigurd Hole and Jonas Howden Sjøvaag, at Vossajazz 2014.

== Discography ==
- 1999: Naken Uten Gitar ("Naked Without Guitar")
- 2009: Frozen Moment (Up North Discs), feat. Hilde Norbakken
- 2013: Tranquil Fjord (Ozella Music/NorCD), with Audun Ellingsen & Hermund Nygård
- 2014: Kryssande (NorCD), with Hardanger Big Band
