= Tore Sandbakken =

- Born: Tore Thorvaldsen Sandbakken; 14 May 1985 (age 40); Trondheim, Sør-Trøndelag
- Origin: Norway
- Genres: Jazz
- Occupations: Musician, composer
- Instrument: Drums
- Website: toresandbakken.com

Tore Thorvaldsen Sandbakken (born 14 May 1985 in Trondheim, Norway) is a Norwegian jazz musician (drums) and composer, living in Oslo, and known from collaborations in a number of bands, ranging from free improvised music to modern jazz.

== Career ==
Sandbakken holds a master's degree in drumming and improvisation from the Norwegian Academy of Music in Oslo, and the Rhythmic Music Conservatory in Copenhagen, with guidance from musicians such as Thomas Strønen, Tor Haugerud, Pål Thowsen, Kresten Osgood and Jonas Johansen. He has played in several bands like Aphrodisiac, Off Topic, Vojtech Prochazka Trio, Jens Carelius and Astrid E. Pedersen Ensemble. Together with Kim Johannesen and Svein Magnus Furu he was nominated for Spellemannprisen 2009, in the class Jazz for the album Kayak.

== Discography ==
- 2009: The Beat of The Travel (Viking Records), with Jens Carelius
- 2009: Kayak (AIM Sound City), with Kim Johannesen & Svein Magnus Furu
- 2009: Sacred Harp (The Perfect Hoax), with Sacred Harp
- 2010: Amoeba's Dance (Animal Music), with Vojtech Prochazka Trio
- 2010: Yearning (Park Grammofon), with Aphrodisiac
- 2011: The Architect (Jansen Plateproduksjon), with Jens Carelius
- 2012: Først (NorCD), with Dag-Filip Roaldsnes
- 2012: Dark Poetry (Creative Sources), within Bleak House
- 2013: Salmer og jazz, with Eli Helland
- 2013: Hot Music (Leo Records), with Arrigo Cappelletti 4tet
- 2013: A Tribute to Jack Teagarden (Herman Records), with Kristoffer Kompen
- 2013: Solen avløser regnet som avløser solen (Sofa Records), with Bergljot
- 2013: The Island (Impeller Records), with Ine Hoem
