= Andrea Rydin Berge =

Norwegian jazz musician, composer and band leader

- Born: 26 April 1984 (age 42); Oslo
- Origin: Norway
- Genres: Jazz
- Occupations: Musician, composer
- Instruments: Vocals, autoharp
- Label: NorCD
- Website: www.andrearydinberge.com

Andrea Rydin Berge (born 26 April) is a Norwegian jazz musician (vocals, piano and autoharp), composer and band leader, known from her own Andrea Kvintett.

== Education ==
Berge has a background from music studies at the University of Oslo and Complete Vocal Institute

== Andrea Kvintett ==
Quintet members, Svein Magnus Furu (tenor saxophone and clarinet), Harald Lassen (tenor saxophone), Kim-Erik Pedersen (alto and baritone saxophones) and Christian Meaas Svendsen (upright bass). She has experience from the Norwegian Academy of Music. All belong to the new generation that is starting to pave their way into the professional Norwegian jazz scene. The arrangements is by Berge and the band, and since she is also co-producer, there is not much doubt about who is the driving force in the band.

== Discography ==
Andrea Kvintett

- 2012: Andrea Kvintett (NorCD)
- 2013: Russian Dream (NorCD)
