= Kristoffer Eikrem =

Norwegian jazz musician, composer, and photographer (born 1989)

- Born: 6 June 1989 (age 37); Molde, Norway
- Origin: Norway
- Genre: Jazz
- Occupations: Musician, composer, music producer
- Instrument: Trumpet
- Label: NorCD
- Member of: Mopti
- Website: www.kristoffereikrem.com

Kristoffer Eikrem (born 6 June 1989 in Molde, Norway) is a Norwegian jazz musician (trumpet), composer and photographer, based in Oslo, Norway.

== Career ==
Eikrem holds a bachelor's degree in jazz performance from the Norwegian Academy of Music (2010). He has been recognized as trumpeter with Pixel, and won the 2016 Jazzstipendiat at Moldejazz. During the 2016 festival in Molde he got on stage with his own quartet and featured the American cool jazz saxophonist Jimmy Halperin.

== Honors ==
- 2015: Recipient of the Jazz stipend awarded by Shell at Moldejazz

== Discography ==
With Kjetil Jerve

- 2014: Feeling // Emotion (NorCD)

With Fredfades

- 2015: Jazz Cats (KingUnderground Records)

With Mopti

- 2013: Logic (Ocean Sound Recordings)
- 2015 in music|2015: Bits & Pieces (Jazzland Recordings)
