= Per Arne Ferner =

- Born: 1985 (age 40–41); Oslo, Norway
- Genres: Jazz
- Occupation: Musician
- Instrument: Guitar
- Labels: NorCD, Jazzaway
- Website: www.fernerjuliusson.com

Per Arne Ferner (born 1985) is a Norwegian jazz guitarist, known from bands like Flux and Ferner/Juliusson Duo.

== Career ==
Ferner is a graduate of the Copenhagen Rhythmic Music Conservatory. His first album Peninsulator (2010) was described as "a joyful roller coaster of youthful, exuberant energy" by the critique Jakob Baekgaard of the international Jazz journal All About Jazz, and further: "Filled with confidence and zest, Flux translates their eclectic approach into melodic explosions where the swirling dance of the flute meets the edginess of strings and modern grooves. Be prepared to be sucked in by the turbulence of the group's sound in the future."

Ferner started the duo Ferner/Juliusson in 2008 together with Per Gunnar Juliusson, fellow student at the Copenhagen Rhythmic Music Conservatory. When they won the Norwegian JazzIntro in 2010, Karin Krog, Norway's jazz queen and member of the JazzIntro jury, stated that "this is a duo with humor and charm, showing great potential through elegant interaction and warmth", not bad praise from one of the really big Jazz stars. Their music find inspiration from various musical directions, styles and ideals. They seek a broad appeal with a melodic, personal and open expression, and they like to work in the field of tension between structure and freedom, both improvisational and compositional. The references ranging from folk and 1900s classical music to free improvisation and jazz. But most of all their aesthetic references give associations to many of the 1970 ECM album by guitarist Ralph Towner, John Abercrombie and Jan Garbarek as well as Pat Metheny. Their first album was Undertowed released in 2012. Other responses to the album was: "These guys are just fantastic!" – John Kellman, editor of the All About Jazz, and "The Jazzintro winning duo Ferner/Juliusson, with Per Arne Ferner on guitar and Per Gunnar Juliusson on the piano, proved to us that they are the best of this format since Bill Evans and Jim Hall recorded the albumUndercurrent." – Journalist Roald Helgheim in the national Norwegian paper Dagsavisen, to mention two.

== Discography ==
Within Flux including Mikkel Breck (flute), Simon Linnert (piano), Marc Lohr (drums, percussion) & Jesper Thorn (bass)

- 2009: Peninsulator (Jazzaway)

Ferner/Juliusson duo with Per Gunnar Juliusson

- 2012: Undertowed (NorCD)
