= Thomas Winther Andersen =

Norwegian jazz bassist

- Born: 29 April 1969 (age 57); Oslo, Norway
- Genres: Jazz
- Occupations: Musician, composer, band leader
- Instrument: Double bass
- Label: NorCD
- Website: twandersen.com

Thomas Winther Andersen (born 29 April 1969) is a Norwegian-born, now Amsterdam-based jazz bassist, married to jazz singer Henriette Andersen.

== Career ==
Winther Andersen was born in Oslo, Norway. He toured extensively in Europe and the USA with different musicians and bands, like Lee Konitz, Jimmy Halperin, Sheila Jordan, Jasper Blom, Robert Rook, Michiel Borstlap. He graduated from Amsterdam Conservatory 1993 and supplemented with a master at the Conservatory of Den Hague 1994. In 1995 he received a grant from the Dutch foundation "Fonds Podiumkunsten", for the continuation of his studies in New York under guidance of Sal Mosca. He has composed numerous pieces for various jazz ensembles, music for large ensemble and at the same time composed chamber music.

His compositions were recorded for the Norwegian and Dutch radio and many of them are recorded on CD like his solo album Too Much Bass? (2002), as band leader: Line Up (1998) and Out From A Cool Storage (2004) within «Line Up», Sketch (1999) within «Sketch», Hymn For Fall (2006) within «Robert Rook Trio», Patchwork (2010), Spinnaker (2012) Flotsam (2019) within «Winther-Storm».

== Discography ==
=== Solo albums ===
- 2002: Too Much Bass? (NorCD)

=== As band leader ===
Within "Winther-Storm»

- 2010: Patchwork (NorCD)
- 2012: Spinnaker (NorCD)
- 2019: Flotsam (NorCD)

Within "Line Up»

- 1998: Line Up (NorCD)
- 2004: Out From A Cool Storage (NorCD)

Within "Sketch»

- 1999: Sketch (Via Jazz)

Within "Robert Rook Trio»

- 2008: Hymn For Fall (NorCD)

=== Collaborative works ===
- 2005: East of the Sun (Bluejack Jazz), Axel Hagen, Jimmy Halperin
- 2005: Dangerous Cats Live(Ultimate Jazz Records), Robert Rook
- 2005: Heart and Song (TWA Music), within Henriette Andersen Trio
- 2005: Trapperdetrap 2 Pom Pom Politieman (Byton Records)
- 2007: Dangerous Cats 2 (Ultimate Jazz Records), Robert Rook Live at Bimhuis
- 2008: Live in Amsterdam (Ultimate Jazz Records), Robert Rook Trio DVD
- 2010: Tribute To Jochem (Ultimate Jazz Records), Robert Rook
- 2013: Momentum (OAP Records), Robert Rook
- 2013: Shadows (Hipsecu), Olaf Zwetsloot Quartet
- 2017: From This Moment On (Indie), Simone Honijk
- 2018: Another Day At The Office (Axel Hagen Music), Axel Hagen Olaf Tarenskeen
- 2020: Chaimber9 Plays Ellington and Strayhoorn (Axel Hagen Music), Axel Hagen

== Awards ==
Independent Music Awards 2013: Spinnaker – Best Jazz Album
