= Andreas Haddeland =

- Born: 1977 (age 48–49); Sandefjord, Vestfold
- Origin: Norway
- Genres: Jazz
- Occupations: Musician; composer
- Instrument: Guitar
- Labels: NorCD, Tare Records
- Website: www.andreashaddeland.no

Andreas Haddeland (born 1977) is a Norwegian jazz guitarist. He was born in Sandefjord.

== Discography ==
=== Solo albums ===
- 2014: Tilhørighet (NorCD)
- 2019: Nyskudd (Tare Records)

=== Collaborations ===
With Legotrip

- 2003: Appetite For Construction (Glamfish)

With Line & The Lions

- 2018: Mountain Solitude (Losen Records)
