= Øyvind Mæland =

Norwegian composer (born 1985)

Øyvind Mæland (born 1985) is a Norwegian composer.

== Career ==
Øyvind Mæland studied the piano at the Barratt Due Institute of Music with Jiri Hlinka, before studying composition at the Norwegian Academy of Music with Olav Anton Thommessen, Ivar Frounberg and Henrik Hellstenius. He has also participated in several master classes, with lessons from composers such as Aperghis, Furrer, Billone, Ferneyhough, M. Stroppa and Czernowin.

Mæland's compositional output is primarily centered on chamber and ensemble works, and he has collaborated with such performers and ensembles as Håkon Austbø, Marco Fusi, Hans-Kristian Kjos Sørensen, Stine Motland, Pinquins, Oslo String Quartet, Kairos Quartet, Aksiom, BIT20 Ensemble with Pierre-André Valade, Telemark Chamber Orchestra, Bodø Sinfonietta, Sjøforsvarets musikkorps, and the Oslo Sinfonietta with Christian Eggen. His music has seen a number of performances at festivals such as Ultima Oslo Contemporary Music Festival, Borealis and Oslo International Chamber Music Festival.

In 2013 Mæland completed his two hour long opera Ad undas – Solaris Korrigert (for full orchestra, 6 soloists, and a nine-voiced choir), which opened at the Norwegian Opera House in October the same year. He worked closely with the poet Øyvind Rimbereid, and the performance artist Lisa C. Baudoin Lie was director.

In 2015 Mæland released eight works variously on labels Lawo, Fabra and Geiger, with Stine Motland and Sanae Yoshida, Marco Fusi, Oslo String Quartet, Aksiom and Telemark Chamber Orchestra.

Øyvind Mæland's work is listed in the National Library of Norway

== Selected works ==
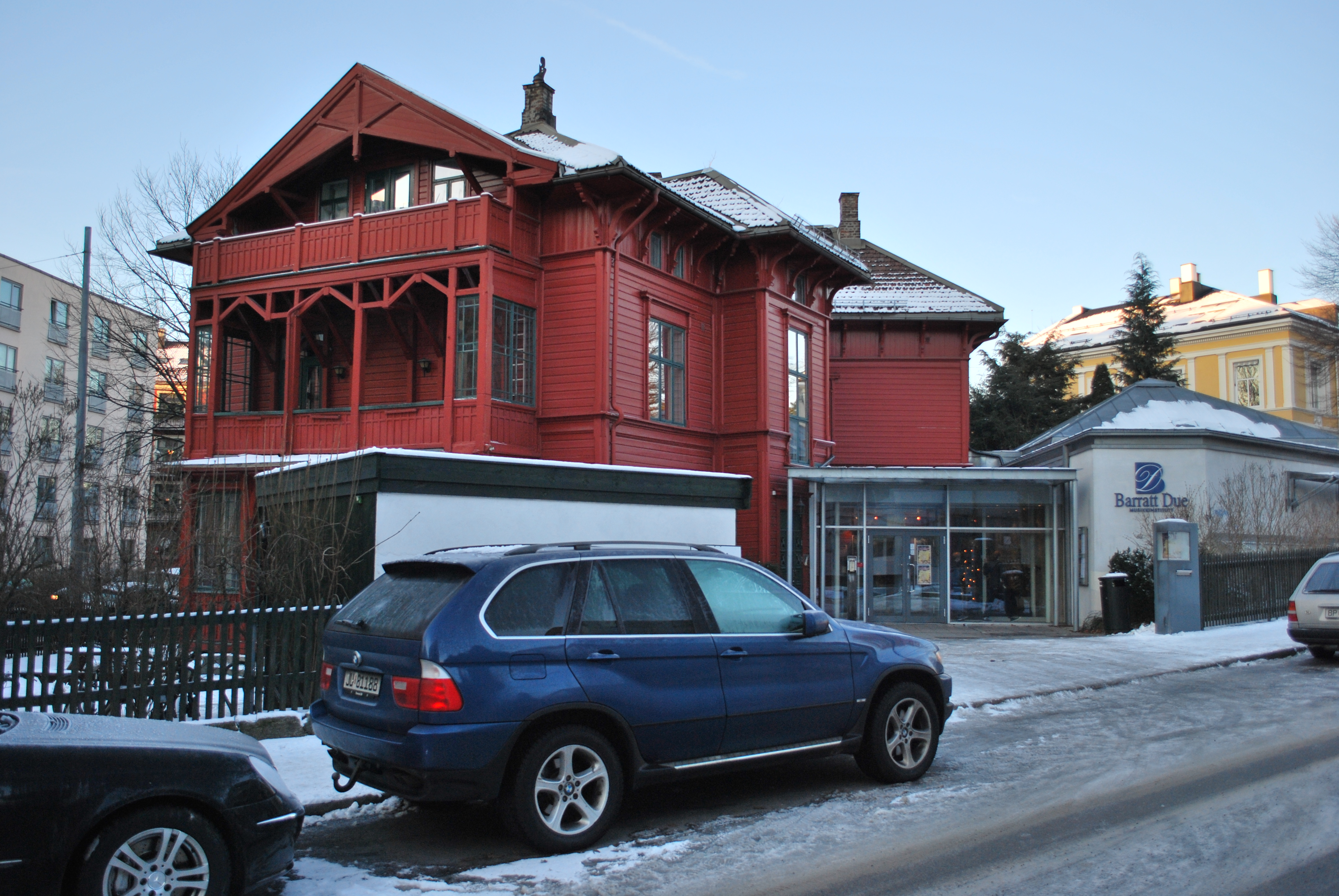
Barratt Due Institute, Oslo

- Aksiom (2017, self-titled album)
- Procession and drought for percussion trio. (2009/2014)
- SIDDY Stavgersand from "Sci-fi-Lieder from the North Sea!" (2011)
- Glimpse – vanished for piano solo (2012)
- String quartet in 2 movements (2009/10) (1)
- String quartet in 2 movements (2009/10) (2)
- Through surfaces duo for violin and piano, (Sci-fi-Lieder album). (2008)
