= Deflation (disambiguation) =

Commonly, deflation refers to a decrease in the general price level, the opposite of inflation.

Deflation may also refer to:

- A release or escape of air or gas from an inflatable, resulting in its shrinking or collapsing
- A mode of wind erosion
- Dividing a polynomial by a linear factor which decreases its degree by one in multiple root-finding algorithms, as done for example in the Jenkins–Traub algorithm
- In philosophy, the use of a deflationary theory of truth, where the term truth is rejected as a real property of propositions
- Deflation (film), a 2001 short film
- Deflate, a widely used lossless compression algorithm originating from the program PKZIP

== See also ==
- Deflationary theory of truth
- Inflation (disambiguation), the antonym of deflation
