= Isglem =

- Origin: Bergen, Norway
- Genres: Free jazz Traditional music
- Years active: 1987–present
- Labels: NorCD
- Members: Karl Seglem; Terje Isungset

Isglem (established 1987 in Bergen, Norway) is a Norwegian musical duo comprising Karl Seglem and Terje Isungset. Their traditional music and free jazz-based expression involves an unusual amount of improvisation and has given the pairing a pioneer stamp. They have released four albums on the NorCD label and performed at Nattjazz in 1991, 1992 and 1993. Isglem toured Ireland with Mark O'Leary in 2002. They have several national tours under the auspices of Rikskonsertene.

== Band members ==
- Terje Isungset - percussion and mouth harp
- Karl Seglem - saxophone and bukkehorn

== Discography ==
- 1991: Rom (NorCD), recorded at Lien Grendehus at Geilo
- 1992: To steg (NorCD)
- 1996: Null G (NorCD)
- 2003: Fire (NorCD)
- 2016: 5te (NorCD)
