= Kenneth Sivertsen (musician) =

Norwegian musician, composer, poet, and comedian

- Born: 16 January 1961; Bømlo, Norway
- Died: December 24, 2006 (aged 45); Haukeland Universitetssykehus, Bergen, Norway
- Occupations: Musician (guitar), composer, comedian, poet
- Website: www.kennethsivertsen.com

Kenneth Sivertsen (16 January 1961 – 24 December 2006) was a Norwegian musician, composer, poet, and comedian.

== Background ==
Born in Mosterhamn, a small settlement on the Norwegian island of Bømlo, Sivertsen made a musical debut playing the bass guitar at a Christmas party at age 8. Years later he went on to form the group One Two Three together with his friends. After secondary school he went on to attend Voss Folk High School, where he expanded his musical sensibilities. Several of the guitar pieces he composed at this time went on to be released on his album Spør Vinden (1988).

In 1981 he composed his first symphony, Håp (Hope), which would go on to be performed by the Oslo Philharmonic Orchestra. Throughout the 1980s Sivertsen would become nationally known through several TV appearances and radio broadcasts, as well as musical tours with Jan Eggum, among others. In 1984 he composed the symphony Timeglaset og Morgonstjerna (The Hourglass and the Morning Star).

Sivertsen worked with a number of prominent American jazz musicians, including Michael Brecker, Mike Mainieri, Tony Levin, and Bob Mintzer. The albums Remembering North (1993) and One Day In October (1998) were both released in the United States, and were received to favorable international acclaim.

From 1992 to 1997 he was in a both personal and artistic relationship with Norwegian singer and actress Herborg Kråkevik. Together they produced Cabaret, a successful stage show, as well as the album Mi Haugtussa.

== Illness and death ==
On March 27, 2005, Sivertsen suffered severe head trauma after collapsing from an epilepsy attack during a visit in Haugesund, Norway. The damage from the fall caused a brain haemorrhage which forced doctors to remove parts of his skull for him to be able to survive the ordeal, and he spent nearly a week in a coma following surgery. Following several operations, he spent the next three months in various hospitals and recreation centers. In October 2006 he suffered yet another serious epilepsy attack, causing another near-fatal fall in his home. The fall left him incapacitated for the remainder of his life, spending his last two months in intensive care.

Sivertsen died on Haukeland Universitetssykehus in Bergen on Christmas Eve 2006 from complications from epilepsy and the several brain haemorrhages suffered the previous two years. A series of tribute concerts for Sivertsen were held in the weeks prior to his death, with the final concert scheduled for December 26, two days after his death.

On January 16, 2011, a celebration of Sivertsen's life was held in his hometown of Mosterhamn, on what would have been his 50th birthday. In September 2011, it was also announced that the street where he lived in Bømlo would be renamed Kenneth Sivertsens veg (Kenneth Sivertsens Road) in his honour.

== Main works ==
- 1980: Largo i Bb-moll (December) – for tenor saxophone, klaver and string orchestra
- 1981: Spør vinden – for cello and guitar
- 1981: Miniature suite – for wind trio
- 1981/84: Håp – Symfoni nr. 1 - premiered by Oslo Philharmonic Orchestra
- 1983: For ope hav I – chamber version
- 1983: For ope hav II – orchestral version
- 1984/89: Timeglaset og Morgonstjerna – Symfoni nr. 2 – premiered by Oslo Philharmonic Orchestra
- 1984: Festens gave – for choir, flute and piano
- 1985: Før og etterdønning – for chamber orchestra
- 1987: Døtrene – for choir, violin and guitar
- 1987: Himmelsyn – for choir, jazz ensemble and orchestra
- 1989: Dragning – for clarinet and string orchestra
- 1990: Teatermusikk – to the play "Da jeg var liten var jeg vill og gal" ("When I was little I was wild and crazy"), Den Nationale Scene
- 1990: Whistling wind – for girls choir, flute, piano and synthesizer
- 1990: Fylg tanken – for among others children's choir, fiddle and electric guitar
- 1991: Buicken – film music with Reidar Skår
- 1991: Brevet til Loise – for girls choir, piano, cello and flute
- 1991: Steingarden – for string quartet
- 1992: På veg til Hardanger – for among others fiddle, tenor saxophone and piano
- 1993: Jordbær under sneen – for strings, jazz orchestra with soloist
- 1994: Eiketreet – for harmonica and strings
- 1995: Brytningstid – festival ballet Carte Blanche at Bergen International Festival
- 2000: Sollandet frå grav – for trumpet
- 2003: Requiem – commission for Bergen International Festival

== Discography ==
As performer and composer

- 1983: Einsamflygar (Kirkelig Kulturverksted)
- 1985: Amalgamation (Hot Club Records)
- 1988: Spør Vinden (NorCD)
- 1990: Flo (Kirkelig Kulturverksted)
- 1993: Remembering North (NorCD)
- 1994: High Tide (Nimis Records)
- 1995: Den Lilla Kvelven (Nimis Records), with Jon Fosse
- 1996: Draumespor (Norsk Plateproduksjon)
- 1997: Brytningstid (Nimis Records)
- 1998: Melk Og Honning (Kirkelig Kulturverksted)
- 1998: One Day In October (Nimis Records)
- 2000: Blod & Bensin (Edel Records)
- 2004: Fløyel (Noble Records)

As composer

- 2002: Steingarden (Vest-Norsk Plateselskap), with Hansakvartetten
- 2005: Philharmonica (Pro Musica), the piece "Søkjer din fred" soloist Sigmund Groven (harmonica) with Kringkastingsorkesteret conducted by Christian Eggen
- 2014: Dragning (Amethyst Records), including five pieces of chamber music by Kenneth Sivertsen: Dragning, For ope hav, Døtrene, Largo and Brevet til Loise
