= Inflation (disambiguation) =

Inflation most commonly refers to a rise in the general price level over a period of time (also known as price inflation).

Inflation may also refer to:

== Business and economics ==
- Job title inflation
- Monetary inflation, an expansion in the quantity of money in an economy

== Education ==
- Credential inflation, the devaluing of academic credentials and increase in academic requirements, due to the increase over time of the average level of education
- Grade inflation, the increase over time of academic grades, faster than any real increase in standards

== Natural sciences ==
- Inflation (cosmology), the expansion of space in the early universe at an exponential high rate

- Warm inflation, a particular description of cosmological inflation

- the act of inflating an inflatable, anything designed to be expanded with air or gas (such as a balloon)
- the pufferfish's ability to inflate its body when under duress

== Mathematics and computation ==
- The action of INFLATE, the algorithm that reverses DEFLATE compression
- The inflation map in group cohomology (mathematics)

== Other ==
- Body inflation, a type of paraphilia

== See also ==
- Expansion (disambiguation)
- Deflation (disambiguation), the antonym of inflation
