= Kjetil Jerve =

Norwegian jazz pianist and composer (born 1988)

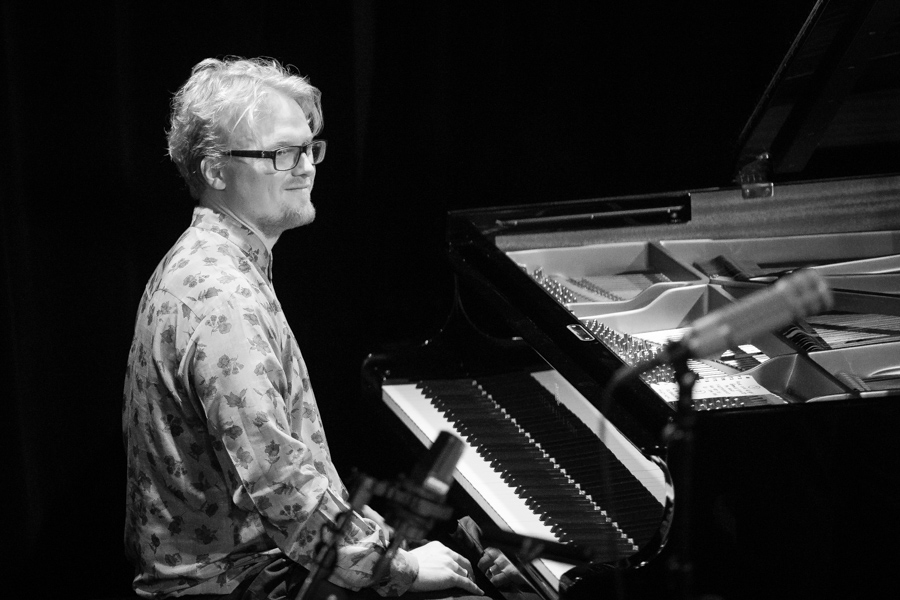
- Kjetil Jerve performing in 2019

Background information
- Born: 28 August 1988 (age 38); Ålesund, Norway
- Genres: Jazz
- Occupations: Musician, composer, bandleader
- Instrument: Piano
- Years active: 2010–present
- Labels: AMP Music & Records
- Website: www.kjetiljerve.com

Kjetil Jerve (born 28 August 1988) is a Norwegian jazz pianist and composer. He was born in Ålesund.

== Discography ==
=== Solo albums ===
- 2016: New York Improvisations (Dugnad Rec), with Jimmy Halperin, Drew Gress
- 2017: Circumstances (AMP Music & Records), with Anders Thorén, Tim Thornton
- 2020: The Soundtrack Of My Home (Dugnad Rec)

=== Collaborations ===
With Lana Trio (Andreas Wildhagen, Henrik Munkeby Nørstebø)

- 2013: Lana Trio (Va Fongool)
- 2014: Live In Japan (Va Fongool)
- 2018: Lana Trio With Sofia Jernberg (Clean Feed)

With Kristoffer Eikrem

- 2014: Feeling // Emotion (NorCD)

With Orter Eparg (Andreas Wildhagen, Dan Peter Sundland)

- 2016: Orter Eparg (Øra Fonogram)

With Akmee (Andreas Wildhagen, Erik Kimestad Pedersen, Erlend Albertsen)

- 2017: Neptun (Nakama Records)

With RødssalG nEEn GlassdøR (Andreas Wildhagen, Erik Kimestad Pedersen, Erlend Albertsen, Martin Myhre Olsen, Nils Andreas Granseth)

- 2018: RødssalG nEEn GlassdøR (Dugnad Rec)

With Jul På Sunnmørsk (Henrik Lødøen, Martin Morland, Siril Malmedal Hauge, Sondre Ferstad)

- 2018: Jul På Sunnmørsk (Dugnad Rec)
