= Jimmy Halperin =

- Born: 1958 (age 66–67); Queens, New York City
- Origin: U.S.A
- Genres: Jazz
- Occupation: Musician
- Instrument(s): Tenor saxophone, soprano saxophone
- Website: www.jimmyhalperin.com

Jimmy Halperin (1958) is an American saxophonist (tenor and soprano) and composer in avant-garde jazz and new improvised music.

== Biography ==
Halperin was influenced by Lennie Tristano, and he got lessons with Tristano and Sal Mosca at a young age. He did his first recordings in 1986 with the Warne Marsh Quintet (Back Home at the label CrissCross). Since 1982, Halperin worked with bassist Dominic Duval and the first joint recordings were made until 2003.

In 1997 Halperin released his debut album under his own name on the label Zinnia, a Tristano-dedicated duet with Sal Mosca (Psalm). In 1998 he joined the Thomas Andersen Quintet (NorCD), and in 2001, he participated in a trio with bassist Don Messina and drummer Bill Chattin on Cadence Jazz Records. At this time he also worked at CIMP as a session musician with Duval and Jay Rosen.

In 2003 he released the album Joy And Gravitas, also on CIMP, with interpretations of jazz standards, i.e. "A Night in Tunisia", "Love for Sale", "My Funny Valentine", "Don't Explain", "Naima" and "Round Midnight!. This was followed by the duo album Monkinus by Halperin and Duval on the label CIMP. In 2009 Halperin and Duval recorded the music of Thelonious Monk on the album Monk Dreams, released on the Lithuanian label NoBusiness Records. In June 2009 they played at the Jazzfest Villach.

Halperin has also played with pianist Andreas Schmidt, Alex Hagen 'Stringproject', and in 2007, he recorded as a duo with guitarist Joe Giglio - "Sound Scape". In 2015 the album "Snow Tiger" was released, a collaboration with Swedish guitarist Pål Nyberg, with whom he toured extensively from 2015 to 2017. In 2016 he was featured artist with the Norwegian Kristoffer Eikrem Quintet at the Moldejazz.

== Discography ==
=== Solo albums ===
- 1997: Psalm (Zinnia Records), with Sal Mosca
- 2001: Cycle Logical (Cadence Jazz Records), with Don Messina and Bill Chattin
- 2003: Joy and Gravitas (CIMP), with Dominic Duval and Jay Rosen
- 2005: East of the Sun (Blue Jack), with Axel Hagen, Thomas Winther Andersen
- 2009: Changing Tranes (City Hall, NoBusiness Records), with Dominic Duval
- 2019: High and Outside (CIMP), with Don Messina and Bill Chattin

=== Collaborations ===
With Warne Marsh Quartet & Quintet

- 1986: Back Home (Criss Cross Jazz)

With Dominic Duval

- 2005: Monkinus (CIMP)
- 2009: Monk Dreams (NoBusiness Records)
- 2010: Music Of John Coltrane (NoBusiness Records)

With Halperin-Nyberg Connection

- 2015 :"Snow Tiger" (Sthlm Jazz Records)

With Joe Giglio 2007: "Sound Scape"

With Kjetil Jerve and Drew Gress

- 2016: New York Improvisations (Dugnad Rec)

Jimmy Halperin with Pål Nyberg Trio

- 2017: "Live at A-trane - Berlin" (Klangverk Recordings)
