= Sigurd Hole =

Norwegian jazz upright bass player (born 1981)

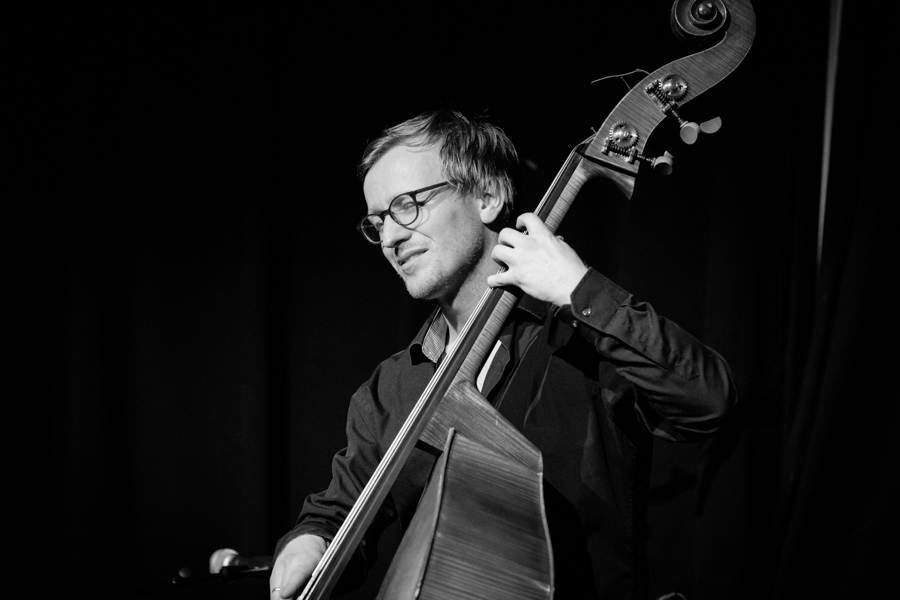
- Sigurd Hole on stage at Kongshaugfestivalen 2019

Background information
- Born: 13 July 1981 (age 45); Elverum, Hedmark
- Origin: Norway
- Genres: Jazz
- Occupations: Jazz musician and composer
- Instrument: Upright bass
- Label: NorCD
- Website: www.sigurdhole.no

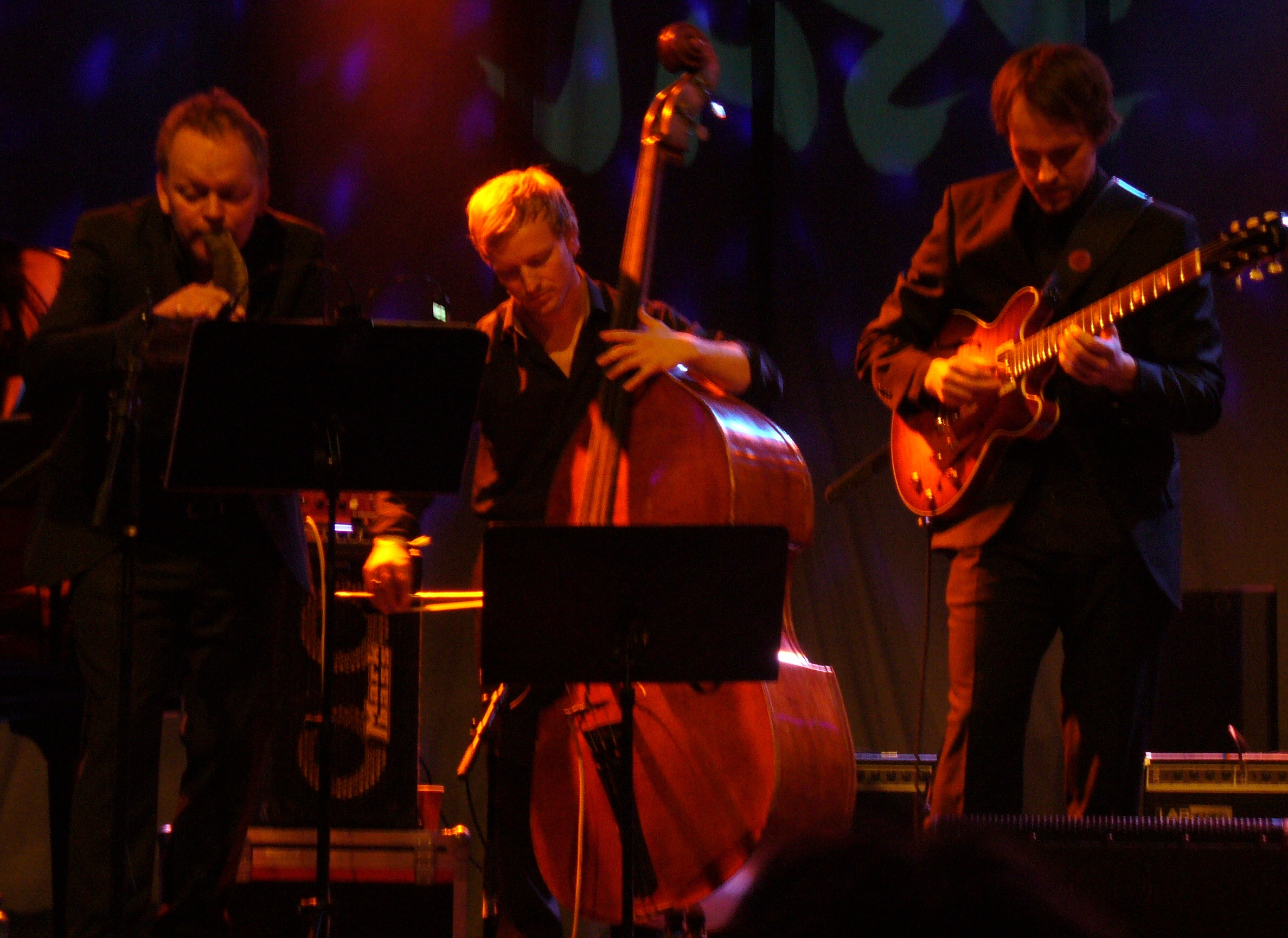
Karl Seglem, Sigurd Hole and Gisle Torvik at Vossajazz 2014. (Photo by Knut Anderen)

Sigurd Hole (born 13 July 1981) is a Norwegian jazz musician (upright bass) from Rendalen living in Oslo.

== Biography ==
Sigurd Hole was born in Elverum Municipality, Norway, and has worked in jazz ensembles and presented content related to Norwegian folk music. He has been nominated for a Norwegian Grammy twice in recent years.

Hole released his first album as a leader, the solo double bass album called "Elvesang", in January 2018. Influenced by classical minimalism, his own Norwegian musical heritage and the sound of the Japanese Shakuhachi flute, he explores the double bass as a medium of sound, creating more often than not meditative movements resembling abstract images of different sounds and objects in nature. "Elvesang", described by The New York Times as "An atmospheric solo bass album", was included in prestigious Best of 2018 lists both in All About Jazz and The New York City Jazz Record. In February 2020 he will release a new solo double bass album called "Lys / Mørke". The double album recorded on the arctic islands of Fleinvær in Northern Norway can in many ways be seen as a response to our the climate and ecological crisis, focusing in large on the conscious act of really listening to the natural world - both on a concrete and on a more abstract level. The album will be premiered in Weill Recital Hall at Carnegie Hall on February 3, 2020, as one of the very few solo double bass concerts ever to have been performed at this legendary venue.

With drummer Jarle Vespestad and violinist Håkon Aase, Hole formed his own trio (Sigurd Hole Trio) in 2015. The trio released its debut album "Encounters" in April 2018, to critical acclaim both in Norway and around the world. Inspired by different traditional music such as the Indian, Middle Eastern and Norwegian folk music, the trio explores elements from these old musical traditions, combining them with their own expressions as improvising musicians of today. The result is a unique mix of eastern and western musical traditions - an open ended, “borderless” form of chamber music described by Jazz Journal UK as being “Finely textured, vividly coloured and rooted in no specific place or time”. The trio has performed at major Norwegian festivals like Bergen International Festival and Varangerfestivalen, and has toured Germany, Belgium, Holland and the US.

Besides his own projects Hole is also an important part of the vibrant Norgwegian jazz scene in ensembles like Tord Gustavsen trio, Eple Trio and Karl Seglem acoustic quartet. He has played and collaborated with amongst others Helge Lien, Bugge Wesseltoft, Eli Storbekken, Nils Økland, Terje Isungset, Frode Haltli, Trygve Seim, Audun Sandvik, Arve Henriksen, Morten Quenild, Espen Rud, Torgrim Sollied, Birger Mistereggen, Tom Steiner Lund, Aasmund Nordstoga, Sondre Bratland, Live Maria Roggen, Solveig Slettahjell, Odd Nordstoga, The Norwegian Chamber Orchestra and og The Norwegian Radio Orchestra, been part of about 40 album releases and performed stages world wide like Wellington Opera House, Cadogan Hall in London og Lincoln Center in New York. In addition to his artistic work he was a double bass, ensembles and improvisation teacher at the Norwegian Academy of Music from 2007-2019.

== Discography ==
=== Solo albums ===
- 2018: Elvesang (Elvesang)
- 2018: Encounters (Elvesang) - Sigurd Hole trio med Jarle Vespestad og Håkon Aase.
- 2020: Lys / Mørke (Elvesang, dobbeltalbum. Utgis 14. februar. Pre-releasekonsert i Weill Recital Hall i Carnegie Hall 3. februar)

=== Collaborations ===
- 2007: Made This, Eple Trio (NorCD)
- 2008: The Widening Sphere of influence, Eple Trio (NorCD)
- 2009: Norskjazz.no, Karl Seglem(Ozella)
- 2009: Skoddeheimen, Eple Trio + Karl Seglem and Lindha Kallerdal (NorCD)
- 2009: Arme jord ha Jolefred, Kvindelige studenter sangforening (LAWO Classics)
- 2010: Alle e aleina, Jan Toft (Warner Music)
- 2010: Comfort Call, Jon Eberson Group (JEG Records)
- 2010: In the Clearing / In the Cavern, Eple Trio (NorCD)
- 2011: The Coarse Sand And The Names We Wrote, Jon Eberson Group (JEG Records)
- 2012: Prøysen goes Jazz, 4 fyrer (Curlinglegs)
- 2013: Nye songar.no, Karl Seglem (Ozella)
- 2013: Jorba, Ole Jørn Myklebust (Finito Bacalao records)
- 2014: Universal Cycle, Eple Trio (Shipwrecords)
- 2014: Eberson Funk Ensemble (JEG records). Spilt inn høsten 2013.
- 2014: Lyden av Prøysen, Helge Lien & Sigurd Hole (Grappa)
- 2014: Jolevisur– Bolteløkka jentekor (Grappa)
- 2015: Østerdalsmusikk (NorCD)
- 2015: Waves, Seglem / Stiefel (Challenge Records).
- 2015: Live in Germany, Karl Seglem acoustic quartet (NorCD)
- 2015: Jul på orkesterplass, The Norwegian Radio Orchestra (KKV)
- 2016: Nordic Balm, Karl Seglem acoustic quartet (NorCD).
- 2016: Fabel, Eli Storbekken & Sigurd Hole (Grappa).
- 2016: StaiStua, Andreas Ulvo / Frode Haltli / Sigurd Hole (NorCD)
- 2017: Bak jorda ein plass, Jon Eberson Group (JEG records)
- 2017: West wind drift, Jonas Sjøvaag / Karl Seglem / Sigurd Hole (NORCD)
- 2017: 5, Eple Trio (Shipwreckords)
- 2018: The Other Side, Tord Gustavsen trio (ECM)
- 2018: Nunatak, Karl Seglem World Jazz band (Ozella)
- 2019: Play Ballads, Jon Eberson & Sigurd Hole (JEG Records)

== See also ==
- List of jazz bassists
