= Karl Seglem =

Norwegian jazz musician and composer

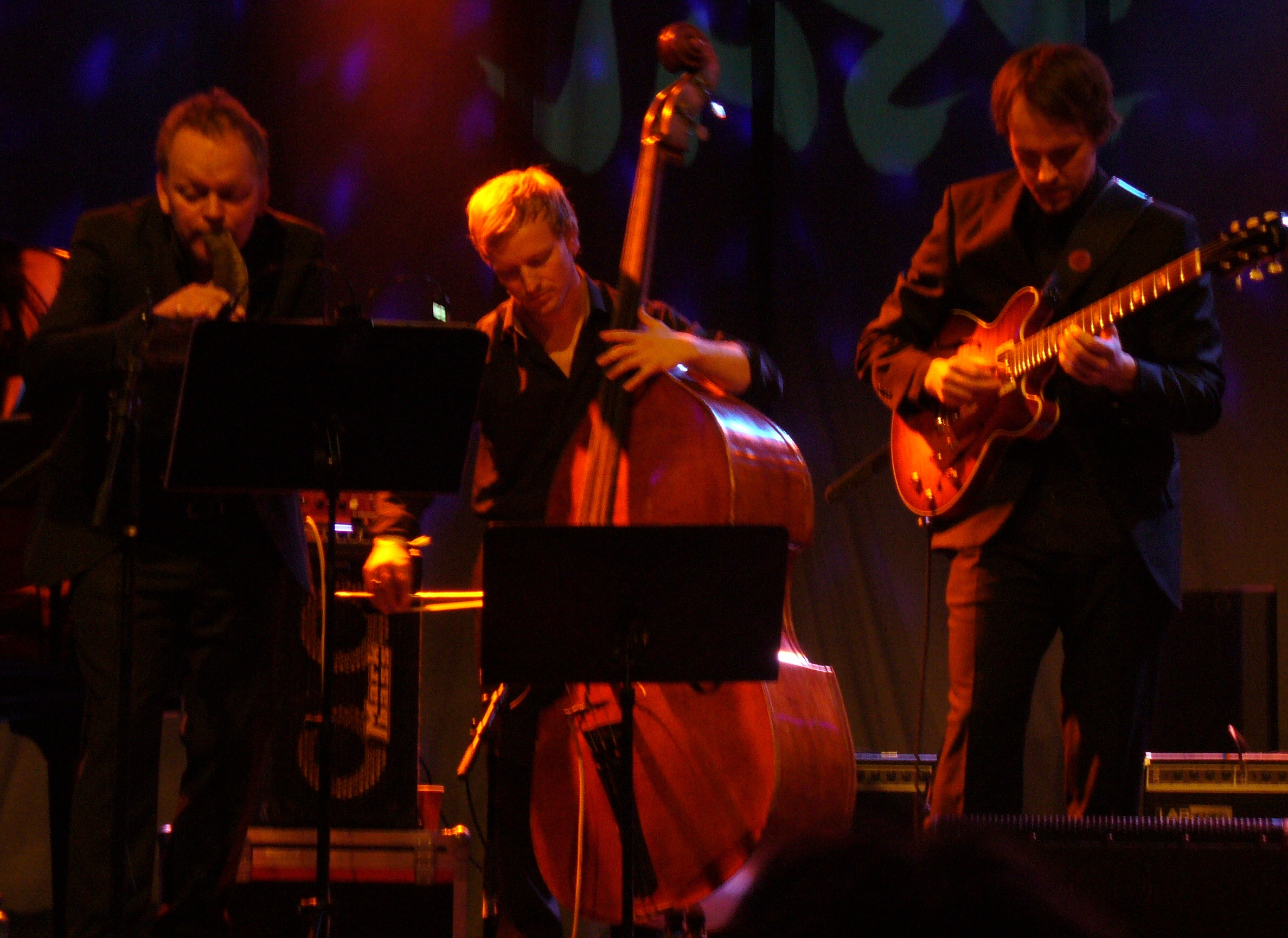
- Karl Seglem, Sigurd Hole and Gisle Torvik at Vossajazz 2014.

Background information
- Born: 8 July 1961 (age 65); Årdalstangen, Norway
- Origin: Norway
- Genres: Jazz, traditional music
- Occupations: Musician, composer
- Instruments: Saxophone, bukkehorn
- Labels: NorCD; Ozella Music
- Website: www.karlseglem.no

Karl Seglem (born 8 July 1961) is a Norwegian Jazz musician (saxophone and bukkehorn), composer and producer, known from a series of combined jazz and traditional music releases, as well as leading his own record label NorCD from 1991.

== Career ==
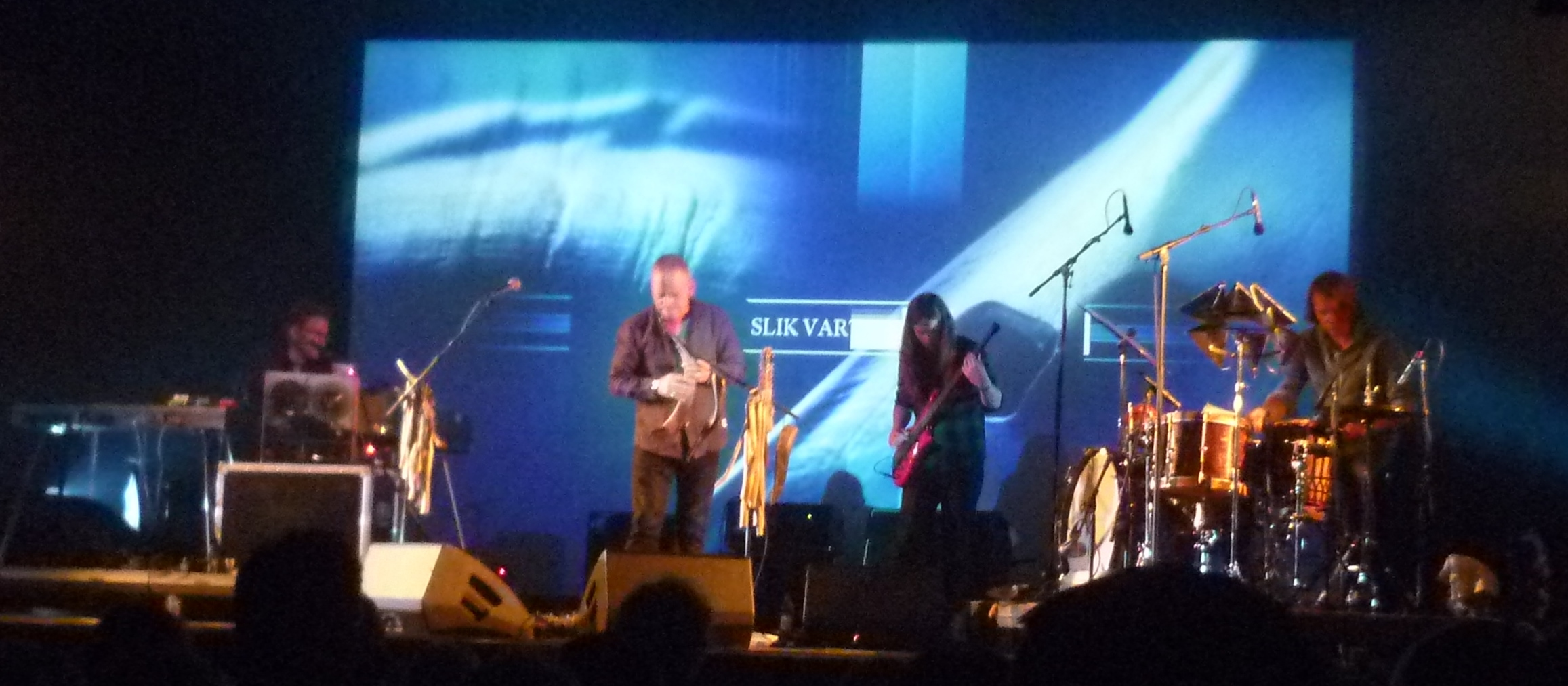
Seglem with JazzBukk at the 2016 Nattjazz in Bergen.

Seglem was born in Årdalstangen, and entered the Music program at Voss Folk High School (1978–80), followed by cooperation with Arvid Genius, «Jan Grieg Qvartet», Kenneth Sivertsen (1980–92) and Knut Kristiansen (during the 1980s) in Bergen. He also led his own Jazz band «Growl», wrote for the magazin «Jazznytt» and was politically active in Foreningen norske jazzmusikere.

He has released eight albums in his own name, and has a long lasting cooperation with Terje Isungset like in the bands Isglem and trio «Utla» where also fiddle player Håkon Høgemo contributed, resulting in many record releases on his own label. He has also released two albums cooperating with the poet Jon Fosse.

Around 2000 he started experimenting with the old Norwegian instrument bukkehorn or Billy Goat Horn. He is currently the main instrumentalist playing the instrument in the world.

Seglem has toured extensively with Rikskonsertene and Den norske jazzscene. In 2013 he also toured in Norway with Morning Has Occurred fronted by Natalie Sandtorv and Marte Eberson, for the project 'Jazz til ungdom' (Jazz to the youth).

At Vossajazz 2014, he joined Gisle Torvik presenting his "fjord-jazz" together with Andreas Ulvo and Epletrio, including Sigurd Hole and Jonas Howden Sjøvaag.

== Honors ==
- 1983: Årdal Kommune´s Culture Prize
- 1998: Gammleng-prisen in open class
- 1998: Edvard Prize in the class Popular music, major work, together with Reidar Skår for TYA
- 2010: Buddyprisen
- 2012: Commissioned work Som spor at Vossajazz

== Discography ==
- 1988: Poems for Trio (Hot Club Records; with Kåre Thomsen and Ole Amund Gjersvik)
- 1991: Sogn-A-Song (NorCD)
- 1994: Rit (NorCD)
- 1998: Spir (album) (NorCD)
- 2002: Nye nord (NorCD)
- 2004: New north (NorCD)
- 2004: Femstein (NorCD)
- 2005: Budda og reven Singie (NorCD)
- 2005: Reik (NorCD)
- 2006: Urbs (NorCD)
- 2008: Spelferd – a playful journey DVD (NorCD)
- 2009: NORSKjazz.no (NorCD)
- 2009: Skoddeheimen (NorCD)
- 2009: Draumkvedet (NorCD)
- 2010: Ossicles (NorCD)
- 2013: NyeSongar.no (Ozella Music)
- 2014: Som Spor (NorCD)
- 2015: Lærad The Tree (NorCD)
- 2015: Live In Germany (NorCD)
- 2015: WorldJazz (NorCD)
- 2016: Nordic Balm (NorCD)

Awards
Preceded by Agnes Buen Garnås	Recipient of the Gammleng-prisen Open class 1998	Succeeded by Steinar Ofsdal
Preceded by Dag Arnesen	Recipient of the Buddyprisen; 2010	Succeeded by Eldbjørg Raknes
