= Norwegian Academy of Music =

Music conservatory in Oslo, Norway

Coordinates: 59°55′56.15″N 10°42′50.01″E

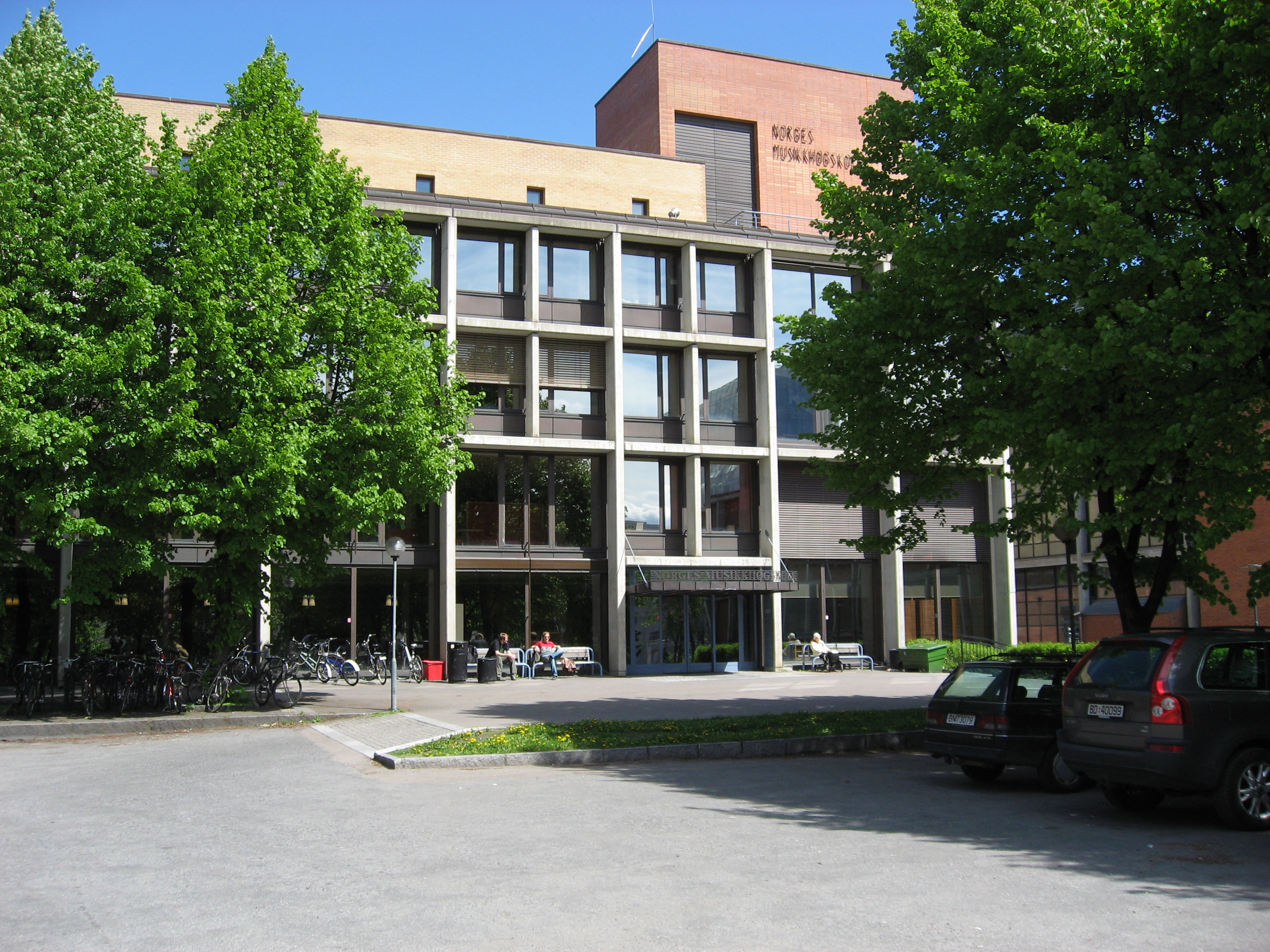
The Norwegian Academy of Music

The Norwegian Academy of Music (Norwegian: Norges musikkhøgskole, NMH) is a university-level music conservatory located in Oslo, Norway, in the neighbourhood of Majorstuen, Frogner. It is the largest music academy in Norway and offers the country's highest level of music education. As a specialized university (vitenskapelig høgskole), it offers both undergraduate and postgraduate courses. Throughout the years the Academy has educated many of Norway's most renowned musicians.

The Norwegian Academy of Music educates performers, composers and pedagogues, and attempts to lay the foundation for research within various fields of music. It educates musicians within folk music genres, church music, classical music and, quite notably in later years, a string of successful performers within the jazz realm.

The Academy is also Oslo's biggest concert organizer, presenting approximately 300 concerts a year.

As is the case with all schools in the Norwegian educational system, the school is free of charge. Students can only be accepted by auditioning and/or other verifiable qualifications.

== History ==
The Norwegian Academy of Music was established in 1973 (53 years ago). The Academy is a result of a merger with the former Østlandets musikkonservatorium in 1996, which was a successor to the music school at Veitvet founded by Olav Selvaag.

The request for a governmental institution for music education goes back to the 19th century. In 1883 Ludvig Mathias Lindeman (father) and Peter Brynie Lindeman (son) started the so-called "School for Organists" in Kristiania (former name for Oslo). It developed to become the first and biggest conservatory of music in Norway, and made an important foundation for the Norwegian Academy of Music. The Lindeman conservatory was discontinued in 1973. To honour the memory of the Lindeman family, the biggest concert hall at the Academy is named the Lindeman Hall, which has a capacity of more than 400 people.

== Notable faculty members ==
- Leif Ove Andsnes
- Vilde Frang
- Bjørn Kruse
- Aage Kvalbein
- Truls Mørk
- Arve Tellefsen
- Håkon Thelin
- Olav Anton Thommessen
- Lasse Thoresen

== Notable alumni ==
- Edvard Fliflet Bræin, composer and conductor
- Lalla Carlsen, singer and actress
- Henrik Hellstenius, composer and musicologist
- Trond Halstein Moe, opera singer
- Sophie Kauer, cellist and actress
- Turid Karlsen, soprano
- Øyvind Mæland, composer
- Arne Nordheim, composer
- Marcus Paus
- Rune Rebne, composer
- Leif Solberg, classical composer and organist
