= NorCD =

Norwegian record label

- Founded: 1991
- Founder: Karl Seglem
- Distributor(s): Musikkoperatørene
- Genre: Various
- Country of origin: Norway
- Location: Oslo
- Official website: norcd.mandalay.no

NorCD (established 1991 in Oslo, Norway) is a Norwegian record label for folk, jazz, world music and improvisational music, led by the founder saxophonist and composer Karl Seglem. NorCD is distributed through Musikkoperatørene, and is a member of FONO.

== Biography ==
In 1991 Karl Seglem decided to create a new free record label to distribute his music. The company soon enlisted a number of Norwegian performers in different genres. A derivation of the company was the label SOFA, which focused on the European improv, led by Ingar Zach and Ivar Grydeland. The NorCD catalog features 110 CD-titles (spring 2012) with many of the foremost Norwegian jazz and folk musicians. Most of the music is available on main digital platforms (download & streaming) in addition to traditional CD-format. The 10-year anniversary was celebrated in Blå in Oslo in 2001.

NorCD want to be a pool where different musical projects driven by musician and owner Karl Seglem in collaboration with other musicians and producers can fold out into CD releases, and keep up the important work for Norwegian music, as a true independent label. In 2011 Karl Seglem withdrew NorCD from Spotify and points to the Norwegian payment processing service WiMP, as the most convenient digital format.
