= 2015 in Nordic music =

The following is a list of notable events and releases that happened in Nordic music in 2015.

== Events ==
=== January ===
- 21 – The Bodø Jazz Open starts in Bodø, Norway (January 21–24).
- 23
  - Nordlysfestivalen opens in Tromsø, Norway (January 23 - February 1).
  - Norwegian folk singer Ragnar Olsen is awarded the Nordlysprisen 2015 at Nordlysfestivalen.

=== February ===
- 1 - The Danish National Chamber Orchestra, under its new name of Danmarks Underholdningsorkester, gives its first concert as a privately funded ensemble, at the Royal Academy of Music in Copenhagen.
- 5
  - The Ice Music Festival 2015 opens in Geilo, Norway (February 5–8).
  - The Polarjazz Festival 2015 starts in Longyearbyen (February 5–8).
- 6 – The annual Oslo Operaball takes place in Oslo.
- 7
  - The Dansk Melodi Grand Prix Final takes place in Aalborg. The winners are Anti Social Media, singing "The Way You Are"
  - The first semi-final of Sweden's Melodifestivalen takes place, with the next three semi-finals scheduled for February 14, 21, and 28.
  - The Uuden Musiikin Kilpailu 2015 Semi-finals begin in Finland. The next two semi-finals are scheduled for February 14 and 21.
- 28 - The Uuden Musiikin Kilpailu 2015 Final takes place.

=== March ===
- 4 – By:Larm 2015 opens in Oslo, Norway (March 4–7).
- 5 – The Oslo International Church Music Festival 2015 opens in Norway (March 5–15).
- 7 - Beatboxer Thorsen wins the final of Danmark har talent 2015.
- 24 – Ingrid Søfteland Neset wins the Royal Danish Academy of Music's soloist competition.
- 27 – Vossajazz opens in Voss, Norway (March 27–29).
- 28
  - Thea Hjelmeland is awarded the Vossajazz prize for her album Solar Plexus.
  - Live Maria Roggen performs the commissioned work Apukaluptein at Vossajazz.
- 31 – At the concert recorded in London, UK, by the BBC to celebrate the 60th anniversary of the Eurovision Song Contest, live performers and filmed performers include ABBA, Loreen and Herreys (Sweden), Bobbysocks and Wig Wam (Norway), Birthe Kjaer, Olsen Brothers and Emmelie de Forest (Denmark) and Lordi (Finland).

=== April ===
- 1 – The Inferno Metal Festival 2015 opens in Oslo (April 1–4).
- 23
  - SoddJazz opens in Inderøy Municipality, Nord-Trøndelag county, Norway (April 23–26).
  - The Nidaros Blues Festival 2015 opens in Trondheim, Norway (April 23–26).
- 25 – The Gamlestaden Jazzfestival opens in Gothenburg, Sweden (April 25 – May 2).
- 30
  - the Bergen Filharmoniske Orkester perform Beethoven's Symphony No. 9 in Grieghallen, Bergen, Norway.
  - In The Country, featuring Frida Ånnevik, play at Victoria - Nasjonal Jazzscene in Oslo.
  - Highasakite play at Sentrum Scene in Oslo.
  - Oslo Ess (with friends) play at the Brygga Kultursal in Halden, Norway.
  - The D'voice Festival 2015 opens in Songdalen Municipality, Norway (April 30 - May 1).
  - The Karmøygeddon Metal Festival 2015 opens in Karmøy Municipality, Norway (April 30 - May 3).

=== May ===
- 1
  - Denmark's 2015 Malko Competition for conductors announces Tung-Chieh Chuang as this year's winner.
  - Dave Holland Prism plays at Victoria - Nasjonal Jazzscene in Oslo.
  - Chris Thompson / Mads Eriksen Band + Elg play at Madam Felle in Bergen, Norway .
- 5 – MaiJazz 2015 opens in Stavanger, Norway (May 5 – 10).
- 6 – AnJazz 2015 opens in Hamar, Norway (May 6 – 9).
- 7 - The Trondheim Jazz Festival 2015 opens in Trondheim, Norway (May 7–10).
- 9 – Iver Kleive's Requiem is performed in Røros Church, Norway.
- 10 – Kampenjazz: Anja Eline Skybakmoen played at Cafeteatret Oslo.
- 15
  - Jan Erik Mikalsen wins the general category of the International Rostrum of Composers for the composition Songs for Orchestra.
  - Per Mathisen Trio plays at Victoria - National Jazz Scene in Oslo.
- 23 - Måns Zelmerlöw wins the Eurovision Song Contest 2015 for Sweden with his song "Heroes". It goes on to top the charts in Sweden, Greece, Iceland and Poland.
- 27 – Festspillene i Bergen 2015 opens in Bergen, Norway (May 27 – June 10).
- 28
  - Nattjazz opens in Bergen (May 28 – June 6).
  - Bergen Big Band become the first recipients of the Olav Dale Memorial Award.

=== June ===
- 4 - The Malmö Live venue is officially inaugurated in Sweden; it becomes the new home of the Malmö Symphony Orchestra.
- 10
  - The Norwegian Wood festival 2015 opens in Oslo, Norway (June 10–13).
  - Opera Østfold 2015 opens in Halden (June 10–13).
- 11 – Bergenfest 2015 opens in Bergen, Norway (June 11 – 14).
- 15 – Grieg in Bergen 2015 opens in Bergen, Norway (June 15 – August 22).
- 21 – Hardanger Music Festival 2015 opens in Ullensvang Municipality, Norway (June 21 – 25).
- 23 – The Risør Festival of Chamber Music 2015 opens in Risør, Norway (June 23–28).
- 27 - The Roskilde Festival opens in Denmark, with a line-up including Muse, Florence and the Machine and Pharrell Williams.

=== July ===
- 1
  - The Kongsberg Jazzfestival 2015 opens in Kongsberg, Norway (July 1–4).
  - Ellen Andrea Wang is the recipient of the Kongsberg Jazz Award or DNB.prisen 2015 at the Kongsberg Jazzfestival.
  - Vinstra Music Festival 2015 opens in Vinstra, Norway (July 1 – 5).
  - Førde International Folk Music Festival 2015 opens in Førde, Norway (July 1 – 5).
- 2 – Stavernfestivalen 2015 opens in Stavern, Norway (July 2–4).
- 8 – Riddu Riđđu 2015 opens in Kåfjord Municipality, in Troms, Norway (July 8–12).
- 13 – Moldejazz 2015 opens in Molde, Norway, with Mats Gustafsson as artist in residence (July 13–18).
- 16
  - Jan Ole Otnæs receives the 2015 Molderosen at Moldejazz.
  - Grøn Koncert opens in Denmark, with acts including Lågsus and Turboweekend.
  - Bukta Festival 2015 opens in Tromsø (July 16–18).
  - The Malakoff 2015 opens in Nordfjordeid (July 16–18).
  - The Slottsfjell Festival 2015 opens in Tønsberg (July 16–18).
  - Vinjerock 2015 opens in Eidsbugarden, Jotunheimen (July 16–19).
- 22
  - Canal Street 2015 opens in Arendal (July 22–25).
  - Seljord Country Festival 2015 opens in Seljord Municipality, Norway (July 22 – 26).
- 28 – Olavsfestdagene 2015 opens in Trondheim (July 28 - August 2).
- 30
  - Raumarock 2015 opens in Åndalsnes, Norway (July 30 - August 1).
  - Notodden Blues Festival 2015 opens in Notodden, Norway (July 30 - August 2).

=== August ===
- 5
  - Sildajazz 2015 opens in Haugesund, Norway (August 5–9).
  - Varanger Festival 2015 opens in Vadsø, Norway (August 5–9). Arcane Station gives its first concert here.
- 6
  - The Telemark Festival 2015 opens in Bø i Telemark, Norway (August 6–9).
  - Hemnesjazz 2015 opens in Hemnesberget, Helgeland, Norway (August 6–9).
- 8 – The Kids in Jazz 2015 festival opens in Oslo as part of the Oslo Jazzfestival (August 8–12).
- 10 – Oslo Jazzfestival opens in Oslo (August 10–15).
- 11 – Øyafestivalen opens in Oslo (August 11–15). Stars include Anneli Drecker.
- 12 – Reykjavik Jazz Festival opens, celebrating its 25th anniversary.
- 15 – The Oslo Chamber Music Festival 2015 opens in Oslo (July 15–23).
- 21 – The Pstereo Festival 2015 opens in Trondheim, Norway (July 21–22).

=== September ===
- 3 - The Punktfestivalen 2015 opens in Kristiansand, Norway (September 3–5).
- 10 - The Ultima Oslo Contemporary Music Festival 2015 opens in Oslo (September 10–19).

=== October ===
- 12 - The 30th Stockholm International Composer Festival opens at the Stockholms Konserthus, focusing on the work of Lili and Nadia Boulanger.
- 29 - Tampere Jazz Happening opens in Tampere, Finland (October 29 - November 1).

=== November ===
- 15 – DølaJazz 2015 opens in Lillehammer, Norway (October 15–18).
- 22 – The Insomnia Festival opens in Tromsø, Norway (October 22–25).
- 28 – The Ekkofestival opens in Bergen, Norway (October 28 - November 1).

=== December ===
- 11 - 27-year-old Martin Almgren wins the final of Sweden's Idol series.
- 15 - The 2015 Southern Norwegian jazz center award is presented to Hilde Hefte.
- 29 – RIBBEjazz 2015 - a one-day festival - takes place in Lillestrøm, Norway.

== Albums released ==
=== January ===
- 30 – Pinball by Sweden's Marius Neset, with Ivo Neame, Petter Eldh and Anton Eger (ACT Music).

=== February ===
- 16 – Lighthouse X by Lighthouse X
- 17
  - Gefion by Danish guitarist Jakob Bro (ECM Records).
  - Picture You by Swedish band The Amazing, with guitarist Reine Fiske (Partisan Records).

=== March ===
- 6 – Trees Of Light by Sweden's Anders Jormin / Lena Willemark / Karin Nakagawa (ECM Records).
- 22 – Hit The Wall! by Sweden's Mats Gustafsson, with Thurston Moore (Smalltown Superjazzz).
- 31 – Didn't You, My Dear? by Finland's Janita ( ECR Music Group).

=== April ===
- 17 - Shadowmaker by Apocalyptica (Better Noise/Eleven Seven Music).

=== May ===
- 19 - Firehouse by Gard Nilssen's Acoustic Unity including Petter Eldh and André Roligheten (Clean Feed).
- 26 - Skin Trade: Original Motion Picture Soundtrack by Jacob Groth (MovieScore Media)

=== June ===
- 8 – Beneath the Skin by Of Monsters and Men
- 16 – Lukas Graham (The Blue Album) by Lukas Graham

=== August ===
- 7 – Love Is Free by Robyn & La Bagatelle Magique
- 21 – Silver Mountain by Elephant9 with Reine Fiske (Rune Grammofon).
- 28 - Just The Two Of Us by Cæcilie Norby and Lars Danielsson (ACT Music).

=== October ===
- 2 – No Sound from the Outside by Saybia ( V2 Records Holland).
- 9 – Yhdessä by Robin Packalen (Universal Music Oy).
- 23
  - In Case of Fire by Fredrik Lundin (Yellowbird).
  - Redo Att Gå Sönder by Bo Kaspers Orkester (Columbia).

=== November ===
- 27 – Melt by Brian Chippendale / Mats Gustafsson / Massimo Pupillo (Trost Records).

== Eurovision Song Contest ==
- Denmark in the Eurovision Song Contest 2015
- Finland in the Eurovision Song Contest 2015
- Iceland in the Eurovision Song Contest 2015
- Norway in the Eurovision Song Contest 2015
- Sweden in the Eurovision Song Contest 2015

== Classical works ==
- Hans Abrahamsen – Left, alone
- Magnus Lindberg – Violin Concerto No. 2
- Kaija Saariaho – Trans

== Deaths ==
- 27 January – Ebbe Grims-land, Swedish viola and mandolin player and composer, 99 (born 1915)
- 22 February – Erik Amundsen, Norwegian jazz bassist, 78
- 21 March – Jørgen Ingmann, Danish jazz and pop guitarist, 89
- 14 July – Gerd Gudding, Norwegian musician and entertainer, 63
- 23 August – Per Hjort Albertsen, Norwegian composer, 96
- 30 August – Natalia Strelchenko, Russian-born Norwegian concert pianist, 38 (suspected murder)
- 5 November – Nora Brockstedt, Norwegian singer, 92
- 23 November - Jouni Kaipainen, Finnish composer, 58
- 25 November – Svein Christiansen, Norwegian jazz drummer, 74
- 22 December - Peter Lundblad, Swedish singer ("Ta mig till havet"), 65 (prostate cancer)
