= 2015 in Norwegian music =

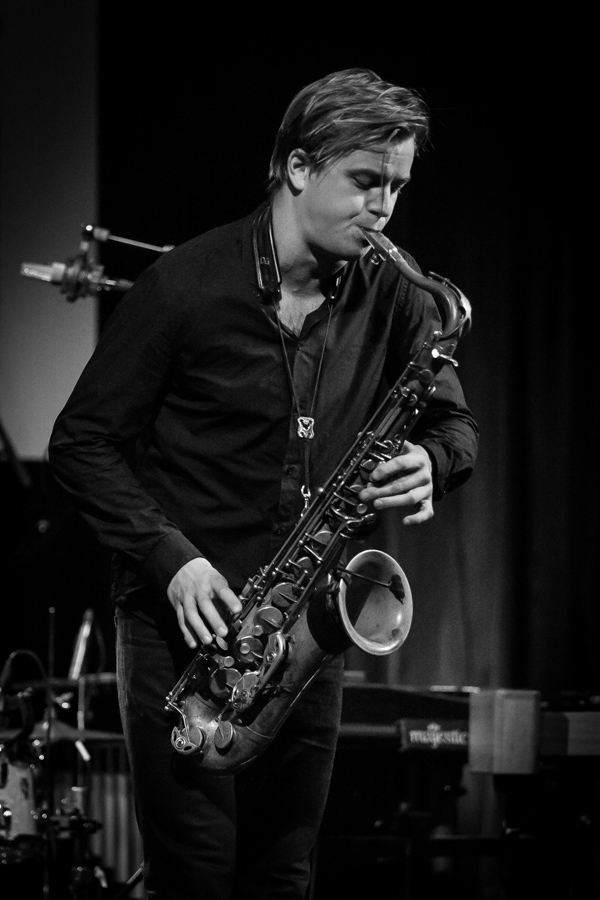
Marius Neset during the Oslo Jazzfestival at Victoria, Oslo, August 2015.

The following is a list of notable events and releases of the year 2015 in Norwegian music.

== Events ==
=== January ===
- 21 – Bodø Jazz Open started in Bodø (January 21–24).
- 23
  - Nordlysfestivalen started in Tromsø (January 23 – February 1).
  - Ragnar Olsen, (folk singer) was awarded the Nordlysprisen 2015 at Nordlysfestivalen.
- 29 – Kristiansund Opera Festival (Operafestukene) 2015 started in Kristiansund (January 29 – February 7).

=== February ===
- 5
  - Ice Music Festival 2015 started in Geilo (February 5–8).
  - The Polarjazz Festival 2015 starts in Longyearbyen (February 5–8).
- 6 – Oslo Operaball 2015 was arranged in Oslo.

=== March ===
- 4 – By:Larm 2015 started in Oslo (March 4–7).
- 5 – Oslo International Church Music Festival 2015 started in Oslo (March 5–15).
- 6 – Narvik Winter Festival started (March 6 – 15).
- 24 – Ingrid Søfteland Neset was the winner of this years soloist competition awarded by The Royal Danish Academy of Music.
- 27 – Vossajazz started in Voss (March 27–29).
- 28
  - Thea Hjelmeland was awarded Vossajazzprisen 2015 for the album Solar Plexus.
  - Live Maria Roggen performs the commissioned work Apukaluptein at Vossajazz.

=== April ===
- 1 – Inferno Metal Festival 2015 started in Oslo (April 1–4).
- 23
  - SoddJazz started in Inderøy Municipality in Nord-Trøndelag (April 23–26).
  - Nidaros Blues Festival 2015 started in Trondheim (April 23–26).
- 30
  - Bergen Filharmoniske Orkester performed Symphony No. 9 (Beethoven) in Grieghallen, Bergen.
  - In The Country featuring Frida Ånnevik played at Victoria – Nasjonal Jazzscene in Oslo.
  - Highasakite played at Sentrum Scene in Oslo.
  - Oslo Ess (with friends) played at the Brygga Kultursal in Halden.
  - The D'voice Festival 2015 started in Songdalen Municipality (April 30 – May 1).
  - Karmøygeddon Metal Festival 2015 started in Karmøy Municipality (April 30 – May 3).

=== May ===
- 1
  - Dave Holland Prism played at Victoria – Nasjonal Jazzscene in Oslo.
  - Chris Thompson / Mads Eriksen Band + Elg played at Madam Felle in Bergen.
- 2
  - Frode Kjekstad Trio played at Herr Nilsen Concert pub in Oslo.
  - Kvelertak played at Jevnakerhallen in Jevnaker Municipality.
- 5 – MaiJazz 2015 started in Stavanger (May 5 – 10).
- 6 – AnJazz 2015 started in Hamar (May 6 – 9).
- 7
  - Julie Dahle Aagård played at Uhørt in Oslo.
  - Lisa Ekdahl play at Rockefeller in Oslo.
  - Bergen Big Band with Gabriel Fliflet and Ole Hamre played at Sardinen USF in Bergen.
  - Trondheim Jazz Festival 2015 started in Trondheim (May 7–10).
- 8
  - Per Mathisen Trio played at Draaben Bar in Sandefjord.
  - Hanna Paulsberg Concept / Soil Collectors / MOPO played at Victoria – Nasjonal Jazzscene Oslo.
- 9 – Iver Kleive played Requiem in Røros Church.
- 10 – Kampenjazz: Anja Eline Skybakmoen played at Cafeteatret Oslo.
- 15
  - Jan Erik Mikalsen won the International Rostrum of Composers in the general category for the composition Songs for Orchestra.
  - Per Mathisen Trio played at Victoria – National Jazz Scene in Oslo.
- 16 – Farmers Market played at Victoria – National Jazz Scene in Oslo.
- 22 – Eivind Opsvik Overseas played at Victoria – National Jazz Scene in Oslo.
- 23 – Beady Belle played at Victoria – National Jazz Scene in Oslo.
- 27 – Festspillene i Bergen 2015 started (May 27 – June 10).
- 28
  - Nattjazz started in Bergen (May 28 – June 6).
  - Bergen Big Band was the very first recipients of Olav Dale's Memorial Award at the opening of Nattjazz 2015.

=== June ===
- 10
  - Norwegian Wood 2015 started in Oslo, Norway (June 10–13).
  - Opera Østfold 2015 started in Halden (June 10–13).
- 11 – Bergenfest 2015 started in Bergen, Norway (June 11 – 14).
- 15 – Grieg in Bergen 2015 started in Bergen, Norway (June 15 – August 22).
- 21 – Hardanger Music Festival 2015 started in Ullensvang Municipality (June 21 – 25).
- 23 – Risør Festival of Chamber Music 2015 started in Risør (June 23–28).

=== July ===
- 1
  - Kongsberg Jazzfestival 2015 started in Kongsberg (July 1–4).
  - Ellen Andrea Wang was recipient of the Kongsberg Jazz Award or DNB.prisen 2015 at the Kongsberg Jazzfestival.
  - Vinstra Music Festival 2015 started in Vinstra (July 1 – 5).
  - Førde International Folk Music Festival 2015 started in Førde (July 1 – 5).
- 2 – Stavernfestivalen 2015 started in Stavern (July 2–4).
- 8 – Riddu Riđđu 2015 started in Kåfjord Municipality in Troms (July 8–12).
- 13 – Moldejazz 2015 started in Molde with Mats Gustafsson as artist in residence (July 13–18).
- 16
  - Jan Ole Otnæs received the 2015 Molderosen at Moldejazz.
  - Bukta Festival 2015 started in Tromsø (July 16–18).
  - The Malakoff 2015 started in Nordfjordeid (July 16–18).
  - The Slottsfjell Festival 2015 started in Tønsberg (July 16–18).
  - Vinjerock 2015 started in Eidsbugarden, Jotunheimen (July 16–19).
- 22
  - Canal Street 2015 started in Arendal (July 22–25).
  - Seljord Country Festival 2015 started in Seljord Municipality (July 22 – 26).
- 28 – Olavsfestdagene 2015 started in Trondheim (July 28 – August 2).
- 30
  - Raumarock 2015 started in Åndalsnes (July 30 – August 1).
  - The 28th Notodden Blues Festival (2015) started in Notodden (July 30 – August 2).

=== August ===
- 5
  - Sildajazz 2015 started in Haugesund (August 5–9).
  - Varanger Festival 2015 started in Vadsø (August 5–9). Arcane Station will have his debut concert here.
- 6
  - Telemark Festival 2015 started in Bø i Telemark (August 6–9).
  - Hemnesjazz 2015 started in Hemnesberget, Helgeland (August 6–9).
- 8 – The Kids in Jazz 2015 festival started in Oslo as part of the Oslo Jazzfestival (August 8–12).
- 10 – Oslo Jazzfestival started in Oslo (August 10–15).
- 11 – Øyafestivalen started in Oslo (August 11–15).
- 12 – Anneli Drecker played at Øyafestivalen.
- 15 – Oslo Chamber Music Festival 2015 started in Oslo (July 15–23).
- 21 – Pstereo Festival 2015 started in Trondheim (July 21–22).

=== September ===
- 3 – Punktfestivalen 2015 started in Kristiansand (September 3–5).
- 10 – Ultima Oslo Contemporary Music Festival 2015 started in Oslo (September 10–19).
- 20 – Trondheim Chamber Music Festival 2015 started in Trondheim (July 20–27).

=== October ===
- 15 – DølaJazz 2015 started in Lillehammer (October 15–18).
- 22 – The Insomnia Festival started in Tromsø (October 22–25).
- 28 – The Ekkofestival started in Bergen (October 28 – November 1).

=== November ===
- 11 – The Vardø Blues Festival (Blues i Vintermørket) started (November 11 – 15).
- 25 – The 10th Barents Jazz, Tromsø International Jazz Festival started (November 25 – 29).

=== December ===
- 11 – The Nobel Peace Prize Concert was held at Telenor Arena.
- 15 – 2015 Southern Norwegian jazz center award received by Hilde Hefte.
- 29 – RIBBEjazz 2015 – a one-day festival in Lillestrøm.

== Albums released ==
=== January ===
Day	Album	Artist	Label	Notes	Ref.
15	Many Years To Go	Erik Moll	EMM Records		
20	Meditation	Terje Isungset	All Ice Records		
21	Nangijala	Andreas Loven	Losen Records		
30	Pinball	Marius Neset	ACT Music	Produced by Marius Neset and Anton Eger	
30	Bits & Pieces	Mopti feat. Bendik Baksaas	Jazzland Recordings	Produced by Bendik Baksaas, Christian M. Svendsen, Aleksander Sjølie, Harald Lassen	
30	Opp De Nye Blanke	Honningbarna	Nye Blanke		

=== February ===
Day	Album	Artist	Label	Notes	Ref.
6	The Half-finished Heaven	Sinikka Langeland	ECM Records	Produced by Manfred Eicher	
16	Ten Love Songs	Susanne Sundfør	Warner Music Group		
20	It´s OK To Play	Øystein Blix	Losen Records		
27	Midwest	Mathias Eick	ECM Records	Produced by Manfred Eicher	

=== March ===
Day	Album	Artist	Label	Notes	Ref.
20	Grieg, Tveitt & I	Dag Arnesen	Coco & Co		
23	Lucidity	Atomic	Jazzland Recordings	Produced by Atomic, co-producer Sten Nilsen	
27	Kjølvatn	Nils Økland Band including Rolf-Erik Nystrøm, Sigbjørn Apeland and Mats Eilertsen	ECM Records		
27	Slow Eastbound Train	Daniel Herskedal	Edition Records	Produced by Erik Johannessen	

=== April ===
Day	Album	Artist	Label	Notes	Ref.
7	Vol. 3	Team Hegdal	Particular Recordings		
17	Én	Duplex	NorCD		
17	En Konsert For Folk Flest	Motorpsycho + Ståle Storløkken	Rune Grammofon		
24	Rocks & Straws	Anneli Drecker, lyrics based on poems by Arvid Hanssen	Rune Grammofon		
24	Slow Snow	Tore Brunborg	ACT Music	Produced by Tore Brunborg	

=== May ===
Day	Album	Artist	Label	Notes	Ref.
1	Terje Isungset & Stian Westerhus	Terje Isungset, Stian Westerhus	All Ice Records		
9	Ospitalita Generosa	Per Mathiesen Trio	Alessa Records		
15	The Goldilocks Zone	Olga Konkova Trio	Losen Records		
19	Firehouse	Gard Nilssen's Acoustic Unity including with Petter Eldh and André Roligheten	Clean Feed		
22	Savages	Trondheim Jazz Orchestra & Kristoffer Lo	MNJ Records		

=== June ===
Day	Album	Artist	Label	Notes	Ref.
1	Starfire	Jaga Jazzist	Ninja Tune		
3	Weathering	Kvien & Sommer	Full Of Nothing		
5	Rainy Omen	Finland (Morten Qvenild, Ivar Grydeland, Jo Berger Myhre, Pål Hausken)	Hubro Music		

=== July ===
Day	Album	Artist	Label	Notes	Ref.
21	Bugge & Friends	Bugge Wesseltoft	Jazzland Recordings		
24	Tears Of The World	Knut Reiersrud & Mighty Sam McClain	ACT Music	Produced by Knut Reiersrud and Nikolai Hængsle Eilertsen	

=== August ===
Day	Album	Artist	Label	Notes	Ref.
11	Individuals Facing The Terror Of Cosmic Loneliness	Stein Urheim and Mari Kvien Brunvoll	Jazzland Recordings		
21	Silver Mountain	Elephant9	Rune Grammofon		
21	Vårres Egen Lille Krig	Vidar Vang	VV Records		
28	Bridges	Adam Baldych & Helge Lien Trio	ACT Music	Mixed and mastered by Klaus Scheuermann	

=== September ===
Day	Album	Artist	Label	Notes	Ref.
4	Personal Piano	Morten Qvenild	Hubro Music		
6	Ville Ord	Frida Ånnevik	Grappa Music	Recipient of the Spellemannprisen lyricist award	
11	When You Cut Into The Present	Møster!	Hubro Records		
18	Echo	Anja Eline Skybakmoen	Triogram		
18	Megalodon	Megalodon Collective including with Henrik Lødøen	Gigafon		
18	Waldemar 4	Trygve Waldemar Fiske	Gigafon		
25	Circadian Rhythm And Blues	Hayden Powell	Periskop Records		
25	Mønster	Espen Berg Trio	Atterklang	Produced by Espen Berg Trio. AKLANG314	

=== October ===
Day	Album	Artist	Label	Notes	Ref.
8	JazzBukkBox a box with three albums: Lærad The Tree, Live In Germany and WorldJazz	Karl Seglem	NorCD		
9	Band Of Gold	Band Of Gold including Nikolai Hængsle Eilertsen and Nina Elisabeth Mortvedt	Jansen Plateproduksjon	Produced by Siggi Loch	
12	Golden Years	Pixel	Cuneiform Records		
30	Mette Henriette	Mette Henriette	ECM Records		
31	Cubistic Boogie	David Arthur Skinner	Losen Records	Produced by David Arthur Skinner, executive producer Odd Gjelsnes	

=== November ===
Day	Album	Artist	Label	Notes	Ref.
6	This Is Not A Miracle	Food	ECM Records		
12	Aimless Mary	Needlepoint	BJK Music		
20	Pieces Of Solitude	Natalie Sandtorv	Va Fongool		
20	Trail of Souls	Solveig Slettahjell with Knut Reiersrud and In The Country	ACT Music		
27	Time Is Coming	Hildegunn Øiseth with Espen Berg, Mats Eilertsen, and Per Oddvar Johansen	Losen Records		

=== December ===
Day	Album	Artist	Label	Notes	Ref.
1	Before the Storm	Nakama	Nakama Records	Produced by Nakama & Christian Obermayer	

=== Unknown date ===
#

K – Tenor Battle by Håkon Kornstad (Jazzland Recordings)

== New Artists ==
- AURORA with her debut album Running with the Wolves (Decca Records), awarded Spellemannprisen in the category This year's newcomer and Gramo scholarship.

== Deaths ==
February

- 22 – Erik Amundsen, jazz bassist (born 1937).

May

- 20 – Simon Flem Devold, jazz clarinetist and columnist (born 1929).
- 23 – Liv Marit Wedvik, country singer (born 1970).

July

- 14 – Gerd Gudding, traditional folk musician and entertainer (born 1951).

August

- 12 – Per Hjort Albertsen, contemporary classical composer (born 1919).
- 30 – Natalia Strelchenko, Russian born Norwegian classical concert pianist (born 1976).

November

- 5 – Nora Brockstedt, jazz and pop music singer (born 1923).
- 20 – Ketil Vea, contemporary classical composer and music teacher (born 1932).
- 25 – Svein Christiansen, jazz drummer (born 1941).

December

- 16 – Jostein Eriksen, opera singer (born 1926).
- 26 – Tore Andersen, country musician (born 1960).

== Seed also ==
- Music of Norway
- 2015 in Norway
- Norway in the Eurovision Song Contest 2015
- Spellemannprisen
- Buddyprisen
- Nordlysprisen
- Edvard Grieg Memorial Award
- Thorgeir Stubø Memorial Award
- Rolf Gammleng Memorial Award
- Radka Toneff Memorial Award
