= 2016 in Norwegian music =

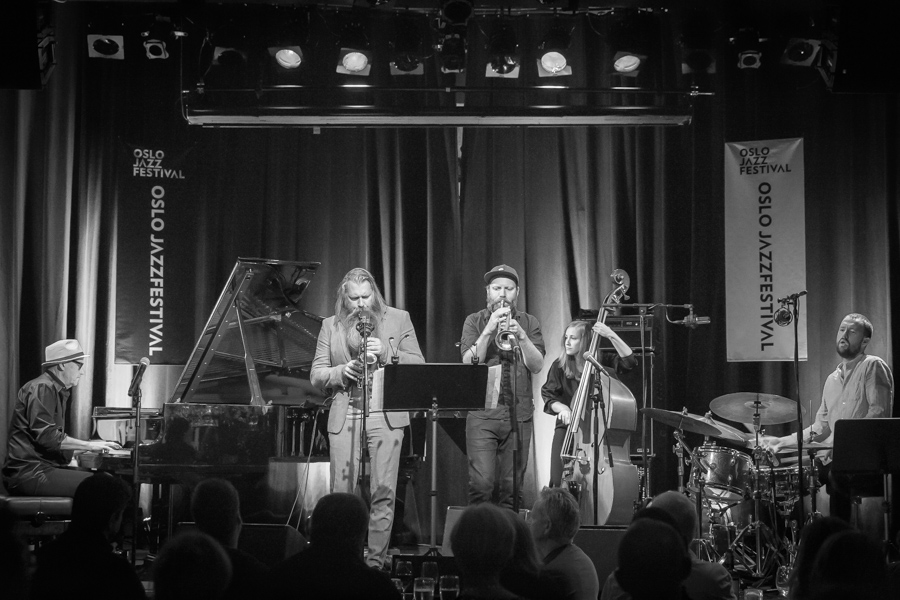
The Oslo Jazz Festival Orchestra, comprising Jon Balke, Trygve Seim, Mathias Eick, Ellen Andrea Wang, and Gard Nilssen, during the Oslo Jazzfestival at Victoria, Oslo, August 2016.

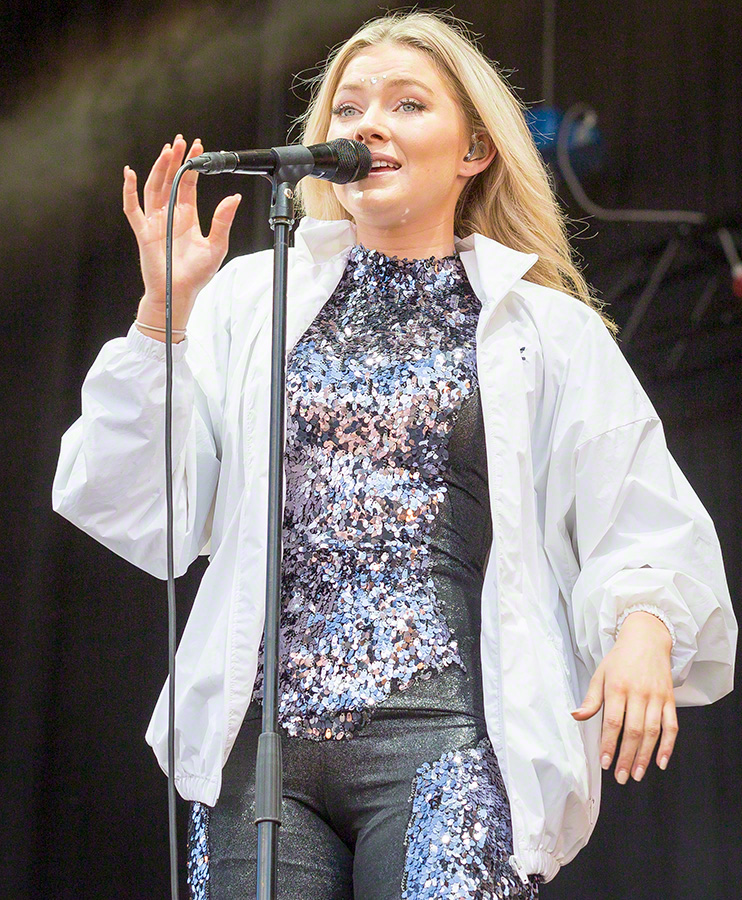
Astrid S at Stavernfestivalen.

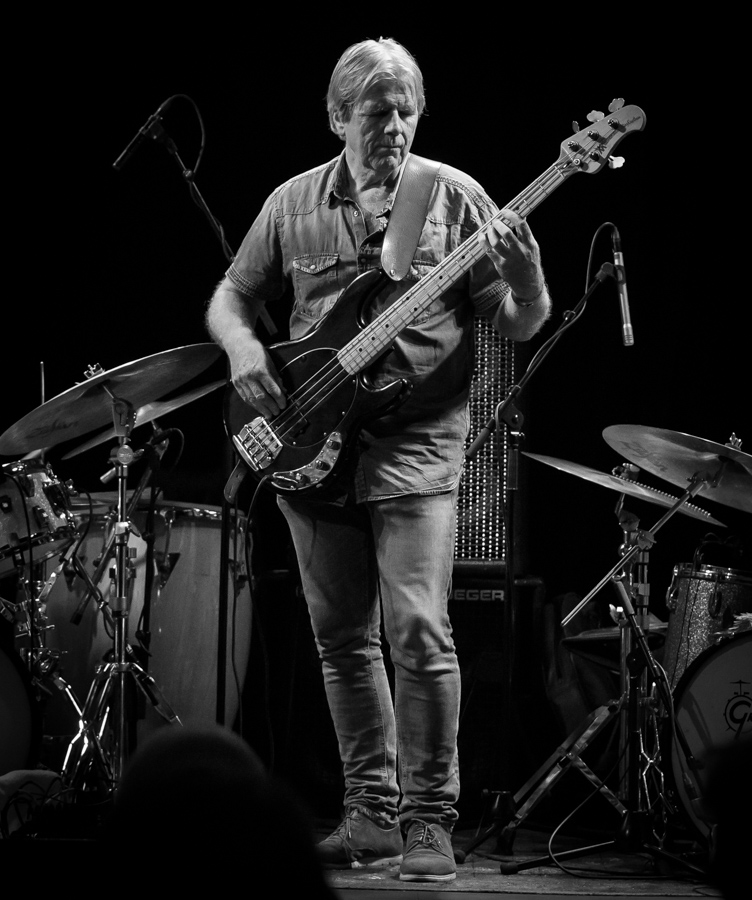
Edvard Askeland with Cutting Edge during the Oslo Jazzfestival at Victoria, Oslo, August 2016.

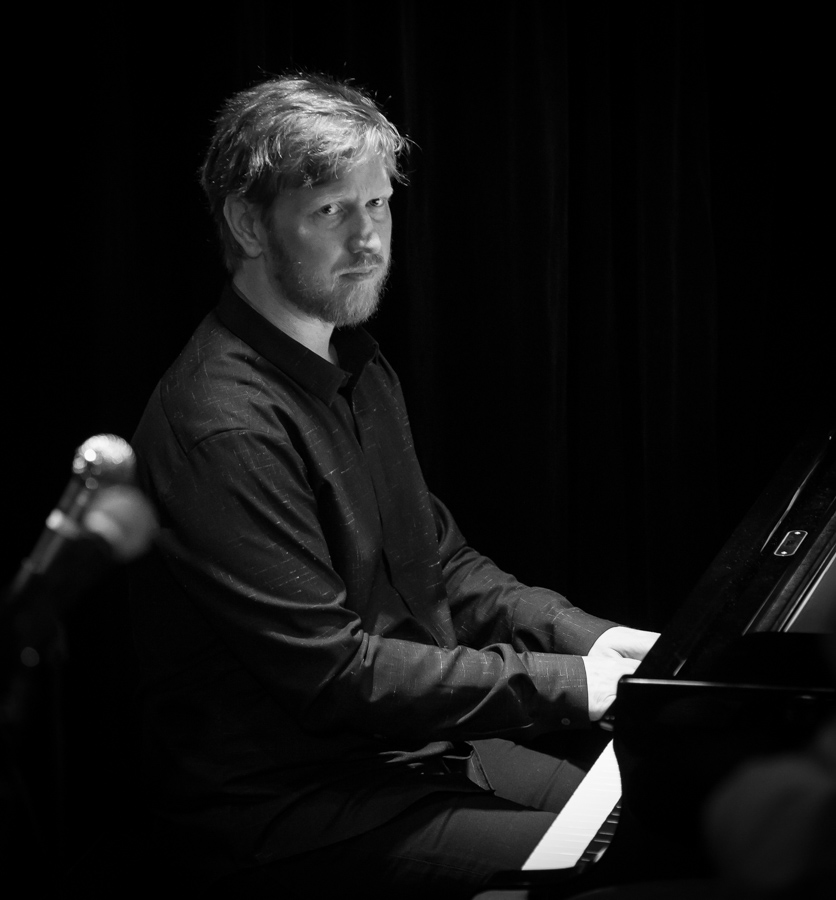
Helge Lien with Per Husby Dedications Orchestra during the Oslo Jazzfestival at Victoria, Oslo, August 2016.

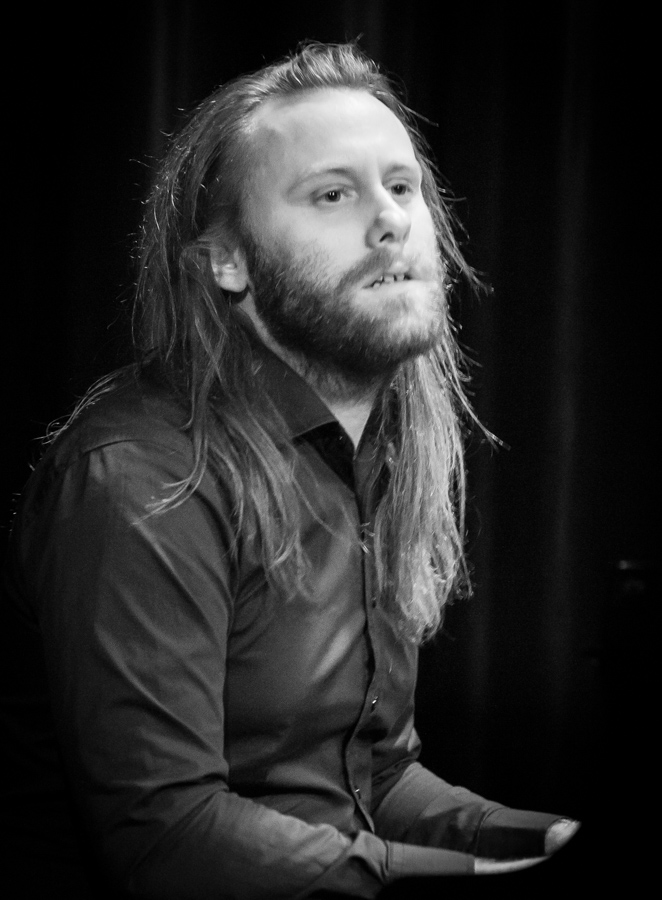
Andreas Ulvo during the Oslo Jazzfestival at Victoria, Oslo, August 2016.

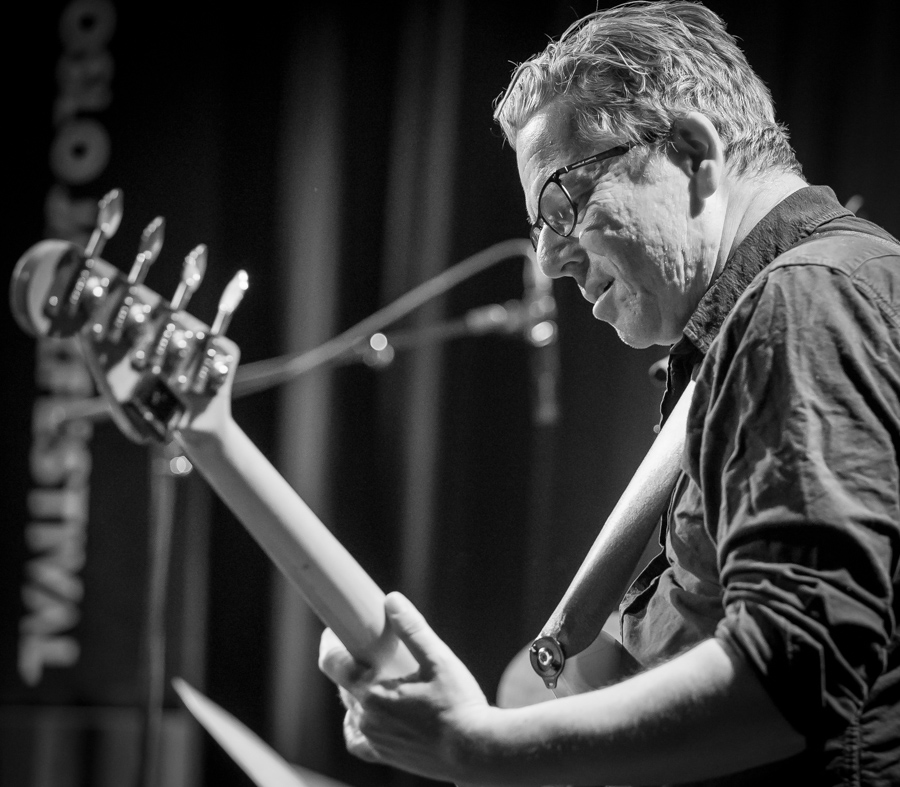
Audun Erlien during the Oslo Jazzfestival at Victoria, Oslo, August 2016.

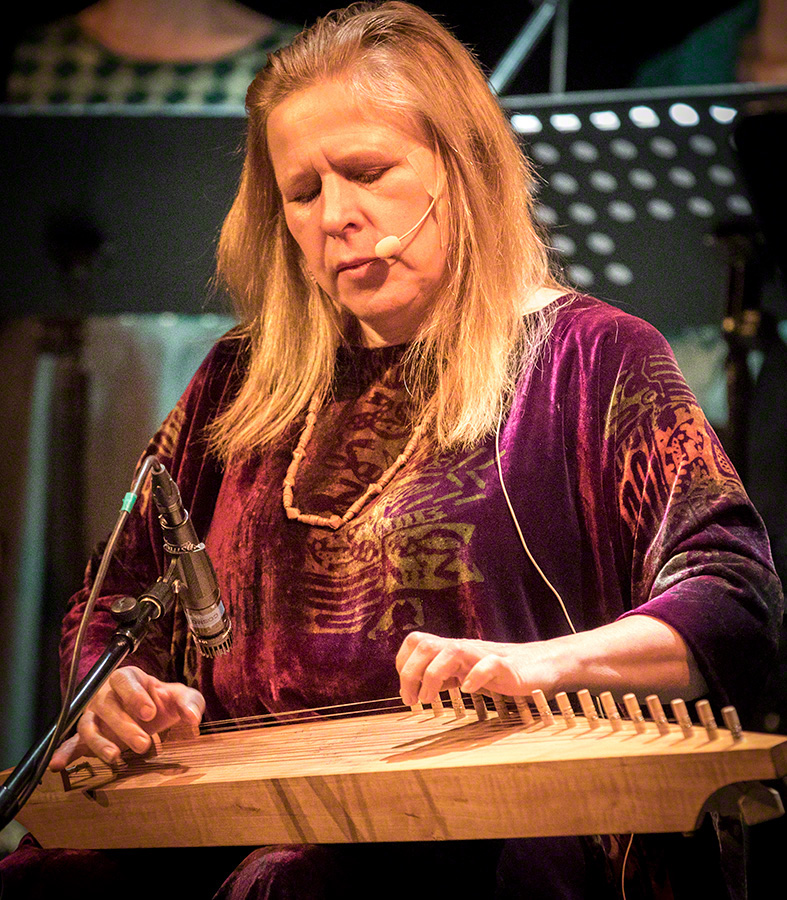
Sinikka Langeland at Cosmopolite, Oslo, October 2016.

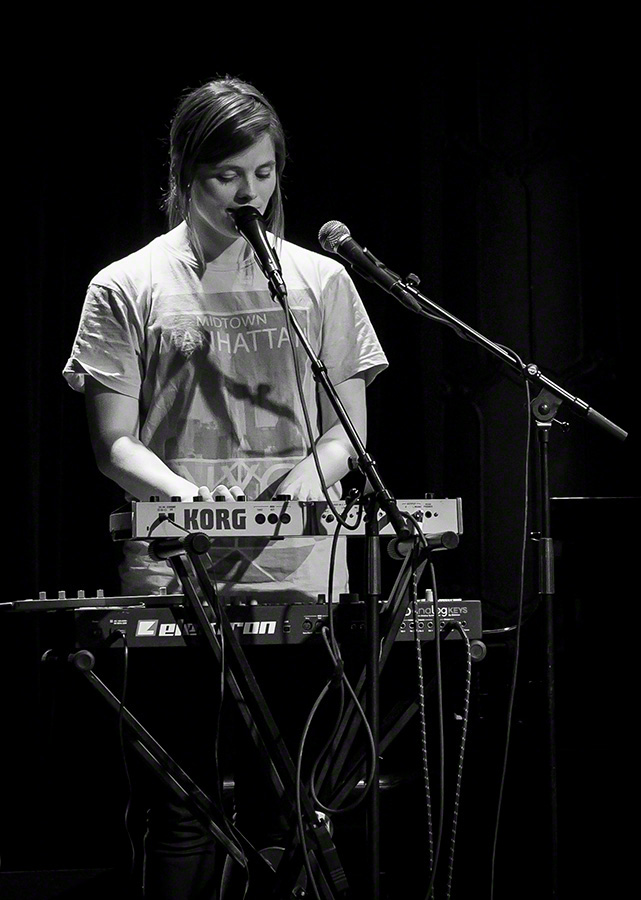
Anja Lauvdal at Victoria, Oslo, October 2016.

The following is a list of notable events and releases of the year 2016 in Norwegian music.

== Events ==
=== January ===
- 21 – Ice Music Festival started in Geilo (January 21–24).
- 27 – Bodø Jazz Open started in Bodø (January 27–30).
- 29 – Nordlysfestivalen started in Tromsø (January 29 – February 7).

=== February ===
- 4
  - The Polarjazz Festival 2016 started in Longyearbyen (February 4–7).
  - Kristiansund Opera Festival opened (February 4–20).
- 5 – Knut Kristiansen and Bergen Big Band's release concert for the album Kuria Suite at Verftet in Bergen.
- 7 – Oslo Operaball was arranged in Oslo (February 7).
- 16 – Andreas Loven's release concert for the album District Six (Losen Records) at Victoria – National Jazz Scene in Oslo.
- 17 – Uhørt! – Sund jazz program on tour at Victoria – National Jazz Scene in Oslo.
- 27 – The 54th edition of the Norwegian national Melodi Grand Prix final will select Norway's entry for the Eurovision Song Contest 2016.

=== March ===
- 2 – The By:Larm started in Oslo (March 2–5).
- 3
  - Frode Alnæs' release concert for the album Kanestrøm (Øra Fonogram) at Victoria – National Jazz Scene in Oslo.
  - Vinterjazzfestivalen started in Fredrikstad (March 3–6).
  - Oslo International Church Music Festival 2016 opened in Oslo (March 3–13).
- 4 – Narvik Winter Festival started (March 4–13).
- 18 – Vossajazz started in Voss (March 18–20).
- 19
  - Øyvind Skarbø was awarded the 2016 Vossajazzprisen.
  - Nils Økland performs Glødetrådar, the commissioned work for Vossajazz 2016.
- 23 – Inferno Metal Festival 2016 started in Oslo (March 23–26).

=== April ===
- 21 – Nidaros Blues Festival opened in Trondheim (April 21–24).
- 22 – SoddJazz started in Inderøy Municipality, Nord-Trøndelag (April 22–26).
- 28 – Karmøygeddon Metal Festival started in Karmøy Municipality (April 28–30).

=== May ===
- 2 – Trondheim Jazz Festival started (May 2 – 12).
- 3 – MaiJazz 2016 started in Stavanger (May 3 – 7).
- 4 – AnJazz the Hamar Jazz Festival started at Hamar (May 4 – 7).
- 25 – The Festspillene i Bergen 2016 started (May 25 – June 8).
- 26 – The Nattjazz 2016 started in Bergen (May 26 – June 3).

=== June ===
- 2 – Christian Grøvlen is awarded the Robert Levins Pianistpris, a memorial prize, in Oslo by Mona Levin.
- 15 – Bergenfest 2016 with headliner Sigur Rós (June 15 – 18).

=== July ===
- 6
  - Kongsberg Jazzfestival 2016 opened with Pat Metheny consert (August 6 – 9).
  - Susanna Wallumrød was recipient of the Kongsberg Jazz Award or DNB.prisen 2016 at the Kongsberg Jazzfestival.
- 18 – Moldejazz 2016 started with Ola Kvernberg as artist in residence (August 18 – 23).

=== August ===
- 3 – The 29th Notodden Blues Festival start in Notodden (August 3–7).
- 4 – The 22nd Hemnesjazz started in Hemnesberget ( August 4–7).
- 9 – The 18th Øyafestivalen started in Oslo ( August 9–13).
- 10
  - The 5th Kids in Jazz festival started in Oslo as part of the Oslo Jazzfestival (August 10–14).
  - The 30th Sildajazz started in Haugesund (August 10–16).
- 11 – The Tromsø Jazz Festival started in Tromsø (August 11 – 14).
- 14 – The 31st Oslo Jazzfestival started in Oslo with opening concert by Jan Garbarek Group featuring Trilok Gurtu (August 14 – 20).

=== September ===
- 4 – The 11th Punktfestivalen started in Kristiansand ( September 4–6).

=== October ===
- 13 – The 33rd DølaJazz started in Lillehammer ( October 13–16).

=== November ===
- 9 – The Vardø Blues Festival (Blues i Vintermørket) started (November 9 – 13).

=== December ===
- 11 – The Nobel Peace Prize Concert was held at Telenor Arena.
- 29 – The 11th RIBBEjazz starts in Lillestrøm.

== Albums released ==
=== January ===
Day	Album	Artist	Label	Notes	Ref.
22	Abbath	Abbath	Season of Mist		
22	Klangkammer 2	Stian Omenås	NorCD	Executive producer Karl Seglem	
29	Momento	Ayumi Tanaka Trio	AMP Records		
29	What Was Said	Tord Gustavsen, Simin Tander, Jarle Vespestad	ECM	Produced by Manfred Eicher	

=== February ===
Day	Album	Artist	Label	Notes	Ref.
5	Kuria Suite	Knut Kristiansen and Bergen Big Band	Grappa		
11	District Six	Andreas Loven	Losen		
12	Warp	Jon Balke	ECM	Produced by Jon Balke and Manfred Eicher	
12	Here Be Monsters	Motorpsycho	Rune Grammofon	Produced by Bent Sæther	
14	Story Of I	Myrna	Tomtom & Braza		
19	Stifinner	Tone Hulbækmo	Heilo		
26	Eastern Smiles	Hanna Paulsberg Concept	ODIN		

=== March ===
Day	Album	Artist	Label	Notes	Ref.
3	Kanestrøm	Frode Alnæs	Øra Fonogram		
3	Opus 15, Sonatas and Variations for Guitar by Mauro Giuliani and Fernando Sor	Njål Vindenes	On It		
11	All My Demons Greeting Me as a Friend	Aurora	Decca, Glassnote		
11	Culturen	Skadedyr	Hubro Records	International release in May 2016	
25	Let’s Dance	Per Oddvar Johansen	Edition Records		
29	Ført Bak Lyset	Tusmørke	Svart Records, Blek Kopi	Produced by Benedikt Momrak, Kristoffer Momrak, Lars Fredrik Frøislie	
30	The Dance Upon My Grave	COKKO (Marte Eberson, Natalie Sandtorv, Ole Mofjell)	Playdate Records		

=== April ===
Day	Album	Artist	Label	Notes	Ref.
1	Bacteria Cult	Kaada/Patton	Ipecac Recordings	Produced by Kaada/Patton	
1	Joni Was Right	Marit Larsen	Håndbrygg Records	EP	
1	Ulv Ulv	Moskus	Hubro Records	Produced by Andreas Risanger Meland and Moskus. International release June 3, 2016.	
14	Multiverse	Anette Askvik	Bird Records		
15	Thick as Thieves	Mongrel – Thomas Litleskare, Ayumi Tanaka, Stian Andersen, Tore Flatjord	Losen Records		
22	Kem Som Kan Å Leve	Building Instrument – Mari Kvien Brunvoll, Åsmund Weltzien, Øyvind Hegg-Lunde	Hubro Records	Produced by Building Instrument, Jørgen Træen	
22	Triangle	Susanna	SusannaSonata	Produced by Susanna	
26	Reflections	Trondheim Soloists	2L Records	Produced by Lindberg Lyd AS	
29	Amputation	Stian Westerhus	House of Mythology		
29	Sun Blowing	Danielsson Neset Lund	ACT Music	Produced by Morten Lund & Lars Danielsson, executive producer Siggi Loch	

=== May ===
Day	Album	Artist	Label	Notes	Ref.
13	Nattesferd	Kvelertak	Roadrunner Records	Produces by Nick Terry	
13	Cloud Nine	Kygo	Sony, Ultra		
20	Camp Echo	Highasakite	Propeller Recordings	Produces by Kåre Vestrheim. Recipient of the pop music Spellemannprisen	
20	La Mascarade	Rolf Lislevand	ECM New Series – ECM 2288	Produces by Manfred Eicher	
27	Solitary Moon	Liv Stoveland	Ponca Jazz Records		

=== June ===
Day	Album	Artist	Label	Notes	Ref.
10	Wolf Valley	Eyolf Dale	Edition Records	Nominated for the jazz Spellemannprisen	
28	Now Is The Time	Spirit In The Dark (Audun Erlien, Anders Engen, David Wallumrød)	Jazzland Recordings	Produced by Spirit In The Dark	

=== July ===
Day	Album	Artist	Label	Notes	Ref.
9	Sounds Of 3	Per Mathisen Trio (including Frode Alnæs and Gergő Borlai)	Losen		
29	The Magical Forest	Sinikka Langeland	ECM	Produced by Manfred Eicher	
29	Rubicon	Mats Eilertsen	ECM	Produced by Manfred Eicher	

=== August ===
Day	Album	Artist	Label	Notes	Ref.
5	Apokaluptein	Live Maria Roggen	Kirkelig Kulturverksted	Produced by Live Maria Roggen	
19	Femte	Isglem	NorCD	Produced by Karl Seglem	
19	Norwegian Caravan	Come Shine – Kringkastingsorkesteret	Lawo Classics	Produced by Erlend Skomsvoll, Vegard Landaas. Nominated for the jazz Spellemannprisen	
26	Air	Frode Haltli with the Trondheim Soloists and Arditti Quartet	ECM	Executive producer Manfred Eicher	
26	Rumi Songs	Trygve Seim	ECM		
26	Snowmelt	Marius Neset	ACT	Produces by Marius Neset with Anton Eger	

=== September ===
Day	Album	Artist	Label	Notes	Ref.
2	Buoyancy	Nils Petter Molvær	Okeh Records	Produced by Jo Berger Myhre, Nils Petter Molvær	
2	Bushman's Fire	Bushman's Revenge	Rune Grammofon		
2	Jazz, Fritt Etter Hukommelsen	Bushman's Revenge	Rune Grammofon		
2	Salmeklang	Gjermund Larsen Trio	Heilo Records	Recipient of the composer Spellemannprisen	
4	Personal Piano	Morten Qvenild	Hubro		
9	Atmosphères	Tigran Hamasyan, Arve Henriksen, Eivind Aarset, and Jan Bang	ECM Records		
9	Changing Tides	Lukas Zabulionis	Curling Legs		
9	Grand White Silk	Torun Eriksen	Jazzland Recordings	Produced by Kjetil Dalland, Torun Eriksen	
9	Joni Was Right I & II	Marit Larsen	Håndbrygg Records	Produced by Marit Larsen	
11	Hommage À Eberhard Weber	Pat Metheny, Jan Garbarek, Gary Burton, Scott Colley, Danny Gottlieb, Paul McCandless, Michael Gibbs, Helge Sunde, and SWR Big Band	ECM		
11	When You Cut Into The Present	Møster!	Hubro		
16	Sunrain	Haakon Graf Trio, including Erik Smith and Per Mathisen	Losen Records	Produces by Graf, Smith, and Mathisen	
18	Echo	Anja Eline Skybakmoen	Triogram		
18	Megalodon	Megalodon Collective including with Henrik Lødøen	Gigafon		
18	Waldemar 4	Trygve Waldemar Fiske	Gigafon		
25	Circadian Rhythm And Blues	Hayden Powell	Periskop Records		
25	Mønster	Espen Berg Trio	Atterklang	Produced by Espen Berg Trio. AKLANG314	
30	Blood Bitch	Jenny Hval	Sacred Bones	Produced by Jenny Hval, Lasse Marhaug	
30	It’s Another Wor d	Sigrun Tara Øverland with Picidae	NorCD		
30	Somewhere In Between	Bugge Wesseltoft	Jazzland Recordings		

=== October ===
Day	Album	Artist	Label	Notes	Ref.
2	Time Is A Blind Guide	Thomas Strønen	ECM	Produced by Sun Chung, Thomas Strønen	
7	Gode Liv	Stein Torleif Bjella	Heime Med Hund Records		
7	Kurzsam and Fulger	Christian Wallumrød Ensemble	Hubro Music		
14	Rainbow Session	Harald Lassen	Hagen Recordings	Produced by Harald Lassen	
21	Her Bor	Frida Ånnevik	Grappa Music	Recipient of the folk Spellemannprisen	
31	No Right No Left	Andreas Wildhagen	Nakama Records		

=== November ===
Day	Album	Artist	Label	Notes	Ref.
11	December Songs	Olga Konkova and Jens Thoresen	Losen Records		
11	StaiStua	Ulvo / Hole / Haltli	NorCD	Produced by Andreas Ulvo, Musikk I Hedmark	
11	The Mechanical Fair	Ola Kvernberg	Olsen Records	2xLP produced by Todd Terje	
11	The Sleeping Gods/Thorn	Enslaved	Scion Audio/Visual	EP	
12	Stories	Jan Gunnar Hoff	2L	Solo piano	
14	Portrait With Hidden Face	Bjørn Kruse	LabLabel		
17	My Head Is Listening	Motif	Clean Feed	Produced by Motif	
19	3 Pianos	Tanaka/Lindvall/Wallumrød	Nakama Records		
22	Midt På Natta	Operasjon Hegge	Particular Recordings	P!8	
25	Vannmann86	Hjerteslag	Eget Selskap		

=== December ===
Day	Album	Artist	Label	Notes	Ref.
2	Puzzler	Hilma Nikolaisen	Fysisk Format	Indie rock	
16	New York City Magic	Per Mathisen, Utsi Zimring, and David Kikoski	Alessa Records		

== New Artists ==
- Aksel Rykkvin, boy soprano nominated for Spellemannprisen, and named "The Musician of the Year" during the national part of the Youth Music Championship 2016-2017.
- Astrid S, singer and recipient of the newcomer Spellemannprisen.

== Deaths ==
January

- 5 – Hanna-Marie Weydahl, classical pianist (born 1922).
- 25 – Leif Solberg, contemporary classical composer and organist (born 1914).

February

- 19 – Harald Devold, jazz saxophonist (born 1964).

March

- 11 – Kari Diesen Jr., entertainer (born 1939).

April

- 4 – Andris Snortheim, children's musician (born 1950).
- 24 – Jan Henrik Kayser, classical pianist (born 1933).

May

- 25 – Per Øien, classical flutist (born 1937).

June

- 8 – Terje Fjærn, jazz and pop music orchestra conductor, "La det swinge" (born 1942).
- 17 – Willy Andresen, jazz pianist and bandleader (born 1921).
- 18 – Sverre Kjelsberg, popular music singer and bassist (born 1946).

July

- 31 – Jon Klette, jazz saxophonist (born 1962).

August

- 10 – Per Müller, musician and singer (born 1932).
- 18 – Fred Nøddelund, jazz flugelhornist and band leader (born 1947).

September

- 9 – Knut Wiggen, contemporary classical composer (born 1927).
- 30 – Lilleba Lund Kvandal, opra singer (born 1940).

November

- 30 – Ivar Thomassen, traditional folk singer, songwriter, and jazz pianist (born 1954).

== See also ==
- 2016 in Norway
- Music of Norway
- Norway in the Eurovision Song Contest 2016
- Spellemannprisen
- Buddyprisen
- Nordlysprisen
- Edvard Grieg Memorial Award
- Thorgeir Stubø Memorial Award
- Rolf Gammleng Memorial Award
- Radka Toneff Memorial Award
