= 2019 in Norwegian music =

The following is a list of notable events and releases of the year 2019 in Norwegian music.

== Events ==
=== January ===
- 10 – The 18th All Ears festival started in Oslo (January 10 – 12).
- 19 – The Oslo Operaball was arranged in Oslo (February 19 – 20).
- 24 – The 38th annual Djangofestival started on Cosmopolite in Oslo, Norway (January 24–26).
- 25 – The 32nd Nordlysfestivalen started in Tromsø (January 25 – February 3).
- 29 – The Barokkfest started in Trondheim (January 29 – February 3).
- 31
  - The 8th Bodø Jazz Open Vinterjazz started in Bodø, Norway (January 31 – February 2).
  - The 21st Polarjazz Festival started in Longyearbyen, Svalbard (January 31 – February 3).

=== February ===
- 14 – The 14th Ice Music Festival starts in Geilo, Norway (February 14–16).
- 20 – The Hemsingfestivalen starts in Aurdal (February 20 – 24).
- 28 – The By:Larm Festival started in Oslo (February 28 – March 2).

=== March ===
- 6 – The Borealis Festival starts in Bergen (March 6 – 10).
- 17 – The 62nd Narvik Winter Festival starts in Narvik (March 17 – 26).

=== April ===
- 12 – The 46th Vossajazz starts in Vossevangen (April 12 – 14).
- 18 – The Inferno Metal Festival starts in Oslo (April 18–21).
- 24 – The Nidaros Bluesfestival starts in Trondheim (April 24 – 28).

=== May ===
- 3 – The Balejazz starts in Balestrand (May 3 – 5).
- 6 – The 30th MaiJazz starts in Stavanger, Norway (May 6 – 12).
- 8 – The 15th AnJazz, the Hamar Jazz Festival starts at Hamar, Norway (May 8 – 12).
- 22 – The Festspillene i Bergen starts in Bergen (May 22 – June 5).
- 24 – The 47th Nattjazz starts in Bergen (May 24 – June 1).

=== June ===
- 1 – The National Music Day is arranged in Oslo.
- 5 – The Hardanger Musikkfest starts in Hardanger (June 5 – 10).
- 12 – The Bergenfest starts in Bergen (June 12 – 15).
- 13 – The Norwegian Wood music festival starts in Oslo (June 13 – 15).
- 14 – The Kråkeslottfestivalen starts in Bøvær, Senja (June 14 – 16).
- 25 – The Risør kammermusikkfest starts in Risør (June 25 – 30).
- 25 – The Hove Festival starts in Tromøya (June 28 – 29).

=== July ===
- 3 – The Kongsberg Jazzfestival opens at Kongsberg consert (July 3 – 6).
- 4 – The 23rd Skånevik Bluesfestival starts in Skånevik, Norway (July 4 – 6).
- 11 – The 18th Stavernfestivalen starts in Stavern (August 11 – 13).
- 15 – The Moldejazz starts in Molde (August 15 – 20).
- 18 – The Bukta Tromsø Open Air Festival starts in Tromsø (August 18 – 20).
- 24 – The 24th Canal Street Festival starts in Arendal (July 24 – 27).

=== August ===
- 1 – The 32nd Notodden Blues Festival started in Notodden (August 1 – 4).
- 6 – The 20th Øyafestivalen starts in Oslo, Norway (August 6 – 10).
- 8 – The 33rd Sildajazz starts in Haugesund (August 8 – 9).
- 11 – The 34th Oslo Jazzfestival starts in Oslo, Norway (August 11 – 17).

=== September ===
- 5 – The 14th Punktfestivalen opens in Kristiansand (September 5–7).

=== October ===
- 17 – The 37th DølaJazz starts in Lillehammer (October 17 – 20).

== Albums released ==
=== February ===
Day	Album	Artist	Label	Notes	Ref.
2	And Then Comes The Nigh	Mats Eilertsen, Harmen Fraanje, Thomas Strønen	ECM		
8	Dualistic	Dualistic (Bernt Moen, Fredrik Sahlander, Tobias Solbakk)	Losen		
8	Tana	Sverre Gjørvad	Losen		
8	Æ	Anton Eger	Edition	Produced by Petter Eldh and Anton Eger, Executive producer Dave Stapleton	
22	Quilter	Thomas T Dahl	Losen	Produced by Thomas T Dahl	

=== March ===
Day	Album	Artist	Label	Notes	Ref.
1	Sucker Punch	Sigrid	Island Records	Produced by Martin Sjølie	
8	Voyage	Daniel Herskedal	Edition	Produced by Daniel Herskedal, Executive producer Dave Stapleton	
22	Sounds Of 3 Edition 2	Per Mathisen feat. Ulf Wakenius and Gary Husband	Losen		

=== May ===
Day	Album	Artist	Label	Notes	Ref.
24	Northbound	Eivind Austad Trio	Losen		

== See also ==
- 2019 in Norway
- Music of Norway
- Norway in the Eurovision Song Contest 2019
- Spellemannprisen
- Buddyprisen
- Nordlysprisen
- Edvard Grieg Memorial Award
- Thorgeir Stubø Memorial Award
- Rolf Gammleng Memorial Award
- Radka Toneff Memorial Award
