= 2016 in Nordic music =

The following is a list of notable events and releases that happened in Nordic music in 2016.

== Events ==
=== January ===
- 8 – The first recording is released of Danish composer Hans Abrahamsen's Grawemeyer award-winning work, let me tell you.
- 15 – Icelandic broadcaster RÚV reveals the songs competing to be Iceland's entry in the Eurovision Song Contest 2016 during the Rás 2 radio programmes Virkir morgnar and Poppland. Five of the competitors enter English versions of their songs.
- 21 – The 2016 Ice Music Festival opens in Geilo, Norway (January 21–24).
- 25 – The draw to determine which country will participate in which semi-final of the Eurovision Song Contest 2016 takes place in Stockholm City Hall. Sweden is pre-allocated to vote and perform in the first semi-final for scheduling reasons.
- 27
  - The Léonie Sonning Music Foundation announces Leonidas Kavakos as the recipient of the Léonie Sonning Music Prize 2017.
  - The 2016 Bodø Jazz Open opens in Bodø, Norway (January 27–30).
- 29
  - The Ernst von Siemens Music Foundation announces Per Nørgård as the recipient of the 2016 Ernst von Siemens Music Prize.
  - The 2016 Nordlysfestivalen opens in Tromsø, Norway (January 29 – February 7).

=== February ===
- 6
  - Opening of the 56th Melodifestivalen in Sweden.
  - The first of the Uuden Musiikin Kilpailu 2016 Semi-finals takes place in Finland.
- 7
  - The annual Oslo Operaball takes place in Oslo, Norway.
  - Knut Kristiansen and Bergen Big Band hold a release concert for the album Kuria Suite at Verftet in Bergen, Norway.
- 10 – The Ojai Music Festival announces the appointment of Esa-Pekka Salonen as its music director for the 2018 season.
- 13 – The Dansk Melodi Grand Prix Final takes place at the Forum Horsens in Horsens, Denmark. Lighthouse X are selected to represent Denmark at the Eurovision Song Contest 2016.
- 15 – It is announced that Swedish jazz saxophonist and composer Jonas Kullhammar is the recipient of the 2016 Gullinpriset (awarded in memory of the saxophonist Lars Gullin (1928–1976)).
- 16 – Andreas Loven holds a release concert for the album District Six (Losen Records) at Victoria – National Jazz Scene in Oslo.
- 20 – At Söngvakeppnin 2016 in Reykjavík's Laugardalshöll, Greta Salóme is selected to represent Iceland at the Eurovision Song Contest, with the song "Hear Them Calling".
- 26 – A remix of Zara Larsson's hit single "Lush Life", featuring Tinie Tempah, is released, and soon becomes a top 10 hit internationally.
- 27 – The Uuden Musiikin Kilpailu 2016 Final takes place in Finland.

=== March ===
- 2 – By:Larm 2016 starts in Oslo (March 2–5).
- 3
  - Frode Alnæs holds a release concert for the album Kanestrøm (Øra Fonogram) at Victoria – National Jazz Scene in Oslo.
  - The Oslo International Church Music Festival 2016 starts in Oslo (March 3–13).
- 12 – The final of Sweden's Melodifestivalen takes place.
- 17 – Norwegian musician John Martin is convicted of the murder of his wife Natalia Strelchenko, a Russian-born concert pianist, and is sentenced to life in prison.
- 18 – The Vossajazz event opens in Voss, Norway (March 18–20).
- 23 – Inferno Metal Festival 2016 starts in Oslo (March 23–26).

=== April ===
- 1 – In the final of season 9 of Denmark's X Factor, the sister duo Embrace emerge winners, obtaining 60% of the public vote.
- 22 – The final of season 5 of The Voice of Finland is won by Suvi Åkerman, mentored by Tarja Turunen.
- 23 – The Gamlestaden Jazzfestival opens in Gothenburg, Sweden (April 23 – April 30).

=== May ===
- 14 – The final of the Eurovision Song Contest 2016 takes place at the Ericsson Globe in Stockholm. Sweden, the only Scandinavian country to reach the final, finishes in 9th place. Finland, Iceland, Denmark and Norway are all eliminated in the semi-finals.
- 25 – Festspillene i Bergen 2015 starts (May 25 – June 8).
- 26 – Nattjazz starts in Bergen (May 26 – June 4).

=== June ===
- 15 – Bergenfest 2016 with headliner Sigur Rós (June 15 – 18).
- 25 – The 2016 Roskilde Festival opens with a performance by the Syrian National Orchestra for Arabic Music and Damon Albarn (June 25 – July 2).
- 30 – Bråvalla Festival opens near Norrköping, Sweden.

=== July ===
- 3 – The Copenhagen Jazz Festival 2016 opens (July 3–12).
- 6 – The 17th Folk music festival of Siglufjordur opens in Siglufjordur, Iceland (July 6 – 10).
- 14 – G! Festival opens in Göta, with a line-up including Songhoy Blues, Lucy Rose, Federspiel and the Hot 8 Brass Band.
- 18 – Moldejazz 2016 starts with Ola Kvernberg as artist in residence (August 18 – 23).
- date unknown – Magnus Söderman (guitars) and Lawrence Dinamarca (drums) join Nightrage.

=== August ===
- 14 – Oslo Jazzfestival 2016 opens with a concert by the Jan Garbarek Group, featuring Trilok Gurtu (August 14 – 20).

=== September ===
- 4 – The 11th Punktfestivalen opens in Kristiansand, Norway (September 4–6).

=== October ===
- 7 – The 33rd Stockholm Jazz Festival opens in Stockholm, Sweden (October 7–16).
- 13 – The 33rd DølaJazz opens in Lillehammer, Norway (October 13–16).

=== November ===
- 1 – Hans Abrahamsen wins the Nordic Council Music Prize for his work Let Me Tell You.
- 3 – Tampere Jazz Happening opens in Tampere, Finland (November 3–6).
- 6 – The Kongsberg Jazzfestival 2016 opens with Pat Metheny concert (August 6 – 9).

=== December ===
- 6 – Danish band Lukas Graham are nominated for three Grammy Awards, including Record of the Year and Song of the Year for their single "7 Years".

== Albums released ==
=== January ===
- 8 – Anders Hillborg – Sirens, Cold Heat;, Beast Sampler
- 22 – Abbath's debut album Abbath
- 29
  - What Was Said by Tord Gustavsen and his trio, featuring drummer Jarle Vespestad and German-Afghan vocalist Simin Tander (ECM Records
  - Momento by pianist Ayumi Tanaka Trio (AMP) including with Christian Meaas Svendsen (bass) and Per Oddvar Johansen (drums).
  - Ghostlights by Finnish music project Avantasia
  - High Noon by Finnish guitarist Kalle Kalima (ACT Music).
  - Some Other Time – A Tribute To Leonard Bernstein by Nils Landgren (ACT Music).

=== February ===
- 1 – Songbook by Lars Danielsson (ACT Music).
- 3 – Kanestrøm by Norwegian guitarist Frode Alnæs (Øra Fonogram).
- 9 – The Colorist & Emiliana Torrini by The Colorist & Emiliana Torrini
- 11 – 2016: District Six by the pianist Andreas Loven (Losen Records)
- 12 – Olavi by Olavi Uusivirta
- 14 – Story Of I by Myrna (Tomtom & Braza).
- 17 – Picture You by The Amazing, including guitarist Reine Fiske (Partisan Records).
- 19 – Grasque by Choir of Young Believers
- 26 – We Survive by Medina

=== March ===
- 3 – Kanestrøm by Norwegian guitarist Frode Alnæs (Øra Fonogram).
- 6 – Trees Of Light by Anders Jormin / Lena Willemark / Karin Nakagawa (ECM Records).
- 11 – Culturen by Skadedyr (Hubro Records).
- 18 – Reckless Twin by Mads Langer
- 25 – Let’s Dance by Per Oddvar Johansen (Edition Records).
- 26 – We Survive by Medina

=== April ===
- 8 – Arktis by Ihsahn (Candlelight Records)
- 15 – Closer by Christopher (EMI)
- 22 – Jag sjunger ljuset by Eva Dahlgren

=== May ===
- 20 – Då som nu för alltid by Kent (RCA Records)

=== June ===
- 1 – World On Fire by Yngwie Malmsteen
- 3
  - The Brightest Void by Tarja Turunen
  - Good Karma by Roxette
  - Seal the Deal & Let's Boogie by Volbeat
- 10 – Wolf Valley by | Eyolf Dale
- 28 – Now Is The Time by Spirit In The Dark (Audun Erlien, Anders Engen, David Wallumrød)

=== July ===
- 9 – Sounds Of 3 by Per Mathisen Trio (including Frode Alnæs and Gergő Borlai)
- 15 – Vulnicura Live by Björk
- 29 – Rubicon by Mats Eilertsen

=== August ===
- 5 – Apokaluptein by Live Maria Roggen
- 19
  - Femte by Isglem
  - Norwegian Caravan by Come Shine – Kringkastingsorkesteret
- 26
  - Air by Frode Haltli with the Trondheim Soloists and Arditti Quartet
  - Rumi Songs by Trygve Seim
  - Snowmelt by Marius Neset
  - Du Gamla Du Fria by Håkan Hellström
  - The Map of Your Life by Simon Lynge

=== September ===
- 2
  - Buoyancy by Nils Petter Molvær
  - Bushman's Fire by Bushman's Revenge
  - Jazz, Fritt Etter Hukommelsen by Bushman's Revenge
  - Salmeklang by Gjermund Larsen Trio
- 9
  - Atmosphères by Tigran Hamasyan, Arve Henriksen, Eivind Aarset, and Jan Bang
  - Changing Tides by Lukas Zabulionis
  - Grand White Silk by Torun Eriksen
  - Joni Was Right I & II by Marit Larsen
- 16
  - Dödliga Klassiker by Bob Hund (Woah Dad!).
  - Orphée by Jóhann Jóhannsson
  - Sunrain by Haakon Graf Trio, including Erik Smith and Per Mathisen
- 23
- 30
  - Blood Bitch by Jenny Hval
  - It’s Another Wor d by Sigrun Tara Øverland
  - Somewhere In Between by Bugge Wesseltoft

=== October ===
- 7
  - Gode Liv by Stein Torleif Bjella
  - Kurzsam and Fulger by Christian Wallumrød Ensemble
- 14 – Rainbow Session by Harald Lassen
- 21
  - Citizen of Glass by Agnes Obel
  - Her Bor by Frida Ånnevik
  - Pyhät Tekstit by Vesa-Matti Loiri
- 28
  - Homeward Bound by Sabina Ddumba (Warner Music Sweden).
  - Drömmen om julen by Carola Häggkvist
  - Lady Wood by Tove Lo (Island Records)
- 31 – No Right No Left by Andreas Wildhagen

=== November ===
- 4 – Atoma by Dark Tranquillity
- 11
  - December Songs by Olga Konkova and Jens Thoresen
  - StaiStua by Ulvo / Hole / Haltli
  - The Mechanical Fair by Ola Kvernberg
  - The Sleeping Gods/Thorn by Enslaved
- 12 – Stories by Jan Gunnar Hoff
- 14 – Portrait With Hidden Face by Bjørn Kruse
- 17 – My Head Is Listening by Motif
- 19 – 3 Pianos by Tanaka/Lindvall/Wallumrød
- 25
  - Fantômas by Amiina
  - Häxan by Dungen (Mexican Summer).
  - Vannmann86 by Hjerteslag

=== December ===
- 2 – Puzzler by Hilma Nikolaisen
- 11 – Minnismerki by Bubbi Morthens and Dimma
- 16
  - Dråber af Tid by Helene Blum
  - Into the Night World by Machinae Supremacy
  - New York City Magic by Per Mathisen, Utsi Zimring, and David Kikoski

=== date unknown ===
- Efter Regnet by Freddie Wadling
- Mitt hjärta klappar för dig by Benny Anderssons orkester
- Timo sjunger Ted by Timo Räisänen
- Ventre by In Slaughter Natives

== New classical works ==
- Hans Abrahamsen – Left, alone for piano left hand and orchestra
- Olli Kortekangas – Migrations
- Christian Lindberg
  - Robot Gardens
  - Liverpool Lullabies
- Magnus Lindberg – Two Episodes
- Kaija Saariaho – Sense
- Rolf Wallin – Swans Kissing (string quartet)

== Eurovision Song Contest ==
- Denmark in the Eurovision Song Contest 2016
- Finland in the Eurovision Song Contest 2016
- Iceland in the Eurovision Song Contest 2016
- Norway in the Eurovision Song Contest 2016
- Sweden in the Eurovision Song Contest 2016

== Deaths ==
- 17 January – Carina Jaarnek, Swedish singer and Dansband artist, 53 (cerebral haemorrhage)
- 18 January – Else Marie Pade, Danish composer, 91
- 25 January – Leif Solberg, Norwegian composer and organist, 101
- 4 February – Ulf Söderblom, Finnish conductor, 85
- 19 February – Harald Devold, Norwegian jazz musician, 51 (cancer)
- 20 February
  - Ole Erling, Danish musician, 77
  - Ove Verner Hansen, Danish actor and opera singer, 85
- 29 February – Josefin Nilsson, Swedish singer, 46
- 24 April – Jan Henrik Kayser, Norwegian pianist, 81
- 1 May – Sydney Onayemi, Nigerian-born Swedish DJ, 78
- 4 May – Olle Ljungström, Swedish singer and guitarist, 54
- 9 May – Riki Sorsa, Finnish singer ("Reggae OK"), 63 (cancer)
- 14 May – Lasse Mårtenson, Finnish singer ("Laiskotellen"), 81
- 16 May – Fredrik Norén, Swedish jazz drummer, 75 (death announced on this date)
- 2 June – Freddie Wadling, Swedish singer and songwriter, 64
- 8 June – Terje Fjærn, 73, Norwegian orchestra conductor ("La det swinge").
- 18 June – Sverre Kjelsberg, 69, Norwegian singer, guitarist, bassist, composer, and lyricist
- 27 June – Pelle Gudmundsen-Holmgreen, Danish composer, 83
- 18 July – Karina Jensen, Danish singer (Cartoons), cancer. (death announced on this date)
- 27 July – Einojuhani Rautavaara, Finnish composer, 87
- 27 September – Märta Schéle, Swedish singer, 80
- 30 September – Lilleba Lund Kvandal, Norwegian opera singer, 76
- 12 November – Jacques Werup, Swedish musician and writer, 71
- 14 December
  - Arnie Norse, Norwegian singer and entertainer, 91
  - Päivi Paunu, Finnish singer, 70 (cancer)
