= 2004 in Norwegian music =

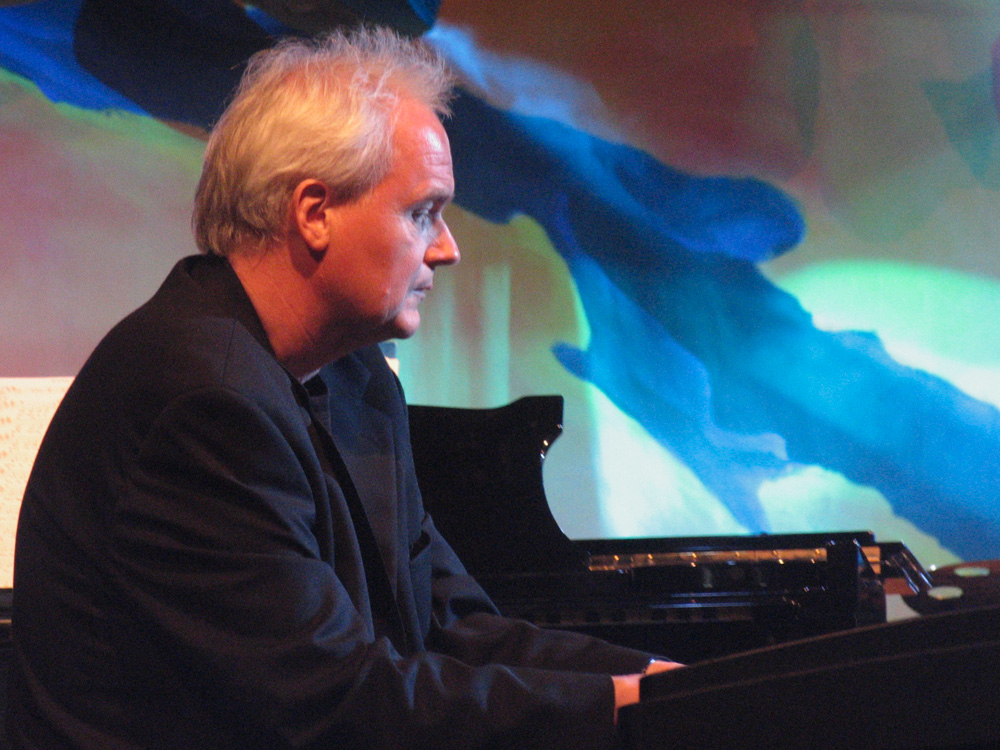
Ketil Bjornstad at the Moers Festival.

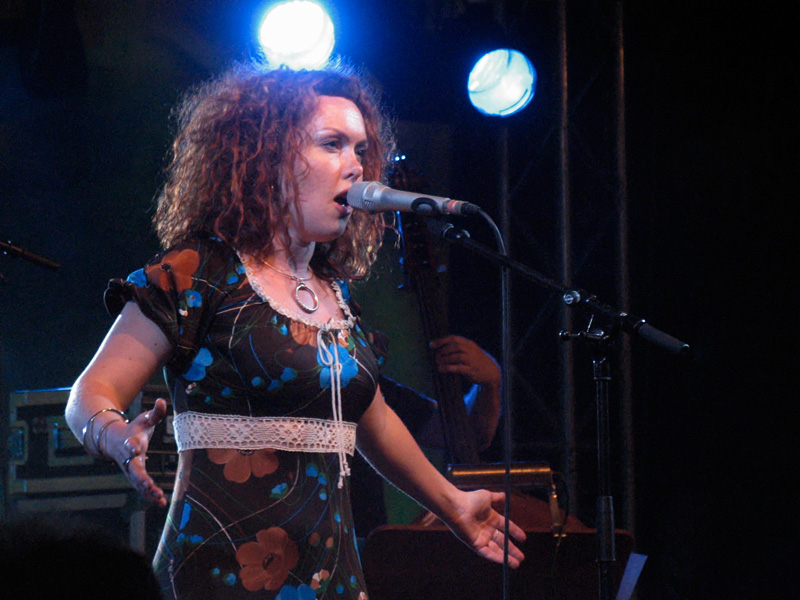
Kristin Asbjørnsen at the Moers Festival.

The following is a list of notable events and releases of the year 2004 in Norwegian music.

== Events ==
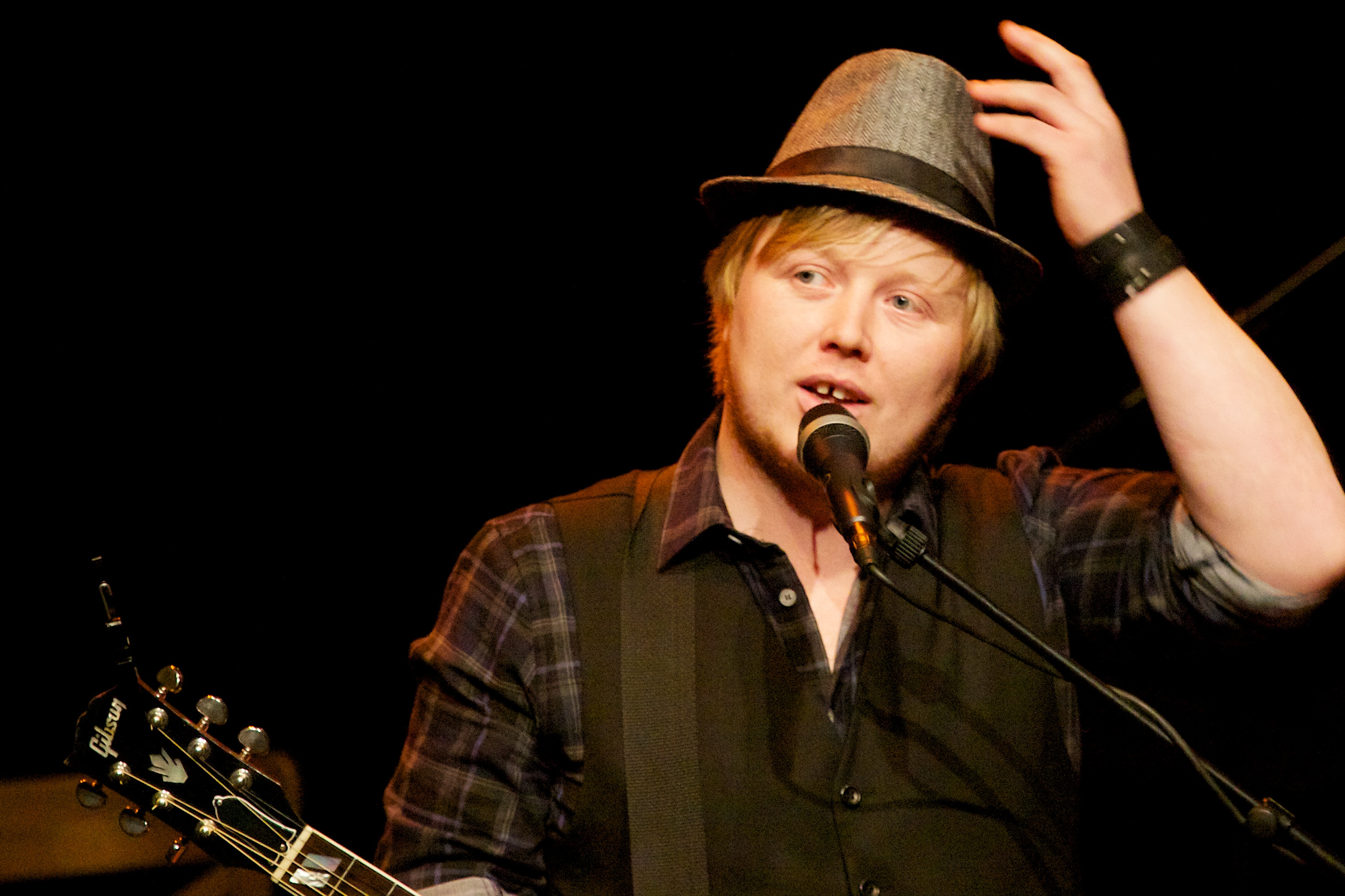
Kurt Nilsen wins the World Idol competition on 1 January.

=== January ===
- 1 – The pop/country singer Kurt Nilsen, whom won the first season of the Norwegian version of the reality television show Pop Idol in May 2003, wins the World Idol competition which was a one-off international version of Pop Idol featuring winners of the various national Idol shows.
- 22 – The 7th Polarjazz started in Longyearbyen, Svalbard (January 22 – 25).
- 30 – The 23rd annual Djangofestival started on Cosmopolite in Oslo (January 30 – 31).

=== February ===
- 5 – Kristiansund Opera Festival opened (February 5 – 21).

=== March ===
- 6 – The election of the participant for Norway in the Eurovision Song Contest 2004.
- 12 – The annual By:Larm started in Oslo (March 12 – 15).

=== April ===
- 2
  - The 31st Vossajazz started at Vossavangen (April 2 – 4).
  - Magne Thormodsæter was awarded Vossajazzprisen 2004.
- 3 – Svein Folkvord performs the commissioned work Across for Vossajazz 2004.
- 23 – Ole Blues started in Bergen (April 23 – May 1).

=== May ===
- 11 – The 15th MaiJazz started in Stavanger (May 11 – 15).
- 19
  - The start of Bergen International Music Festival Festspillene i Bergen (May 19 – 30).
  - The 32nd Nattjazz started in Bergen (May 19 – 29).

=== June ===
- 16 – The Norwegian Wood started in Oslo (June 16 – 19).
- 30 – The 40th Kongsberg Jazzfestival started in Kongsberg (June 30 – July 3).

=== July ===
- 12 – The 44th Moldejazz started in Molde (July 12 – 17).
- 20 – Maria Mena performs "You're the Only One" on Late Show with David Letterman.

=== August ===
- 5 – The 17th Notodden Blues Festival started in Notodden (August 5 – 8).
- 9 – The 19th Oslo Jazzfestival started in Oslo (August 9 – 15).
- 11 – The 18th Sildajazz started in Haugesund (August 11 – 15).

=== September ===
- 1 – The Trondheim Jazz Festival started in Trondheim (September 1 – 5).
- 14 – The DølaJazz started in Lillehammer (September 14 – 17).
- 30 – The 2nd Ekkofestival started in Bergen (September 30 – Oktober 3.

=== Oktober ===
- 3 – The Ultima Oslo Contemporary Music Festival started in Oslo (Oktober 3 – 17).
- 26 – The 3rd Insomnia Festival started in Tromsø (October 26 – 28).

=== November ===
- 2 – The Oslo World Music Festival started in Oslo (November 2 – 7).

=== December ===
- 11– The Nobel Peace Prize Concert was held in Oslo Spektrum.

== Albums released ==
=== August ===
Day	Album	Artist	Label	Notes	Ref.
30	Diverted Travels	Jon Balke & Magnetic North Orchestra	ECM Records	Produced by Jon Balke, Manfred Eicher	

=== September ===
Day	Album	Artist	Label	Notes	Ref.
27	In Praise of Dreams	Jan Garbarek	ECM Records	Produced by Jan Garbarek, Manfred Eicher	

=== Unknown date ===
A

Eivind Aarset

- Connected (Jazzland Recordings)

S

Karl Seglem

- New North (NorCD)

== Deaths ==
January

- 14 – Terje Bakken, rock singer known as "Valfar", Windir (born 1978).

February

- 20 – Ørnulf Gulbransen, classical flautist (born 1916).

May

- 13 – Kjell Bækkelund, classical pianist (born 1930).

July

- 2 – Carsten Klouman, jazz pianist and band leader (born 1923).

October

- 2 – Bjørnar Andresen, jazz bassist (born 1945).
- 13 – Erik Bye, journalist, artist, author, film actor, folk singer and radio and television personality (born 1926).
- 16 – Jon Bratt Otnes, opera singer and diplomat (born 1919).

December

- 21 – Arild Nyquist, singer, author, and visual artist (born 1937).
- 26 – Sigurd Køhn, jazz saxophonist, tsunami (born 1959).

== See also ==
- 2004 in Norway
- Music of Norway
- Norway in the Eurovision Song Contest 2004
