= 1919 in Norwegian music =

The following is a list of notable events and releases of the year 1919 in Norwegian music.

== Births ==
February

- 15 – Stephan Henrik Barratt-Due, violinist and music teacher (died 1985).

March

- 2 – Bjørn Fongaard, composer, guitarist, and teacher (died 1980).

July

- 12 – Jon Bratt Otnes, opera singer and diplomat (died 2004).
- 27 – Per Hjort Albertsen, composer (died 2015).

September

- 8 – Johan Kvandal, composer and music critic (died 1999).
- 28 – Fred Lange-Nielsen, jazz bassist and vocalist (died 1989).

November

- 25 – Øistein Sommerfeldt, composer (died 1994).

== See also ==
- 1919 in Norway
- Music of Norway
