= Otnes (surname) =

Otnes is a surname. Notable people with the surname include:

- Fred Otnes, American illustrator
- Jon Bratt Otnes
- Ola Otnes, Norwegian actor
