= 1937 in Norwegian music =

The following is a list of notable events and releases of the year 1937 in Norwegian music.

== Deaths ==
May

- 9 – Fridthjov Anderssen, composer (born 1876).

== Births ==
February

- 1 – Erik Amundsen, jazz bassist (died 2015).

March

- 6 – Arild Nyquist, novelist, poet, writer of children's books, and musician (died 2004).
- 10 – Alfred Janson, pianist and composer (died 2019).
- 26 – Bjørn Lie-Hansen, opera singer (died 2018).

May

- 11 – Eyvind Solås, pianist, composer, actor and program host at NRK (died 2011).
- 15 – Karin Krog, jazz singer and composer.

October

- 31 – Per Øien, classical flutist (died 2016).

== See also ==
- 1937 in Norway
- Music of Norway
