= Tønes =

Norwegian singer

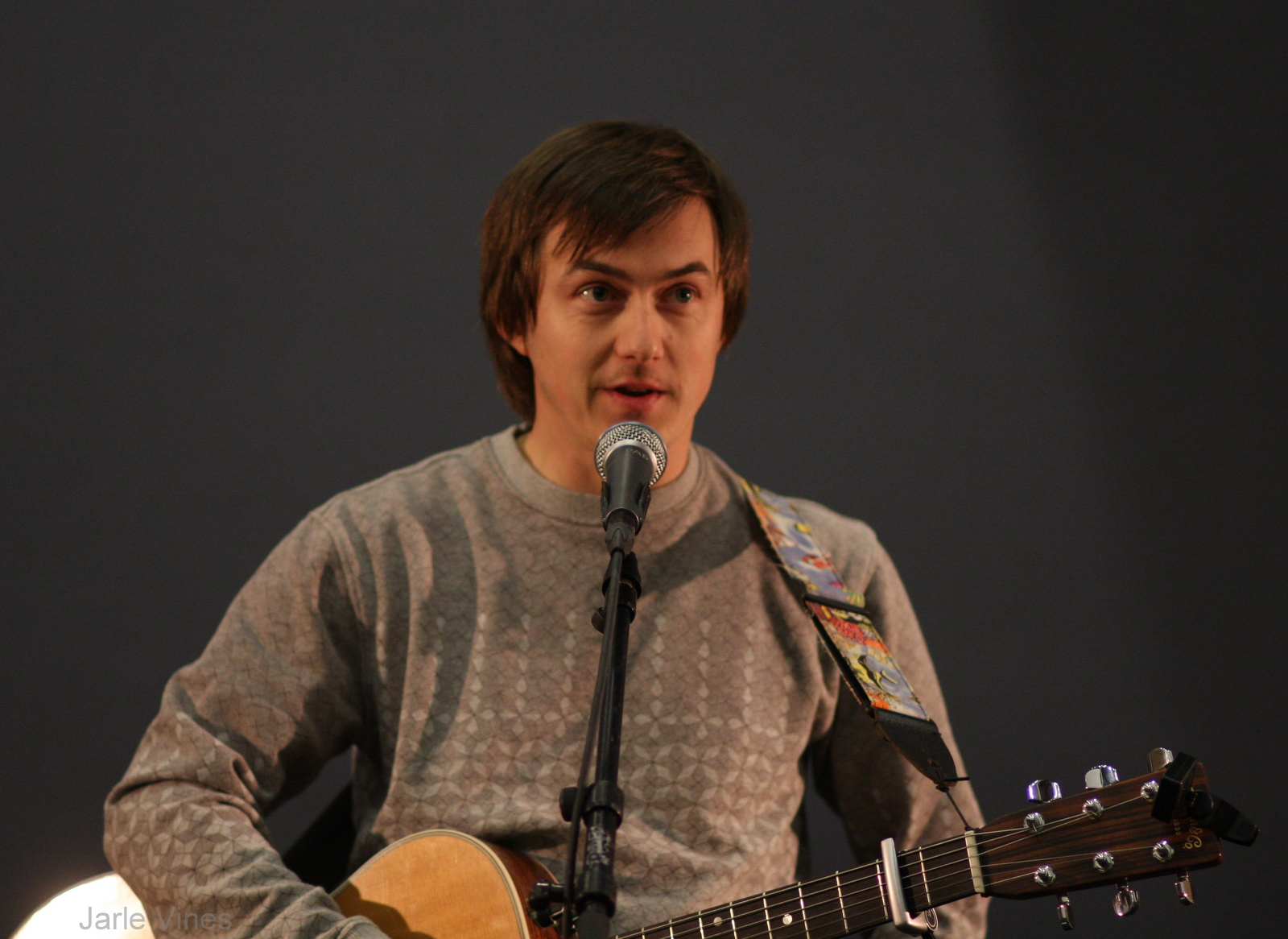
- Tønes performing at the inauguration of Time library (Photo: Jarle Vines)

Background information
- Born: Frank Tønnesen; 28 April 1972 (age 54); Sokndal Municipality, Norway
- Occupations: Singer, songwriter, musician
- Instruments: Vocals, guitar
- Years active: 1996–present
- Labels: LW Records; LW Entertainment; EMI (2001–10); Universal Republic (2010); Universal Music Canada (2011–present)
- Website: toenes.com

Frank Tønnesen (born 28 April 1972), better known by his stage name Tønes, is a Norwegian singer-songwriter and guitarist from Sokndal Municipality, Norway. He released his debut album, Rett te håves, in 1996 and has since released a number of albums and EPs. He uses the Sokndal dialect in many of his songs and tells intriguing stories. In 2018 he released his first novel under the name Vi kan ikke ta med oss alt dette hjem.

Tønes performs both solo and with a backing band that differs in configuration, sometimes consisting of just a bass and/or accordion. Among his bandmates are Gaute Tengesdal (bass and backing vocals), Erlend Aasland (guitar, steel guitar, banjo, mandolin, piano, auto harp and backing vocals), Kjell Gudmestad (steel-guitar and electric guitar), and Øystein Holmen (keyboards, backing vocals). Arne Andersen joined, playing percussion in 2012, and later Anne Lise Frøkedal also joined playing electric guitar and keyboards and also contributing with backing vocals. In the early years Johan Egdetveit (accordion) performed in some shows.

== Discography ==
=== Albums ===
- 1996: Rett te håves [Kinkverk]
- 1998: Gobai [Kinkverk]
- 2000: Det så e inne i krabben [Broiler Farm]
- 2004: Grønnare gras [Broiler Farm]
- 2008: Tork av deg fliret [Hype City/VME]
- 2009: Sobihob [Hype City]
- 2012: Sån av Salve [Hype City] (reached No. 7 in VG-lista)
- 2015: Vindbrest / Playground / Cosmos Music Group (reached No. 2 in VG-lista)
- 2017: Sesong Fire[Kinkverk]
- 2021: Thilda Bøes Legat[Kinkverk]

=== EPs ===
- 1998: Maleri [Kinkverk]
- 1999: Bonde [Kinkverk]
- 2000: Sko ikke sagt någe hvis det va drid [Broiler Farm]
- 2003: Sju [Broiler Farm]
- 2017: Ikkje mogna [Kinkverk / Border Music]

Awards
Preceded by Lars Vaular	Recipient of the lyricist Spellemannprisen; 2012	Succeeded by Frida Ånnevik
Preceded by Ellen Sofie Hovland	Recipient of the folk Spellemannprisen; 2015	Succeeded by Frida Ånnevik
