= Førde International Folk Music Festival =

Norwegian music festival

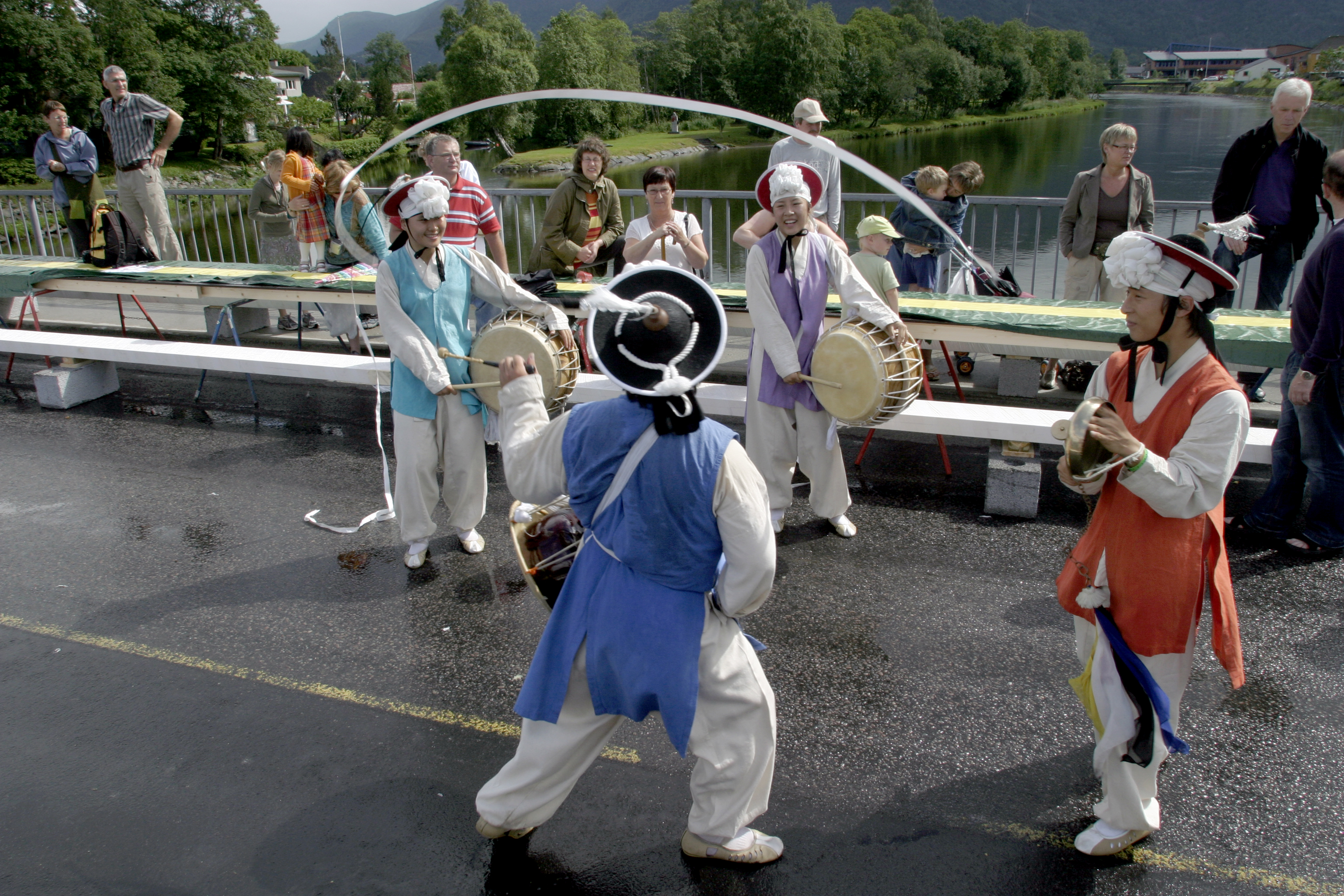
Musicians at the Førde Festival

The Førde International Folk Music Festival is an annual event held in Sunnfjord Municipality in the Norwegian county of Vestland. Under the patronage of Crown Princess Mette-Marit, it covers traditional folk and world music.

== Background ==
Established in 1990, Scandinavia's largest traditional music festival is held in Førde in the first half of July each year, presenting musicians and dancers from around the world. A wide variety of artists from some 120 countries have participated over the past 25 years. Fordehuset, the central venue, offers four concert halls, the largest accommodating an audience of up to 2,500. Smaller events take place around the town in hotels and cultural institutions. In addition to its concerts, the event includes workshop, exhibitions and dancing.

The festival has been held under royal patronage since 2006, first under Queen Sonja and from 2011 under Crown Princess Mette-Marit. In January 2016, the princess confirmed she would continue to act as the event's patron from 2016 to 2020.

In 2016, the festival will be held from 6 to 10 July.
