= Myrna Braza =

- Born: 3 November 1983 (age 42); Bergen, Norway
- Origin: Norwegian
- Occupations: Singer, composer
- Instruments: Vocals
- Labels: Tomtom&Braza
- Website: www.myrnabraza.no

Myrna Braza (born 3 November 1983, Bergen, Norway) is a Norwegian-Filipino singer, songwriter and vocal coach/producer.

== Career ==
Braza is a graduate at Bergen Katedralskole, where she got her Examen artium in 2002. Known for her distinctive, soulful voice and charisma on stage, her music has been described as combining soul and pop. She released her debut solo album Free As a Bird in 2009, and has since released four total albums, along with numerous singles and music videos. She is particularly known for her live shows, having played concerts at venues and festivals in Norway, UK and the Philippines.

Braza has been the opening artist for the world-renowned soul artists Raphael Saadiq and Dwele. She's featured as a singer and songwriter on several Norwegian and International releases and collaborated with many artists throughout the years. Braza has performed at festivals such as Natjazz, Skånevik Bluesfestival, QuartFestivalen, 100 Dagar, Balejazz, and ByLarm. She has also performed on the NRK programme Beat for Beat with Christian Ingebrigtsen and has made other TV appearances, including Lydverket and Korslaget on TV2. In 2022 she reintroduced herself under the new name MYRNA, releasing her first EP with songs in Norwegian before once again returning to English-language music. She is also currently the lead singer in "Oh Snap!," a prominent party band in Bergen.

== Discography ==
=== Solo albums ===
- 2009: Free As a Bird (Frö by Löft)
- 2013: Moments (Frö by Löft), EP
- 2016: Story of I (Frö by Löft)
- 2022: Fakker opp (Frö by Löft)

=== Collaborations ===
With Kahuun – Kai Stoltz

- 2007: Bontelabo (Bagpak Records), feat. Myrna Braza

2022: "Fakker opp (ft. Angelo Reira)"
