= Arcane Station =

- Born: Thomas Pettersen; March 21, 1981 (age 44); Bodø, Norway
- Genres: Electropop; Indie pop
- Years active: 2014–present
- Labels: daWorks Records
- Website: arcanestation.com

Arcane Station (born 21 March 1981) is a Norwegian musician, producer and songwriter.

He released his debut single, Make Me a Bird, in January 2015. The song, featuring singer-songwriter Marianne Hekkilæ on lead vocals, was playlisted by a number of Norwegian radio stations, including NRK P3 and NRK P1. In autumn 2015 the song was officially released in Sweden and Poland.

== Discography ==
Extended plays

- Doin' It My Own Way EP (2015)

Singles

- "Crossing Rivers (Away From You)" (2018)
- "Golden" (2017)
- "1minutecanbepowerful" (2017)
- "Make Me a Bird (Arcane Runway Edition)" (2017)
- "Let Them Fall" feat. Marianne Hekkilæ (2016)
- "Doin' It My Own Way" feat. Lydia Waits (2015)
- "Make Me a Bird" feat. Marianne Hekkilæ (2015)

== Music videos ==
- "Let Them Fall" (2017), directed by Christopher Meyers, a director from USA.
- "Make Me a Bird" (2015), directed by Iwona Bielecka, a director from Warsaw, Poland.
