= Olavsfestdagene =

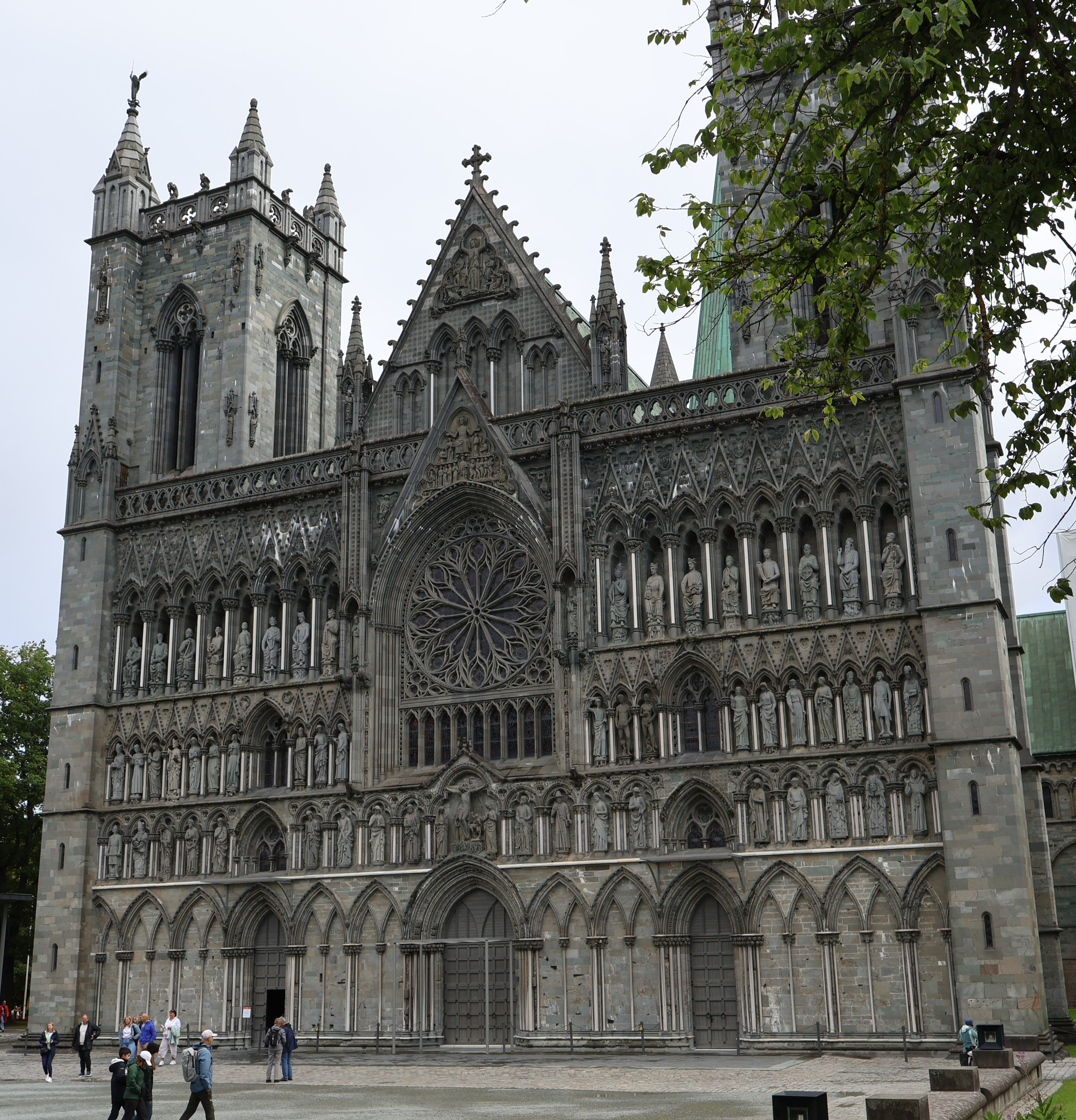
- Olavsvaka (the Olav vigil) is held in Nidaros Cathedral the night of 29 July. It starts with a church service at 23:00. Throughout the night there are prayers every hour, until the morning song at 06:00. There is a special atmosphere in the cathedral that night.
- Status: Active
- Genre: Church Music Festival
- Date: July - August
- Begins: 28 July 2015
- Ends: 2 August 2015
- Frequency: Annually
- Location: Trondheim
- Country: Norway
- Years active: 1962 - present
- Website: www.olavsfestdagene.no

Olavsfestdagene (initiated 1962 under the name Olavsdagene) is a church and cultural festival held in Trondheim around Olsok every year.

== Background ==
During the festival more than 300 events with 800 international and Norwegian artists are presented (2005). The events take place at venues throughout the city, like Nidaros Cathedral, Olavshallen, The Norwegian Freemasonry, Vår Frue kirke, Rica Nidelven Arena and on the outdoor stage in Borggården at Erkebispegården and Torvet (the marked place). Orchestras, bands, soloists, choirs, opera and actors perform for a visitors and residents audience. There are also historical markets with games, jugglers and trade in the courtyard, and a plethora of activities for children and youth, including treasure hunts, music workshop and stone carving. Other events are jousting, exhibitions, church services, courses, lectures and pilgrimage program. Every night during Olavsfestdagene Jazzvaka is also held at the Kjeller’n in Olavskvartalet.

In 2015 the Olavsfestdagene takes place in the period July 28 - August 2, and are visited by the international artist Sting.

== History ==
Olavsfestdagenes is historically anchored in the veneration of Olaf II of Norway. Today's festival is a continuation of the tradition of Olavsdagene, which started in 1962. Pilgrims from many countries choose to visit Nidaros Cathedral during the festival. Olavsfestdagene is one out of four junction festivals (knutepunktfestivaler) with national status in Norway, and has the task of ensuring the church fete celebration in Nidaros Cathedral and the worship of Olav.

Randi Wenche Haugen was festival director from August 11, 2008 to August 31, 2013. Petter Myhr, former director at the popular music museum Rockheim, replaced her in a fixed term position September 1, 2013.
