= Jon Bratt Otnes =

Norwegian diplomat and opera singer (1919–2004)

Jon Bratt Otnes (né John Jakob Otnes; 12 July 1919, in Oslo – 16 October 2004, in ibidem) was a Norwegian opera singer and subsequently a civil servant in Norway. When retired, Otnes acted as Albania's honorary consul-general in Norway.

Otnes was born into a family of ex-cotters, the lowest class of the farmer estate. In the 1970s and presenting a heavily erroneous ahnentafel, Otnes began to claim publicly that he was the current head of the Medieval noble family of Brat or Bratt and that he thus could have been King of Norway and King of Sweden. This case caused much controversy between the 1970s and 2000. Otnes' patrilineal ancestors may be traced back to 1790, when they were tenant farmers.
