= Per Hjort Albertsen =

Norwegian composer (1919–2015)

- Born: 27 July 1919; Trondheim, Norway
- Died: 12 August 2015 (aged 96)
- Education: Oslo Conservatory of Music
- Occupation: Composer

Per Hjort Albertsen (27 July 1919 – 12 August 2015) was a Norwegian composer.

He was born in Trondheim. He graduated as an architect from the Norwegian Institute of Technology in 1943, and studied the organ at the Oslo Conservatory of Music whence he graduated in 1946. He was the organist at the Church of Our Lady, Trondheim from 1947 to 1968, lecturer at the University of Trondheim from 1968 til 1972 and rector of the Trøndelag Conservatory of Music from 1972 to 1983. He received the King's Medal of Merit in gold.
