= Canal Street (Arendal, Norway) =

Music festival in Arendal, Norway

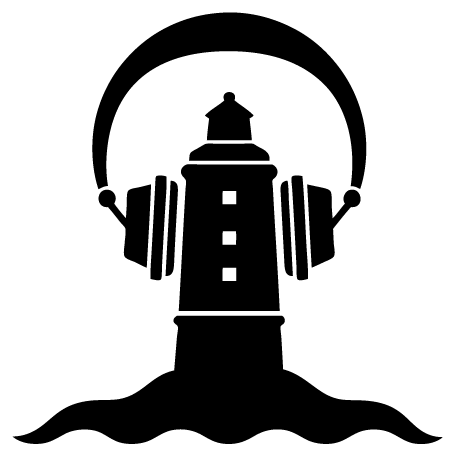
- Genre: All genres
- Locations: Arendal, Aust-Agder, Norway
- Coordinates: 58°28′56″N 08°46′57″E
- Years active: 1996–present
- Founders: Mats Aronsen
- Website: canalstreet.no

Canal Street is an annual music festival in Arendal (Agder, Norway), established in 1996.

The festival is known for its use of unusual venues, such as the Lille Torungen Lighthouse, the city's main cemetery, the island of Merdø, and even the local landfill, Heftingsdalen. This has been described as creating “magical moments in unique places”.

The name derives from Arendal's history as a town of canals, while also referencing the street parades of New Orleans.

== History ==
The festival was first presented in 1996 as Arendal Jazz & Blues Festival, and for many years it was one of the few Norwegian festivals where jazz and blues were the main genres. Over time, jazz has remained a staple of the festival programme, while genres such as rock and pop—and even the occasional opera concert—have also been introduced.

The festival grew from a weekend event in 1996 to a full week in 2006, but has since remained a four-day event. It has an unusual ownership structure, with originally two public – Arendal Municipality and Agder County Municipality – and two private – NOV and Arendals Fossekompani – owners. In 2024, Agder County Municipality transferred its shares to Arendal Municipality, and the festival currently (2025) has three owners.

Besides a full-time festival director and a small number of part-time employees working with marketing and production, the festival relies entirely on volunteers. Each year, around 350 people from the area assist with the stage setup, security, bar service, and various other tasks.

Canal Street was certified as a "green venue" in 2006 as one of the first festivals in Norway. The festival joined the UN's Carbon Neutral Network and supported Earth Hour 2009.

=== Children's programme ===
Starting in 2008, the festival has arranged free daily concerts and activities for children. The program, known as BarneStreet («Children's Street»), aims to present quality music and artists to a young audience.

=== Talent competition ===
The festival arranges a talent competition for youth between the ages of 15 and 25, where the winning band or artist is invited to perform on one of the main stages the following year. The competition, named UnderStreet, is judged by established musicians, and the initiative is supported by the South Norway Jazz Centre.

=== International artists ===
Although taking place in a small town, the festival has presented several international headliners – such as Patti Smith, Bob Geldof, Gary Moore, Lauryn Hill, Lizz Wright, The Waterboys, Esperanza Spalding, Solomon Burke, John Mayall, Angélique Kidjo, Melody Gardot, Al Di Meola, Joss Stone, Yellowjackets, Mike Stern, Suzanne Vega, as well as internationally renowned Norwegian musicians.
