= Natalia Strelchenko =

- Also known as: Natalia Strelle
- Born: Natalia Strelchenko; 23 December 1976; Russian SFSR
- Died: 30 August 2015 (aged 38) Manchester, UK
- Genres: Classical
- Instrument: Piano

Natalia Strelchenko (Russian: Наталья Стрельченко, romanized: Natalya Strelchenko; 23 December 1976 – 30 August 2015), also known as Natalia Strelle, was a Norwegian concert pianist of Russian origin. She died shortly after being found by police officers at her home at Newton Heath in Manchester, UK, on 30 August 2015. A post mortem indicated that she had died of head and neck injuries.

== Biography ==
Strelchenko played her first concert at the age of 12 with the Leningrad Symphony Orchestra. She was educated at the St. Petersburg State Conservatory and the Norwegian Academy of Music (NMH) in Oslo. She worked from 1995 to 2000 as an accompanist and teacher at Saint Petersburg Conservatory. She held a research fellowship at NMH from 2007 to 2010 and was artist in residence at Leeds College of Music in 2008. She was awarded her PhD from NMH for her thesis Stile Brillante. Piano technique in historical perspective in 2011.

Strelchenko was renowned as a concert pianist and her playing was described as virtuosic, having played at prestigious venues such as Wigmore Hall and Carnegie Hall to rave reviews. She was an artistic director of the Menestrelles International Chamber Music Academy as well as assistant Professor in the conservatoire at Belfort in eastern France.

== Death ==
Police and paramedics were called to Strelchenko's home in Culcheth Lane, Newton Heath, Manchester at around 12:45 of 30 August 2015. Despite attempts to revive her she died shortly later in hospital. A post mortem indicated that she had died from head and neck injuries. Her husband and manager, Norwegian double bass player John Martin, was subsequently charged with her murder and the attempted murder of a teenager who could not be named for legal reasons. Martin stood trial in February and March 2016. He was found guilty of Strelchenko's murder and sentenced to life in prison.

== Discography ==
=== CDs ===
- Franz Liszt - 12 Études d'exécution transcendante (2005)
- Agathe Backer-Grøndahl - Complete Piano Music (Volumes 1–5) (2006-2007)
- Thomas Tellefsen - Complete Piano Music (Volumes 1–2) on historical Broadwood from 1843 (2009)
- Friedrich Kuhlau - La Clochette, Selected Sonatinas

=== DVDs ===
- DVD production "History of piano technique" in collaboration with Finchcocks Instrument Museum (2010)
