= Risør kammermusikkfest =

Norwegian chamber music festival

The Risør Chamber Music Festival Risør kammermusikkfest
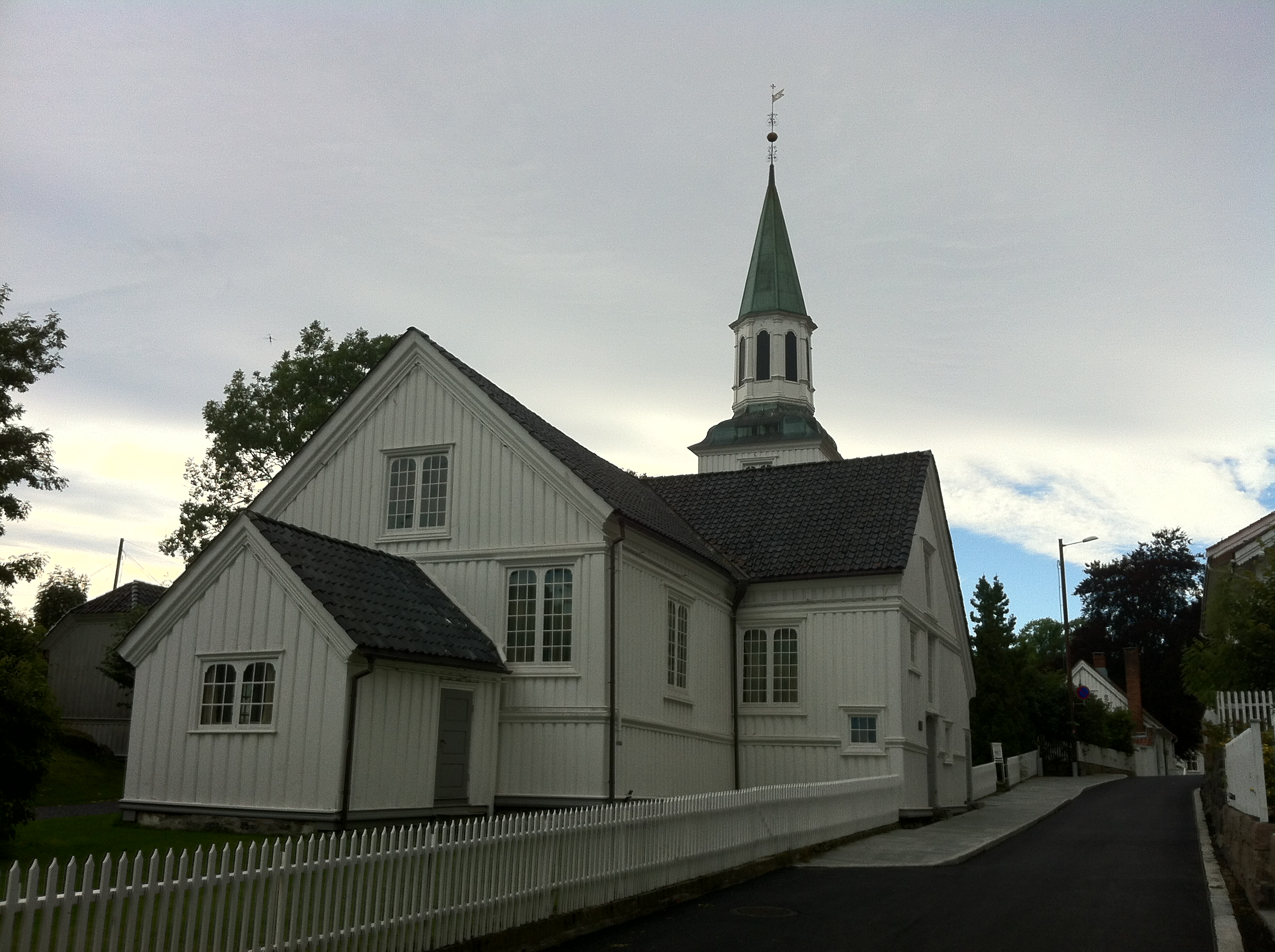
- Status: Active
- Genre: Music Festival
- Date: Late June
- Begins: 25 June 2019
- Ends: 30 June 2019
- Frequency: Annually
- Venue: Risør Church
- Location: Risør
- Country: Norway
- Years active: 1991–present
- Founder: Bernt Lauritz Larsen and Lars Anders Tomter
- Website: www.kammermusikkfest.no

Risør kammermusikkfest or the Risør Chamber Music Festival is an annually occurring festival in Risør, Norway. It was established in 1991 by Bernt Lauritz Larsen from Risør, in collaboration with Lars Anders Tomter. From 1992 Leif Ove Andsnes entered as artistic director with Tomter.

Turid Birkeland, former Norwegian Culture minister, replaced Bernt Lauritz Larsen as festival manager in 2004. After a tour to Brussels, London and New York in 2010, Birkeland and Andsnes resigned, and Henning Kraggerud entered as new artistic director with Tomter. At the same time, the festival entered into a collaboration with the Det Norske Kammerorkester. DNK's director Per Erik Kise Larsen became the festival director, the orchestra became a permanent festival orchestra, and the festival and orchestra received joint administration.

This scheme ended in 2016. Erik Kise Larsen was terminated as festival director, and Henning Kraggerud and Lars Anders Tomter both joined as artistic leaders. Eirik Raude was hired as the new festival manager the same year. The festival was linked up with artistic guest leaders, such as pianist Enrico Pace in 2017 and violinist Christian Tetzlaff in 2018. In 2019, mezzo-soprano Marianne Beate Kielland became the artistic director of the festival.

Risør Church, built in 1647, is still the festival's main venue, but in the concert hall on Hødnebø, on the water's edge overlooking the archipelago, the festival features creative musical collaboration across age and genre.
