= AnJazz =

Jazz festival in Hamar, Norway

AnJazz Hamar Jazzfestival
- Status: Active
- Genre: Jazz Festival
- Date: May
- Begins: 8 May 2019
- Ends: 12 May 2019
- Frequency: Annually
- Location: Hamar
- Country: Norway
- Years active: 2005 - present
- Inaugurated: Founded 2005
- Founder: Anja Katrine Tomter
- Website: anjazz.no

AnJazz or Hamar Jazz Festival is an annual jazz festival occurring at Hamar, Norway.

== History ==
The festival has been arranged since 2005. The Hamar Theater is the festival's secretariat and represents the festival's point of contact and operational unit during the festival. The association has a close collaboration with the initiator Anja Katrine Tomter, who is the festival producer.

== Eksterne lenker ==
- Official website
