= Oslo International Church Music Festival =

Christian music festival in Norway

Coordinates: 59.9094°N 10.7415°E

Oslo International Church Music Festival Oslo Internationale Kirkemusikkfestival
- Status: Active
- Genre: Church music Festival
- Date: Early March
- Begins: 4 March 2016
- Ends: 13 March 2016
- Location: Kongens Gate 4, Oslo, Norway
- Years active: 2000–present
- Founder: Bente Johnsrud
- Patron: Mette-Marit, Crown Princess of Norway
- Website: www.oicmf.no

Oslo International Church Music Festival (Norwegian: Oslo internasjonale Kirkemusikkfestival) is a church music festival held every year in March in Oslo, Norway.

== History ==
The festival, founded in 2000 by artistic and festival director Bente Johnsrud is cured by a non-profit organization of the same name, and staged under the patronage of Mette-Marit, Crown Princess of Norway. Churches such as the Medieval church Gamle Aker are used as Concert halls.
