= Frida Ånnevik =

Norwegian jazz singer (born 1994)

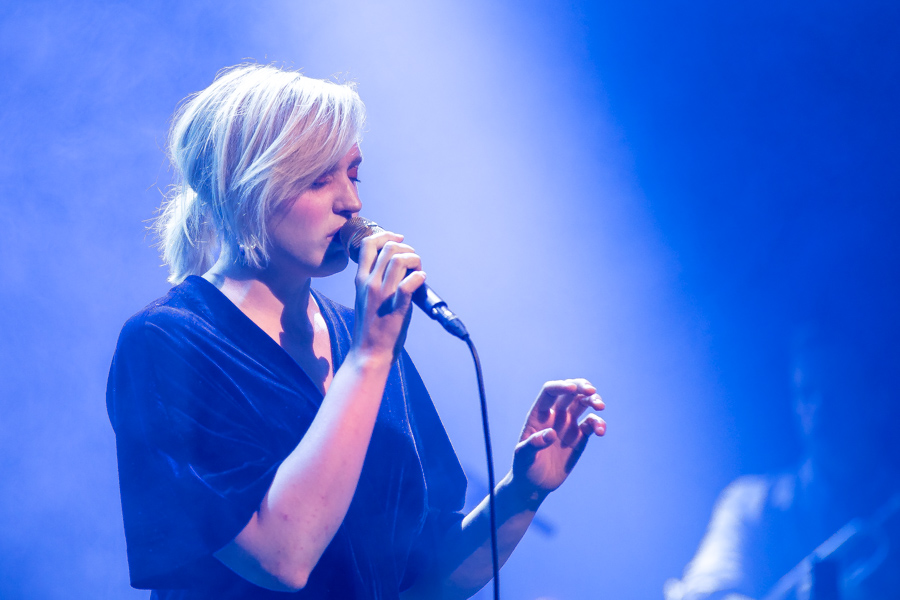
- At Kongsberg Jazzfestival 2019

Background information
- Born: June 18, 1984 (age 42)
- Origin: Hamar, Norway
- Genres: Vocal jazz
- Label: Grappa Music
- Website: fridaannevik.no

Frida Ånnevik (born 18 June 1984 in Hamar, Norway) is a Norwegian jazz singer and the daughter of folk singer Tor Karseth.

== Biography ==
Ånnevik won the Grappa's debutant award in 2009, and released her debut album Synlige Hjerteslag the year after. The album was awarded 10 out of 10 on NRK P1 program Norsk på norsk. She won the Norwegian Lyricist Fund debutant award for 2010, awarded by NOPA. She was also nominated in two categories for the Spellemannprisen 2010, This years newcomer and Folk singer of the year, for this album.

In 2013 she released the album Ville Ord, and was awarded Spellemannprisen 2013 class Lyricist and was also nominated in the class Folk singer. In 2014 she was awarded Neshornet, a cultural prize award by the newspaper Klassekampen, and together with the band In The Country released the album Skogens Sang in 2014. The album was nominated for Spellemannprisen 2014 in the open class.

== Honors ==
- 2008: Telenor talent award, Kristiansand
- 2009: Grappas debutant price
- 2010: The Norwegian Lyricist Fund debutant award, for the album Synlige Hjerteslag
- 2013: Spellemannprisen in the category Lyricist of the year, for the album Ville Ord
- 2014: Neshornet, a cultural prize award by the newspaper Klassekampen
- 2015: Prøysenprisen

== Discography ==
- 2010: Synlige Hjerteslag (Grappa Music)
- 2013: Ville Ord (Grappa Music)
- 2014: Skogens Sang (Grappa Music), with In the Country
- 2016: Her Bor (Grappa Music)
- 2017: Flyge Fra (Grappa Music)

Awards
| Preceded by Frank Tønnesen | Recipient of the lyricist Spellemannprisen; 2013 | Succeeded by Siri Nilsen |
| Preceded by Frank Tønnesen | Recipient of the folk Spellemannprisen; 2016/2017 | Succeeded by - |
