= Oslo Opera Ball =

Music festival in Oslo, Norway

Oslo Opera Ball Oslo Operaball
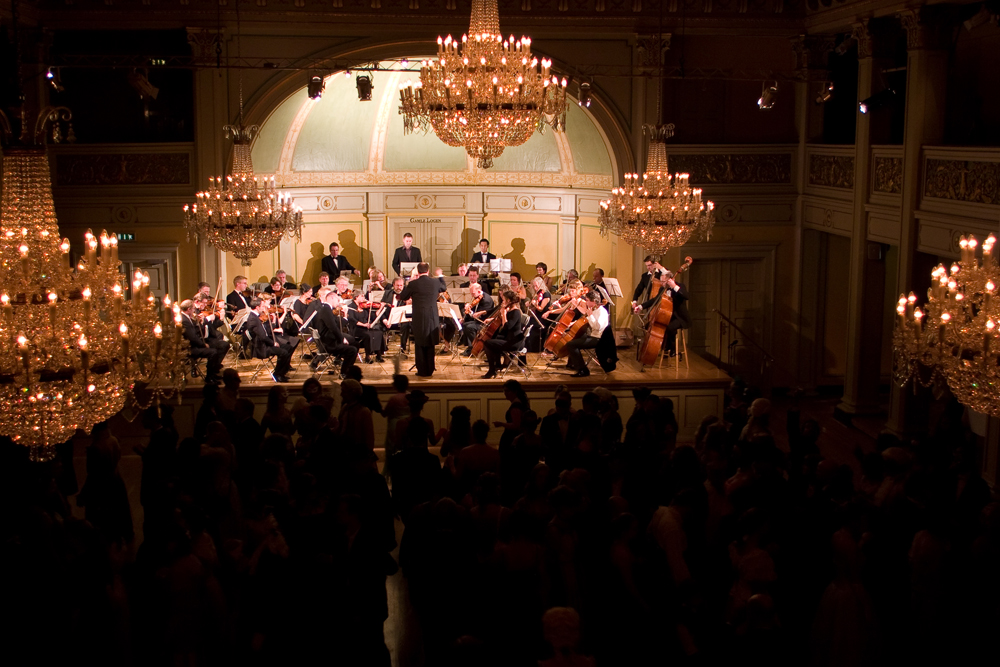
- Oslo Symphony Orchestra has played at the Operaballs since 1992.
- Status: Active
- Genre: Opera Festival
- Date: One day in February
- Begins: 4 February 2023
- Ends: 5 February 2023
- Frequency: Annually
- Venue: Gamle Logen
- Location: Oslo
- Country: Norway
- Years active: 1988 – present
- Attendance: 6-800
- Area: Oslo centre
- Major events: Ballroom
- Member: Tårnseilerne
- Website: operaballet.no

The annual Operaball is a masquerade with live performances held in Oslo, Norway, by the Tårnseilerne association (Swift) since 1988. The Operaball merged with Oslo Opera Festival in 2004 for a week of concerts and performances with Opera and classical music.

== History ==
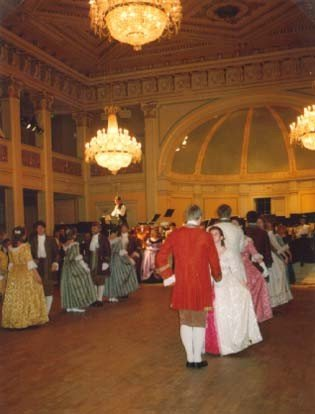
Period dance at the Oslo Operaball in 1990

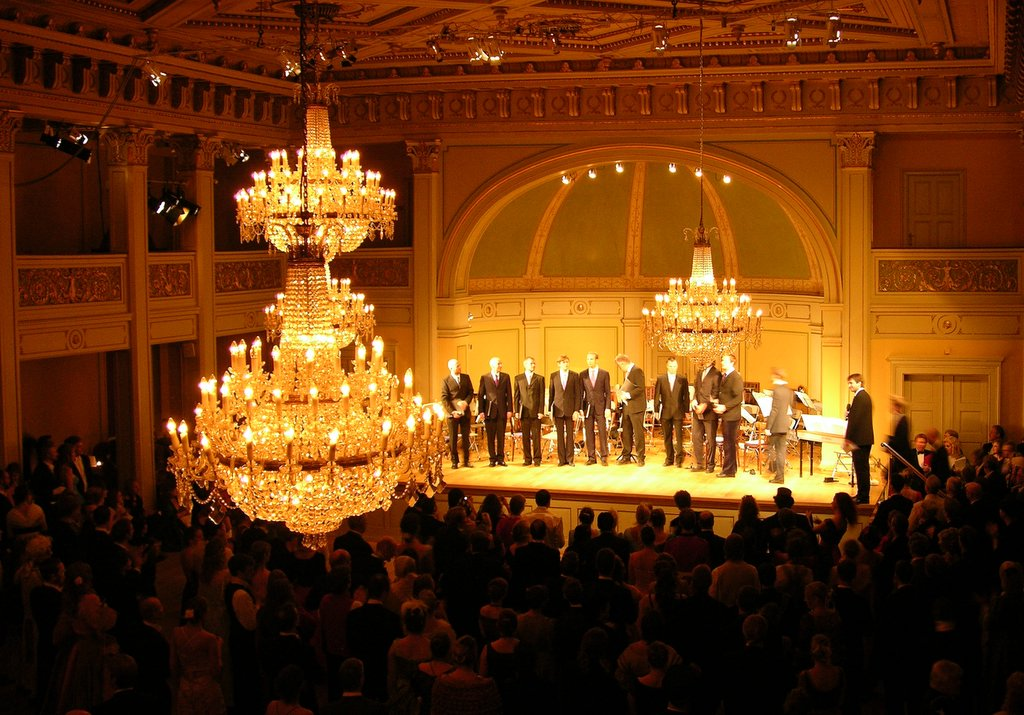
Operaball in Oslo 2005

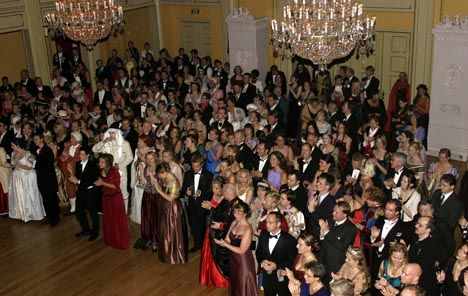
Operaball in Oslo 2004

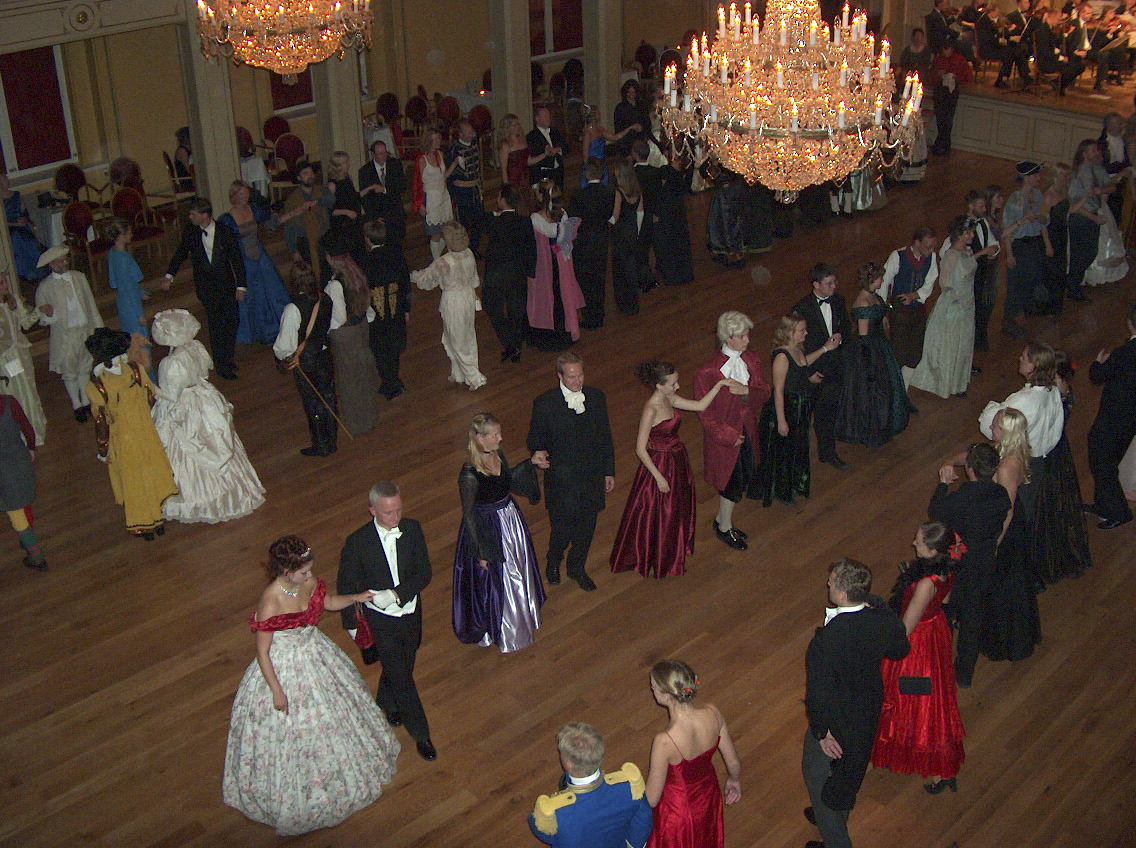
Operaball in Oslo 2003

The balls have been period historical costume or masquerade balls and have been held in the historical Gamle Logen. The old Freemasons Lodge in Oslo was renovated in 1989, but housed similar events in Christiania throughout the 19th century attended by some of Norway's most famous composers and artists – such as Edvard Grieg, Halfdan Kjerulf, Johan Svendsen, etc. Participants have first attended an Opera performance at the national opera house, then walk in a costume or carnival procession with horse-drawn carts through the historical centre of Oslo to the historical former freemasons Lodge. Then follows parallel performances and dance in up to six different halls with several orchestras and groups of musicians. All participants are invited to two evenings of rehearsals in historical dances, such as the menuett, mazurka, francaise, lanciers, galopp and so forth. Lectures and information evenings inform about the period, culture and attires chosen as theme for the event.

The annual series have historical precedents since the 1850s in the same hall. There were annual masquerade balls in the Old Freemasons lodge, by the student association and later also by the artist association in the carnival season in Christiania. These traditions are closesly related to the present Operaball in Oslo. Several compositions have been written for these events, notably Johan Svendsens Festival Polonaise. Edvard Grieg has performed and held concerts in the freemasons lodge and one piano composition is called At the carnival.

The present series were initiated by Bjørn Einar Sakseid. His first full-scale ball required roccoco costumes with Mozart style wigs, powder, and white stockings. After the restoration and reopening of the old Freemasons Lodge, this ball series has been the largest event in this hall. The capacity is 600 people. After a gala performance a procession walks a historical route through the city streets Count to Wedel's Square and the freemasons Lodge. From 1988 to 2006 the performance was at the Norwegian Opera in Folketeaterbygningen, the new Opera House in Bjørvika opened in 2008. In 2007 and 2011 a mini-opera was held in the old freemasons Lodge.

== The Opera Ball ==
Operaballs have alternately been called Roccoco Ball, Mozart Ball, masquerade or Mask Balls, in 1992 it was a Leap Year Ball on 29 February. In 1998, there was an Operaball on Valentine's Day, with the Orchestra playing A midsummer Night's dream by Mendelssohn, and in 1993 there was also a Christiania Soirée, where the organizers held the first public ball at Akershus fortress since the Middle Ages.

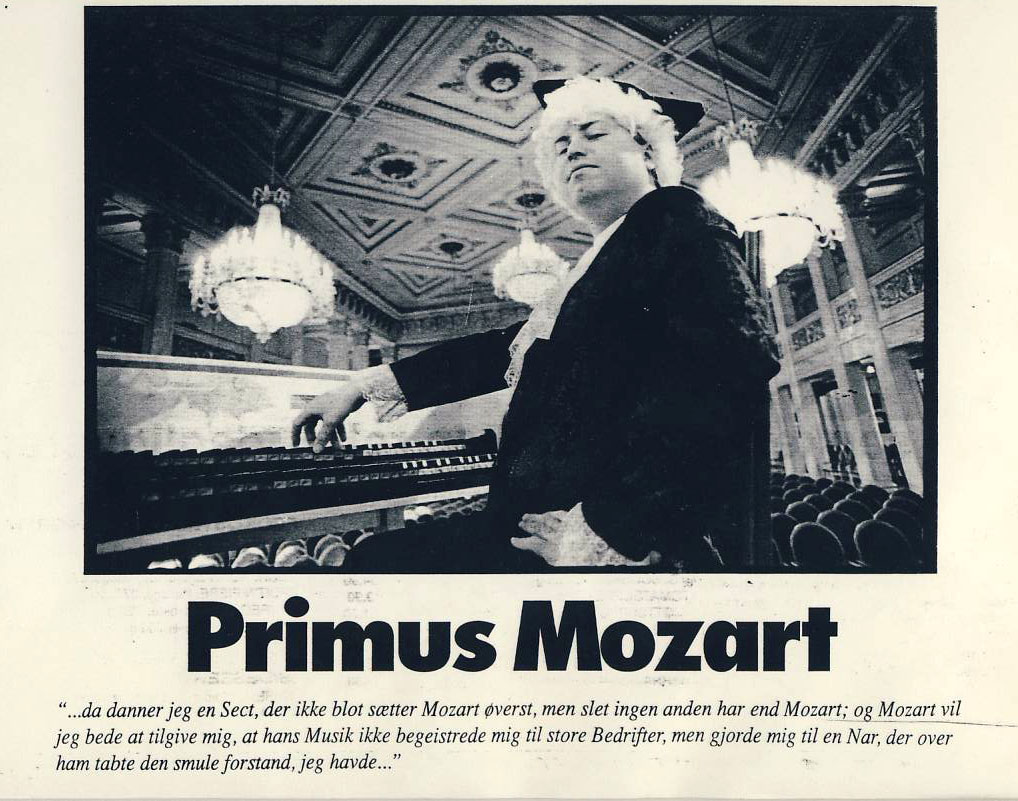
Bjørn Einar "Mozart" Sakseid

Bjørn Einar "Mozart" Sakseid The organizers of the Operaballs were first private initiatives by Bjørn Einar Sakseid with Christopher Brown (1988) and Tormod Carlsen (1989) among students at the University of Oslo. In 1990 the ball was part of the student week of the Norwegian student society led by Beatrice Johnson, from 1991 it was fronted by Jo Siri Ekgren and Signe Marie Hernes and in 1992 the Association Tårnseilerne (swift) was founded. In addition to the ball at the Old Freemasons lodge there have been balls in the Roccoco Halls at the Grand Hotel in Oslo in 1988, a Palace Ball at Akershus Castle in 1993 and a Fairytale Ball at Holmenkollen Park Hotel in 1995. The leader of the Operaballs (2004–2011), Gjørill Songvoll, received the City of Oslo's Culture Prize in 2010.

The Operaball in Oslo has inspired several similar balls, notably by the student society in Trondheim, the Jyske Opera in Denmark, the Opera house in Rostock, Germany and Copenhagen Opera House. These have visited, referred to and invited members of the Operaballs in Oslo to similar events. The Jutland Opera (den Jyske Opera) has organized several masquerade balls after visiting the Oslo Opera Ball and with participation from Oslo, with a masked Ball held on 5 February 2005. The first mask ball in Copenhagen modeled after the Operaball in Oslo was held on 18 February 2005 in the Royal Theatre and Molktes Palé.

== Historical costumes ==
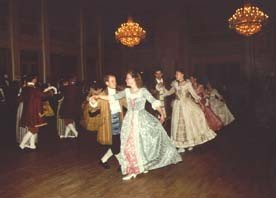
Operaball in Oslo 1990

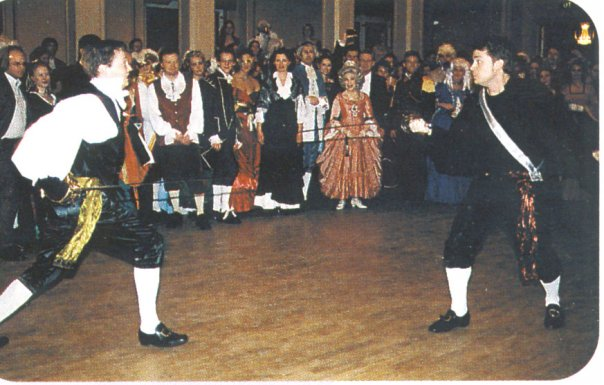
fencing performance at the Operaball in Oslo

Opera balls have held annual courses in costume sewing, costume managers have been Bente Iben Sandvik (1989–90), munkedamene with Emmy Gram, Stine Aasheim and Anne Solli (1991–93), Olaug Berg (1994–1998), Elizabeth Driveklepp and Anita Landre.
