= Polarjazz =

Jazz festival in Svalbard, Norway

The Polar Jazz Festival Polarjazz
- Status: Active
- Genre: Jazz Festival
- Date: Early February
- Begins: 31 January 2019
- Ends: 3 February 2019
- Frequency: Annually
- Locations: Longyearbyen, Svalbard
- Country: Norway
- Years active: 1998–present
- Website: www.polarjazz.no

Polarjazz or The Polar Jazz Festival (initiated 1998 in Longyearbyen, Svalbard) is the northernmost jazz festival in the world, and is arranged every year in February.

== Background ==
The 19th Polarjazz festival took place between 3 and 7 February 2016, with almost 2,500 visitors. Over the years, jazz performers and other musicians have visited Polarjazz. There is music for all ages, and therefore the festival includes performances in kindergartens, schools, and the youth house. Some musicians are sent to perform for our neighbors in the Russian settlement of Barentsburg.

== Artists and bands (in selection) ==
3–7 February 2011

- Hot Club de Norvege
- Solveig Slettahjell
- Beady Belle and PUST
- Halvdan Sivertsen
- Stian Carstensen

1–5 February 2012

- Bård Watn
- Bjelleklang
- Christianssands String Swing Ensemble
- DeLillos
- Kaizers Orchestra
- Maria Mena
- Ole Paus
- The Real Thing

31 January – 3 February 2013

- Kari Bremnes
- Madcon
- The Ukulele Orchestra of Great Britain
- Babylon Brothers
- Bargoo
- Sivert Høyem
- Howlin' Huskies

5–9 February 2014

- Mezzoforte
- Rypdal & Tekrø
- Stillhouse
- Urban Tunélls Klezmerband

5–8 February 2015

- Bo Kaspers Orkester
- Violet Road
- Vidar Johnsen
- Morten Abel
- Emilie Nicolas
- Bugge Wesseltoft & The Organ Club
- Árstíðir
- Nina & the Butterfly Fish
- Svalbard Kirkes Trio (World premiere)
- Solid Comfort
- Nora Konstanse

3–7 February 2015

- Per Mathisen and Ulf Wakenius
- Sondre Lerche
- Ingebjørg Bratland
- D'Sound
- Lyriaka
- SvaJazz
- Numa Edema
- Sofia Jannok – Susanne Sundfør
- Dos Mosquitos
- Longyearbyen Storband
- Hekla Stålstrenga
