= MaiJazz =

Jazz Festival in Stavanger, Norway

Stavanger International Jazz Festival
- Genre: Jazz
- Dates: May
- Location(s): Stavanger, Rogaland, Norway
- Coordinates: 58°57′48″N 05°43′08″E
- Years active: 1989–present
- Website: www.maijazz.no

MaiJazz is the Stavanger International Jazz Festival in Stavanger, Norway.

Since the first MaiJazz in 1989, the festival has presented both international and national musicians. About 200 volunteers organize 40 concerts on 20 venues in and around Stavanger for the 80 to 1800 people visiting MaiJazz. Musicians who have performed at the festival include Pat Metheny, Jan Garbarek, Gotan Project, Nils Petter Molvær, St. Germain, Dee Dee Bridgewater, Youssou N'dour, Joshua Redman, Chick Corea, Herbie Hancock, and Bobby McFerrin.

In 2014, acts included Pat Metheny, Tierney Sutton, Lizz Wright, Ron Carter, Arild Andersen, Nik Bartsch, Tord Gustavsen, Phil McDermott's Crossing Borders, NOCZ, Pixel, In the Country with poet Frode Grytten, JøKleBa, The Thing, Mario Piacentini Sextet featuring Gianluigi Trovesi
