= 2015 in jazz =

- Decade: 2010s in jazz
- Music: 2015 in music
- Standards: List of jazz standards
- See also: 2014 in jazz – 2016 in jazz

This is a timeline documenting events of jazz in the year 2015.

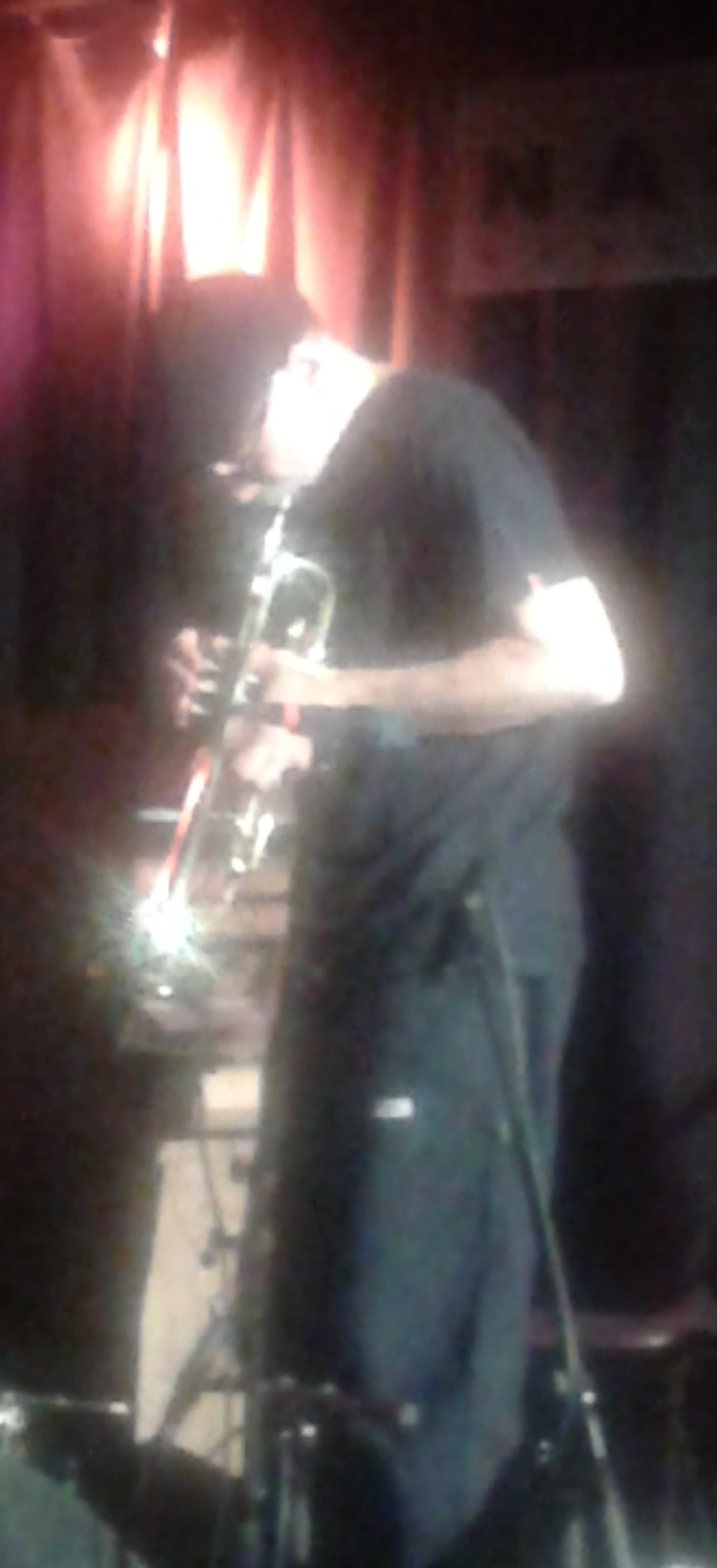
Per Jørgensen at Nattjazz 2015.

== Events ==
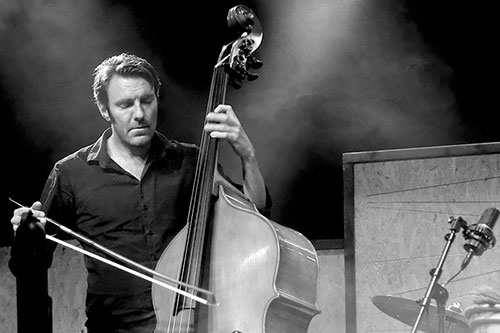
Mats Eilertsen at Aarhus Jazz Festival, Denmark July 2015.

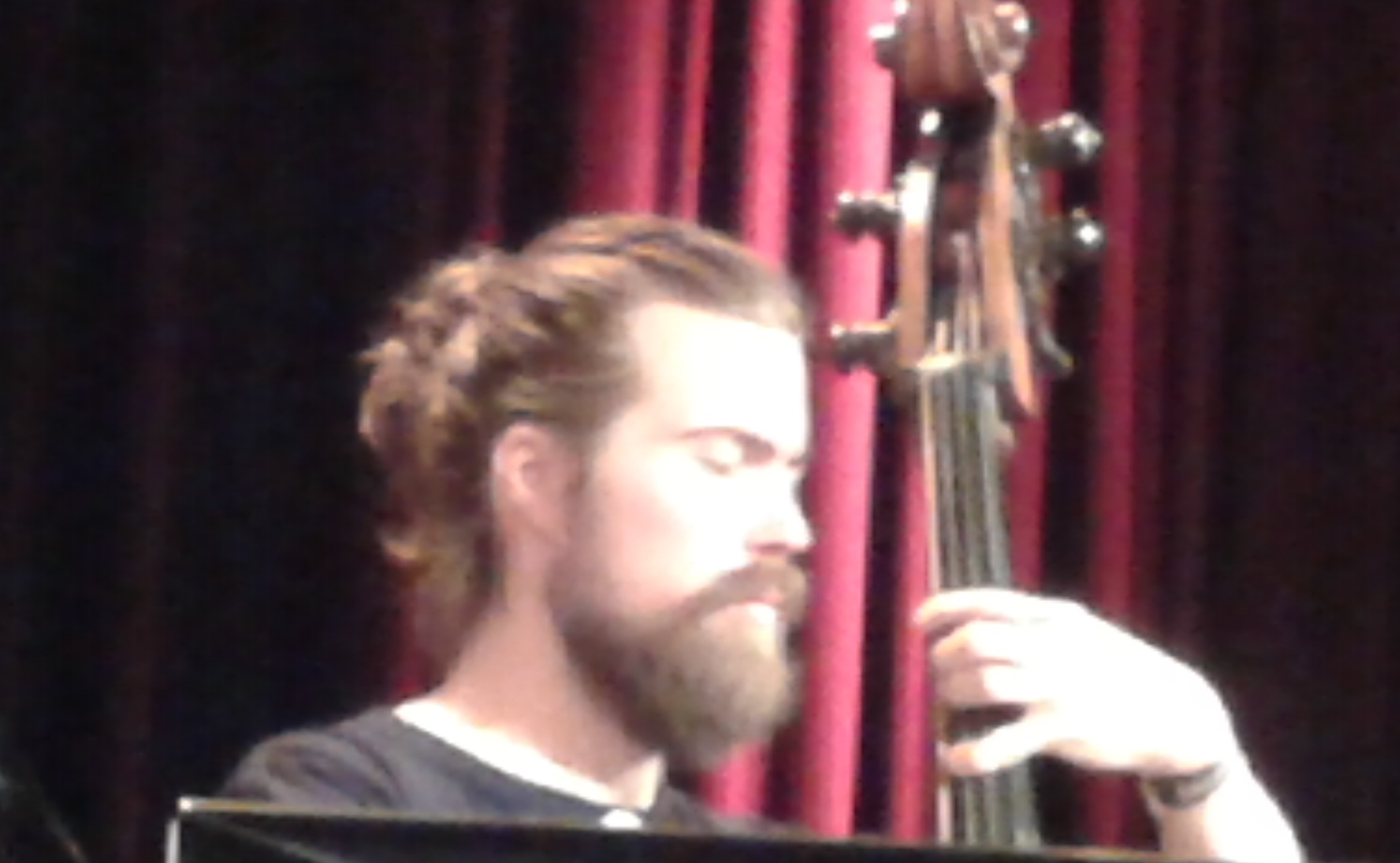
Christian Meaas Svendsen at Nattjazz 2015.

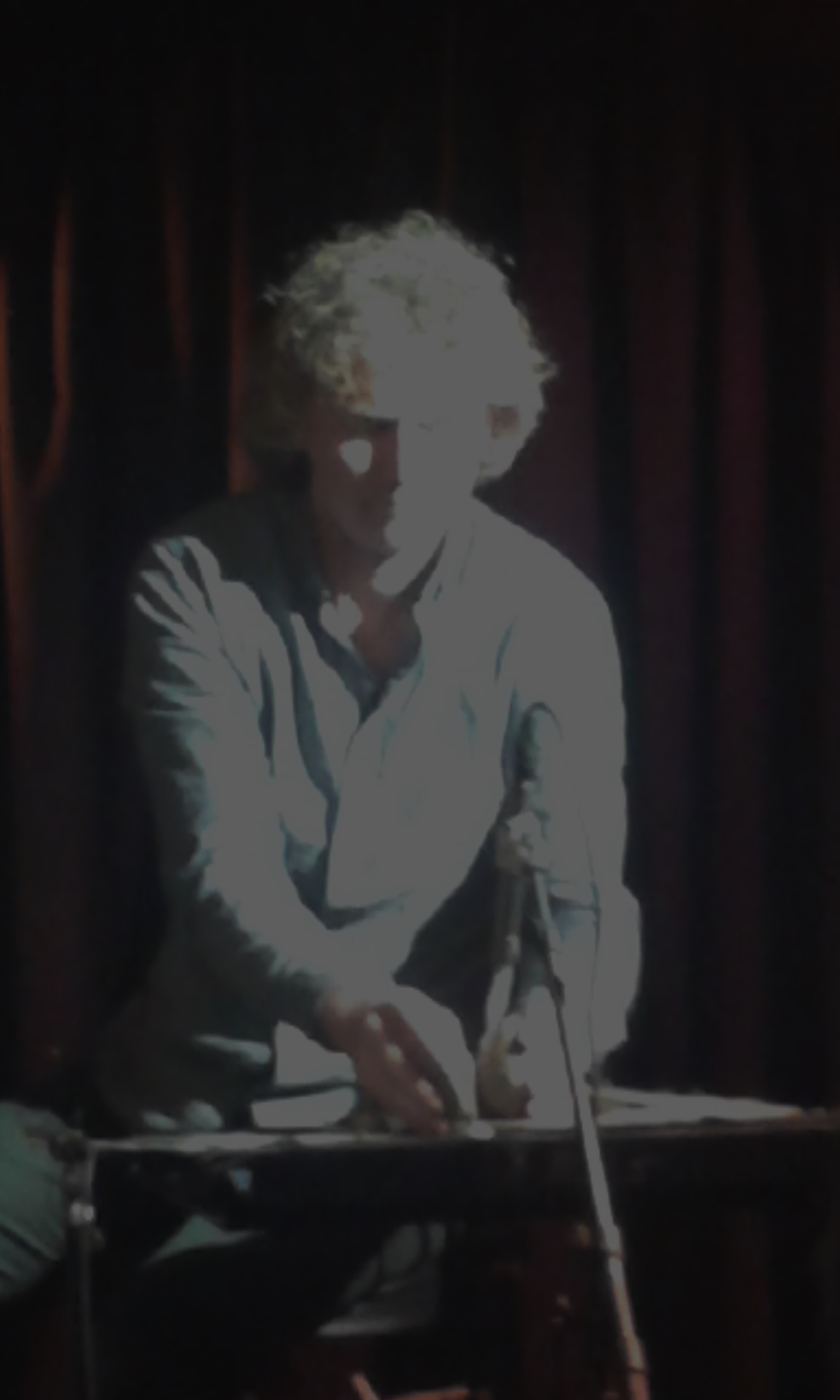
Terje Isungset at Nattjazz 2015.

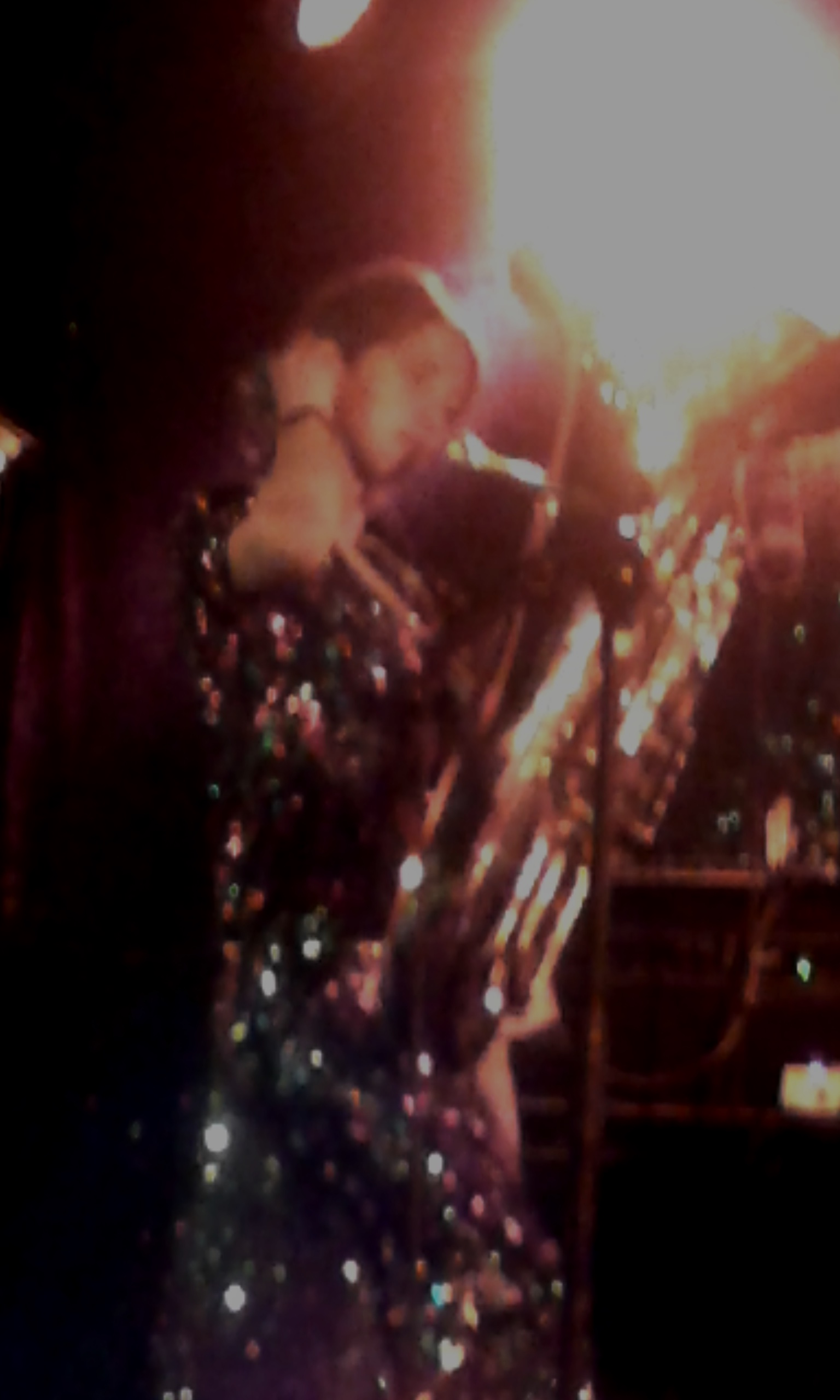
Heida Mobeck at Nattjazz 2015.

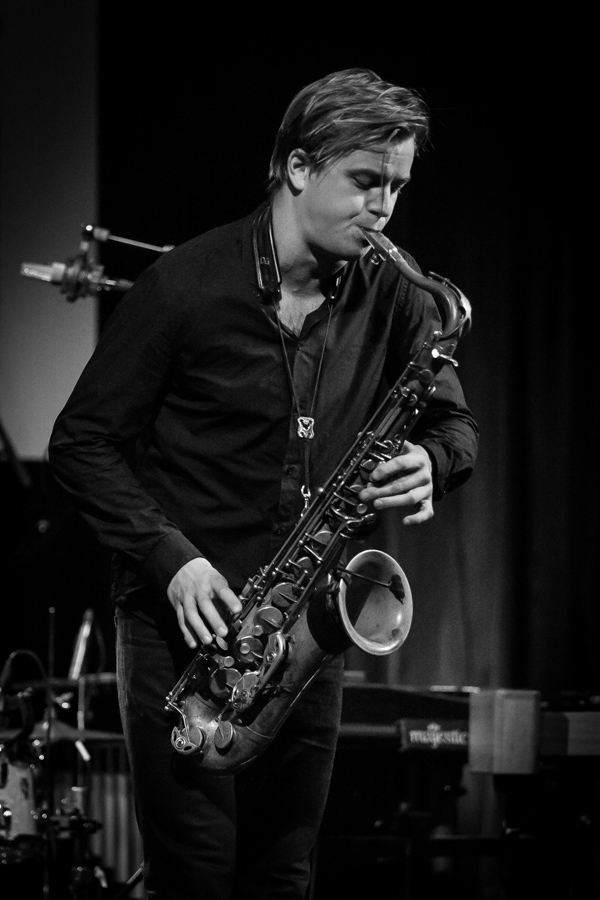
Marius Neset at Oslo Jazzfestival 2015.

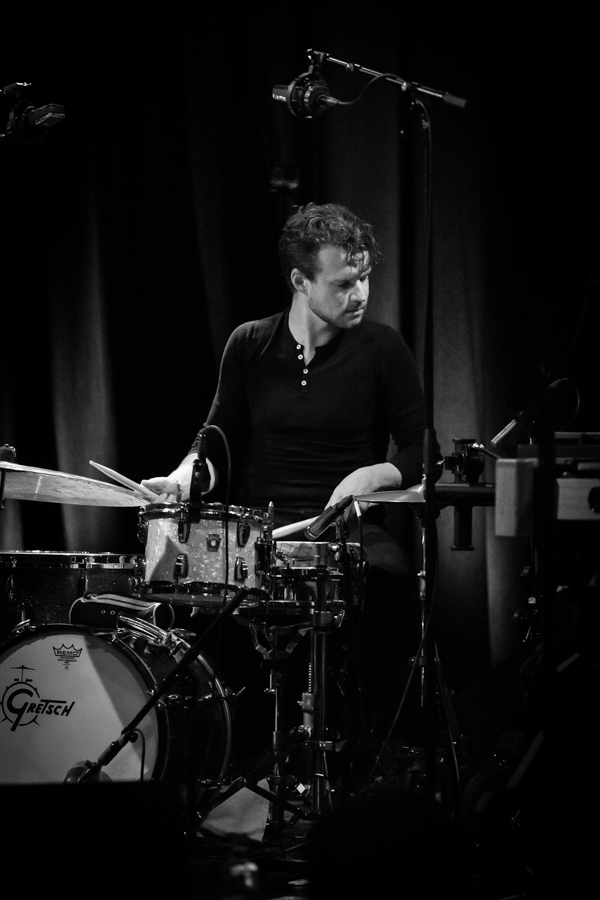
Anton Eger at Oslo Jazzfestival 2015.

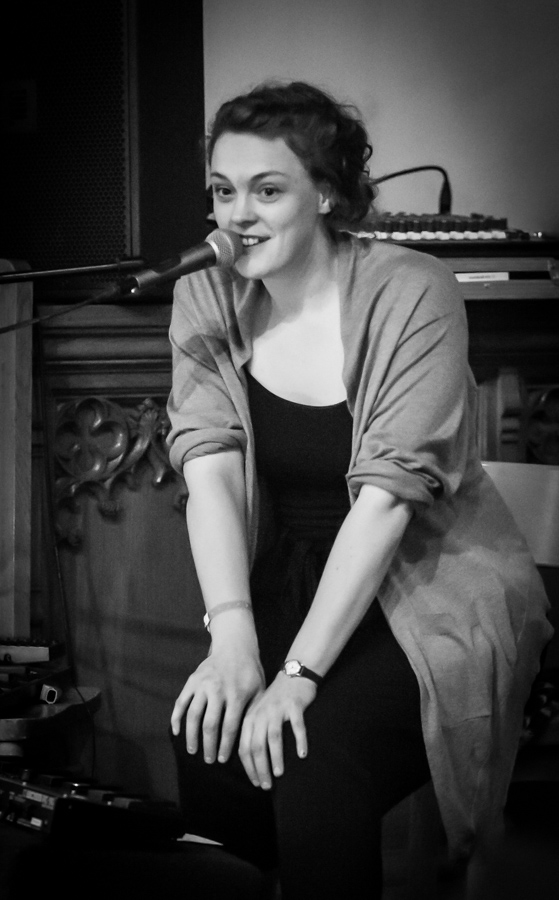
Mari Kvien Brunvoll at Oslo Jazzfestival 2015.

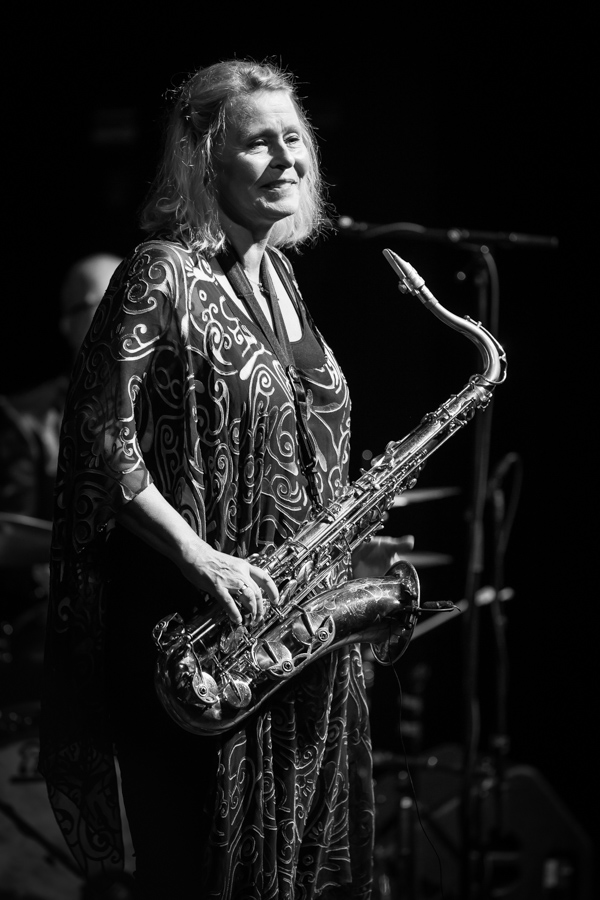
Bodil Niska at Oslo Jazzfestival 2015.

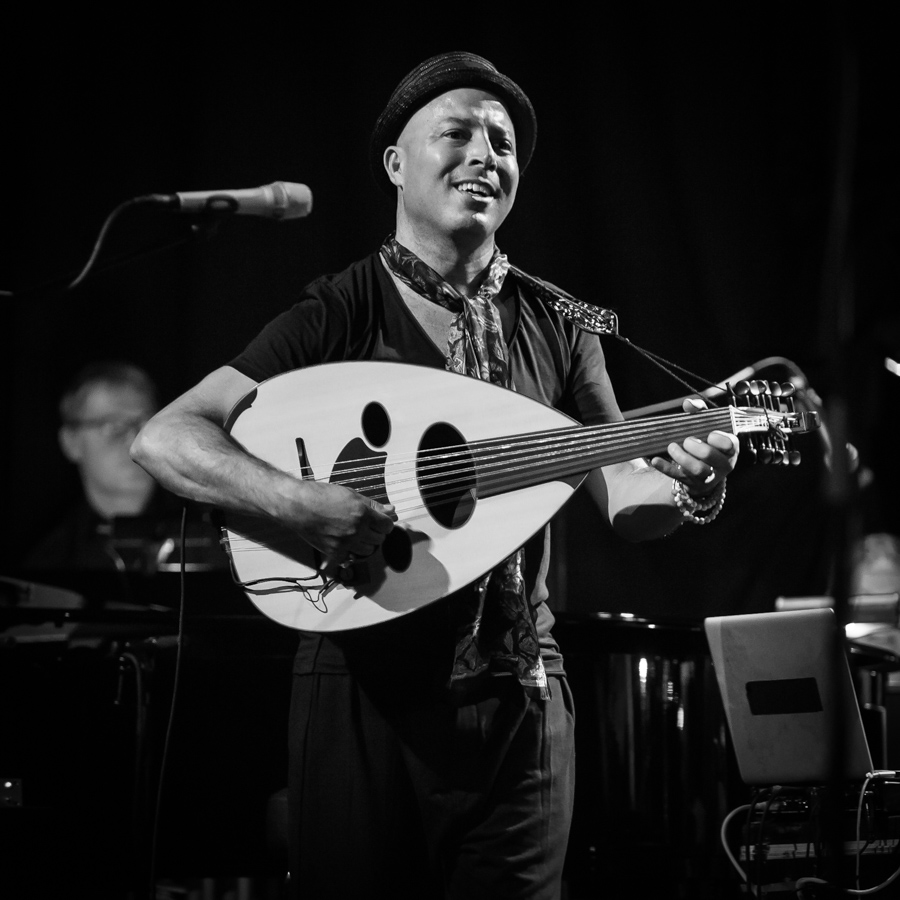
Dhafer Youssef at Oslo Jazzfestival 2015.

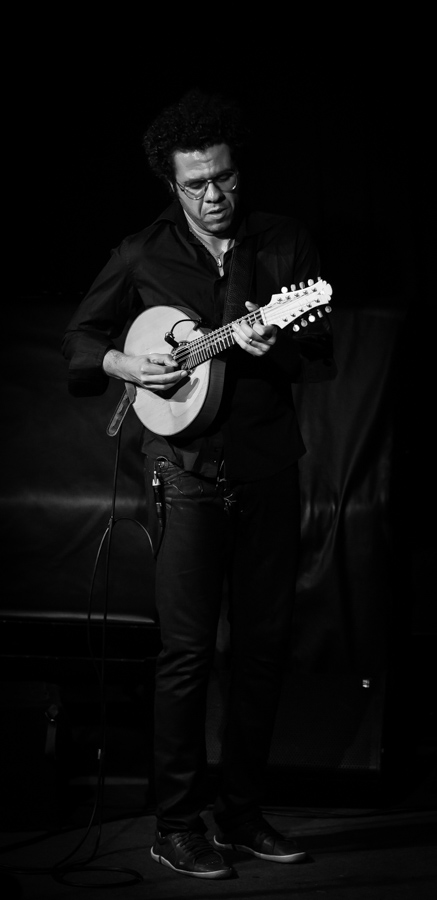
Hamilton de Holanda at Oslo Jazzfestival 2015.

=== January ===
- 21 – The 4th Bodø Jazz Open started in Bodø, Norway (January 21 – 24).
- 23 – The 34th annual Djangofestival started on Cosmopolite in Oslo, Norway (January 23 – 24).

=== February ===
- 5
  - The 17th Polarjazz Festival started in Longyearbyen, Svalbard (February 5 – 8).
  - The 10th Ice Music Festival started in Geilo, Norway (February 5 – 8).

=== March ===
- 6 – The 11th Jakarta International Java Jazz Festival started in Jakarta, Indonesia (March 6 – 8).
- 27 – The 42nd Vossajazz started in Voss Municipality, Norway (March 27 – 29).
- 28
  - Thea Hjelmeland was awarded Vossajazzprisen 2015 for the album Solar Plexus.
  - Live Maria Roggen performs the commissioned work Apukaluptein at Vossajazz.

=== April ===
- 2 - GoGo Penguin signs with Blue Note Records
- 23 – The 21st SoddJazz started in Inderøy, Norway (April 23 – 27).
- 30 – The International Jazz Day.

=== May ===
- 5 – The 27th MaiJazz started in Stavanger, Norway (May 5 – 10).
- 6 – The 11th AnJazz started in Hamar, Norway (May 6 – 9).
- 7
  - Julie Dahle Aagård played at Uhørt in Oslo, Norway.
  - Lisa Ekdahl play at Rockefeller in Oslo, Norway.
  - Bergen Big Band with Gabriel Fliflet and Ole Hamre played at Sardinen USF in Bergen, Norway.
  - The 37th Trondheim Jazz Festival started in Trondheim, Norway (May 7 – 10).
- 8
  - Per Mathisen Trio played at Draaben Bar in Sandefjord, Norway.
  - Hanna Paulsberg Concept / Soil Collectors / MOPO played at Victoria - Nasjonal Jazzscene Oslo, Norway.
- 10 – Kampenjazz: Anja Eline Skybakmoen played at Cafeteatret Oslo, Norway.
- 15 – Per Mathisen Trio played at Victoria - National Jazz Scene in Oslo, Norway.
- 16 – Farmers Market played at Victoria - National Jazz Scene in Oslo, Norway.
- 22
  - The 44th Moers Festival starts in Moers, Germany (May 22 – 25)
  - Eivind Opsvik Overseas played at Victoria - National Jazz Scene in Oslo, Norway.
- 23 – Beady Belle played at Victoria - National Jazz Scene in Oslo, Norway.
- 28
  - The 4th Torino Jazz Festival started in Turin (May 28 - June 2).
  - The 43rd Nattjazz 2015 started in Bergen, Norway (May 28 – June 6)
  - Bergen Big Band was the very first recipients of Olav Dale's Memorial Award at the opening of Nattjazz 2015.

=== June ===
- 17 – The 27th Jazz Fest Wien started in Vienna, Austria (June 26 – July 11).
- 26 – The 35th Montreal International Jazz Festival started in Montreal, Quebec, Canada (June 26 – July 5).

=== July ===
- 1
  - The 51st Kongsberg Jazzfestival started at Kongsberg, Norway (July 1 – 4).
  - Ellen Andrea Wang was recipient of the Kongsberg Jazz Award or DNB.prisen 2015 at the Kongsberg Jazzfestival.
- 2
  - The 15th Stavernfestivalen started in Stavern, Norway (July 2 – 4).
  - The 25th JazzBaltica starts in Schloss Salzau close to Kiel, Germany (July 2 – 5).
- 3
  - The 37th Copenhagen Jazz Festival started in Copenhagen, Denmark (July 3 – 12).
  - The 49th Montreux Jazz Festival started in Montreux, Switzerland (July 3 – 18).
- 7 – The 68th Nice Jazz Festival started in Nice, France (July 7 – 12).
- 10 – The 40th North Sea Jazz Festival started in Rotterdam, Netherlands (July 10 – 12).
- 11
  - The 27th Aarhus Jazz Festival started in Aarhus, Denmark (July 11 – 18).
  - The 50th Pori Jazz Festival started in Pori, Finland (July 11 – 19).
- 13 – The 55th Moldejazz started in Molde, Norway with Mats Gustafsson as artist in residence (July 13 – 18).
- 16 – Jan Ole Otnæs received the 2015 Molderosen at Moldejazz.
- 22 – The 20th Canal Street started in Arendal, Norway (July 22 – 25).
- 31 – The 59th Newport Jazz Festival started in Newport, Rhode Island (July 31 – August 2).

=== August ===
- 5 – The 29th Sildajazz 2015 started in Haugesund, Norway (August 5 – 9).
- 6 – The 21st Hemnesjazz 2015 started in Hemnesberget, Norway (August 6 – 9).
- 8 – The 4th Kids in Jazz 2015 festival started in Oslo, Norway as part of the Oslo Jazzfestival (August 8 – 12).
- 10 – The 30th Oslo Jazzfestival started in Oslo, Norway (August 10 – 15).
- 11 – The 17th Øyafestivalen started in Oslo, Norway (August 11 – 15).
- 12 – Anneli Drecker played at Øyafestivalen.

=== September ===
- 3 – The 11th Punktfestivalen started in Kristiansand, Norway (September 3 – 5).
- 18 – The 58th Monterey Jazz Festival started in Monterey, California (September 18 – 20).

=== October ===
- 9 – The 32nd Stockholm Jazz Festival started in Stockholm, Sweden (October 9 – 18).
- 10 - Miles Ahead, a documentary about the life of Miles Davis releases

=== November ===
- 13 – The 24th London Jazz Festival started in London, England (November 13 – 22).

=== December ===
- 29 – The 10th RIBBEjazz started in Lillestrøm, Norway.

== Albums released ==
Month	Day	Album	Artist	Label	Notes	Ref.
January	13	Songs For Quintet	Kenny Wheeler	ECM	Produced by Manfred Eicher, Steve Lake. Recorded at Abbey Road Studios.	
January	16	Break Stuff	Vijay Iyer Trio	ECM	Produced by Manfred Eicher	
January	16	Imaginary Cities	Chris Potter Underground Orchestra	ECM	Produced by Manfred Eicher	
January	16	Made in Chicago	Jack DeJohnette	ECM	Produced by Dave Love, Jack DeJohnette	
January	22	Encore	Eberhard Weber	ECM	Live recordings 1990–2007	
January	20	Meditation	Terje Isungset	All Ice		
January	21	Nangijala	Andreas Loven	Losen		
January	30	Pinball	Marius Neset	ACT	Produced by Marius Neset and Anton Eger	
January	30	Bits & Pieces	Mopti feat. Bendik Baksaas	Jazzland	Produced by Bendik Baksaas, Christian M. Svendsen, Aleksander Sjølie, Harald Lassen	
February	3	Wallflower	Diana Krall	Verve Records	Produced by David Foster	
February	6	Gefion	Jakob Bro	ECM	Produced by Manfred Eicher	
February	6	The Half-finished Heaven	Sinikka Langeland	ECM	Produced by Manfred Eicher	
February	16	Ten Love Songs	Susanne Sundfør	Warner		
February	20	It´s OK To Play	Øystein Blix	Losen		
February	20	Phoenix	Cyminology	ECM	Produced by Manfred Eicher	
February	27	Midwest	Mathias Eick	ECM	Produced by Manfred Eicher	
February	27	Bird Calls	Rudresh Mahanthappa	ACT	Produced by Rudresh K. Mahanthappa	
March	6	A Clear Midnight (Kurt Weill And America)	Julia Hülsmann Quartet with Theo Bleckmann	ECM	Produced by Manfred Eicher	
March	6	Trees Of Light	Anders Jormin / Lena Willemark / Karin Nakagawa	ECM	Produced by Manfred Eicher	
March	17	Time Within Itself	Michael Waldrop Big Band / Jack Cooper / Jimi Tunnell	Origin	Produced by Michael Waldrop	
March	20	Grieg, Tveitt & I	Dag Arnesen	Coco & Co		
March	20	In Maggiore	Paolo Fresu / Daniele di Bonaventura	ECM	Produced by Manfred Eicher	
March	20	This Is The Day	Giovanni Guidi Trio	ECM	Produced by Manfred Eicher	
March	22	Hit The Wall!	Mats Gustafsson together with Thurston Moore	Smalltown Superjazzz		
March	23	Lucidity	Atomic	Jazzland	Produced by Atomic, co-producer Sten Nilsen	
March	24	Duets	Stanley Jordan, Kevin Eubanks	Mack Avenue		
March	27	Kjølvatn	Nils Økland Band including Rolf-Erik Nystrøm, Sigbjørn Apeland and Mats Eilertsen	ECM		
March	27	Slow Eastbound Train	Daniel Herskedal	Edition	Produced by Erik Johannessen	
March	27	Young At Heart	Ida Sand	ACT	Produced by Nils Landgren, executive producer Siggi Loch	
April	7	Vol. 3	Team Hegdal	Particular Recordings		
April	17	Dallëndyshe	Elina Duni Quartet	ECM	Produced by Manfred Eicher	
April	17	Én	Duplex	NorCD		
April	17	En Konsert For Folk Flest	Motorpsycho + Ståle Storløkken	Rune Grammofon		
April	17	Surrounded By Sea	Andy Sheppard Quartet	ECM	Produced by Manfred Eicher	
April	17	You've Been Watching Me	Tim Berne's Snakeoil	ECM	Produced by Manfred Eicher	
April	24	Rocks & Straws	Anneli Drecker, lyrics based on poems by Arvid Hanssen	Rune Grammofon		
April	24	Slow Snow	Tore Brunborg	ACT	Produced by Tore Brunborg	
May	1	Terje Isungset & Stian Westerhus	Terje Isungset, Stian Westerhus	All Ice		
May	4	Only Sky	David Torn	ECM	Produced by David Torn	
May	5	The Epic	Kamasi Washington	Brainfeeder		
May	8	Barber / Bartók / Jarrett	Keith Jarrett	ECM		
May	8	Creation	Keith Jarrett	ECM		
May	8	Now This	Gary Peacock Trio	ECM	Produced by Manfred Eicher	
May	9	Ospitalita Generosa	Per Mathiesen Trio	Alessa		
May	15	The Goldilocks Zone	Olga Konkova Trio	Losen		
May	19	Firehouse	Gard Nilssen's Acoustic Unity including with Petter Eldh and André Roligheten	Clean Feed		
May	22	Imágenes (Music For Piano)	Dino Saluzzi - Horacio Lavandera	ECM		
May	26	The Bad Plus Joshua Redman	The Bad Plus and Joshua Redman	Nonesuch Records		
May	29	Jazzpaña	Gerardo Núñez live with Ulf Wakenius	ACT	Recording producer Christoph Terbuyken	
June	1	Starfire	Jaga Jazzist	Ninja Tune		
June	3	Weathering	Kvien & Sommer	Full Of Nothing		
June	5	Rainy Omen	Finland (Morten Qvenild, Ivar Grydeland, Jo Berger Myhre, Pål Hausken)	Hubro		
June	12	Amores Pasados	John Potter	ECM	Produced by Manfred Eicher	
June	16	Space Time Continuum	Aaron Diehl	Mack Avenue	Produced by Maria Ehreneich	
June	26	Nomad Songs	Stephan Micus	ECM		
July	21	Bugge & Friends	Bugge Wesseltoft	Jazzland		
July	24	Tears Of The World	Knut Reiersrud & Mighty Sam McClain	ACT	Produced by Knut Reiersrud and Nikolai Hængsle Eilertsen	
August	11	Individuals Facing the Terror of Cosmic Loneliness	Stein Urheim and Mari Kvien Brunvoll	Jazzland		
August	21	Silver Mountain	Elephant9	Rune Grammofon		
August	21	Vårres Egen Lille Krig	Vidar Vang	VV Records		
August	28	Bridges	Adam Baldych & Helge Lien Trio	ACT	Mixed and mastered by Klaus Scheuermann	
August	28	Just The Two Of Us	Cæcilie Norby and Lars Danielsson	ACT		
August	28	In The Morning (Music Of Alec Wilder)	Stefano Battaglia Trio	ECM	Produced by Manfred Eicher, Torino Jazz Festival	
August	28	Time Before And Time After	Dominique Pifarély	ECM	Produced by Manfred Eicher	
August	28	Wild Dance	Enrico Rava Quartet with Gianluca Petrella	ECM	Produced by Manfred Eicher	
September	2	Buoyancy	Nils Petter Molvær	Okeh Records	Produced by Jo Berger Myhre, Nils Petter Molvær	
September	2	Bushman's Fire	Bushman's Revenge	Rune Grammofon		
September	2	Jazz, Fritt Etter Hukommelsen	Bushman's Revenge	Rune Grammofon		
September	4	For One to Love	Cécile McLorin Salvant	Mack Avenue	Produced by Al Pryor	
September	4	Luys i Luso	Tigran Hamasyan with Yerevan State Choir conducted by Harutyun Topikyan	ECM	Produced by Manfred Eicher	
September	4	Personal Piano	Morten Qvenild	Hubro		
September	6	Ville Ord	Frida Ånnevik	Grappa	Recipient of the Spellemannprisen lyricist award	
September	11	Hommage À Eberhard Weber	Pat Metheny, Jan Garbarek, Gary Burton, Scott Colley, Danny Gottlieb, Paul McCandless, Michael Gibbs, Helge Sunde, and SWR Big Band	ECM		
September	11	When You Cut Into The Present	Møster!	Hubro		
September	16	Sunrain	Haakon Graf Trio, including Erik Smith and Per Mathisen	Losen Records	Produces by Graf, Smith, and Mathisen	
September	18	Echo	Anja Eline Skybakmoen	Triogram		
September	18	Megalodon	Megalodon Collective including with Henrik Lødøen	Gigafon		
September	18	Waldemar 4	Trygve Waldemar Fiske	Gigafon		
September	25	Circadian Rhythm And Blues	Hayden Powell	Periskop Records		
September	25	Mønster	Espen Berg Trio	Atterklang	Produced by Espen Berg Trio. AKLANG314	
September	25	Past Present	John Scofield	Impulse!		
September	25	The String Project	Philip Catherine live in Brussels	ACT	Produced by Philip Catherine	
October	2	Return to the Fire	Tim Garland	Edition		
October	2	Chiaroscuro	Giya Kancheli	ECM	Produced by Manfred Eicher	
October	2	Time Is A Blind Guide	Thomas Strønen	ECM	Produced by Sun Chung, Thomas Strønen	
October	8	JazzBukkBox a box with three albums: Lærad The Tree, Live in Germany and WorldJazz	Karl Seglem	NorCD		
October	9	Band Of Gold	Band Of Gold including Nikolai Hængsle Eilertsen and Nina Elisabeth Mortvedt	Jansen Plateproduksjon		
October	9	Nachtfahrten	Michael Wollny	ACT	Produced by Siggi Loch	
October	12	Golden Years	Pixel	Cuneiform		
October	30	Mette Henriette	Mette Henriette	ECM		
October	30	Winter Light	Scott DuBois	ACT	Produced by Scott DuBois	
October	31	Cubistic Boogie	David Arthur Skinner	Losen	Produced by David Arthur Skinner, executive producer Odd Gjelsnes	
November	6	This Is Not A Miracle	Food	ECM		
November	12	Aimless Mary	Needlepoint	BJK Music		
November	20	Pieces Of Solitude	Natalie Sandtorv	Va Fongool		
November	20	Trail of Souls	Solveig Slettahjell with Knut Reiersrud and In The Country	ACT		
November	27	The Day I Had Everything	Malija including Mark Lockheart, Liam Noble, and Jasper Høiby	Edition		
November	27	Just The Two Of Us	Cæcilie Norby with Lars Danielsson	ACT	Produced by Cæcilie Norby & Lars Danielsson, executive producer Siggi Loch	
November	27	Time Is Coming	Hildegunn Øiseth	Losen		
December	1	Before the Storm	Nakama	Nakama Records	Produced by Nakama & Christian Obermayer	
December	5	Love Swings	Ike Moriz	Mosquito Records London Pty Ltd.	Recorded at Paris Studios, Cape Town	

== Deaths ==
January

- 1 – Jeff Golub, American guitarist (born 1955).
- 3 – Ivan Jullien, French trumpeter (born 1934).
- 4 – Pino Daniele, Italian singer, songwriter, and guitarist (born 1955).
- 19 – Ward Swingle, American vocalist and pianist, The Swingle Singers (born 1927).

February

- 3 – William Thomas McKinley, American composer and pianist (born 1938).
- 12 – Richie Pratt, American drummer (born 1943).
- 21 – Clark Terry, American trumpeter (born 1920).
- 22 – Erik Amundsen, Norwegian upright bassist (born 1937).

March

- 8 – Lew Soloff, American trumpeter, composer, and actor (born 1944).
- 13 – Daevid Allen, Australian poet, guitarist, singer, composer, and performance artist, Soft Machine and Gong (born 1938).
- 15
  - Bob Parlocha, American saxophonist and gourmet cook (born 1938).
  - Mike Porcaro, American bassist, Toto (born 1955).
- 20 – Paul Jeffrey, American tenor saxophonist, arranger, and educator (born 1933).
- 21 – Jørgen Ingmann, Danish guitarist (born 1925).
- 26 – John Renbourn, English guitarist and songwriter (born 1944).
- 27 – Johnny Helms, American trumpeter and bandleader (born 1935).
- 31 – Ralph Sharon, Anglo-American pianist and arranger (born 1923).

April

- 6 – Milton DeLugg, American pianoist, accordionist, and composer (born 1918).
- 27 – Marty Napoleon, American pianist (born 1921).

May

- 3 – Ben Aronov, American pianist (born 1932).
- 6 – Jerome Cooper, American drummer (born 1946).
- 14 – B.B. King, American guitarist (born 1925).
- 20
  - Bob Belden, American saxophonist (born 1956).
  - Simon Flem Devold, Norwegian clarinetist and columnist (born 1927).
- 23 – Marcus Belgrave, American trumpeter (born 1936).
- 28 – Ray Kennedy, American pianist (born 1957).
- 31 – Slim Richey, American guitarist (born 1938).

June

- 8 – Paul Bacon, American musician and book and album cover designer (born 1923).
- 9 – James Last, German composer and big band leader, James Last Orchestra (born 1929).
- 11 – Ornette Coleman, American saxophonist (born 1930).
- 12 – Monica Lewis, American singer and actress (born 1922).
- 13 – Big Time Sarah, American singer (born 1953).
- 19 – Harold Battiste, American saxophonist, pianist, and composer (born 1931).
- 21 – Gunther Schuller, American composer, conductor, and horn player (born 1925).
- 30 – Eddy Louiss, French Hammond organist, Les Double Six (born 1941).

July

- 6 – Masabumi Kikuchi, Japanese jazz pianist and composer (born 1939).
- 15 – Howard Rumsey, American upright bassist (born 1917).
- 17 – John Taylor, British pianist and composer (born 1942).
- 19 – Van Alexander, American bandleader, arranger, and composer (born 1915).

August

- 13 – Harold Ousley, American tenor saxophonist and flautist (born 1929).
- 14 – Jazz Summers, British music manager (lung cancer), Scissor Sisters, The Verve, and Snow Patrol (born 1944).
- 30 – Hugo Rasmussen, Danish bassist (born 1941).

September

- 27 – Wilton Felder, American saxophonist and bassist, The Crusaders (born 1940).
- 29 – Phil Woods, American saxophonist, clarinetist, bandleader and composer (born 1931).

October

- 3 – Dave Pike, American vibraphone and marimba player (born 1938).
- 9 – Larry Rosen, American drummer, entrepreneur, and music producer (born 1940).
- 20 – Don Rendell, English saxophonist, flautist, and clarinetist (born 1926).
- 22 – Mark Murphy, American singer (born 1932).
- 24 – Nat Peck, American trombonist (born 1925).

November

- 5
  - Kjell Öhman, Swedish pianist, hammond organist, and accordionist (born 1943).
  - Nora Brockstedt, Norwegian singer (born 1923).
- 9 – Andy White, Scottish drummer (born 1930).
- 17 – Al Aarons, American trumpeter (born 1932).
- 23
  - Bengt-Arne Wallin, Swedish composer, arrangeur, trumpeter, and flugelhornist (born 1926).
  - Cynthia Robinson, American trumpeter and vocalist, Sly and the Family Stone (born 1944).
- 25 – Svein Christiansen, Norwegian drummer (born 1941).

December

- 9 – Rusty Jones, American drummer (born 1942).
- 28 – Joe Houston, American tenor saxophonist (born 1926).
- 31
  - Natalie Cole, American singer, songwriter, and actress (congestive heart failure) (born 1950).
  - Dal Richards, Canadian big band leader (born 1918).

== See also ==
- List of 2015 albums
- List of years in jazz
- 2010s in jazz
- 2015 in music
