= 2010s in jazz =

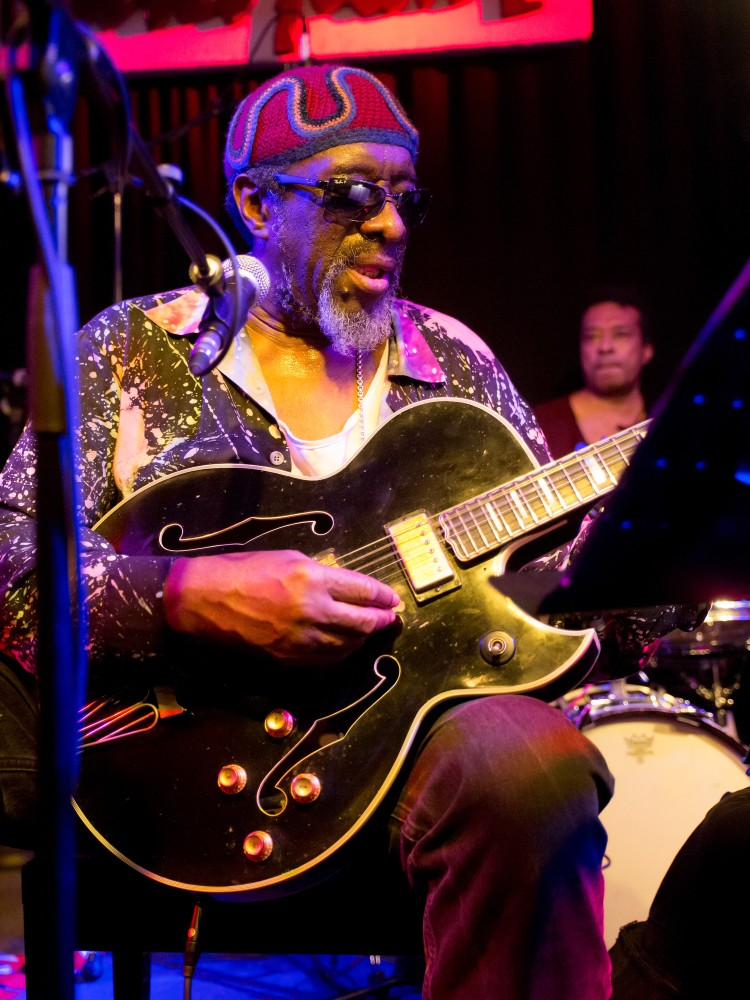
James Blood Ulmer Black Rock Experience at Jazz club Unterfahrt in 2013.

In the 2010s in jazz, there was a noted resurgence in the popularity of jazz, particularly in the United Kingdom, where new artists rose to prominence such as Sons of Kemet, Shabaka Hutchings, Ezra Collective, and Moses Boyd Young audiences overall also listened jazz moreso than before, with streaming services reporting a spike amongst people under 30. Part of this is attributed to the rise of streaming services, and part to fusions with other genres and collaborations between jazz musicians and popular artists in other genres, such as Kamasi Washington's work with Kendrick Lamar

In the 21st century, a number of young musicians emerged, including American drummer Makaya McCraven, saxophonist Kamasi Washington, Norwegian pianists Tord Gustavsen and Helge Lien, guitarist David Aleksander Sjølie, vibraphonist Andreas Mjøs, trumpeters Mathias Eick and Hayden Powell, saxophonists Marius Neset, Frøy Aagre, and Mette Henriette, and bassist Ellen Andrea Wang.

Well-established jazz musicians, such as Wayne Shorter, John Scofield, Jan Garbarek, Pat Metheny, Jon Balke, Brad Mehldau, Olga Konkova, Ulf Wakenius, Christian McBride, Per Mathisen, and Renaud Garcia Fons, continued to perform and record.

== 2010 ==
=== Album releases ===
- Herbie Hancock: The Imagine Project (Hancock Music)
- Pat Metheny: Orchestrion (Nonesuch)
- Jan Garbarek and The Hilliard Ensemble: Officium Novum (ECM)
- Oliver Lake Organ Quartet: Plan (Passin' Thru)
- Jeff Beck: Emotion & Commotion (ATCO)
- Terje Rypdal: Crime Scene (ECM)
- Paolo Vinaccia featuring Terje Rypdal, Ståle Storløkken and Palle Mikkelborg: Very Much Alive (Jazzland)
- Eivind Aarset's Sonic Codex Orchestra: Live Extracts (ECM)
- John McLaughlin: To the One (Abstract Logix)
- Haakon Graf with Per Mathisen and Erik Smith: License To Chill (Nordic)
- Dag Arnesen Trio: Norwegian Song 3 (Losen)
- Tore Johansen featuring Steve Swallow: I.S. (Inner Ear)
- Motorpsycho:Heavy Metal Fruit (Rune Grammofon)
- Atomic: Theater Tilters Vol 1 (Jazzland)
- Atomic: Theater Tilters Vol 2 (Jazzland)
- Eple Trio: In The Clearing / In The Cavern (NorCD)
- Daniel Herskedal: City Stories (NorCD)
- Trio 3 (Oliver Lake, Reggie Workman & Andrew Cyrille) + Geri Allen: Celebrating Mary Lou Williams (Intakt)
- Jeff Beck: Live and Exclusive from the Grammy Museum (ATCO)
- Stanley Clarke: The Stanley Clarke Band (Heads Up)
- World Saxophone Quartet: Yes We Can (Jazzwerkstatt)

=== Deaths ===
- Dick Johnson (December 1, 1925 – January 10), American big band clarinetist
- John Dankworth (September 20, 1927 – February 6), English saxophonist, clarinetist and composer
- Tony Campise (January 22, 1943 – March 7), American saxophonist
- Herb Ellis (August 4, 1921 – March 28), American guitarist
- Lena Horne (June 30, 1917 – May 9), American singer
- Hank Jones (July 31, 1918 – May 16), American pianist, bandleader, arranger, and composer
- Kristian Bergheim (June 6, 1926 – May 30), Norwegian saxophonist
- Abbey Lincoln (August 6, 1930 – August 14), American singer
- James Moody (March 26, 1925 – December 9), American saxophonist
- Captain Beefheart (January 15, 1941 – December 17), American singer
- Billy Taylor (July 24, 1921 – December 28), American pianist

== 2011 ==
=== Album releases ===
- Renaud Garcia-Fons: Méditerranées (Enja)
- Corea, Clarke & White: Forever (Concord)
- Ole Mathisen, Per Mathisen and Paolo Vinaccia: Elastics (Losen)
- Susanna Wallumrød, lyrics by Gunvor Hofmo: Jeg Vil Hjem Til Menneskene (Grappa)
- John Scofield: A Moment's Peace (EmArcy)
- Pat Metheny: What's It All About (Nonesuch)
- Eliane Elias: Light My Fire (Concord Picante)
- Hans Mathisen: Timeless Tales (Curling Legs)
- Chick Corea with Stefano Bollani: Orvieto (ECM)
- Geri Allen: A Child Is Born (Motéma Music)
- Oliver Lake: For a Little Dancin' (Intakt Records)
- Nils Petter Molvær: Baboon Moon (Columbia)
- Jeff Beck: Rock 'n' Roll Party (Honoring Les Paul) (Friday Music)
- Chick Corea, Eddie Gomez, Paul Motian: Further Explorations (Concord Jazz)
- Béla Fleck and the Flecktones: Rocket Science (eOne)
- Splashgirl: Field Day Rituals (Hubro)
- Olga Konkova: Return Journey (Losen)

=== Deaths ===
- George Shearing (August 13, 1919 – February 14), British pianist
- Joe Morello (July 17, 1928 – March 12), American drummer
- Phoebe Snow (July 17, 1950 – April 26), American singer
- Cornell Dupree (December 19, 1942 – May 8), American guitarist
- Bob Flanigan ((August 22, 1926 – May 15), American singer
- Amy Winehouse ((September 14, 1983 – July 23), English singer
- Harald Johnsen (March 19, 1970 – July 24), Norwegian upright bassist
- Frank Foster (September 23, 1928 – July 26), American saxophonist
- Eddie Marshall (April 13, 1938 – September 7), American drummer
- Johnny Răducanu (December 1, 1931 – September 19), Romanian pianist
- Paul Motian (March 25, 1931 – November 22), American drummer
- Cesária Évora (August 27, 1941 – December 17), Cape Verdean singer

== 2012 ==
=== Album releases ===
- Chick Corea & Gary Burton: Hot House (Concord Jazz)
- Charlie Haden and Hank Jones: Come Sunday (EmArcy)
- Tord Gustavsen Quartet: The Well (ECM)
- Manu Katché: Manu Katché (ECM)
- Stian Omenås: Klangkammer 1 (NorCD)
- Pixel: Reminder (Cuneiform)
- Pat Metheny: Unity Band (Nonesuch)
- Acuña, Hoff, Mathisen: Barxeta (Losen)
- John McLaughlin and The 4th Dimension: Now Here This (Abstract Logix)
- Eivind Aarset: Dream Logic (ECM)
- Marc Johnson: Swept Away (ECM)
- Enrico Pieranunzi with Scott Colley and Antonio Sanchez: Permutation (CamJazz)
- Andrea Kvintett: Andrea Kvintett (NorCD)
- Mari Kvien Brunvoll: Mari Kvien Brunvoll (Jazzland)
- Winther - Storm: Spinnaker (NorCD)
- Håkon Storm-Mathisen: Zinober (NorCD)
- Geri Allen: Grand River Crossings (Motéma Music)
- Chick Corea: The Continents, Concerto For Jazz Quintet & Chamber Orchestra (Deutsche Grammophon)
- Béla Fleck and The Marcus Roberts Trio: Across the Imaginary Divide (Rounder)
- Pat Metheny: The Orchestrion Project (Nonesuch)
- Pixel: Reminder (Cuneiform Records)

=== Deaths ===
- Totti Bergh (December 5, 1935 – January 4), Norwegian saxophonist
- John Levy (April 11, 1912 – January 20), American upright-bassist
- Clare Fischer (October 22, 1928 – January 26), American keyboardist, composer, arranger, and bandleader
- Eivin One Pedersen (September 8, 1956 – February 22), Norwegian accordionist and pianist
- Lucio Dalla (March 4, 1943 – February 25), Italian singer, clarinetist and actor
- Lucio Dalla (March 4, 1943 – March 1), Italian singer, clarinetist and actor
- Frank Marocco (January 2, 1931 – March 3), American piano-accordionist, arranger and composer
- Pete Cosey (October 9, 1943 – May 30), American guitarist
- Von Freeman (October 3, 1923 – August 11), American saxophonist
- John Tchicai (April 28, 1936 – October 8), Danish saxophonist and composer
- Frode Thingnæs (March 20, 1940 – 15 November), Norwegian jazz trombonist and bandleader
- Dave Brubeck (December 6, 1920 – December 5), American jazz pianist and composer

== 2013 ==
=== Album releases ===
- Chick Corea with Christian McBride and Brian Blade: Trilogy (Concord)
- Ketil Bjørnstad: La Notte (ECM)
- John Scofield: Überjam Deux (EmArcy)
- Pat Metheny play music from John Zorn's Masada Book Two: Tap: Book of Angels Volume 20 (Nonesuch, Tzadik)
- Oliver Lake: Wheels (Passin' Thru)
- Motorpsycho and Reine Fiske: Still Life with Eggplant (Rune Grammofon)
- Renaud Garcia-Fons: Beyond The Double Bass (Enja)
- Atomic: There's A Hole In The Mountain (Losen)
- Pixel: We Are All Small Pixels (Cuneiform)
- Eliane Elias: I Thought About You (A Tribute To Chet Baker) (Concord Jazz)
- Enrico Pieranunzi with Marc Johnson and Paul Motian: Live At The Village Vanguard (CamJazz)
- Helge Sunde and Ensemble Denada: Windfall (Ocella)
- Oliver Lake: All Decks (Intakt Records)
- Chick Corea: The Vigil (Concord Jazz)

=== Deaths ===
- Claude Nobs (February 4, 1936 – January 10), Swiss founder and general manager of the Montreux Jazz Festival
- Donald Byrd (December 9, 1932 – February 4), American trumpeter
- Armando Trovajoli (September 2, 1917 – February 28), Italian film composer and pianist
- Alvin Lee (December 19, 1944 – March 6), English singer and guitarist
- Yngve Moe (October 4, 1957 – April 17), Norwegian bass guitarist
- Rolf Graf (April 28, 1960 – July 1), Norwegian bass guitarist
- Ed Shaughnessy (January 29, 1929 – May 24), American drummer
- Ben Tucker (December 13, 1930 - June 4), American upright-bassist
- George Duke (January 12, 1946 – August 5), American keyboardist and composer
- Jane Harvey (January 6, 1925 – August 15), American singer
- Donna Hightower (December 28, 1926 – August 19), American singer
- Marian McPartland (March 20, 1918 – August 20), English-American pianist
- Ronald Shannon Jackson (January 12, 1940 – October 19), American drummer
- Chico Hamilton (September 20, 1921 – November 25), American drummer
- Jim Hall (December 4, 1930 – December 10), American guitarist
- Stan Tracey (December 30, 1926 – December 6), British pianist and composer
- Yusef Lateef (October 9, 1920 – December 23), American saxophonist and composer

== 2014 ==
=== Album releases ===
- Pat Metheny Unity Group: Kin (←→) (Nonesuch)
- Tord Gustavsen Quartet: Extended Circle (ECM)
- Arve Henriksen: Chron (Rune Grammofon)
- Jan Gunnar Hoff: Fly North (Losen)
- Hildegunn Øiseth: Valencia (Losen)
- Guttenberger Brothers: #ONE (59music/H´Art)
- Bobby Hutcherson: Enjoy the View (Blue Note)
- Gisle Torvik and Hardanger Big Band: Kryssande (NorCD)
- Christer Fredriksen: Trademark (Losen)
- Tokame: Eres la tierra mas linda (59music/H´Art)
- Renaud Garcia-Fons with Derya Türkan: Silk Moon (e-motive)
- Ellen Andrea Wang: Diving (Propeller)
- Enrico Pieranunzi with Scott Colley and Antonio Sanchez: Stories (CamJazz)
- Hans Mathisen: The Island (Curling Legs)
- Nils Petter Molvær: Switch (Okeh)
- Manu Katché: Live in Concert (ACT)
- Stanley Clarke: Up (Mack Avenue)
- Chick Corea: Chick Corea Solo Piano - Portraits (Concord Jazz)
- Béla Fleck & Abigail Washburn: Béla Fleck & Abigail Washburn (Rounder)
- Lena Nymark: Beautiful Silence (Grappa Music)

=== Deaths ===
- Pete Seeger (May 3, 1919 – January 27), American guitarist
- Franny Beecher (September 29, 1921 – February 24), American guitarist
- Paco de Lucía (December 21, 1947 – February 25), Spanish virtuoso flamenco guitarist and composer
- Herb Jeffries (September 24, 1913 – May 25), American singer and actor
- Horace Silver (September 2, 1928 – June 18), American pianist
- Charlie Haden (August 6, 1937 – July 11), American upright-bassist
- Lionel Ferbos (July 17, 1911 – July 19), American trumpeter
- Gerald Wilson (September 4, 1918 – September 8), American trumpeter
- Joe Sample (February 1, 1939 – September 12), American pianist
- Kenny Wheeler (January 14, 1930 – September 18), Canadian composer, trumpeter, and flugelhorn player
- Olav Dale (October 30, 1958 – October 10), Norwegian saxophonist, composer and orchestra leader
- Tim Hauser (December 12, 1941 – October 16), American singer
- Jack Bruce (May 14, 1943 – October 25), Scottish bassist, composer and orchestra leader
- Buddy DeFranco (February 17, 1923 – December 24), American clarinetist

== 2015 ==
=== Album releases ===
- Marius Neset: Pinball (ACT)
- Terje Isungset: Meditation (All Ice)
- Andreas Loven: Nangijala (Losen)
- Mopti featuring Bendik Baksaas: Bits & Pieces (Jazzland)
- Øystein Blix: It´s OK To Play (Losen)
- Dag Arnesen: Grieg, Tveitt & I (Coco & Co)
- Olga Konkova Trio: The Goldilocks Zone (Losen)
- John Scofield: Past Present (Impulse!)
- David Arthur Skinner: Cubistic Boogie (Losen)
- Hildegunn Øiseth: Time Is Coming (Losen)
- Eliane Elias: Made in Brazil (Concord Jazz)
- Enrico Pieranunzi with Federico Casagrande: Double Circle (CamJazz)
- Per Mathisen Trio: Ospitalita Generosa (Alessa Records)
- Oliver Lake: To Roy (Intakt Records)
- Jeff Beck: Live+ (Rhino Entertainment Company)
- Chick Corea with Béla Fleck: Two (Concord Jazz)

=== Deaths ===
- Clark Terry (December 14, 1920 – February 21), American trumpeter
- Erik Amundsen (February 1, 1937 – February 22), Norwegian upright-bassist
- Jørgen Ingmann (April 26, 1925 – March 21), Danish guitarist
- B.B. King (September 16, 1925 – May 14), American guitarist
- Bob Belden (October 31, 1956 – May 20), American saxophonist
- Marcus Belgrave (June 12, 1936 – May 23), American trumpeter
- Slim Richey (February 11, 1938 – May 31), American guitarist
- Ornette Coleman (March 9, 1930 – June 11), American saxophonist
- Monica Lewis (May 5, 1922 – June 12), American singer and actress
- Gunther Schuller (November 22, 1925 – June 21), American composer, conductor, and horn player
- Phil Woods (November 2, 1931 – September 29), American saxophonist, clarinetist, bandleader and composer
- Larry Rosen (May 25, 1940 – October 9), American drummer, entrepreneur, and music producer
- Mark Murphy (March 14, 1932 – October 22), American singer
- Nora Brockstedt (January 20, 1923 – November 5), Norwegian singer
- Svein Christiansen (August 6, 1941 – November 25), Norwegian drummer
- Natalie Cole (February 6, 1950 – December 31), American singer, songwriter, and actress

== 2016 ==
=== Album releases ===
- Tord Gustavsen, Simin Tander, Jarle Vespestad: What Was Said (ECM)
- Ayumi Tanaka Trio: Memento (AMP)
- Knut Kristiansen and Bergen Big Band: Kuria Suite (Grappa)
- Andreas Loven: District Six (Losen)
- Jon Balke: Warp (ECM)
- Hanna Paulsberg Concept: Eastern Smiles (ODIN)
- Frode Alnæs: Kanestrøm (Øra Fonogram)
- Ben Monder, Pete Rende, Andrew Cyrille, Paul Motian: Amorphae (ECM)
- Ralph Alessi, Gary Versace, Drew Gress, Nasheet Waits: Quiver (ECM)
- Myrna: Story Of I (Tomtom & Braza)
- Per Oddvar Johansen: Let’s Dance (Edition)
- COKKO (Marte Eberson, Natalie Sandtorv, Ole Mofjell): The Dance Upon My Grave (Playdate Records)
- Mast (musician): "Love and War_" (Alpha Pup Records)
- Josef Leimberg: "Astral Progressions" (Alpha Pup Records)

=== Deaths ===
- Paul Bley (November 10, 1932 – January 3), Canadian pianist
- Harald Devold (May 13, 1964 – February 19), Norwegian saxophonist
- Naná Vasconcelos (August 2, 1944 – March 9), Brazilian percussionist
- Keith Emerson (November 2, 1944 – March 10), English pianist and keyboardist
- Gato Barbieri (November 28, 1932 – April 2), Argentine saxophonist
- Bill Henderson (March 19, 1926 – April 3), American singer and actor
- Don Francks (February 28, 1932 – April 3), Canadian singer and actor
- Dennis Davis (August 28, 1951 – April 6), American drummer
- Prince (June 7, 1958 – April 21), American music producer, composer and multi-instrumentalist.
- Kay Starr (July 21, 1922 - November 3), American vocalist.
- Alphonse Mouzon (November 21, 1948 – December 26), American drummer.
