= 2013 in jazz =

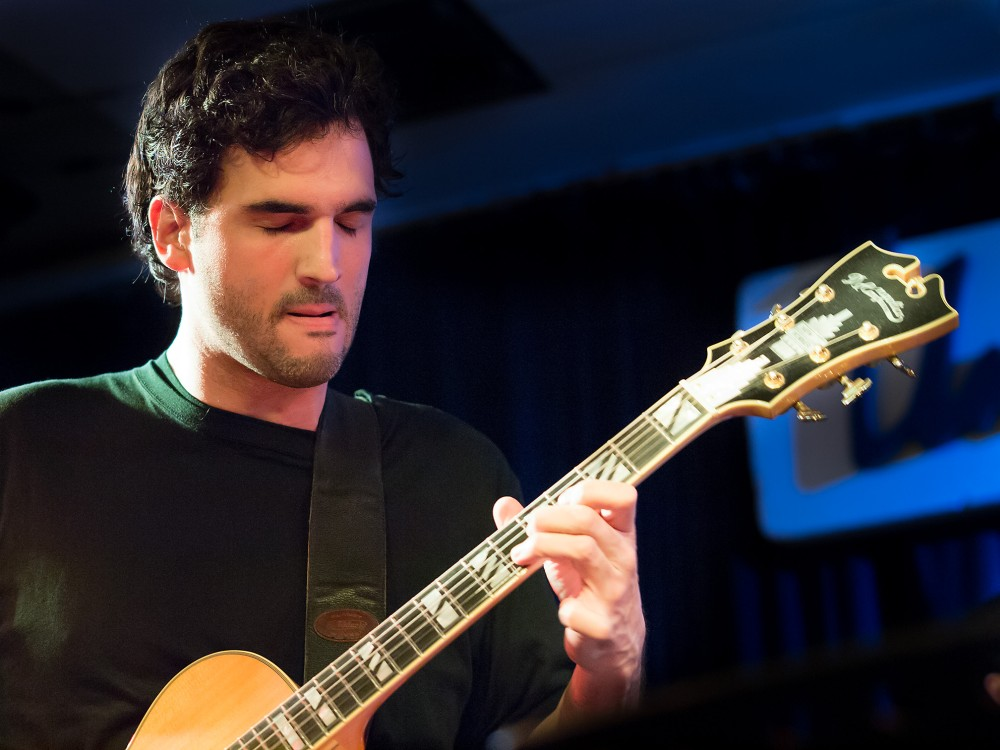
- Scott DuBois at Unterfahrt 2013.
- Decade: 2010s in jazz
- Music: 2013 in music
- Standards: List of jazz standards
- See also: 2012 in jazz – 2014 in jazz

This is a timeline documenting events of Jazz in the year 2013.

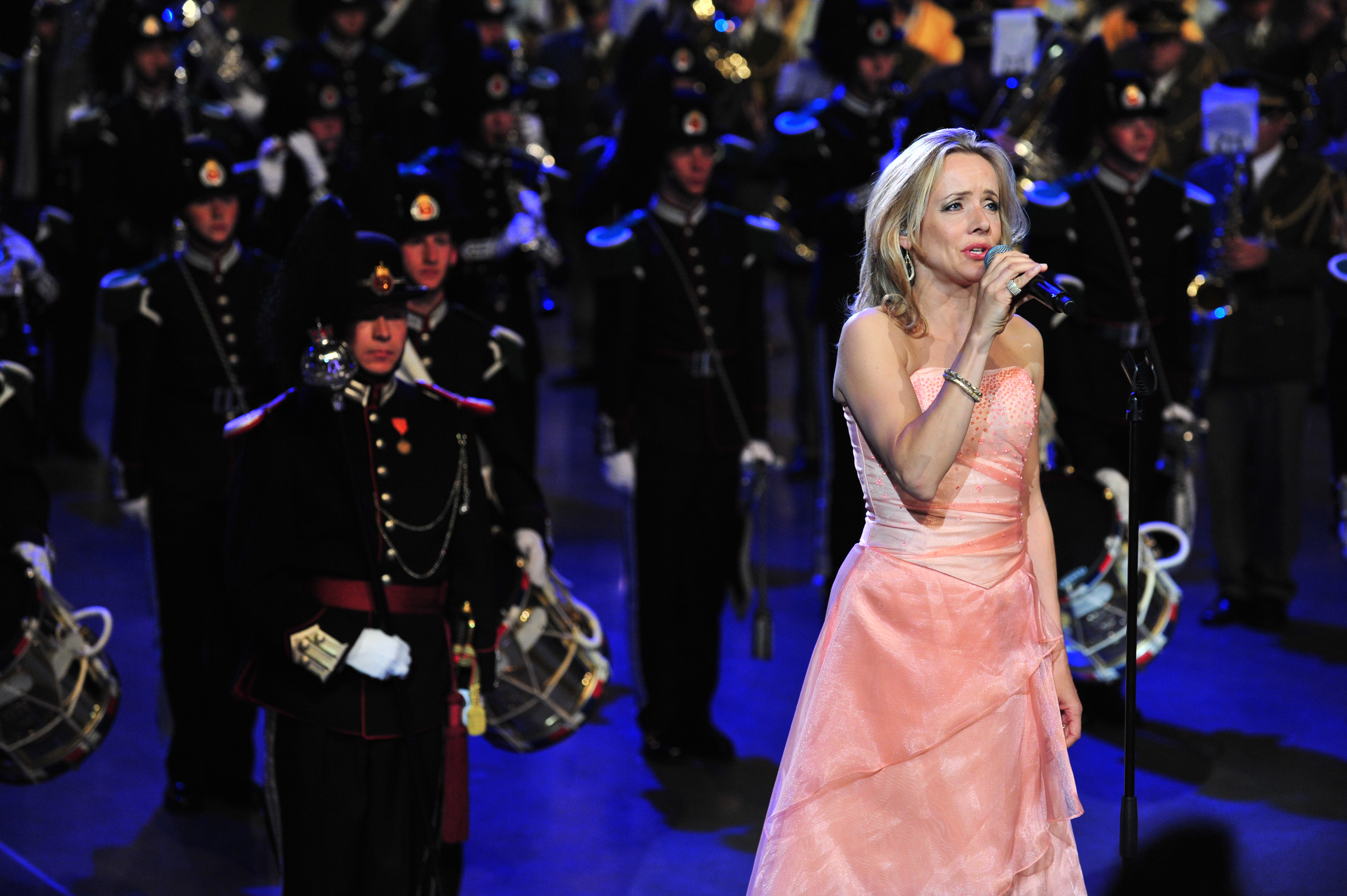
Jannike Kruse, live 2013.

== Events ==
=== January ===
- 23 – The 2nd Bodø Jazz Open started in Bodø, Norway (January 23 – 27).
- 24 – The 8th Ice Music Festival started in Geilo, Norway (January 24 – 27).
- 31 – The 15th Polarjazz Festival 2013 started in Longyearbyen, Svalbard (January 31 – February 7).

=== March ===
- 1 – The 9th Jakarta International Java Jazz Festival started in Jakarta, Indonesia (March 1 – 3).
- 22 – The 40th Vossajazz started in Voss, Norway (March 22 – 24).
- 23
  - Tore Brunborg was awarded Vossajazzprisen 2013 as well as the Buddyprisen 2012 at Vossajazz.
  - Stian Carstensen performed the commissioned work Flipp for Vossajazz 2013.

=== April ===
- 24 – The 19th SoddJazz 2013 started in Inderøy, Norway (April 24 – 28).
- 26 – The 2nd Torino Jazz Festival started in Turin (April 26 – May 1).
- 30 – The International Jazz Day.

=== May ===
- 17 – The 42nd Moers Festival started in Moers, Germany (May 17 – 20).
- 23 – The 41st Nattjazz started in Bergen, Norway (May 23 – June 1)

=== June ===
- 17 – The 25th Jazz Fest Wien started in Vienna, Austria (June 17 – July 10).
- 28 – The 33rd Montreal International Jazz Festival started in Montreal, Quebec, Canada (June 28 – July 7).

=== July ===
- 3 – The 49th Kongsberg Jazzfestival started at Kongsberg, Norway (July 3 – 6).
- 5 – The 47th Montreux Jazz Festival started in Montreux, Switzerland (July 5 – July 20).
- 8 – The 66th Nice Jazz Festival started in Nice, France (July 8 – 12).
- 12
  - The 38th North Sea Jazz Festival started in The Hague, Netherlands (July 12 – 14).
  - The 35th Copenhagen Jazz Festival started in Copenhagen, Denmark (July 12 – 14).
  - The 48th Pori Jazz Festival started in Pori, Finland (July 12 – 21).
- 15 – The 53rd Moldejazz started in Molde, Norway with Jason Moran as artist in residence (July 15 – 20).

=== August ===
- 3 – The 57th Newport Jazz Festival started in Newport, Rhode Island (August 3 – 5).
- 7 – The 27th Sildajazz started in Haugesund, Norway (August 7 – 11).
- 9 – The 29th Brecon Jazz Festival started in Brecon, Wales (August 9 – 11).
- 12 – The 28th Oslo Jazzfestival started in Oslo, Norway (August 12 – 17).
- 13 – Erlend Skomsvoll was recipient of the Ella-prisen 2013 at the Oslo Jazzfestival.

=== September ===
- 6 – The 9th Punktfestivalen started in Kristiansand, Norway (September 6 – 8).
- 19 – The 56th Monterey Jazz Festival started in Monterey, California (September 19 – 21).

=== October ===
- 14 – The 30th Stockholm Jazz Festival started in Stockholm, Sweden (October 14 – 20).
- 24 – Eliane Elias, Marc Johnson and Mauricio Zottarelli live at USF Verftet, Bergen, Norway.

=== November ===
- 15 – The 22nd London Jazz Festival started in London, England (November 15 – 24).

=== December ===
- Sons of Kemet wins Best Jazz Act in the 2013 MOBO Awards.

== Albums ==
Month	Day	Album	Artist	Label	Notes	Ref.
April	4	There's A Hole In The Mountain	Atomic	Losen Records		
April	12	La Notte	Ketil Bjørnstad	ECM Records	Produced by Manfred Eicher	
April	12	Still Life with Eggplant	Motorpsycho and Reine Fiske	Rune Grammofon	Produced by Bent Sæther	
April	12	Map Of The World – Music For Guitar	Gjermund Titlestad	Ponca Jazz Records		
April	26	Guided Tour	The New Gary Burton Quartet	Mack Avenue	Produced by Gary Burton	
April	30	Brooklyn Babylon	Darcy James Argue's Secret Society		features Ingrid Jensen	
May	24	Somewhere	Keith Jarrett Standards Trio with Gary Peacock and Jack DeJohnette	ECM Records		
May	31	The Sleep Of Reason	Arne Jansen	ACT Music	Produced by Arne Jansen, Axel Reinemer	
June	3	Seven Hills	Alexi Tuomarila Trio	Edition	Produced by Alexi Tuomarila	
June	14	Melodic Warrior	Terje Rypdal with The Hilliard Ensemble	ECM	Produced by Manfred Eicher	
June	25	OWL Trio	Lage Lund, Orlando le Fleming, Will Vinson	Losen		
July	2	Überjam Deux	John Scofield	EmArcy Records		
August	5	Sun Pictures	Linda May Han Oh	Greenleaf Music		
August	6	The Vigil	Chick Corea	Concord Records		
August	6	Out Here	Christian McBride	Mack Avenue Records		
August	27	The Orchestrion Project	Pat Metheny	Nonesuch Records		
September	2	Prism	Dave Holland	Dare2	with Eric Harland, Kevin Eubanks, and Craig Taborn	
September	9	Burn	Sons of Kemet	Naim Records		
October	1	Places of Worship	Arve Henriksen	Rune Grammofon		
October	8	We Are All Small Pixels	Pixel	Cuneiform Records		
October	18	NyeSongar.no	Karl Seglem	NorCD		
October	25	New Circle	Geir Lysne	ACT Music		
November	13	Beyond The Double Bass	Renaud Garcia-Fons	Enja Records		
November	29	Dagane	Daniel Herskedal	NorCD		

== Deaths ==
January

- 10 – Claude Nobs, Swiss founder and general manager of the Montreux Jazz Festival (born 1936).
- 28 – Brian Brown, Australian musician and educator (born 1933).
- 29 – Butch Morris, American cornetist, composer, and conductor (born 1947).

February

- 1 – Rudolf Dašek, Czech guitarist (born 1933).
- 4
  - Donald Byrd, American trumpeter (born 1932).
  - Pat Halcox, English trumpeter (born 1930).
- 23 – Sonny Russo, American trombonist (born 1929).
- 25 – Stewart "Dirk" Fischer, American composer, trumpeter, and valve trombonist (born 1924).
- 28 – Armando Trovajoli, Italian film composer and pianist (born 1917).

March

- 5 – Melvin Rhyne, American organist (born 1936).
- 6 – Alvin Lee, English singer and guitarist (born 1944).
- 7 – Kenny Ball, English trumpeter, bandleader, and vocalist (born 1930).
- 15 – Terry Lightfoot, British clarinettist and bandleader (born 1935).
- 22 – Bebo Valdés, Cuban pianist, bandleader, composer, and arranger (born 1918).
- 29 – Enzo Jannacci, Italian singer-songwriter, pianist, actor, and stand-up comedian (born 1935).
- 30 – Phil Ramone, South African-born American recording engineer, record producer, violinist and composer (born 1934).

April

- 2 – Linda Vogt, Australian flautist (born 1922).
- 5 – Terry Devon, British singer (born 1922).
- 6 – Don Shirley, American-Jamaican pianist and composer (born 1927).
- 11 – Don Blackman, American jazz-funk pianist, singer, and songwriter (born 1953).
- 17 – Yngve Moe, Norwegian bass guitarist (fell in coma, after drowning in Tenerife, Spain), Dance with a Stranger (born 1957).
- 18 – Tom Parker, British pianist (born 1944).

May

- 24 – Ed Shaughnessy, American drummer (born 1929).

June

- 4 – Ben Tucker, American upright-bassist (murder) (born 1930).
- 8 – Mulgrew Miller, American pianist, composer, and educator (born 1955).
- 11 – Johnny Smith, American cool jazz and mainstream jazz guitarist (born 1922).
- 13 – Sam Most, American jazz flautist, clarinetist and tenor saxophonist (born 1930).
- 26 – Henrik Otto Donner, Finnish composer and trumpeter (born 1939).
- 29 – Paul Smith, American jazz pianist (born 1922).

July

- 1 – Rolf Graf, Norwegian bass guitarist in the band Lava (cancer) (born 1960).
- 2 – Bengt Hallberg, Swedish pianist, composer, and arranger (born 1932).
- 18 – Carline Ray, American singer, pianist, and guitarist, International Sweethearts of Rhythm (born 1925).
- 25 – Steve Berrios, American drummer and percussionist (born 1945).
- 28 – Rita Reys, Duch singer (died 1924).

August

- 5 – George Duke, American keyboardist and composer (born 1946).
- 15 – Jane Harvey, American singer (born 1925).
- 18 – Rolv Wesenlund, Norwegian comedian, singer, clarinetist, and saxophonist (died 1936).
- 19
  - Cedar Walton, American pianist (died 1934).
  - Donna Hightower, American singer (born 1926).
- 20
  - Marian McPartland, English-American pianist (born 1918).
  - Sathima Bea Benjamin, South African vocalist and composer (born 1936).

September

- 7 - Lee Tanner, American Jazz photographer, 82
- 16 – Jimmy Ponder, American guitarist (born 1946).
- 17 – Bernie McGann, Australian alto saxophonist (born 1937).
- 18 – Lindsay Cooper, English bassoon and oboe player, composer, and political activist (born 1951).
- 23
  - Gia Maione, American singer (born 1941).
  - Paul Kuhn, German pianist, singer, and band leader (born 1928).

October

- 5 – Butch Warren, American upright bassist (born 1939).
- 13 – Tommy Whittle, British saxophonist (born 1926).
- 15
  - Donald Bailey, American drummer (born 1933).
  - Gloria Lynne, American singer (born 1929).
- 19 – Ronald Shannon Jackson, American drummer (born 1940).
- 30 – Frank Wess, American saxophonist and flautist (born 1922).

November

- 9 – Kalaparusha Maurice McIntyre, American tenor saxophonist (born 1936).
- 25 – Chico Hamilton, American drummer (born 1921).

December

- 6 – Stan Tracey, British pianist and composer (born 1926).
- 10 – Jim Hall, American guitarist (born 1930).
- 19 – Herb Geller, American saxophonist, composer, and arranger (born 1928).
- 21 – Trigger Alpert, American bassist (born 1916).
- 23 – Yusef Lateef, American saxophonist and composer (born 1920).
- 25 – Kaj Backlund, Finnish trumpeter, composer, arranger, and bandleader (born 1945).
- 28 – Dwayne Burno, American upright bassist (born 1970).
- 29 – Red Balaban, American tubist and sousaphonist (born 1929).
- 31 – Al Porcino, American trumpeter (born 1925).

== See also ==
- List of 2013 albums
- List of years in jazz
- 2010s in jazz
- 2013 in music
