= We Are All Small Pixels =

Studio album by Pixel
- Released: October 7, 2013
- Recorded: April 8–12, 2013
- Studio: Propeller Music Division, Oslo, Norway
- Genre: Jazz; pop/rock
- Length: 46:49
- Label: Cuneiform

Pixel chronology
Reminder (2012)	We Are All Small Pixels (2013)	Golden Years (2015)

Professional ratings
Review scores
Source	Rating
All About Jazz	4.5/5 stars
The Absolute Sound	4/5 stars

We Are All Small Pixels is the second studio album by Norwegian jazz band Pixel. True to the band's style, it mixes challenging jazz compositions and horn arrangements with approachable and "hummamble" choruses.

== Track listing ==
No.	Title	Music	Length
1.	"Be Mine"	Ellen Andrea Wang	5:21
2.	"Space"	Ellen Andrea Wang	3:52
3.	"Farris"	Ellen Andrea Wang	4:10
4.	"Edge"	Ellen Andrea Wang	5:20
5.	"Night Dreamer"	Ellen Andrea Wang	7:51
6.	"Easter Song"	Harald Lassen	1:15
7.	"Passport"	Jonas Kilmork Vemøy	5:01
8.	"Dreaming"	Harald Lassen	3:35
9.	"Sigma"	Jon Audun Baar	3:35
10.	"Daylight"	Ellen Andrea Wang	2:56
11.	"Time"	Ellen Andrea Wang	3:53
Total length:			46:49

== Personnel ==
- Ellen Andrea Wang – Composer, Double Bass, Vocals
- Jon Audun Baar – Composer, Drums, Percussion
- Harald Lassen – Composer, Sax (Soprano), Sax (Tenor)
- Jonas Kilmork Vemøy – Composer, Trumpet
- Jacob Dobewall – Assistant Engineer
- Mike Hartung – Engineer, Mixing Engineer
- Morgan Nicolaysen – Mastering
- Solveig Selj – Band Photo, Cover Photo
