= Jonas Kilmork Vemøy =

Norwegian jazz trumpeter and composer (born 1986)

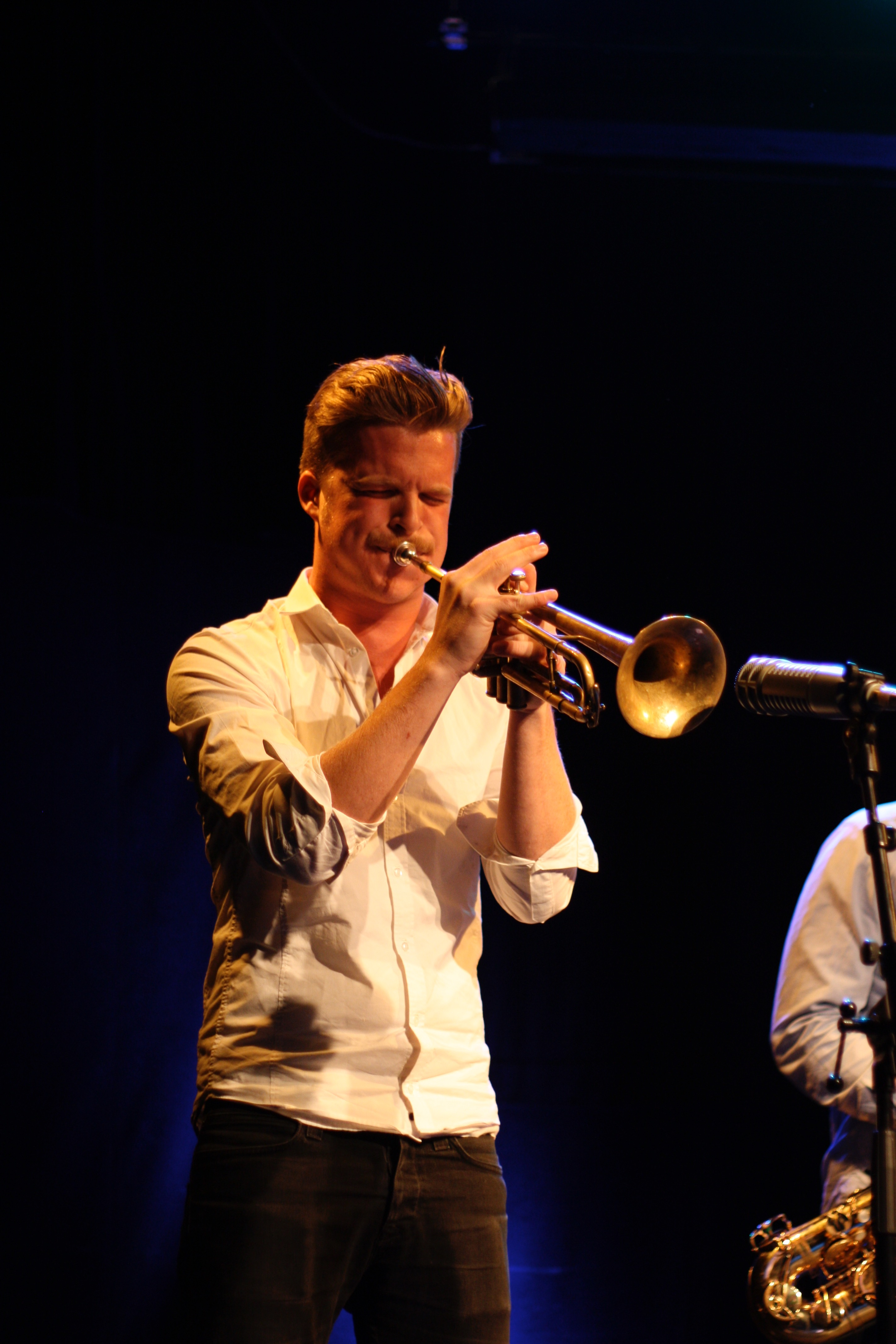
- Vemøy at Victoria, National Jazz Scene in Oslo 2010.

Background information
- Born: 12 October 1986 (age 39); Oslo, Vestfold
- Origin: Norway
- Genres: Jazz
- Occupations: Musician and composer
- Instrument: Trumpet
- Label: Cuneiform
- Member of: Maridalen

Jonas Kilmork Vemøy (born 12 October 1986 in Oslo, Norway) is a Norwegian Jazz musician (trumpet) and composer, member of Maridalen jazz trio, and also known from collaborations within a series of bands and album releases. He was raised in Larvik in the county of Vestfold.

== Career ==
Vemøy was educated at Norwegian Academy of Music (2007–2011) in Oslo, where he studied under teachers Torgrim Sollid and Eckhard Baur. Residing in Oslo he started working as a trumpet teacher educator at the Academy of Music autumn 2011, beside the collaboration within the bands "Blokk 5", Lama, Kristin Minde Band, Pixel, "Simra", "Filter" and Lise Hvoslef Band among other projects. The gig by "Pixel", including the front figure double bassist and vocalist Ellen Andrea Wang, saxophonist Harald Lassen and drummer Jon Audun Baar, was noted as "one of the most memorable moments" of the Match and Fuse Festival, by the Jazz magazine Down Beat.

== Honors ==
- 2013: Featured at Young Nordic Jazz Comets within Pixel

== Discography ==
Within Maridalen

- 2021: Maridalen (Jazzland Recordings)

Within "Blokk 5»

- 2007: Scandals and Animals (dBut Records)
- 2011: Sing your hart out! (Kennel Records)

Within Lama

- 2009: Guidebook To Lamaland (Spoon Train Audio)
- 2009: Look What You Made Us Do (Spoon Train Audio)
- 2011: Endless Repeats (Spoon Train Audio)

Within Pixel

- 2012: Reminder (Cuneiform Records)
- 2013: We are all small pixels (Cuneiform Records)
- 2015: Golden Years (Cuneiform Records)

Within Kristin Minde Band

- 2011: Six Feet Over (VME)
- 2013: The Weight (VME)

With other projects

- 2009: If You Don't Have Time To Cook, You Don't Have Time To Live (LP Records), with "Lasse Passage»
- 2009: Leave Your Friends And Family (Musikkoperatørene), with "The Captain & Me»
- 2009: På Lag (MUDI), with "Team Båt»
- 2010: Maneten Medusa (Schmell), with Åshild Watne
- 2011: Walk in the Light (MUDI), with Jens Andreas Kleieven
- 2011: Fridas Fabelaktige Ferie (Musikk-Husets Forlag), with Tone Ophus
- 2011: Hope is happiness (LS Music), with Hilde Dahl
- 2012: The Rise and Fall (Sony Music), with "Casa Murilo"
- 2014: Mapping the Coincidence (Lise Hvoslef Records), with Lise Hvoslef
- 2014: Kråkesølv (Jansen Plateproduksjon), with Kråkesølv
