= Reminder (album) =

Studio album by Pixel
- Released: May 8, 2012
- Genre: Jazz
- Length: 42:58
- Label: Cuneiform Records
- Producer: Jørgen Munkeby

Pixel chronology
Reminder (2012)	We Are All Small Pixels (2013)

Reminder is a studio album by the Norwegian band Pixel, released by Cuneiform Records on May 8, 2012 (RUNE 342).

== Critical reception ==
Professional ratings
Review scores
Source	Rating
Dagbladet	4/6 stars
Oppland Arbeiderblad	5/6 stars

The band Pixel and the album Reminder is the exam project of bass player and vocalist Ellen Andrea Wang at Norwegian Academy of Music. All About Jazz critique Bruce Lindsay, in his review of Pixel's album Reminder states:

... Wang and her fellow band members were all in their mid-20s when they recorded Reminder in May, 2011, their youthful exuberance tempered by technical ability and a keen awareness of their musical antecedents...

The reviewer Terje Mosnes of the Norwegian newspaper Dagbladet awarded the album dice 4, and the reviewer Frode Hermanrud of the Norwegian newspaper Oppland Arbeiderblad} awarded the album dice 5.

== Track listing ==
All compositions by Ellen Andrea Wang

1. "Prelude" (2:26)
2. "Home" (3:03)
3. "Esset" (4:51)
4. "Call Me" (3:26)
5. "She Knows" (4:35)
6. "Wake Up" (3:48)
7. "Waltz 1" (3:40)
8. "Hvor Ble den Av?" (8:38)
9. "I Hang" (4:21)
10. "An Apple in the Country Hill" (4:17)

== Personnel ==
- Ellen Andrea Wang – Double bass and vocals
- Jon Audun Baar – Drums & percussions
- Harald Lassen – Tenor & soprano saxophone and backing vocals
- Jonas Kilmork Vemøy – Trumpet and backing vocals
