= Ellen Andrea Wang =

Norwegian jazz musician and composer (born 1986)

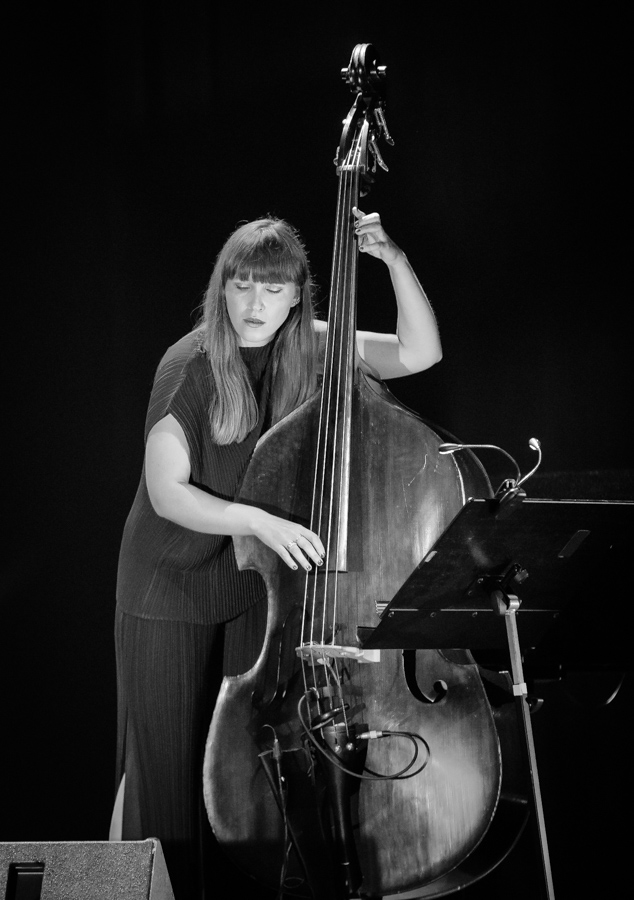
- (2017)

Background information
- Born: 10 October 1986 (age 39); Gjøvik, Oppland, Norway
- Genres: Jazz
- Occupations: Singer, musician
- Instruments: Vocals, double bass, electric bass
- Member of: Pixel
- Website: www.ellenandreawang.com

Ellen Andrea Wang (born 10 October 1986 in Gjøvik, Norway) is a Norwegian jazz musician (double bass and singer) and composer. She is the cousin of singer-songwriter Marthe Wang. Raised in Søndre Land Municipality in Oppland, she released her debut album, Diving, in 2014. She formed the band Pixel in 2010. Wang has toured with Manu Katché and Marilyn Mazur and has performed with Sting. Since the summer of 2019, she has been touring with her Closeness project, a trio with London-based guitarist Rob Luft & Swedish drummer Jon Fält. They are signed to Brooklyn-based label Ropeadope Records and have performed at jazz festivals across Europe.

== Career ==
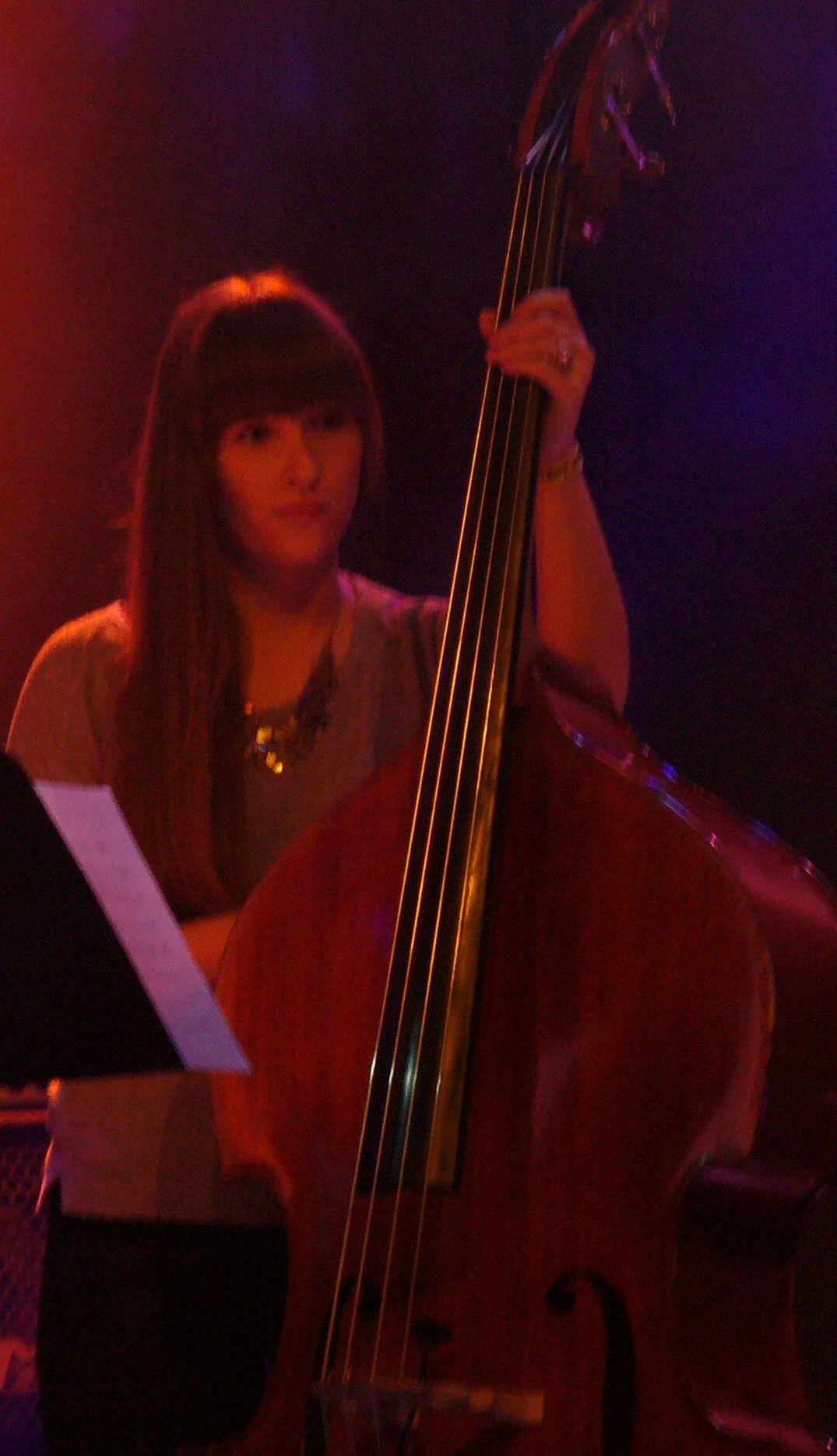
Wang at Vossajazz 2014.

Wang started playing the violin at a young age, but substituted an upright bass for the violin at the age of sixteen, and attended the Norwegian Academy of Music under guidance of the bassist Bjørn Kjellemyr. She is leading her own Ellen Andrea Wang Trio and the band "Pixel", is a driving force in the band "SynKoke", and is in addition part of the band Dag Arnesen Trio (2010 -). The gig by "Pixel" including drummer Jon Audun Baar, trumpeter Jonas Kilmork Vemøy and saxophonist Harald Lassen, was noted as "one of the most memorable moments" of the Match and Fuse Festival, by the Jazz magazine Down Beat.

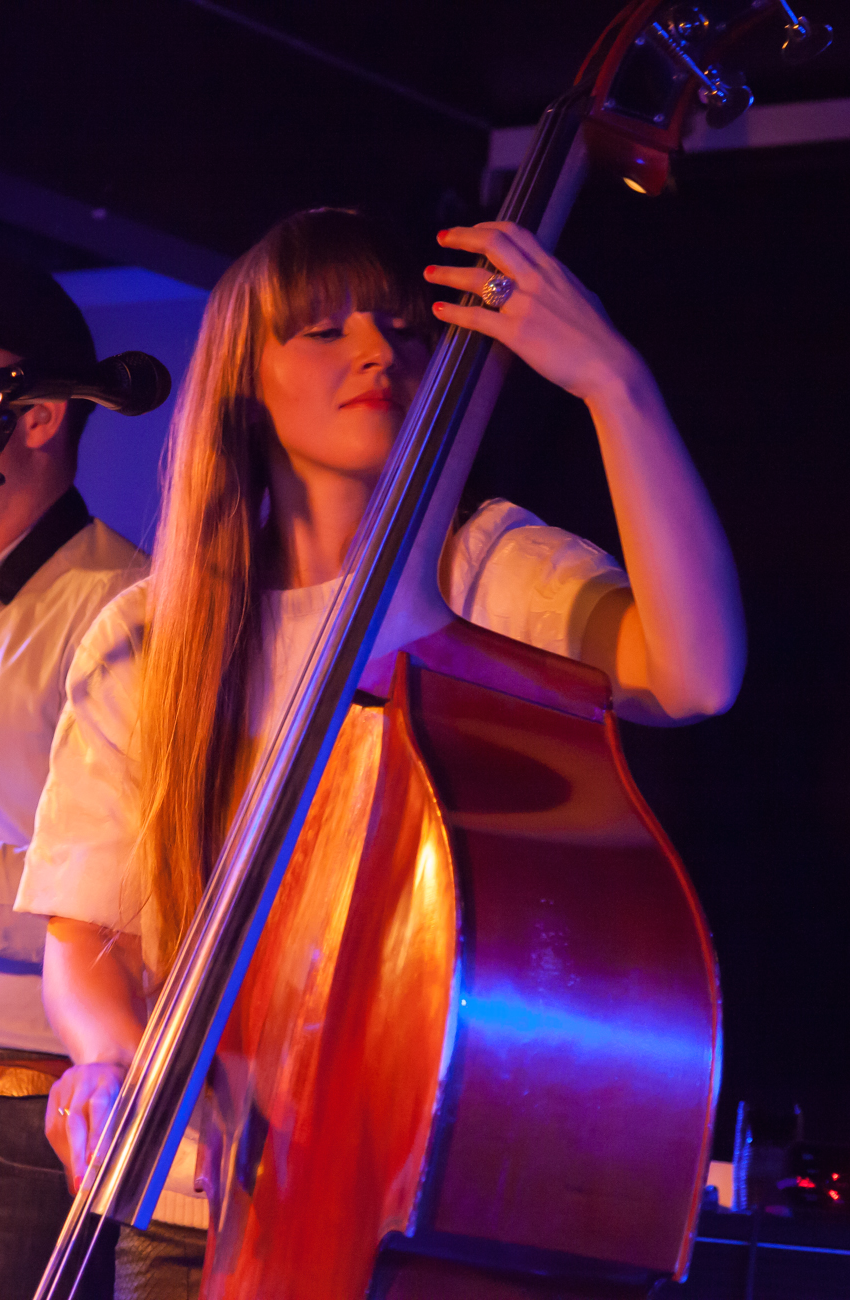
Ellen Andrea Wang 2013. (Photo by Tore Pettersen)

At Oslo Jazz Festival 2013, Wang for the first time presented a band that bears her name Ellen Andrea Wang Trio. On the keyboards is Andreas Ulvo, well known from the "Eple Trio" and Mathias Eick's band. On the drums is Erland Dahlen, who collaborates with Nils Petter Molvær and Susanna Wallumrød among others. The trio play an innovative jazz with elements from the rock and pop world.

At Vossajazz 2014, she appeared within Ivar Kolve's Polyostinat experience. Here she performed with Norwegian musicians.

At Moldejazz 2014, Wang presented material from her debut solo album Diving. The Ellen Andrea Wang Trio play a mix of jazz, pop and rock.

In October 2014 the bands "Pixel" and "SynKoke" delivered gigs at the London venue Vortex Jazz Club during the 'Match and Fuse Festival'.

Wang received the Kongsberg Jazz Festivals great musician prize in July 2015. The prize is awarded to a musician who has a leading position on the Norwegian jazz scene.

In 2018 she released the album Run, Boy, Run with the vocal trio Gurls including Hanna Paulsberg and Rohey Taalah on the Grappa label.

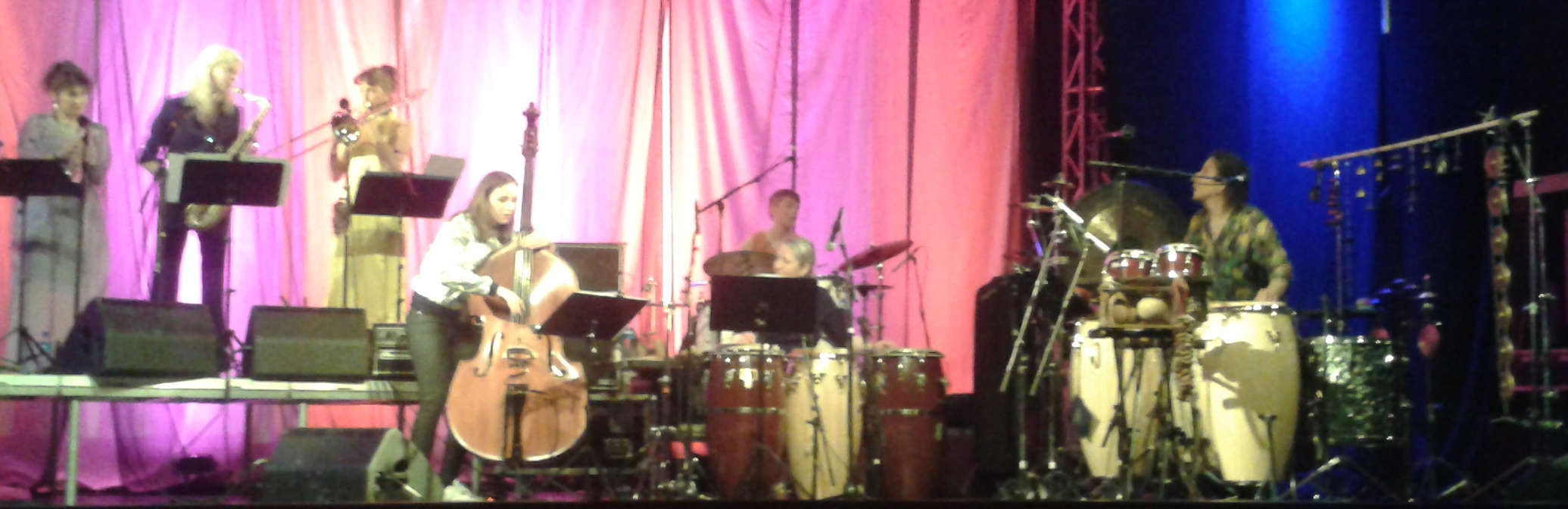
Wang with Marilyn Mazur's Shamania at Vossajazz 2016.

In mid-2019, she began a new trio project with British guitarist Rob Luft and Swedish jazz percussionist Jon Fält. The band began as a tribute to the music of American double bassist Charlie Haden, acquiring the name Closeness, which is in itself an homage to Haden’s 1976 release ’Closeness Duets’. However, after touring across Scandinavia, the U.K. & Central Europe the trio increasingly began playing Wang’s original compositions. Their debut album was released on Ropeadope Records in the autumn of 2020 & a second release is expected from in the autumn of 2024.

== Honors ==
- 2011: "This year's Talent Award" at "DølaJazz»
- 2012: "Statkraft Young Star" at "Oslo Jazzfestival"
- 2012: "New Star of The Month" by the "Japan Magazine"
- 2013: Featured at Young Nordic Jazz Comets within Pixel
- 2015: The Kongsberg Jazz Award (DnB Award) at Kongsberg Jazzfestival

== Discography ==
=== Solo albums ===
Ellen Andrea Wang Trio

- 2014: Diving (Propeller)
- 2017: Blank Out (Jazzland)
- 2019: Closeness (Ropeadope Records, 2019 - with Rob Luft & Jon Fält)
- 2020: There is a place - single (Ropeadope Records 2020)

With SynKoke

- 2009: Hokjønn (AIMSoundCity)
- 2011: The Ideologist (Kokeplate)

With Pixel

- 2012: Reminder (Cuneiform)
- 2013: We Are All Small Pixels (Cuneiform)
- 2015: Golden Years (Cuneiform)

With Gurls

- 2018: Run Boy, Run (Grappa)

=== Collaborations ===
With Pastor Wang Quintet

- 2007: Blå Hymne (Wango Productions)

With The Opium Cartel

- 2009: Night Blooms (Termo)

With Dag Arnesen Trio

- 2010: Norwegian Song 3 (Losen)

With Amherst

- 2010: A Light Exists in Spring (NorCD)

With White Willow

- 2011: Terminal Twilight (Termo)
- 2017: Future Hopes (The Laser's Edge)

With Lena Nymark

- 2014: Beautiful Silence (Grappa)

== See also ==
- List of jazz bassists

Awards
Preceded by Mathias Eick	Recipient of the Kongsberg Jazz Award; 2015	Succeeded by Susanna Wallumrød
