= Tap: Book of Angels Volume 20 =

Tap: Book of Angels Volume 20 Pat Metheny plays Masada Book 2

Studio album by Pat Metheny
- Released: May 20, 2013
- Recorded: 2013
- Studio: MSR Studios, New York City
- Genre: Avant-garde, jazz, contemporary classical
- Length: 50:41
- Label: Tzadik; Nonesuch TZ 8307
- Producer: Pat Metheny

Pat Metheny chronology
The Orchestrion Project (2013)	Tap: Book of Angels Volume 20; Pat Metheny plays Masada Book 2 (2013)	Kin (2014)

Book of Angels chronology
Abraxas: Book of Angels Volume 19 (2012)	Tap: Book of Angels Volume 20 (2013)	Alastor: Book of Angels Volume 21 (2014)

Nonesuch Cover

Tap: Book of Angels Volume 20 is an album by guitarist Pat Metheny performing compositions from John Zorn's Masada Book Two. The album was released simultaneously on Tzadik Records and Nonesuch Records. Though Zorn and Metheny are of similar age and both came to prominence in the late 1970s and have long admired each other's music, Tap is the first collaboration between the artists.

== Track listing ==
All music is composed by John Zorn, arranged by Pat Metheny.

No.	Title	Length
1.	"Mastema"	7:20
2.	"Albim"	9:07
3.	"Tharsis"	5:54
4.	"Sariel"	11:09
5.	"Phanuel"	10:55
6.	"Hurmiz"	6:12
Total length:		50:41

== Personnel ==
- Pat Metheny – acoustic and electric guitars, baritone guitar, sitar guitar, tiples; bass; piano; orchestrionic marimba, orchestra bells, bandoneon, percussion; electronics; flugelhorn
- Antonio Sánchez – drums
- Maya Jasmine Willow Metheny – guest vocalist (track 6)

== Technical ==
- Pat Metheny – producer, recording, liner notes
- Pete Karam – mixing
- Ted Jensen – mastering at Sterling Sound, NYC, USA
- John Zorn, Robert Hurwitz (Nonesuch) – executive producers, liner notes
- Kazunori Sugiyama – associate producer
- Barbara de Wilde – design (based on a design by Heung-Heung Chin)

== Reception ==
Professional ratings
Review scores
Source	Rating
AllMusic	4/5 stars
The Guardian	4/5 stars
The Independent	4/5 stars
Free Jazz Collective	3.5/5 stars
The List	2/5 stars
In Your Speakers	6/10 stars

The album received generally favorable reviews with AllMusic's Thom Jurek observing "Tap: John Zorn's Book of Angels, Vol. 20 is a special album in both men's catalogs. (It's being released simultaneously on both Nonesuch and Tzadik.) These compositions offer Metheny something that he's seldom been able to take advantage of. While he's regularly performed the works of other composers, he has seldom had the opportunity to so thoroughly orchestrate and arrange them. Ironically, this collaboration has resulted in giving him the freedom to explore his artistic expression as an individual, at a deeper level".

Writing for The Guardian, John Fordham noted "Metheny manages to be true both to Zorn and himself – reflecting the former's respect for traditional Jewish folk music while splintering it with free-improv assaults, but sustaining that creative tension in his own warmer and less abrasive ways. The melodies are wonderful, and variations often inspired". In The Montreal Gazette, Juan Rodriguez stated "Metheny does a lot of overlapping and overdubbing, but there's a Middle Eastern tinge that's common to a lot of Zorn's recent compositions, as well as lilting Metheny-isms that make Tap a bright, glowing outing, almost a primer on how complexity evolves from utter simplicity. Alternating between long journeys and shorter interludes, each tune reveals a beautifully constructed unity while going off in all directions. This is a fascinating meeting of minds". The Independent's Andy Gill said "It's all dazzlingly virtuosic and evocative".

Many online reviewers were also complimentary. On All About Jazz, Nenad Georgievski said, "Metheny has placed his imprint on Zorn's music in an idiosyncratic way. Full of aggressive, dirty and equally tender vibes and melodies, with immersive textures that give each composition a different kind of depth and character". Des Crowley from Addicted to Noise commented that " Tap is a brilliant reminder, should we need it, of the unfettered openness Zorn and Metheny bring to their individual and collaborative projects. Hopefully, it will be find a wide audience, and encourage first-time listeners to seek out other recordings in Zorn's on-going Book of Angels series" The Arts Desk's Peter Quinn exclaimed "it's surprising that it's taken quite so long for fellow trailblazers Pat Metheny and John Zorn to work together. It's certainly been worth the wait, as this collection is a real barn-burner".

Elsewhere the critics were less enthusiastic. Troy Dostert was more reserved in his praise stating, "It's not a classic, and it probably won't end up ranking with Metheny's best work. But on the whole, his sincerity and respect for Zorn's music do come through convincingly, and at the very least this should do enough to keep everyone wondering what Metheny might try to tackle next". The List called it "An album which encompasses several facets of Metheny's musical personality but fails to impress" and stated "When Metheny eschews the synth pads and naff guitar effects for a jazzier acoustic approach, Zorn's affecting Sephardic melodies shine through. While there are digressions into tricksy post-bop and abstract sonics, Metheny's glossy makeover is weak sauce next to Zorn's other group, Masada". In Your Speakers correspondent Robbie Ritacco complained that "Tap plays out as more of an educational affair than a direct contribution to any particular facet of the music scene. It's a project of niche interest... the album has little to offer in terms of sustainability or accessibility".
