= Lena Nymark =

Norwegian jazz musician and teacher

- Born: 6 November 1980 (age 45); Ålesund, Møre og Romsdal
- Origin: Norway
- Genres: Jazz
- Occupations: Musician and composer
- Instruments: Vocals, saxophone, clarinet, flute, electronics
- Label: Grappa Music
- Website: www.lenanymark.no

Lena Nymark (born 6 November 1980 in Ålesund, Norway) is a Norwegian jazz singer and music teacher raised on the island Sula, south of Ålesund. She was educated at the Norwegian Academy of Music. In addition to vocals, she plays saxophone, clarinet, flute and electronics.

== Career ==
Nymark's debut solo album Beautiful Silence was released in 2014. In it she played alongside Norwegian jazz musicians Andreas Ulvo on piano, Ellen Andrea Wang on upright bass and Martin Langlie on drums. Previously Nymark participated in the electro-acoustic trio DinoSau. She also has collaborated with musicians like Terje Isungset, Hanne Hukkelberg, Robert Post, Silucian Town, Florebius, Sula Art Ensemble, Trondheim Jazz Orchestra and had several projects with Rikskonsertene.

== Discography ==
=== Solo albums ===
- 2014: Beautiful Silence (Grappa Music)

=== Collaborations ===
With Florebius

- 2005: House of Flour (Jazzaway Records)

With DinoSau

- 2007: A Little Crime (Propeller Recordings)

With Silucian Town

- 2007: Saga of I-land (AIM Music)

With Terje Isungset

- 2008: Ice Concerts (All Ice Records)
- 2010: Winter Songs (All Ice Records)

With other projects

- 2004: Little Things (Propeller Recordings)
- 2005: Cast Anchor (Leaf Records)
- 2006: To Sing You Apple Trees (Trust Me)
- 2006: Rykestrasse 68 (Propeller Recordings)
- 2006: Do Not As I Do (Leaf Records)
- 2007: Ocean Sessions (Bobfloat Sessions)
- 2007: A Cheater's Armoury (Nettwerk UK)
- 2008: O' Horten: Music From The Motionpicture (KAAARec)
- 2008: Shockadelica: 50th Anniversary Tribute To The Artist Known As Prince (C+C Records, 2008), on selected tunes
- 2009: Disarm And Let Go Out Now (Bobfloat)
- 2009: Blood From A Stone (Propeller Recordings)

EP's

- 2003: Cast Anchor EP (Propeller Recordings)
