= Mohamed Issa Haji 'Matona' =

Zanzibarian musician

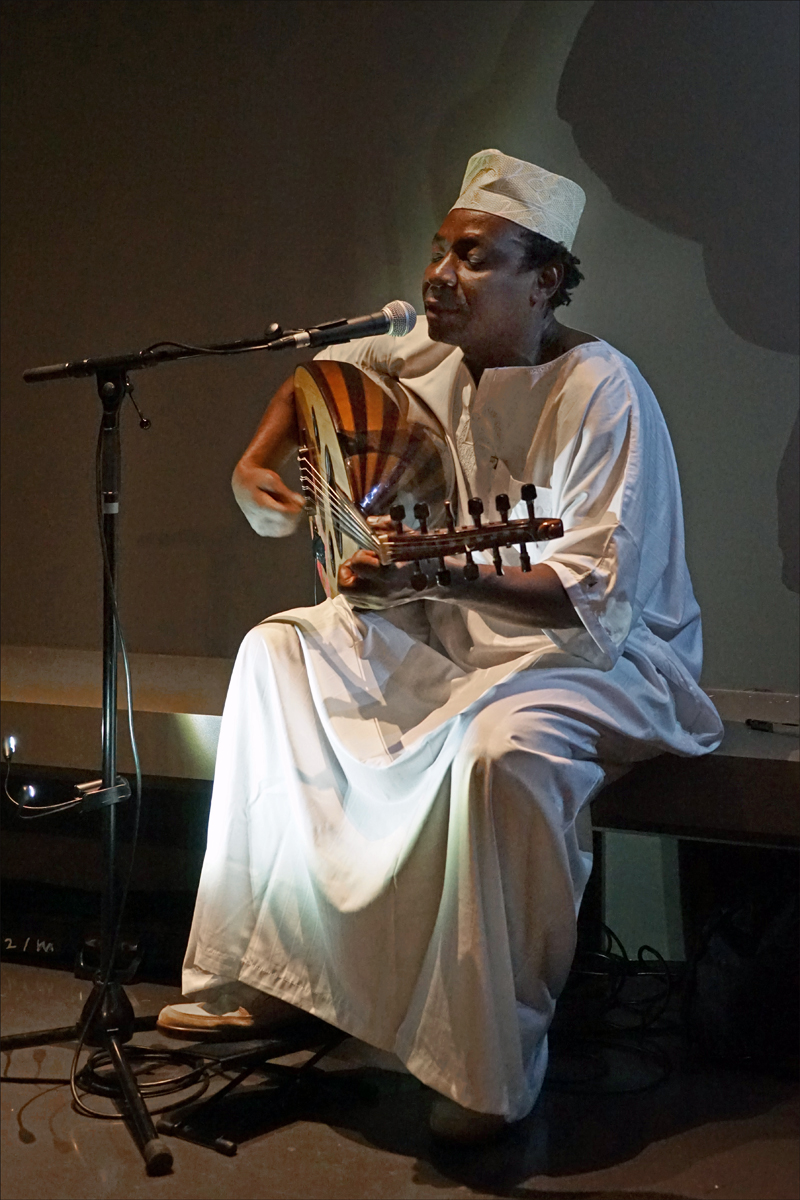
Mohamed Issa Matona in performance at the Institut du monde arabe (Paris), 2016.

Mohamed Issa Haji 'Matona (born 1969) is a Zanzibarian musician. He is a founder and the artistic director of Zanzibar's Dhow Countries Music Academy.

== Early life ==
Mohamed is the son of the renowned Tanzanian musician Issa Matona (a composer, singer, and violinist in the taarab genre).

== Career ==
Issa Matona played in the orchestra JKT Taarab, based in Dar es Salaam. Mohamed was born in Zanzibar and educated in mainland Tanzania. As a child, Mohamed Issa Matona learned to play violin by watching his father, and percussion by playing on disused milk cans. In 1987, at the age of 18, he joined his father's band. He went on to play with Twinkling Stars (led by Mohammed Ilyas). In 1995, he started his own taarab band, G-Clef. In 2001, in association with Joseph Castico, Zanzibar's one-time director of the ministry of Information, Culture and Sports, Mohamed founded the Dhow Countries Music Academy, working initially as treasurer before becoming director. In 2010 Mohamed took a diploma in music at the DCMA with a thesis on 'The Development of Taarab Music in Zanzibar'.

== Discography ==
This discography is incomplete.

- Msumeno. Dar es Salaam. (no date)
- The Norwegian Radio Orchestra with Maryam Said Hamdun, Mohammed Issa Matona Haji & Rajab Suleiman, Symphonic Taraab (Jaro 2014)
- Matona's Afdhal Group (OK World, 2018)
