= Kristin Minde =

Norwegian vocalist and composer (born 1982)

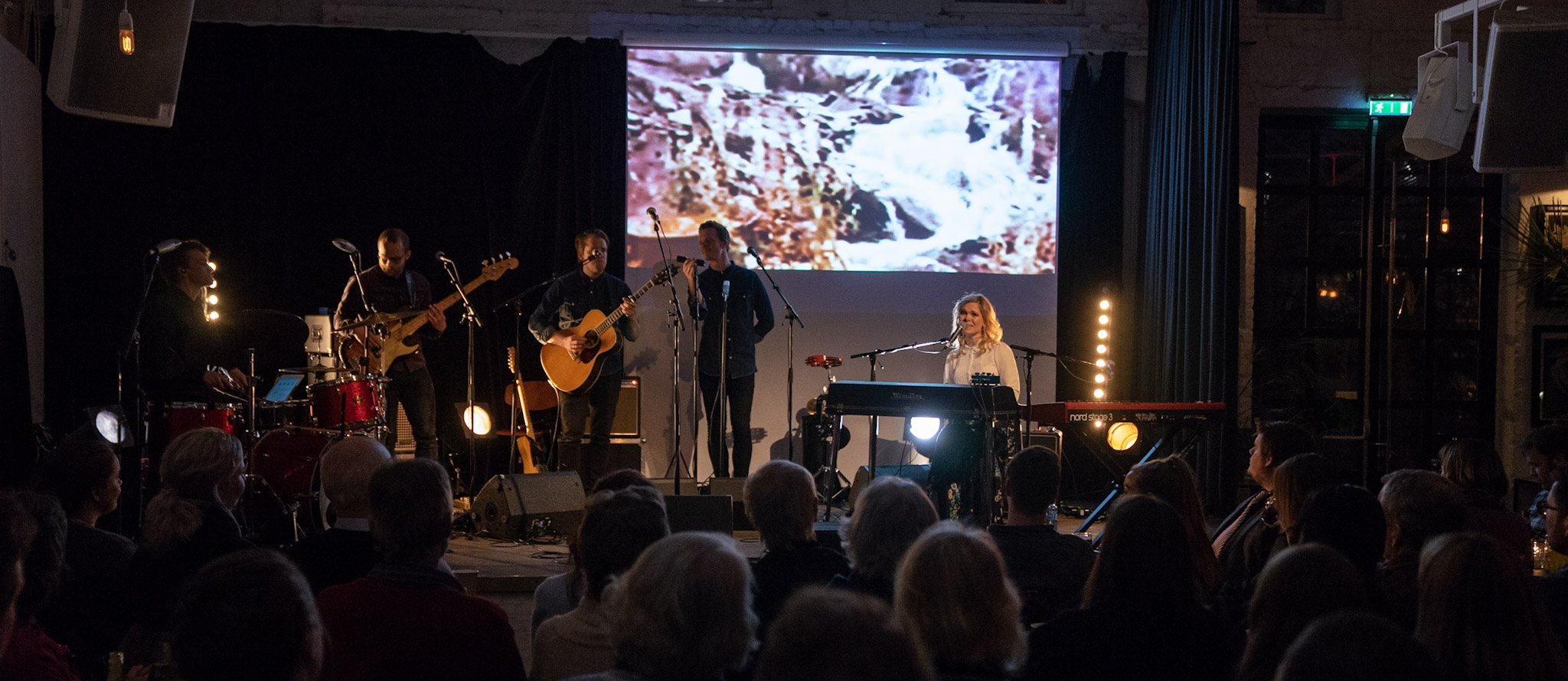
- Minde performing in 2018

Background information
- Born: 27 July 1982 (age 44); Oslo, Norway
- Origin: Frekhaug, Norway
- Genres: Pop
- Occupations: Musician, composer
- Instruments: Vocals, piano
- Label: GRAMMOFON AS
- Website: www.kristinminde.com

Kristin Minde (born 27 July 1982) is a Norwegian pop singer and musician.

== Early life ==
Minde was born in Oslo, Norway, and raised in Frekhaug north of Bergen. She began playing the piano at home in Frekhaug when she was five years old.

== Career ==
Minde was a member of the vocal group "Nardus" performing in the NRK program "Absolutt norsk" (Absolutely Norwegian) in 2002 and 2003, with Rune Larsen as a program host, and the six girls appeared as soloists and choir. Nardus released in the disc Uncovered in 2002.

After having released her debut solo album Six Feet Over (2011), the music was defined as "melodic, maximalist musical pop". This seems like an apt description also for her second album, The Weight (2013). It is largely magnificent and somewhat bombastic pop music, which Minde communicates with strong empathy and good tune flair.

In 2018, she released her first album in Norwegian, Hjerteslag.

== Discography ==
=== Solo albums ===
- 2011: Six Feet Over (Voices of Wonder)
- 2013: The Weight (Voices of Wonder)
- 2018: Hjerteslag (Grammofon AS)
- 2019: Vinterrosen (Grammofon AS)
- 2021: Alle slags dager del 1 (Grammofon AS)
- 2022: Alle slags dager del 2 (Grammofon AS)

=== Collaborations ===
- 2002: Uncovered, Nardus (Plush Badgers records)
