= Torino Jazz Festival =

Music festival in Turin, Italy

- Status: Active
- Genre: Jazz Festival
- Date: April - May
- Frequency: Annually
- Location: Turin
- Country: Italy
- Years active: 2012 - present
- Inaugurated: Founded 2012
- Most recent: 30 April 2024
- Website: www.torinojazzfestival.it

The Torino Jazz Festival is an annual jazz festival held in the city of Turin that was founded in 2012.

The Torino Jazz Festival was created to enhance the jazz tradition in Torino, and it quickly became an important point of reference in the European music scene. It is held every year at the end of April to coincide with UNESCO's International Jazz Day.

During the event, besides the solo and jam sessions, there are also meetings, sound performances in public and private areas, and "Jazz Blitz[es]" in atypical places like prisons, hospitals and hospice. More than 20 town clubs participate, where jazz will be played all year round by 250 musicians. During the festival, Turin turns into an open-air jazz venue, where some of the best jazz musicians in the world perform, invading the historic center and all the streets, squares, bars and clubs of the city.
