= Andreas Loven =

- Born: 28 October 1981 (age 43); Tromsø, Norway
- Genres: Jazz
- Occupation(s): Musician, composer
- Instrument: Piano
- Website: www.andreasloven.com

Andreas Loven (born 28 October 1981 in Tromsø, Norway) is a Norwegian jazz pianist.

== Career ==
Loven was raised in Oslo, where he was taught classical piano by his grandmother from the age of six. 23 years old, and briefly after finishing his engineering studies, he witnessed Tord Gustavsen Trio live at Canal Street. The experience led Loven to quit his job and venture into jazz studies. He initially contacted Gustavsen via the yellow pages, and succeeded in receiving some piano lessons. Later, Loven moved to South Africa to study jazz at the South African College of Music under professor Andrew Liley.

Since 2011 he has made several public performances in South Africa and Europe, including recent concerts at the Oslo Jazz Festival, Canal Street Jazz Festival and the Norwegian National Jazz Scene.

In January 2015, Andreas released his debut album, Nangijala (Losen records), to critical acclaim. The album consisted of both duos and trios with South African sax-legend and close friend, Buddy Wells and Spha Mdlalose on vocals.

In February 2016 Andreas Loven released his second album, District Six, recorded with his South African quartet, including South African sidemen Buddy Wells (sax), Clement Benny (drums) and Romy Brauteseth (bass). The album, rooted in both South African jazz traditions and Nordic folk, received notable attention worldwide after its release, receiving positive reviews from Gwen Ansell in South Africa, Peter Bacon in UK, Adam Baruch in Israel, Jan Granlie in Norway and others.

== Discography ==
- 2015: Nangijala (Losen Records)
- 2016: District Six (Losen Records)
