= The Orchestrion Project =

Live album by Pat Metheny
- Released: February 11, 2013
- Recorded: November 2-4, 2010
- Venues: St. Elias Church, Greenpoint, Brooklyn, New York
- Genre: Jazz
- Length: 106:40
- Label: Nonesuch
- Producer: Pat Metheny

Pat Metheny chronology
Unity Band (2012)	The Orchestrion Project (2013)	Tap: Book of Angels Volume 20 (2013)

The Orchestrion Project is an album by American guitarist Pat Metheny released as a double CD in early 2013 on the Nonesuch label following the release of a concert video with the same name in 2012. The album was recorded on tour following Orchestrion, Metheny's album from 2010 which used orchestrionic instruments.

== Reception ==
Professional ratings
Review scores
Source	Rating
AllMusic	4/5 stars
The Observer	4/5 stars
Tom Hull	B

The album received generally favorable reviews, with Metacritic giving it a score of 83% from 5 reviews. AllMusic awarded the album 4 stars, and in its review Thom Jurek said, "While this album's predecessor evidenced his accomplishment in the instrument's creation and operation, The Orchestrion Project reveals that Metheny's possibilities with it have only been tapped". Dave Gelly of The Observer said, "I have never heard anything quite like it". BBC Music's Peter Marsh was less impressed stating "The Orchestrion is impressive when seen in action. But Metheny's use of it here delivers a pale, expensive shadow of what a real band can achieve. The project doesn't feel like it has longevity, and this release is for the hardcore only".

== Track listing ==
All tracks are written by Pat Metheny except where noted.

Disc one:
No.	Title	Writer(s)	Length
1.	"Improvisation #1"		4:51
2.	"Antonia"		6:14
3.	"Entry Point"		10:27
4.	"Expansion"		8:43
5.	"Improvisation #2"		10:07
6.	"80–81/Broadway Blues"	Pat Metheny, Ornette Coleman	4:23
7.	"Orchestrion"		15:59

Disc two:
No.	Title	Length
1.	"Soul Search"	9:54
2.	"Spirit of the Air"	8:38
3.	"Stranger in Town"	5:39
4.	"Sueño con Mexico"	8:53
5.	"Tell Her You Saw Me"	5:17
6.	"Unity Village"	7:35

Video:
No.	Title	Writer(s)	Length
1.	"Unity Village"		7:35
2.	"Orchestrion"		15:29
3.	"Entry Point"		10:27
4.	"Expansion"		8:43
5.	"Soul Search"		9:54
6.	"Spirit of the Air"		8:38
7.	"Sueño con Mexico"		8:53
8.	"Improvisation #2"		10:07
9.	"Stranger in Town"		5:39
10.	"Improvisation #1"		4:51
11.	"80-81/Broadway Blues"	Pat Metheny, Ornette Coleman	4:23
12.	"Tell Her You Saw Me"		5:17
13.	"Antonia"		6:14

== Personnel ==
- Pat Metheny – acoustic and electric guitars, guitar synthesizer, orchestrionics
