= Scott DuBois =

American jazz guitarist and composer

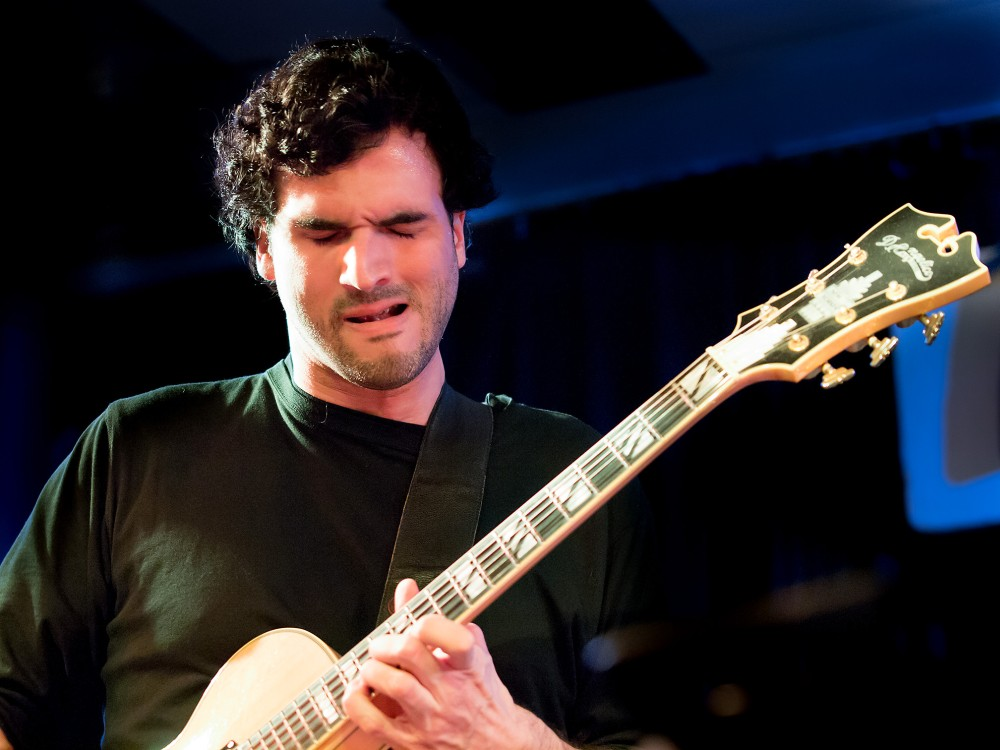
- DuBois at Jazz Club Unterfahrt, Munich 2013

Background information
- Born: April 27, 1978 (age 48); United States
- Genres: Jazz; post-bop; jazz fusion
- Occupation: Musician
- Instrument: Guitar
- Labels: ACT; Sunnyside; Soul Note
- Website: www.scottdubois.com

Scott DuBois (born April 27, 1978) is an American jazz guitarist and composer.

== Career ==
DuBois studied at the Manhattan School of Music. He recorded two albums featuring saxophonist David Liebman, Monsoon (2004) and Tempest (2006), for the Soul Note record label, three albums, Banshees (2008), Black Hawk Dance (2010) and Landscape Scripture (2012), for Sunnyside Records, and two albums, Winter Light (2015) and Autumn Wind (2017), for the ACT record label. Landscape Scripture was named one of the "Top 10 Jazz Albums of 2012" by National Public Radio. Winter Light was named one of the "Albums of the Year" (2015) by the New York City Jazz Record.

His current quartet consists of Gebhard Ullmann on tenor saxophone and bass clarinet, Thomas Morgan on bass, and Kresten Osgood on drums.

The New York Times described Scott DuBois as having "an equal commitment to knotty compositions and blank-canvas improvisation".

DuBois was named in DownBeat Magazine's 2019 Critics' Poll in the "Rising Star Guitar" Category.

== Awards and honors ==
- 2018 ECHO Award for Autumn Wind album.
- 2005 Thelonious Monk International Jazz Guitar Competition Semi-Finalist.

== Discography ==
- Monsoon (Soul Note, 2004)
- Tempest (Soul Note, 2006)
- Banshees (Sunnyside, 2008)
- Black Hawk Dance (Sunnyside, 2010)
- Landscape Scripture (Sunnyside, 2012)
- Winter Light (ACT, 2015)
- Autumn Wind (ACT, 2017)
