= Bendik Baksaas =

Norwegian jazz and electronica musician

- Born: 28 November 1991 (age 34); Oslo
- Origin: Norway
- Genres: Electronica, jazz
- Occupations: Musician, composer, sound engineering, music producer
- Instrument: DJ
- Formerly of: Bendik Baksaas Band
- Website: bendikbaksaas.com

Bendik Baksaas (born 28 November 1991) is a jazz and electronica musician who has got some attention in the recent past, including through performances at places like Turkish Delight, Brukbar and Rockefeller.

== Career ==
Baksaas was born in Oslo. He has played with the electronica comet Mathias Stubø from Vestfold, and his Proviant Audio. In 2012 he released his debut album with Bendik Baksaas Band with David Aleksander Sjølie and Jonas Barsten Johnsen, an EP on the Trondheim-based record label Dayladore Collective. Unlike the band's little ambitious name, the debut album of the band got the eloquently name The Shape Of Beats To Come (2012), undoubtedly inspired by the chord progression free and simultaneous improvised album The Shape Of Jazz To Come (1959), by free jazz saxophonist Ornette Coleman. The similarity of Coleman genre defining release however stops there. The material that is presented on the five track and just over twenty minutes long release, fits nicely into the aesthetics that have been funded by Mathias Stubø and Proviant Audio In the recent past (2015), but is probably also inspired by sample delighted hiphop magicians J Dilla, and smooth jazz guitarists such as George Benson.

== Discography ==
- 2012: The Shape Of Beats To Come (Dayladore Collective)
- 2013: 1991 (Aspén Records)
- 2016: Mopti & Bendik Baksaas - Bits & Pieces (Jazzland Recordings)
- 2018: Seine Sviv (Jazzland Recordings)
- 2018: Kristoffer Eikrem & Bendik Baksaas: Duets (Mutual Intentions)
- 2018: Jenny (Dugnad Rec)
- 2019: Bendik Baksaas, Fredrik Høyer: Til Alt Ute: Måne & Sol (Dugnad Rec)
