= Harald Lassen =

Norwegian jazz musician

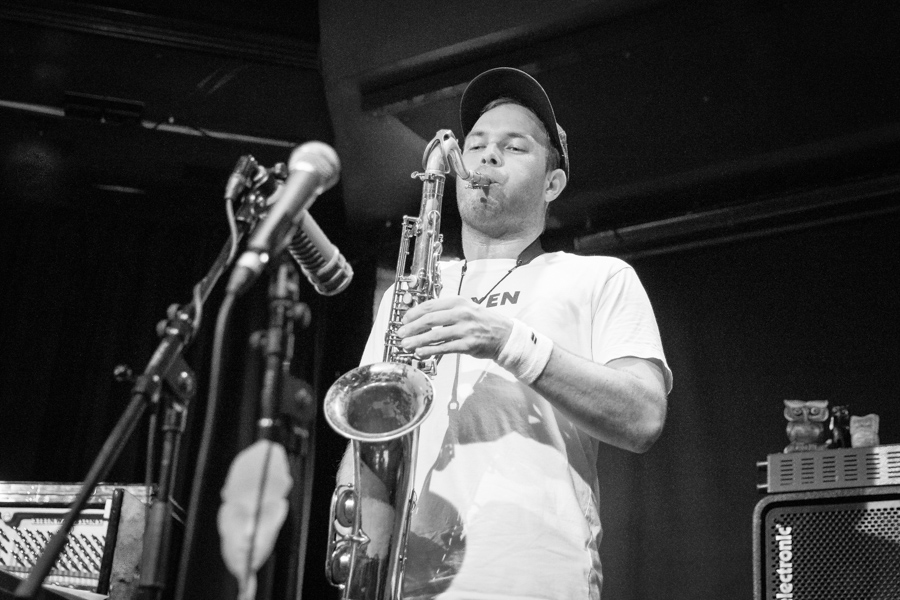
- Harald Lassen at Oslo Jazzfestival 2017

Background information
- Born: Harald Hagen Lassen; 13 March 1987 (age 39); Kristiansand, Vest-Agder
- Origin: Norway
- Genres: Jazz
- Occupations: Musician, composer
- Instruments: Saxophone, piano, percussions, vocals
- Labels: Jazzland Recordings; Cuneiform Records; NorCD; Havtorn Records
- Website: haraldlassen.com

Harald Lassen (born March 13, 1987, in Kristiansand, Norway) is a Norwegian jazz musician, songwriter, and bandleader. In addition to being the front man of LASSEN, he has played with several other bands, including DUPLEX, Mopti (with Bendik Baksaas on the album Bits & Pieces), Pixel, and No. 4. Early on, he was drawn to the attention of musicians like drummer Jon Christensen and bassist Arild Andersen.

== Career ==
Harald Lassen grew up in the southern part of Songdalen Municipality in Vest-Agder county, Norway. He studied to become a saxophonist after spending many years as a pianist. Lassen studied from 2006 to 2007 at Toneheim Folkehøgskole and from 2007 to 2008 at the Institutt for Rytmisk Musikk at Universitetet i Agder. From 2008 to 2012, he undertook additional training at the Norwegian Academy of Music in jazz and improvised music.

Lassen has collaborated with African musicians and dancers from Kenya, Tanzania, Ethiopia, Mozambique, and Uganda. He later relocated to Zanzibar in 2013 for a three-month stay in order to teach and start a jazz program at Dhow Countries Music Academy for young musicians.

Lassen has also worked with the following people: Rob Waring, Mathias Eick, Ray Phiri, Mohamed Issa Matona, LABtrio, Corrie Dick, Arthur Kay, Tord Gustavsen, Morten Qvenild, Emilie Stoesen Christensen, Anja Lauvdal, and Bram De Looze.

Lassen joined the Oslo Jazzfestival's board in 2015.

== Honors ==
- 2012: "This year's young jazz musicians", the Jazzintro award at Moldejazz, within Mopti
- 2013: Featured at Young Nordic Jazz Comets within Pixel

== Discography ==
- 2009: Team Båt - På Lag (Mudi)
- 2010: Martin Rane Bauck - Suite For A Distant Present Time (Bauckstadt)
- 2012: Andrea Kvintett - Andrea Kvintett (NorCD)
- 2012: Bendik Baksaas - The Shape of Beats To Come (Dayladore Collective), feat. on «Nobody Will Laugh»
- 2012: Ronja - Il Calebrone (Havtorn Records)
- 2012: Pixel - Reminder (Cuneiform Records)
- 2013: Dr Kay And His Interstellar Tone Scientists - Dr. Kay and the search for true happiness (Brass&Bangle)
- 2013: Andrea Kvintett - Russian Dream (NorCD)
- 2013: Duplex - Sketches Of … (NorCD)
- 2013: Duplex - Duolia (NorCD)
- 2013: Pixel - We Are All Small Pixels (Cuneiform Records)
- 2013: Mopti - Logic (Jazzland Recordings)
- 2014: Sjøen - Live 1 (Havtorn Records)
- 2015: Duplex - Èn (NorCD)
- 2015: Mopti - Bits & Pieces (Jazzland Recordings), feat. Bendik Baksaas
- 2015: Pixel - Golden Years (Cuneiform Records)
- 2016: No. 4 - Henda i været (Arch Rec)
- 2017: No. 4 - Hva Nå (Arch Rec)
- 2018: Matonas Afdhal Group - Matonas Afdhal Group (OK World)
- 2019: No. 4 - Duell (Samkjørt)
- 2016: Harald Lassen & Lab Trio - Rainbow Session (Hagen Recordings)
- 2018: LASSEN - Eventyrer (Jazzland Recordings)
- 2019: LASSEN feat. various artists - Remix-Eventyr (Jazzland Recordings)
- 2020: Human Samling
- 2023: Balans
