= Jon Audun Baar =

Norwegian jazz drummer

- Born: 1986 (age 39–40); Tomter, Østfold
- Origin: Norway
- Genres: Jazz
- Occupations: Musician, composer
- Instrument: Drums
- Label: Cuneiform Records
- Member of: Pixel
- Formerly of: Axel Jensen Lucky Three
- Website: pixelband.no

Jon Audun Baar (born 1986, Tomter, Hobøl, Norway) is a Norwegian Jazz drummer.

== Career ==
Baar studied jazz drumming at the Norwegian Academy of Music with teachers like Jon Christensen and Rune Martinsen. He has played on several jazzfestivals in Norway such as Moldejazz, Oslo Jazzfestival and Dølajazz with many different bands and artist. He plays within the critically acclaimed trio Eberson/Baar/Eberson with the international jazz guitar legend Jon Eberson and his daughter the keyboardist Marte Maaland Eberson.

Baar is the drummer of various bands including Axel Jensen Lucky Three and Pixel.

== Honors ==
- 2013: Featured at Young Nordic Jazz Comets within Pixel

== Discography ==
Within Pixel

- 2012: Reminder (Cuneiform)
- 2013: We Are All Small Pixels (Cuneiform)
- 2015: Golden Years (Cuneiform)
