= Pixel (band) =

Norwegian experimental jazz band

- Origin: Oslo, Norway
- Genres: Jazz
- Years active: 2011–present
- Label: Cuneiform
- Members: Jonas Kilmork Vemøy; Harald Lassen; Jon Audun Baar; Ellen Andrea Wang
- Website: Official website

Pixel (established 2011 in Oslo, Norway) is a Norwegian experimental jazz band.

== Biography ==
The debut album Reminder (2012) by Pixel was well received. This is one of the most exciting bands to come out of the extremely active Norwegian jazz scene in recent years (2011-13). All About Jazz critique Bruce Lindsay states:

Reminder is an impressive first outing. Pixel bring a unique creative mix to the scene: difficult music to categorize, easy music to enjoy...

Pixel combine the sounds of the classic, piano-less, ‘modern Jazz’ quartet lineup of saxophone, trumpet, bass and drums reminiscent of legendary Jazz artist Ornette Coleman, Gerry Mulligan etc., yet carries the energy and attitude of indie rock (all of the players are born around the year 1986). Led by bassist and vocalist Ellen Andrea Wang, Pixel has been together since 2013. The band members are all very active on the Scandinavian jazz scene, as is Pixel themselves. Like similarly forward thinking groups like The Bad Plus, their style of jazz is that of rock audiences can relate to, and it has great cross-over potential. The gig by «Pixel», was noted as "one of the most memorable moments" of the Match and Fuse Festival, by the Jazz magazine Down Beat. Their concert at Jazz Baltica festival on June 24, 2017 was recorded and was broadcast by the German national public radio "Deutschlandfunk" all over Germany. Parts of the concert are available on YouTube.

Saxophone player Harald Lassen left the band in 2017

== Band members ==
- Ellen Andrea Wang - double bass and vocals
- Jonas Kilmork Vemøy - trumpet
- Harald Lassen - saxophone (2010 - 2017)
- Jon Audun Baar - drums

== Honors ==
- 2013: Featured at Young Nordic Jazz Comets

== Discography ==
- 2012: Reminder (Cuneiform Records)
- 2013: We Are All Small Pixels (Cuneiform Records)
- 2015: Golden Years (Cuneiform Records)
