= 1986 in Norwegian music =

The following is a list of notable events and releases of the year 1986 in Norwegian music.

== Events ==
=== March ===
- 21 – The 13th Vossajazz started in Vossavangen, Norway (March 21 – 23).

=== May ===
- 21 – 14th Nattjazz started in Bergen, Norway (May 21 – June 4).

=== July ===
- 3 – The 17th Kalvøyafestivalen started at Kalvøya near by Oslo.

== Albums released ==
=== Unknown date ===
G

Jan Garbarek

- Ο Μελισσοκόμος (The Beekeeper) (Minos Records), with Ελένη Καραϊνδρου (Eleni Karaindrou)

J

Bjørn Johansen Quartet

- Dear Henrik (Gemini Records)

K

Karin Krog

- Freestyle (Odin Records), with John Surman

== Deaths ==
March

- 22 – Eyvind Hesselberg, organist, composer, and orchestra conductor (born 1898).

August

- 6 – Hans-Jørgen Holman, musicologist and educationalist (born 1925).

October

- 22 – Thorgeir Stubø, jazz guitarist, band leader, and composer (born 1943).

November

- 23 – Svein Øvergaard, jazz saxophonist and percussionist (born 1912).
- 24 – Bias Bernhoft, singer and revue writer (born 1902).

== Births ==
January

- 12 – Philip Schjetlein, jazz guitarist.

February

- 12 – Maria Norseth Garli, singer and composer.
- 19 – Maria Mena, pop singer.

March

- 19 – Susanne Sundfør, singer and songwriter.

April

- 3 – Thomas Wærnes, rapper.

July

- 11 – Jakop Janssønn Hauan, jazz drummer.

August

- 19 – Vilde Frang, classical violinist.

September

- 1 – Stella Mwangi, singer, songwriter, and rapper.
- 15 – William Wiik Larsen, record producer and songwriter.

October

- 10 – Ellen Andrea Wang, jazz upright-bassist and singer.
- 12 – Jonas Kilmork Vemøy, jazz trumpeter, and composer.
- 13 – Miss Tati, DJ, singer, and songwriter.

November

- 14 – Espen Wensaas, guitarist and multi-instrumentalist.

Unknown date

- Jon Audun Baar, jazz drummer.
- Emilie Stoesen Christensen, jazz singer and actor.
- Lars Ove Fossheim, jazz guitarist.

== See also ==
- 1986 in Norway
- Music of Norway
- Norway in the Eurovision Song Contest 1986
