= 1908 in Nordic music =

The following is a list of notable events and releases of the year 1908 in Nordic music.

== Events ==
- 12 May – Jean Sibelius undergoes a preliminary operation for suspected throat cancer. On doctors' advice, he travels to Berlin for further operations, which are eventually successful, and he spends July recuperating.
- 28 September – Swedish baritone John Forsell gives a recital in Stockholm, accompanied by Finnish composer Armas Järnefelt at the piano.
- October – US sound recordist Fred Gaisberg visits Stockholm and records baritone August Svenson singing "I Småland där ä' de' så gutt, gutt, gutt"
- unknown date
  - Armas Järnefelt and his wife, soprano Maikki Pakarinen, are divorced, following her affair with composer Selim Palmgren, whom she subsequently marries.
  - Leevi Madetoja is accepted for private tuition by Jean Sibelius.

== New works ==
- Hugo Alfvén – Drapa
- Toivo Kuula – Piano Trio
- Erkki Melartin – Pienoiskuvia III, Op.53
- Carl Nielsen – Saga-Drøm (tone poem)
- Jean Sibelius
  - Nightride and Sunrise
  - Swanwhite, incidental music for a play by August Strindberg

== Popular music ==
- Edwin Ericsson and Olof Thunman – "Vi gå över daggstänkta berg"

== Births ==
- 20 February – Seymour Österwall, Swedish jazz musician, bandleader and composer (died 1981)
- 24 March – Birgit Åkesson, Swedish choreographer, dancer and dance researcher (died 2001)
- 15 May – Lars-Erik Larsson, Swedish conductor and composer (died 1986)
- 20 July – Gunnar de Frumerie, Swedish pianist and composer (died 1987)
- 3 August – Birgit Cullberg choreographer (died 1999)
- 31 August – Conrad Baden, Norwegian organist, composer, teacher and music critic (died 1989).
- 1 October – Herman David Koppel, Danish composer (died 1998)
- 19 October – Geirr Tveitt, Norwegian composer (died 1981)
- 8 November – Henning Elbirk, Danish conductor and composer (died 1985)

== Deaths ==
- 8 June – Johan Lindegren, Swedish composer, musician and teacher (born 1842)
- 11 June – August Lagergren, Swedish organist and composer (born 1848)

== See also ==
- 1908 in Denmark
- 1908 in Norwegian music
- 1908 in Sweden
- 1908 in Iceland
