= 1981 in Nordic music =

The following is a list of notable events and releases that happened in Nordic music in 1981.

== Events ==
- 5 January – Björn Ulvaeus, now divorced from Agnetha Fältskog, marries Lena Källersjö.
- 4 April – At the 26th Eurovision Song Contest, Sweden is the best-performing of the Nordic countries, finishing 10th. Denmark are 11th, Finland 16th, and Norway finish in 20th (last) place, with no votes from other countries.
- September – Icelandic musicians Björk Guðmundsdóttir and bassist Jakob Magnússon form a new band, Tappi Tíkarrass.
- 31 December – Benny Andersson, recently divorced from Anni-Frid Lyngstad, marries TV presenter Mona Nörklit.
- unknown date
  - The organ at the Heinävesi Church in Finland is renewed, using some of the stops from the original organ.
  - Danish musician Lars Ulrich meets James Hetfield and they form the band Metallica.

== Classical works ==
- Ulf Grahn – Concertino for piano and Strings
- Bengt Hambraeus – Voluntary on a Swedish Hymn Tune from Dalecarlia
- Magnus Lindberg – Sculpture II

== Hit singles ==
- ABBA – "One of Us" (#1 Belgium, Denmark, Netherlands, West Germany)
- Beranek – "Dra til hælvete" (#1 Norway)
- Gyllene Tider – "Ljudet av ett annat hjärta" (#3 Sweden)
- Thomas Ledin – "Sensuella Isabella" (#4 Sweden)
- Eddie Meduza – "Gasen i botten" (#13 Sweden)
- Björn Skifs – "Fångad i en dröm" (#10 Sweden)

== Film music ==
- Erling D. Bjerno – Jeppe på bjerget
- Henrik Otto Donner – Pedon merkki

== Births ==
- 10 December – Paula Vesala, Finnish singer-songwriter

== Deaths ==
- 1 February – Geirr Tveitt, Norwegian composer
- 22 May – Reimar Riefling, Norwegian classical pianist, music teacher, and music critic (born 1898).
- 25 May – Georg Malmstén, Finnish entertainer (born 1902)
- 23 June – Zarah Leander, Swedish actress and singer (born 1907)
- 3 August – Seymour Österwall, Swedish tenor saxophonist, bandleader, and composer (born 1908)
- 5 October – Sven Gyldmark, Danish film score composer (born 1904)

== See also ==
- 1981 in Denmark
- 1981 in Iceland
- 1981 in Norwegian music
- 1981 in Sweden
