= 1986 in Nordic music =

The following is a list of notable events and releases that happened in Nordic music in 1986.

== Events ==
- 24 January – Kukl release their second and final album, Holidays in Europe (The Naughty Nought), on Crass Records.
- 3 May – At the 31st Eurovision Song Contest, held in Bergen, Sweden is the best-performing of the Scandinavian countries, in 5th place, with Denmark 6th. Norway finish 12th, Finland 15th and Iceland 16th. Sissel Kyrkjebø's appearance during the interval leads to her career taking off.
- 8 June – The Sugarcubes form in Iceland, with Björk Guðmundsdóttir as their lead vocalist.
- 10 June – Swedish doom metal band Candlemass release their debut album, Epicus Doomicus Metallicus, on Black Dragon Records. Sales are disappointing and the label drops the band.
- 27 September – A tour bus carrying the heavy metal band Metallica crashes in Sweden. One of the band's members, Cliff Burton, is killed.

== Classical works ==
- Ole Buck – Rejong
- Vagn Holmboe – Ten Preludes for Sinfonietta: No 1 To a Pine Tree; No 2 To a Dolphin; No 3 To a Maple Tree
- Per Nørgård
  - Viola Concerto No. 1, "Remembering Child"
  - Najader (The Naiads)

== Hit singles ==
- A-ha
  - "Hunting High and Low" (#4 France, Ireland; #5 Italy, UK)
  - "I've Been Losing You" (#1 Denmark, Norway)
- Dingo – "Pyhä klaani" (#1 Finland)
- Europe – "The Final Countdown"
- Kim Larsen (solo) – "Om lidt" (#9 Denmark)
- Kim Larsen & Bellami
  - "Jutlandia" (#11 Denmark)
  - "Vi er dem"
- Roxette – "Neverending Love" (#3 Sweden)
- Pernilla Wahlgren – "Paradise" (#6 Sweden)

== Eurovision Song Contest ==
- Denmark in the Eurovision Song Contest 1986
- Finland in the Eurovision Song Contest 1986
- Iceland in the Eurovision Song Contest 1986
- Norway in the Eurovision Song Contest 1986
- Sweden in the Eurovision Song Contest 1986

== Film and television music ==
- Geir Bøhren, Arne Nordheim & Bent Åserud – Hud
- Anne Linnet – Barndommens gade

== Births ==
- 18 March – Lykke Li, Swedish singer-songwriter
- 19 March – Susanne Sundfør, Norwegian singer-songwriter and record producer
- 13 May – Alexander Rybak, Belarus-born Norwegian singer
- 8 June – Sindri Eldon Þórsson, son of Icelandic musicians Björk and Þór Eldon Jónsson

== Deaths ==
- 19 April – Dag Wirén, Swedish composer (born 1905)
- 6 August – Hans-Jørgen Holman, Norwegian musicologist and educationalist (born 1925)
- 30 August – Otto Mortensen, Danish pianist, organist, conductor and composer (born 1907)
- 22 October – Thorgeir Stubø, Norwegian jazz guitarist (born 1943)
- 23 November – Svein Øvergaard, Norwegian jazz saxophonist and percussionist (born 1912).
- 24 November – Bias Bernhoft, Norwegian singer and revue writer (born 1902).
- 27 December – Lars-Erik Larsson, Swedish conductor and composer (born 1908)
