= 1992 in Norwegian music =

The following is a list of notable events and releases of the year 1992 in Norwegian music.

== Events ==
=== April ===
- 10 – The 19th Vossajazz started in Vossavangen, Norway (April 10 – 12).

=== May ===
- 20 – The 20th Nattjazz started in Bergen, Norway (May 20 – 31).

=== June ===
- 27 – The 23rd Kalvøyafestivalen started at Kalvøya near by Oslo (June 27 – 28).

=== August ===
- 21 – The 5th Notodden Blues Festival started in Notodden (August 21 – 23).

=== Unknown date ===
- The band Storytellers was initiated.

== Albums released ==
=== Unknown date ===
B

Jon Balke

- Nonsentration (ECM Records) with Oslo 13

G

Jan Garbarek

- Ragas and Sagas (ECM Records) with Ustad Fateh Ali Khan and Musicians from Pakistan

== Deaths ==
March

- 27 – Harald Sæverud, composer (born 1897).
- 28 – Elisabeth Granneman, singer, songwriter, children's writer and actress (born 1930).

August

- 3 – Finn Ludt (73), pianist and harpsichordist, best known as an organist (born 1918).

== Births ==
January

- 17 – Kristian B. Jacobsen, jazz bassist and composer.
- 20 – Anders Eikås, rock drummer of Honningbarna (died 2012).

March

- 6 – Lukas Zabulionis, jazz saxophonist and composer.
- 15 – Elisabeth Lid Trøen, jazz saxophonist and composer.

April

- 6 – Mathias Stubø, electronica artist and DJ.

May

- 9 – Ingrid Søfteland Neset, classical flautist.
- 25 – Krissy Matthews, blues rock singer, songwriter and guitarist.

September

- 9 – Frida Amundsen, singer and songwriter.

Unknown date

- Siril Malmedal Hauge, jazz singer, composer and band leader.

== See also ==
- 1992 in Norway
- Music of Norway
- Norway in the Eurovision Song Contest 1992
