= Venues of the 1994 Winter Olympics =

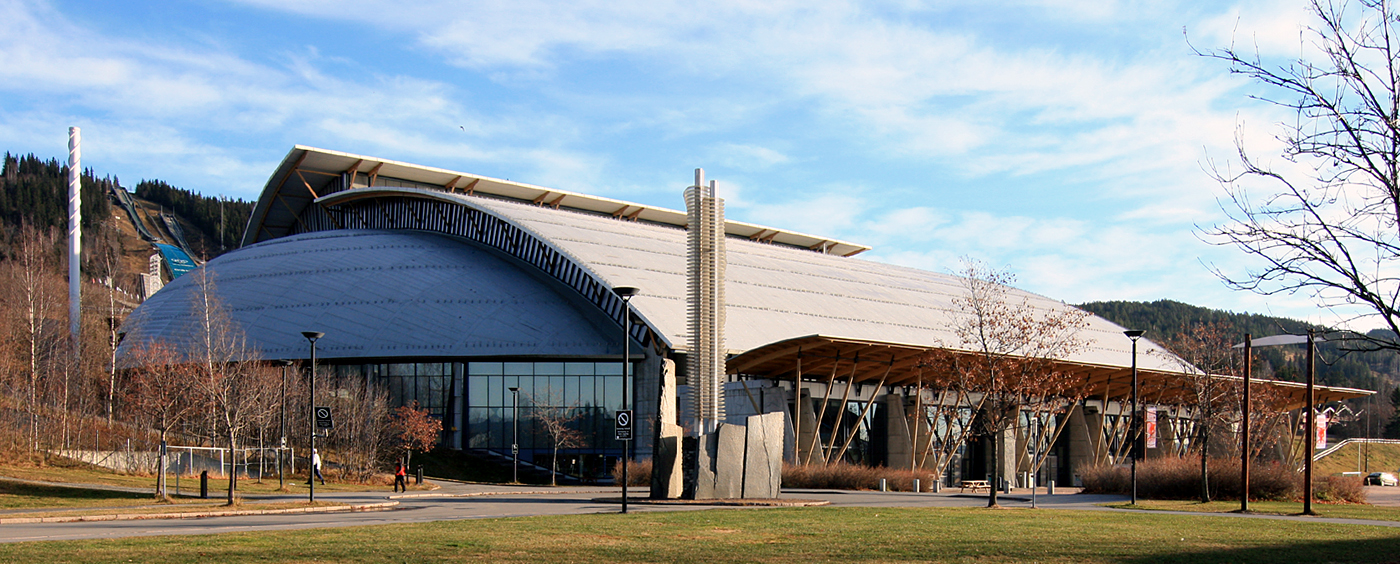
Håkon Hall, one of two ice hockey venues, hosted the final event.

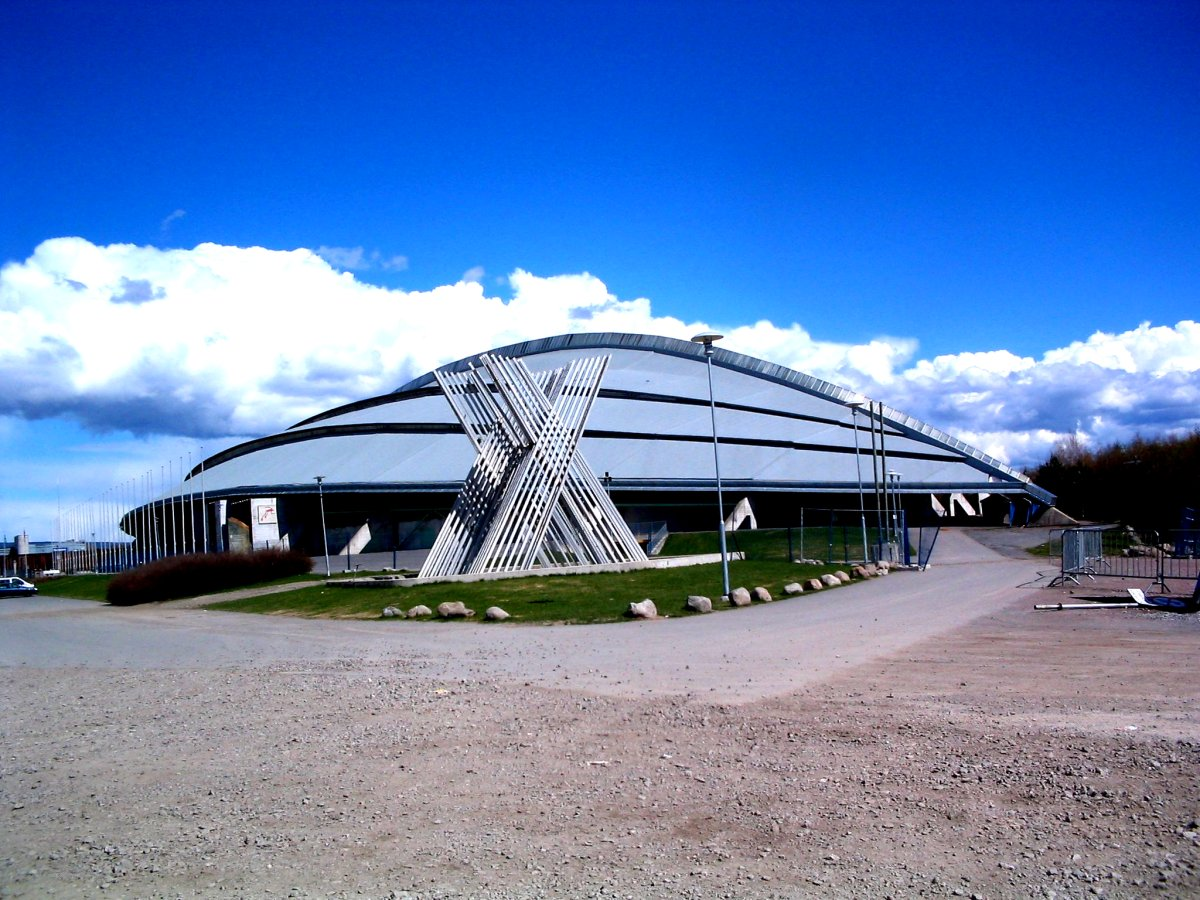
Hamar Olympic Hall, the venue for speed skating

The 1994 Winter Olympics were held in and around Lillehammer, Norway, from 12 to 27 February 1994. Ten competition and fourteen non-competition venues were used, most of which were subsequently used for the 1994 Winter Paralympics. The Games were spread out over ten venues in five municipalities in two counties, Oppland and Hedmark. Lillehammer Municipality, with approximately 25,000 inhabitants, and Hamar Municipality and Gjøvik Municipality, both with approximately 27,000 inhabitants, are all situated on the lake Mjøsa. Gjøvik and Hamar are 45 and 54 kilometers (28 and 34 mi) south of Lillehammer, respectively. Hunderfossen is 15 kilometers (9.3 mi) north of the town of Lillehammer, but located within Lillehammer Municipality. Øyer Municipality and Ringebu Municipality, each with just under 5,000 inhabitants, are 18 and 50 kilometers (11 and 31 mi) north of Lillehammer, respectively, in the valley Gudbrandsdalen. Lillehammer had four competition venues, Hamar had two competition venues, while Hunderfossen, Gjøvik, Øyer and Ringebu had one competition venue each.

In Lillehammer, Lysgårdsbakkene Ski Jumping Arena features twin ski jumping hills. The large hill has a hill size of 138 and a K-point of 120, while the normal hill has a hill size of 100 and a critical point of 90. The hill has capacity for 35,000 spectators and hosted, in addition to the ski jumping events, the opening and closing ceremonies. Birkebeineren Ski Stadium featured cross-country skiing and biathlon, with the stadium itself having a capacity for 31,000 spectators during cross-country skiing and 13,500 during biathlon. In addition, spectators could watch from along the tracks. For the cross-country men's 4 × 10 km relay, over 203,000 people applied for the 31,000 seats. Kanthaugen Freestyle Arena featured a capacity for 15,000 spectators. All the outdoor skiing arenas had free areas, which saw up to 25,000 extra spectators at the team jump and 75,000 extra spectators at the 50 km.

Lillehammer Olympic Bobsleigh and Luge Track is located at Hunderfossen. It had a capacity for 10,000 spectators and is the only bobsleigh and luge track in the Nordic countries. Ice hockey was played at two venues: Håkon Hall in Lillehammer and Gjøvik Olympic Cavern Hall in Gjøvik. Håkon Hall has a capacity for 10,500 spectators, and also features the Norwegian Olympic Museum. The Cavern Hall is built as a man-made cave and had a capacity for 5,300 spectators. Skating events took place at two venues in Hamar. Hamar Olympic Hall had a capacity for 10,600 spectators and featured speed skating events, while figure skating and short track speed skating was held at Hamar Olympic Amphitheatre. Alpine skiing was split between two ski resorts: Hafjell in Øyer and Kvitfjell in Ringebu. The former was used for the slalom and giant slalom, while the latter hosted downhill and super-G.

Athlete and leader accommodation was provided for 2,300 people at Lillehammer Olympic Village, which was located at Skårsetlia. Toneheim Folk High School's dormitories and surrounding areas, named Hamar Olympic Subsite Village, hosted 500 athletes. Media accommodation was split between five locations, two in Lillehammer, two in Øyer and one in Hamar. The main working accommodation for the media was the International Broadcast Center and the Main Press Center, both located at Storhove in Lillehammer. Lillehammer Art Museum and Maihaugen where the official culture venues, with the latter hosting the 102nd IOC Session.

Venue construction ran from spring 1990 to December 1993. All the competition and most of the non-competition venues were purpose-built for the Games. For the first time in Olympic history, environmental and sustainability issues were considered in venue construction. This resulted in five venues being modified during their design and construction phase to lessen their impact upon the environment. Among the issues considered were the venues blending into surrounding landscape, treatment of terrain with as minimal damage to natural surroundings as possible, use of environmentally-friendly materials, and environmental auditing. Gjøvik Olympic Cavern Hall was constructed inside a mountain that maintained a year-round temperature of −8 °C (18 °F), with the excavated rock used to build a beach promenade. Transport was dominated by the use of buses and trains for spectators. Downtown Lillehammer and the axis between Lillehammer and Oslo were the most congested areas, and the Norwegian State Railways ran up to 22 trains per day between Oslo and Lillehammer. All venues could be reached within walking distance from train stations.

== Competition venues ==
Map of the venues

The following list contains the ten venues used for competitions during the 1994 Winter Olympics. They are listed by their name during the Games, as well as containing the sports held at the venue, the municipality where they are located, the spectator capacity, and the cost of constructing the venue in millions of Norwegian krone (MNOK).

Venue	Sports(s)	Location	Capacity	Cost (MNOK)	Ref(s)
Birkebeineren Ski Stadium	Biathlon, cross-country skiing, Nordic combined (cross-country skiing)	Lillehammer	34,000	81	
Gjøvik Olympic Cavern Hall	Ice hockey	Gjøvik	5,300	92	
Håkon Hall	Ice hockey	Lillehammer	10,500	240	
Hamar Olympic Amphitheatre	Figure skating, short track speed skating	Hamar	6,000	87	
Hamar Olympic Hall	Speed skating	Hamar	10,600	222	
Kanthaugen Freestyle Arena	Freestyle skiing	Lillehammer	15,000	17	
Lillehammer Olympic Alpine Centre Hafjell	Alpine skiing (slalom, giant slalom, combined)	Øyer	30,000	72	
Lillehammer Olympic Alpine Centre Kvitfjell	Alpine skiing (downhill, super-G, combined)	Ringebu	41,000	122	
Lillehammer Olympic Bobsleigh and Luge Track	Bobsleigh, luge	Lillehammer	10,000	204	
Lysgårdsbakkene Ski Jumping Arena	Nordic combined (ski jumping), ski jumping, opening and closing ceremonies	Lillehammer	35,000	135	

== Non-competition venues ==
The following list contains the fourteen non-competition venues used during the 1994 Winter Olympics. They are listed with their function, location, capacity, size in square meters and square feet, and the cost of construction, in millions of Norwegian krone (MNOK). For existing structures, the cost indicates what was used to upgrade them ahead of the Games.

Venue	Type	Location	Capacity	Size (m^{2})	Size (sq ft)	Cost (MNOK)	Ref(s)
Stampesletta	Medal ceremonies	Lillehammer	30,000	—	—	—	
International Broadcast Center	Media center	Lillehammer	—	27,000	290,000	470	
Main Press Center	Media center	Lillehammer	3,000	15,000	160,000	—	
Lillehammer Olympic Village	Athlete accommodation	Lillehammer	2,300	55,000	590,000	250	
Hamar Olympic Subsite Village	Athlete accommodation	Hamar	500	6,450	69,400	—	
Hafjelltoppen	Media accommodation	Øyer	1,500	—	—	—	
Sørlia	Media accommodation	Øyer	580	—	—	—	
Jorekstad	Media accommodation	Lillehammer	1,058	—	—	—	
Storhove	Media accommodation	Lillehammer	2,400	—	—	—	
Snekkerstua	Media accommodation	Hamar	507	—	—	—	
Lillehammer Hotel	VIP accommodation	Lillehammer	—	—	—	—	
Lillehammer Art Museum	Culture	Lillehammer	—	3,100	33,000	52	
Maihaugen	Culture, IOC Session	Lillehammer	750	—	—	139	

== Post-Olympic use ==
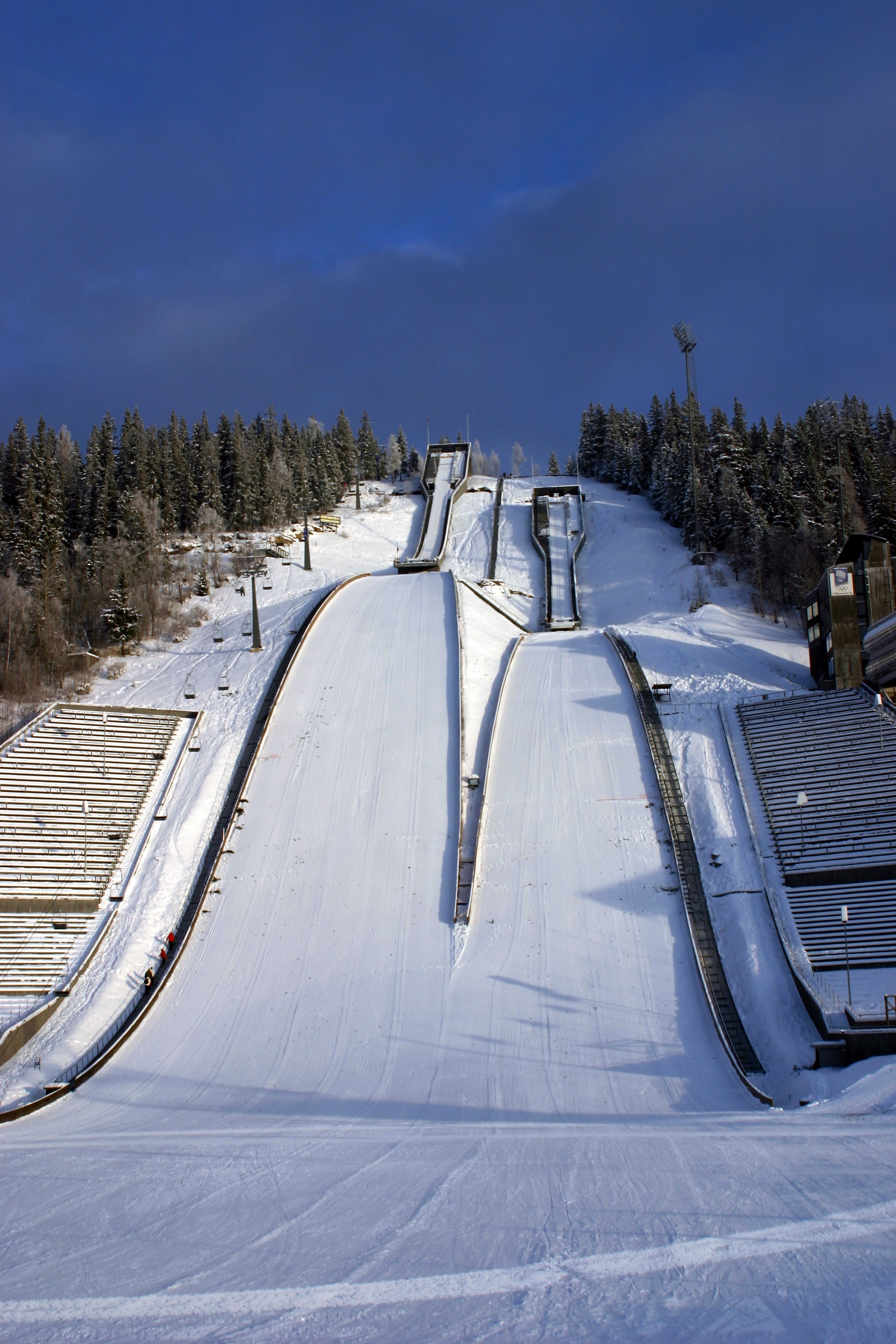
Lysgårdsbakken has hosted the Nordic Tournament several times.

Hamar Olympic Hall hosted the World Allround Speed Skating Championships for Men and the UCI Track Cycling World Championships in 1993. Following the Games, it has hosted the World Allround Speed Skating World Championships in 1999, 2004 and 2009. The venue also hosted the World Sprint Speed Skating Championships in 1997, 2002 and 2007, and the World Single Distance Championships in 1996.

Lillehammer Olympic Bobsleigh and Luge Track hosted the skeleton part of the FIBT World Championships in 1995, as well as the FIL World Luge Championships in 1995. Birkebeineren hosted its last Biathlon World Cup event in 1997, and its last cross-country skiing World Cup event was in March 2002. The FIS Nordic Combined World Cup has been hosted in Lillehammer on various occasions, most recently in December 2010. Lysgårdsbakken has served as part of the Nordic Tournament from 2004 through 2006 and from 2008 through 2009. Håkon Hall and Gjøvik played host to the World Women's Handball Championship in 1999, while the 1999 Men's World Ice Hockey Championships used Håkon Hall and Hamar Olympic Amphitheatre.

The sports venues were taken over by the respective municipalities. The Lillehammer venues are owned by the municipal Lillehammer Olympiapark, while similar companies were created for Hamar and Gjøvik. The International Broadcast Center was built as a future campus for Lillehammer University College. The Main Press Center was converted to a business park. Only part of the athlete accommodation was built for permanent use, and was sold as regular housing after the Games. The rest was built as mobile units and sold to other parts of the country. Similarly, the media accommodation was built as a mix of permanent and temporary housing, with the latter being sold as cottages after the Games were completed.
