= Tvinnereim =

Tvinnereim is a surname. Notable people with the surname include:

- Anne Beathe Tvinnereim (born 1974), Norwegian politician
- Erlend Tvinnereim (born 1981), Norwegian tenor
