= 1912 in Norwegian music =

The following is a list of notable events and releases of the year 1912 in Norwegian music.

== Deaths ==
December

- 28 – Ola Mosafinn, hardingfele fiddler and composer (born 1828).

== Births ==
January

- 1 – Svein Øvergaard, jazz saxophonist and percussionist (died 1986).

May

- 19 – Jens Gunderssen, singer, songwriter, actor, stage producer, and theatre director (died 1969).

June

- 6 – Robert Levin, classical pianist and composer (died 1996).

November

- 26 – Gunnar Sønstevold, composer and pianist (died 1991).

December

- 12 – Thorbjørn Egner, actress, children's writer, songwriter, playwright and illustrator (died 1990).

== See also ==
- 1912 in Norway
- Music of Norway
