= 1991 in Norwegian music =

The following is a list of notable events and releases of the year 1991 in Norwegian music.

== Events ==
=== March ===
- 22 – The 18th Vossajazz started in Vossavangen, Norway (March 22 – 24).

=== May ===
- 22 – The 19th Nattjazz started in Bergen, Norway (May 22 – June 2).

=== June ===
- 28 – The 22nd Kalvøyafestivalen started at Kalvøya near by Oslo (June 28 – 29).

=== August ===
- 23 – The 4th Notodden Blues Festival started in Notodden (August 23 – 25).

== Albums released ==
=== Unknown date ===
B

Jon Balke

- On And On (Odin Records)with Per Jørgensen and Audun Kleive

G

Jan Garbarek

- StAR (ECM Records), with Miroslav Vitous and Peter Erskine

K

Bjørn Howard Kruse

- Service For The Nervois (Hot Club Records), with Warren Carlstrom and Celio de Carvalho

== Deaths ==
January

- 29 – Ingebrigt Davik, teacher, children's writer, broadcasting personality, singer and songwriter (born 1925).

April

- 1 – Bjarne Nerem, jazz saxophonist (born 1923).
- 2 - Per Yngve Ohlin Black metal vocalist in Morbid (1986 - 1988) and Mayhem (1988 - 1991) (born 1969)

June

- 27 – Øistein "Tinka" Ringstad, jazz pianist and vibrafonist (born 1927).

July

- 7 – Jan Wølner, classical pianist (born 1909).
- 31 – Magne Elvestrand, pianist and harpsichordist, best known as an organist (born 1914).

October

- 17 – Kurt Foss, composer, singer and vaudeville artist (born 1925).
- 18 – Gunnar Sønstevold, composer (born 1912).

== Births ==
January

- 24 – Monica Heldal, singer, songwriter, and guitarist.

February

- 4 – Kjetil Mulelid, jazz pianist and composer.
- 26 – Emil Solli-Tangen, operatic singer.

April

- 10 – Andreas Skår Winther, jazz drummer.

September

- 11 – Kygo, DJ, record producer, songwriter, and pianist.

October

- 20 – Henrik Lødøen, jazz drummer.

November

- 28 – Bendik Baksaas, Norwegian electronica artist.

== See also ==
- 1991 in Norway
- Music of Norway
- Norway in the Eurovision Song Contest 1991
