= 1989 in Norwegian music =

The following is a list of notable events and releases of the year 1989 in Norwegian music.

== Events ==
=== March ===
- 17 – The 16th Vossajazz started in Vossavangen, Norway (March 17 – 19).

=== May ===
- 24 – The 17th Nattjazz started in Bergen, Norway (May 24 – June 7).

=== June ===
- 25 – The 20th Kalvøyafestivalen started at Kalvøya near by Oslo

=== September ===
- 1 – The 2nd Notodden Blues Festival started in Notodden (September 1 – 3).

== Albums released ==
=== Unknown date ===
G

Agnes Buen Garnås

- Rosensfole (ECM Records), with Jan Garbarek

K

Karin Krog

- Something Borrowed ... Something New (Meantime Records)

== Deaths ==
August

- 31 – Conrad Baden, organist, composer, music educator, and music critic (born 1908).

December

- 28 – Fred Lange-Nielsen, jazz bassist and vocalist (born 1919).

== Births ==
January

- 4 – Trond Bersu, Electronica and jazz drummer and vocalist.

February

- 6 – Marius Njølstad, singer, songwriter and music producer.
- 8 – Matias Tellez, singer, songwriter, composer and music producer.

May

- 8 – Christian Skår Winther, jazz guitarist.
- 20 – Ingrid Helene Håvik, songwriter and vocalist.

June

- 6 – Kristoffer Eikrem, jazz trumpeter, composer and photographer.
- 23 – Amina Sewali, singer, songwriter, and actress.

October

- 27 – Jakob Terjesønn Rypdal, jazz guitarist.

November

- 20 – Magnus Skavhaug Nergaard, jazz upright-bassist.

Unknown date

- Berit Hagen, guitarist and singer.
- Hans Hulbækmo, drummer, vibraphonist, and composer.

== See also ==
- 1989 in Norway
- Music of Norway
- Norway in the Eurovision Song Contest 1989
