= 1902 in Nordic music =

The following is a list of notable events and releases of the year 1902 in Nordic music.

== Events ==
- 9 April – The Finnish National Theatre's new building opens with the premiere of Finnish composer Jean Sibelius's The Origin of Fire ("Tulen synty").
- 28 November – Danish composer Carl Nielsen's opera Saul og David receives its premiere in Copenhagen
- 1 December – Carl Nielsen conducts the premiere of his Symphony No. 2, De fire Temperamenter ("The Four Temperaments").
- unknown date – Norwegian composer Edvard Grieg produces the first of his Slåtter (Norwegian Peasant Dances).

== New works ==
- Carl Nielsen
  - Symphony No. 2
  - Saul og David
- Jean Sibelius
  - "Lastu lainehilla" ("Driftwood") from Seven Songs, Op. 17
  - Symphony No. 2

== Popular music ==
- Vilhelm Svedbom – "Hej dunkom"

== Births ==
- 7 May – Jolly Kramer-Johansen, Norwegian composer (died 1968)
- 27 June – Georg Malmstén, Finnish entertainer (died 1981)
- 30 October – Bias Bernhoft, Norwegian singer and revue writer (died 1986).
- 21 November – Harald Lie, solo cellist for the Oslo Philharmonic (died 1942).

== Deaths ==
- 7 January – Adolfina Fägerstedt (90), Swedish ballet dancer
- 17 January – Elias Blix (65), Norwegian organist and composer
- 19 August – Lars Fykerud (42), Norwegian Hardanger fiddler and composer
- 12 April – Herman Amberg (67), Danish composer

== See also ==
- 1902 in Denmark
- 1902 in Norway
- 1902 in Sweden
