= 1907 in Nordic music =

The following is a list of notable events and releases of the year 1907 in Nordic music.

== Events ==
- 25 September – Jean Sibelius conducts the première of his Symphony No. 3 in C major Op.52 in Helsinki.
- 29 December – At the opening ceremony of K.F.U.K's building in Stockholm, Alice Tegnér's new composition "Skapare, Fader" is performed for the first time.

== New works ==
- Hugo Alfvén – Swedish Rhapsody No. 2, Op. 24 (Uppsalarapsodi)
- Carl Nielsen – Strophic Songs, Op.21
- Ture Rangström – Ver Sacrum
- Jean Sibelius – Symphony No. 3 in C major, Op. 52

== Popular music ==
- Alice Tegnér – "Skapare, Fader"

== Births ==
- 16 February – Eugen Malmstén, Finnish jazz musician, singer, conductor and composer (died 1993)
- 15 March – Zarah Leander, Swedish singer and actress (died 1981)
- 18 August – Otto Mortensen, Danish composer (died 1986)

== Deaths ==
- 28 May – Valdemar Tofte, Danish violinist and teacher (born 1832)
- 4 June – Agathe Backer-Grøndahl, Norwegian pianist and composer (born 1847)
- 4 September – Edvard Grieg, Norwegian composer (born 1843)
- 5 September – Adolf Østbye, first Norwegian recording artist (born 1868)
- 6 December – Hilda Thegerström, Swedish pianist and composer (born 1838)

== See also ==
- 1907 in Denmark
- 1907 in Norwegian music
- 1907 in Sweden
