= Ingrid Vetlesen =

Norwegian soprano (born 1981)

- Born: 22 September 1981 (age 44); Oslo, Norway
- Genres: Classical music
- Occupation: Opera singer (soprano)
- Instrument: Vocals
- Website: ingridvetlesen.com

Ingrid Vetlesen (born 22 September 1981) is a Norwegian soprano.

== Career ==
Vetlesen was born in Oslo, Norway. She started singing at an early age, and was involved in choirs until she got interested in Opera music at the age of 17 while attending the Music program at «Rud videregående skole». She attended Toneheim Folkehøgskole in 2000 together with Erlend Tvinnereim, Marit Tøndel Bodsberg, Audun Iversen, Lina Johnson, Kjetil Støa, Nina Sæterhaug among others, where her formal musical studies continued, and now she is a graduate of Tromsø musikkonservatorium, University of Tromsø 2003, Stavanger Musikkonservatorium, University of Stavanger 2005, and The Royal Danish Opera Academy.

While studying, Vetlesen sang Adina and Norina in Donizetti's L’Elisir d’Amore and Don Pasquale, Gretel in Humperdinck's Hänsel und Gretel, Gilda in Verdi's Rigoletto, Juliette in Gounod's Roméo et Juliette, Frasquita in Bizet's Carmen, Sophie in Der Rosenkavalier by Strauss, Musetta in Puccini's La Bohème, Susanna and Ilia in Mozart's Le Nozze di Figaro and Idomeneo. She had her debut at the Royal Danish Opera in Caroline Mathilde (2006), in a ballet by Flemming Flint, composed by Peter Maxwell Davies, where she had the part of the opera singer. In 2008, she made her operatic debut as Barbarina in Mozart's Le Nozze di Figaro at the Royal Danish Opera in Copenhagen. This debut was a resounding success. She later sang Tebaldo in Verdi's Don Carlos, also at the Royal Danish Opera, Gianetta in Donizetti's L’Elisir d’Amore at Aarhus Summer Opera, Denmark, and she was invited to play the role of Rosalind in Shakespeare's Romeo and Juliet at the Norwegian Nationaltheatret in Norway 2010. In 2011 she had the role of Susanna in The Marriage of Figaro at the «Fjøsfestivalen» in Loddgarde, and the summer of 2013, she had the role of Despina in Cosi fan tutte av Mozart at Dubrovnik International Summer Festival.

Vetlesen was a soloist in Schnittke's Requiem, Pergolesi's Stabat Mater, Bach's Christmas Oratorio, Händel's Israel in Egypt, Mozart's Große Messe, Gounod's St. Cecilia Mass and Schubert'’s Mass in G. She has held chamber concerts as a lied-singer in Norway, Denmark and France. In 2009, she was Kurt Ravn's guest soloist on his annual Christmas tour. Vetlesen has also appeared twice as a festival artist at the "Barn Festival" at Loddgarden and Oslo Grieg Festival in 2010 and 2011. She has been awarded numerous scholarships in Norway and in Denmark. In 2007, she was a finalist in the Queen Sonja National Music Competition and in 2009, she won the first prize and the audience award in the Opera Grand Prix at the Oslo Opera Festival. She is working as a freelance musician.

In 2006 Vetlesen participated in the competition "Kjempesjansen" on Norwegian television NRK.

== Honors ==
- 2009: 1'st prize in the Opera Grand Prix at the Oslo Opera Festival
- 2009: Audience award in the Opera Grand Prix at the Oslo Opera Festival

== Discography ==
- 2007: The Great Polar Expedition (Karisma Records), with Anders Hana's Vaiping («Vendetta»)
