= Kristian B. Jacobsen =

Norwegian bassist (born 1992)

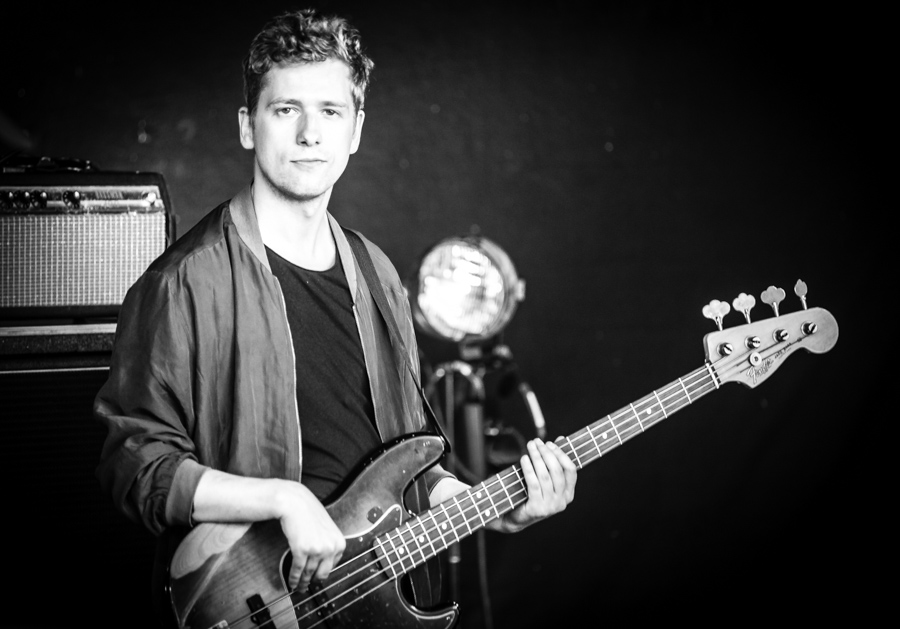
Jacobsen in 2018

Kristian Breivik Jacobsen (born 17 January 1992 in Bodø, Norway) is a Norwegian bassist.

== Biography ==
Jacobsen studied music at Norwegian Academy of Music (2012–2013) before joining the jazz program at Norwegian University of Science and Technology (2013–2016).

He is part of the Norwegian soul/jazz quartet Rohey together with vocalist Rohey Taalah, keyboardist and composer Ivan Blomqvist and drummer Henrik Lødøen. Together they have toured all over Scandinavia and Europe, and visited most jazz festivals and venues available. Rohey released their debut album A Million Things in 2017 on the label Jazzland Recordings.

== Honors ==
- 2018: Nominated to the year's newcomer and Gramo scolorship during Spellemannsprisen as part of Rohey
- 2015: Young Talents Scholarship by Norwegian Association for Composers and Lyricists

== Discography ==
=== With Rohey ===
- 2017: A Million Things (Jazzland Recordings)

=== With DRØM ===
- 2017: Drømmen Om Oss (Vilje Recordings)

=== With Lukas Zabulionis ===
- 2016: Changing Tides (Curling Legs)
