= 1925 in Norwegian music =

The following is a list of notable events and releases of the year 1925 in Norwegian music.

== Events ==
The Norwegian Broadcasting Corporation (NRK) started its transmission in 1925.

== Deaths ==
July

- 5 – Hjalmar Borgstrøm, composer and music critic (born 1864).

November

- 26 – Johannes Haarklou, composer, organist, conductor, and music critic (born 1847).

== Births ==
January

- 1 – Kurt Foss, composer, singer and vaudeville artist (died 1991).

February

- 20 – Hans-Jørgen Holman, musicologist and educationalist (died 1986).

April

- 14 – Ingebrigt Davik, teacher, children's writer, broadcasting personality, singer and songwriter (died 1991).

May

- 4 – Harry W. Kvebæk, classical trumpeter and academic (died 2012).

June

- 19 – Arnstein Johansen, accordionist (died 2013).

== See also ==
- 1925 in Norway
- Music of Norway
