= 1897 in Norwegian music =

The following is a list of notable events and releases of the year 1897 in Norwegian music.

== Births ==
April

- 17 – Harald Sæverud, organist, composer, and conductor (died 1992).

== See also ==
- 1897 in Norway
- Music of Norway
