= Lukas Zabulionis =

Norwegian saxophonist and composer

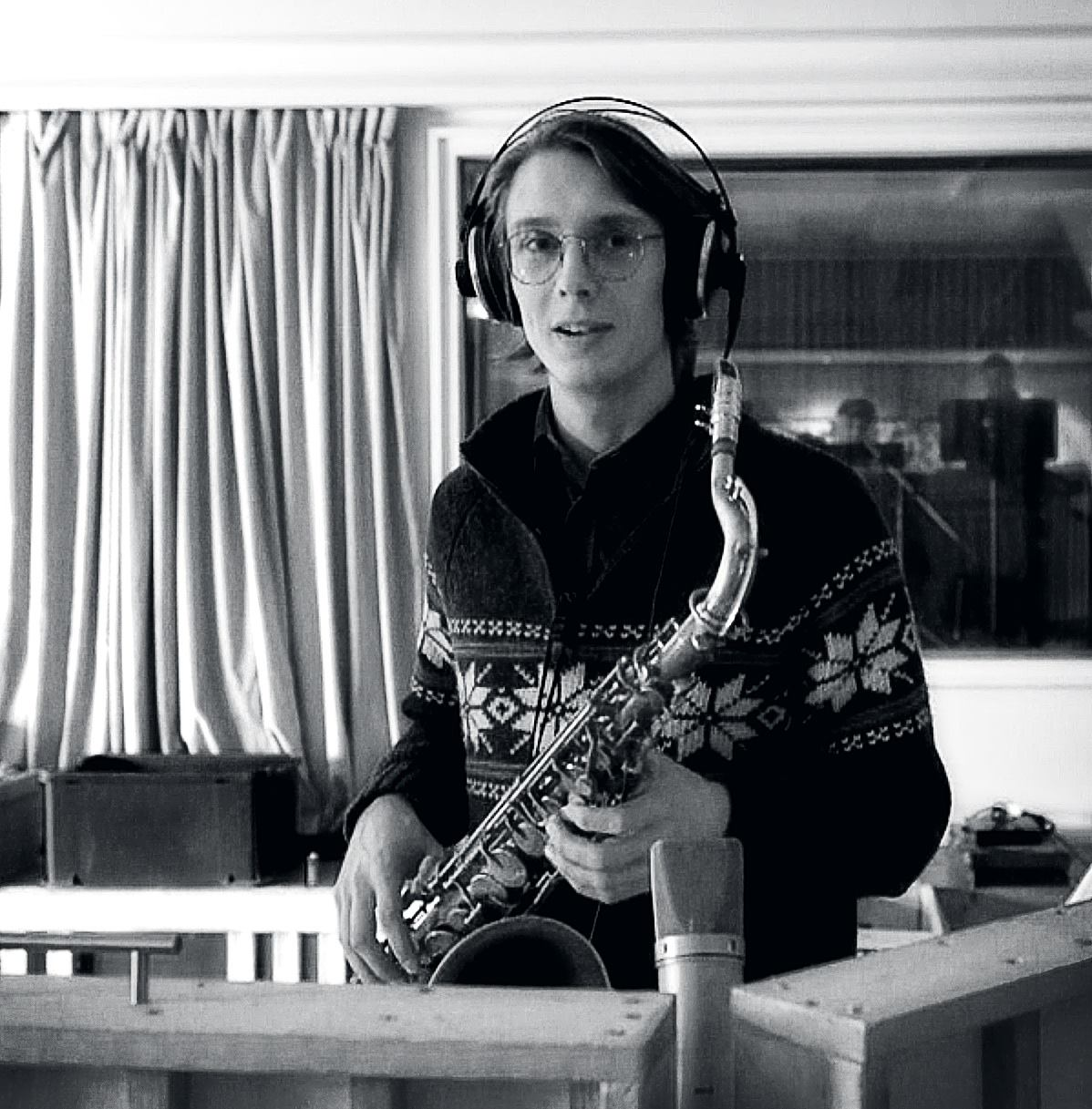
- Lukas Zabulionis, recording "Changing Tides"

Background information
- Born: 6 March 1992 (age 34); Lithuania
- Genre: Jazz
- Occupation: Musician
- Instrument: Saxophone
- Label: Curling Legs
- Website: www.lukaszabulionis.com

Lukas Zabulionis (born 6 March 1992 in Lithuania) is a Norwegian saxophonist and composer of Lithuanian origin, residing in Sandefjord Municipality, Norway.

== Biography ==
Zabulionis has lived in Sandefjord since he was 7 years old. After graduation at Sandefjord high school, he attended musical studies at Toneheim Folk High School in 2011. He graduated with a bachelor's degree in jazz performance in 2016 on the Jazzl program, the department of Jazz at Norwegian University of Science and Technology in Trondheim (NTNU).

Zabulionis received attention for his debut album Changing Tides (2016). Additional musicians are Ivan Blomqvist (piano), Arne Martin Nybo (guitar), Kristian B. Jacobsen (bass), and Per Kamfjord (drums). The music is inspired by ECM's contemporary jazz aesthetics from the 1970s and are linked to the work of Jan Garbarek. The thinking behind the release can also be linked to ideas that originated in the romanticism in the 1800s, where the music is marked by longing, mystery and love with great emphasis on colors and contrasts.

== Discography ==
- 2016: Changing Tides (Curling Legs)
