= 1908 in Norwegian music =

The following is a list of notable events and releases of the year 1908 in Norwegian music.

== Births ==
June

- 30 – Paul Okkenhaug, composer and organist (died 1975).

August

- 31 – Conrad Baden, organist, composer, music educator, and music critic (died 1989).

October

- 19 – Geirr Tveitt, composer and pianist (died 1981).

== See also ==
- 1908 in Norway
- Music of Norway
