= Irmgard Österwall =

Swedish singer

Irmgard Österwall (18 August 1914 – 31 December 1980) was a Swedish singer.

Österwall began singing in amateur societies and debuted as a singer in Gosta Jonsson's orchestra. She debuted as a soloist in 1941 and in the early 1940s sang with her brother Seymour Österwall's orchestra. She is considered one of Sweden's first jazz singers and was sometimes called "Red Hot Mama."

In the early 1950s, she retired as a singer after marrying the painter Tore Catoni.

== Discography ==
- Oh! Mother (Luna mezzo mare), with Leon Liljequist and Arena Orchestra
- A good man all week, with Seymour Orchestra
- I've loved you so long as I can remember, with Einar Groth orchestra
- Lamberth Walk, with the Scala orchestra
- Oh, mia bella Napoli Ami, with Helge Mauritz and Scala orchestra
- Star Grandeur, with Thore Ehrlings orchestra
- Above the rainbow, with Thore Ehrlings orchestra
