= 1975 in Norwegian music =

The following is a list of notable events and releases of the year 1975 in Norwegian music.

== Events ==
=== March ===
- 21 – The 2nd Vossajazz started in Vossavangen, Norway (March 21 – 23).

=== May ===
- 21
  - The 23rd Bergen International Festival started in Bergen, Norway (May 21 – June 4).
  - The 3rd Nattjazz started in Bergen, Norway (May 21 – June 4).

=== June ===
- 22 – The 6th Kalvøyafestivalen started at Kalvøya near by Oslo.

== Albums released ==
=== Unknown date ===
A

Arild Andersen

- Clouds in My Head (ECM Records).

B

Odd Børretzen

- Odd Børretzen (Camp Records)

E

Jan Eggum

- Jan Eggum (CBS Records)

K

Karin Krog

- Jazz Jamboree 75 Vol. 2 (Polydor Records) with Zbigniew Namysłowski Quintet.

N

Lillebjørn Nilsen

- Byen Med Det Store Hjertet (Polydor Records)

P

Popol Ace

- Stolen From Time (Polydor Records)

R

Inger Lise Rypdal

- Feeling (Talent Records)

Terje Rypdal

- Odyssey (ECM Records).

S

Torgrim Sollid

- Østerdalsmusikk (Plateselskapet MAI)

Øystein Sunde

- Hurtbuller I Hvit Saus (Philips Records)

== Deaths ==
August

- 24 – Brita Bratland, traditional folk singer (born 1910).

November

- 30 – Paul Okkenhaug, composer and organist (born 1908).

== Births ==
January

- 13 – Rune Eriksen, black metal guitarist and composer, Mayhem.

March

- 4 – Mats Eilertsen, jazz upright bassist and composer.
- 9 – Øyvind Storesund, rock and jazz upright bassist, Cloroform and Kaizers Orchestra.
- 10 – Håvard Wiik, jazz pianist and composer, Atomic.
- 18 – Sondre Meisfjord, jazz bassist and cellist, and composer.
- 22 – Steinar Raknes, jazz upright bassist and composer.

April

- 9 – Bertine Zetlitz, pop singer.
- 12 – Lars Andreas Haug, jazz tubist and composer.
- 14 – Øystein Brun, black metal guitarist, Borknagar.
- 23
  - Helge Lien, jazz pianist, composer and band leader.
  - Rolf-Erik Nystrøm, saxophonist and composer.

May

- 1 – Aslak Hartberg, rapper and bass player.
- 2 – Alexander Stenerud, singer/songwriter.
- 15 – Frode Haltli, accordion player
- 19 – Geir Zahl, rock guitarist, Kaizers Orchestra.
- 20 – Bjarte Ludvigsen, drummer and record producer.
- 31 – Kjetil Nordhus, singer, composer, Green Carnation.

June

- 2 – Gisle Torvik, jazz guitarist and composer.
- 16 – Jannike Kruse, singer, artist and actor.

July

- 22 – Erik Johannessen, trombonist and composer.
- 28 – John Erik Kaada, singer-songwriter, producer and multi-instrumentalist.

August

- 1 – Håkon Mjåset Johansen, jazz drummer and composer.
- 2 – Lars Petter Hagen, contemporary composer and director of the Ultima Oslo Contemporary Music Festival.
- 7 – Kristian Eivind "Gaahl" Espedal, black metal vocalist and artist, God Seed, Wardruna, and Gaahls Wyrd).
- 12 – Robert Burås, vocalist, guitarist and songwriter, Madrugada and My Midnight Creeps, (died 2007).
- 27 – Janove Ottesen, rock vocalist, guitarist, and playing on barrels, Kaizers Orchestra.

September

- 15 – Andy LaPlegua, lead vocalist (Icon of Coil).
- 16 – Thomas "Pest" Kronenes, black metal vocalist (Gorgoroth).
- 26 – Håvard Jørgensen, songwriter, guitarist and vocalist (Satyricon and Ulver).

October

- 2 – Kåre Opheim, drummer (Real Ones).
- 10 – Vegard Sverre Tveitan, black metal vocalist, multi-instrumentalist, and composer (Emperor).
- 12
  - Espen Aalberg, jazz drummer.
  - Marianne Beate Kielland, Norwegian mezzo-soprano.
- 25 – Eirik Glambek Bøe, musician, writer and vocalist (Kings of Convenience).
- 26 – Ole Marius Sandberg, jazz upright bassist.
- 27 – Kate Havnevik, film score composer, songwriter and singer.

November

- 12 – Simen Eriksrud, songwriter and record producer.
- 20
  - Lars K. Hustoft, songwriter, record producer and artist manager.
  - Sigurd Wongraven, black metal vocalist, guitarist, bassist, and keyboardist (Satyricon).
- 21 – Erlend Øye, composer, musician, producer, singer and songwriter.
- 27 – Frode Nymo, jazz saxophonist.

Unknown date

- Ernst Simon Glaser, cellist and music teacher.
- Kolbjørn Lyslo, DJ, musician, and music producer.

== See also ==
- 1975 in Norway
- Music of Norway
- Norway in the Eurovision Song Contest 1975
