= Storhove =

Neighborhood in Lillehammer, Norway

Coordinates: 61°08′56″N 10°25′27″E

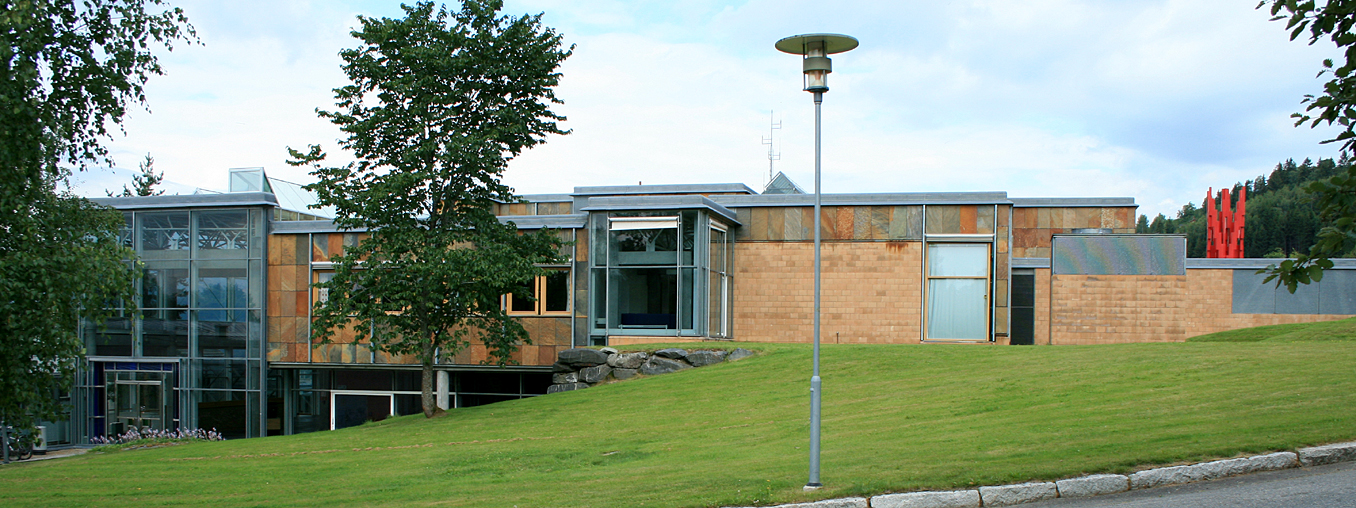
Inland Norway University

Storhove is a neighborhood of Lillehammer, Norway, located 5 kilometers (3 mi) north of the city center. It is the location of a Inland Norway University site, and the Lillehammer offices of the Norwegian Broadcasting Corporation. During the 1994 Winter Olympics, it also hosted the International Broadcasting Center and the Main Press Center.
