= Arthur Österwall =

Swedish composer

Arthur Österwall (Sven Artur Österwall, 6 March 1910 – 27 February 1990) was a Swedish band leader, composer, vocalist and musician (double bass).

Österwall was born and died in Stockholm, and first appeared in his brother Seymour Österwall's orchestra, but in 1944 formed his own orchestra. He was also a jazz columnist and entertainment reporter.

== Discography ==
- 1942: I gult och blått (The yellow and blue)
- 1941: Hem från Babylon (Home from Babylon)

== Filmography ==
- 1983: Åke Hasselgård Story (Ake Hazel Farm Story)
- 1943: Flickan är ett fynd (The girl is a bargain)
- 1941: Gatans serenad (Street Serenade)
