= 1981 in Norwegian music =

The following is a list of notable events and releases of the year 1981 in Norwegian music.

== Events ==
=== April ===
- 10 – The 8th Vossajazz started in Vossavangen, Norway (April 10 – 12).

=== May ===
- 20 – 9th Nattjazz started in Bergen, Norway (May 20 – June 3).

== Albums released ==
=== Unknown date ===
A

The Aller Værste!

- Disniland I De Tusen Hjem (Den Gode Hensikt)

G

Jan Garbarek

- Folk Songs (ECM Records), with Charlie Haden, and Egberto Gismonti
- Eventyr (ECM Records), with Nana Vasconcelos, Palle Danielsson, and John Abercrombie
- Nude Ants (ECM Records), with Keith Jarrett, Palle Danielsson, and Jon Christensen

K

Karin Krog

- I Remember You (Spotlite Records)

R

Terje Rypdal

- To Be Continued (ECM Records)

S

Thorgeir Stubø

- Notice (ECM Records)

Øystein Sunde

- Barkebille Boogie (Philips Records)

V

Jan Erik Vold

- Stein. Regn (PolyGram Records), with Kåre Virud and Telemark Blueslag

== Deaths ==
February

- 1 – Geirr Tveitt, composer and pianist (born 1908).

May

- 22 – Reimar Riefling, classical pianist, music teacher, and music critic (born 1898).

== Births ==
February

- 2 – Julian Berntzen, vocalist, pianist, violinist and composer.

March

- 18 – Ingrid Olava, singer, pianist, and songwriter.
- 25 – Cato Sundberg, vocalist, guitarist, and songwriter, Donkeyboy.

April

- 7 – Amund Maarud, blues and rock guitarist.
- 27 – Hilde Marie Kjersem, singer and songwriter.

June

- 16 – Ola Kvernberg, jazz violinist and composer.

July

- 13 – Sigurd Hole, jazz upright bassist, Eple Trio.
- 28 – Lars Fredrik Frøislie, vocalist, keyboardist and drummer.
- 29 – Gjermund Larsen, traditional folk music violinist and composer.

August

- 3 – Erlend Tvinnereim, operatic tenor.

October

- 24
  - Fredrik Mikkelsen, jazz guitarist.
  - Lucy Swann, English musician, vocalist, and composer, living in Norway.
- 26 – Erlend Slettevoll, jazz pianist and keyboarder.
- 28 – Andreas Loven, jazz pianist.
- 29 – Lene Alexandra, singer and model.

November

December

- 17 – Kim Myhr, jazz guitarist.
- 20 – John Olav Nilsen, vocalist and songwriter, John Olav Nilsen & Gjengen.
- 24 – Solveig Heilo, composer and percussionist, Katzenjammer.

Unknown date

- Ivar Loe Bjørnstad, jazz and rock drummer.
- Todd Terje, DJ, songwriter, and record producer.

== See also ==
- 1981 in Norway
- Music of Norway
- Norway in the Eurovision Song Contest 1981
