= Lillehammer Olympic Village =

Coordinates: 61°08′09″N 10°28′12″E

Lillehammer Olympic Village (Norwegian: Lillehammer OL-landsby) was a village constructed in Lillehammer, Norway, to accommodate 2,300 athletes and leaders during the 1994 Winter Olympics, and subsequently a smaller number during the 1994 Winter Paralympics. The Hamar Olympic Subsite Village was in Hamar; part of Toneheim Folk High School, it was able to accommodate 500 athletes and leaders.

== Lillehammer ==
The Lillehammer Olympic Village was built at Skårsetlia, 3 kilometers (1.9 mi) northeast of the town center of Lillehammer. It was built on a 230 hectares (570 acres) property and had 55,000 square meters (590,000 sq ft) of real estate. This gave a capacity for 2,300 athletes and leaders from 67 nations. In addition, there was a 7,000-square-meter (75,000 sq ft) service center, including a 2,000-square-meter (22,000 sq ft) cafeteria which could serve 2,000 people simultaneously. There were security posts at the entrance to the village, with bus stops, parking and a reception further in. Heating was provided by electricity, solar power, gas and geothermal heat.

Each team was allocated a common area after the size of the team. Common rooms varied from 38 to 288 square meters (410 to 3,100 sq ft), all teams received a main leader room of 12 square meters (130 sq ft), between one and three additional 8-square-meter (86 sq ft) leader rooms, between one and three 13-square-meter (140 sq ft) medical rooms, between one and four 18-square-meter (190 sq ft) massage rooms, a storage room between 20 and 50 square meters (220 and 540 sq ft), and a drying room between 10 and 64 square meters (110 and 690 sq ft).

Construction started in 1992 and the first house was completed on 10 August. Average production per day was 250 square meters (2,700 sq ft); to get sufficient speed, several contractors with different prefabrication methods were selected. The village, consisting of wooden buildings, including parts in glue-laminated wood, was completed in December 1993 costing 250 million Norwegian krone (NOK). However, the reception building was made of aluminum modules, allowing it to be moved afterwards. During the games, it was rented by the Lillehammer Olympic Organizing Committee. The village consisted of a permanent part of 185 houses; of which 141 were sold privately after the games. Re-building and dismounting started in April 1994. The service center was afterwards converted to a cafeteria, senior center, a church and a nursery school. The rest of the buildings were mobile and sold to other parts of the country after the games. The temporary part was built on farmland which was taken into use as such from 1996.

== Hamar ==
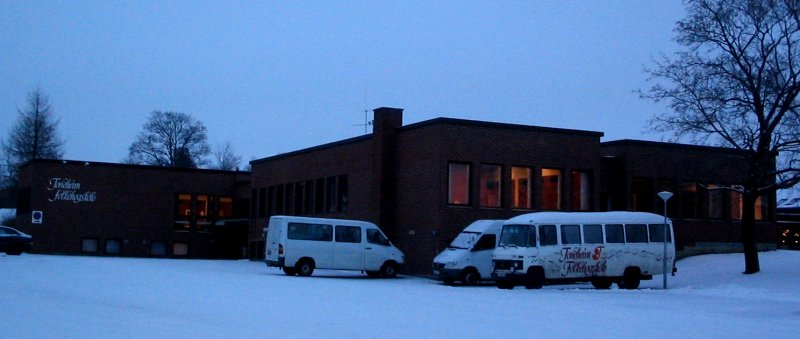
Toneheim Folk High School was used for the Hamar Olympic Subsite Village

The Hamar Olympic Subsite Village was located at Toneheim Folk High School in Hamar, 3 kilometers (1.9 mi) from Vikingskipet. In addition to the schools dormitory, the surrounding land was used to construct temporary estate. Total floor area was 6,450 square meters (69,400 sq ft), which allowed for 500 athletes and leaders. The Hamar site was used for athletes competing in Hamar, which consisted of speed skating, short track speed skating and figure skating.
