= The Commander-In-Chief =

- Born: Berit Hagen; 1989 (age 36–37); Bergen, Norway
- Genres: Metal, pop, classical-crossover
- Occupations: Guitarist, singer, songwriter, writer, illustrator
- Instruments: Guitar, piano, vocals
- Years active: 2008 - Present
- Label: Commander Records
- Website: virtuosomusicgroup.com

The Commander-In-Chief (born Berit Hagen in 1989) is a Norwegian guitarist and singer. She plays metal-pop / classical-crossover.

== Biography ==
Berit Hagen was born in Bergen, Norway, in 1989. She has lived in several countries, including Italy, Norway, France and the United States. She speaks several languages fluently, including Norwegian, English, Italian, and French. When she lived in Chicago she took lessons in visual art with the established artist Linda Cohn. She started playing the guitar in 2005, at the age of 16.

Her international childhood, moving abroad at the age of six, growing up in Verona (Italy) for all of her elementary school years, then moving to Vence (France), Merritt Island (Florida), Chicago and Los Angeles.

== Critical reception ==
Metal Hammer magazine called her "The Queen of Shred" and has proclaimed her one of the world's ten most exciting metal guitarists. Ron "Bumblefoot" Thal in Guns N' Roses has said about her that "She is a great talent with proper metal spirit..

Total Guitar magazine said, "It's a sad fact that when you think of shred guitarists, the majority of them will be men. Enter The Commander-In-Chief, a seven-string wielding uber shredding female who's ready to melt faces and shatter stereotypes. This Norwegian Metal maiden has her eyes set to command and conquer the masses."

Her historic guitar recording and video together with Thomas Valeur of the composer Pablo de Sarasate "Zigeunerweisen Op. 20", never before recorded or played on guitar has received a lot of attention.

== Equipment ==
She is an official Ibanez guitar artist. She has been using the Ibanez RG7620, but is currently playing the Ibanez S5527 Prestige guitar. She is, however, best known for playing the prototype Ibanez Falchion 7 string guitar, the only instrument of its kind in the world. She uses Laney Amps, EMG pickups, Audix microphones, DR Strings, Levy´s Leathers, PreSonus, and Stonecastle equipment.

== Trademarks ==
- When performing, she is always dressed in a uniform, reflecting her chosen artist name, "The Commander-In-Chief."
- Her prototype Ibanez Falchion 7 string guitar

== Releases ==
- Demo: "Battle For The Mind" & "If The Dead Ones Could Talk" - (2008)
- Demo: State of The Union - (2009)
- Demo: Battle For The Mind - (2010)
- Single: Paranoid - (2011)
- EP: Evolution - (2012)
- Single: Dropout - (2013)
- Single: I Am The Commander In Chief - (2013)
- Single: The Commander-in-chief feat. Thomas Valeur: Sarasate "Zigeunerweisen Op. 20" - (2013)
- Album: The Commander-in-chief & Craig Ogden: 2 Guitars - The Classical Crossover Album - (2014)
- Single: Om Jeg Aldri Ser Deg Igjen (Live) (2015)
- Album: I Am (2016)
- Single: How Cheap Will You Sell Your Soul? - (2018)
- Single: Stay With Me - (2018)
- Single: Why So Hostile? - (2018)
- Album: Berit, Vol. 1 (2018)
- Album: The Virtuoso (2020)
- Single: Non Si Sa Mai - (2020)
- Single: The Manager - (2020)
- Album: Berit, Vol. 2 (2020)
- Single: Nordic Barbarian - (2021)
- Album: Berit, Vol. 3 (2021)
- Album: Berit, Vol. 4 (2022)

== Other work ==
She is also the author and illustrator of the children's book, "The Freezing Snowman," which is her first book.

Author of the book "How To: Survive As A Musician In The Digital Age"

Created a series of online courses with her manager Elisabeth. Some of her personal courses are:

- Guitar Masterclass
- Guitar Rehab

== Awards ==
- Nominated for "Best Metal Song 2011" by Hollywood Music In Media Awards.
- Nominated for "Best Metal Song 2012" by Hollywood Music In Media Awards.
