= Seven Songs, Op. 17 (Sibelius) =

Collection of art songs by Jean Sibelius (1891–1904)

- Song collection by Jean Sibelius
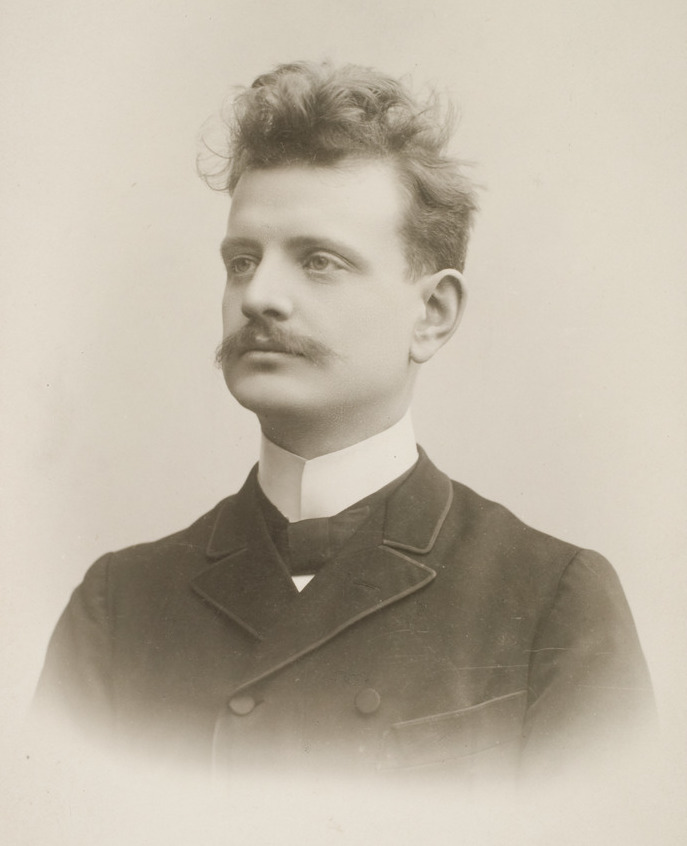
- The composer (c. 1895)
- Opus: 17
- Language: Swedish (Nos. 1–5); Finnish (Nos. 6–7)
- Composed: 1891–1904; No. 1 orch. 1903

External audio
- Sung by Anne Sofie von Otter, accompanied by Bengt Forsberg
- No. 1, "Se'n har jag ej frågat mera"
- No. 2, "Sov in!"
- No. 3, "Fågellek"
- No. 4, "Vilse"
- No. 5, "En slända"
- No. 6, "Illalle"
- No. 7, "Lastu lainehilla"

The Seven Songs, Op. 17, (Note: Because Sibelius's Op. 17 songs are sung in Swedish and Finnish, this article gives preference to each song's native title, rather than the English translation.) is a collection of five Swedish-language and two Finnish-language art songs for vocal soloist and piano written from 1891 to 1904 by the Finnish composer Jean Sibelius. (Note: All but a few of Sibelius's songs are settings of Swedish-language poems (quantitatively, his favorite poets were Ernst Josephson, Johan Ludvig Runeberg, Viktor Rydberg, and Karl August Tavaststjerna) and are with piano accompaniment. While many are of high quality, they largely have been neglected outside the Nordic realm, due to the limited coverage (in terms of number of speakers) of Swedish (relative to, for example, German or French).)

== Constituent songs ==
Ordered by catalogue number, the Op. 17 songs are as follows:

- "Se'n har jag ej frågat mera" ("Since Then I Have Questioned No Further"), Op. 17/1 (1891–92); text by the Finnish poet Johan Ludvig Runeberg
- "Sov in!" ("Go to Sleep!"), Op. 17/2 (1891–92); text by the Finnish poet Karl August Tavaststjerna
- "Fågellek" ("Play of the Birds"), Op. 17/3 (1891); text by Tavaststjerna
- "Vilse" ("Astray"), Op. 17/4 (1898, revised 1902); text by Tavaststjerna
- "En slända" ("A Dragonfly"), Op. 17/5 (1904); text by the Swedish poet Oscar Levertin
- "Illalle" ("To Evening"), Op. 17/6 (1898); text by the Finnish poet August Valdemar Koskimies (né Forsman)
- "Lastu lainehilla" ("Driftwood"), Op. 17/7 (1902); text by the Finnish poet Ilmari Kianto (né Calamnius)

=== Orchestral version of No. 1 ===
In 1903, Sibelius arranged "Se'n har jag ej frågat mera" for vocalist and orchestra.

== Notes, references, and sources ==
=== Sources ===
- Barnett, Andrew (2007). Sibelius. New Haven, Connecticut: Yale University Press. ISBN 978-0-300-16397-1.
- Dahlström, Fabian [in Swedish] (2003). Jean Sibelius: Thematisch-bibliographisches Verzeichnis seiner Werke [Jean Sibelius: A Thematic Bibliographic Index of His Works] (in German). Wiesbaden: Breitkopf & Härtel. ISBN 3-7651-0333-0.
- Layton, Robert (1993) [1965]. Sibelius. (The Master Musicians Series) (4th ed.). New York: Schirmer Books. ISBN 0028713222.
