= Miss Tati =

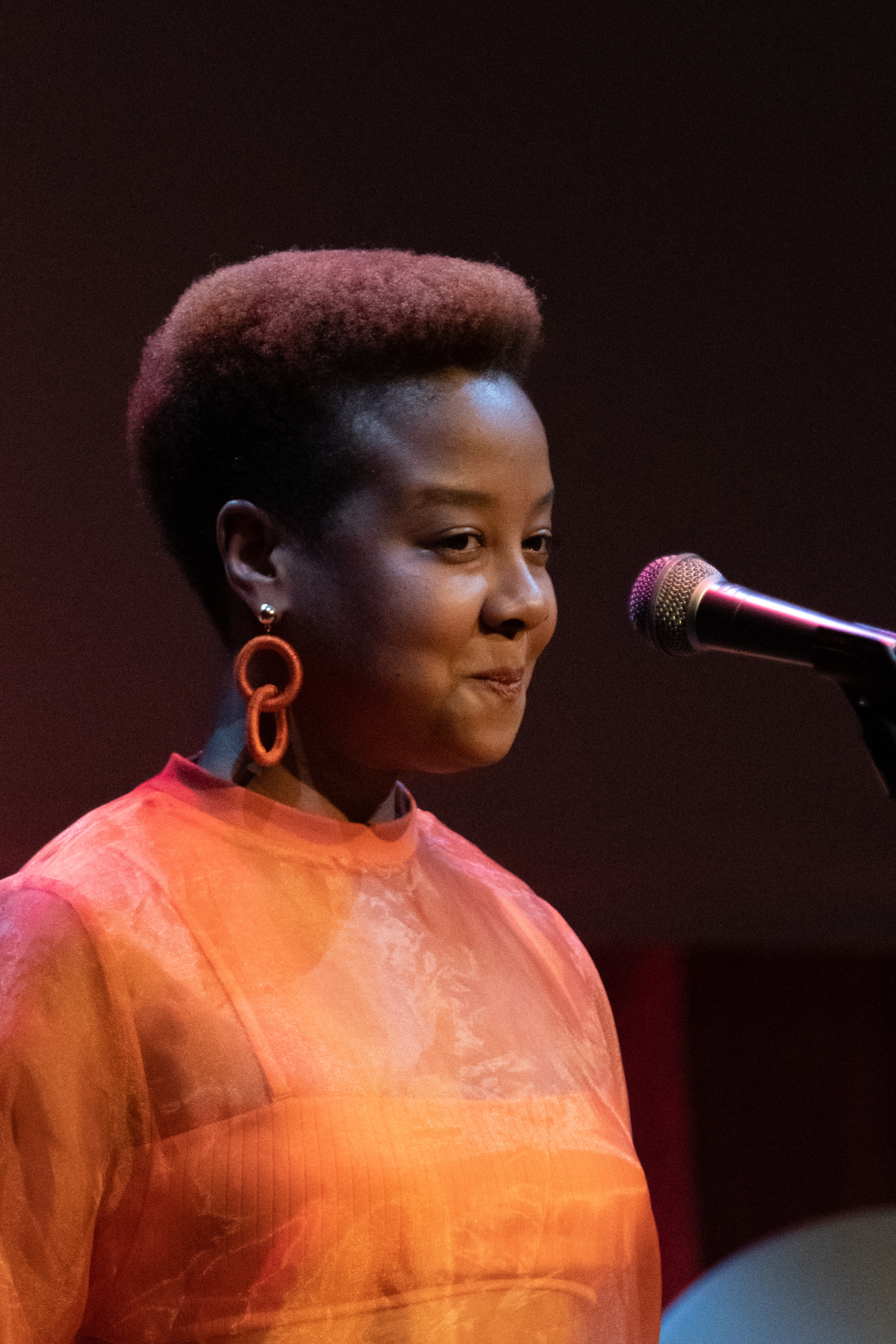

Background information
- Also known as: Miss Tati
- Born: Tatiana De Fatima Palanca Lopes Pereira; October 13, 1986 (age 39); Setúbal, Portugal
- Origin: Angolan
- Genres: Soul, R&B
- Occupations: Singer, songwriter
- Instrument: Vocals
- Years active: 2009
- Labels: Chilenwa Records, Caroline International (Universal Norway), Tellé Records
- Website: www.misstati.com

Tatiana De Fatima Palanca Lopes Pereira, (born October 13, 1986), known professionally as Miss Tati, is a Norwegian singer. She released 3 singles in 2015, followed by a solo album in 2017.

== Biography ==
Born in Portugal to Angolan parents in 1986, the soul and R&B singer grew up in the city of Setúbal before moving to Bergen in Norway. In 2015, she gained international and national recognition. Her single, “Don’t Let Go”, got attention from Okayafrica, The Guardian playlist, and a shout out from former BBC Radio 1 host Rob da Bank. In 2019, she performed at festivals like Nattjazz, Bergenfest, Øyafestivalen and Oslo World Music Festival in Oslo.

== Discography ==
=== Singles ===
- 2015: Don't Let Go Single
- 2015: Shakedown Single
- 2015: Be Free Single

=== Solo album ===
- 2017: Finally Miss Tati
