= Espen Wensaas =

- Born: 14 November 1986 (age 39); Ringerike, Norway
- Origin: Geilo
- Genres: Folk music, jazz, musical improvisation
- Occupation: Musician
- Instruments: Mandolin, cittern, acoustic guitar, electric guitar, tin whistle, bukkehorn, piano
- Years active: 2008–present
- Website: www.EspenWensaas.com

Espen Wensaas (born 14 November 1986) is a Norwegian musician and multi-instrumentalist (most notably mandolin, cittern and guitar) residing in Oslo, Norway. He is mostly known for performing Norwegian and Scandinavian folk music on guitar and modern cittern.

== Education ==
Wensaas started his musical education at Toneheim Folk High School in 2004, where he studied classical guitar and other music related subjects. Later on he continued his classical training in Ringerike High School in Hønefoss. After high school Wensaas moved to Stavanger in 2009 to study jazz guitar at the University of Stavanger. He moved to Oslo in 2010 and was admitted to a bachelor's degree in musical performance at the Norwegian Academy of Music in Oslo. He graduated from the academy in 2015, also receiving the highest grade possible on his final exam concert. In 2018 he became the first student admitted to the masters program in the folk department at the same academy with guitar and cittern as the main instruments. He finished his master's degree in 2020.

== Professional career ==
Wensaas has worked as a freelance musician since 2008. He has gone on tours and played many concerts and performances with several different groups and projects. Amongst his collaborations are Åse Kleveland, Stian Carstensen, Steinar Ofsdal, Unni Løvlid, Aslak Brimi, Bjørn Kåre Odde, Jelena Tomasevic, Silje Nergaard, Elin Kåven, Carl Morten Iversen, FRIKAR, KORK, Tore Bruvoll, Emil Solli Tangen and Ståle Ytterli.
