= Lars Ove Fossheim =

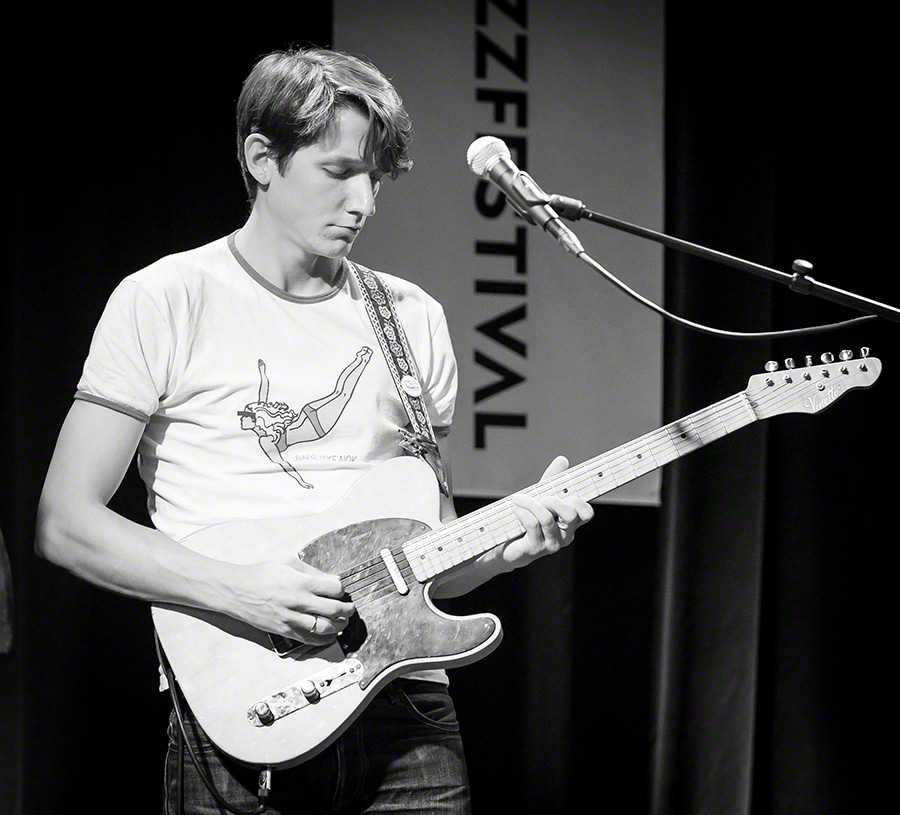
- Fossheim at Oslo Jazzfestival 2016.

Background information
- Born: Lars Ove Stene Fossheim; 1986 (age 39–40); Nordfjordeid, Norway
- Genres: Jazz, rock, Free improvisation
- Occupations: Musician, composer
- Instrument: Guitar
- Labels: Grappa Music, Riot Factory, Bella Union

Lars Ove Stene Fossheim (born 1986 in Nordfjordeid, Norway) is a Norwegian jazz guitarist from Volda Municipality, known from bands like Broen, Skadedyr, Snøskred, Trondheim Jazz Orchestra, Your Headlights Are On.

== Career ==
Fossheim studied Musicology at the University of Oslo from 2007 - 2009, and then went on to study Jazz guitar at the NTNU Jazz Concervatory in Trondheim from 2009 - 2013. From 2016 - 2017, Fossheim taught jazz music at the Sund Folk High School. As a performing musician, he is grounded in different musical traditions such as jazz, experimental music and rock. He has played with various contemporary musicians and composers such as Christian Wolff, Pauline Oliveros, Rhys Chatham, Michael Francis Duch, Jennifer Walshe, and is playing in bands like Broen, Skadedyr, Stina Stjern, Snøskred, Trondheim Jazz Orchestra, Your Headlights Are On.

== Discography ==
With 'Your Headlights Are On'

- 2011: Your Headlights Are On (Dayladore Collective)

With 'Snøskred'

- 2012: Whiteout (Riot Factory, Sad Songs For Happy People)
- 2016: Empty House (Riot Factory)

With 'Skadedyr'

- 2013: Kongekrabbe (Hubro)
- 2016: Culturen (Hubro)

With Trondheim Jazz Orchestra and Christian Wallumrød

- 2015: Untitled Arpeggios And Pulses (Hubro)

With 'Broen'

- 2015: Yoga (Nabovarsel)
