= Toneheim Folk High School =

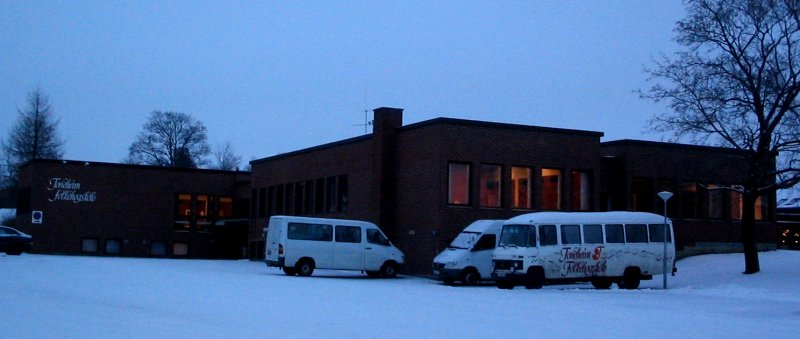

Location
- Hamar; Norway
- Coordinates: 60°48′07″N 11°08′21″E

Information
- Campus: Rural

Toneheim Folk High School (Norwegian: Toneheim folkehøgskole) is a folk high school which focuses on music. It is located in Hamar, Norway.

During the 1994 Winter Olympics, it was part of the Hamar Olympic Subsite Village.

== Alumni ==
- 1973-74: Hans Fredrik Jacobsen, musician (Risør)
- 1974-75: Jan Kåre Hystad, musician (Stord)
- 1975-76: Geir Løvold, musician
- 1976-77: Tone Hulbækmo, musician (Tolga)
- 1976-77: Hege Schøyen, artist (Oslo)
- 1976-78: Olav Dale, saxophone (Vossevangen)
- 1977-78: Bjørn Klakegg, guitarist (Skien)
- 1979-80: Vilde Bjerke, actor and artist
- 1979-80: Eldar Vågan, artist
- 1979-80: Ole Jacob Hystad, musician
- 1979-80: Nils Petter Molvær, trumpeter (Langevåg)
- 1979-80: Tore Brunborg, saxophonist (Trondheim)
- 1980-81: Magne Fremmerlid, vocals
- 1982-84: Ragnar Rasmussen, organist
- 1982-83: Per Arne Glorvigen, musician (Dovre)
- 1983-84: Harald Devold, saxophonist (Vadsø)
- 1983-84: Kåre Kolve, saxophonist (Voss)
- 1984-85: Geir Lysne, musician (Trondheim)
- 1984-85: Helge Sunde, musician (Stryn)
- 1985-86: Ragnar Rasmussen, choir director
- 1985-86: Jarle Vespestad, drummer (Jessheim)
- 1985-86: Hildegunn Øiseth, vocals (Kongsvinger)
- 1986-87: Petter Wettre, saxophonist (Sandefjord)
- 1988-89: David Gald, musician (Stryn)
- 1988-89: Susanne Lundeng, fiddler (Bodø)
- 1988-89: Per Mathisen, double bassist (Sandefjord)
- 1990-91: Rein Alexander Hauge Korshamn, artist (Bergen)
- 1992-93: Maja Ratkje, musician (Trondheim)
- 1993-94: Hild Sofie Tafjord, musician (Langevåg)
- 1993-94: Kåre Nymark, musician (Langevåg)
- 1993-94: Kaia Huuse, musician (Hedmark)
- 1993-94: Line Horntveth, musician (Tønsberg)
- 1994-95: John Erik Kaada, musician
- 1995-96: Unni Løvlid, musician (Hornindal)
- 1995-96: Jon Øystein Flink, author (Fredrikstad)
- 1996-97: Ole Jørn Myklebust, musician (Eidsdal)
- 1997-98: Morten Qvenild, pianist (Kongsberg)
- 1998-99: Mathias Eick, trumpeter (Eidsfoss)
- 1998-99: Tora Augestad, actor and artist (Bergen)
- 1999-00: Erlend Bratlie, saxophone (Stavanger)
- 2000-01: Erlend Tvinnereim, vocals (Bergen)
- 2000-01: Ingrid Vetlesen, vocals (Oslo)
- 2004-05: Espen Wensaas, mandolinist and guitarist (Geilo)
- 2006-07: Harald Lassen, saxophonist (Greipstad)
- 2006-07: Christian Meaas Svendsen, bassist (Kongsberg)
- 2008-09: Elisabeth Wulfsberg, vocalist
- 2009-10: Karoline Kalleberg, alto vocalist (Oslo)
- 2009-10: Astrid Nordstad, Mezzo-soprano (Trondheim)
- 2009-10: Stefi Martine Ringen, vocalist (Oppegård)
- 2009-10: Per Myrstad Kringen, pianist (Kristiansand)
- 2011-12: Lukas Zabulionis, saxophonist (Sandefjord)
- 2012-13: Rohey Taalah, vocals (Oslo)
