= Eugen Malmstén =

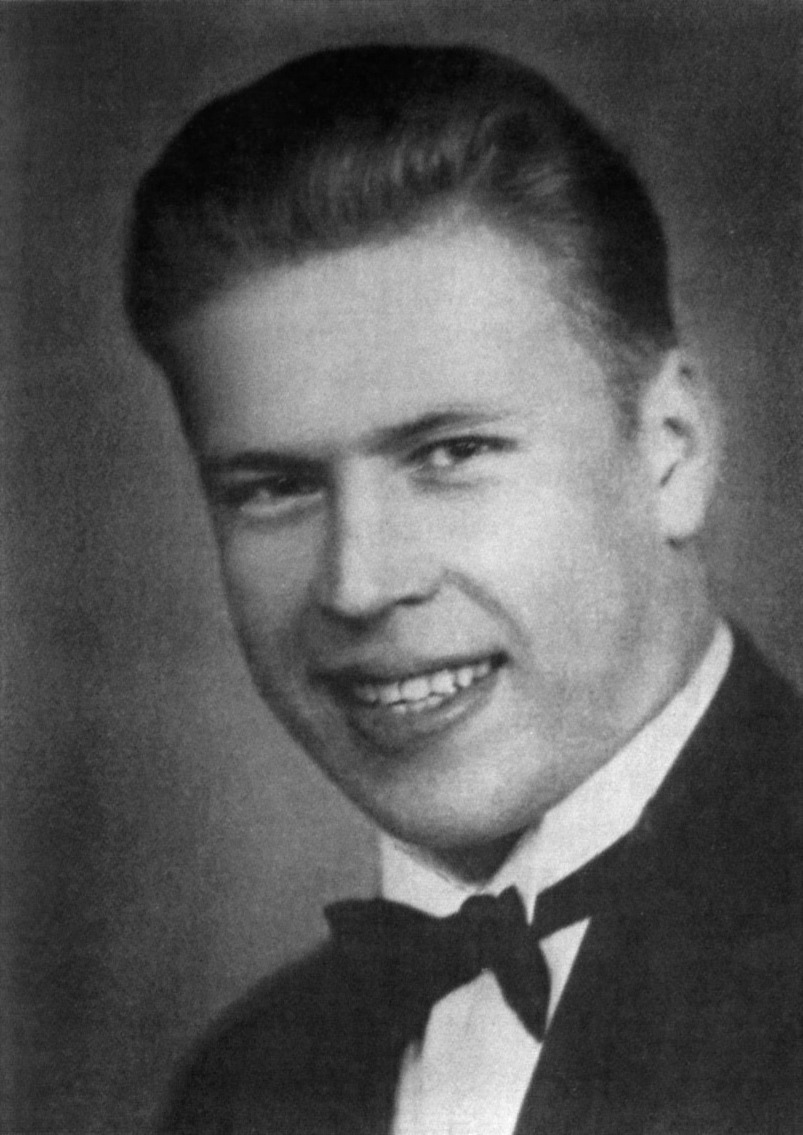

Background information
- Born: 16 February 1907; Helsinki
- Died: 1 September 1993 (aged 86) Helsinki
- Occupations: singer, musician, composer, orchestra conductor, lyricist

Eugen Malmstén (16 February 1907 – 1 September 1993) was a Finnish musician, singer, orchestra conductor, composer, lyricist and actor. He was born and died in Helsinki. He was the brother of Georg Malmstén, and was of Russian descent through his mother, Eugenie Petroff.
