= Rohey Taalah =

Norwegian soul and jazz singer (born 1993)

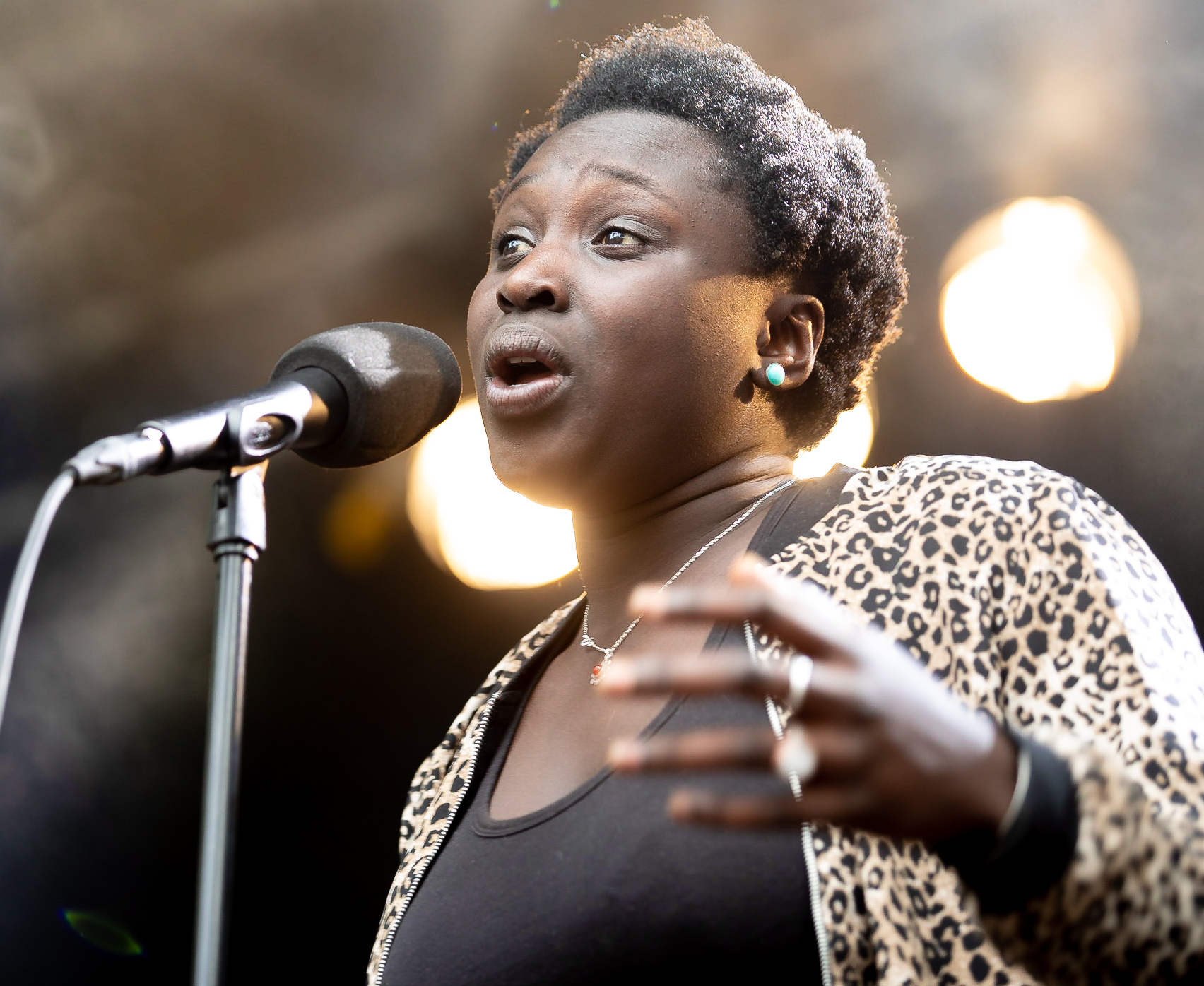
- Rohey Taalah performing with GURLS in 2018

Background information
- Born: 1993 (age 32–33); Oslo, Norway
- Genre: Jazz
- Occupation: Singer
- Instrument: Vocals
- Label: Jazzland Recordings
- Formerly of: Rohey
- Website: rohey.no

Rohey Taalah (born 1993 in Oslo, Norway) is a Norwegian soul and jazz singer.

== Biography ==
Taalah studied music at Toneheim Folk High School (2012–13), before attending the jazz program at the Norwegian University of Science and Technology (2013–16). She was a member of the Norwegian future soul quartet Rohey. They have toured extensively throughout Norway and Scandinavia, visiting most festivals and venues on the road. Rohey released their debut album A Million Things in 2017 on the label Jazzland Recordings.

In 2018, she released the album Run, Boy, Run with the vocal trio Gurls including Hanna Paulsberg and Ellen Andrea Wang on the Grappa label.

== Discography ==
With Rohey

- 2017: A Million Things (Jazzland)

With Gurls

- 2018: Run Boy, Run (Grappa)
