= Ole Buck =

Danish composer

Ole Buck (born 1 February 1945) is a Danish composer.

Buck was born in Copenhagen. He studied the piano from the age of twelve. He also made many early attempts at orchestral composition, eventually achieving a breakthrough at the age of 20 with Calligraphy for soprano and chamber orchestra. He later studied in Aarhus, producing such works as Fioriture (1965) for flute and piano and Punctuations (1968) for orchestra. Buck's Summertrio (1968) for flute, guitar and cello indicated a new direction for Danish music, promptly dubbed the "New Simplicity".

Other significant pieces in Buck's output include the ballet Felix Luna (1970–71), Fairies (1972) for soprano and orchestra, Pastorals (1976) for orchestra, Microcosm (1992) for string quartet, Rivers and Mountains (1994) for orchestra, and Flower Ornament Music (2002) for chamber group.
