= Ivan Blomqvist =

Swedish jazz musician

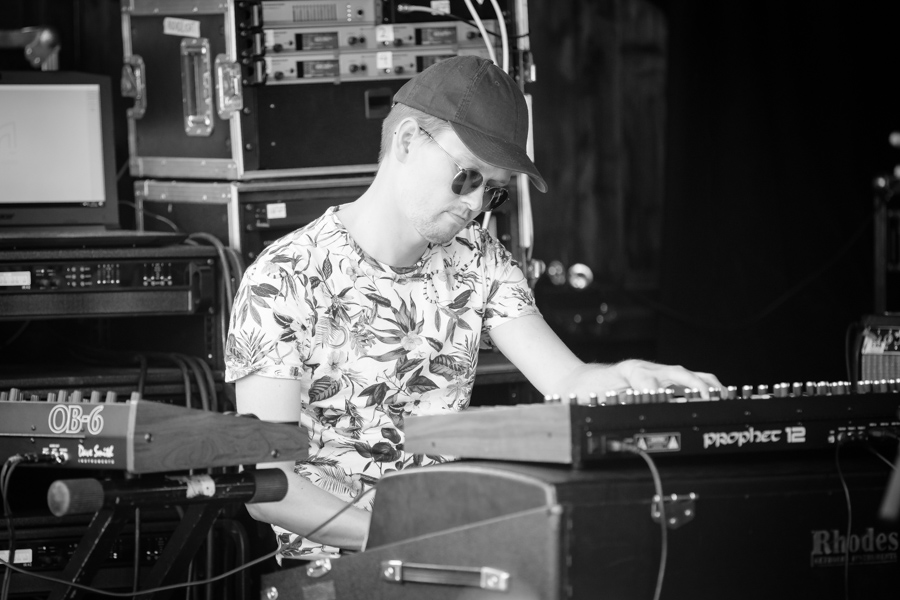
- Blomqvist performing in 2018

Background information
- Origin: Sweden
- Genres: Jazz, electronic, pop
- Occupations: Pianist, composer, producer
- Label: Jazzland Recordings
- Website: www.ivanblomqvist.com

Ivan Blomqvist is a Swedish pianist, composer and music producer based in Oslo, Norway. He works across jazz, electronic music and contemporary popular music.

== Early life and education ==
Blomqvist studied jazz performance at the Norwegian University of Science and Technology (NTNU) in Trondheim.

He later completed practical pedagogical education (PPU) at the Norwegian Academy of Music (NMH).

He is affiliated with master-level studies at NLA University College in Oslo.

== Career ==
Blomqvist works as a pianist, composer and producer. His work combines acoustic piano, improvisation and electronic production, often integrating live performance with electronic elements.

As a solo artist, he has released the albums Nu minns jag (2020) and Bror (2023) on Jazzland Recordings.

On the album Bror (2023), Blomqvist collaborated with several musicians, including Daniel Herskedal.

He has worked as composer, producer and musician for artists including Rohey, dePresno, Neon Ion and Silja Sol.

== Discography ==
=== Solo albums ===
- Nu minns jag (2020) – Jazzland Recordings
- Bror (2023) – Jazzland Recordings

== Selected credits ==
Blomqvist has contributed as composer, producer or musician on recordings including:

- Herkedal – “About to Give It Up” (2026)
- Solo Diarra – “Yimenga” (2025)
- Maiken Kroken – “Ocean” (2024)
- Neon Ion – compositions and keyboards (2020–2026)
- dePresno – “Silence” (2020)
- Linda Sundblad – “Det finnes et hav for dem som våger” (2019)
- Rohey – “A Million Things” (2017)

== Awards and distinctions ==
Blomqvist was selected by Scenkonst Sörmland for the *Unga svenska tonsättare* programme, a commission-based initiative supporting emerging composers.

He was commissioned to create new works to be performed in collaboration with the organisation’s ensembles and invited musicians.

He was nominated for the Spellemann Prize in the category “Newcomer of the Year” (2017) together with Rohey.

== Selected grants and funding ==
Blomqvist has received support from Norwegian and Scandinavian cultural funding bodies, including:

- Statens kunstnerstipend (Arts Council Norway)
- TONO grants
- Musikkfondene (Composers’ Remuneration Fund)
- Norsk komponistforening – project support
- NOPA – development grants
- Norsk Jazzforum – band grants

== Projects ==
A central project in Blomqvist’s work is *Hybrid Music*, which explores the integration of acoustic ensembles and electronic production in live performance contexts.
