= Georg Malmstén =

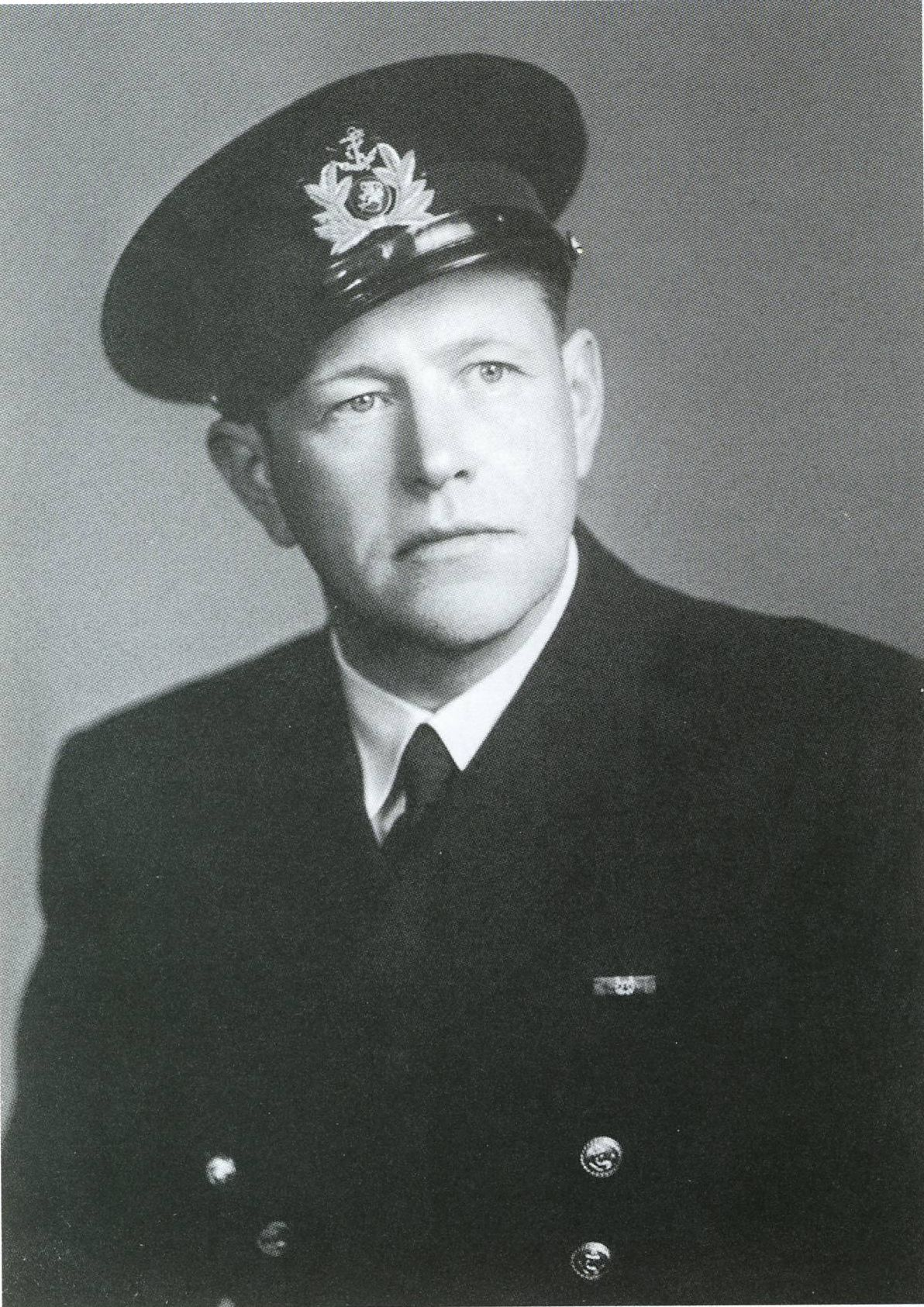
- Georg Malmstén as a Navy officer

Background information
- Born: 27 June 1902
- Died: 25 May 1981 (aged 78)
- Occupations: singer, musician, composer, orchestra conductor, actor
- Website: A Georg Malmstén tribute website

Georg Malmstén (27 June 1902 – 25 May 1981) was a Finnish singer, musician, composer, orchestra conductor and actor. He was one of the most prolific entertainers in Finland of his time, producing over 800 records in numerous genres. In late 1930s, owning a record company, he made about half of his releases under the pseudonym Matti Reima. He was the oldest of three children of a Swedish-speaking family, with Russian ancestry through his mother, Eugenie Petroff, and brother of singer and bandleader Eugen Malmstén.

== Issues with Disney ==
George Malmstén made the first of his "Mikki-Hiiri" songs for his son. Later he would come to make more songs, which would eventually grow into Finnish classics. In 1950's Disney sued him over the similarity of the main character's name to the Finnish translation of Mickey Mouse, "Mikki Hiiri". However, Disney abandoned the case after Malmstén explained that the characters shared nothing in common but a name, which was also written differently. A fact that might suggest that this explanation is true is the song "Mikki-Hiiri ja Susihukka" ("Mikki-Hiiri and the Wolf"), which features an army of Mikki-Hiiris. This leads to the conclusion that the name "Mikki-Hiiri" was just a name for a group of mice. However, there is also a rare song made by Malmstén which contradicts his explanation. The song is about "Mikki-Hiiri" going looking for diamonds and it features several other Mickey Mouse characters that are owned by Disney.
