= Ingebrigt Davik =

Norwegian teacher, children's writer, broadcasting personality, singer and songwriter

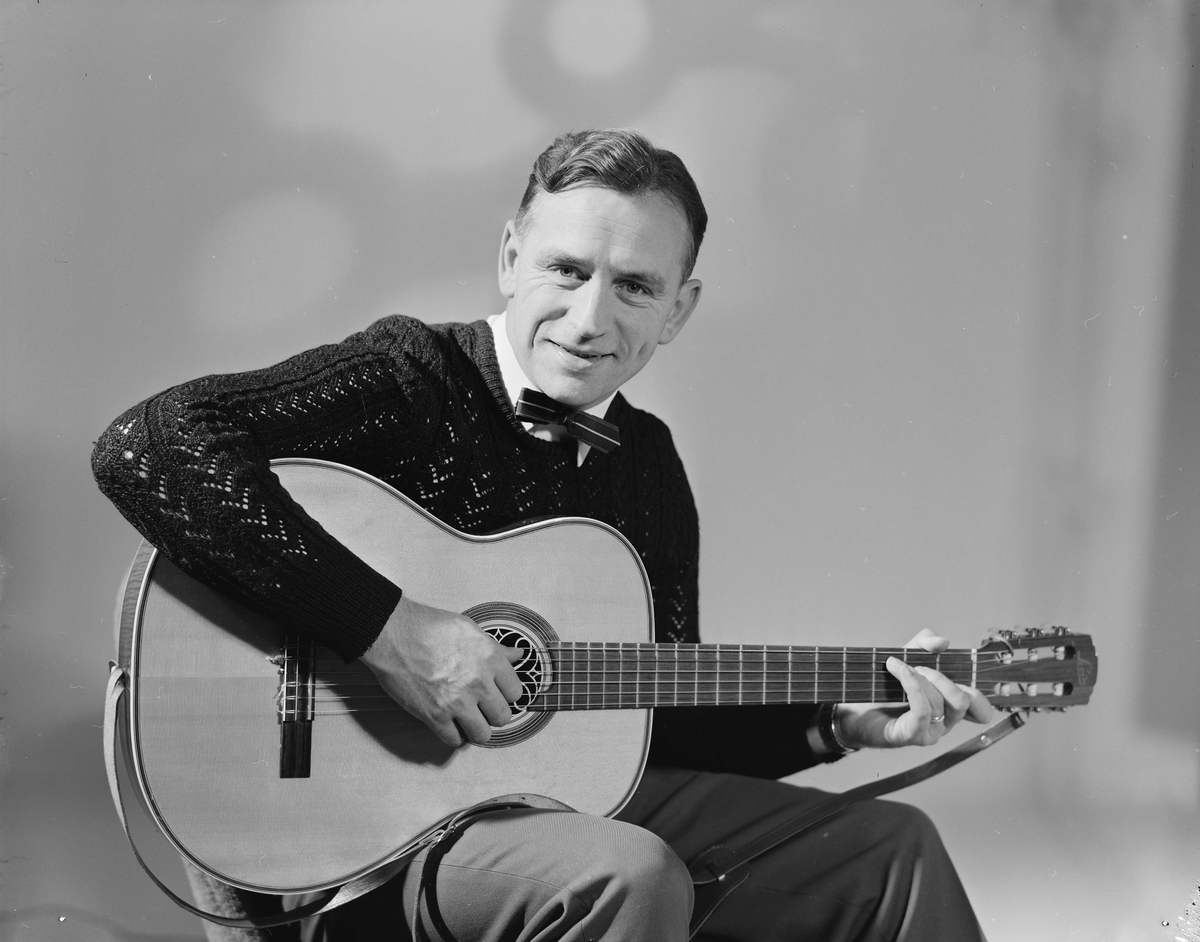
- Ingebrigt Davik in 1962
- Born: 14 April 1925; Haram Municipality, Norway
- Died: 29 January 1991 (aged 65); Oslo
- Occupations: Teacher, children's writer, broadcasting personality, singer and songwriter

Ingebrigt Davik (14 April 1925 – 29 January 1991) was a Norwegian teacher, children's writer, broadcasting personality, singer and songwriter.

== Biography ==
Davik was from the island Fjørtofta in Haram Municipality on Sunnmøre. He was the son of Nils Johan Gerhard Davik (1888–1954) and Johanna Josefine Inga Olsdatter Fjørtoft (1888–1959). The family moved to Brattvåg when he was 6 years old. He trained as a teacher at Hamar and later as a music educator. He also studied drama at Rogaland Teater in Stavanger.

He worked for the Norwegian Broadcasting Corporation from 1959, and made children's programs both for radio and television. He made several television programs based on the children's songs of Margrethe Munthe. Davik's greatest success was "Taremare by" which was listed as a musical at Det Norske Teatret in Oslo and at Den Nationale Scene in Bergen several times in the 1960s and 1970s, and also produced as a cartoon for NRK Television 1978. Davik was also active as a teacher in the Oslo primary school system for a number of years.

Among his children's books is Det hende i Taremareby from 1960, which is also the title of his first music album. The book contains fairytales and songs from a society set at the bottom of the sea. He also translated several radio dramatisations of children's books into Norwegian. Davik was a Norwegian narrator on the British children's television series, Clangers which aired on NRK's Barne-TV from 1972 to1986.

The Culture House in Brattvåg was named Ingebrigt Davik-huset when it opened on March 25, 2006. Outside the building stands a bust of Davik, made by sculptor Ola Stavseng.
