= Seymour Österwall =

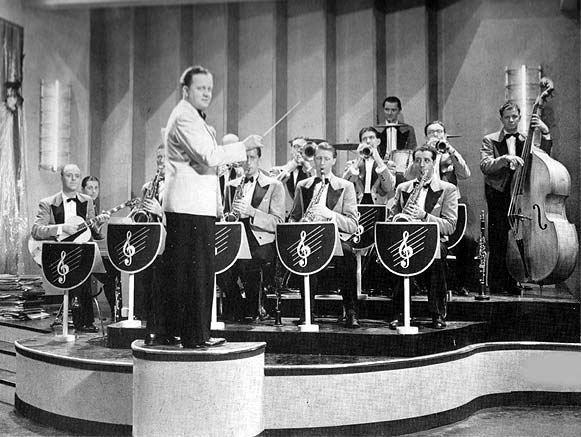
Seymour-osterwalls-orkester playing an instrument

Seymour Österwall (born Karl Seimer Östervall; 20 February 1908 – 3 August 1981) was a Swedish jazz musician (proficient on the tenor saxophone), bandleader and composer.

Österwall was born and died in Stockholm. He played with the orchestra "Seymours Astoria" in the mid-1930s. This band performed at the Swedish Championship of dancesport, which was held at Nalen, a nightclub in Stockholm. Some time after 1935 the name was changed to Seymour Österwall's Orchestra, with whom he appeared until 1960.

Österwall was conductor at Nalen 1934-1956 and later became music director of Folkpark The central organization. Arthur Österwall played double bass in his brother's orchestra until 1944. In the beginning of the 1940s his sister Irmgard Österwall participated as a singer. The band is present in its entirety in the 1941 short film Gatans serenad [Street Serenade].
