= Conrad Baden =

Norwegian composer

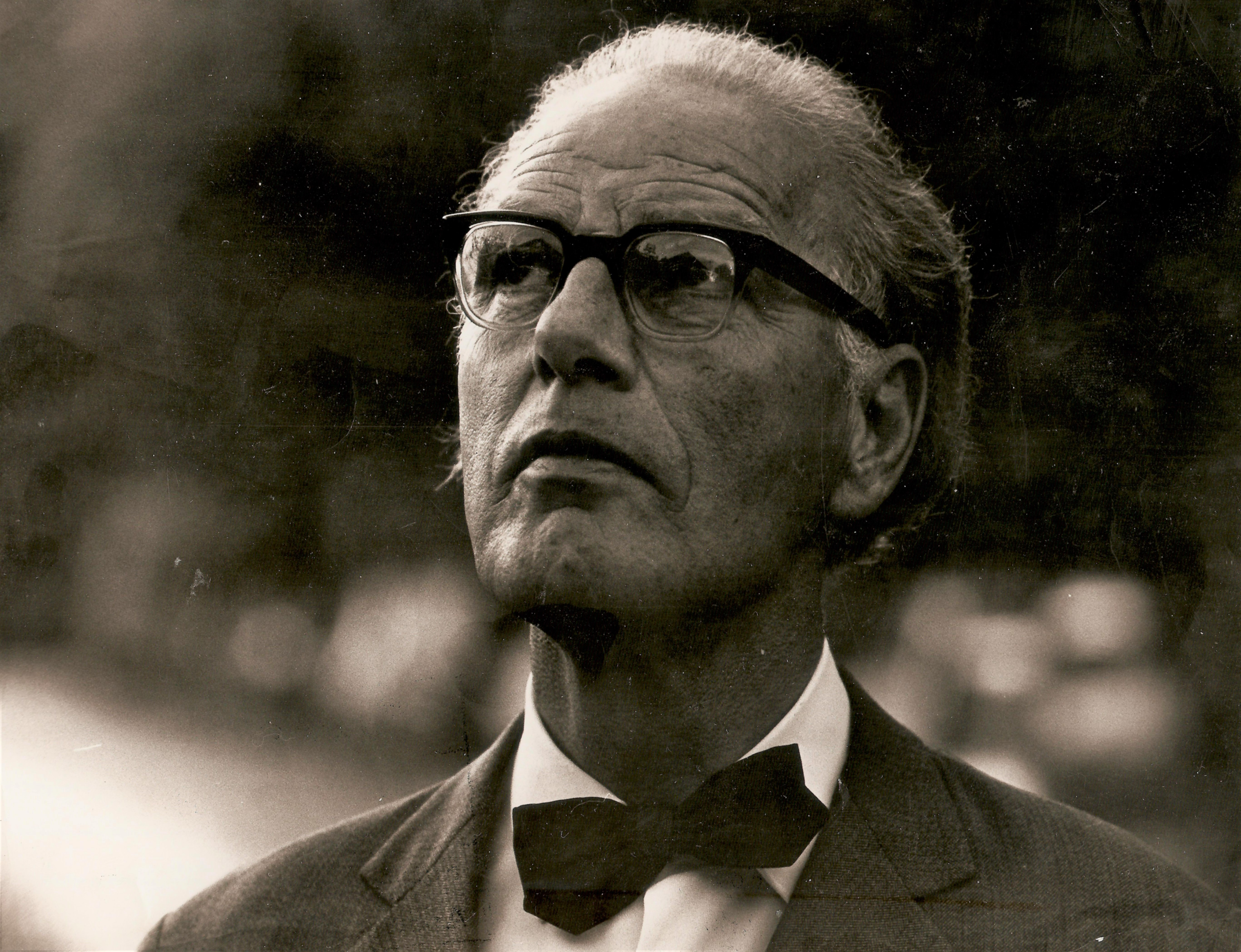
Conrad Baden 1966. Photo: Bergens Tidende

Conrad Baden (31 August 1908 – 11 June 1989) was a Norwegian organist, composer, music educator, and music critic. He had an extensive production of orchestral works, chamber music, vocal works and church music.

He is considered one of the most important Norwegian composers of the 20th century.

== Biography ==
=== Studies ===
He received his first music lessons from his organist father who died when Conrad was 17 years old and about to complete business school. He devoted himself to music and studied piano and organ with the local organist Daniel Hanssen. The young talent soon played to services and oratories. 19 years old, Baden was given organist position in Strømsgodset church.

He studied counterpoint with Palestrina expert Per Steenberg and instrumentation and composition with the composer Bjarne Brustad.

=== Debut ===
In 1936 he gave his debut concert as an organist at the Oslo Cathedral. He eventually became known as an organist and composer of organ works, motets and hymns. During the 1950s Bden was a strong and radical voice amongst discussions concerning a departure from the late romantic style in favour of Lutheran and neobaroque style.

In 1943 he changed his organist position to his father's old church Strømsø in Drammen. In 1946 he appeared as a professional composer in Oslo with a chamber music program. In 1961 he moved with wife and two sons to Oslo and a position in Ris church until 1975. This concluded serving as an organist during 47 years.

=== Work styles ===
==== Neoclassicism of the 1950s ====
Baden's earliest works were penned in a national-romantic style, while his church music works display a close bond to the prevalent Palestrina style of the period. His works from 1950 onwards, were heavily influenced by French Neo-classicism, and in the 60s Baden would also employ twelve-tone techniques, with an increasing use of dissonance. Spring 1965 saw Baden travelling to Vienna to meet Hanns Jelinek, a student of Schönberg and Berg – a visit that led to a stylistic liberation for the Norwegian composer. The following year, this liberation came into fruition in his sole twelve-tone work Hymnus per alto, flauto, oboe e viola with a text from the Latin hymn Vexilla Regis.

A breakthrough as an orchestral composer came in 1955 with the performance of Symphony No. 1. A unique neoclassical work is the Fairytale Suite for Orchestra (1960), inspired by Norwegian traditional stories.

=== Composer ===
Baden composed works in a number of forms, bar opera and electronic music. As a composer, he was highly active. In addition to his vocation as a professional organist through 47 years, he composed a mass for soloists, choirs and orchestra, 200 songs for soloists and choirs, suites and sonatas for piano and other instruments, motets and 11 cantatas. In Baden's compositional output, his church music occupies an equal role to that of his orchestral works – he would write five concertos and smaller orchestral works as well as six symphonies. In addition to his career in composition and as an organist, he taught counterpoint, harmony and composition at the Music Conservatory in Oslo. As a music critic, Baden's reviews were featured in newspapers Drammens Tidende, Vårt Land and Morgenbladet.

== Selected works ==
Compositions not published are available in the National Library, Nasjonalbiblioteket. Works available on streaming services like YouTube and others are marked (Y)

=== Orchestral works ===
- 6 symphonies: nr. 1 1952 (Y), nr. 2 1957 (Y), nr. 3 Sinfonia piccolo 1959, nr. 4 1970 (Y), nr. 5 Sinfonia voluntatis 1976 (Y), nr. 6 Sinfonia espressiva 1980(Y)
- Divertimento 1951
- Ouvertura Gioia 1953
- Pastorale e fuga 1958 (Y)
- Fairytale Suite 1960 (Y)
- Variazioni 1963 (Y)
- Fantasia breve 1965 (Y)
- Concerto per orchestra 1968(Y)
- Intrada sinfonica 1969 (Y)
- Pastorale og rondo 1983 (Y)

=== Concertos ===
- Concertino for clarinet and strings 1954 (Y)
- Concerto for viola and orchestra 1973 (Y)
- Concerto for piano and orchestra 1979 (Y)
- Concerto for bassoon and strings 1981 (Y)
- Concerto for cello og orchestra 1986

Works for chorus, soloist and orchestra

- Mitt fedreland 1943. Text Ola Setrom
- Mass (latin) 1949
- Noregs dag 1966. Text Per Sivle

=== Cantatas ===
- Høyr kor kyrkjeklokka lokkar, choral cantata on a religious folk tune 1963
- A little Christmas Cantata, Puer natus 1965 Norsk Musikforlag (Y)
- Passion Cantata 1964 Norsk Musikforlag (Y)
- University Cantata 1971 (Y)
- Cantatas for the Freemason lodge 1952 and 1981
- Cantata for the cities of Skien and Drammen 1957 and 1985 (Y)
- Cantatas for the churches of Tangen, Strømsø and Drøbak, 1953, 1966 and 1974

=== Chorus with and without accompagnement, also congregational hymns ===
- Mixed choir SATB if not otherwise stated
- Four motets after Book of Psalms 1935–36. Norsk Musikforlag
- Nine hymns 1940-41 (Tenk når en gang/Eg veit ei hamn Norwegian Hymnal) (Y)
- Ten religious folk tunes for male choir 1947 Lyche musikkforlag
- Five songs for male choir 1942-49 Norsk Notestik, Musikk-Huset og Lyche
- Thirteen choral songs 1940-51 Norsk Musikforlag og Musikk-Huset
- Two arrangements of folk tunes for women's choir and organ 1962. Concordia (Y)
- Eight motets 1965 (Ikke enhver som sier. Lyche)
- Two songs and two motets for SAB 1964-67 (Fader jeg vil, Alle de som Faderen Lyche) (Y)
- Two choral arrangementes 1963-68 (O Herre Krist, Jeg vil meg Herren) Lyche
- Two Hamsun songs for male choir 1959-60 (Tonen. Lyche)
- Seven motets 1961-69 Østnorsk musikkforlag and Lyche
- Two motets for choir and organ (Psalm 150 and Se, Gud er min frelse) Norsk Musikforlag. Lyche (Y)
- Three church song for children's/women's choir 1953-70 (Ave Maria og Sanctus, Lyche)
- Seven Skjæraasensongs for children's/women's choir 1955-70 Lyche
- Four introitus for choir and organ 1964-70 (Stå opp, Vi er hans verk, I samme stund. Lyche) (Y)
- Two motets 1958-70 (Pange Lingua, Trøst mitt folk) Lyche (Y)
- Five Setrom-songs for male choir 1942-71 Norsk Musikforlag. Lyche (Y)
- To Spring songs for women's choir 1960-71 Tekst Vinje, Sande. Norsk Musikforlag. Lyche
- Four songs 1960-72 (Ja, Herre, eg høyrer. Norderval. Lunde forlag)
- Six arrangements of religious folk tunes 1958-75 Lyche
- Ten hymns 1979 (Som spede barnet Norwegian Hymnal ) (Y)
- Thirteen hymns 1979 (Vi hilser din gjenkomst Norwegian Hymnal 1985)
- Herre ha takk, from Eight solo songs. Text Trygve Bjerkrheim. 1981 (Y)
- Seven motets (1981-87 (Jeg er oppstandelsen, I fred) Norsk Musikforlag. Lyche
- Thirteen hymns. Text Svein Ellingsen 1983-88 (Døden må vike Norwegian Hymnal) (Y)
- Taubeana for mixed choir, baryton and piano. 1979. Potpourri on six songs by Evert Taube
- Sixteen songs 1971-89 (Lykken/Happiness for children's chorus Skjæraasen. 1971 Wilhelm
- Hansen/Reimers. God Nat/Good Night Wergeland for children's chorus 1976 (Y). Lilja Aslaug Vaa, 1977, for women's chorus. Norsk Musikforlag

=== Chamber music ===
- 4 string quartets (nr. 1 1941, nr. 2 1943, nr. 3 1961, nr. 4 1983 (Y))
- Sonata for violin and piano 1941
- Piano Trio 1947
- Alla marcia, from Little suite for piano 1947, arr. for 11 wind instruments. E. Gamm Musikverlag, Bochum
- Trio for flute, obo and clarinet 1957 Lyche (Y)
- Flute sonata (solo) 1957 Norsk Musikforlag (Y)
- Elegie for violin and organ 1960 Lyche (Y)
- Wind quintet no 1 1963, no 2 1982 (Y)
- Wind trio no 2 (Divertimento) for flute, obo and clarinet 1964 (Y)
- Hymnus (Vexilla regis) for alto, flute, oboe and viola 1966 Norsk Musikforlag (Y)
- Clarinet quintet 1971 (Y)
- Fantasi boreale for cello and piano 1974
- Partita folk tune Now the day is over, for brass sextett 1975. Norsk Musikforlag
- Mini-trio for flute, clarinet and bassoon 1977 (Y)
- Sonata nr. 1 for obo and organ 1978 (Y)
- Sonata for bass clarinet and piano 1978 (Y)
- Two movements for violin and organ 1983 (with Elegie 1960 Sonata)
- Sonata for flute and piano 1984 (Y)
- Pezzi sentimento per violincello 1984
- Dialogues for two clarinets 1984
- Sonata nr. 2 for obo og keyboard 1985 (Y)

=== Piano ===
- Little suite 1947 Preludium.Vals.Fughetta.Vise (Y). Alla marcia
- Scherzo 1957 Pro Piano hefte 3 Lyche
- 10 small pieces for children. 1963. Lyche
- Three piano pieces 1964. Preludium, Aria, Scherzo
- Ten small pieces for piano. For education 1967. Norsk Musikforlag (Y)
- 10 Bagatelles for piano 1971. Norsk Musikforlag
- Choral partita nr. 5 for keyboard, folk tune I himmelen 1975 Norsk Musikforlag
- Suite for piano 1976 Preludio. Tema con variazioni. Intermezzo. Toccata. (Y)
- Variazioni libere 1979 (Y)

=== Organ ===
- Passacaglia 1930 (Y)
- Choral partita no 1 Christ lag in Todesbanden 1936 Norsk Notestik
- Sonata b-minor 1939. Cantando (Y)
- Phantay and fugue St. Olav-song Ljoset yver landet dagna 1939
- Three choral preludes 1946 In collection 28 koralforspill av norske organister. Norsk Musikforlag
- Toccata, choral and fugue St. Olav-song Lux illuxit 1946 Lyche (Y)
- Four chorale preludes Våkn op. Kom hit. Gud skal allting lage. Sørg, o kjære Fader 1949 Lyche
- Prelude, pastorale and chaconne 1951 Nordiska Musikförlaget, in Musica Organi III
- Five organ chorales. Melodies by L.M.Lindeman 1955 Lyche
- Sonatina 1956 (Y)
- Toccata, choral and fugue religious folk tune Korset vil jeg aldri svike 1957 Lyche (Y)
- Choral partita nr. 2 Macht hoch die Tür 1960. Cantando (Y)
- Organ book from Strømsø church 56 organ chorales and chorale preludes 1943–60
- Twelve organ chorales on Norwegian folk tunes 1958-61 Lyche (Y)
- Two organ works for advent 1958-63 (Toccata Konge er du visst Cantando)
- Pezzi concertante, suite. Preludio. Pastorale. Tema con variationi. Fuga. 1966. Norsk Musikforlag (Y)
- Nuptial intrada nr. 1 Kjærlighet er lysets kilde 1969 Vest-Norsk, in Norwegian Processional Music
- Choral partita nr. 3 O Lamm Gottes 1972 Cantando (Y)
- Choral partita nr. 4 religious folk tune Jeg ser deg O Guds lam 1972. Norsk Musikforlag (Y)
- Sonata sacra 1974. For Maria Church, Bergen. (Y)
- Choral partita nr. 5 for keyboard, folk tune I himmelen 1975 Norsk Musikforlag (Y)
- Organ book from Ris church 1961-75 Ca. 750 organ chorales and choral preludes. Selections in
- Musikkhuset (50 Organ chorales) and Cantando-Permen
- Suite boreale. Introduksjon. Toccata. Interludium. Passacaglia. 1976
- Chorale partita nr. 6 Jeg løfter opp til Gud min sang 1976. Noton-Cantando (Y)
- Sonata nr.1 for obo and organ 1978 (Y)
- Sonata rigorosa (Organ sonata nr. 3) 1978
- Choral phantasy Grosser Gott, wir loben dich 1980 Cantando (Y)
- Sonata al festo (Organ sonata nr. 4) 1984 (Y)
- Sonata nr. 2 for obo and keyboard 1985 (Y)
- Nuptial intrada nr. 2 1984. Cantando in Jubilate nr.2

=== Solo songs ===
- Eleven songs 1930–35
- To Norwegian songs and Lilja. 1942 Text Aslaug Vaa. Lyche
- Four songs 1942.Text Henrik Rytter. Lyche
- Four Setrom songs 1942
- To Edda-poems 1942–44
- Four songs 1942-44 Text Anna-Lisa Jörstad
- Four biblical songs for solo and organ. Gospel of John 1945–60
- Nine songs 1953-69 Text Wergeland, Aukrust, Obstfelder, Hamsun and others.
- Lykken (Happiness) 1971 Text Skjæraasen
- Two Fröding-songs for barytone og piano (En vintervisa, En vårfästmö) 1972
- Four Skjæraasen songs (Sinn, Norsk salme, Sang på elva, Gjenskinn)1972 Norsk Musikforlag (In 6 Songs) (Y)
- Two biblical songs for soprano, oboe and organ (Til deg Herre, Jeg vil glede meg) 1975 (Y)
- Fourteen religious folk tunes 1963-75 (I dag er nådens tid og Gå varlig. Concordia)
- Four solo motets. Gospel of John 1966-76 (Y)
- God nat (Good night) 1976. Text Wergeland. Barnesalmeboka Verbum-IKO (Y)
- Three songs (Di makt, Bruheim. Fødd i går, H. M. Vesaas. August, Skjæraasen) 1979 Norsk Musikforlag (In 6 Songs) (Y)
- Three solo motets for deep voice (Søk Herren, Drag inn, Fariseeren og tolderen) 1980
- Eight songs Text Trygve Bjerkrheim 1981-82 (Takk for den Heilage Ande! /Thank The Holy Spirit) (Y)
- Old Maria Song, arrangement 1982. Norsk Musikforlag (In 6 Songs)
- Four biblical songs for deep voice, Book of Psalms 1983–85

=== 3 melodies in Norwegian Hymnal 2013 ===
- 868 Eg veit ei hamn (Original Tenk når engang) 1941 Text Bjarne Rabben (Y)
- 576 Som spede barnet 1979 Text Britt G. Hallqvist (Y)
- 209 Døden må vike 1983 Text Svein Ellingsen (Y)

== Discography ==
=== Orchestra ===
- Concertino for clarinet and strings Philips 1972. Simax 2008 PSC 1802. CD GRONG GMP 2010.
- Pastorale and fuge for chamber orchestra Simax 2008 PSC 1802
- Fairytale Suite Simax 2008 PSC 1802
- Variazioni. Simax 2008 PSC 1802
- Fantasia breve. Philips 1978
- Intrada sinfonica. Philips 1972. Simax 2008 PSC 1802
- Piano concerto. Simax 2008 PSC 1802
- Sinfonia espressiva, nr. 6. Norwegian composers 1983 and Norsk musikkproduksjon 1988

=== Chamber music ===
- Wind trio nr. 1. Philips 1967. Norwegian composers 1983
- Flute sonata, solo Norsk komponistforening 1986
- Hymnus for song and three instruments Kirkelig kulturverksted 1978. Lawo 2020
- Clarinet quintet Philips 1980
- Suite for piano. Norwegian composers 1983
- Sonata nr. 1 for oboe and organ. Kirkelig kulturverksted 1978
- Sonata for bass clarinet and piano. Norsk musikkproduksjon 1989/2002
- Variationi libere for piano. Norwegian composers 1983

=== Organ ===
- Toccata, choral and fuge folk tune Korset vil jeg aldri svike. Philips 1969. Vest-Norsk Plateselskap 2005
- From Twelve organ chorales on folk tunes. Rogalyd/PaVi 2000
- Pezzi concertante. Norwegian Composers 1976
- Chorale partita nr. 4on folk tune Jeg ser deg O Guds lam Norwegian Composers 1977 og 2014.
- Chorale partita nr. 5 for keyboard, folk tune I himmelen. Hamar domkirke 2012
- Chorale partita nr. 6 Jeg løfter opp til Gud min sang. Varese 1983 VS-84002

=== Vocal music ===
- Nuptial Hymn for choir Lu-mi 1975
- Norwegian song, Eg er’kje eismal for solo and piano. Nor-Disc 1970
- Religious folk tune Mitt hjerte alltid vanker for male choir Eton 1972
- A little Christmas Cantata Puer natus 1965 Norsk Musikforlag. Kirkelig kulturverksted 1978
- Psalm 150. MLLP Nidaros domkirke 1986
- Sanctus for children's choir. His Master's Voice 1970
- Introitus for choir and organ. Kirkelig Kulturverksted 1975
- Pange lingua, motet Kirkelig kulturverksted 1978
- Trøst mitt folk, motet. Kirkelig kulturverksted 1978
- Sus, sunnanvind for male choir. Cantio 1994
- Ja, Herre, eg høyrer for choir. Lynor 1975
- Skjæraasen songs for solo and piano. Norwegian Composers 1983.
- Two biblical songs Kirkelig kulturverksted 1978
- Religious folksongs for song and piano/organ. Lu-mi 1973
- Three solomotets Gospel St. John, Hamnes DSH02 2012
- Three solo songs. Norwegian Composers 1983. Euridice 2008
- Herre ha takk/Thank The Holy Spirit for song and organ Lynor 1984
- Vaarkjenning for women's choir. Varese 1983

== Literature ==
- Aurdal, Gunnar Sigve 2007 Paul Hindemiths påverknad på norske etterkrigskomponistar- Finn Mortensen, Egil Hovland, Conrad Baden. dissertation University of Oslo. www.duo.uio.no/bitstream/handle/10852/27144/Masteroppgave.pdf?sequence=1&isAllowed=y
- Baden, Torkil 1977 Conrad Baden. Norske komponister, red. Kjell Bækkelund. Tiden
- Baden, Torkil 1977 Conrad Badens komposisjoner. Dissertation University of Oslo
- Baden, Torkil 1979 Fantasia breve per orchestra og Conrad Badens symfoniske stil. Studia Musicologica.Yearbook Oslo University Press
- Baden, Torkil 1995 Baden: organist-komponist. Toner i tusen år - en norsk kirkemusikkhistorie. Verbum
- Baden, Torkil 2020 Conrad Baden - komponist, kirkemusiker, konservatorielærer og kritiker. Biografi med verkliste. (with list of works) https://www.hf.uio.no/imv/forskning/prosjekter/norgesmusikk/musikkhistarkiv/publikasjoner/baden_conrad_biografi_verker.pdf
- Grinde; Nils 1981: Conrad Baden, i Norsk musikkhistorie
- Herresthal, Harald 1972 Kirkemusikeren og komponisten Conrad Baden. Norsk musikktidsskrift 1971 nr, 2,3 og 4, 1972 nr. 1
- Herresthal, Harald 2008 Orchestral works by Conrad Baden. Liner notes Simax PSC 1802, 2008, in English
- Nesheim, Elef 2009 Conrad Baden, Norsk biografisk leksikon. https://nbl.snl.no/Conrad_Baden

National Library of Norway has collected sheet music, critics, programmes and other documents after Conrad Baden.
