= Svein Øvergaard =

Norwegian saxophonist (1912-1986)

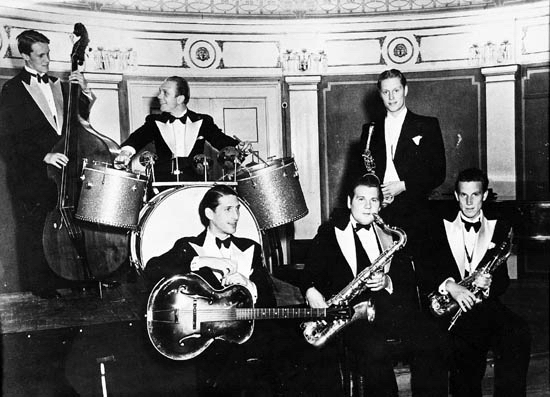
- Øvergaards orchestra Oslo, 1939. Øvergaard is no. 2 from the right.

Background information
- Born: Svein Arne Øvergaard; 1 January 1912; Kristiania, Norway (Oslo)
- Origin: Norway
- Died: 23 November 1986 (aged 74) Oslo, Norway
- Occupations: Musician, band leader
- Instruments: Drums, percussion, saxophone
- Labels: Gemini Music

Svein Arne Øvergaard (1 January 1912 in Kristiania (Oslo) – 23 November 1986 in Oslo) was a Norwegian resistance member, boxer and jazz musician (saxophone, percussion) and band leader, married to Gunhild Øvergaard (born Sandberg, 1912–1996), and known from the jazz scenes of Oslo.

== Biography ==
Øvergaard played in Willie Vieth's Kaba Orchestra and as leader of the mighty popular Funny Boys (1932–39), he was among the first Norwegian jazz musicians to be known outside of Norway. From 1937 he led since his own orchestra, including with bassist Fred Lange-Nielsen, drummer Per Gregersen, guitarist Finn Westbye, saxophonist Arvid Gram Paulsen, and clarinetist Einar Gustavsen. He also collaborated frequently with drummer Pete Brown and guitarist Robert Normann.

In 1938 he was Norwegian champion in boxing, junior light heavyweight, for the Boxing Club Pugilist. During World War II, he vent to the United Kingdom and became part of Linge Company with telegraph as main work.

== Discography ==
With Funny Boys

- 2001: Jazz in Norway vol. 2 1938-43 (RCA)
