= Erlend Tvinnereim =

Norwegian singer

- Born: 3 August 1981 (age 44); Bergen, Hordaland
- Origin: Norway
- Occupation(s): Tenor opera and concert singer
- Instrument: Vocals
- Years active: 2007 to present
- Website: Official website

Erlend Tvinnereim (born 3 August 1981) is a Norwegian tenor based in Zürich, Switzerland. He has in recent years been much used as a concert singer in Switzerland, Germany and Scandinavia, and in the season 08/09 he performed as "young artist" at the opera in Basel where he cased several significant roles.

== Career ==
Tvinnereim was born in Bergen. He attended the Toneheim Folkehøgskole (2000–01), and continued his vocal studies at the Grieg Academy, University of Bergen, and he earned a Bachelor's degree at the Institute of Music in Trondheim at Trondheim Musikkonsevatorium (NTNU), with Professors Kåre Bjørkøy and Harald Bjørkøy. He has since 2006, been a resident of Zurich, Switzerland, where he has completed his "Konzertdiplom" and "Soloist Diploma" at the Academy of Music in Zurich. After further studies with Scot Weir and the song class with Hartmut Höll at the University for Music and Theater Zurich in March 2009, he made his concert diploma with honors in June 2011, the soloist diploma. Tvinnereim also attended numerous masterclasses with such as Ileana Cotrubaş, Werner Güra, Jill Feldmann, Hans Peter Blochwitz, Susanna Eken, Håkan Hagegård, Anne-Lise Berntsen and was a student of the class Lied pianist Hartmut Höll.

Tvinnereims repertoire ranges widely from lieder to church music and opera. Especially in sacred music, his lyrical voice has been used as the Evangelist and arias for the performances of Bach's St John Passion, St Matthew Passion, St Mark Passion, Christmas Oratorio, Magnificat and various cantatas and masses, Handel's Messiah, Theodora, Belshazzar, Solomon and Dixit Dominus, Haydn's Die Schöpfung and Michael Haydn's Requiem, among others.

He made his stage debut as Tamino in The Magic Flute at the opera in Biel/Solothurn a production of Schweizer Opernstudio and the role of Peter Quint in Britten's opera "The Turn of the Screw" during the Festival of the Arts in Zurich 2007. In the season 2008/09, he was engaged as a member of the Young Artist Program at Opera in Basel, Switzerland which was heard in a number of different productions set. These included the roles of Steuermann in the Flying Holländer, L'Aumonier in Les Dialogues des Carmelites, and lead actor in children Schaf opera, La Bohème and Art opera Il tempo del postino M. M. For the year 2010 he won a stipendiumspris from "Migros Kulturprozent" in Switzerland and Bergen municipality establishing scholarships for young artists. In recent years, he has given concerts in many parts of Switzerland, Germany and Norway and sung the operas in Geneva, Basel, St.Gallen, Bergen (The New Opera) Tromsø (Opera North) and Szeged (Hungary), as well as soloist performances in Norwegian and German national radio and television. He recited famous arias from operas, operettas and musicals, together with the award-winning Norwegian soprano Ann-Helen Moen at the Trondheim Chamber Music Festival 2013.

== Honors ==
- «Migros Kulturprozent» of Switzerland
- Bergen municipality establishing scholarships for young artists
