= Gemini Records albums discography =

The following is a summary of the Gemini Records albums. Gemini Records is a Norwegian record label.

GMLP 47	Bjarne Nerem	This Is Always	1984	LP
GMALP 48	Totti Bergh	I Hear A Rhapsody	1995	LP
GMCD 49	Harald Bergersen & Atle Hammer	Joy Spring	1988	CD/LP
GMCD 52	Bjørn Johansen	Dear Henrik	1988	CD/LP
GMLP 54	Laila Dalseth & Al Cohn	Travelling Light	1987	LP
GMCD 55	Rowland Greenberg	How about you?	1988	CD/LP
GMLP 56	Bjarne Nerem	More Than You Know	1987	LP
GMCD 57	Magni Wentzel, Art Farmer, Egil Kapstad, Terje Venaas, Egil Johansen	My Wonderful One	1988	CD/LP
GMLP 59	Bjarne Nerem, Kenny Davern, Flip Phillips	Mood Indigo	1988	CD/LP
GMCD 61	Egil Kapstad	Cherokee	1989	CD/LP
GMLP 62	Al Grey & Bjarne Nerem	Al Meets Bjarne	1989	LP
GMLP 63	Knut Riisnæs & Red Holloway	Confessin' The Blues	1991	LP
GMLP 66	Laila Dalseth	Some Other Time	1991	LP
GMLP 69	Benny Bailey Quintet	While My Lady Sleeps	1991	LP
GMCD 73	Einar Iversen	Who Can I Turn To	1992	CD
GMCD 74	Magni Wentzel, Roger Kellaway, Red Mitchell	New York Nights	1992	CD
GMCD 78	Totti Bergh & Plas Johnson	On The Trail!	1993	CD
GMCD 82	Egil Kapstad	Remembrance	1994	CD
GMCD 88	Totti Bergh	Remember	1995	CD
GMCD 89	Per Husby	If You Could See Me Now	1996	CD
GMCD 92	Ditlef Eckhoff	Impressions Of Antibes	1997	CD
GMCD 94	The Alf Kjellman Project	You'll Always Need Friends	1998	CD
GMCD 103	Various artists	Distant Reports - Jazz From North Norway	2001	CD
GMCD 105	Tore Johansen feat. Karin Krog	Man, Woman And Child	2000	CD
GMCD 108	Tore Johansen	Happy Days	2002	CD
GMCD 110	Per Husby Septet	Peacemaker	2003	CD
GMCD 111	Jan Kåre Hystad Kvartett	Vargtime - Varg Veums Favoritter	2002	CD
GMCD 113	Tore Johansen	Windows	2003	CD
GMCD 121	Tore Johansen feat. Karin Krog	Like That	2005	CD
GMCD 122	Jan Lundgren, Georg Riedel	Lockrop	2006	CD
