= Svein Christiansen =

Norwegian jazz drummer (1941–2015)

- Also known as: Chrico
- Born: August 6, 1941; Kolbotn, Reichskommissariat Norwegen (today Norway)
- Died: 25 November 2015 (aged 74) Strømmen, Norway
- Genres: Jazz
- Occupations: Musician, composer, drummer, percussionist
- Instruments: Drums and percussions

Svein "Chrico" Christiansen (6 August 1941 – 25 November 2015) was a Norwegian jazz musician (drums), known from a number of recordings, and central on the Oslo Jazz scene.

== Career ==
Christiansen started early to play drums in various bands in the Oslo area like "Hot Saints" (1958–60), "Veitvet musikkskoles storband", and in ensembles led by Oddvar Paulsen, Roy Hellvin, Helge Hurum, Fred Nøddelund and Frode Thingnæs. He played on albums by Einar Iversen, Egil Kapstad, Karin Krog, Terje Bjørklund, Svein Finnerud/Trond Botnen, Terje Rypdal (Odyssey, 1975), Knut Riisnæs, Radka Toneff, Jon Eberson, Laila Dalseth, Øystein Sevåg, Jens Wendelboe, Susanne Fuhr, Dag Arnesen (Renascent, 1984), within "Out To Lunch", and with Bjørn Alterhaug and Helge Iberg.

He also appeared on records in other genres, with "Kjerringrokk" (1975), Svein Finjarn (Soloflight, 1978), "LASA" (Released, 1980), "Stiftelsen" (1981), Odd Børretzen (På den ene siden – På den andre siden, 1976) and Bjørn Eidsvåg (Live i Ny York 1981, Passe gal 1983), Jan Eggum (En natt forbi 1979, 30/30, 2005), Lars Klevstrand (Frie hender, 1981), Lystad/Mjøen, Ryfylke Visegruppe (Forlis, 1983) and Trond-Viggo Torgersen (Harunåsågirebort, 1978).

During the 1970s, he was also in Oslo-Filharmonien, "Radiostorbandet", Kringkastingsorkesteret (1980–2003) and "Per Nyhaug Studioband", and recently in "Willy Andresen Quartet", Einar Iversen Trio, trio with Dag Arnesen and Terje Gewelt, Totti Bergh Quintet, Tine Asmundsen Trio, Quartet and Quintet (1999–), as well as in the band "Bone Thang". He died in Oslo in 2015.

== Family ==
Christiansen was married to the actress Sidsel Ryen (born 1943).

== Honors ==
- Gammleng-prisen (1989) in the class "Studio Musician»

== Discography (in selection) ==
With Karin Krog & Friends

- 1968: Joy (Sonet)

With Øystein Sunde

- 1971: Det Året Det Var Så Bratt (CBS)
- 1976: På Sangens Vinger (Philips)

With Terje Rypdal

- 1975: Odyssey (ECM Records|ECM)

With Radka Toneff

- 1979: It Don't Come Easy (Zarepta)
- 2008: Set It Free - Et Portrett Av Radka Toneff (KRF)
- 2008: Butterfly (Curling Legs)

With Jan Eggum

- 1979: En natt forbi (CBS Records|CBS)
- 2005: 30/30 (Grappa Music)

With Bjørn Eidsvåg

- 1981: Live i Ny York (Kirkelig Kulturverksted)
- 1983: Passe gal (Kirkelig Kulturverksted)

With Jens Wendelboe Big Band

- 1984: 'Lone Attic (NOPA)
- 2012: Fresh Heat (Rosa Records)

Within The Norwegian Radio Big Band

- 1986: The Norwegian Radio Big Band Meets Bob Florence (Odin Records)
- 1989: The Norwegian Radio Big Band Meets Bill Holman (Taurus Records )

Within "Out To Lunch" – quintet with Bjørn Klakegg, Olaf Kamfjord, Rune Klakegg & Vidar Johansen

- 1988: Out To Lunch (Odin Records)
- 1995: Kullboksrytter (Curling Legs), with The Norwegian String Quartet & Sidsel Endresen

Within Svein Finnerud Trio

- 1994: Travel Pillow (Prisma Records)

With Dag Arnesen & Terje Gewelt – trio

- 1994: Movin' (Taurus Records)
- 1998: Inner Lines (Resonant Music)

With Tine Asmundsen's «Lonely Woman»

- 2003: aLive (Hazel Jazz)
- 2005: Demon's Diversions (Hazel Jazz)
- 2008: Radegund (Hazel Jazz)
- 2012: Lovely Luna (Hazel Jazz)

With other projects

- 1976: På den ene siden – På den andre siden (Bare Bra Musikk), with Odd Børretzen
- 1981: Frie hender (Mai), with Lars Klevstrand
