= Harald Halvorsen (musician) =

- Born: Harald Andreas Halvorsen; 20 June 1949 (age 77); Haugesund, Norway
- Origin: Norway
- Genres: Jazz
- Occupations: Musician, composer
- Instrument: Trombone

Harald Andreas Halvorsen (born 20 June 1949 in Haugesund, Norway) is a Norwegian musician (trombonist), known from bands like Egil Monn Iversen's Big Band, The Gambian-Norwegian Friendship Orchestra, Jens Wendelboe Big Band, The Norwegian Radio Big Band and The Rainbow Band.

== Career ==
Halvorsen was raised in Haugesund, where he led his own big band in 1970'es, before he moved to Bergen to attend studies at the Bergen Musikkonservatorium (1978). In Bergen he had a quintet with saxophonist Øystein Søbstad (1971–73). They participated in Norwegian Jazz Association anniversary concerts 1973. He was also a member of the ensemble Lyderhorn (from 1972), led The Bergen Ballade Orkester (1973–74), which had its festival debut Kongsberg Jazzfestival 1974. He led his own quartet from 1974, besides participation in the band Octopus (until 1976), Bergen Big Band, Dag Arnesen Septet among others.

Halvorsen translocated to Oslo in 1978, for employment in Forsvarets Stabsmusikk. As jazz musician he continued within bands like Østereng/Hurums Radiostorband (1978–90) with album releases in 1986 and 1987, Geir Hauger Sextet (1979–81) and Vestlandssekstetten (1980–81). In addition he collaborated with bands like Søyr (Molde 1979), Erling Aksdal (1980), Per Husby (1984), Monk Memorial (Kongsberg Jazzfestival 1987) dan Hansen/Gundhus Big Band (1988). He participated on recordings with The Gambian-Norwegian Friendship Orchestra (1982), Jens Wendelboe Big Band (1983), Kjell Karlsen Big Band (one recorded in 1984 and one released in 2001) and Jens Wendelboe Big Crazy Energy Band (1991–92).

From 1990 Halvorsen was simultaneously active in three smaller bands, "Bone Brothers" with Frode Thingnæs, the octet Cool-In-West (1990–92), as well as a band holding his own name. In larger format, he participated on the album A tribute to Frank Sinatra with Bjørn Jørgensen Big Band (released 2006), Live at Lancelot with Storeslem and Takin' Off with Per Borthen Swing Dept, the last two recorded in 2007. In 2006–07 he collaborated with John Surman's Rainbow Band (Sessions released in 2011).

== Discography ==
With Jan Eggum

- 1977: Heksedans (Columbia Records)

With Laila Dalseth

- 1978: Glad There Is You (Talent Records)

With Pål Thowsen

- 1981: Carnival (NorDisc)

With The Gambian-Norwegian Friendship Orchestra

- 1983: Friendship (Odin Records)

With Jens Wendelboe

- 1983: 'Lone Attic (NOPA Records), within Jens Wendelboe Big Band
- 1994: Big Crazy Energy Band, Vol. 2 (NOPA Records)

With Sylfest Strutle

- 1985: Live at Gildevangen (Camp Records)

With The Norwegian Radio Big Band

- 1986: The Norwegian Radio Big Band Meets Bob Florence (Odin Records)

With Sigvart Dagsland

- 1987: De Umulige (Kirkelig Kulturverksted)

With Odd Riisnæs Project

- 1996: Your Ship (Gemini Records)

With Bjørn Johansen

- 2001: Portrait of a Norwegian Jazz Artist (Gemini Records), presented by the Oslo Jazz Circle

With The Rainbow Band, directed by John Surman

- 2011: The Rainbow Band Sessions (Losen Records)
