= Taurus Records albums discography =

The following is a summary of the Taurus Records albums. Taurus is a Norwegian record label with records published by the parent label Gemini Records.

| Catalogue no. | Artist | Title | Release date | Format |
|---|---|---|---|---|
| TRCD 825 | Dag Arnesen, Kåre Garnes, Odd Riisnæs, Tom Olstad | Speak Low | 1988 | LP |
| TRCD 826 | Bill Holman, The Norwegian Radio Big Band | The Norwegian Radio Big Band Meets Bill Holman | 1987 | CD |
| TRLP 827 | Jon Gordon | Beginnings And Endings | 1989 | LP |
| TRCD 828 | Odd Riisnæs Quartet | Thoughts | 1990 | CD |
| TRCD 829 | Dag Arnesen Quintet | The Day After | 1990 | CD |
| TRCD 830 | Dag Arnesen, Terje Gewelt, Svein Christiansen feat. Wenche Gausdal | Photographs | 1992 | CD |
| TRCD 831 | Odd Riisnæs | Another Version | 1993 | CD |
| TRCD 832 | Dag Arnesen, Terje Gewelt, Svein Christiansen | Movin' | 1994 | CD |
| TRCD 833 | Sigurd Ulveseth Quartet | To Wisdom, The Prize | 1995 | CD |
| TRCD 834 | Marit Sandvik & Jazz I Nord | Song, Fall Soft | 1995 | CD |
| TRCD 835 | Odd Riisnæs Project | Your Ship | 1996 | CD |
| TRCD 836 | OJH Quartet | Touch Of Time | 1997 | CD |
| TRCD 837 | Sigurd Ulveseth | Infant Eyes | 1997 | CD |
| TRCD 838 | Espen Rud | Rudlende | 1998 | CD |
| TRCD 839 | Ivar Antonsen | Double Circle | 1999 | CD |
| TRCD 840 | Ivar Antonsen | Dream Come True / Andy LaVerne & Ivar Antonsen | 2000 | CD |
| TRCD 842 | Ole Jacob Hystad Quartet | Touch Of Time | 2002 | CD |
| TRCD 843 | Marit Sandvik Band | Even Then (Mother Song) | 2002 | CD |
| TRCD 844 | Atle Nymo Frode Nymo Quartet feat. Roger Kellaway | Inner Urge | 2004 | CD |
| TRCD 845 | Dag Arnesen, Terje Gewelt, Pål Thowsen | Time Enough | 2005 | CD |
| TRCD 846 | Bossa Nordpå, Marit Sandvik | Uma Onda No Mar | 2005 | CD |
| TRCD 847 | John Pål Inderberg | Sval Draum | 2005 | CD |
| TRCD 848 | Roger Johansen | Evening Songs | 2005 | CD |
| TRCD 565 | Wenche Gausdal | Den lille forskjellen ... | 2004 | CD |
