= Roy Hellvin =

Norwegian pianist, composer, and arranger

- Born: Roy Wilhelm Hellvin; 9 January 1944 (age 82); Oslo, Norway
- Origin: Norway
- Genres: Jazz
- Occupations: Musician, composer, arranger
- Instrument: Piano

Roy Wilhelm Hellvin (born 9 January 1944) is a Norwegian pianist, composer, and music arranger, known from Oslo's theater and jazz scenes and from a series of recordings.

== Biography ==
Hellvin was born in Oslo. In 1961, still in his teens, he was leading his own band, and with Lucky Thompson, Carl Magnus Neumann, and Jesper Thilo, he attended the 1968 Kongsberg Jazzfestival. He released his debut solo album Roy Hellvin in 1975. Furthermore, he played with Bernt Anker Steen / Harald Bergersen Quintet, and was a part of 'Radiostorbandet' (1968–81) and collaborated on releases by Laila Dalseth (1976–80.

Hellvin has musical education from the Norwegian Academy of Music and the University of Oslo, and has been employee at Oslo Nye Teater (1976) as musical director and arranger for more than 60 productions. In addition he has collaborated on productions for Nationaltheatret, Det norske teatret, Riksteatret, Trøndelag Teater, Rogaland Teater, and Chat Noir. In the 1980s he played with Per Nyhaug Studioband as well as in lineups with Frode Thingnæs.

He leads his own Roy Hellvin Trio including Bjørn Jacobsen (bass) and Leif Osen (drums), releasing the album Old Friends in 2003). More recently, he has led a quartet with the same Osen, and Terje Johansen (trumpet) and Kåre Garnes (bass). Hellvin was awarded the 2001 Gammleng-prisen in the category Studio.

== Honors ==
- 2001: Gammleng-prisen in the category Studio

== Discography ==
=== Solo albums ===
- 1975: Roy Hellvin (Philips)

With Roy Hellvin Trio

- 2002: Old Friends (Curling Legs

=== Collaborations ===
With Erik Amundsen

- 1956: Erik Amundsen (Gemini Records)

With Bjarne Nerem

- 1962: Portrait Of A Norwegian Jazz Artist (Gemini Records)

With Erik Andresen

- 1970: Gip (Flower)

With Laila Dalseth

- 1978: Glad There Is You (Talent)

With Per Nyhaug Studioband

- 1984: Groovin' High (Gemini Records)

With Helge Hurum

- 2007: Spectre: The Unreleased Works 1971-1982 (Plastic Strip)

With Erling Wicklund

- 2007: Storeslem (Ponca Jazz Records), live at Lancelot
