= Atle Hammer =

Norwegian engineer and jazz musician (1932–2017)

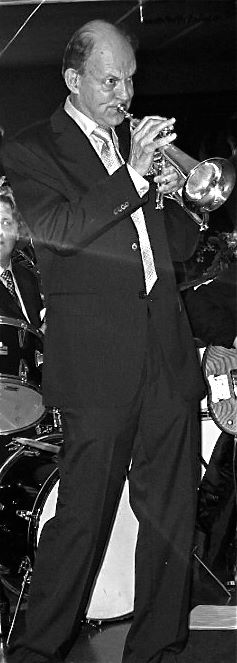

Background information
- Born: Atle Jonas Hammer; March 11, 1932 (age 94); Oslo, Norway
- Origin: Norway
- Died: October 22, 2017 (aged 85)
- Genres: Jazz
- Occupations: Musician, composer
- Instrument: Trumpet
- Formerly of: Atle Hammer Sexet
- Website: jdisc.columbia.edu/person/atle-hammer

Atle Jonas Hammer (11 March 1932 – 22 October 2017) was a Norwegian engineer and jazz musician (trumpet, Flugelhorn), central on the jazz scene in Oslo and known from several international cooperation.

== Biography ==
Hammer, raised at Røa, Oslo, is the son of a civil engineer Eivind Hammer and grandchild of Hans Gudbrand Hammer. He was trained as a civil engineer in the United States, and later worked at Norwegian State Railways and Jernbaneverket.

He established himself as a leading trumpeter in Norway in the 1950s, and led his own sextet releasing the album Seven Eleven (1954), with Erik Amundsen (bass). He also played with Kjell Karlsen's Orchestra, The Norwegian Big Band, Mikkel Flagstad's Quintet, and performed on Egil Kapstad's «Syner», among others, and collaborated with such jazz musicians as Laila Dalseth, Pepper Adams, George Russell, Red Holloway, Bjarne Nerem and James Moody.

From 1980-85 he led his own quintet with among others Terje Venaas (bass), Eivin Sannes (piano) and Tom Olstad (drums), and this was followed by a quintet with Harald Bergersen (saxophone), Erling Aksdal (piano, 1985–89). During the 1980s and 1990s he played in bands with Thorgeir Stubø, Per Husby Quintet, Magni Wentzel Quintet, and in Big Bands like the one led by Harald Gundhus/Ole Jacob Hansen and Erling Wicklund's «Storeslem».

Later, he led his own quartet with Rune Nicolaysen (saxophone), Freddy Hoel Nilsen (piano), Carl Morten Iversen (bass) and as a quintet including with Lars Erik Norum (drums). He was also a member of the ska band, The Phantoms.

== Honors ==
- 1986: The Reenskaug Award
- 2010: Asker Jazz Clubs Honor Award

== Discography ==
Atle Hammer Sextett

- 1954: Seven Eleven
- 1992: Arizona Blue (Gemini Records), with Egil «Bop» Johansen, Egil Kapstad, Jon Gordon, Red Holloway and Terje Venaas

With Egil Kapstad Choir & Orchestra

- 1968: Norsk Jazzforum Presents: Syner - Egil Kapstad Choir & Orchestra - Live at the Munch Museum, Oslo

With The Norwegian Big Band conducted by Kjell Karlsen

- 1976: Day In, Night Out - The Norwegian Big Band

With Egil Monn Iversen's Big Band

- 1985: Live At Gildevangen (Camp Records), featuring Sylfest Strutle

With The Norwegian Radio Big Band

- 1988: The Norwegian Radio Big Band Meets Bob Florence (Odin Records)
- 1988: The Norwegian Radio Big Band Meets Bill Holman (Taurus Records)

With Harald Bergersen

- 1988: Joy Spring (Gemini Records)
