= Fred Nøddelund =

Norwegian musician

- Born: 1 April 1947
- Died: 18 August 2016 (aged 69)
- Genres: Jazz
- Occupation(s): Musician, composer, music arranger
- Instrument: Flugelhorn

Fred Nøddelund (1 April 1947 – 18 August 2016) was a Norwegian jazz musician (Flugelhorn), music arranger, record producer and bandleader known from several recordings and performances. He was festival composer at Moldejazz at a young age (Atlantis, 1970). Moreover, he led the ensembles with the Oslo musicians Sture Janson, Svein Christiansen, and Knut Riisnæs.

== Honors ==
- 1982: Gammleng-prisen in the category studio musician
- 1983: Work of the year awarded by NOPA, for «Early winter morning»

== Album ==
- 2005: In the Shade of Sea (Tylden Records). Six pieces for flugelhorn and orchestra, with Aralsjøen. With contributions from Pete Knutsen and Jan Erik Kongshaug, and musicians from the symphony orchestra of Latvia, led by Terje Mikkelsen.

== Contributions ==
He has contributed on releases by the Christian rock group Good News from Ålesund (1971–75), as well as records by:

- 1973: Per Elvis Granberg: Real Rock'n'Roll
- 1975: Jan Eggum: Jan Eggum
- 1976: Einar Schanke: Nevergreen
- 1976: Radiostorbandet
- 1978: Erik Bye/Birgitte Grimstad: En Dobbel Deylighed,(music arrangements)
- 1978, 1985 and 1997: Trond-Viggo Torgersen
- 1978 Medvirkede på Iron Office LP "Ambience"
- 1981: Arvid Martinsen Big Band (musician)
- 1982: David Foster: Songwriter for the Stars (producer)
- 1982: Karin Krog: NRK sessions (from Club 7)
- 1982: Det Norske Kammerkor
- 1982: Dag Arnesen: Ny Bris
- 1983: Bjørn Eidsvåg: Passe Gal
- 1983: Pål Thowsen: (Sympathy)
- 1983: Jens Wendelboe: ( 'lone Attic)
- 1984: Graffiti Project
- 1985: Sigvart Dagsland: Joker
- 1985: Harald Heide-Steen Jr.: Sylfest Strutle, live at Gildevangen
- 1986: Melodi Grand Prix: (jury member and bandleader, 1986)
- 1992: Kristian Lindeman: (producer)

He has also conducted Asker Big Band and Kolsås Big Band.
