= Knut Riisnæs =

Norwegian jazz musician, arranger, and composer (1945–2023)

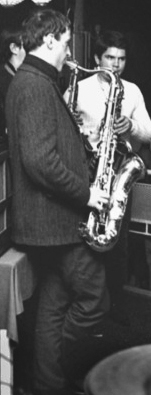

Background information
- Born: 13 November 1945; Oslo, Norway
- Died: 22 July 2023 (aged 77)
- Genres: Jazz
- Occupation: Musician
- Instrument: Saxophone

Knut Riisnæs (13 November 1945 – 22 July 2023) was a Norwegian jazz musician (saxophone and flute), arranger, and composer, son of pianist Eline Nygaard Riisnæs and brother of classical pianist Anne Eline Riisnæs (1951–) and jazz saxophonist Odd Riisnæs (1953–). The brothers are both known from a variety of recordings in Norway and internationally.

== Career ==
Knut Riisnæs was born in Oslo, where he became central to the local jazz scene at an early age. He contributed to the bebop inspired records released by some of the greatest jazz musicians of Norway, and made his solo debut with the album Escape, by Knut Borge characterized as "the basis of the Wizard John Coltrane ... by far the best Norwegian jazz production in 1982, besides New Cool Quartet". Ten years after he released jazz standards on the album Confessin', whereupon Stein Kagge said that "Riisnæs have signed up as successor to the great Norwegian tenor saxophonists like Arvid Gram Paulsen and Bjarne Nerem ...". After the third album with guitarist John Scofield and bassist Palle Danielsson, Knut Borge repeated his impressions from 1982: "I know a few tenorist in the world so confidently like Riisnæs have seized the saxophone phrases John Coltrane". The fourth album Touching was launched at the outdoor stage Blå, and bass player Arild Andersen referers that the Quartet "nursed an elastic expression with good grip on familiar dynamic effects".

Riisnæs worked with the leading Norwegian jazz musicians, like on Karin Krog (recording debut, 1966), Egil Kapstad (1967), Terje Rypdal (1968), Torgrim Sollid (Østerdalsmusikk, 1975), Ketil Bjørnstad (Leve Patagonia, 1978), Radka Toneff (1977), Laila Dalseth (1978), Pål Thowsen (1979), Kenneth Sivertsen (1985), Per Husby (1990), Bjørn Alterhaug (1991), Kjell Öhman (1993), with Jan Gunnar Hoff Group (1992–), Sigurd Ulveseth Trio (1993–), "Radiostorbandet" (1971–90), a big band led by Helge Hurum, Jens Wendelboe, Kjell Karlsen and Fred Nøddelund. From 2000, he has played with Helge Iberg, in "Sharp 9" (2004–), in a Quartet with Ivar Antonsen (piano), Terje Gewelt (bass) and Espen Rud (drums) (2004–), and in Ditlef Eckhoff Quintet.

Riisnæs toured with saxophone trio Petter Wettre and Frode Nymo (2005) initiated by Rikskonsertene, with material premiered at Kongsberg Jazz Festival 2004. The trio with Petter Wettre in the lead, released the album State of the Art (2005). Riisnæs played at Hurtigruten in 2007 and performed Bleak House with Terje Rypdal at Moldejazz the same year. In 2009 he was in the line-up with Tore Johansen Quartet and Håvard Stubø Quartet. In 2010 he was artist in residence at Jazznatt, contributed at Carl Størmer's JazzCode, and recorded an album with Lars Jansson, Mats Eilertsen and Carl Størmer.

== Death ==
Knut Riisnæs died on 22 July 2023, at the age of 77.

== Honors ==
- Norwegian government grant 1979
- Buddyprisen 1981
- Spellemannprisen 1982 in the class Jazz, for the record Flukt
- Spellemannprisen 1992 in the class Jazz, for the record Featuring Scofield and Danielsson
- Gammleng-prisen 1992

== Discography ==
- 1975: Nordic Jazz Quintet (Storyville, recorded 8 October 1974) with Jukka Tolonen (guitar), Ole Kock Hansen (piano), Kjell Jannson (bass), and Petur Östlund (drums).
- 1982: Flukt (Odin, 1982), awarded Spellemannprisen 1982, with Dag Arnesen (piano), Bjørn Kjellemyr (bass) and Jon Christensen (drums).
- 1991: Confessin' the blues (Gemini), with Red Holloway.
- 1992: Featuring John Scofield and Palle Danielsson (Odin Records), with Jon Christensen, awarded Spellemannprisen 1992 and Gammleng-prisen 1992.
- 2001: Touching (Resonant), compositions inspired by John Coltrane and Joe Henderson with Dag Arnesen (piano), Frank Jakobsen (drums) and Terje Gewelt (bass), nominated for Spellemannprisen.
- 2016: 2'nd Thoughts (Losen Records)
- 2018: The Kernel (Losen Records)

Awards
Preceded by Bjarne Nerem	Recipient of the Buddyprisen; 1981	Succeeded by Radka Toneff
Preceded by Thorgeir Stubø	Recipient of the Jazz Spellemannprisen; 1982	Succeeded by Masqualero
Preceded by Masqualero	Recipient of the Jazz Spellemannsprisen; 1992	Succeeded by Radka Toneff
Preceded by Kristian Bergheim	Recipient of the Jazz Gammleng-prisen; 1992	Succeeded by Bendik Hofseth
