= Erling Wicklund =

Norwegian musical artist (1944–2019)

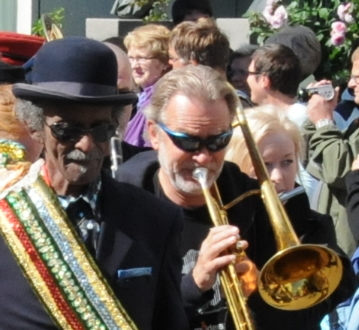
- Lionel Batiste and Erling Wicklund (right) at Moldejazz in 2010

Background information
- Born: Erling Sachs Wicklund; 7 June 1944; Gothenburg, Sweden
- Origin: Sweden
- Died: 8 August 2019 (aged 75)
- Genres: Jazz
- Occupations: Musician, radio host, music critic, composer and journalist
- Instrument: Trombone
- Label: Ponca Jazz Records
- Formerly of: Erling Wicklund's Storeslem; Geir Wentzel's Orchestra

Erling Sachs Wicklund (7 June 1944 – 8 August 2019) was a Norwegian jazz trombonist, composer, arranger and journalist, known for a series of jazz programs on NRK.

== Career ==
Wicklund was born in Gothenburg, Sweden, and studied musicology, art history and English at the University of Oslo, composition and arranging at "Dick Grove School of Music" in Los Angeles, and trombone at Musikkonservatoriet in Oslo. From the 1960s he played in "Veitvet Musikkskoles storband", "Universitetet i Oslos Storband", Filharmonisk Selskaps Orkester, orchestras at Chat Noir, Det Norske Teatret, Oslo Nye Teater, Nationaltheatret, "Thorleif Østerengs storband", "Radiostorbandet" as well as at Club 7, bands led by Arild Wikstrøm and Earl Wilson's "Band No Name". From 1968 he has been music producer and journalist at NRK. Radio host at NRK P2 and NRK Jazz. He is also the leader of his own bands "Storeslem", "Streetswingers", "Sixpack", "Take Five", "Trombone for Two". His newest band is the octet "Octopus".

While he led quintet "Oolyakoo" with Atle Hammer (trompet) from 1976. "Storeslem" was initiated in 1991, together with 16 professional musicians they released Wicklunds compositions in 2008. His trio "Streetswingers" with Jan Berger (guitar) and Erik Amundsen (bass) released the album About time (2001), and has subsequently varied the lineup with guitarists Bjørn Vidar Solli, Staffan William-Olsson, Frode Kjekstad, Halvard Kausland, and the bassist Stig Hvalryg. The sextet "Sixpack" with Atle Hammer, Harald Bergersen, Staffan William-Olsson, Stig Hvalryg and Lars Erik Norum held a concert at "Oslo Jazzfestival" 2007, presenting the world premiere of twelve compositions by Wicklund. The quintet "Take Five" has among others cooperated with saxophonist Håvard Fossum and pianist Ove Alexander Billington. In the quintet "Trombone for two" he participates with trombonist Harald A. Halvorsen and they performed several concerts in 2008. The octet "Octopus" plays originals by Wicklund as well as classics by Bill Holman, Marty Paich and Lars Gullin.

As a music producer and journalist at NRK, Wicklund is most famous for the programs "Norske jazzprofiler" and "Åpent hus", with several unique recordings from the Norwegian jazz scene Club 7 in the 1970s. He has produced numerous jazz concerts, festival reports and portraits, and in 1991 a TV series "Ung norsk jazz" at NRK with the producer Jan Horne. In the 90s he was the producer for "Midt i musikken", later jazz reviewer in "Kulturnytt" at NRK P2. From 2008 he served on the editorial board for 24-hour DAB and online channel NRK Jazz.

Several Wicklund radio productions are released on CD, like Radka Toneff Fairytales (1982), The Norwegian Radio Big Band meets Bob Florence (1986), The Norwegian Radio Big Band meets Bill Holman (1989), Jens Wendelboe's Crazy Energy Jazz Quartet Get crazy (1998), Kjell Karlsen Big Band Big Band Bonanza (2001), Hallgeir Pedersen Trio West Coast Blues (2002), Nora Brockstedt As Time Goes By (2004), The NRK Sessions – Soul, Afro-Jazz and Latin from the Club 7 Scene (2007), Christian Reim Unreleased works 1969–1979 (2008), Carl Magnus Neumann Live at Kongsberg and other unreleased works (2008), Helge Hurum Spectre The unreleased works 1971–1982, Svein Finnerud Trio Preachers The unreleased works 1969–1980 (2007), and Svein Finnerud Trio The Complete Released Works 1968–1999 (2008). He was also the producer for the last recording The end of a tune by guitarist Thorgeir Stubø.

As a child actor Wicklund contributed to over 100 NRK radio play for "Radioteatret", "Skolekringkastinga" and "Barnetimen", in the 1950s. He also had child roles at "Det Norske Teatret" and was the character "Henriks sønn" in Arne Skouen's Oscar nominated film Ni liv (1957).

== Honors ==
- 1974: Molderosen at Moldejazz
- 2014: Awarded the Norwegian King's Medal of Merit, Kongens Fortjenstmedalje

== Discography ==
- 2001: About time (Hot Club Records), with Streetswingers
- 2008: Erling Wicklund's Storeslem – Live at Lancelot (Ponca Jazz Records), with his own compositions and main soloists Atle Hammer and Harald Bergersen.

== Filmography ==
- 1957: Nine Lives - Henriks sønn
