= Kåre Garnes =

Norwegian jazz musician (born 1954)

- Born: 8 November 1954 (age 71); Bergen, Hordaland
- Origin: Norway
- Genres: Jazz
- Occupation: Musician
- Instrument: Upright bass
- Labels: Odin Records; Gemini Records
- Website: Kåre Garnes on Myspace

Kåre Garnes (born 8 November 1954 in Bergen, Norway) is a Norwegian jazz musician (upright bass), known for his collaborations with Bergen jazz legends like Dag Arnesen, Knut Kristiansen, Per Jørgensen, Olav Dale and Ole Thomsen, and in a series of Norwegian jazz bands.

== Career ==
From the mid-1970s he was a central figure on the Bergen jazz scene, and participated such within orchestras like Knut Kristiansen/Per Jørgensen Quintet 1979–80, Ny Bris and Steam 1980–83. He moved to Oslo in 1983, and there he collaborated with musicians such as Odd Riisnæs, Bjarne Nerem, Laila Dalseth and Per Husby.

In 2010–12 he has performed a series of gigs at Oslo jazz clubs with his own K. G. Trio including Svein Christiansen (drums) and Håkon Storm-Mathisen (guitar), and in the quintet "Changes" including Tom Olstad, Nils Jansen and Rune Klakegg.

== Discography ==
With Dag Arnesen

- 1982: Ny Bris (Odin Records), including Frank Jakobsen, Olav Dale, Ole Thomsen and Per Jørgensen

With Eli Storbekken

- 1989: Glimt (Hot Club Records)

With Bjarne Nerem

- 1987: More Than You Know (Gemini Records)
- 1988: Mood Indigo (Gemini Records)
- 2006: Embraceable You (Gemini Records), compilation

With Odd Riisnæs

- 1988: Speak Low (Taurus Records)
- 1990: Thoughts (Taurus Records)

With Nora Brockstedt

- 1990: Hilsen Nora (Benoni Records)

With Knut Kristiansen

- 1995: Monk Moods (Odin Records)

With Totti Bergh

- 1996: Warm Valley (Gemini Records)

With Vidar Johansen Trio

- 1997: Lopsided (Curling Legs)

Trio including Harald Gundhus and Tom Olstad

- 1999: Don't Drop the Bop (Gemini Records)

With Tom Olstad

- 2007: Changes – For Mingus (Ponca Jazz)
