= Sidsel Endresen =

Norwegian singer, composer, and actress (born 1952)

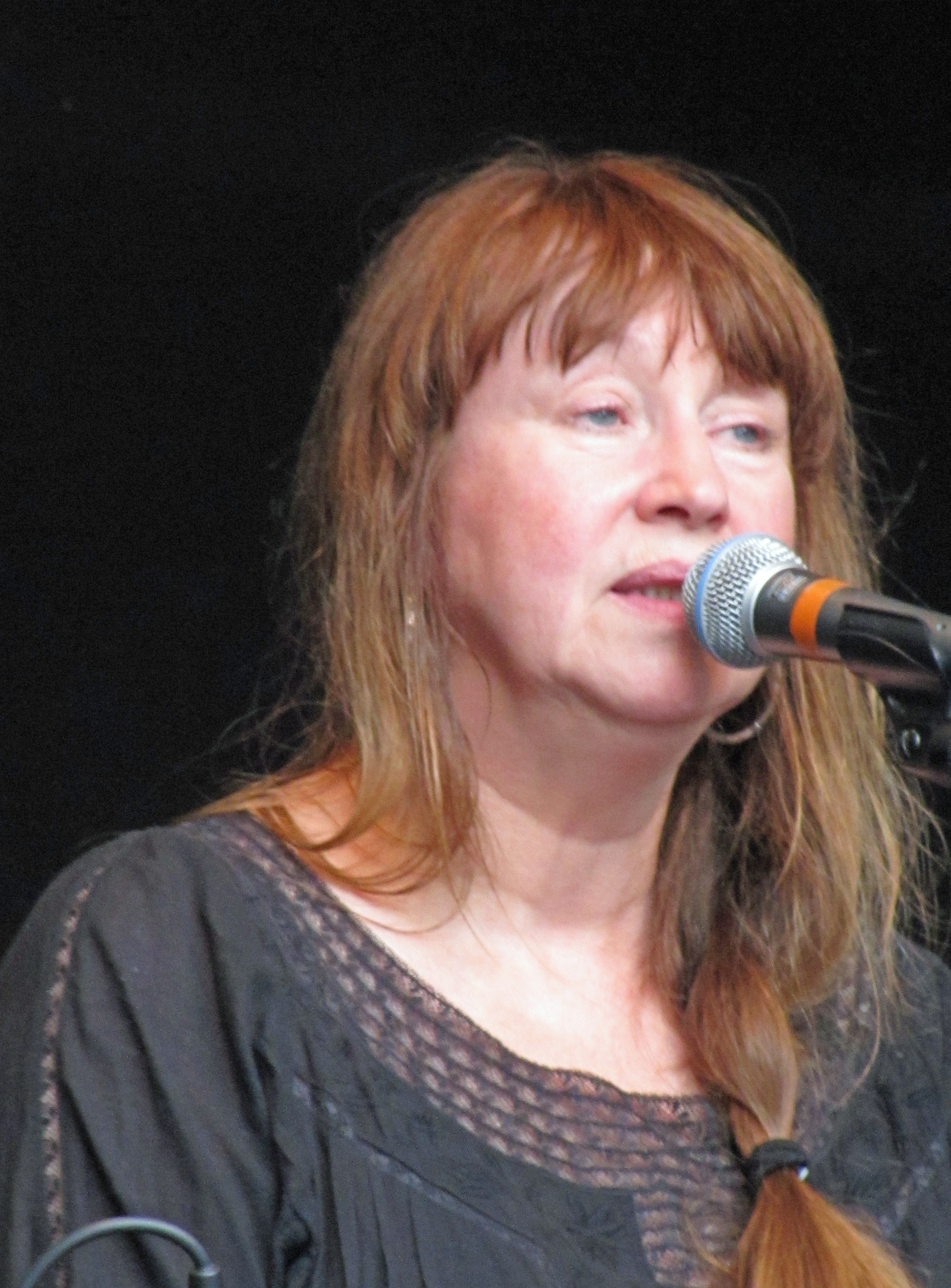
- Performing in Frankfurt am Main in 2010

Background information
- Born: 19 June 1952 (age 74); Norway
- Genres: Vocal
- Occupation: Singer
- Years active: 1980s–present
- Label: ECM
- Website: sidselendresen.com

Sidsel Endresen (born 19 June 1952) is a Norwegian singer, composer, and actress. She was part of the Jon Eberson group. Since 1987, Endresen has pursued a successful solo career, recording for ECM.

== Career ==
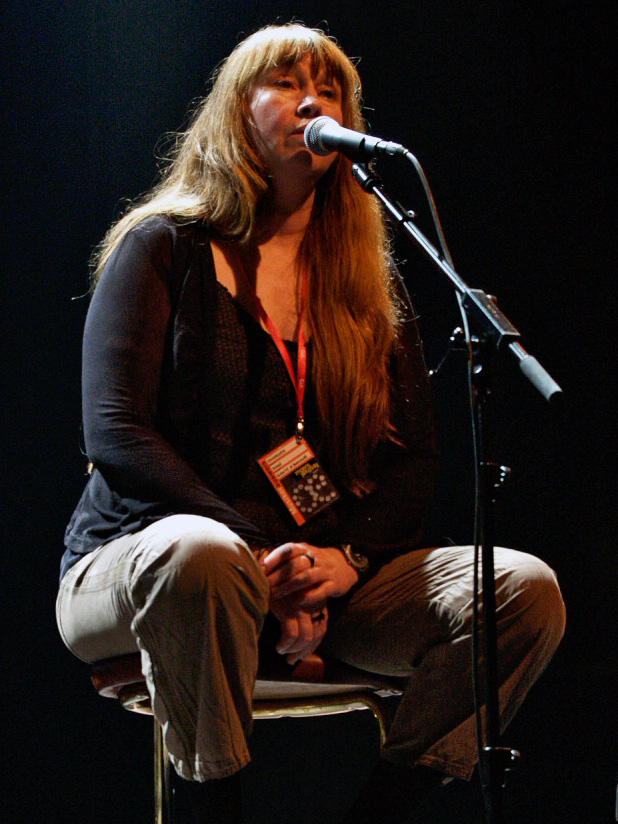
Sidsel Endresen

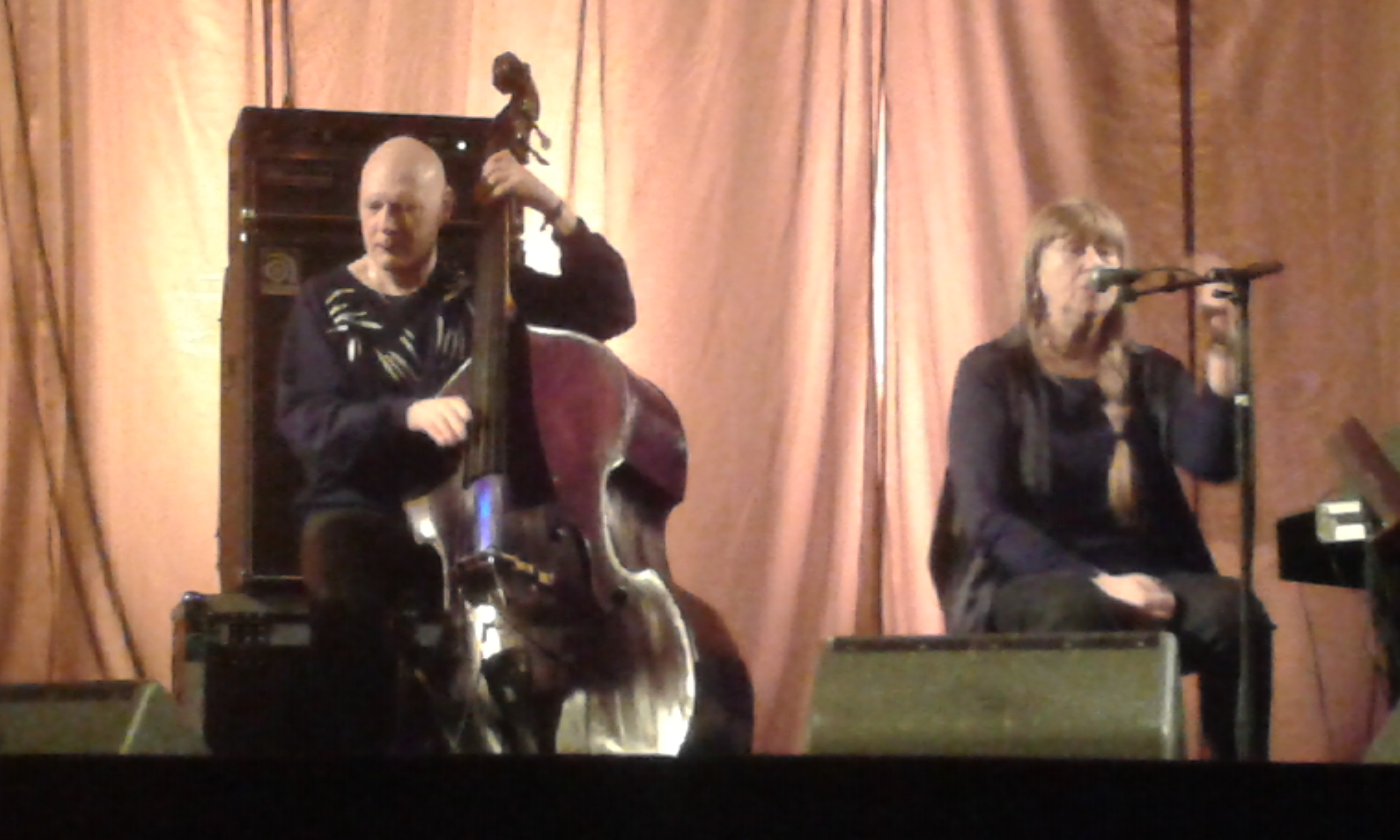
Endresen and Dan Berglund with Jazzland Night at Vossajazz 2016.

Endresen was one of the most prominent female jazz musicians in Norway in the beginning of the 21st century. She is a versatile artist, who likes to challenge her voice with new experimental forms and combination of jazz and other artistic expressions. Her work has moved from "fusion" and "chamber jazz" in the 1980s and 1990s, to improvisational "new" musical forms in the mid-1990s until today. She has also moved from larger formats to explore solo, duo and trio formats. The last 15 years have her work mainly been concentrated on the genre of free improvisation music, both as a performer and as composer.

Endresen studied English and anthropology and lived in the UK for a period until 1976, before settling in Oslo, where she started her artistic career.

She worked as a singer, composer and songwriter with soul group Chipahua (1979- ), and with the Jon Eberson Group (1980–87). With Eberson, she made a series of musically strong albums at the intersection between jazz and rock that were highly popular and acclaimed by a growing audience. The result of this cooperation was five celebrated CDs, awarded two times the Spellemannprisen.

Endresen and Stian Westerhus have been followed by new experimental Norwegian musicians like Natalie Sandtorv and Torgeir Standal in The Jist duo.

== Honors ==
- 1981: Spellemannprisen in the class Jazz rock, for the album Jive Talking
- 1985: Spellemannprisen in the class Sector award, as composer/lyricist, for the album City Visions
- 1991: Gammleng-prisen Open class, for the album So I Write
- 1993: Radka Toneff Memorial Award
- 1998: Spellemannprisen Open class, together with Bugge Wesseltoft, for the album Duplex Ride
- 1998: Kongsberg Jazz Award
- 2000: Buddyprisen
- 2002: Spellemannprisen Open class, together with Bugge Wesseltoft, for the album Out here in there
- 2012: Spellemannprisen in the class Jazz, together with Stian Westerhus, for the album Didymoi Dreams

== Discography ==
=== Solo albums ===
- 1990: So I Write (ECM Records), with Nils Petter Molvær, Django Bates & Jon Christensen
- 1994: Exile (ECM Records)
- 2000: Undertow (Jazzland Recordings)
- 2006: One (Sofa Music)
- 2008: Punkt Live Remixes vol. 1: Sidsel Endresen 7 Jon Hassel (Punkt)

With Bugge Wesseltoft

- 1994: Nightsong (ACT)
- 1998: Duplex Ride (ACT)
- 2002: Out here in there (Jazzland Recordings)

With Christian Wallumrød & Helge Sten

- 2004: Merriwinkle (Jazzland Recordings)

With Stian Westerhus

- 2012: Didymoi Dreams (Rune Grammofon)
- 2014: Bonita (Rune Grammofon)

=== Collaborations ===
Within Jon Eberson Group

- 1981: Jive Talking (CBS Records), awarded Spellemannprisen
- 1982: Polarities (CBS Records)
- 1984: City Visions (CBS Records)
- 1985: Stories (CBS Records), awarded Spellemannprisen
- 1987: Pigs and Poetry (CBS Records)

With Jon Balke

- 1998: Saturation (Jazzland Recordings/EmArcy)
- 2005: Statements (ECM Records), within Batagraf

With Nils Petter Molvaer

- 2001: Solid Ether (ECM Records)
- 2005: ER (Universal Records)
- 2006: an american compilation (Thirsty Ear)

With other projects

- 1995: Kullboksrytter (Curling Legs), with «Out To Lunch» & «Norwegian String Quartet»
- 2001: Different Rivers (ECM Records), with Trygve Seim
- 2002: ...The Rest Is Rumours (Curling Legs), with Pål Thowsen, Jon Eberson and Steinar Sønk Nickelsen feat. Endresen
- 2005: Sing Me Something (Fante Records), with «Ensemble du Verre»
- 2007: Crime Scenes (Punkt), at the Punkt Festival
- 2010: And Poppies from Kandahar (Samadhi Sound), with Jan Bang
- 2011: Ha! (Rune Grammofon), with Humcrush
- 2015: Debris in Lower Earth Orbit (Cusp Editions), with Twinkle³
- 2017: Hum (Confront Recordings), with Jan Bang

(See external links below for in-depth discography)

Awards
Preceded by No Jazz rock award	Recipient of the Jazz rock Spellemannprisen; 1981	Succeeded by No Jazz rock award
Preceded by No Open class award	Recipient of the Open class Gammleng-prisen; 1991	Succeeded by Anne Grete Preus
Preceded by First award in 1993	Recipient of the Radka Toneff Memorial Award; 1993	Succeeded by Kirsten Bråten Berg
Preceded by Nils Petter Molvær	Recipient of the Open class Spellemannprisen; 1998	Succeeded by Krøyt
Preceded by Bugge Wesseltoft	Recipient of the Kongsberg Jazz Award; 1998	Succeeded by Audun Kleive
Preceded by Totti Bergh	Recipient of the Buddyprisen; 2000	Succeeded by Jon Eberson
Preceded by Anja Garbarek	Recipient of the Open class Spellemannprisen; 2002	Succeeded by Niko Valkeapää
Preceded by Ola Kvernberg	Recipient of the Jazz Spellemannprisen; 2012	Succeeded by Karin Krog & John Surman
