= Svein Finnerud =

Norwegian jazz pianist and artist (1945–2000)

- Born: 2 June 1945; Oslo, Norway
- Died: 22 June 2000 (aged 55)
- Known for: Visual artist, musician

Svein Finnerud (2 September 1945 – 22 June 2000) was a Norwegian jazz pianist, painter and graphic artist.

== Career ==
Finnerud was educated at Statens håndverks- og kunstindustriskole (1967–72), under guidance of Chrix Dahl and had several exhibitions and has been purchased by Nasjonalgalleriet. He was known in Norwegian jazz circles in the 1960s, as part of the Knut Audum's Orchestra, where he played with guitarist and bassist Bjørnar Andresen. He established the free jazz band Finnerud Trio (1967–74), with Bjørnar Andresen and drummer Espen Rud. With their Paul Bley inspired musical expression, they played at a number of international jazz festivals, including Warsaw (1970). They released Svein Finnerud Trio (1969), Plastic sun (1970, Odin Records 1993) and Thoughts (1974/1984), and became known for his multi-media art forms of jazz and the visual arts, including working with Peter Opsvik and Carl Magnus Neumann, as well as Henie-Onstad Art Centre. The trio recorded the album Multimal (1971), a musical setting of poems by poet Trond Botnen. They also took part in the experimental works of Ketil Bjørnstad. In the 1990s the trio performed at Moldejazz 1993, and the year after released the album Travel Pillow, with Svein Christiansen as replacement on drums (from 1992), and played the Kongsberg Jazz Festival together with the band Close Erase (1997).

In his own name, Finnerud released the album Sounds and sights (2000), with contributions by Jon Eberson (guitar), Terje Gewelt (bass), Svein Christiansen (drums) and Nils Petter Molvær (trumpet), as well as his son Bendik Finnerud (piano). The album Egne hoder by Bjørnar Andresen/Paal Nilssen-Love (BP Records, 2000) has multiple inputs from, and dedications to, Finnerud. Furthermore, you will find the composition Ida Lupino, by the American composer Carla Bley on the Turning pages: Jazz in Norway 1960-70 (Norsk jazzarkiv, 2001).

== Works ==
- Graphic works to «M/S Royal Viking», «MS Kong Olav», «Deichmanske bibliotek» and Oregon State University

== Honors ==
- Rolf Stensersen's Grant 1972
- La coppa d'argento fra Ist. di San Paolo, Torino 1972
- «Statens arbeidsstipend» 1973–75
- Kråkerøy municipal Arisholmenstipend 1979

== Discography (in selection) ==
=== Solo album ===
- 2000: Sounds and Sights (Resonant)

=== As band leader ===
Within Svein Finnerud Trio

- 1969: Svein Finnerud Trio (Norsk jazzforum)
- 1970: Plastic Sun (Odin, 1993)
- 1971: Multimal (Polydor)
- 1984: Thoughts (Odin)
- 2008: The Complete Released Works 1968–1999 (Plastic Strip)
