= Songs About This and That =

Album by Karin Krog and John Surman

Songs about This and That

Studio album by Karin Krog and John Surman
- Released: 29 November 2013
- Recorded: 23–24 April 2013
- Studio: Rainbow Studio; Oslo, Norway
- Genre: Jazz
- Length: 44:53
- Label: Meantime
- Producer: John Surman, Karin Krog

John Surman chronology
| Saltash Bells (2012) | Songs about This and That (2013) | Invisible Threads (2018) |

Songs about This and That is a studio album by English saxophonist John Surman with Norwegian vocalist Karin Krog that was recorded over two days in April 2013 and released by Meantime on 29 November later that year.

== Background ==
Ten songs about "this and that" were commission by the duo for the Vossajazz festival in 2010, nine of which appear on this release.

Professional ratings
Review scores
| Source | Rating |
|---|---|
| The Guardian | 4/5 stars |

== Reception ==
In a 4-star review for The Guardian, Dave Gelly states: "These nine songs, jointly composed, bring out the special qualities of them both. Krog's apparently simple style has a clarity and precision that becomes more telling with the passage of time, while Surman never fails to surprise you with some new texture or sudden change of direction."

== Track listing ==
All tracks are written by John Surman & Karin Krog

| No. | Title | Length |
|---|---|---|
| 1. | "Mirror Song" | 1:37 |
| 2. | "Cherry Tree Song" | 6:12 |
| 3. | "Question Song" | 6:24 |
| 4. | "Circle Song" | 5:47 |
| 5. | "Happy Song" | 5:58 |
| 6. | "Moonlight Song" | 6:51 |
| 7. | "Rain Song" | 7:25 |
| 8. | "Pebble Song" | 6:02 |
| 9. | "Monk Song" | 5:09 |

== Personnel ==
- John Surman – soprano & baritone saxophones, bass clarinet, bass recorder
- Karin Krog – vocals
- Ivar Kolve – vibraphone
- Bjørn Klakegg – guitar, electronics
- Terje Gewelt – bass
- Tom Olstad – drums

== Credits ==
- Artwork & graphic design – Nina Regine Hjelle
- Producer – John Surman & Karin Krog
- Recording & Digital Mastering – Jan Erik Kongshaug
