= Resonant Music =

Norwegian jazz record label

Resonant Music is a jazz record label established in 1998 by Terje Gewelt in Oslo, Norway.

== Discography ==
- Dag Arnesen, Terje Gewelt and Svein Christiansen, Inner lines (RM 1-2, 1998)
- Terje Gewelt, Hide and seek (RM 2-2, 1999)
- Petter Wettre trio, Meet the locals (RM 3-2, 1999)
- Roy Powell trio, Holus (RM 4-2, 1999)
- Petter Wettre trio, In color (RM 5-2, 2000)
- Svein Finnerud, Sounds and sights (RM 6-2, 2000)
- Ahmad Mansour, Apples and oranges (RM 7-2, 2001)
- Knut Riisnæs, Touching (RM 8-2, 2001)
- Rob Waring trio, Synchronize your watches (RM 9-2, 2001)
- Terje Gewelt, Duality (RM 10-2, 2002)
- Ahmad Mansour, Nightlight (RM 11-2, 2002)
- Diverse, Sampler (RM 12-2, 2002)
- Terje Gewelt, Interplay (RM 13-2, 2003)
- Terje Gewelt, Small world (RM 14-2, 2004)
- Jørn Øien trio, Short stories (RM 15-2, 2004)
- Terje Gewelt, Hope (RM 16-2, 2005)
- Dag Arnesen trio, Norwegian song (RM 17-2, 2007)
- Terje Gewelt, If time stood still (RM 18-2, 2007)
- Espen Rud, Melancholy delight (RM 19-2, 2008)
- Dag Arnesen, Norwegian song 2 (RM 20-2, 2008)
- Terje Gewelt, Enrico Pieranunzi and Anders Kjellberg, Oslo (RM 21-2, 2009)
- Terje Gewelt, Azure (RM 22-2, 2010)
- Terje Gewelt, Selected works (RM 23-2, 2011)
