= Odd Riisnæs =

Norwegian jazz saxophonist and composer

- Born: 12 May 1953 (age 73); Oslo, Norway
- Genres: Jazz
- Occupations: Musician, composer
- Instrument: Saxophone
- Labels: Curling Legs; Odin Records; Ponca Jazz Records
- Website: www.oddriisnaes.com

Odd Riisnæs (born 12 May 1953) is a Norwegian jazz musician (saxophone) and composer. He was born in Oslo, Norway, the son of pianist Eline Nygaard Riisnæs and the younger brother of jazz saxophonist Knut Riisnæs. He is known from a series of releases and cooperations with the likes of Dag Arnesen, Arve Henriksen, Kjell Karlsen, Geir Lysne, Iver Kleive, Nils Petter Molvær, Jon Eberson, Terje Gewelt, Jon Balke, Audun Kleive and Oslo 13

== Career ==
Riisnæs was in different orchestras led by Terje Lie, Paul Weeden, Ditlef Eckhoff, Richard Badendyck, Per Husby, Ole Jacob Hansen and Harald Gundhus, Dag Arnesen, Jens Wendelboe, Kjell Karlsen and Jan Harrington. In the 1980s he played with the bands "Kråbøl", Oslo 13, "Radiostorbandet", "Lille Frøen Saksofonkvartett" and Dag Arnesen quintet.

Riisnes released two albums as a leader of Odd Riisnæs Quartett, with Dag Arnesen (piano), Tom Olstad (drums) and Kåre Garnes (bass). Even more releases came with Odd Riisnæs Project and the musicians Pål Thowsen (drums), Bjørn Kjellemyr (bass) and Steinar Larsen (guitar). Riisnæs has also been associated with Norges Musikkhøgskole as a lecturer in aural training.

== Utgivelser ==
=== Solo albums ===
As Odd Riisnæs Quartet with Dag Arnesen

- 1987: Speak low (Taurus Records)
- 1990: Thoughts (Taurus Records)

As Odd Riisnæs Project

- 1993: Another version (Taurus Records), with Iver Kleive (keyboards), Steinar Larsen (guitar), Terje Gewelt (Taurus Records) and Tom Olstad
- 1996: Your ship (1996)
- 2003: Another breeze (Hot Club Records, 2003), with guest artists like Sigmund Thorp and Jorunn Lovise Husan
- 2008: Another road (Ponca Jazz Records)

=== As sidemann ===
With Per Eriksen

- 2000: Beat Crazy (Curling Legs)
- 2007: Beat Repeat (Curling Legs)

With others

- 1983: Anti-Therapy (Odin Records), with Oslo 13
- 2004: That's All (Jazzavdelingen), with Richard Badendyck
