= Guttorm Guttormsen =

Norwegian jazz musician, arranger and composer

- Guttormsen with Scheen Jazzorkester, 2026

Background information
- Born: 28 June 1950 (age 76); Mo i Rana, Norway
- Genres: Jazz
- Occupations: Composer, conductor, musician
- Instruments: Flute, saxophone
- Years active: 1971-present

Guttorm Guttormsen (born 28 June 1950) is a Norwegian Jazz musician (flute, clarinet, alto saxophone), arranger and composer.

== Career ==
Guttormsen was born in Mo i Rana. After moving to Oslo (1969), he appeared with Ivar Antonsen's Band at «Festspillene i Nord-Norge» (1971). Later, at Skien, he led a big band, and led his own quintet with, among others, Bjørn Kjellemyr with a series of recordings. He attended Kongsberg Jazzfestival several times, also with his own quartet (1975, 1979), and «Guttorm Guttormsen/Per Kristian Ekholt Big Band» (1976). He led his own Quintet, including with Lars Klevstrand, Jon Balke, Carl Morten Iversen, Espen Rud, releasing the album Høysang (1978).

Musical Director of «Teater Ibsen» and within Jon Eberson Quartet, Per Husby dedication orchestra (1984–1988) and contributed on albums by «Trio de Janeiro», and the release Distant Reports (2001) by «Nordnorsk Jazzforum».

He is best known for his compositions for theater, including a variety of performances at Nationaltheatret, «Det Norske Teater» and «Teater Ibsen» where he is music director.

He was also the director of "Ibsens Gåte" in 1997 which was a musical interpretation of Ibsen.

Guttormsen has composed music for a number of Norwegian artists like Anne Grimstad Fjeld, Agnes Buen Garnås, Knut Buen, Lars Vik (Fritjof Fomlesen), Kine Hellebust to mention some. He has been a studio musician for a number of Norwegian music productions and artists like Lars Klevstrand.

He lives in Langesund since 1993. His stepdaughter Emilia Roosmann is an actress.

== Honors ==
- Buddyprisen 1979
- «Rana kommunes kulturpris» 1987
- «Telemark fylkes kulturpris» 1989
- «Hydroprisen» 1990
- «Skien bys medal» 1991
- «Bamble kommunes kulturpris» 2001
- «GS Bankens tiltakspris» 2001

Other

- «Bamble kommunes restaureringspris » 2004 with his wife Elisabeth Guttormsen

== Discography ==
=== Solo albums ===
- Soturnudi (MAI, 1975), with Brynjulf Blix, Carl Morten Iversen & Espen Rud

=== As band leader ===
- Albufeira, Guttorm Guttormsen Kvartett, 1979
- 10år, Guttormsen/Ekholt Storband, 1980
- Both albums were re-released in 2008, in remastered editions.

=== Collaborative works ===
- Høysang, Guttorm Guttormsen and Lars Klevstrand, 1977
- Riv ned gjerdene), Guttorm Guttormsen and Lars Klevstrand, 1976

=== Produsent ===
- Samme jord Kine Hellebust, 1993

== Compositions ==
=== Theater ===
According to aintervju på Riksteaterets sider, Guttormsen has composed music for more than 200 plays.

- Draumens hjarte, Grenland Friteater, 2004
- No Doctor for the Dead, Grenland Friteater, 2004
- Peer Gynt i Grenland, Grenland Friteater, Teater Ibsen og Kinesiske dansere, 2004
- Peer Gynt (培尔·金特), Grenland Friteater, Teater Ibsen og Fan Theatre, 2004, som 顾特姆·顾特姆森
- Salome, New Theater, Yale U., New Haven, Connecticut, USA, 2003
- Peer Gynt, Grenland Friteater og Teater Ibsen, 2003 (På oppdrag for Mo Hornmusikk arranger for janitsjarkorps i 2007)
- 1900. Maskespill og Maskefall, Den Nationale Scene, 2002
- Gullhjelmen, Teater Ibsen, 2002
- Harde tak, Grenland Friteater, 2002?
- Pinocchio, Det Norske Teatret, 2001
- Ole Brumm, Centralteateret, 2001
- Å være død er for lettvint, Grenland Friteater, 2001
- Fomlesens ferie, Grenland Friteater, 2000
- Dopa Lax, Grenland Friteater, ????
- Gode tider - for de onde, Grenland Friteater, ????
- Den innbildt syke, Grenland Friteater, 1999
- Høyt sill, Grenland Friteater og Riksteatret, 1999
- Riksgjøglerne, Grenland Friteater og Riksteatret, 1999
- Goldbergvariasjoner, Nationaltheatret, 1997
- En rosenkål for mye, Grenland Friteater (1996)
- Slangehud, Nationaltheatret, 1995
- Smuglere, Grenland Friteater, 1995
- Kirsebærtreet blomstrer i mai, Nationaltheatret, 1995
- Blue is the Smoke of War, Grenland Friteater, 1994
- Naar vi døde vaagner, Nationaltheatret, 1994
- Sarah Bernhardt, Nationaltheatret, 1987
- Jomfruer - Eller lengselsens geografi, Nationaltheatret, 1986
- Trojanerrinner, Nationaltheatret, 1984
- Det er ikke mitt bord, Den Nationale Scene, 1978

=== Musicals ===
- Musikken berget i det blå, Teater Ibsen, 2005
- Predikanten, Teater Ibsen, 2004
- Billenes Bryllup, Telemark Kammerorkester, 2001

=== Operas ===
- Fævlane Veit - en bakgårds opera Grenland friteater, 2005-2007
- Olaf Liljekrans, Teater Ibsen, 1983

=== Film ===
- Frihetens Pris, Terje Bomann-Larsen, 1989

=== Plays ===
- Marispelet, Styret for Marispelet, 2005-

== Concerts ==
- Jazz ved Havet, 2006

Awards
| Preceded by Kristian Bergheim | Recipient of the Buddyprisen; 1979 | Succeeded by Bjarne Nerem |
