= Buddyprisen =

Norwegian jazz musician award

Buddyprisen (established 1956 in Oslo, Norway) is an award, given annually by the Norwegian Jazz Forum to a Norwegian jazz musician that has "been an excellent performer and significantly involved in Norwegian jazz by other means".

The award was accompanied by a statue portraiting the New Orleans trumpeter Buddy Bolden, made by visual artist Lise Frogg. From 1987, recipients have received a travel grant; in 2011, the grant amounted to NKR 50,000.

The awards ceremony takes place at the club "Bare Jazz" in Oslo.

In 2009, the prize was awarded at "Dokkhuset" in Trondheim.

== List of Buddy Award winners ==
- 1956: Rowland Greenberg
- 1957: Arvid Gram Paulsen
- 1958: Einar Iversen
- 1959: –
- 1960: Mikkel Flagstad
- 1961: Erik Amundsen
- 1962: Bjørn Johansen
- 1963: –
- 1964: Øistein Ringstad
- 1965: Karin Krog
- 1966: –
- 1967: Jon Christensen
- 1968: Jan Garbarek
- 1969: Arild Andersen
- 1970: Frode Thingnæs
- 1971: Carl Magnus Neumann
- 1972: Asmund Bjørken
- 1973: –
- 1974: –
- 1975: Bjørn Alterhaug
- 1976: Laila Dalseth
- 1977: Egil Kapstad
- 1978: Kristian Bergheim
- 1979: Guttorm Guttormsen
- 1980: Bjarne Nerem
- 1981: Knut Riisnæs
- 1982: Radka Toneff
- 1983: Terje Bjørklund – Knut Kristiansen – Espen Rud
- 1984: Jon Balke
- 1985: Terje Rypdal
- 1986: Thorgeir Stubø
- 1987: Tore Jensen
- 1988: Carl Morten Iversen – Terje Venaas
- 1989: Per Husby
- 1990: John Pål Inderberg
- 1991: Stein Erik Tafjord
- 1992: Morten Gunnar Larsen
- 1993: Egil Johansen
- 1994: Bjørn Kjellemyr
- 1995: Per Jørgensen
- 1996: –
- 1997: Ole Jacob Hansen
- 1998: Magni Wentzel
- 1999: Totti Bergh
- 2000: Sidsel Endresen
- 2001: Jon Eberson
- 2002: –
- 2003: Nils Petter Molvær
- 2003: Honorary Award Buddy to Petter Pettersson
- 2004: Bugge Wesseltoft
- 2005: Arve Henriksen
- 2006: Paal Nilssen-Love
- 2007: Jon Larsen
- 2008: Frode Gjerstad
- 2009: Dag Arnesen
- 2010: Karl Seglem
- 2011: Eldbjørg Raknes
- 2012: Tore Brunborg
- 2013: Jan Gunnar Hoff
- 2014: Erlend Skomsvoll
- 2015: Håkon Kornstad
- 2016: Live Maria Roggen
- 2017: Audun Kleive
- 2018: Ingebrigt Håker Flaten
- 2019: Ståle Storløkken

== See also ==
- Music award
