= Dag Arnesen =

Norwegian jazz pianist (born 1950)

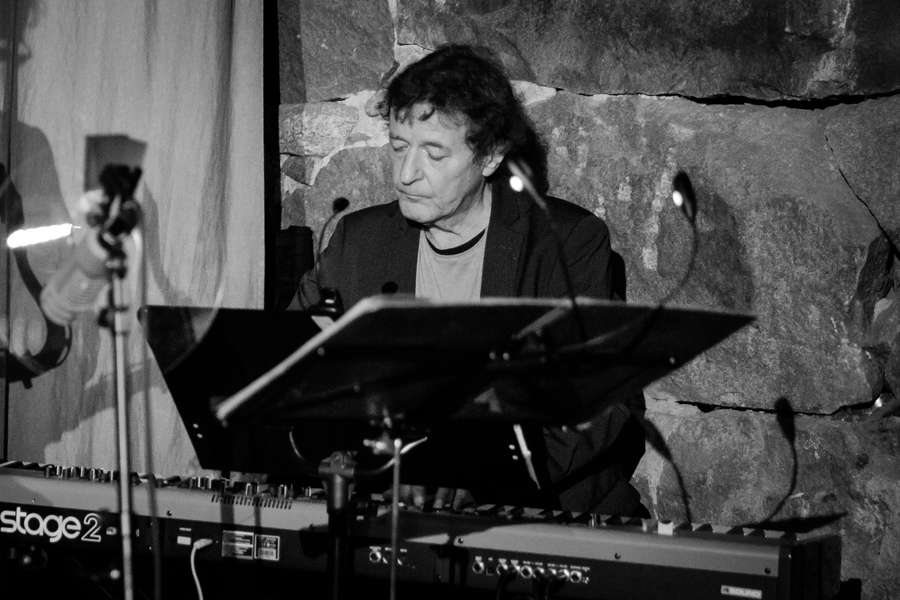
- In 2017

Background information
- Born: Dag Syver Arnesen; 3 May 1950 (age 76); Bergen, Hordaland, Norway
- Genres: Jazz
- Occupations: Musician, composer
- Instrument: Piano
- Website: www.mulemusic.no/dag/1.html

Dag Syver Arnesen (born 3 May 1950) is a Norwegian jazz pianist with a series of album releases.

== Career ==
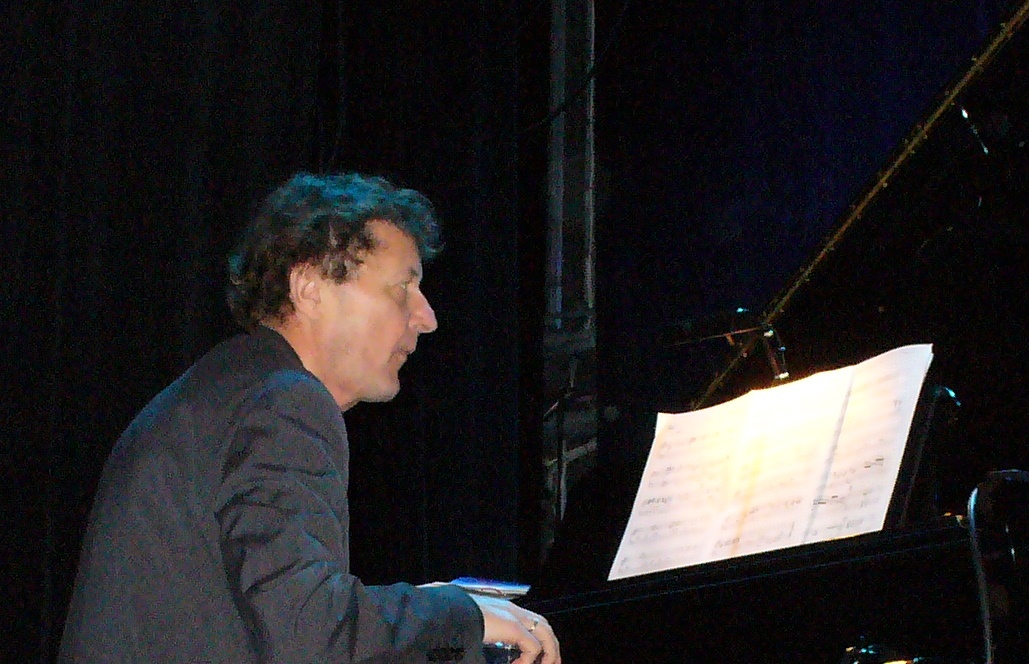
Arnesen with BBB in 2014.

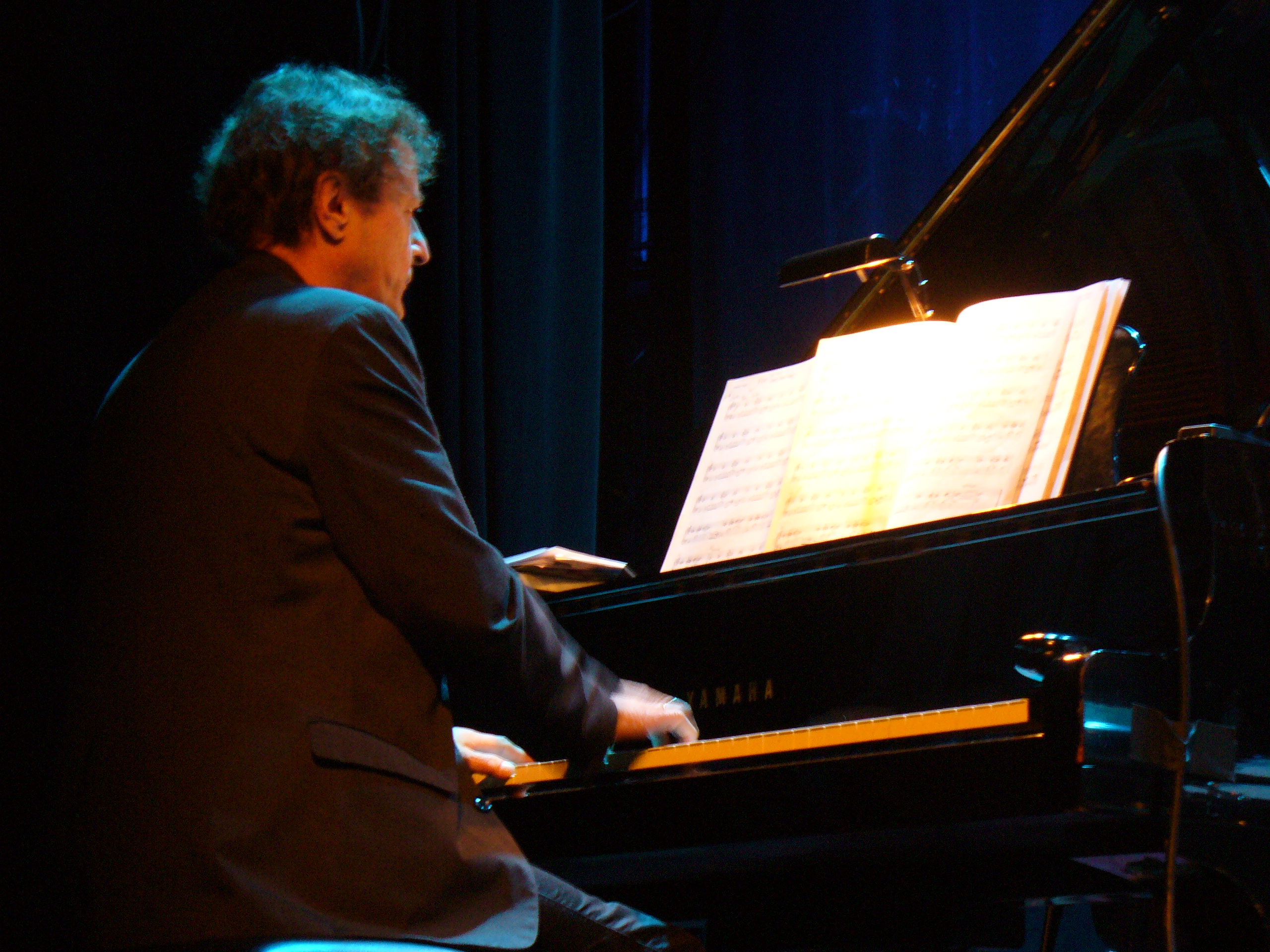
Arnesen and Bergen Big Band in November 2014.

Arnesen was born in Bergen, and studied classical piano under Jiri Hlinka at the Bergen Music Conservatory and got a commitment by Den Nationale Scene. Eventually he went to jazz and played in the 1970s with the Arvid Genius' orchestra, and led his own Trios, Quartets and Septetter og 13'tets. There were several records under his own name and he is still in the Bergen Big Band. Arnesen has also lived in Oslo and played in the jazz bands Søyr, Orleysa, various groups led by Norwegian guitarist Thorgeir Stubø, vocalist Susanne Fuhr, saxophonists Knut Riisnæs and Odd Riisnæs and orchestra leader Kjell Karlsen. In the Bergen-based Sigurd Ulveseth Quartet he has participated on three releases, and Arnesen also led the local Evans Jazzclub.

His melodic style has been compared to Jan Johansson.

== Honors ==
- 2014: Gammleng Award category Jazz
- 2009: Buddyprisen, awarded at Dokkhuset in Trondheim.
- 2003: Sildajazz Prize
- 1994: The Grieg Prize
- 1993: NOPA work of the Year Prize for Rusler rundt 152
- 1992: Vossajazzprisen
- 1982: Reenskog jazz Award

== Discography ==
An asterisk (*) indicates that the year is that of release.

Year recorded	Title	Label	Personnel/Notes
1982*	Ny Bris	Odin	With Olav Dale (sax), Per Jørgensen (trumpet), Ole Thomsen (guitar), Kåre Garnes (bass), Frank Jakobsen (drums)
1987*	Speak Low	Taurus	With Odd Riisnæs (tenor sax), Kåre Garnes (bass), Tom Olstad (drums)
1989*	Renascent	Odin	With Bjørn Kjellemyr (bass), Svein Christiansen (drums)
1990	The Day After	Taurus	With Odd Riisnæs (tenor sax, soprano sax), Bjørn Kjellemyr (bass), Svein Christiansen (drums), Wenche Gausdal (vocals)
1992*	Photographs	Taurus	Quartet, with Terje Gewelt (bass), Svein Christiansen (drums), Wenche Gausdal (vocals)
1994*	Movin'	Taurus	Trio, with Terje Gewelt (bass), Svein Christiansen (drums)
1996*	Rusler rundt Grieg	NOPA NN	With 13-piece orchestra
1998	Inner Lines	Resonant	Trio, with Terje Gewelt (bass), Svein Christiansen (drums)
2004	Time Enough	Resonant	Trio, with Terje Gewelt (bass), Pål Thowsen (drums)
2006	Norwegian Song 1	Resonant	Trio, with Terje Gewelt (bass), Pål Thowsen (drums)
2008	Norwegian Songs 2	Resonant	Trio, with Terje Gewelt (bass), Pål Thowsen (drums)
2010	Norwegian Songs 3	Losen	Quartet, with Ellen Andrea Wang (bass), Pål Thowsen (bass), Palle Mikkelborg (trumpet, flugelhorn, beatboxing)
2015*	Grieg, Tveitt & I	Losen	With Ole Marius Sandberg (bass), Ivar Thormodsæter (drums, percussion), strings
2016	Pentagon Tapes	Losen	Trio, with Ole Marius Sandberg (bass), Ivar Thormodsæter (drums)

== See also ==
- List of jazz pianists

Awards
Preceded by Per Jørgensen	Recipient of the Vossajazzprisen; 1992	Succeeded by Ole Hamre
Preceded by Svein Olav Herstad	Recipient of the Sildajazzprisen; 2003	Succeeded by Alf Wilhelm Lundberg
Preceded by Frode Gjerstad	Recipient of the Buddyprisen; 2009	Succeeded by Karl Seglem
Preceded by Olga Konkova	Recipient of the Jazz class Gammleng-prisen; 2014	Succeeded by Jaga Jazzist
