= Einar Iversen =

Norwegian jazz pianist and composer (1930–2019)

- Born: 27 July 1930; Mandal, Vest-Agder, Norway
- Died: 3 April 2019 (aged 88)
- Genres: Jazz
- Occupation: Musician
- Instrument: Piano
- Label: Ponca Jazz
- Website: poncajazzrec.no/iversen

Einar "Pastor'n" Iversen (27 July 1930 – 3 April 2019) was a Norwegian jazz pianist and composer and the son of a "pastor." He went into jazz after World War II ended. For more than sixty years, he played with everyone in Norwegian jazz.

== Career ==
Iversen was raised in Oslo where he studied classical piano under Inge Rolf Ringnes, Artur Schnabel and Finn Mortensen, and quickly established himself at the Oslo jazz scene (1949). He released his first album with Rowland Greenberg's orchestra (1953), and became one of the most respected Norwegian jazz musicians, awarded Buddyprisen (1958).

He played in a number of theaters, with Dizzy Gillespie at Birdland (1952), on the America Boat with Anthony Ortega (1954) and Modern Jazz Quartet (1955), and was a regular pianist at Metropol Jazz Club, where he played with jazz greats such as Dexter Gordon (1962), Coleman Hawkins (1963), Johnny Griffin (1964), and with Svend Asmussen and Stuff Smith in Sweden 1965. He recorded an album with his own trio (Me and My Piano 1967, reissued 2010). He co-operated with Swedish Putte Wickman and Monica Zetterlund, and Povel Ramel on tour in 1978. In Norway, he participated in a number of releases with Bjarne Nerem, Egil Johansen, Totti Bergh, Nora Brockstedt and Ditlef Eckhoff.

He led his own "E. I. Trio" with Tor Hauge (bass) and Jon Christensen (drums). They released Norway's first jazz trio recording, Me and my piano in 1967, "Ponca Jazz Records" 2005), containing Jazz standards. On "Gemini Records" he released the album Jazz på norsk (1990), Who can I turn to (1991), Portrait of a norwegian jazz artist – Einar Iversen (2001), and Seaview ("Hazel Records", 2001) With Tine Asmundsen (bass) and Svein Christiansen (drums). Iversen's recent works have been published in Twelve compositions ("Norsk jazzforlag", 2005). He died on 3 April 2019, aged 88.

== Honors ==
- Buddyprisen 1958
- Knight of First Class of the Order of the St. Olavs
- Gammleng-prisen in the class Veterans in 1997

== Compositions ==
- Twelve Compositions, music by Einar Iversen, ISBN 82-92521-04-6 ISMN M-706695-05-1

== Selected discography ==
=== Solo albums ===
- 1967: Me and my piano (Ponca Jazz Records, 2005), "E. I. Trio" including Tor Hauge & Jon Christensen
- 2001: Seaview (Hazel Records), trio" including Tine Asmundsen & Svein Christiansen
- 2001: Einar Iversen

== Collaborative works ==
- 2007 About Time (Hazel Jazz HJ4), with Lill Holen

== Notes ==
Awards
Preceded by Arvid Gram Paulsen	Recipient of the Buddyprisen; 1958	Succeeded by Mikkel Flagstad
Preceded by Torstein Grythe	Recipient of the Veteran class Gammleng-prisen; 1997	Succeeded by Harry Kvebæk
