= Gunnar Nilson (jazz musician) =

Gunnar Nilson (September 2, 1925 – December 12, 1989), known in Sweden by the moniker Siljabloo, was a Swedish jazz singer and clarinetist. He was one of the few male singers in the jazz genre to achieve success in Sweden.

== Life and career ==
Born in Luleå, Sweden on September 2, 1925, Gunnar Nilson began his career performing in amateur bands in Norrbotten County. He moved to Stockholm where he eventually became a founding member of the professional vocal group Flickery Flies with whom he performed from 1947 through 1951. While performing with Carl-Henrik Norin's band from 1952 to 1955 he earned the moniker "Siljabloo" due to the popularity of his bop-inspired vocal improvisations in the song "Sil-ja-bloo" which he recorded with Norin in 1953. He recorded two of his own albums with Odeon Records:, Siljabloo Is Back (1969) and That's My Desire (1971). In 1979 he recorded the jazz standard "If You Could See Me Now" on Sven-Åke Johansson's 1979 album Monday Date.

Nilson died in Örebro, Sweden on December 12, 1989.
