= Roy Powell (musician) =

British jazz pianist

Roy Powell (born 2 October 1965 in Langham, Rutland) is a British jazz pianist.

== Biography ==
His mother, Joan Powell, was a social historian. His father was a scientist who moved the family from Rutland to Canada. When Powell was ten, the family returned to England, settling in Hayfield, Derbyshire. He had been playing piano for five years after receiving lessons from his father. He attended New Mills Grammar School at the same time as Lloyd Cole. In the 1970s, when other teenagers were listening to The Clash and The Sex Pistols, Powell was listening to Duke Ellington and Miles Davis and buying albums through the mail from America. He attended the Royal Northern College of Music, studying piano and classical composition during the day and playing in Manchester jazz clubs at night. In 1992 he was a member of the Creative Jazz Orchestra. Three years later he moved to Norway.

Powell has been a member of the group InterStatic with Jacob Young, and Jarle Vespestad, and the group Naked Truth with Lorenzo Feliciati, Pat Mastelotto, and Graham Haynes. He recorded the album Mumpbeak with Feliciati, Mastelotto, Bill Laswell, Tony Levin, and Shanir Ezra Blumenkranz. On the album Powell plays Hohner Clavinet through guitar effect pedals and amps. In 2024 he toured and recorded with "This Celestial Engine".

== Discography ==
- A Big Sky (Totemic, 1994)
- Holus (Resonant, 1999)
- North by Northwest (Nagel Heyer, 2001)
- Solace (Nagel Heyer, 2003)
- Peak Experience Trio (Totemic, 2006)
- Rendezvous: Live in London (Nagel Heyer, 2007)
- Anthem (PVY, 2011)
- Naked Truth, Shizaru (RareNoise, 2011) – with Cuong Vu, Lorenzo Feliciati and Pat Mastelotto
- Holy Abyss (Cuneiform, 2012)
- InterStatic, InterStatic (RareNoise, 2012) – with Jacob Young and Jarle Vespestad
- Naked Truth, Ouroboros (RareNoise, 2012) – with Graham Haynes, Lorenzo Feliciati and Pat Mastelotto
- Mumpbeak, Mumpbeak (RareNoise, 2013) – with Bill Laswell, Tony Levin, Pat Mastelotto, Shanir Blumenkrantz and Lorenzo Feliciati
- InterStatic, Arise (RareNoise, 2014)
- Naked Truth, Avian Thug (RareNoise, 2016)
- Mumpbeak, Tooth (RareNoise, 2017) – rec. 2016 with Lorenzo Feliciati and Torstein Lofthus
- This Celestial Engine, This Celestial Engine (Discus Music, 2024) – with Dave Sturt and Ted Parsons
