= Kristian Bergheim =

Norwegian saxophonist

- Born: 6 June 1926; Bærum, Norway
- Died: 30 May 2010 (aged 83)
- Occupation: saxophonist
- Instrument: Tenor saxophone
- Years active: 1944–1990
- Labels: Gemini Records

Kristian Bergheim (6 June 1926 – 30 May 2010) was a noted saxophonist, considered one of the few in Norway of international caliber.

== Biography ==
Bergheim was born and spent most of his life in Bærum; he was brought up in Asker and in Stabekk. He played in a number of bands and orchestras before devoting his professional life to music, in 1948. He was repeatedly named best Norwegian saxophonist when such contests were common in the 1950s and 1960s.

He led his own bands and orchestras starting in 1960, focusing mostly on swing. He won the highest Norwegian jazz award, Buddyprisen, in 1978 and the Gammleng-prisen in 1991. Because of a lung ailment, he retired in 1990.

Bergheim was for some time married to noted singer and actress Anita Thallaug.

== Honors ==
- 1978: Buddyprisen
- 1991: Gammlengprisen in the class Jazz

== Discography ==
- Jazz in Norway, volume 1 (RCA, 1954)
- Arvid Gram Paulsen, Mikkel Flagstad, Kristian Bergheim (1977, Herman)
- Liva at Malla, (1977, Norjazz)
- Rainbow Session - vol 2, with Bjarne Nerem, Kristian Bergheim (1990) OCP 101-2

Awards
Preceded by Egil Kapstad	Recipient of the Buddyprisen; 1978	Succeeded by Guttorm Guttormsen
Preceded by Terje Rypdal	Recipient of the Jazz Gammleng-prisen; 1991	Succeeded by Knut Riisnæs
