= Terje Gewelt =

Norwegian jazz musician

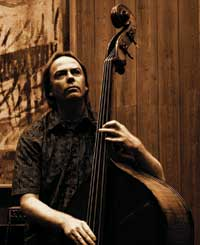
- Terje Gewelt

Background information
- Born: 8 June 1960 (age 66); Oslo
- Origin: Norway
- Genres: Jazz
- Occupations: Musician, composer
- Instruments: Upright bass, bass guitar, guitar
- Website: www.resonant-music.com

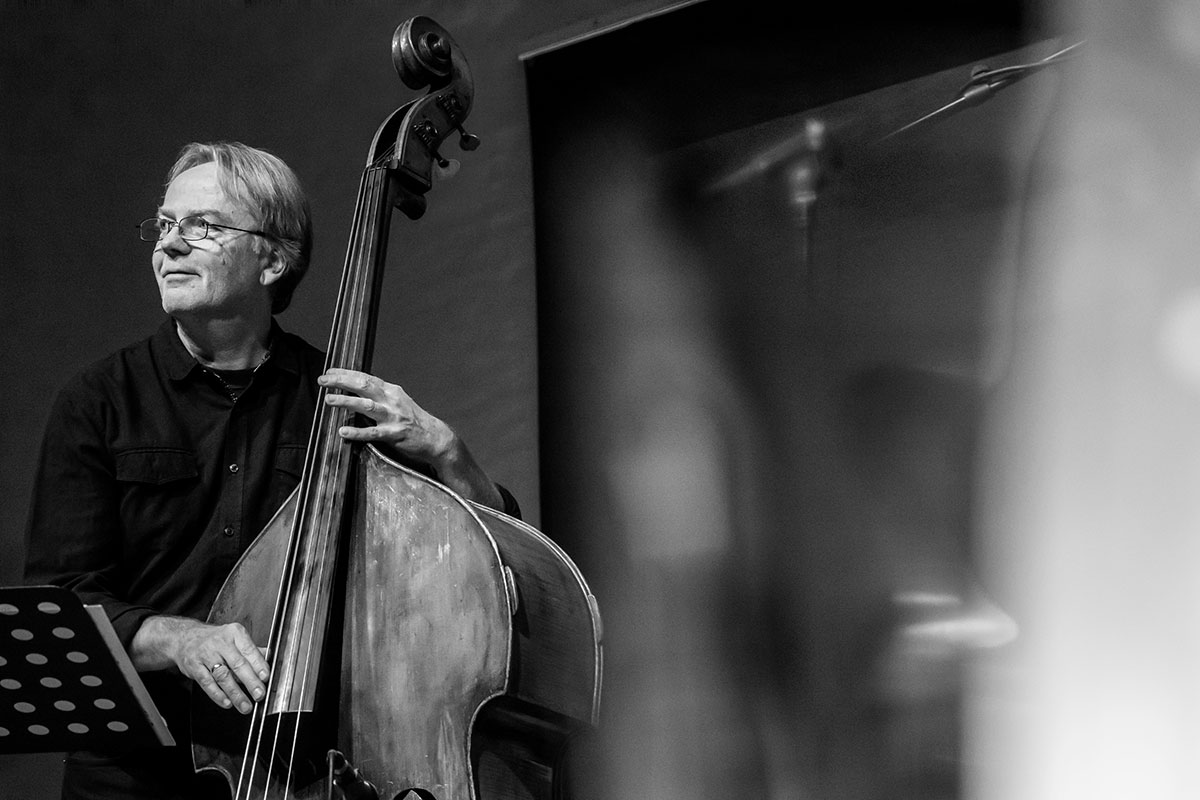
Denmark 2021 Photo Hreinn Gudlaugsson

Terje Gewelt (born 8 June 1960) is a Norwegian jazz musician (upright bass).

== Career ==
Gewelt was born in Oslo and raised in Larvik, a small town on the southeastern coast of Norway. He started playing guitar at the age of 10, switched to electric bass at 14 and added acoustic bass at 17.

From 1979 to 1981, he studied privately with the internationally recognized Norwegian bassist, Arild Andersen, and played in local jazz and fusion groups with, among others, the great Norwegian keyboardist Atle Bakken. In 1981, Terje went to the US to study bass at the Bass Institute of Technology in Los Angeles. He studied electric bass with Jeff Berlin and acoustic bass with Bob Magnuson and played in jazz clubs around LA with guitarist Les Wise.

In 1982, he moved back to Oslo and spent a year playing with many of the best Norwegian jazz musicians. In 1983 he returned to the States, enrolling at the Berklee College of Music in Boston, Massachusetts (1983–87). While at Berklee, he met and played with many young and talented musicians from around the world, including saxophonists Tommy Smith and Donny McCaslin and pianists Christian Jacob, Danilo Perez and Laszlo Gardony. He also took private lessons with the legendary bassist Jaco Pastorius in New York City and upright bass with Dave Holland, as well as playing with internationally composed groups like Forward Motion.

Terje co-founded the acoustic jazz quartet Forward Motion with saxophonist Tommy Smith and released the recording "Progressions". He was also a member of the American jazz / world music group Full Circle, playing on their first two recordings for CBS Sony.

In 1988, Terje was invited to California to work with Santana drummer Michael Shrieve, resulting in the recording Stiletto on RCA Novus which also featured Mark Isham on trumpet and Andy Summers and David Torn on guitars.

After 7 years in the United States, Terje moved back to Norway in 1989, soon becoming a first call bassist on the creative Norwegian jazz scene.

In 1995, he got a call to join Billy Cobham's group. Terje played acoustic bass on two Cobham CDs, Nordic (1998) and Off Color (1999) on Eagle Records.

In 1997, he started playing with Russian pianist Misha Alperin, recording two CDs, North Story and First Impression (featuring John Surman) on ECM.

In 1998, he started the record label Resonant Music. Terje has released eight CDs as a leader, all on Resonant Music. As a sideman, he has played bass on more than 100 jazz recordings, including recordings by Billy Cobham, Michael Shrieve, Misha Alperin, Dag Arnesen, Roy Powell, Staffan William-Olsson and Ahmad Mansour.

Terje is well known for over-dubbing multiple basses in some of his recordings.

== Selected discography ==
=== As leader ===
- 1999: Hide and Seek (Resonant Music), featuring Billy Cobham
- 2002: Duality (Resonant Music)
- 2003: Interplay (Resonant Music), duo with Christian Jacob
- 2004: Small World (Resonant Music)
- 2005: Hope (Resonant Music), duo with Christian Jacob
- 2007: If Time Stood Still (Resonant Music), trio with Kenneth Ekornes and Bjørn Klakegg
- 2009: Oslo (Resonant Music), trio with Enrico Pieranunzi and Anders Kjellberg
- 2010: Azure (Resonant Music)
- 2011: Selected Works (Resonant Music)
- 2012: Spindrift (Resonant Music)
- 2013: Steppingstone (Resonant Music)

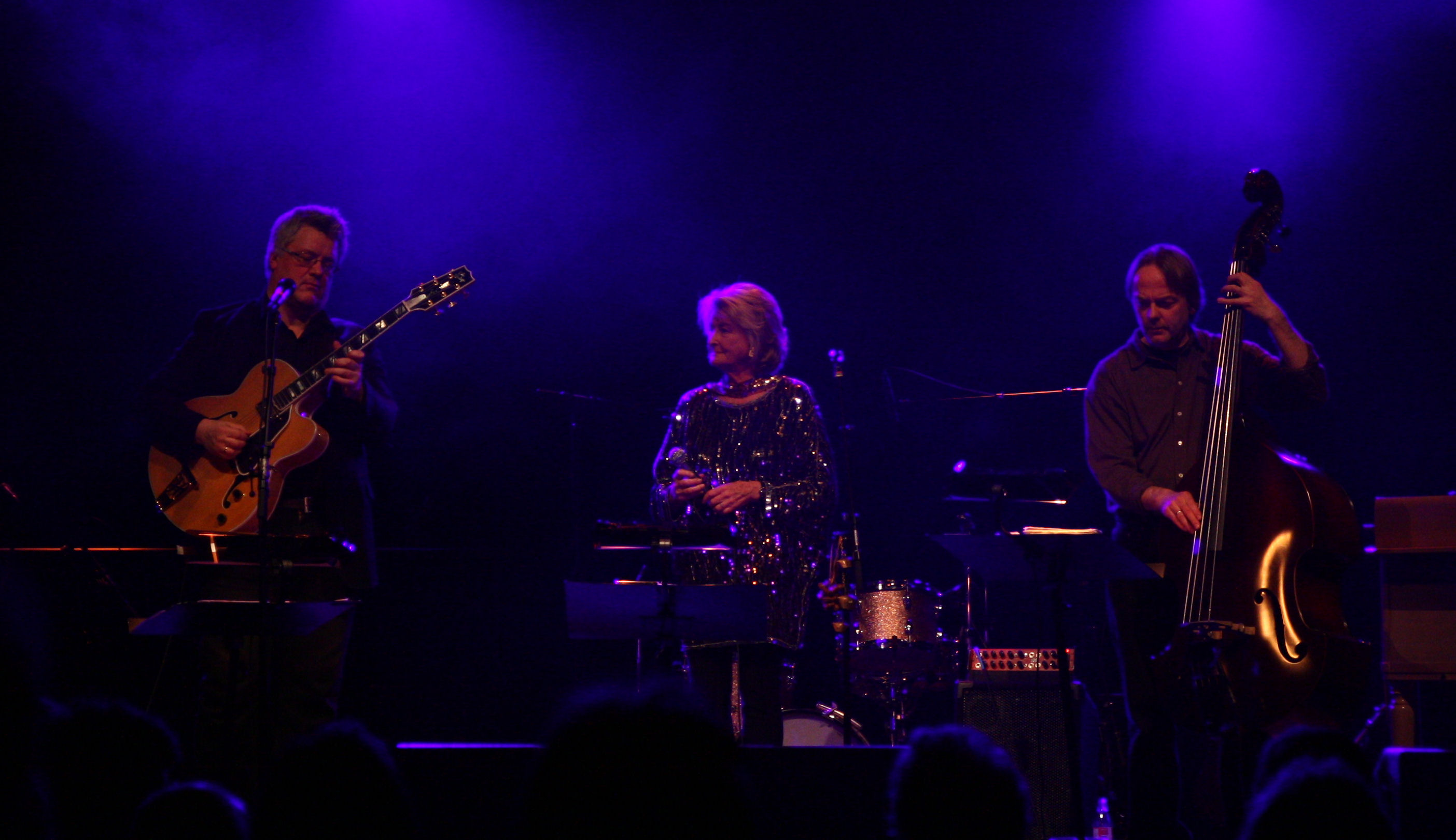
Staffan William-Olsson with Karin Krog and Terje Gewelt at the festival Ribbejazz December 29, 2009.

=== Collaborations ===
With Misha Alperin

- 1986: North Story (ECM Records), featuring Arkady Shilkloper
- 1986: First Impression (ECM Records), featuring John Surman

With Michael Shrieve

- 1989: Stiletto (RCA Novus)

With Tommy Smith

- 1990: Peeping Tom (EMI)

With Knut Værnes

- 1992: Admission For Guitars And Basses (Curling Legs), duo

With Dag Arnesen Trio

- 1994: Movin' (Taurus Records), including Svein Christiansen
- 2004: Time Enough (Taurus Records), including Pål Thowsen
- 2007: Norwegian Song (Resonant Music)
- 2008: Norwegian Song 2 (Resonant Music)

With Ahmad Mansour Trio

- 1995: Tumbleweed (Gorgone Productions)

With Petter Wettre Quartet

- 1996: Pig Virus (Curling Legs)

With Billy Cobham

- 1998: Nordic (Eagle Records)
- 1999: Off Color (Eagle Records)

With Roy Powell Trio

- 2003: Solace (Nagel Heyer Records), including Jarle Vespestad

With Karin Krog and John Surman

- 2013: Songs About This And That (Meantime Records), including with Ivar Kolve, Bjørn Klakegg and Tom Olstad
