= Tom Olstad =

Norwegian jazz drummer

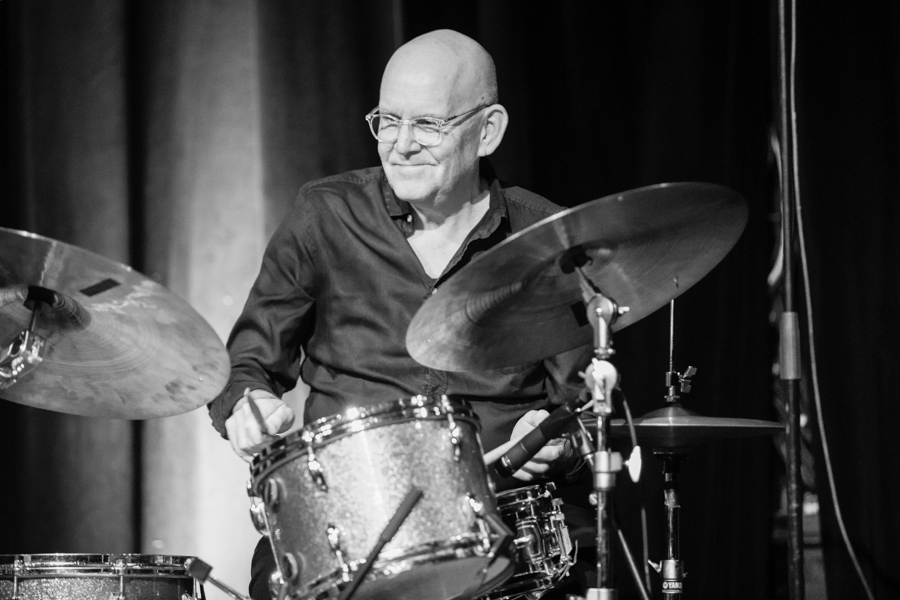
- Tom Olstad performing in 2020

Background information
- Born: 13 April 1953 (age 72); Gjøvik, Oppland
- Origin: Norway
- Genres: Jazz
- Occupations: Musician, composer
- Instrument: Drums
- Label: Ponca Jazz Records
- Website: www.poncajazzrec.no/olstad

Tom Olstad (born 13 April 1953 in Gjøvik, Norway) is a Norwegian jazz drummer who has performed on many recordings.

== Career ==
Olstad has lived in Oslo since 1973, when he started his musical studies at Østlandets Musikkonservatorium and University of Oslo, with a graduate thesis on the Jazz Life in Oslo at the 1980's (1992). In Oslo, he joined different jazz orchestras led by Harald Gundhus, Alf Kjellman/Ola Calmeyer, Guttorm Guttormsen, Vidar Johansen/Åsmund Snortheim, Erik Andresen, Atle Hammer, Carl Magnus Neumann, Odd Riisnæs, Christian Reim, Karin Krog, Vidar Johansen Trio including with Kåre Garnes, 1990–, Laila Dalseth/Totti Bergh Quartet, Brinck Johnsen, Merethe Mikkelsen, Sverre Kjelsberg, Magni Wentzel, Kjell Karlsen and Paul Weeden.

Olstad has collaborated in bands like Støff, Søyr, Python, Ab und Zu, Winds Hot & Cool and Radiostorbandet. He has also performed played with United States musicians such as Art van Damme, Art Farmer/Kenny Drew, Benny Bailey, James Moody, Eddie Harris. His first solo album was Changes for Mingus (2007) comprising original compositions inspired by the work of bassist Charles Mingus.

== Discography ==
=== Solo albums ===
- 2007: Changes For Mingus (Ponca Jazz)

=== Collaborations ===
Trio with Ivar Antonsen & Stig Hvalryg

- 2011: A Day at the Opera (Ponca Jazz)
