= Radka Toneff =

Norwegian singer (1952–1982)

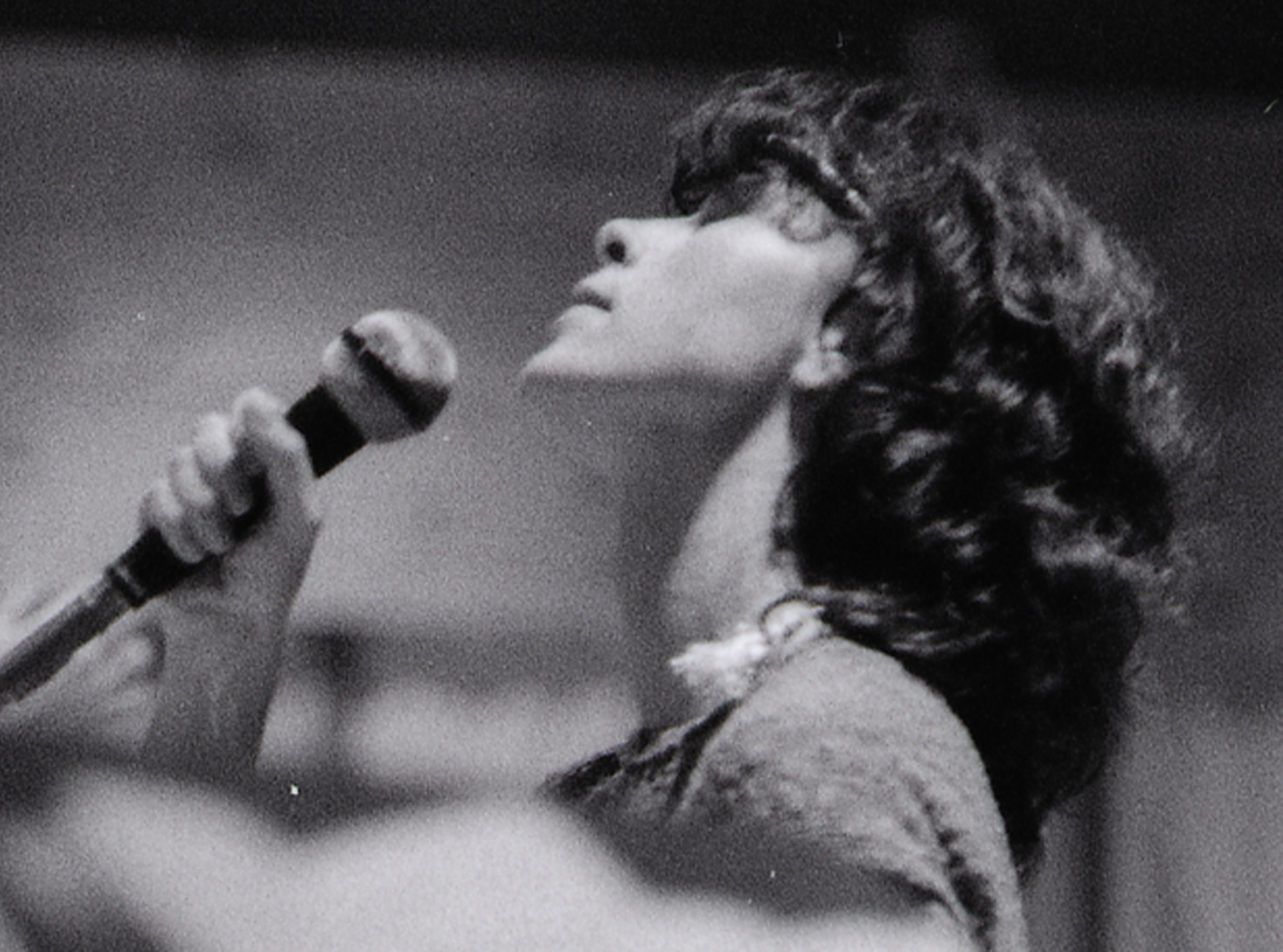
- Toneff live in Bergen, 1982

Background information
- Born: Ellen Radka Toneff; 25 June 1952; Oslo, Norway
- Origin: Norway
- Died: 21 October 1982 (aged 30) Oslo, Norway
- Genre: Jazz
- Occupations: Musician, composer
- Instrument: Vocals

Ellen Radka Toneff (25 June 1952 – 21 October 1982) was a Norwegian jazz singer, daughter of the Bulgarian folk singer, pilot and radio technician Toni Toneff, she was born in Oslo and grew up in Lambertseter and Kolbotn. She is still considered one of Norway's greatest jazz singers.

== Career ==
She studied music at Oslo Musikkonservatorium (1971–75), combined with playing in the jazz rock band "Unis". She also had her own Radka Toneff Quintet (1975–80), with a changing lineup. including musicians like Arild Andersen, Jon Balke, Jon Eberson and Jon Christensen, among others. Since 1979 she collaborated with Steve Dobrogosz. In 1980 she participated in the Norwegian national final of the Eurovision Song Contest with the song "Parken" by Ole Paus.

Toneff was awarded the Spellemannsprisen 1977 in the category best vocal for the album Winter Poem, and she posthumously received the Norwegian Jazz Association's Buddypris in 1982. The Radka Toneff Memorial Award is based on a fund created with royalties from the albums Fairytales and Live in Hamburg.

She lived with bassist Arild Andersen for some years, though she was involved with jazz drummer Audun Kleive at the time of her death. A biography of Toneff was published in 2008.

Toneff had roots in Bulgaria, and she grew up in Lambertseter (in Oslo) and Kolbotn (in a neighboring former municipality), and left deep traces in Norwegian jazz. In a poll of Norwegian musicians conducted by the newspaper Morgenbladet in November 2011, her 1982 album Fairytales was voted the best Norwegian album of all time. Toneff was found dead in the woods of Bygdøy outside Oslo on 21 October 1982. She had committed suicide with an overdose of sleeping pills.

== Honors ==
- Spellemannprisen 1977 in the class Best vocal for the album Winter Poem
- Buddyprisen 1982 posthumously

== Discography ==
=== Solo albums ===
- 1977: Winter Poem (Zarepta Records) – with the Radka Toneff Quintet
- 1979: It Don't Come Easy (Zarepta Records) – with the Radka Toneff Quintet
- 1982: Fairytales (Odin Records) – with Steve Dobrogosz
- 1993: Live in Hamburg (Odin Records) – with Steve Dobrogosz, Arild Andersen, and Alex Riel (recorded in 1981)

Compilations

- 2003: Some Time Ago – A Collection Of Her Finest Moments (EmArcy Records)
- 2008: Set It Free – Et Portrett Av Radka Toneff (KRF Records)
- 2008: Butterfly (Curling Legs)

=== Collaborative works ===
- 1971: Slutt Opp, Kamerat (Plateselskapet Oktober), "Fronteatret"/«Visegruppa PS»
- 1971: Svartkatten (Flora / Arne Bendiksen), Nationaltheatret
- 1975: Lise Madsen, Moses Og De Andre (Sonet Records), with Ole Paus
- 1978: Leve Patagonia (Philips Records), with Ketil Bjørnstad

Awards
Preceded by Knut Riisnæs	Recipient of the Buddyprisen; 1982	Succeeded by Terje Bjørklund, Knut Kristiansen & Espen Rud
Preceded by Knut Riisnæs & Jon Christensen	Recipient of the Jazz Spellemannprisen; 1993	Succeeded by Egil Kapstad Trio
