= Egil Kapstad =

Norwegian jazz pianist (1940–2017)

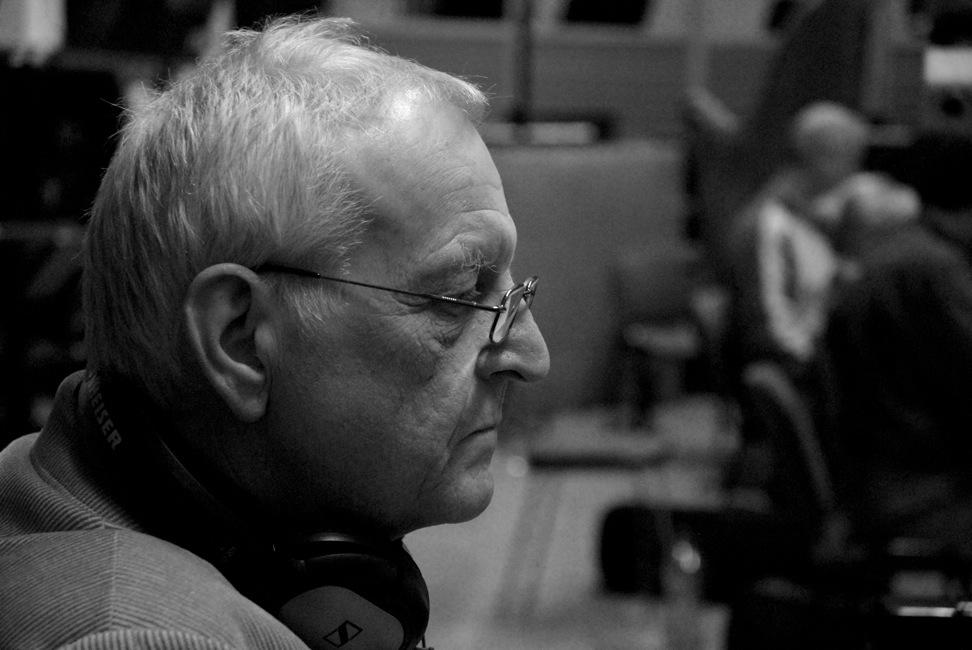

Background information
- Born: 6 August 1940; Oslo, Norway
- Died: 13 July 2017 (aged 76) Kristiansand, Norway
- Genres: Jazz
- Occupations: Musician, composer, arranger
- Instrument: Piano
- Website: www.egilkapstad.no

Egil Kapstad (6 August 1940 – 13 July 2017) was a Norwegian jazz pianist, composer and arranger. He wrote the music for more than 50 theatre productions, and composed for film and television drama. Kapstad composed classical works for orchestra, choir, string quartet, and smaller ensembles, and was a chief executive of the association Ny Musikk. He worked as a host in television for NRK. Egil Kapstad's Trio worked as a small orchestra in the Norwegian Melodi Grand Prix of 1965.

== Career ==
Kapstad was born in Oslo, Norway. He taught jazz history and improvisation at the Musikkonservatoriet i Kristiansand and performed as a pianist on more than 60 albums. Kapstad worked with jazz musician such as Karin Krog, Chet Baker, Red Mitchell, Bjørn Johansen, Bjarne Nerem, Jon Larsen and Magni Wentzel, being also known for his longstanding collaboration with poet Jan Erik Vold.

Kapstad received many awards and honors. He received Norsk jazzforbund's Buddyprisen in 1977, NOPA's award for the work of the year, (Epilog) in 1984, Gammleng-prisen in the class jazz in 1985 and was awarded Spellemannprisen in the class jazz twice, for the record Cherokee at the 1989 award of Spellemannprisen and Remembrance with the Egil Kapstad Trio at the 1994 award of Spellemannprisen.

Kapstad became a government scholar in 2003. He died in Kristiansand during July 2017.

== Compositions (selected) ==
- Syner (1967), performed in the new version 1990
- Epilog – Bill Evans in Memoriam (Vossajazz, 1983)
- Døgn for kammerorkester
- Theater music for Shakespeare's King Lear
- Theater music for Ibsen's Kongsemnerne
- Theater music for Helge Hagerup's Kuler i solnedgangen

== Discography ==
=== As leader or co-leader ===
Year recorded	Title	Label	Notes
1967?	Syner		
1979?	...spiller Einar Schanke		
1980?	Friends		
1984?	Epilog: Bill Evans in Memoriam	NOPA	
1988	Cherokee	Gemini	Trio, with Terje Venaas (bass), Egil Johansen (drums)
1993	Remembrance	Gemini	Trio, with Terje Venaas (bass), Egil Johansen (drums)
1998	Storytellers	Hot Club	With Jan Erik Vold (spoken word)
2003?	Friends		Kapstad/Johansen Quartet
2003?	Wolfvoices	Hot Club	

=== As sideman ===
- By Myself (1964), with Karin Krog
- Twostep og blå ballader (1974), with Lars Klevstrand
- I fløyterens hjerte (1990), with Lars Klevstrand
- I anstendighetens navn (1976), with Ole Paus
- Everything Happens to Me (1977), with Bjarne Nerem
- Til jorden (1978), with Rolf Jacobsen
- Live fra ABC-teatret (1979), with Odd Børretzen & Alf Cranner
- Live at Jazz Alive (1983), with Thorgeir Stubø
- Sofies plass (1983), with Magni Wentzel
- All or Nothing at All (1985), with Magni Wentzel
- My Wonderful One (1987/88)
- Dedications (1985), with Per Husby
- I Hear a Rhapsody (1985), with Totti Bergh
- Major Blues (1990), with Totti Bergh
- Time for Love (1986), with Laila Dalseth
- A Woman's Intuition (1995), with Laila Dalseth
- Den dagen Lady døde (1986), with Jan Erik Vold
- Blåmann! Blåmann! (1988), with Jan Erik Vold
- Sannheten om trikken er at den brenner (1990), with Jan Erik Vold
- Pytt pytt blues (1992), with Jan Erik Vold
- Obstfelder Live på Rebekka West (1993), with Jan Erik Vold
- Her er huset som Per bygde (1996), with Jan Erik Vold
- Storytellers (1998), with Jan Erik Vold
- Constellations (1990), with Bjørn Alterhaug
- Three Shades of Blue (1995), with Staffan William-Olsson
- Oslo Jazz Circle – Jubileumskonsert (1998), with various artists
- Round Chet's Midnight (1999), with Hilde Hefte
- Playsong (2001), with Hilde Hefte
- First Song (2000), with Bodil Niska
- Violin (2000), with Ola Kvernberg
- Playsong - the music of Bill Evans (2001), with Hilde Hefte
- Bjørn Johansen in Memoriam (2003)
- The Next Step with Jon Larsen (2003)
- Blue with Bodil Niska (2003)
- Hildes BossaHefte with Hilde Hefte (2003)
- Den dagen Lady døde with Jan Erik Vold (2003)
- Core Business with Louis Stewart (2004)
- Jargong Vålereng' with Rolf Søder (2004)
- On The Corner with Hilde Hefte (2006)
- AN EVENING IN PRAGUE with Hilde Hefte & The City of Prague Philharmonic Orchestra (2007)
- Drømmemakeren sa with Jan Erik Vold (2008)
- Short Stories with Hilde Hefte (2013)
- Quiet Dreams with Hilde Hefte (2017)

Awards
Preceded by Laila Dalseth	Recipient of the Buddyprisen; 1977	Succeeded by Kristian Bergheim
Preceded by Arild Andersen	Recipient of the Jazz Gammleng-prisen; 1985	Succeeded by Laila Dalseth
Preceded by Oslo 13	Recipient of the Jazz Spellemannprisen; 1989	Succeeded by Oslo Groove Company
Preceded by Radka Toneff & Jon Christensen	Recipient of the Jazz Spellemannprisen; 1993	Succeeded by Vigleik Storaas Trio
Preceded by The Brazz Brothers	Recipient of the Sildajazzprisen; 2001	Succeeded by Svein Olav Herstad
