= Gemini Records =

Norwegian jazz record label (founded 1984)

Gemini Records (initiated 1984 in Oslo, Norway) is a Norwegian record label founded and run by Bjørn Petersen (b. 1939).

== Background ==
The primary goal of Gemini Records was to release albums by saxophonist Bjarne Nerem. Gradually this aim broadened to release different standard jazz albums, while more experimental jazz was released on the label Taurus Records. The recordings normally took place at Rainbow Studios executed by Jan Erik Kongshaug. Record production was terminated in 2006, but the company continued producing some imports of jazz. In 2012 the compilation album Totti's Choice was released. Bjørn Petersen received the 2007 Ellaprisen at Oslo Jazzfestival for his work with the record label, as well as Kongens Fortjenstmedalje, the Norwegian King's Medal of Merit of gold in 2009. He lives in Asker, and was the recipient of the honorary award by Asker Jazzklubb in 2007.
