= Bjarne Nerem =

Norwegian jazz musician (1923–1991)

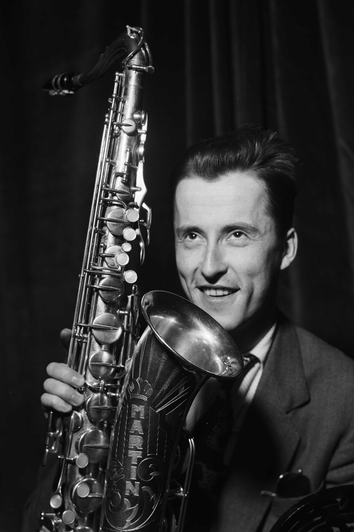

Background information
- Born: Bjarne Arnulf Nerem; 31 July 1923; Oslo, Norway
- Origin: Oslo, Norway
- Died: 1 April 1991 (aged 67) Oslo, Norway
- Occupations: Saxophonist, clarinetist & composer
- Instruments: Saxophone & clarinet
- Label: Gemini Records

Bjarne Arnulf Nerem (31 July 1923 – 1 April 1991) was a Norwegian jazz musician (tenor saxophone, alto saxophone and clarinet) among the foremost soloists in Norwegian jazz. He was in the tradition of Lester Young, Stan Getz. Nerem achieved international recognition for his performances.

== Career ==
Nerem was born in Oslo, and began his career playing clarinet during World War II, and recording with Syv Muntre (1943) and participated, among others within Rowland Greenberg's ensembles. The tenor and alto saxophone eventually became his main instruments, and started in 1947 a more than 20 years career in Stockholm, Sweden, where he became one of the first bebop performers and quickly became one of Sweden's most renowned, first in the orchestras of Thore Jederby and Santa Skoog (1947–49). After three years within Karl Westby's orchestra at Rainbow (Oslo), Nerem went into several Swedish bands including with Simon Brehm (1952 to 1954) and Harry Arnold's radio band (1956). He was a member of Carl-Henrik Norin's band (1968–71) and performed on recordings by Ove Lind, Siljabloo Nilsson, Lasse Sjösten, Arne Domnérus, Monica Zetterlund, Thore Ehrling and Nils Lindberg. The period culminated with the album How long has this been goin 'on (1971).

Nerem returned to Norway in 1973 and led his own Bjarne Nerem Kvartett releasing the album Everything happens to me (1976), awarded Spellemannprisen 1976. They also released This is always (1984), and contributed in Nerem solo album More than you know (1987). Furthermore, figured Nerem on releases with Karin Krog (1974), Sandvika Storband (1980) and Kristian Bergheim (The rainbow sessions, 1990). Internationally, he collaborated with Kenny Davern and Flip Phillips (1987), Al Grey (Al meets Bjarne, 1988). He died in Oslo.

== Honors ==
- «Gyllene skivan» (1971) for How long has this been going on
- Spellemannprisen 1976 in the class Jazz, for Everything happens to me
- Buddyprisen (1980)
- «Oslo bys kunstnerpris» (1983)
- Gammleng-prisen in the class jazz (1987)

== Discography (in selection) ==
=== Solo albums ===
- 1971: How long has this been going on (Odeon Records)
- 1987: More than you know (Gemini Records)

=== Within his own Quartet ===
- 1976: Everything Happens To Me (RCA Victor, reissued by Gemini Records)
- 1984: This Is Always (Gemini Records)

=== Portrait albums ===
- 2001: Portrait of a Norwegian Jazz Artist (Oslo Jazz Circles), recordings from 1962–80
- 2006: Embraceable you (Oslo Jazz Circles), recordings from 1984–88
- 2008: Bjarne Nerem – The big band sessions (1956-65) (Oslo Jazz Circles)
- 2008: Bjarne Nerem – The small band sessions (1955-76) (Oslo Jazz Circles)

=== Collaborative works ===
- 1971: Happy Jazz (Gazell), within Ove Lind Quintet, feat. Monica Zetterlund
- 1974: George Gershwin + Karin Krog (Polydor)
- 1988: Mood Indigo (Gemini Records), trio with Kenny Davern & Flip Phillips
- 1988: Al meets Bjarne (Gemini Records), with Al Grey

=== As sideman ===
With Benny Bailey and Åke Persson

- Quincy - Here We Come (Metronome, 1959) - also released as The Music of Quincy Jones (Argo)

With Stan Getz

- Imported from Europe (Verve, 1958)

With Roy Haynes

- Jazz Abroad (Emarcy, 1955)

With Quincy Jones

- Quincy's Home Again (Metronome, 1958) - also released as Harry Arnold + Big Band + Quincy Jones = Jazz! (EmArcy)

Awards
Preceded by Laila Dalseth	Recipient of the Jazz Spellemannprisen; 1976	Succeeded by Pål Thowsen & Jon Christensen
Preceded by Guttorm Guttormsen	Recipient of the Buddyprisen; 1980	Succeeded by Knut Riisnæs
Preceded by Laila Dalseth	Recipient of the Jazz Gammleng-prisen; 1987	Succeeded by Magni Wentzel
