= Laila Dalseth =

Norwegian jazz singer (born 1940)

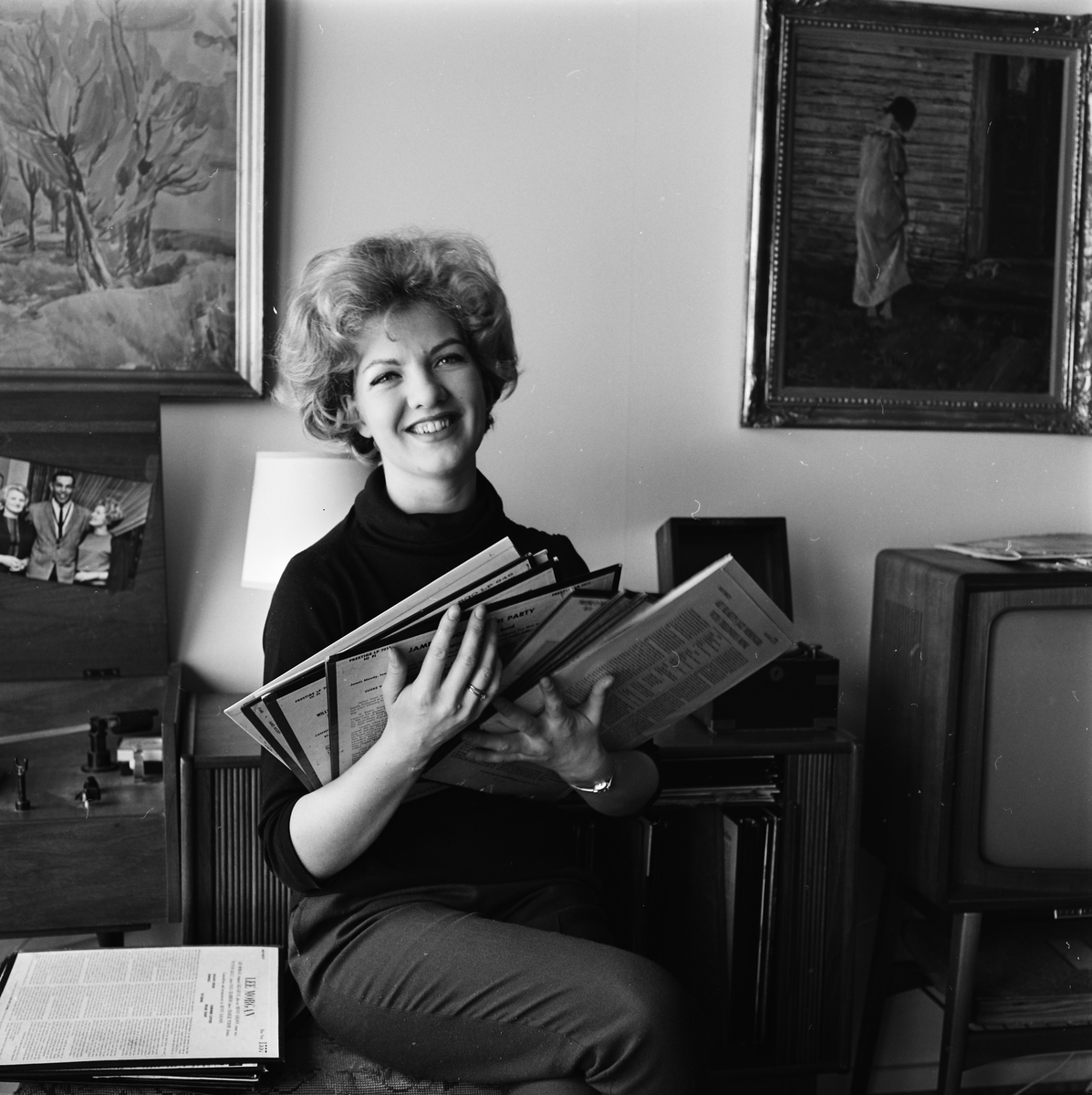
- Dalseth in 1966

Background information
- Born: 6 November 1940 (age 85); Bergen, Norway
- Genres: Vocal jazz
- Occupation: Singer
- Label: Gemini

Laila Dalseth (born 6 November 1940) is a Norwegian jazz singer. She was formerly married to the jazz saxophonist Theodor "Totti" Bergh (1935–2012).

== Career ==
After an early debut in her hometown of Bergen, Dalseth was active on the Oslo jazz scene, recording with among others, Kjell Karlsen (b. 1961), Egil Kapstad and Helge Hurum's big band. Dalseth first recording was Metropol Jazz (1963), participated in Stokstad/Jensen Trad.Band (1973−1975), in a band with Per Borthen, as well as at Teatret Vårt in the play Havhesten (1976). With her own band, she recorded Listen Here! (1999), 1960's album One of a Kind (2000) and then Everything I Love (2003), all on the Gemini label. L. D. Quintet consisting of husband Totti Bergh (saxophone), Per Husby (piano), Kåre Garnes (bass) and Tom Olstad (drums).

Dalseth was awarded Buddyprisen 1976, in addition to being awarded Spellemannprisen i klassen jazz on three occasions, for Just Friends 1975, Glad There is You 1978 and Daydreams 1984. She was internationally recognized for the record Time for Love (1986) with Red Mitchell, Travelling Light (1986) with Al Cohn, The Judge and I (1991) with Milt Hinton, A Woman's Intuition (1995), her own sextet featuring guitarist Philip Catherine, We remember You (1986/2003) with Al Cohn, and Everything I Love 2004. Five of these releases were critically ranked among the Ten best jazz albums of the year by the American jazz magazine Cadence.

== Honors ==
- 1975: Spellemannprisen, in the class Jazz, for the album Just Friends
- 1976: Buddyprisen
- 1978: Spellemannprisen in the class Jazz, for the album Glad There is You
- 1982: «Asker kommunes kulturpris»
- 1984: Spellemannprisen in the class Jazz, for the album Daydreams
- 1986: Gammleng-prisen
- 1994: «Oslo bys kulturstipend»
- 1999: «Oslo Jazzfestivals Ella pris»

== Laila Dalseth as Melodi Grand Prix contestant ==
Year	Title	Placing in the Norwegian final
1962	Mormors spilledåse	No. 5
1962	Kom sol, kom regn *	No. 1

- performed by Inger Jacobsen in the final, where it was no. 10

== Discography ==
- Swingin' Departure (1976), within Per Borthen Swing Department
- Glad There Is You (1978)
- Daydreams (1984)
- Time of Love (1986)
- Travelling Light (1987)
- The Judge and I (1992)
- A Woman's Intuition (1995)
- Listen Here (1999)
- Swingin' (1999), within Per Borthen Swing Department and Karin Krog
- One of a Kind (2001)
- We Remember You (2002)
- Everything I Love (2003)
- Takin' Off (2007), within Per Borthen Swing Department

Awards
Preceded by Stokstad/Jensen Trad.Band	Recipient of the Jazz Spellemannsprisen; 1975	Succeeded by Bjarne Nerem
Preceded by Bjørn Alterhaug	Recipient of the Buddyprisen; 1976	Succeeded by Egil Kapstad
Preceded by Pål Thowsen & Jon Christensen	Recipient of the Jazz Spellemannsprisen; 1978	Succeeded by Bjørn Alterhaug
Preceded by Masqualero	Recipient of the Jazz Spellemannsprisen; 1984	Succeeded by Per Husby
Preceded by Egil Kapstad	Recipient of the Jazz Gammleng-prisen; 1986	Succeeded by Bjarne Nerem
