= Jon Eberson =

Norwegian jazz guitarist and composer (born 1953)

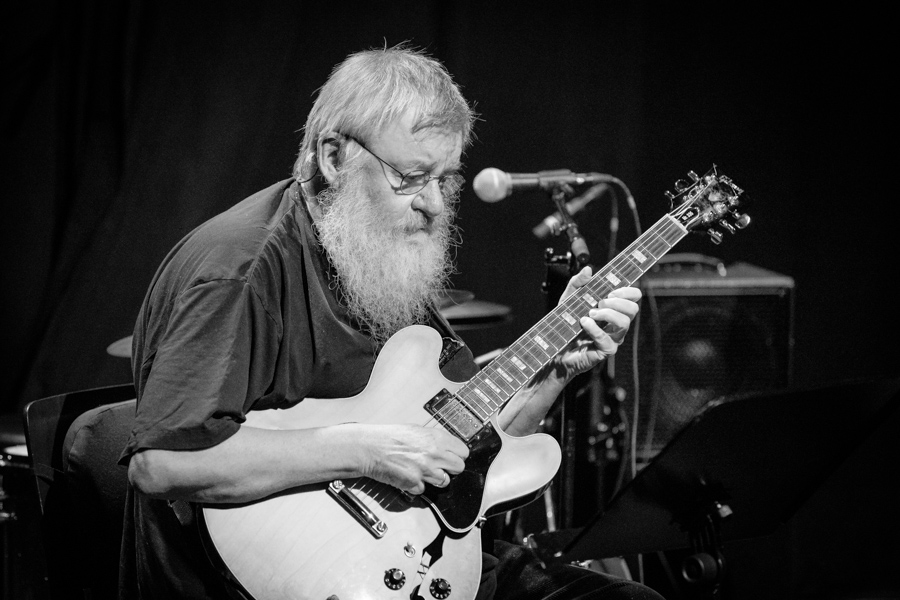
- Jon Eberson performing at Kongshaugfestivalen in 2019

Background information
- Born: Jon Arild Eberson; 6 January 1953 (age 73); Oslo, Norway
- Genres: Jazz
- Occupation: Musician
- Instrument: Guitar

Jon Arild Eberson (born 6 January 1953) is a Norwegian jazz guitarist and composer, the son of jazz guitarist Leif Eberson (1925–1970), and the father of keyboardist Marte Maaland Eberson. He was a member of the bands Moose Loose (1973–77), Radka Toneff Quintet (1975–80), and Blow Out (1977–78).

== Career ==
Eberson had his debut recording as a guitarist on Ketil Bjørnstad's debut album Åpning (1972). In 1980 he formed the Jon Eberson Group, supported by vocalist and lyricist Sidsel Endresen. The group attracted attention with Jive Talking (1981), which was awarded the Spellemannprisen, and City Visions (1984), but disbanded in 1986. The following year he released the Eberson Pigs and Poetry with Endresen, and he has continued to be noticed in a variety of contexts like the Jazzpunkensemblet.

He released the album Dreams That Went Astray (2001), closely followed by the album Jazz for Men, with bassist Carl Morten Iversen, and the album Mind the Gap, with bassist Bjørnar Andresen and drummer Paal Nilssen-Love. Eberson, who is associate professor of guitar at the Norwegian Academy of Music in Oslo, was awarded the Norwegian Buddy Prize for 2001.

In 2006 he collaborated with Per Zanussi and Torstein Lofthus on the album Bring It On.

In 2013 he celebrated his sixtieth anniversary with a performance at the Oslo Jazzfestival, presenting his band Eberson Funk Ensemble. The band consists of drummer Pål Thowsen, bassist Sigurd Hole, saxophonist Kim-Erik Pedersen, and his keyboardist daughter, Marte Maaland Eberson. both jazz graduates from the Norwegian Academy of Music. Eberson was a teacher at the Norwegian Academy of Music until 2019.

== Awards and honors ==
- Spellemannprisen for the album Jive Talking, with Sidsel Endresen, category jazz rock, 1981
- Buddyprisen, 2001

== Discography ==
- Thirteen Rounds (Curling Legs, 1997)
- Mind the Gap (Curling Legs, 2001)
- Jazz for Men (Curling Legs, 2001)
- Standards with Carl Morten Iversen (Curling Legs, 2003)
- Bring It On (Jazzaway, 2006)
- Empathy with Marte Maaland Eberson (Jazzland, 2018)

Awards
Preceded by Sidsel Endresen	Recipient of the Buddyprisen; 2001	Succeeded by Nils Petter Molvær
