= Totti Bergh =

Norwegian jazz saxophonist (1935–2012)

Theodor Bergh
- Also known as: Totti
- Born: Theodor Christian Frølich Bergh; 5 December 1935; Oslo
- Origin: Norway
- Died: 4 January 2012 (aged 76) Oslo
- Genres: Jazz
- Occupations: Musician, composer
- Instruments: Tenor saxophone, clarinet
- Formerly of: Kjell Karlsen's Orchestra; Christiania Jazzband

Theodor Christian Frølich Bergh known as Totti Bergh (5 December 1935 – 4 January 2012) was a Norwegian jazz musician (saxophone), the younger brother of the jazz journalist Johannes (Johs.) Bergh (1932–2001). He was married to jazz singer Laila Dalseth. He was born and died in Oslo.

== Career ==
Bergh began to play clarinet, and began learning the saxophone in 1952. In 1956, he became a professional musician. He was a regular member of Kjell Karlsen Sextet for three years, in addition to collaborating sporadically with Rowland Greenberg and other musicians on the Norwegian jazz scene as it once provisioned live dance music of good brand. He also made trips on the Norwegian America Ships with the ships' house orchestra on the voyage to New York. Bergh had mustered the America boat in 1960 and succeeded Harald Bergersen as tenor saxophonist in the Kjell Karlsen new big band. In the summer of 1961, the big band's new singer was Laila Dalseth, his wife to be. He also was in the lineup for the bands of Einar Schanke (1955–56), Rowland Greenberg (1960–64, 1974–81), and Per Borthen (1966–). In addition, he played in his wife Laila Dalseth's orchestra. Later, he played tenor saxophone and soprano saxophone with 'Christiania Jazzband' (from 1990) and with 'Christiania 12' (from 1992).

He released several albums, and his music is reminiscent of the world-renowned tenorists Lester Young and Dexter Gordon.

== Honors ==
- 1994: Gammleng-prisen
- 1995: The city of Oslo cultural scholarship
- 1997: The Ella-prisen at Kongsberg Jazzfestival
- 1999: Buddyprisen

== Discography ==
- 1986: Tenor madness (Gemini Records), with Al Cohn
- 1988: I hear a rhapsody, with Per Husby/Egil Kapstad (piano), Ole Jacob Hansen /Egil Johansen (musician) (1934–1998) (drums) & Terje Venaas (bass)
- 1991: Major blues, within his own quintet recorded at Oslo Jazzfestival, including George Masso (trombone), Major Holley (bass), Egil Kapstad (piano) & Pelle Hultén (drums)
- 1993: On the trail, with Plas Johnson
- 1995: Remember
- 1996: Warm Valley
- 1998: Night Bird, with Harry Allen & George Masso
- 2012: Totti's Choice (Gemini Records), Compilations released posthumously

Awards
Preceded by Einar Iversen	Recipient of the Buddyprisen; 1960	Succeeded by Erik Amundsen
