= Jens Wendelboe =

Norwegian trombonist, composer, and orchestra leader (born 1956)

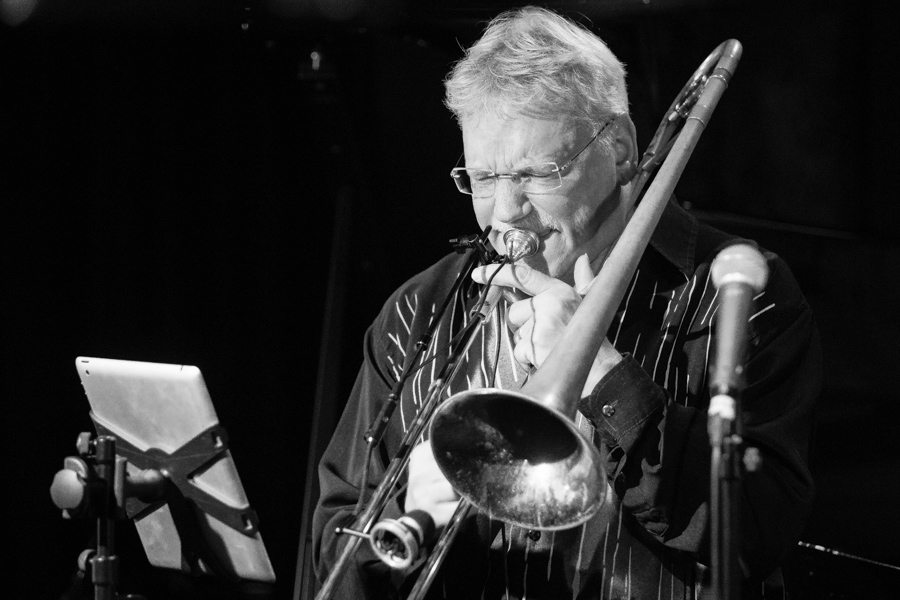
- Jens Wendelboe performing in 2019

Background information
- Born: 28 February 1956 (age 70); Copenhagen, Denmark
- Genres: Jazz
- Occupations: Musician, band leader, composer, trombonist
- Instrument: Trombone

Jens Wendelboe (born 28 February 1956 in Copenhagen, Denmark and raised in Oslo, Norway), is a Norwegian trombonist, composer, music arranger and orchestra leader, known from collaborations with artists like Slide Hampton, Phil Woods, Bill Watrous, Monty Alexander, Donna Summer and Blood, Sweat and Tears.

== Career ==
Wendelboe was educated at the "Østlandske Musikkonservatorium" (1975–79), joined the "Radiostorbandet" in 1980–84 and 1985–90, and was part of the Jazzpunkensemblet 1982–84, and led his first big band in 1983. He holds a master's degree at the Manhattan School of Music (1984–85), and released at the same time the big band album Letter from New York with American musicians. From 1985, he was in charge of the Big band Oslo Groove Company, and led his own big band "Big Crazy Energy Band and jazz Quartet". Otherwise, he was the conductor and arranger for singer Donna Summer and also for a series of stage productions and television shows and led the orchestra in the period 1985–1987. From 1991 he has been leading his own Big Crazy Energy Band, and the Crazy Energy Jazz Quartet. From 2006 to 2014 he was the regular trombonist with the legendary American jazz/rock-band Blood, Sweat & Tears.

He has received the NOPA award for Work of the year three times as a composer, for "Suite to Bjørn" (1982), "Animal-Suite for 5 tromboner" (1986) and "Winter Landscape" (1996).

== Honors ==
- AMC (American Mussic Center) 2009
- The "Lys Music Composition Contest" 2nd Prize for Jazz Orchestra Belgium 2003.
- 2000-2002. Scholarship to write a symphony.
- Norwegian Association for Popular Authors, stipend 1990, 1996, 1999, 2014
- Barga Jazz '92. 2nd Prize, International Arr. & Composition competition for Jazz Orchestra, Italy.
- Tono, stipend 1990, 1996, 2010
- Norwegian Association for Popular Authors' (NOPA) Prize of the Year for Best Composition, 1982 and 1986.
- Norwegian Composers Union, Anders Klæstads Scholarship.
- Composers Foundation, Scholarship, Oslo 1986.
- The City of Oslo, Cultural Stipend, 1986
- Study Scholarships by TONO (Ascap), (2) NOPA, Found. for Performing Artists Norwegian
- Government Establishing Scholarship & Travel and Cultural Stipend. 1980, 1986.
- Denmark Radio Cup, 1988 for originally composed orchestra piece.
- Grammy nominated with the BS&T horn section on two Jeff Lorber CDs: «He Had A Hat» 2009 and «Now Is The Time» 2010

== Discography ==
- 1983: 'lone attic – Jens Wendelboe Big Band (NOPA)
- 1985: Letter From New York – Jens Wendelboe New York Big Band (NOPA)
- 1991: Big Crazy Energy Band Vol. 1 – Jens Wendelboe (NOPA)
- 1992: Big Crazy Energy Band Vol. 2 – Jens Wendelboe (NOPA)
- 1996: Crazy Energy Jazz Quartet – Crazy Energy Jazz Quartet (Crazy Music)
- 1997: Strolling with the Groove – Jens Wendelboe (Rosa Records)
- 1999: Get Crazy – Crazy Energy Jazz Quartet (Crazy Music)
- 2000: LOGOS – Cantata for: Choir, Soloists, Symphony Orchestra, Rhythm and Horn section (LYNOR)
- 2001: A Look Inside – The Military Band, Western Region of the Norwegian Armed Forces (FMKV)
- 2010: Inspirations – Jens Wendelboe's Big Crazy Energy New York Band (Rosa CD)
- 2012: Fresh Heat – The Jens Wendelboe New York Band (Rosa CD)
- 2012: Erobreren (The Conqueror) Symphony Orchestra Film score for a mini, TV series
