= Pål Thowsen =

Norwegian jazz drummer (born 1955)

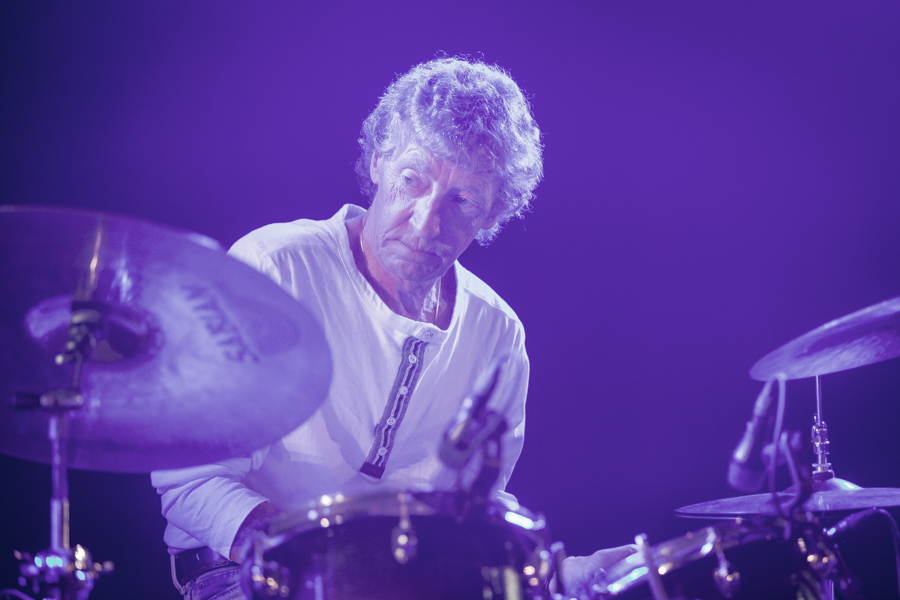
- Pål Thowsen performing in 2018

Background information
- Born: 15 July 1955 (age 71); Lillestrøm, Akershus, Norway
- Genre: Jazz
- Occupations: Musician, composer
- Instrument: Drums
- Website: thowsen.net

Pål Thowsen (born 15 July 1955) is a Norwegian jazz drummer. He has released several solo albums and received two Spellemannprisen awards.

== Career ==
Thowsen was born in Lillestrøm, and started his career in the early 1970s as a musician in Arild Andersen's quartet, finding international success throughout the decade. At the same time he was a member of the jazz rock band Moose Loose. In 1973 he collaborated for the first time with jazz guitarist Jon Eberson, a collaboration that has lasted throughout his career in various groups, and has recorded about ten albums with Ketil Bjørnstad. Other musicians he has worked with include Radka Toneff, Terje Rypdal, Palle Mikkelborg, Odd Riisnæs and Dag Arnesen and a member of the Jazzpunkensemblet, the Net, Halle / Eberson / Thowsen / Kjellemyr, Ole Paus and Finn Kalvik, Sinikka Langeland and Metropolitan.

Thowsen, along with Jon Christensen, won the 1977 Spellmanprisen for jazz album for the album No Time for Time, and the 1979 Spellmanprisen for jazz album for his album Surprise.

Since 2005 Thowsen has been Associate Professor at the Norwegian Academy of Music.

== Honors ==
- 1977: Spellemannprisen for No Time for Time (with Jon Christensen)
- 1979: Spellemannprisen for Surprise

== Discography ==
=== As Leader/Co-Leader ===
- No Time for Time (1976) (with Jon Christensen)
- Surprise (1979)
- Carnival (1981)
- Sympathy (1983)
- Call Me Stranger (1986) (with Tor Endresen)
- Life Goes On (1988) (with Tor Endresen)
- Collection (1992)
- The Eagle (1992) (with Morten Halle, Jon Eberson, Bjørn Kjellemyr)
- ...The Rest Is Rumors (2002)

=== As Sideman ===
With Moose Loose

- 1974: Elgen er løs

With Arild Andersen

- 1975: Clouds in My Head (ECM 1059)
- 1977: Shimri (ECM 1082)
- 2010: Green in Blue Early Quartets (ECM 2143-45)

With Arild Andersen Quartet

- 1974: Live in Warsaw, Jamboree Jazz 74 vol. 1 (Polskie Nagrania SXL 1180)
- 1978: Green Shading Into Blue (ECM 1127)

With Ketil Bjørnstad

- 1974: Berget det blå
- 1977: Selena
- 1978: Leve Patagonia!
- 1980: Tidevann
- 1981: Engler i sneen
- 1990: Odyssey
- 2000: Early Years (Universal Music Norway 013 271-2)
- 2022: The Seventies (C+C Records CCD076)

With Ketil Bjørnstad & Ole Paus

- 1975: Lise Madsen Moses og de andre
- 1982: Bjørnstad/Paus/Hamsun

With Radka Toneff

- 1979: It Don´t Come Easy
- 2003: Some Time Ago - A Collection of Her Finest Moments

With Jazzpunkensemblet

- 1991: Live at Rockefeller
- 1997: Thirteen rounds (Curling Legs)

With Dag Arnesen

- 2004: Time Enough (Gemini Records TRCD 845)
- 2008: Norwegian Song 2 (Resonant Music RM20-2)

With Dag Arnesen Trio

- 2007: Norwegian Song (Resonant Music RM17-2)
- 2010: Norwegian Song 3 (Losen LOS 101-2)

With Terje Rypdal

- 2020: Conspiracy (ECM 2658)

With Metropolitan

- 1998: Metropolitan
- 2004: Love is Blind (Curling Legs)

With The 00 Quartet

- 2001: The 00 Quartet

With Sinikka Langeland

- 2002: Runoja

With Jon Eberson Group

2000: Dreams That Went Astray (Jazzland 013 421-2)

With Elisabeth Karsten

- 1999: Flux

With Terje Gewelt

- 1999: Hide and Seek (Resonant Music RM2-2)

With Odd Riisnæs

- 1998: Your Ship

With The Net

- 1996: The Net

With Dennis Gonzales Band of Nordic Wizards

1994: Welcome to Us

With Sigmund Groven

- 1988: Aria
- 1991: Nattønsker
- 1993: Siesta
- 1996: I godt lag - Med venner

With Inger Lise Rypdal

- 1983: Just for You..

With Jimmy Webb

- 1982: Songwriters for the Stars

With Anne Karine Strøm

- 1982: Casablancas døtre

With Finn Kalvik

- 1974: Nøkkelen ligger under matta
- 1975: Ride ranke
- 1978: Fra A til Å

With Ole Paus

- 1979: Kjellersanger
- 1982: Noen der oppe

With Sigvart Dagsland

- 1985: Joker

With Arild Stav

- 2001: Dawn
