= Kjell Karlsen =

Norwegian band leader (1931–2020)

- Birth name: Kjell Oddvar Karlsen
- Born: 29 July 1931; Sarpsborg, Norway
- Died: 5 May 2020 (aged 88)
- Occupation(s): Band leader, arranger, composer, musician
- Instrument(s): Piano, organ

Kjell Oddvar Karlsen (29 July 1931 – 5 May 2020) was a Norwegian band leader, composer, arranger, jazz pianist and organist, and a Nestor of Norwegian music and show business, with a career spanning more than 60 years. He was the father of the singer Webe Karlsen.

== Career ==
Karlsen was born in Sarpsborg. Inspired by the Nat King Cole jazz ensembles from the time of World War II, he started his own orchestra at the age of 16 in 1947, The Syncopators Band, in Sarpsborg, and he soon became a central figure in the local jazz scene. In the period 1953–59, he had a series of bands with local musicians, many to be influential on the Norwegian and some on the World jazz scenes, like the jazz singer Karin Krog (1955–56), the saxophone players Totti Bergh (1955–59), Bjørn Johansen (1956–58) and Harald Bergersen (1959), and drummer Ole Jacob Hansen (1959), most of whom later would play central roles in the renowned Kjell Karlsens Big Band that he started together with saxophone player Mikkel Flagstad (1959–64). In addition to the ones listed above, K.K.B.B. featured musicians like trombonist Frode Thingnæs, bassist Erik Amundsen and the singers Grynet Molvig, Laila Dalseth, Odd Børre and Kirsti Sparboe among others. Karlsen also worked as a pianist and was an accompanist for a number of Norwegian and International Jazz soloists. He attended the first International Jazz Festival in Molde in 1961.

Karlsen founded the record label Viking Music in 1962, and among the signed bands and artists were The Beatniks, Rannie Rommen, Lorne Lesley and Jack Dailey. Kjell Karlsen's Big Band and Finn Eriksen also made recordings for the label. Karlsen was the initiator and opened the concert series Jazzakademiet in Oslo Konserthus (1997). Karlsen and a new generation of Norwegian musicians with Even Skatrud Andersen as one, gathered a new edition of the Kjell Karlsen Big Band and made the renowned arrangements to Edvard Grieg in jazz mood for the 10th anniversary of the Jazzakademiet in 2007, recorded in 2008.

In the summer of 2011, Karlsen was 80 years old and was celebrated with an anniversary gala at Oslo Konserthus where a large number of artist friends and partners lined up with a Big Band and choir for a musical event constituting a party out of the ordinary.

Karlsen died on May 5, 2020.

== Composer to the Melodi Grand Prix ==
Year	Title	Artist	Lyrics	Positioning in the Norwegian final	Positioning in the international final
1962	Kom sol, kom regn	Inger Jacobsen	Ivar Andersen	No. 1	No. 10
1969	Lena	Odd Børre	Kjell Karlsen	Nr. 2	

== Releases ==
- I selskap med K. K. Orkester vol 1, 3 and 3 (1968–71).
- K. K. Big Band Bonanza (Tylden, 2001)
- Edvard Grieg in jazz mood (Universal Music, 2009). Vokalbesetning: Pitsj, Heidi Ruud Ellingsen, Kåre Conradi, Torun Eriksen, Carsten Loly and Bjørn Johan Muri.

== Awards ==
- Gammleng-prisen 1995 in the class Veterans.

== Filmography (as composer) ==
- 1962: Sønner av Norge kjøper bil
- 1963: Freske fraspark
- 1964: Marenco
- 1974: Ante (TV series)
