= List of Norwegian jazz musicians =

This is a List of Norwegian jazz musicians, and a part of the List of jazz musicians and the List of Norwegian musicians notable enough for Wikipedia articles.

== A ==
- Steinar Aadnekvam
- Frøy Aagre
- Andreas Amundsen
- Arild Andersen
- Frida Ånnevik
- Tora Augestad

== B ==
- Jon Audun Baar
- Erik Balke
- Jon Balke
- Frode Barth
- Kjell Bartholdsen
- Espen Berg
- Frode Berg
- Andrea Rydin Berge
- Totti Bergh
- Kristian Bergheim
- Jarle Bernhoft
- Mads Berven
- Ove Alexander Billington
- Snorre Bjerck
- Christina Bjordal
- Asmund Bjørken
- Terje Bjørklund
- Ivar Loe Bjørnstad
- Ketil Bjørnstad
- Oddbjørn Blindheim
- Svein Olav Blindheim
- Brynjulf Blix
- Øystein B. Blix
- Stein Inge Brækhus
- Øyvind Brække
- Øyvind Brandtsegg
- Ellen Brekken
- Nora Brockstedt
- Rune Brøndbo
- Tore Brunborg
- Mari Kvien Brunvoll

== C ==
- Stian Carstensen
- Emilie Stoesen Christensen
- Jon Christensen
- Svein Christiansen

== D ==
- Thomas T. Dahl
- Erland Dahlen
- Harald Dahlstrøm
- Eyolf Dale
- Olav Dale
- Børre Dalhaug
- Laila Dalseth
- Daniel Heløy Davidsen
- Fredrik Luhr Dietrichson

== E ==
- Marte Eberson
- Jon Eberson
- Ditlef Eckhoff
- Johannes Eick
- Mathias Eick
- Trude Eick
- Mats Eilertsen
- Kenneth Ekornes
- Audun Ellingsen
- Torstein Ellingsen
- Odd André Elveland
- Sidsel Endresen
- Helén Eriksen
- Torun Eriksen
- Simone Eriksrud
- Audun Erlien

== F ==
- Per Arne Ferner
- Svein Finnerud
- Trygve Waldemar Fiske
- Frode Fjellheim
- Mikkel Flagstad
- Ingebrigt Håker Flaten
- Gabriel Fliflet
- Svein Folkvord
- Håvard Fossum
- Christer Fredriksen
- Arve Furset
- Svein Magnus Furu

== G ==
- David Gald
- Jan Garbarek
- Kåre Garnes
- Siri Gellein
- Terje Gewelt
- Anne-Marie Giørtz
- Ole Henrik Giørtz
- Jan Martin Gismervik
- Siri Gjære
- Frode Gjerstad
- Ole Amund Gjersvik
- Haakon Graf
- Rolf Graf
- Henning Gravrok
- Rowland Greenberg
- Ivar Grydeland
- Jostein Gulbrandsen
- Tord Gustavsen
- Finn Guttormsen
- Guttorm Guttormsen
- Ketil Gutvik

== H ==
- Morten Halle
- Tuva Halse
- Frode Haltli
- Børge-Are Halvorsen
- Harald Halvorsen
- Atle Hammer
- Ole Hamre
- Anders Hana
- Ole Jacob Hansen
- Trond Sverre Hansen
- Aslak Hartberg
- Jakop Janssønn Hauan
- Lars Andreas Haug
- Svein Dag Hauge
- Siril Malmedal Hauge
- Tor Haugerud
- Pål Hausken
- Hilde Hefte
- Eirik Hegdal
- Arve Henriksen
- Even Helte Hermansen
- Daniel Herskedal
- Svein Olav Herstad
- Per Hillestad
- Jan Gunnar Hoff
- Bendik Hofseth
- Sigurd Hole
- Geir Holmsen
- Wetle Holte
- Lars Horntveth
- Line Horntveth
- Martin Horntveth
- Sveinung Hovensjø
- Kirsti Huke
- Hans Hulbækmo
- Per Husby
- Stig Hvalryg
- Jan Kåre Hystad
- Ole Jacob Hystad

== I ==
- John Pål Inderberg
- Terje Isungset
- Carl Morten Iversen
- Einar Iversen

== J ==
- Torbjørn Sletta Jacobsen
- Frank Jakobsen
- Christian Jaksjø
- Nils Jansen
- Tore Jensen
- Bjørn Jenssen
- Kim Johannesen
- Erik Johannessen
- Bjørn Johansen
- Egil Johansen
- Håkon Mjåset Johansen
- Nils-Olav Johansen
- Per Oddvar Johansen
- Roger Johansen
- Tore Johansen
- Vidar Johansen
- Harald Johnsen
- Per Jørgensen

== K ==
- Hanne Kalleberg
- Olaf Kamfjord
- Maria Kannegaard
- Egil Kapstad
- Kenneth Kapstad
- Konrad Kaspersen
- Halvard Kausland
- Frode Kjekstad
- Bjørn Kjellemyr
- Hilde Marie Kjersem
- Bjørn Klakegg
- Rune Klakegg
- Audun Kleive
- Andreas Lønmo Knudsrød
- Sigurd Køhn
- Per Kolstad
- Ivar Kolve
- Kåre Kolve
- Kristoffer Kompen
- Jan Erik Kongshaug
- Olga Konkova
- Håkon Kornstad
- Tor Egil Kreken
- Knut Kristiansen
- Karin Krog
- Anine Kruse
- Benedikte Shetelig Kruse
- Bjørn Kruse
- Jannike Kruse
- Philip Kruse
- Ola Kvernberg
- Frank Kvinge

== L ==
- Geir Langslet
- Morten Gunnar Larsen
- Harald Lassen
- Anja Lauvdal
- Beate S. Lech
- Helge Lien
- Helge Lilletvedt
- Julius Lind
- Kristoffer Lo
- Torstein Lofthus
- Eivind Lønning
- Andreas Stensland Løwe
- Håvard Lund
- Lage Lund
- Alf Wilhelm Lundberg
- Geir Lysne
- Jo David Meyer Lysne

== M ==
- Lasse Marhaug
- Hans Mathisen
- Jørgen Mathisen
- Nils Mathisen
- Ole Mathisen
- Per Mathisen
- Sondre Meisfjord
- Fredrik Mikkelsen
- Sjur Miljeteig
- Andreas Mjøs
- Guro Skumsnes Moe
- Yngve Moe
- Bernt Moen
- Øystein Moen
- Nils Petter Molvær
- Kjetil Møster
- Kim Myhr
- Jo Berger Myhre
- Ole Jørn Myklebust

== N ==
- Magnus Skavhaug Nergaard
- Bjarne Nerem
- Rune Nergaard
- Silje Nergaard
- Marius Neset
- Gard Nilssen
- Paal Nilssen-Love
- Bodil Niska
- Helge Andreas Norbakken
- Robert Normann
- Øystein Norvoll
- Hermund Nygård
- Erik Nylander
- Kåre Nymark
- Lena Nymark
- Atle Nymo
- Frode Nymo

== O ==
- Kim Ofstad
- Jørn Øien
- Hildegunn Øiseth
- Njål Ølnes
- Tom Olstad
- Stian Omenås
- Kåre Opheim
- Carl Petter Opsahl
- Eivind Opsvik
- Even Ormestad
- Svein Øvergaard

== P ==
- Hanna Paulsberg
- Arvid Gram Paulsen
- Eivin One Pedersen
- Hallgeir Pedersen
- Kim-Erik Pedersen
- Hayden Powell

== Q ==
- Morten Qvenild

== R ==
- Eldbjørg Raknes
- Steinar Raknes
- Brynjar Rasmussen
- Knut Reiersrud
- Marius Reksjø
- Knut Riisnæs
- Odd Riisnæs
- Ane Carmen Roggen
- Ida Roggen
- Live Maria Roggen
- André Roligheten
- Elin Rosseland
- Marita Røstad
- Espen Rud
- Terje Rypdal

== S ==
- Ernst-Wiggo Sandbakk
- Tore Sandbakken
- Ole Marius Sandberg
- Natalie Sandtorv
- Marit Sandvik
- Philip Schjetlein
- Karl Seglem
- Gunhild Seim
- Trygve Seim
- Esben Selvig
- Kristin Sevaldsen
- Kenneth Sivertsen
- David Aleksander Sjølie
- Jonas Howden Sjøvaag
- Reidar Skår
- Even Kruse Skatrud
- Heidi Skjerve
- Erlend Skomsvoll
- Audun Skorgen
- Anja Eline Skybakmoen
- Baard Slagsvold
- Solveig Slettahjell
- Finn Sletten
- Erlend Slettevoll
- Eivind Solberg
- Torgrim Sollid
- Gaute Storaas
- Vigleik Storaas
- Øyvind Storesund
- Ståle Storløkken
- Håkon Storm-Mathisen
- Liv Stoveland
- Fredrik Carl Størmer
- Isak Strand
- Karl Strømme
- Thomas Strønen
- Håvard Stubø
- Kjersti Stubø
- Thorgeir Stubø
- Helge Sunde
- Torbjørn Sunde
- Christian Meaas Svendsen

== T ==
- Hild Sofie Tafjord
- Runar Tafjord
- Stein Erik Tafjord
- Martin Taxt
- Frode Thingnæs
- Hedvig Mollestad Thomassen
- Kåre Thomsen
- Ole Thomsen
- Magne Thormodsæter
- Pål Thowsen
- Radka Toneff
- Gisle Torvik
- Heine Totland

== U ==
- Sigurd Ulveseth
- Andreas Ulvo
- Stein Urheim

== V ==
- Ole Morten Vågan
- Knut Værnes
- Jonas Kilmork Vemøy
- Terje Venaas
- Jarle Vespestad
- Mathilde Grooss Viddal
- Nils Einar Vinjor

== W ==
- Carl Haakon Waadeland
- Christian Wallumrød
- David Wallumrød
- Fredrik Wallumrød
- Susanna Wallumrød
- Rob Waring
- Ellen Andrea Wang
- Gulleiv Wee
- Jens Wendelboe
- Magni Wentzel
- Bugge Wesseltoft
- Stian Westerhus
- Petter Wettre
- Erling Wicklund
- Håvard Wiik
- Freddy Wike
- Christian Skår Winther

== Y ==
- Jacob Young

== Z ==
- Ingar Zach
- Per Zanussi
