= Ove Alexander Billington =

Norwegian jazz pianist and composer

- Born: 10 August 1979 (age 47); Fredrikstad, Østfold, Norway
- Genres: Jazz
- Occupations: Musician, composer
- Instruments: Piano, keyboards
- Labels: Rune Grammofon; Bolage Records
- Website: Official website

Ove Alexander Billington (born 10 August 1979) is a Norwegian jazz pianist and composer, known as the band leader within his own Billington Trio and for his participation in bands such as Independent Jazz Orchestra, Speak Low, Mads Berven Quartet and Kjellerbandet.

== Early life ==
Billington was born in Fredrikstad, Norway. He studied music on the Jazz program at Trondheim Musikkonsevatorium (2002).

== Later life and career ==
While at university he started the Billington Trio including fellow students Andreas Amundsen (double bass) and Hermund Nygård (drums). He also collaborated with fellow students in the band Stjern including Stina Moltu (vocals), Andreas Amundsen and Hermund Nygård.

He joined the Inge Stangvik Quintet including Håvard Fossum (saxophone), Stig Hvalryg (bass) and Hermund Nygård (drums), and in the duo Yours Truly with Gine Gaustad Anderssen.

Billington collaborates within the quintet of Danish singer Majken Christiansen. He worked sporadically with musicians including Ole Jørn Myklebust, Yasuhito Mori, Tore Johansen, Petter Wettre, Bjørn Johan Muri, Staffan William-Olsson, Bodil Niska and Nora Brockstedt, and in the bands Funky Butt and The Sinatra Songbook. In 2013 he performed with vocalist Dina Nordsjø and his band, including Lars Martin Skjørshammer (bass) and Jakop Jansønn (drums), at Oslo Konserthus.

== Discography ==
- 1997: Det er makt i de foldede hender (1997), album med Svenn-Erik Fjeldheim
- 2001: Synergy (2001), within "Fredrikstad Storband"
- 2004: I Fall in Love To Easily (Liphone), with Grethe Kruse
- 2008: Jul i Halden (2008), with various artists
- 2009: Yours Truly (Jazzaway), with "Yours Truly"
- 2009: Walk With Me (2009), with Ina Grefslie
- 2009: Jul i Halden (2009), with various artists
- 2011: Speak Love (2011), with Majken Christiansen
