= Paul Wagnberg =

Swedish–Norwegian jazz musician (born 1961)

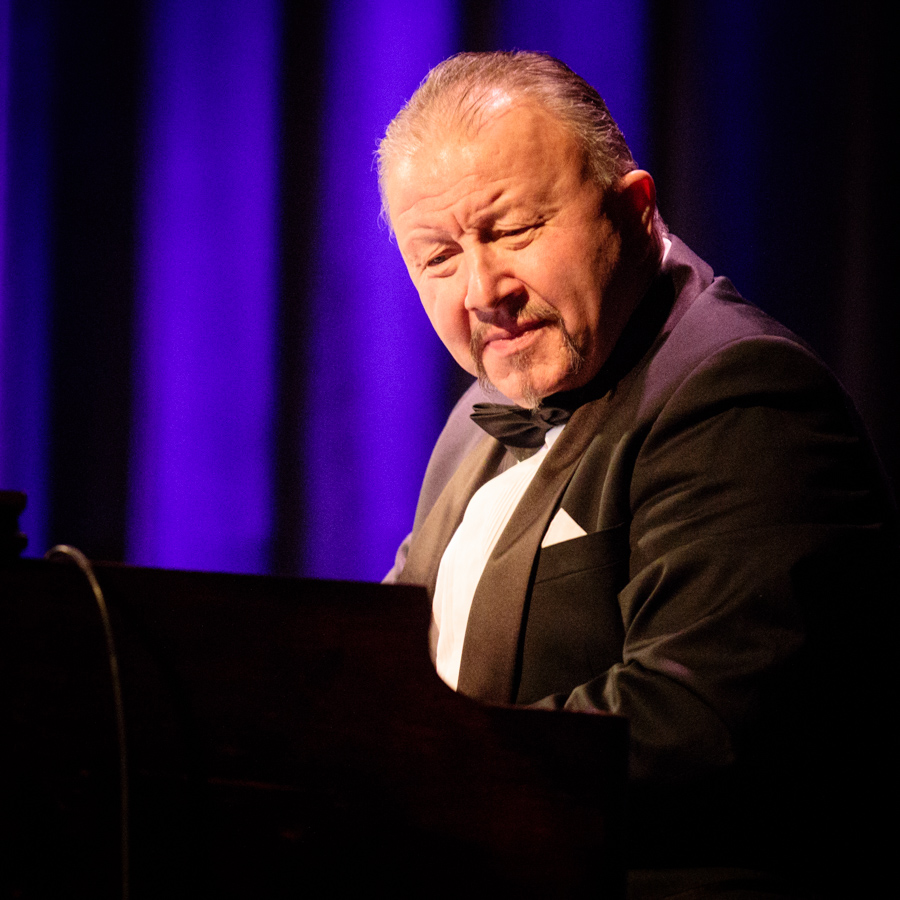
- Paul Wagnberg performing in 2017

Background information
- Also known as: Paul 'Groove' Wagnberg
- Born: Palle Wagnberg; 25 April 1961 (age 64); Norrköping, Sweden
- Origin: Sweden
- Genres: Jazz, rock
- Occupations: Musician, composer
- Instruments: Keyboards, piano, organ, Hammond B3 organ
- Years active: 1985–present
- Member of: The Real Thing
- Website: www.paulwagnberg.com

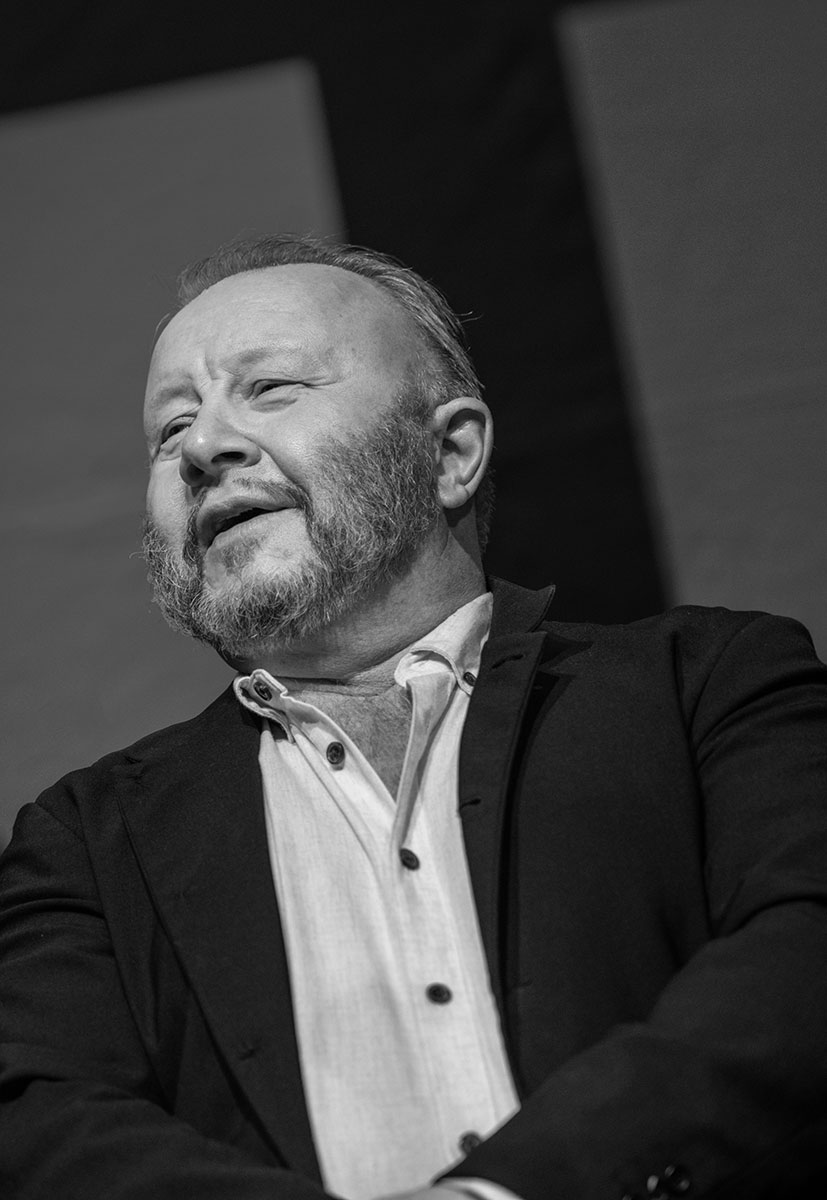
Jazzy Days Festival, Denmark 2023

Paul (Palle) Wagnberg (born 25 April 1961 in Norrköping, Sweden) is a Swedish–Norwegian jazz musician, mostly known for his jazz-organ playing. He also sings and plays the piano in addition to composing.

== Career ==
Wagnberg was born in Norrköping, Sweden. Since 1985 he has been playing professionally with his Hammond B3 organ. He is in particular known for his footwork on the bass pedals.

He is known for his collaborations within the Swedish-Norwegian jazz quartet The Real Thing, comprising Wagnberg (Hammond B3 organ), Staffan William-Olsson (guitar), Børre Dalhaug (drums) and the late Sigurd Køhn (saxophone). The Real Thing is currently put on hold after Køhn died in 2004 in Thailand by the tsunami catastrophe.

With his own trio Wagnberg has released three albums, Eat Meat (1999) with Torstein Ellingsen (drums) and Randy Johnston (guitar), Gone Fishing (2001) with Torstein Ellingsen (drums) and Frode Kjekstad (guitar) and Catch 22 (2007) with Erik In 2009 he contributed organ on Stina Stenerud's album Kissing Fools with Hildegunn Øiseth on trumpet. Apart from his own "Organ Unit", Wagnberg is organist in the tribute band "Santana The Experience" from Stockholm.

== Discography ==
=== Solo albums ===
Paul Wagnberg Trio

- 1999: Eat Meat (Real Music Records)
- 2001: Gone Fishing (Real Music Records)

Paul Wagnberg Organ Unit

- 2007: Catch 22 (Real Music Records)

=== Collaborative works ===
Within The Real Thing

- 1992: The Real Thing (Real Music Records)
- 1993: ...in New York (Real Music Records), feat. Lew Soloff produced by Georg "Jojje" Wadenius, and nominated for the Spellemannprisen 1994
- 1994: A Perfect Match (Real Music Records), with Bohuslän Big Band, arranged and produced by the Los Angeles-based arranger Tom Kubis
- 1995: Live (Real Music Records)
- 1997: Pleasure is an Attitude (Real Music Records)
- 2000: Deluxe (Real Music Records), with Even Kruse Skatrud and the Norwegian Radio Orchestra
- 2003: New Wrapping (Real Music Records)
- 2006: A Real Christmas (Real Music Records), feat. Sigrid Brennhaug on vocal

With J.T. Lauritsen & The Buckshot Hunters

- 1995: Buckshot Hunters (Hunters Records)
- 1999: My Kind of Blues (Hunters Records)
- 2001: Make A Better World(Hunters Records)
- 2004: Perfect Moves (Hunters Records)

Within Børre Dalhaug's "Bigbandblast»

- 2004: Bigbandblast! (Real Records)

With Stina Stenerud

- 2009: Kissing Fools (Hunter Records)
