= Fredrik Carl Størmer =

Fredrik Carl Størmer (born 12 July 1957) is a jazz drummer and entrepreneur based in Oslo, Norway and is named after his great grandfather the Norwegian mathematician. Based on his music and business experience, he has developed the JazzCode – a term describing the guiding principles used by jazz musicians in particular and professional teams in general to create a successful performance. The JazzCode applies to small teams having to manage complexity and rapid change. It is also relevant to organizations change cultures in order to adapt to rapidly changing contexts. Størmer has also developed a method to improve how small teams manage complex problems in thinking, reading and writing and his class is used by consultants, analysts, project managers and top teams in several Norwegian companies.

== Background ==
After 11 years in the United States, where he obtained a Bachelor of Music in jazz performance from New England Conservatory (1983), a Master of Music in jazz from Manhattan School of Music (1985), a Master of Fine Arts in arts management from Columbia University (1987) and worked as a professional musician, Størmer returned to Norway in 1991. Back in Oslo, he founded the jazz band The Real Thing in collaboration with guitarist Staffan William-Olsson (b. 1959). They were later joined by Sigurd Køhn (1959–2004) and Paul “Palle” Wagnberg (born 1961). The band soon became one of Norway's most popular and bestselling jazz bands, releasing three albums – The Real Thing (1991), The Real Thing in New York (1992 feat. Lew Soloff), and A Perfect Match (1994).

== Musical training ==
Størmer's first drum teacher was the Norwegian drummer Jon Christensen with whom he studied from 1971 to 1976. While at New England Conservatory he studied with Alan Dawson, Gary Chaffee, Miroslav Vitouš, and George Russell. While at Manhattan School of Music he studied with Justin DiCioccio and Gary Chester.

== Music and business ==
In 1992 the city of Oslo wanted to adopt the French music festival “Fête de la Musique”. Carl Størmer established the festival and was managing director for the first two years. Even in its first year, “Musikkens Dag” gathered thousands of people and artists in the streets of Oslo.

In 1995 Størmer left music to pursue a business career with IBM. His fascination for technology (he had previously worked both with programming drums and databases in the United States) soon took him to the Internet, e-business and management consulting. In 1999 he moved back to the US and together with Espen Odegard he co-founded StudentUniverse, an online travel business which in 2008 became a global company.

In 2003 Størmer was recruited to become the head of marketing (CMO) at Norwegian Air Shuttle, Scandinavia's largest low-cost carrier. During his tenure he was a core member of the team that took the company [public]in 2004. He left the company in 2004 to start his own business, JazzCode AS is incorporated in Norway (Tax ID # 991-411-917). The JazzCode is being presented to business, academic and jazz audiences in Europe, Australia and the United States. In 2008 Størmer gave several lectures about the JazzCode at Insead (France) and London Business School (UK) and published a case at Harvard Business School (US) with professor Robert D. Austin about the groundbreaking 1959 recording of Miles Davis' Kind of Blue. JazzCode has released several recordings on which Størmer plays the drums, including In the Moment (2007) featuring Rob Scheps, Georg "Jojje" Wadenius, Cameron Brown and Jamie Reynolds, Codes for Christmas (2008) featuring Rob Scheps, Scott Wendholt, Bruce Barth, and Doug Weiss, Being Here (2011) and Entering the Human Age (2011) featuring Knut Riisnæs, Lars Jansson and Mats Eilertsen, Control is for Beginners (2014) featuring Bendik Hofseth, Lars Jansson, and Mats Eilertsen, and Always Different (2016) featuring Bendik Hofseth, Mike Mainieri, Bruno Raberg, Jørn Øien, and Sidiki Camara

== Discography ==
In his own name:

- 2007: In the Moment (2007) feat. Rob Scheps, Georg "Jojje" Wadenius, Cameron Brown and Jamie Reynolds
- 2008: Codes for Christmas (2008) feat. Rob Scheps, Scott Wendholt, Bruce Barth & Doug Weiss
- 2011: Being Here (2011), feat. Knut Riisnæs, Lars Jansson & Mats Eilertsen
- 2011: Entering the Human Age (2011), feat. Knut Riisnæs, Lars Jansson, Mats Eilertsen and Carl Størmer
- 2014: "Control is for Beginners" (2014), feat. Bendik Hofseth, Lars Jansson, Mats Eilertsen and Carl Størmer
- 2016: "Always Different" (2016), feat. Mike Mainieri, Bendik Hofseth, Bruno Raberg, Jørn Øien, Sidiki Camara and Carl Størmer

With The Real Thing:

- 1992: The Real Thing (Real Music Records) featuring Køhn, Wagnberg, William-Olsson and Størmer.
- 1993: ...in New York (Real Music Records), feat. Lew Soloff produced by Georg «Jojje» Wadenius, and nominated for the Spellemannprisen 1994 with Køhn, Wagnberg, William-Olsson and Størmer.
- 1994: A Perfect Match (Real Music Records), with Bohuslän Big Band, arranged and produced by the Los Angeles-based arranger Tom Kubis with Køhn, Wagnberg, William-Olsson and Størmer.
