= Anders Aarum =

Norwegian jazz pianist

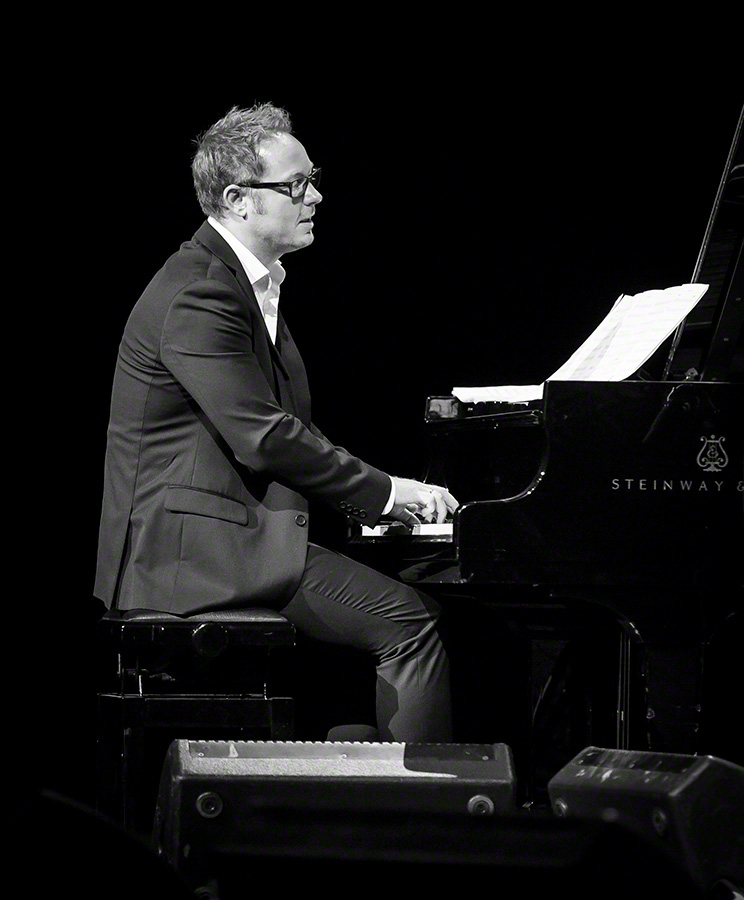
- Anders Aarum at Oslo Jazzfestival 2016

Background information
- Born: 17 December 1974 (age 51); Moss, Østfold, Norway
- Genres: Jazz
- Occupations: Musician, composer
- Instruments: Piano, keyboards
- Labels: Ponca Jazz; Jazzaway; Schmell
- Member of: Funky Butt
- Website: www.poncajazzrec.no/aarum

Anders Aarum (born 17 December 1974) is a Norwegian jazz pianist, known from numerous albums and international collaborations like Sonny Simmons, Ola Kvernberg, Tine Asmundsen, Sigurd Køhn, Børre Dalhaug, Nora Brockstedt and Even Kruse Skatrud.

== Biography ==
Aarum was educated at Agder Musikkonservatorium, Sibelius Academy in Helsinki, before he headed for Oslo in 1998. His jazz talent impressed the Oslo jazz community, and he was a popular collaborator within several bands, while he continued studying at Norges Musikkhøgskole and graduated with the thesis Stiltrekk som skiller den nordiske jazzen fra den afro-amerikanske. He led his own Anders Aarum Trio to the debut album Lucky strike (2000) accompanied by Mats Eilertsen (bass) and Torstein Ellingsen (drums). It was followed up with Absence in mind (2004), where Ellingsen was replaced by Thomas Strønen. The third album of the Trio, First communion (2006), included Ole Morten Vågan (bass) and Andreas Bye (drums).

Aarum is also involved in FAQ (Fossum-Aarum Quartet) together with the brothers Håvard (saxophone and flute) and Jens Fossum (bass). The drummer Jarle Vespestad is the last but not least member of the crew. F.A.Q. was nominated for the 2007 Spellemannprisen in the class Jazz, for their debut album Frequently Asked Questions (2007). He is also regular pianist in the band Funky Butt. Otherwise, he has collaborated on releases with Per Høglend, Randi Tytingvåg, Sølvi Hansen, Ola Kvernberg, Majken Christiansen, Tine Asmundsen, Sigurd Køhn, Sonny Simmons, Børre Dalhaug, Hilde Louise Asbjørnsen, Jazzmob, Nora Brockstedt and Even Kruse Skatrud. Aarum was awarded the "No-fear Prize" by "Oslo Jazzradio", and is associated with Norges Musikkhøgskole as lecturer in accompaniment.

== Honors ==
- "No-fear" Award 2002 by "Oslo Jazzradio"

== Discography ==
=== As band leader ===
Within Anders Aarum Trio

- 2000: Lucky strike (Hot Club)
- 2004: Absence in Mind (Jazzaway)
- 2006: First Communion (Jazzaway)
- 2018 Shakin' Our Souls (Ozella) http://www.ozellamusic.com/en/release/shakin-our-souls-4/

Within FAQ (Fossum-Aarum Quartet)

- 2007: Frequently Asked Questions (Schmell), recorded in 2004

=== Collaborations ===
Within Funky Butt

- 2001: Whoopin' (Sonor)
- 2002: The Glove (Sonor)
- 2005: Big Mama (Schmell)
- 2007: Shakin' da butt (Schmell)

Within Jazzmob

- 2001: Pathfinder
- 2006: Flashbackrecorded live at Moldejazz 2006

Within The Swing Pack

- 2001: The Sinatra Songbook (Island)
- 2003: Urban Breeze (Tylden & Co)

With Sonny Simmons

- 2005: The Traveller (Jazzaway)
- 2006: I'll See You When I Get There (Jazzaway)
- 2007: Last Man Standing (Jazzaway)

With Hilde Louise Asbjørnsen

- 2005: Birdie Blues (Upnorth Discs)
- 2008: Sound Your Horn (Sweet Morning)
- 2010: Never Ever Going Back (Sweet Morning)
- 2011: Divin' at the Oceansound (Sweet Morning)

With other projects

- 2001: Violin (Hot Club), with Ola Kvernberg
- 2001: Song for My Father (Hot Club), with Majken Christiansen
- 2003: aLive (Hazel Jazz), with Tine Asmundsen – recorded in 2002
- 2003: Reporter (Hot Club), with Majken Christiansen live at Herr Nilsen Jazzclub
- 2004: Bigbandblast! (Real), within Børre Dalhaug's "Bigbandblast"
- 2005: This Place (Køhn), within Sigurd Køhn Quartet
- 2005: Eveneven (Eveneven), within Even Kruse Skatrud's Eveneven Big Band
- 2005: Christmas Songs (Køhn), with Nora Brockstedt
- 2006: Midnight (EMI), with Bertine Zetlitz
- 2006: Let Go (Mudi), with Randi Tytingsvåg
- 2006: Edvard Grieg in Jazz mood (Universal), within Kjell Karlsen Big Band
- 2008: My Letter to the World (Nordic), with Hanne Tveter – words by Emily Dickinson
- 2009: Transformation to Paradise (Jazzaway), within Element – recorded in 2002
- 2009: Stompin' Feet (Sweet Morning), with Julie Dahle Aagård
- 2009: Warrior of Light (EmArcy), with Christina Bjordal
- 2010: Bad Dreams And Good Nightmares (Sweet Morning), with Guro von Germeten

== See also ==
- List of jazz pianists
