= Hilde Louise Asbjørnsen =

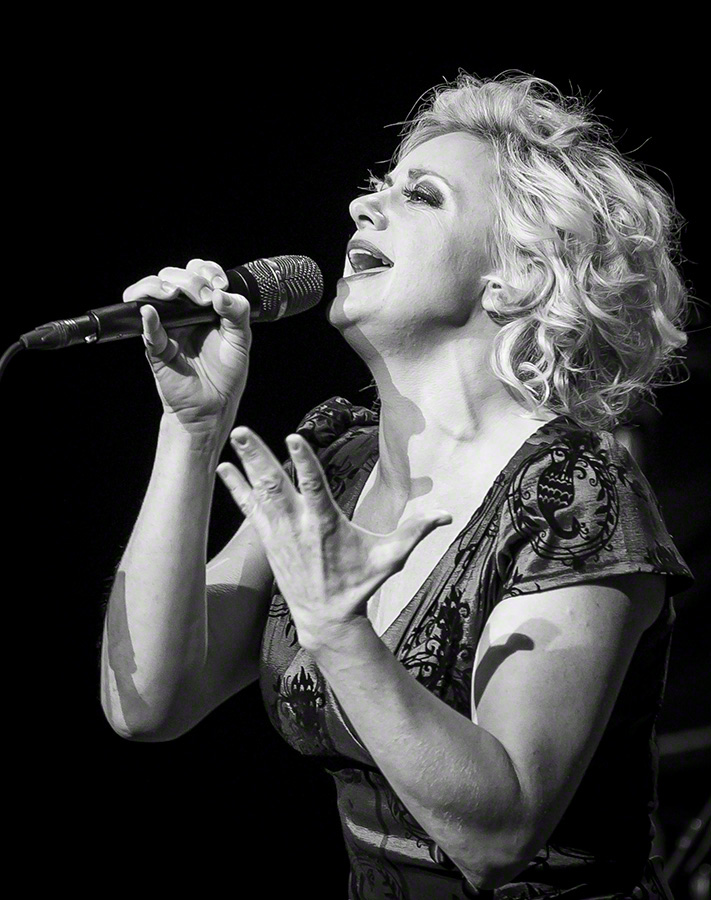
- Hilde Louise Asbjørnsen at Oslo Jazzfestival 2016

Background information
- Born: 3 June 1976 (age 50); Sykkylven Municipality, Møre og Romsdal
- Origin: Norway
- Genres: Jazz
- Occupations: Musician, comedian
- Instrument: Vocals
- Website: www.hildelouise.com

Hilde Louise Asbjørnsen (born 3 June 1976 in Sykkylven Municipality, Norway) is a Norwegian jazz singer, cabaret artist and songwriter, known from her own releases and appearances.

== Career ==
After moving to Oslo in 1996 she studied Science Theatre at Theatre science department, University of Oslo (1996–2001), and initiated the duo «Asbjørnsen & Joh.» together with Lene Kongsvik Johansen (Noraprisen, Nye eventyr, I tykt og tynt and Snusk, snadder og gruff). Moreover, she released several albums and toured widely.

Her Hilde Louise Orchestra comprises Jens Fossum (bass), Hermund Nygård (drums), Anders Aarum (piano), Svein Erik Martinsen Ånestad (guitar), as well as Atle Nymo (saxophones) and Kåre Nymark Jr. (trumpet). Before Aarum, Per Husby played piano in the group. She has also been production manager for God kveld, Borge!, Sjel og Showtime and Ett glass til, and established her own production company Sweet Morning Music AS (2008). In 2010 Asbjørnsen contributed to the television series Maestro at NRK 1, and won the Musical Director competition. For her efforts in the production of The Producers at Oslo Nye Teater she was awarded the 2011 Komiprisen in the category best female artist, cabaret and comedy. Her solo cabaret show "The Lulu Show - Life on the Never-Never" opened in November 2015 at Oslo Nye Teater and received raving reviews. She was awarded the 2016 Komiprisen in the category Best female comedian on stage. In August 2017 she performed the show at Edinburgh Fringe and was awarded with a 5/5 stars in Broadwaybaby.com.

== Honors ==
- 2014: Gammleng-prisen in the Open class

== Discography ==
- 2004: Eleven Nights And Two Early Mornings (Bonnier Amigo Music), produced by Per Husby
- 2005: Birdie Blues (UpNorth Discs), with Karin Krog as co-producer
- 2006: No Vil Eg Vake Med Deg (UpNorth Discs), a tribute to Monica Zetterlund, produced by Georg Wadenius
- 2008: Sound Your Horn (Sweet Morning Records), produced by Anders Aarum
- 2010: Never Ever Going Back (Sweet Morning Records), produced by Aarum/Smørdal
- 2011: Divin' At The Oceansound (Sweet Morning Music/Grappa)
- 2012: Månesjuk (Sweet Morning Music/Grappa)
- 2013: 'Round About Christmas (Sweet Morning Music)
- 2014: Sweet Morning Music (Sweet Morning Music/Grappa)
- 2015: Don't Stay For Breakfast (Grappa)

Awards
Preceded by Hilde Marie Kjersem	Recipient of the Open class Gammleng-prisen; 2014	Succeeded by Trio Mediæval
