= Hermund Nygård =

Norwegian jazz drummer and composer

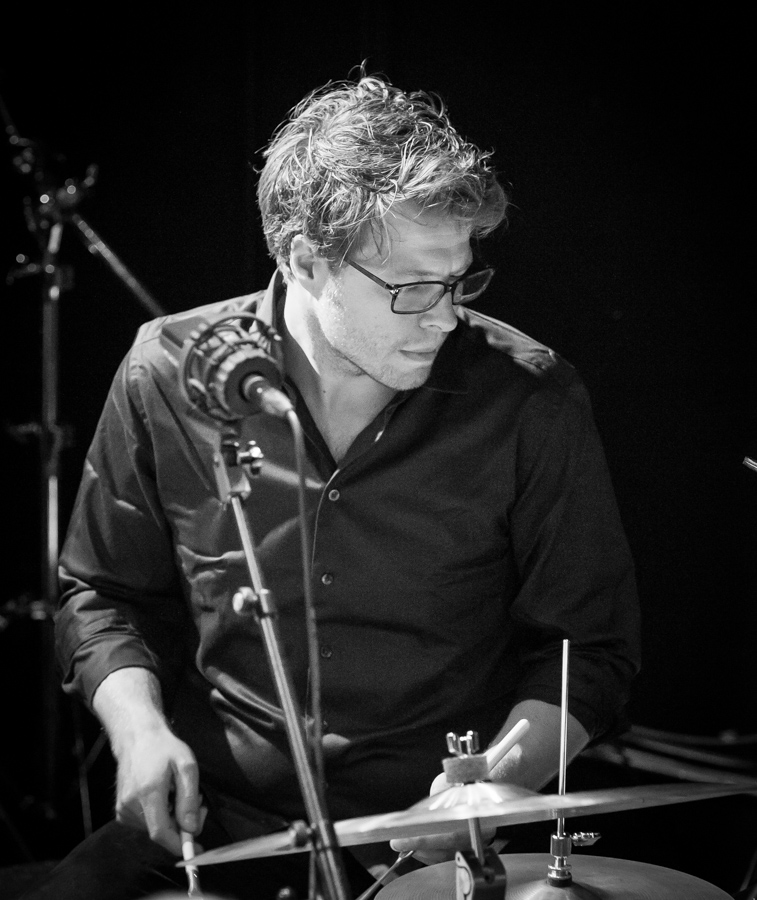
- Hermund Nygård at Oslo Jazzfestival 2016.

Background information
- Born: 16 May 1979 (age 46); Råde, Østfold
- Origin: Norway
- Genres: Jazz
- Occupations: Musician and composer
- Instrument: Drums
- Website: Hermund Nygård on Myspace

Hermund Nygård (born 16 May 1979 in Råde, Norway) is a Norwegian jazz musician (drums) and composer residing in Oslo, known from collaborations with musicians like Hallgeir Pedersen, Staffan William-Olsson, Anders Aarum, Steinar Raknes, Erlend Slettevoll, Magne Thormodsæter, Karin Krog, Bob Dorough and Bobby Shew, and bands like The Real Thing and Sharp9.

== Career ==
Nygård is a graduate of the Jazz program at Trondheim Musikkonservatorium (2005), where he started his own Billington Trio including fellow students Ove Alexander Billington (piano) and Andreas Amundsen (double bass). He has participated in the bands Hubtones, In Front, Platoon, Stjern and Schap9. He is one of the most popular jazz drummers in Norway, who made his mark in many genres. Having worked with numerous artists both in Norway and internationally. He has collaborated on several occasions in the twice Grammy nominated band Sharp 9 Hermund has also worked as an arranger and musical director, among others, with Yngvar Numme, and in the TV show Senkveld with the duo Thomas & Harald.

With his own Hermund Nygård Quintet including with Knut Riisnæs (saxophone), Kevin Dean (trumpet), Anders Aarum (piano) and Audun Ellingsen (bass) gave a concert on 'Herr Nilsen' in 2013.

== Discography ==
- 2004: I Fall in Love Too Easily (Liphone), with Grethe J. Kruse
- 2009: Stompin' Feet (Sweet Recordings), with Julie Dahle Aagård
- 2013: Tranquil Fjord (NorCD), with Audun Ellingsen & Gisle Torvik
