= Hildegunn Øiseth =

Norwegian jazz musician (born 1966)

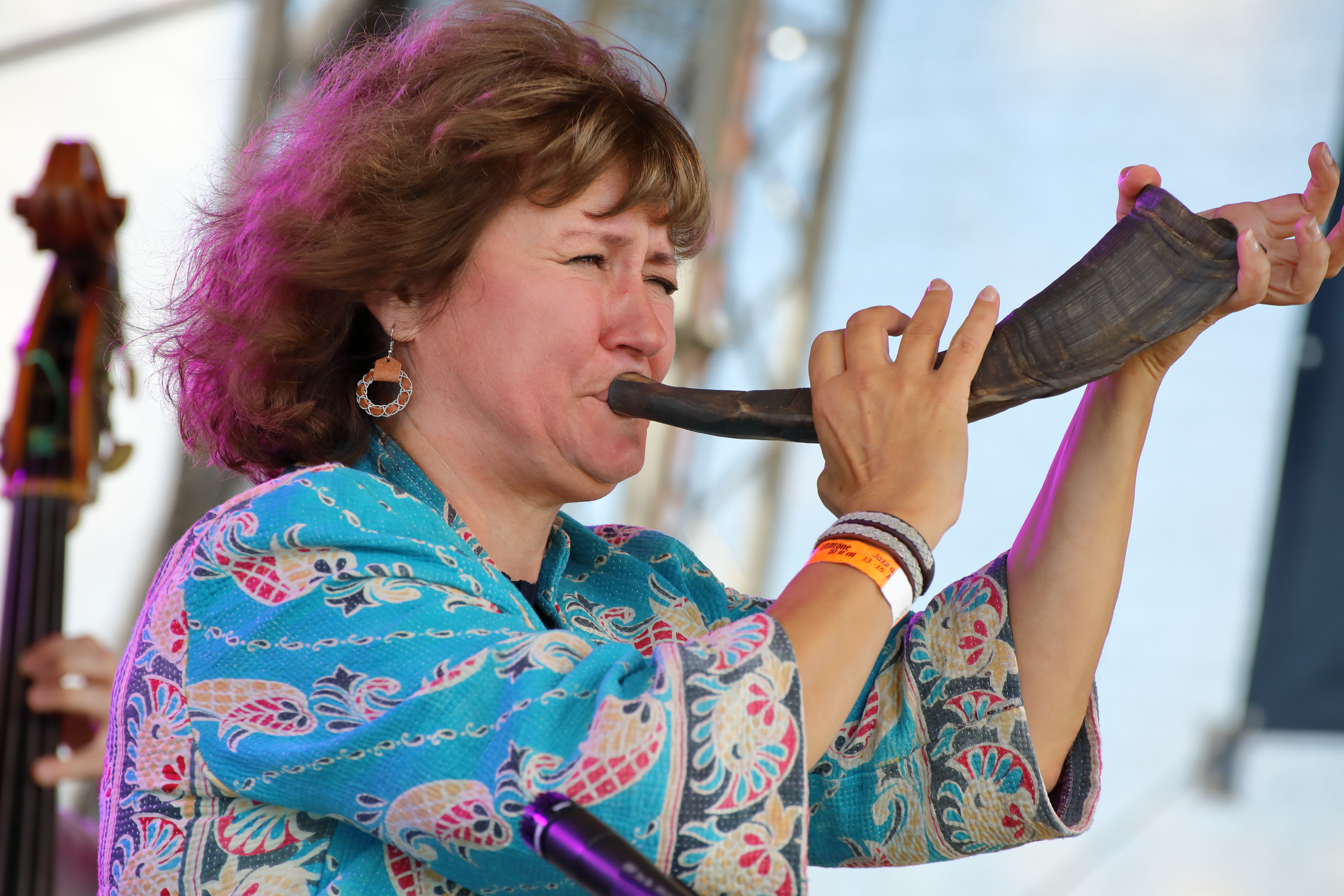

Background information
- Born: 5 December 1966 (age 59); Kongsvinger, Norway
- Genres: Jazz, traditional
- Occupations: Musician, composer
- Instruments: Trumpet, flugelhorn, bukkehorn
- Label: Losen Records
- Website: hildegunn.com

Hildegunn Øiseth (born 5 December 1966 in Kongsvinger, Norway) is a Norwegian jazz musician (trumpet, flugelhorn and bukkehorn).

== Career ==
Øiseth has had a number of appearances in both Norway, South Africa and Pakistan, and was hired as trumpeter in the only professional big band in Scandinavia, Bohuslän Big Band (1990–99). She left this big band to develop her own projects, and established in South Afrika (1999–2001). The stay in Africa resulted in two album releases by the band "Uhambo". She was instructor and artist at The Groove Valley JazzCamp in Beiarn 2007, and released her debut album as a solo artist with the Hildring (2009), focusing on the traditional instrument Bukkehorn instrument. Here she plays with musicians like Helge A. Nordbakken (percussion), Nils-Olav Johansen (guitar/vocal), Paolo Vinaccia (percussion), Eirik-André Rydningen (drums), Karl Oluf Wennerberg (drums), Stein Austrud (vocoder), Majken Christiansen (vocal), Tuva Syvertsen (hardingfele/vocal), Mohdi Ahsan Papu (Pakistani flutes), Tore Brunborg (saxophone), Erlend Gjertsen (keyboards, percussion, world stick), Herman Rundberg (guitar/keyboards/percussion/vocals/world stick) and Svein Schultz (bass/keyboards/world stick). The follow-up, Stillness (2011), received critical acclaim and here she works alternately with Mats Eilertsen (bass), Thomas Strønen (drums) and the pianists Torbjørn Dyrud and Eyolf Dale.

== Discography ==
=== Solo works ===
- 2009: Hildring (MTG Music)
- 2011: Stillness (Losen Records)
- 2014: Valencia (Losen Records)
- 2015: Time Is Coming (Losen Records)
- 2020: Manana (Jazzland Recordings)

=== Collaborative works ===
With Lars Jansson & Bohuslän Big Band

- 1996: The Blue Pearl (Phono Suecia), plays the music of Lars Jansson
- 1998: One Poem, One Painting (Imogena Records)

With other projects

- 2007: Notice (MTG Music), within "Nordic Beat»
- 2008: Lysmannen (Juni Records), with Geirr Lystrup
- 2009: Kissing Fools (Hunter Records), with Stina Stenerud
- 2011: Balggis (Vuelie Records), within "Barut»
- 2011: Migrations (Vuelie Records), with Øyvind Brække & Trondheim Jazz Orchestra
