= Urban Breeze =

2003 studio music album

Studio album by Anders Aarum Ingar Kristiansen Eckhard Baur Odd André Elveland Jens Fossum Torstein Ellingsen
- Released: 2003
- Genre: Jazz
- Length: 49:58
- Label: Tylden & Co
- Producer: Torstein Ellingsen; Ingar Kristiansen

The Swing Pack chronology
| The Sinatra Songbook (2001) | Urban Breeze (2003) |

Urban Breeze (released 2003 in Oslo, Norway by Tylden & Co – GTACD 8223) is an album by the Norwegian jazz band The Swing Pack.

Professional ratings
Review scores
| Source | Rating |
|---|---|
| Dagbladet | 5/6 stars |

== Review ==
Norwegian depth look at the great American songbook has a tendency to end with awkward copies, but this is a shining exception by the sextet The Swing Pack, formerly known as The Sinatra Songbook. With a solid jazz ensemble at all seats they are swinging gracefully through a set of American standards and not to mention a handful of style secure songs from their own production, and fixes both the feather ease and distinct request, as this music requires to work.

The singer Ingar Kristiansen appear as slightly less Sinatra and a little more Kristiansen than on the previous record, which is entirely positive. The album will also offer several brilliant instrumental solos and three great sounding recordings with the Radio Orchestra in impeccable shape.

The review in the Norwegian newspaper Dagbladet awarded the album a perfect score of five dice.

== Track listing ==
1. «Hangin' On to a Lover's Dream» (3:50)
2. «The Most Beautiful Of All» (5:14)
3. «I Wish I Were in Love Again» (6:01)
4. «Playing Her Game» (4:32)
5. «My Heart Stood Still» (2:49)
6. «Darn That Dream» (4:39)
7. «Wizard Of Love» (4:15)
8. «It Never Entered My Mind» (3:05)
9. «Witchcraft» (5:03)
10. «(Love Is) The Tender Trap» (2:30)
11. «Guess I'll Hang My Tears Out To Dry» (3:40)
12. «I Thought About You» (4:01)

== Personnel ==
- Ingar Kristiansen – vocals
- Eckhard Baur – trumpet
- Odd André Elveland – tenor saxophone
- Anders Aarum – piano
- Jens Fossum – double bass
- Torstein Ellingsen – drums

== Credits ==
- Design & photography – Tommy Løland
- Executive producer – Torstein Ellingsen
- Executive producer – Ingar Kristiansen
- Mastered by – Fridtjof A. Lindeman
- Photography – Ole Musken
- Recorded & mixed by – Vidar Lunden

== Notes ==
- Orchestra – Norwegian Radio Orchestra (tracks: 10–12)
