= Majken Christiansen =

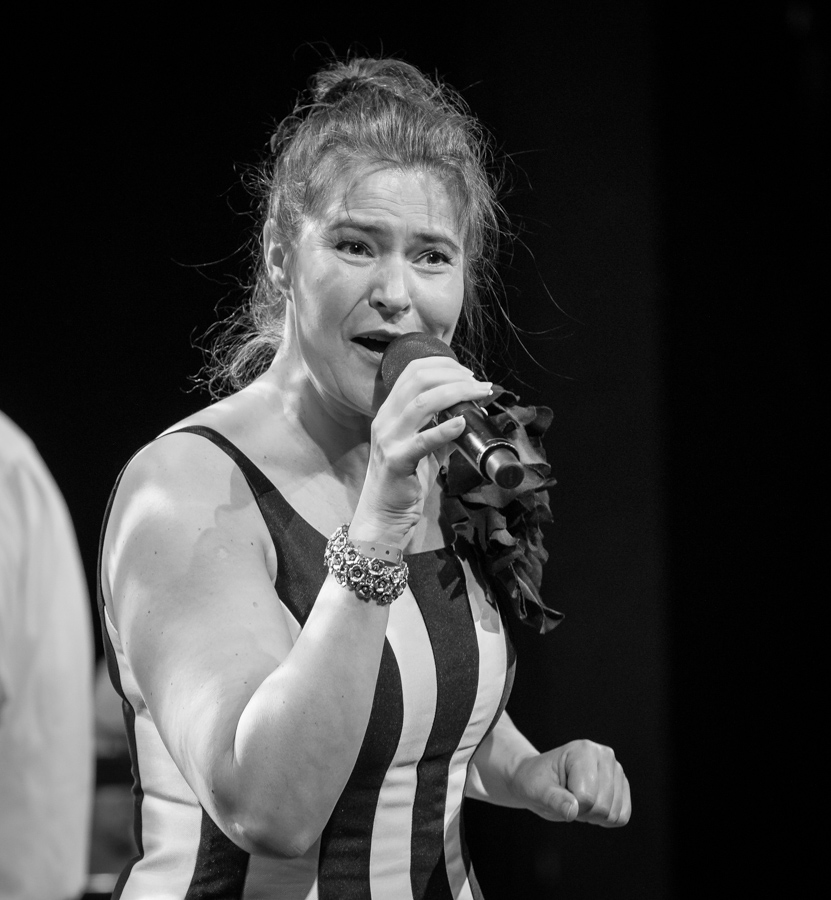
- Christiansen at Chat Noir during the 2017 Oslo Jazzfestival.

Background information
- Born: 14 September 1967 (age 57); Copenhagen, Denmark
- Genres: Jazz
- Occupation(s): Musician, composer
- Instrument: Vocal
- Labels: Hot Club Records
- Website: www.majkenjazz.com

Majken Christiansen (born 14 September 1967) is a Danish jazz vocalist, known from several releases and jazz standard performances.

== Biography ==
Christiansen was born in Copenhagen, Denmark. She led the band Fjeldtetten, including Per Rick, Ebbe Lundgaard, Peter Reimer and Mogens Kann Fjelsøe, releasing several albums from 1992 onwards. After moving to Oslo she released Songs For My Father (2001), dedicated to her father, and Re:porter live at Herr Nilsen (2003) with Anders Aarum, Georg Michael Reiss, Jens Fossum and her husband Torstein Ellingsen, both on Hot Club Records.

She also led the band Swing Society with Tore Sandnæs, Torstein Ellingsen, and Stig Hvalryg, also touring for Rikskonsertene in a show called «Ella Fitzgerald, the first lady of song». Her current Norwegian quintet comprises Frode Kjekstad, Ove Alexander Billington, Stig Hvalryg, and Torstein Ellingsen. Besides, she has played with varied bands, like Magnolia Jazzband, Sandvika Storband, Bodil Niska, David Arthur Skinner, Christiania 12, Det Norske Blåseensemble (with a Duke Ellington show) and Ski Storband.

== Discography ==
=== Solo albums ===
Majken

- 2001: Song For My Father (Hot Club Records)
- 2003: Re:porter (Hot Club Records)
- 2007: Comes Love (Park Grammofon)
- 2011: Speak Love (MJB Records)

=== Collaborations ===
with Fjeldtetten

- 1993: A Tribute To Ella (Fjeldmus)
- 1996: On The Sunny Side, 5 År Med Majken & Fjeltetten - Her Danish Jazzdaddies (Fjeldmus)
- 1998: Pa Viften (Fjeldmus)

with Ski Storband, feat. Majken Christiansen and Frode Kjekstad

- 2009: Ski Loves You... Madly! (Ski Storband)
