= Bigbandblast! =

2004 studio album

Studio album by Jarle Bernhoft Kåre Nymark Jr. Marius Haltli Frode Nymo Atle Nymo Børge-Are Halvorsen Even Kruse Skatrud Nils-Olav Johansen Frode Kjekstad Jens Thoresen Stian Carstensen Anders Aarum Palle Wagnberg Jens Fossum Børre Dalhaug
- Released: 24 August 2004
- Genre: Rock/jazz
- Length: 57:08
- Label: Real Music Records

Bigbandblast! (released 24 August 2004 by Real Music Records in Oslo) is an album by the big band Bigbandblast led by Børre Dalhaug.

== Reception ==
Professional ratings
Review scores
| Source | Rating |
|---|---|
| Bergens Tidende | 5/6 stars |

Bigbandblast! sounds like the drummer of The Real Thing has assembled a hard-swinging big band, with stylistically eclectic choice of music, like Latin, backbeat, swing and heavy metal, but the common thread is preserved in that it is the same musicians playing on all the tracks. It was nominated for Spellemannprisen 2004, and received splendid reviews in the press.

The review by the Norwegian newspaper Bergens Tidende awarded the album 5 stars (dice).

== Track listing ==
1. "Shoeshine Shuffle" (5:14)
2. "Up Front" (6:48)
3. "Moving On" (4:48)
4. "The Real Thing" (4:57)
5. "Gaudium Reditus" (5:09)
6. "Schmell" (5:34)
7. "Adaptive" (5:19)
8. "Roger That" (5:28)
9. "Ad Infinitum" (6:13)
10. "Utopia" (4:36)
11. "The Real Thing" (3:02)

== Personnel ==
- Jarle Bernhoft – vocals
- Kåre Nymark Jr. – trumpet
- Marius Haltli – trumpet
- Frode Nymo – alt saxophone
- Atle Nymo – tenor saxophone
- Børge-Are Halvorsen – saxophones & flute
- Even Kruse Skatrud – trombone
- Nils-Olav Johansen – guitar
- Frode Kjekstad – guitar
- Jens Thoresen – guitar
- Stian Carstensen – accordion
- Anders Aarum – piano
- Palle Wagnberg – Hammond B3 organ
- Jens Fossum – double bass
- Børre Dalhaug – drums

== Credits ==
- Compositions and lyrics by Børre Dalhaug
