= Atle Nymo =

Norwegian jazz saxophonist

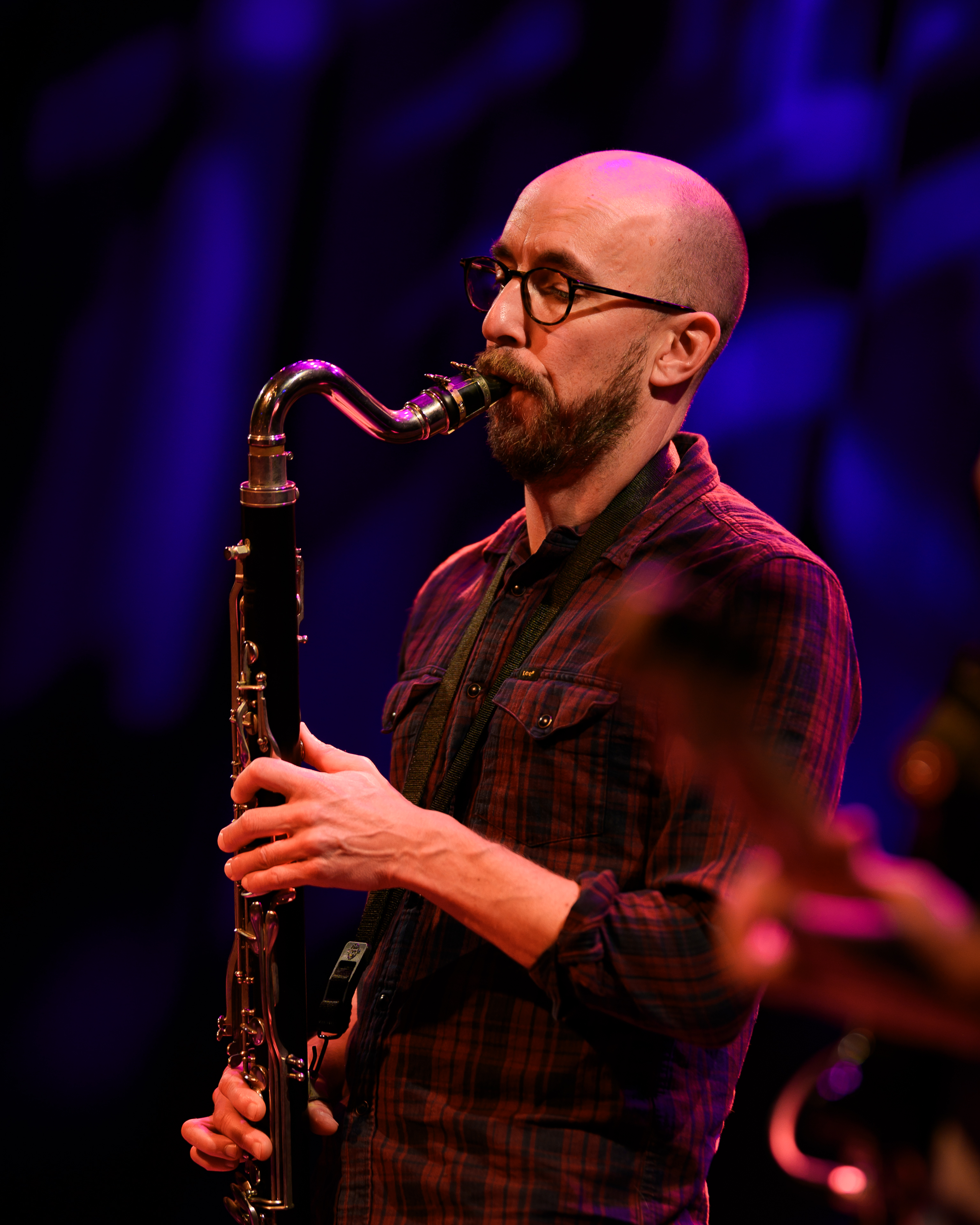
- Nymo live in 2025 (Photo: Birgit Fostervold)

Background information
- Born: 9 July 1977 (age 49); Valnesfjord, Norway
- Origin: Norway
- Genres: Jazz
- Occupations: Musician, composer, band leader
- Instruments: Saxophone, bass clarinet
- Labels: Jazzland Records; Bolage; Taurus Records
- Website: nmh.no/om_musikkhogskolen/ansatte/atle_nymo

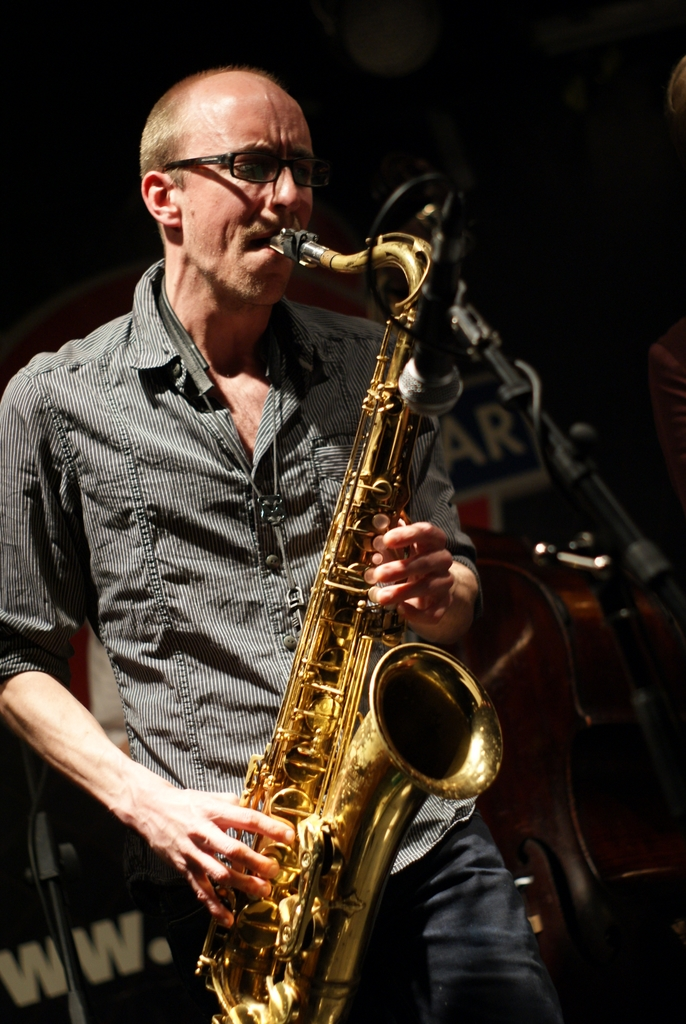
Nymo live with Motif at the Metro Music Bar; Jazz Fest Brno, 22 April 2010. (Photo: Peter Stračina)

Atle Nymo (born 9 June 1977) is a Norwegian jazz musician (tenor saxophone and bass clarinet), and the younger brother of Jazz saxophonist Frode Nymo. He is known for his contributions with the orchestras Motif, one of his main projects, and Trondheim Jazz Orchestra in which he has worked with Jazz greats like Pat Metheny and Chick Corea.

== Career ==
Nymo was born in Valnesfjord in Fauske Municipality. He joined the Bodø Big Band, led by his teacher Henning Gravrok, and was later educated on the Jazz program at Trondheim Musikkonservatorium, and has also played in Håvard Stubø's Quintet North. The later years He has played with Ole Morten Vågan's band Motif where he was to be named «Young Jazz Comets» 2001 at Copenhagen Jazz Festival. In «next MGN Trio» he cooperates with Mats Monstad and Ketil Gutvik, and in the latter band «Gutvik5». Otherwise, and also played with Kaizers Orchestra.

Nymo also has his own album release with «Atle Nymo & Frode Nymo Quartet» (Håkon Mjåset Johansen drums and Ole Morten Vågan bass). In his own band «Atle Nymo Quartet» he cooperates with Vigleik Storaas (piano), Magnus Forsberg (drums) and Ole Morten Vågan (bass). The first mentioned played in Quintet with guest Roger Kellaway (piano), and they released an album Inner Urge in 2001 with concert recordings from «Oslo Jazz Festival». Together with Ingebrigt Håker Flaten and Håkon Mjåset Johansen he made the album Complete communion in 2006, and with the Swedish trumpet player Magnus Broo as the fourth member, the group was called IPA and they have released the albums Lorena (2009), It's A Delicate Thing (2011) and Bubble (2013). He is also involved in two other band projects «Saxwaffe» (Frode Nymo, Klaus Holm, Eirik Hegdal, Espen Reinertsen) and «Juxtaposed» (Petter Vågan, Erik Nylander, Ole Morten Vågan)

Nymo is a frequently used big band musician and is attending such as the drummer Børre Dalhaugs «Big Band Blast» (2004) and trombonist & composer Helge Sundes «Denada» (2005), and was from 2002 to 2003 a member of Geir Lysne Listening Ensemble. He also played in Trondheim Jazz Orchestra, and attended the orchestra's cooperation projects with Chick Corea in 2000/2001 (Moldejazz) and Pat Metheny in 2003.

== Honors ==
- «Young Jazz Comets» 2001 ved Copenhagen Jazz Festival, with the band Motif

== Discography ==
With «Atle Nymo & Frode Nymo Quartet»

- 2004: Inner Urge – (Gemini Records/Taurus Records), live at «Oslo Jazz Festival» in 2002, with Roger Kellaway piano (compositions by Joe Henderson, Chick Corea and Sonny Rollins

Within Børre Dalhaug's «Bigbandblast»

- 2004: Bigbandblast! (Real Records)

With Motif

- 2005: Motif (AIM Music Prod.)
- 2005: Expansion (AIM Music Prod.)
- 2008: Apo Calypso (Jazzland Records)
- 2008: Hello..my name is (Vidzone)
- 2010: Facienda (Jazzland Records), triple album
- 2011: Art Transplant (Clean Feed), with Axel Dörner
- 2016: My Head Is Listening (Clean Feed)

Within Trondheim Jazz Orchestra

- 2005: Live in Molde (MNJ Records), with Chick Corea

Within IPA including with Magnus Broo, Håkon Mjåset Johansen & Ingebrigt Håker Flaten

- 2009: Lorena (Bolage)
- 2011: It's A Delicate Thing (Bolage)
- 2013: Bubble (Moserobie), feat. Mattias Ståhl

Within The Rainbow Band

- 2011: The Rainbow Band Sessions (Losen Records), directed by John Surman

Within Kåre Nymark Band

- 2012: New Surroundings (Schmell)

Within Hilde Louise Asbjørnsen

- 2012: Månesjuk (Sweet Morning Music/Grappa Music)
