= Science theatre =

Genre of theater

dedão

Teatro Científico

Science theatre is a form of theatre or set of performances in which science is central. It aims to give insight into the essence or impact of science by stimulating thinking about science or the societal impact of science.

== Examples ==
Within science theatre, several approaches exist. Roughly speaking, a distinction can be made between

- the genres in which science or technology is more or less a subject and theatrical goals are central
- the genres in which science or technology is central and theatre is a more or less accidental means of stimulating the understanding of the artefacts, methodology, concepts and functioning of science and technology
- the genres in which science or technology is central and theatre is a more or less accidental means of stimulating the understanding of and discussion on societal functioning, meaning and impact of science and technology

A famous representative of the first genre is the piece Copenhagen by Michael Frayn. Examples of the second genre are pieces by chemist and Nobel Prize winner Carl Djerassi, while pieces by the English science theater group Y-touring fit into the third genre. The latter has been visiting successful secondary schools for years with pieces about, for example, xenotransplantation to bring influential developments in science into contact. The use of role plays and simulations about science and society in secondary and higher education also falls under the second genre.

There are also many intermediate forms, such as Lehrstücke, by Bertolt Brecht, who wanted to combine art and education.

In several countries, special science theatre groups or institutions can be found, sometimes as parts of universities or museums. In the US, the group Science Theatre exists, part of MSA, for education tasks. In UK Y-touring has a long tradition, as well as the group Science Theatre, which performs science shows for various audiences, making use of expert knowledge of science and techniques from stage performance.

In the Netherlands, the group Pandemonia existed for several decades, which played pieces at schools, in museums and at scientific symposiums. Pieces dealt with 'manufacturable people', food and genomics and nanotechnology.

The Dutch multidisciplinary ensemble Theater Adhoc is completely different in nature, and focuses on depicting current developments in the (natural) sciences. Under the motto 'Reality is too interesting to be left to the realists', Theater Adhoc stages dialogues between art and science.

In Belgium, the group Crew tries to create surprising theatre with modern means from science and technology.

== See also ==
- Public awareness of science
- Science outreach
