= Audun Ellingsen =

Norwegian jazz upright bassist

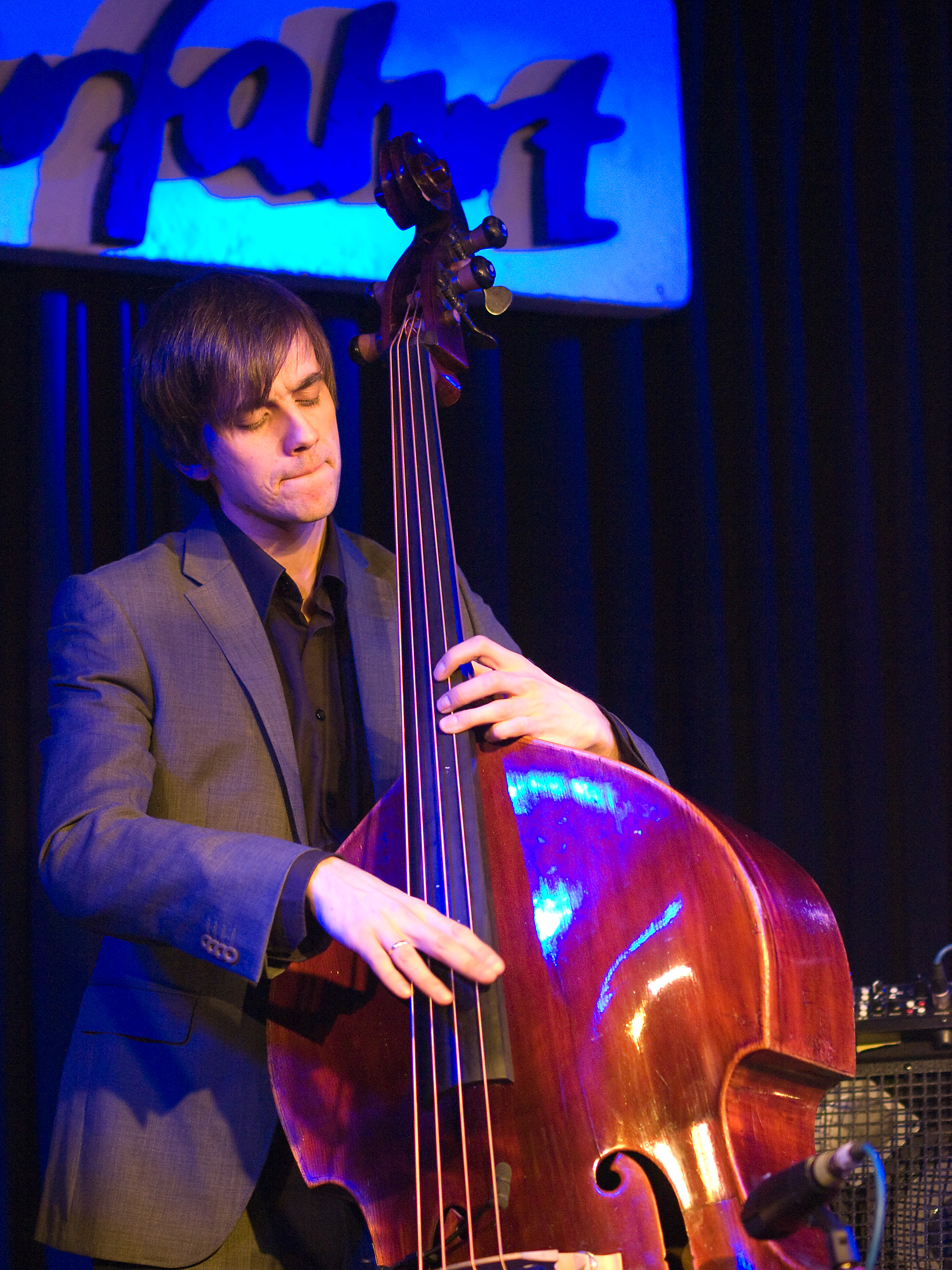
- Ellingsen with Frøy Aagre live at the Jazz Club Unterfahrt, March 17, 2010.

Background information
- Born: 4 January 1979 (age 47); Ørsta, Møre og Romsdal
- Origin: Norway
- Genres: Jazz
- Occupation: Musician
- Instrument: Upright bass
- Website: www.audunellingsen.no

Audun Ellingsen (born 4 January 1979) is a Norwegian jazz musician (Upright bass) known from collaborations within bands like "Sphinx" and with musicians like Frøy Aagre, Erlend Slettevoll and Gisle Torvik.

== Career ==
Ellingsen was born in Ørsta Municipality and started studying classical piano as a child, but substituted the piano with an electric bass guitar at ten, in order to play in local rock bands. Jazz came to be the main musical focus when he went to the musical program at high school in 1998, and he picked up the double bass. After graduation he attended musical studies at Toneheim Folkehøgskole for one year, followed by studies on the jazzprogram at Leeds College of Music (1999) under guidance of Stuart Riley and Zoltan Dekaney. Ellingsen took a Bachelor of Arts in Jazz Studies and got a Masters of Music degree in 2004.

During the time in Leeds Ellingsen played in various bands and local rhythm sections comping touring British and American soloists like Mark Nightingale, Joe Temperly, Alan Barnes and Red Holloway. One of his main projects, “Sphinx” with David Arthur Skinner, was founded in this period and we started recording Cds and touring England and Norway. He also was involved in the very active free jazz and improvisation scene in Leeds. After graduation in Leeds he established himself as a professional musician based in Oslo.

Ellingsen has been touring jazzclubs and festivals in Norway, Finland, Denmark, Sweden, Germany, Greece, France, United Kingdom, Belgium, Slovakia, China and Japan with bands like Frøy Aagre, Arch70, Sphinx, Audun Automat. As a freelance musician he has been playing various styles of jazz with the likes of Kenny Wheeler, Tomasz Stanko, Bobo Stenson, Andy Sheppard, Hot Club de Norvege, Petter Wettre, Staffan William-Olsson, KORK (Norwegian Broadcasting Orchestra), Morten Gunnar Larsen and Matt Bourne.

== Discography (in selection) ==
=== Solo albums ===
With Audun Automat

- 2008: Night Creatures (Pling Music)
- 2011: Inside the Beehive (Pling Music)

=== Collaborations ===
With Sphinx

- 2002: Speaks The Riddle ... (Acoustica)
- 2004: Sweet Maladies (Acoustica), trio featuring Petter Wettre
- 2007: Bohemian Sketches (AIM Records)
- 2011: Harmonogram (Pling Music), quartet

With Frøy Aagre

- 2006: Countryside (AIM Records), within Offbeat
- 2010: Cycle Of Silence (ACT Records)

With Arch70

- 2010: Arch70 (Pling Music)

With Georg Reiss Quartet

- 2010: For All We Know (MJB Records)

With Gjermund Sivertsen Trio

- 2011: Existence (Pling Music)

With Per Frydenlund

- 2011: Tristeza og Happy Hour (Hot Club Records)

With Gisle Torvik

- 2013: Tranquil Fjord (Ozella Music/NorCD), with Hermund Nygård
