= Torstein Ellingsen =

Norwegian drummer and music producer

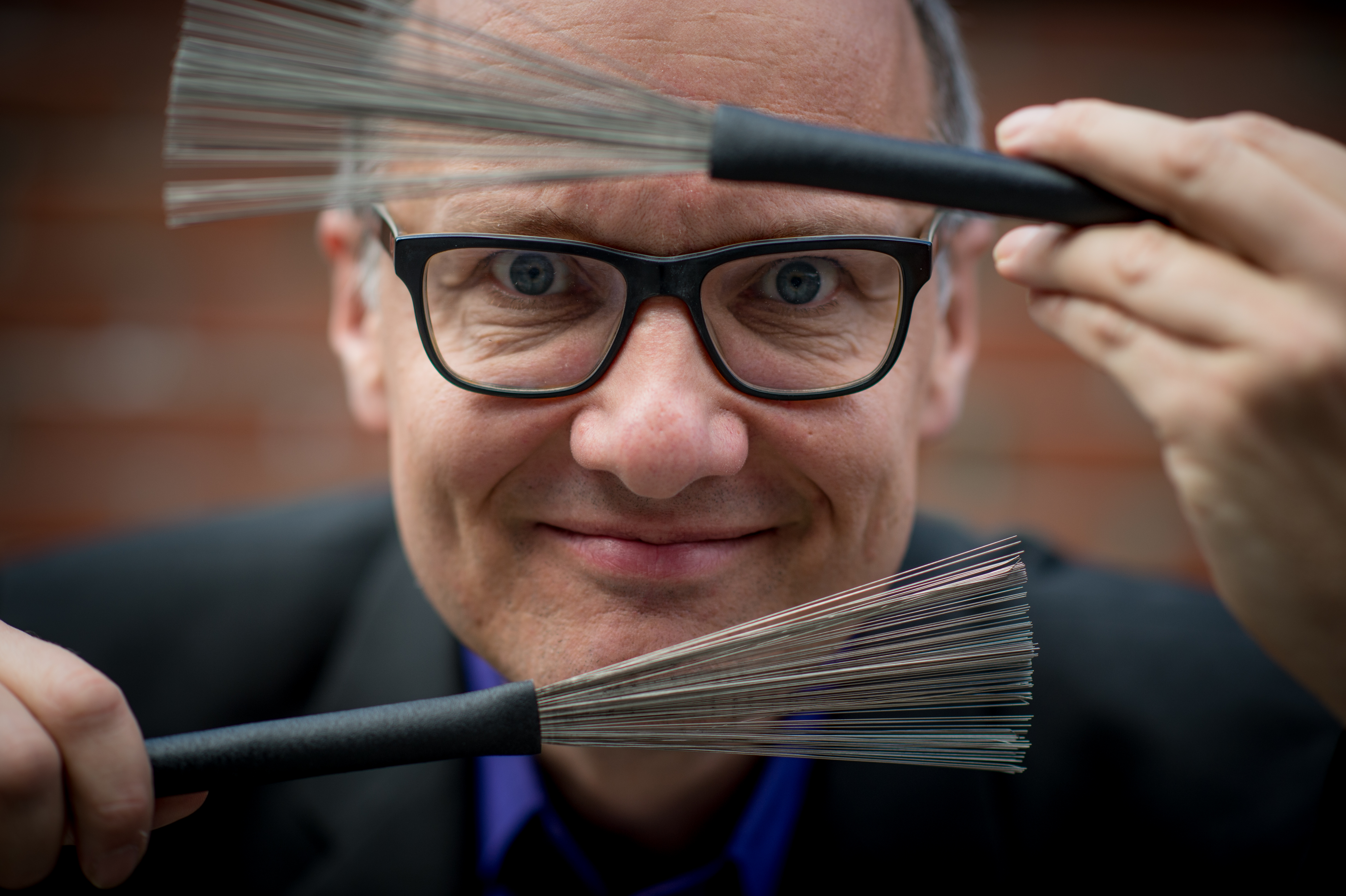

Background information
- Born: 7 August 1966 (age 59); Oslo
- Origin: Norway
- Genres: Jazz
- Occupations: Musician, music producer, teacher
- Instrument: Drums
- Website: www.jazzprovider.com

Torstein Ellingsen (born 7 August 1966) is a Norwegian drummer and music producer, known from a series of album recordings.

== Early life and career ==
Ellingsen was born in Oslo and started his career playing in his older brother's band The Royal Rakes Jazzband (1980), collaborated within Christiania Jazzband (1981), and was a part of "Caledonia Jazzband" (1982–1998), with The Real Thing (1995–1998 og 2010–2014), with Magnolia Jazzband (from 1999), and with his Danish wife and singer Majken Christiansen (from 2001). Ellingsen lead his own band, The Sinatra Songbook (from 1999), along with jazz singer Ingar Kristiansen. He plays in these bands: Prima Vista Social Club, Rubber Soul Quartet and Gigaphonics. He has also recorded albums with Paul Wagnberg Trio, Rune Nicolaysen Trio, Anders Aarum Trio, Tor Einar Bekken, Sandvika Storband, Ola Kvernberg, Harald Bergersen, Anne Marte Slinning and Jan Werner. He has also collaborated with musicians like Sigurd Køhn, Georg Reiss, Norbert Susemihl, Halvdan Sivertsen and Øystein Sunde.

Ellingsen holds a master's degree in political science at the University of Oslo (1994) and diploma degree in Music Management from Det Jyske Musikkonservatorium in Århus, Denmark (2012). He was the host of the TV program "Bandbox" at NRK (1997), worked as a jazz writer and editor of the jazz magazine Jazznytt (2001–02). He also was a communications consultant in Rikskonsertene in Oslo (1998–2001) and was employed as a concert producer the same place until 2016 where he facilitates concerts for children and young audiences. Ellingsen has published the norwegian language book Rosinen i pølsa (Kagge, 2005) with Knut Lystad and Rune Semundseth.

== Discography (in selection) ==
=== Solo albums ===
- 2001: The Sinatra Songbook (Curling Legs).

=== Collaborations ===
==== With Caledonia Jazzband ====
- 1985: Moods of New Orleans (Hot Club Records)
- 1987: Walkin' (Hot Club Records), with Wendell Brunious
- 1991: Is You Or Is You Ain't (Hot Club Records), with Norbert Susemihl
- 1997: Creole Nights (Hot Club Records), with Geoff Bull

==== With Garden of Delight ====
- 1987: Big Wheels in Emotion (Pale Productions)

==== With The Real Thing ====
- 1995: Live (Real Records)
- 1997: Pleasure Is An Attitude (Real Records)
- 2011: Back on Track (Real Records)

==== With Sandvika Storband ====
- 1999: Lining Up! (SS Records)

==== With Ola Kvernberg ====
- 2001: Violin (Hot Club Records)

==== With Paul Wagnberg Trio ====
- 1999: Eat Meat (Real Records)
- 2001: Gone Fishing (Real Records)

==== With Anders Aarum Trio ====
- 2001: The Lucky Strike (Hot Club Records)

==== With Magnolia Jazzband ====
- 2002: In that Sweet Old Garden of Eden (MJB Recordings)

==== With Norbert Susemihl ====
- 2011: Norbert Susemihl's Joyful Gumbo – New Orleans Reflections (Sumi Records)
- 2014: Norbert Susemihl – A Tribute to the Louis Armstrong All Stars – Live at Maribo Jazzfestival (Sumi Records)
