= David Gald =

Norwegian Jazz musician (born 1968)

- Born: 10 July 1968 (age 57); Stryn Municipality, Sogn og Fjordane
- Origin: Norway
- Genres: Jazz
- Occupations: Musician, composer
- Instrument: Tuba
- Label: Sonor Records
- Website: Funky Butt; Nymark Collective; Gumbo; Ytre Suløens Jass-Ensemble

David Gald (born 10 July 1968 in Stryn Municipality, Norway) is a Norwegian Jazz musician (tuba), known for collaborations with such musicians as Bjørn Alterhaug, Arve Henriksen and Trygve Seim and on a series of album releases.

== Career ==
Gald established the jazz band Riverside Jazz Ensemble together with Arve Henriksen, inspired by the Ytre Suløens Jass-ensemble, which he later participated on many recordings with (1992–). After attending the Toneheim folkehøgskole (1988–89) he studied jazz on Jazz program at Trondheim Musikkonsevatorium (1989–95), and collaborated within the Bodega Band, Aggravatin Papa and Trondhjems Kunstorkester. Later he worked with Oslo Groove Company, Trygve Seim Orchestra on Different Rivers (2000), and within 1300 Oslo, and has since 2000 toured with Rikskonsertene in the production Gumbo, releasing the album Gumbo (2005). He has participated om about 20 albums, and is today (2013) member of the jazz orchestras Ytre Suløens Jass-Ensemble, Funky Butt and Gumbo.

== Discography ==
With Bjørn Alterhaug

- 1991: Constellations (Odin Records)

Within Epinastic Movements

- 1993: Rapid (Pop Eye)

Within Ytre Suløens Jass-Ensemble

- 1994: Where the Blue of the Night Meets the Gold of the Day
- 1996: Art Deco
- 1997: In Concert – the Weary Blues
- 1999: Blue River (Herman Records)
- 2005: Memories of New Orleans – 30 Years of Recorded History

With Trygve Seim

- 2000: Different Rivers (ECM Records), feat. Arve Henriksen, Håvard Lund & Hild Sofie Tafjord

Within Funky Butt

- 2001: Whoopin' (Sonor Records)
- 2003: The Glove (Sonor Records)
- 2005: Big Mama (Schmell Records)
- 2007: Shakin' da Butt (Schmell Records)

Within Gumbo

- 2006: Gumbo (Schmell Records)
