= Børre Dalhaug =

Norwegian jazz drummer, arranger and instructor

- Born: 29 April 1974 (age 52); Ålesund, Sunnmøre
- Origin: Norway
- Genre: Jazz
- Occupations: Musician, composer
- Instruments: Drums, percussion
- Label: Real Records
- Formerly of: The Real Thing
- Website: moremusikarane.no/Moeremusikarane/Frilansere/Boerre-Dalhaug

Børre Dalhaug (born 29 April 1974 in Ålesund, Norway) is a Norwegian jazz musician (drums), music arranger and music instructor.

== Career ==
Dalhaug has worked as a musician since 1995 and done around 800 concerts with bands like The Real Thing, Staffan William-Olsson Sextet, Nora Brockstedt, Oslo Groove Company, Bohuslän Big Band among others. He has performed in Pakistan, India, Russia, France, Germany, Finland, Sweden and Denmark and participates on a number of albums.

He released the Spellemannprisen nominated big band album BigBandBlast! (2004), and leads his own big band called «Børre Dalhaugs Bigbandblast» in addition to being a sideman in numerous projects. Børre also works as a composer and arranger. He also has a college degree in computer engineering.

== Discography ==
=== Solo albums ===
- 2004: Bigbandblast! (Real Records), «Børre Dalhaugs Bigbandblast» includes Kåre Nymark Jr., Nils-Olav Johansen, Stian Carstensen & Palle Wagnberg

=== Collaborative works ===
Within The Real Thing

- 2000: Deluxe (Real Music Records), with Even Kruse Skatrud and the Norwegian Radio Orchestra
- 2003: New Wrapping (Real Music Records)
- 2006: A Real Christmas (Real Music Records), feat. vocalist Sigrid Brennhaug

With other projects

- 2000: Oak Road Boogaloo (Real Music Records), within Staffan William-Olsson Sextet
- 2005: Eveneven Big Band (Schmell), with Even Kruse Skatrud & «Eveneven Big Band»
