= Science Theatre (Michigan State University) =

Science Theatre is an undergraduate student-run science outreach organization at Michigan State University's East Lansing campus, performing science theatre. Science Theatre visits schools and events throughout Michigan performing interactive science demonstrations for K-12 students on-stage or up-close. Science Theatre performers are undergraduate and graduate student volunteers and all performances are made free of charge.

The group's performances consist of arrangements from its catalog of more than seventy demonstrations in biology, chemistry, and physics. Additionally, Science Theatre performs comprehensive shows in Astronomy, Environmental science, Pressure, the Periodic Table, Quantum Mechanics, and FRIB-related science.

Science Theatre was founded in April 1991 under a grant from the National Science Foundation and received the 1993 AAAS Award for Public Understanding of Science and Technology. Science Theatre is a four-time winner of the Outreach Award from the Michigan State University Department of Physics and Astronomy.
