= Funky Butt (band) =

Norwegian jazz band

- Origin: Oslo, Norway
- Genres: Jazz
- Years active: 2000–present
- Labels: Sonor, Schmell
- Members: Vidar Sæther; Kåre Nymark; Even Kruse Skatrud; David Gald; Anders Aarum; Knut Lothe
- Website: www.funkybutt.no

Funky Butt is a Norwegian jazz band inspired by New Orleans Jazz. About their music it is said it is a funky brass band with piano added, offering New Orleans music with a Nordic perspective. It is a melting pot of traditional jazz, Caribbean influences, tango, hard bop, and contemporary grooves. It embraces lyrical beauty and fresh phrasing. It involves strong soloing and respectful collective playing.

== Personnel ==
- Vidar Sæther – saxophone
- Kåre Nymark – trumpet
- Even Kruse Skatrud – trombone
- David Gald – tuba
- Anders Aarum – piano
- Knut Lothe – drums

== Discography ==
- 2001: Whoopin' (Sonor)
- 2002: The Glove (Sonor)
- 2005: Big Mama (Schmell)
- 2007: Shakin' da butt (Schmell)
