= Frode Kjekstad =

- Born: 23 November 1974 (age 51); Lier, Norway
- Genres: Jazz
- Occupations: Musician, composer
- Instrument: Guitar
- Label: Curling Legs
- Website: www.frodekjekstad.com

Frode Kjekstad is a Norwegian jazz guitarist and known from collaboration and recordings with jazz musicians Lonnie Smith, Eric Alexander, Mike LeDonne, Joe Farnsworth, Byron Landham, Alberto Marsico, Frank Foster, Johnny Griffin, Don Menza, James Morrison, Mark Nightingale, Claire Martin, Deborah Brown, and Wendell Brunious.

He has performed at clubs like Ronnie Scott's in London and Smoke in New York.

Kjekstad is known for a virtuoso way of playing the guitar, and has done many projects in the guitar/organ/drums trio concept, but also solo, duo, trio and all kind of combos. His style is influenced by different horn players and piano players, exemplified by counterpoint chord melodies, and swinging bass lines in his solo and duo work with singers and horn players. His own projects can be seen as "post-bop", "hard-bop", or "neo-bop", based in the American Blue Note tradition, but also heavy influenced by Italian and European music. He has also composed and arranged several tunes and "jazz suites" for big band.

Kjekstad grew up in the Norvegian countryside just outside Oslo, in the Lier valley.

He was soon captured by the music of Charlie Parker, and this led him into John Coltrane, McCoy Tyner, Bill Evans and guitarists Joe Pass and Pat Martino. At young age, he was also a promising operatic tenor, (studying with the internationally acclaimed Norwegian opera star Marit Isene) but chose to concentrate on the guitar as his career developed in that direction. Kjekstad's harmonic and melodic concepts on the guitar is also inspired by the strong melodies and chords used by operatic composers like Puccini, Massenet and others.

== Career ==
Playing in the Sandvika Bigband in the late 1990s; at that time considered to be Norway's best Big Band, Kjekstad got the opportunity to meet and play with a lot of legendary American and European jazz musicians. In 1999, at age 24, he was asked to join Swedish B3 organ player Paul Wagnberg's Organ Unit trio. This position established Kjekstad as one of the top jazz guitar players in Norway, and made him grow a good reputation, leading to all kinds of other gigs. In 2000 he recorded his unofficial first CD “Presenting Frode Kjekstad”, with Paul Wagnberg (B3) and Børre Dalhaug (drums). This CD got great reviews in USA and Italy: “This young genius has a perfect sense of time and rhythm” (Frank Forte, Just Jazz Guitar 2001).

After meeting New York based jazz guitarist Randy Johnston in the 1990s, he got the possibility to record his first official solo album “New York Time” in February 2002. This album was recorded in New York with Dr. Lonnie Smith and drummer Byron Landham, and with saxophonist Eric Alexander on three tunes. The band set a new record in the studio for making an album in shortest time (about 3 hours), with a lot of extra time left for socializing and sharing stories from Lonnie Smith's career. The CD “New York Time”, released in 2004, opened up doors all over the world, and led to many new collaborations and journeys. In 2003 Kjekstad also married jazz singer Aina Fridén, and had three kids.

In 2008 Kjekstad recorded a trio album with Norwegian super bass player Per Mathisen and drummer Ole Morten Summer, that was never released, due to too much work, and financial problems. Some of these tunes can be found on YouTube.

In 2012 Kjekstad hooked up with Italians drummer Enzo Zirilli and organist Alberto Marsico. They recorded the album “Frode Kjekstad: The Italian Job” and played gigs around Europe.

After doing a tour with old friend sax player Eric Alexander in 2013, Kjekstad was invited to play some gigs at the club Smoke in New York with the legendary organ quartet “Mike LeDonne´s Groover Quartet” featuring Eric Alexander, B3 player Mike LeDonne and drummer Joe Farnsworth. Regular guitarist Peter Bernstein was out of town. Kjekstad also booked a studio to make a new CD with this band. The result was “Frode Kjekstad: A Piece Of The Apple”, released in 2017.

In October 2019 Kjekstad recorded a new trio album in Norway, featuring Norwegian bass player Frode Berg and the drummer Magnus Sefaniassen Eide. The CD is called “Frode Kjekstad: In Essence”, and will be released in December 2019.

Guitars: Kjekstad bought a blond 1983 Gibson ES-175D with mahogany body in 1992, and played only this guitar until 2016. In 2016 he got a 1974 Gibson Johnny Smith, which now is his main instrument.

== Honors ==
- 2013: Asker Jazzklubb honorary award

== Discography ==
=== Solo albums ===
- 2000: "Presenting Frode Kjekstad" with Paul Wagnberg, Børre Dalhaug and Torstein Ellingsen
- 2004: New York Time (Curling Legs), with Lonnie Smith, Eric Alexander & Byron Landham
- 2012: The Italian Job (Curling Legs), with Alberto Marsico & Enzo Zirilli
- 2017: "A Piece Of The Apple" (Losen Records), with Eric Alexander, Mike LeDonne and Joe Farnsworth
- 2019: "Frode Kjekstad: In Essence" (Losen Records) with Frode Berg(bass) and Magnus Sefaniassen Eide (drums)

=== Collaborations ===
- 1999: Lining Up! (SS Records), with "Sandvika Storband"
- 2003: Songs After You (Runar Andersen Records), with Runar Andersen & Janne Kjellsen
- 2004: Bigbandblast! (Real Records), within Børre Dalhaug's "Bigbandblast"
- 2005: Live at Bærum Kulturhus (Trumpet Jungle), with Sandvika Storband
- 2007: Comes Love (Park Grammofon), with Majken Christiansen
- 2009: Ski Loves You ... Madly! (daWorks Entertainment), with Majken Christiansen & "Ski Storband"
