= Petter Vågan =

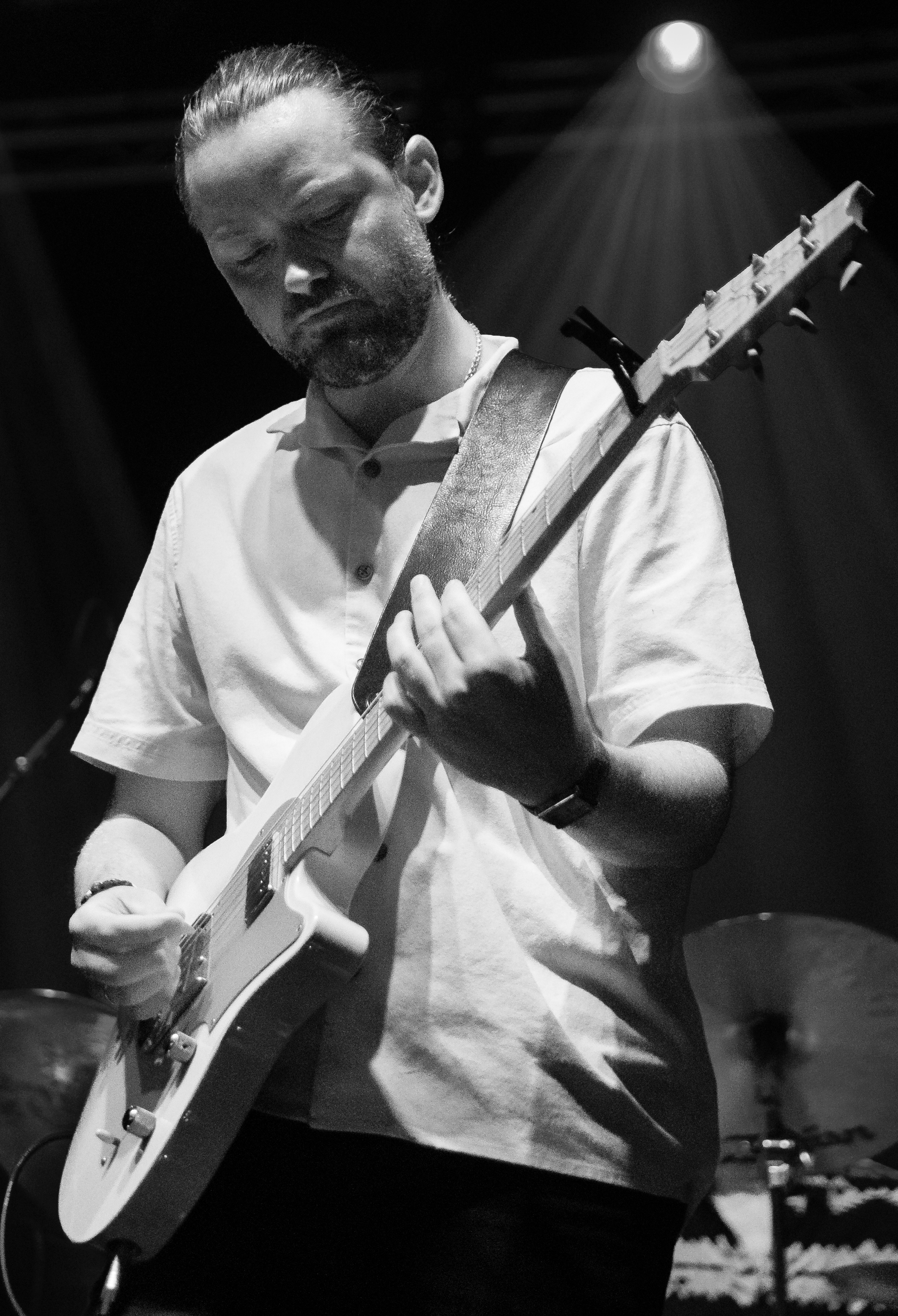
- Petter Vågan performing at Sentrum Scene, Oslo 2024; Photo: Tore Sætre

Background information
- Born: 6 July 1982; Brønnøysund, Norway
- Genres: Pop; electronica; free improvisation; jazz
- Occupation: Musician
- Instruments: Vocals, guitar
- Label: Propeller
- Member of: The Fjords
- Website: pettervagan.com

Petter Vågan (born 6 July 1982 in Brønnøysund, Northern Norway) is a Norwegian singer, guitarist, composer, and the younger brother of double bass player Ole Morten Vågan. He is the bandleader, singer, and guitarist of the Norwegian indie electronica band The Fjords, founded in 2013.

== Career ==
Vågan is based in Trondheim, where he got a performing master's degree in improvisation at the Jazz Dept at Trondheim Musikkonservatorium. In addition to his latest endeavours in pop music, he has delved into various forms of improvisation. He has released several records as a leader and band member with an experimental style rooted somewhere between electronic music, free jazz, rock, free improvisation, and noise music.

He has toured extensively in Scandinavia, Russia, U.S., Japan, South Africa, Canada, Germany, and the Netherlands, and collaborated with many improvising musicians in Norway.

== Discography ==
- 2006: Slant of Light (Jazzaway), within Eyewaterlillies
- 2007: Selected Recordings (Parallell), within Peloton
- 2008: That is a Step (FMR), within duo Petter O Hanna (Hanna Gjermundrød)
- 2009: Trondheim Jazz Orchestra & Kobert (MNJ)
- 2010: "Shapes & Phases" (Sofa), Vertex
- 2010: A festa Vale Tudo (Parallell), within Erik Nylanders Orkester
- 2010: Facienda (Jazzland), within Motif
- 2010: Shapes and Phases (Sofa), within Vertex
- 2010: Tsar Bomba, within Juxtaposed
- 2010: Marianne Halmrast Kvintett (Aim)
- 2010: Lucy (STWD), with Samuel Tramp
- 2011: Volt/Revolt (Gigafon), within Marvel Machine
- 2011: Treehouse
- 2012: Early Years (Parallell), within Peloton
- 2012: Scent of Soil (Hubro), with Tore Brunborg and Kirsti Huke
- 2013: Rendition of a Whisper (Gigafon), Petter O Hanna
- 2013: 7th Day Saviour (Aspén), Kari Harneshaug
- 2013: Babylove (Propeller), Ingrid
- 2014: All In (Impeller), The Fjords
