= The Real Thing (Norwegian band) =

Norwegian jazz band

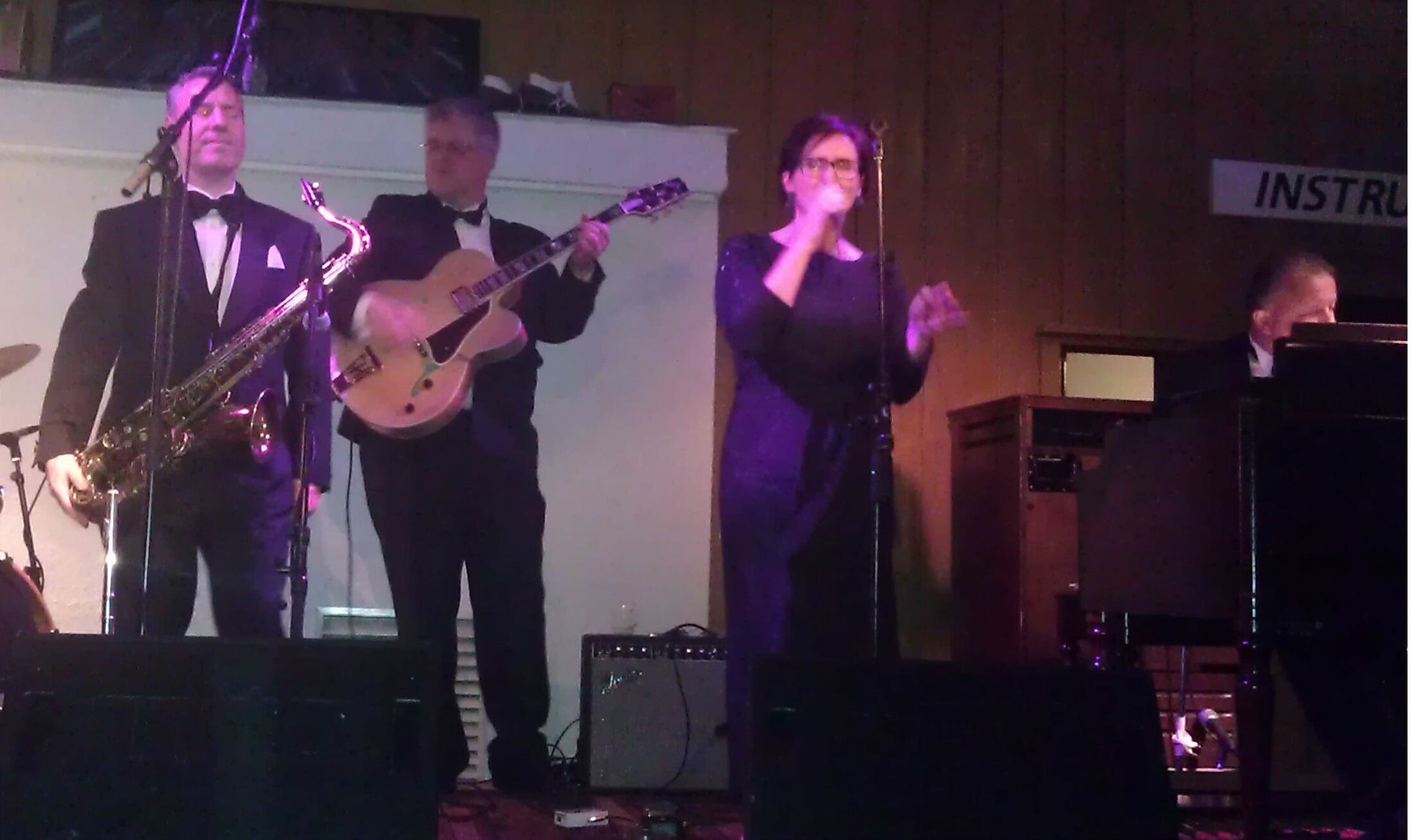
- Sigrid Brennhaug with The Real Thing, April 20, 2013.

Background information
- Origin: Oslo, Norway
- Genres: Jazz; Electronica; Experimental rock
- Years active: 1992–2005, 2010–
- Labels: Real Music Records
- Members: Paul Wagnberg; Staffan William-Olsson; Dave Edge; Hermund Nygård
- Past members: Sigurd Køhn; Fredrik Carl Størmer; Børre Dalhaug; Torstein Ellingsen
- Website: www.sigurdkohn.no

The Real Thing is a jazz band from Oslo, Norway, founded in 1992 when Sigurd Køhn and Palle (Paul) Wagnberg formed the forerunner, The B3 Blues Band with Vidar Busk and Hamlet Pedersen. They changed the name when Staffan William-Olsson and Fredrik Carl Størmer joined the band. Størmer was replaced by Torstein Ellingsen in 1995, and Ellingsen again by Børre Dalhaug in 1998. Due to the sudden death of the band's saxophonist Sigurd Køhn in the tsunami in Thailand in December 2004, The Real Thing was hibernating until a reunion in 2010. In the 2010s, Hermund Nygård replaced Dalhaug on the drums, with Dave Edge playing the saxophone.

Before their hiatus, the quartet released eight albums, debuting in 1992 with the album The Real Thing and continuing with both live and studio recordings. They mostly play original music, combining influences from American Blue Note jazz (represented by people such as Jimmy Smith, George Benson and Wes Montgomery) and elements from modern popular music. The result is a mixture of genres including swing, blues, soul, Latin, funk and rock.

In 2010, the band released the album Back on Track. In December 2017, they joined Angelina Jordan on her Christmas tour of Norway, along with singer Sigrid Brennhaug. In 2018, they released the album Oh No! Not… The Real Thing …Again!.

== Band members ==
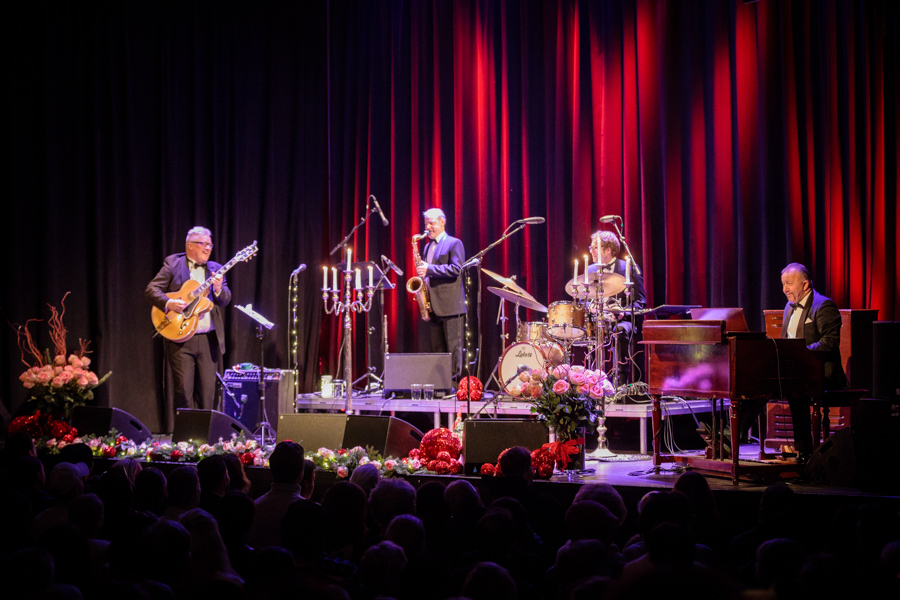
The Real Thing performing in 2017

- Paul Wagnberg – Hammond organ
- Staffan William-Olsson – guitar
- Dave Edge – alto saxophone
- Hermund Nygård – drums

== Discography ==
- 1992: The Real Thing (Real Records) featuring Køhn, Wagnberg, William-Olsson and Størmer.
- 1993: ...in New York (Real Records), feat. Lew Soloff produced by Georg «Jojje» Wadenius, and nominated for the Spellemannprisen 1994 with Køhn, Wagnberg, William-Olsson and Størmer.
- 1994: A Perfect Match (Real Records), with Bohuslän Big Band, arranged and produced by the Los Angeles-based arranger Tom Kubis with Køhn, Wagnberg, William-Olsson and Størmer.
- 1995: Live (Real Records)
- 1997: Pleasure is an Attitude (Real Records)
- 2000: Deluxe (Real Records), with Even Kruse Skatrud and the Norwegian Radio Orchestra
- 2003: New Wrapping (Real Records)
- 2006: A Real Christmas (Real Records), feat. Sigrid Brennhaug on vocal
- 2011: Back On Track (Real Records)
- 2018: Oh No! Not… The Real Thing …Again! (Real Records)
