= Andreas Amundsen =

Norwegian jazz bassist (born 1980)

- Born: 28 December 1980 (age 45); Senja, Troms, Norway
- Genres: Jazz
- Occupation: Musician
- Instrument: Upright bass

Andreas Amundsen (born 28 December 1980) is a Norwegian jazz bassist.

== Career ==
Amundsen was born on the island of Senja, Norway. He attended the Jazz program at Trondheim Musikkonservatorium (2004–06), but did not graduate. He is distinguished for a European style in his musical expression.

He has performed with "North" the quartet of Håvard Stubø, with Tore Johansen Quartet, in a quartet with Ed Thigpen, Espen Reinertsen's "Platoon", and at the Trondheim Jazz Festival, 2005, with John Pål Inderberg and Erling Aksdal.

In the summer of 2013, he played at the club "Herr Nilsen" together with Einar "Pastor'n" Iversen (piano), Staffan William-Olsson (guitar) and Andreas Bye (drums).

== Discography ==
- 2006: Slant of Light (Jazzaway Records), within "Eyewaterlillies»
- 2012: Det E'kke Bra Før Det Er Dårlig (Me Records), within "Meg og Kammeraten Min»
