= Nils-Olav Johansen =

Norwegian entertainer and jazz musician

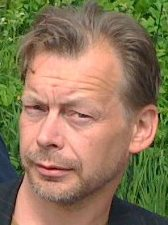
- Johansen in 2012.

Background information
- Born: 12 April 1966 (age 60); Bjugn Municipality, Sør-Trøndelag
- Origin: Norway
- Genres: Jazz
- Occupations: Musician, composer
- Instruments: Guitar, vocals
- Label: Jazzaway Records
- Website: Nils-Olav Johansen on Myspace

Nils-Olav Johansen (born 12 April 1966 in Bjugn Municipality, Norway) is a major Norwegian entertainer and jazz musician (guitar and vocals), known from several recordings and as orchestra leader. He is with Jarle Vespestad (drums) and Stian Carstensen (many instruments), central members of the Balkan-jazz orchestra Farmers Market.

Johansen is from Sør-Trøndelag, where he eventually moved to Heimdal. His father was a sailor, and he had an early contact with Hawaiian music. This influence, from the floating string sound, has followed him throughout his musical career.

== Career ==
He was a graduate of jazz studies at Trøndelag Conservatory of Music 1986–88. In Trondheim, he joined several groups that arose out of student life at NTNU, such as Close Enough (1987–88) and the Pentateuch (from 1989, later called Blix Band). Since 1992, he has been a regular member of three major orchestras: Farmers Market, Frode Fjellheims Jazz Joik Ensemble and "Storytellers", and has also had guest appearances with numerous other bands, such as "Veslefrekk", "Embla", Trondheim Jazz Orchestra and with Ståle Storløkken. Since 1991 he has contributed to dozens of recordings, with among others Farmers Market, Blix Band, "TINGeLING" (Tinkerbell), "Dingobats", Transjoik (here also as a composer and producer), "Køhn/Johansen Sextet", Trondheim Jazz Orchestra, "The Core".

He has led his own trio with Harald Johnsen (bass) and Sverre Gjørvad (percussion). Johansen has been a guest professor at the Royal Academy of Music in Aarhus, at the request of Django Bates. Recognized for his distinctive vocals and guitar playing, with elements from Finnish and Eastern European folk music.

Johansen has been, along with Stian Carstensen, one of the profiles in the band Farmers Market. It impresses him with virtuosity and humor. He made notable by its collaboration with Sigurd Køhn in Køhn/Johansen Sextet, a collaboration that ended in 2004, when the tsunami struck Thailand, where Køhn was on vacation. In 2005, he became a permanent member of the Anglo-Norwegian band Food.

In spring 2012, Johansen vent to India and the Jazz Utsav-festival with his own quartet put together for the occasion. It is a band consisting of the drummer Thomas Strønen, bassist Ole Morten Vågan and saxophonist Knut Riisnæs in addition to Johansen.

== Discography ==
=== Solo albums ===
- My Deal (2007, Jazzaway), with: Andreas Bye, Mats Eilertsen and Reidar Skår)

=== Collaborative works ===
With Køhn/Johansen Sextet

- Woman's Got to Have It (1999, Real), with Sigurd Køhn, Roy Powell, Harald Johnsen, Erlend Gjerde & Jarle Vespestad
- Angels (1999, Real), with Sigurd Køhn, Roy Powell, Harald Johnsen, Ole Johan Myklebust, Jørgen Munkeby and Jarle Vespestad + Even Skatrud Andersen, Hallgrim Berg, Heine Totland, Torbjørn A. Raae, and others)

With Farmers Market (Stian Carstensen, Trifon Trifonov, Finn Guttormsen & Jarle Vespestad)

- Speed/Balkan/Boogie (1995, Kirkelig Kulturverksted)
- Musikk fra Hybridene (Music From The Hybrides) (1997, Kirkelig Kulturverksted)
- 2000: Farmers Market (Winter & Winter)
- 2008: Surfin' USSR (Ipecac/Tuba)
- 2012: Slav to the Rhythm (Division)

With Frode Fjellheims Jazz Joik Ensemble

- 1994: Saajve dans

Under the name Transjoik

- 2004: Uja nami
- 2005: Bewafá

With Storytellers

- 1994: Enjoy Storytellers (Curling Legs)

With Blix Band

- 1989: Big Bambus (1989/2001)
- 1996: På en lyserød sky
- 1997: Pinseria (1997/2010)
- 1998: Texas

With Håvard Lund

- 1995: Letters

With Niels Præstholm & Embla Nordic Project in København

- 1997: Imagic

With Eldbjørg Raknes' TINGeLING

- 1997: TINGeLING
- 2002: So much depends upon a red wheel barrow, commissioned to Vossajazz (Platearbeiderne)
- 2006: I live suddenly (My Recordings)

With Jon Balke

- 1998: Saturation

With Solveig Slettahjell

- 2001: Slow motion orchestra

With Christina Bjordal

- 2003: Where dreams begin
- 2009: Warrior of light

Within Børre Dalhaug's "Bigbandblast"

- 2004: Bigbandblast! (Real Records)

With Eirik Hegdal

- 2004: Within Trondheim Jazz Orchestra

With The Core

- 2005: The Core

With Trondheim Jazz Orchestra

- 2008: Wood and water
- 2009: What if
