= Even Skatrud =

Norwegian musician, composer, and orchestra leader (born 1977)

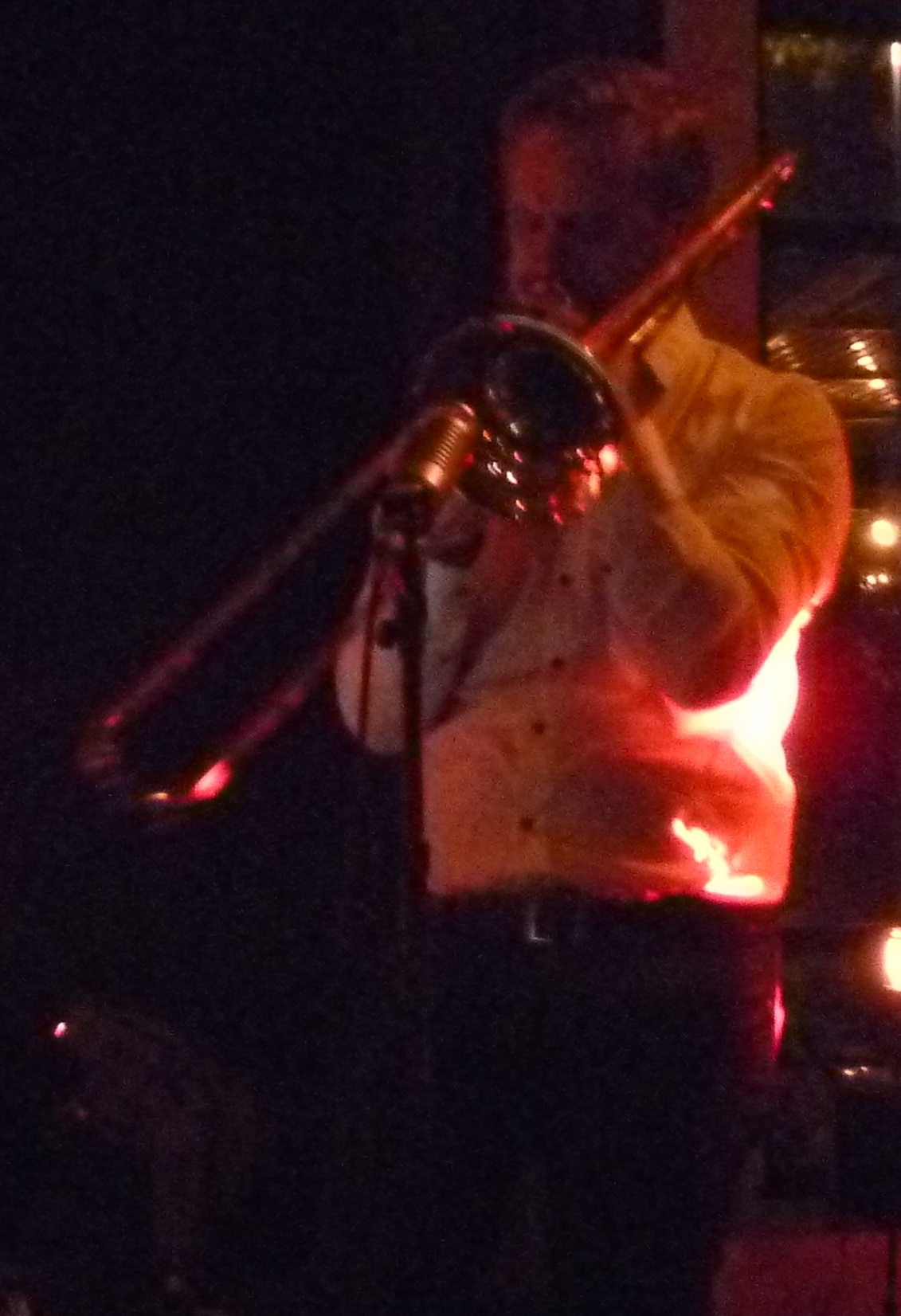
- Skatrud with Pitsj at Ingensteds September 10, 2016.

Background information
- Born: Even Skatrud Andersen; 18 August 1977 (age 48); Lørenskog, Akershus, Norway
- Genres: Jazz
- Occupations: Musician; music arranger; composer
- Instrument: Trombone
- Member of: Eveneven Big Band; Funky Butt

Even Skatrud (born 18 August 1977) is a Norwegian jazz musician, composer, arranger, Orchestra leader, and lecturer at the University of Oslo. He is the son of musician Harry Andersen and Marit Skatrud Andersen, married and divorced from singer-artist Anine Kruse Skatrud and son-in-law of the major Norwegian Contemporary composer Bjørn Kruse (b. 1946).

== Career ==
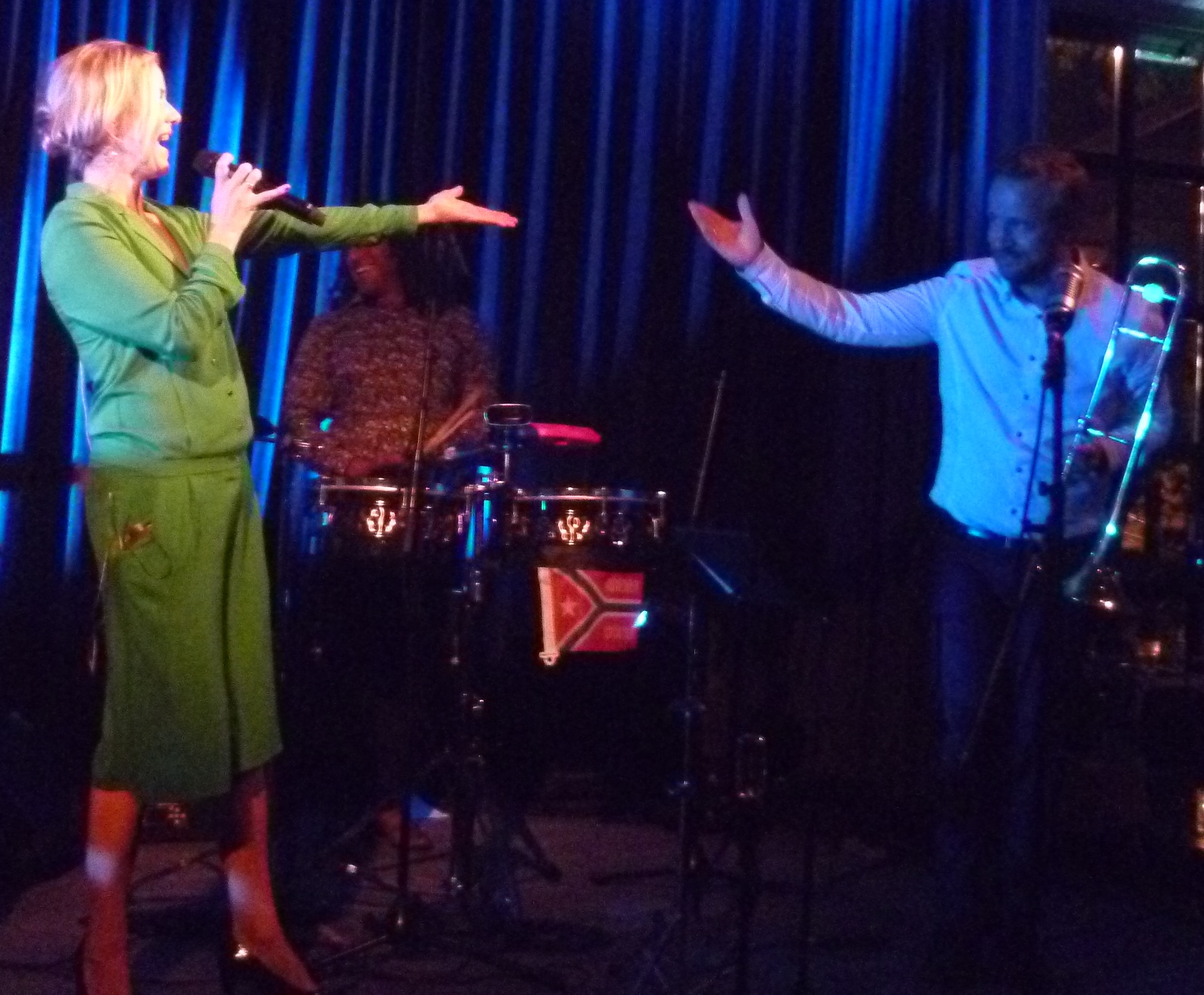
Skatrud with his sister in law Benedikte Kruse and Pitsj at Ingensteds September 10, 2016.

He studied music and composition at Norges Musikkhøgskole (from 1998) and contributed on a series of productions with orchestras like Funky Butt, Gumbo, Erik Smith's Friends, Soulslave, Descarga, Soul Inc, Ensemble Denada, Marinemusikken, Kringkastingsorkesteret, Kristiansand Symphony Orchestra and the originale "The Glenn Miller Orchestra". He has played with musicians like Phil Woods, Marilyn Mazur, Ray Anderson, Bobby Stewart, Eddie Daniels og Clarence Clemons, contributed to TV-shows like three Idol-orchestres (TV 2, 2003–05) and four seasons with Skal vi danse (TV 2), and solo performances with Oslo Philharmonic.

In 2003 he appeared on the album Angels with the Sigurd Køhn and Nils-Olav Johansen Sextet, and joined the brass section of the band Horndogs in 2005. Jens Petter Antonsen wanted to start up a brass section and got into contact with Kruse Skatrud and Børge-Are Halvorsen. From 2005 they have participated on several albums.

In 2006 he wrote an arrangement on Odd R. Antonsen Big Band Album – where Putte Wickman (1924–2006) on Clarinet and Grethe Kausland (1947–2007) on Vocals were among the soloists involved. This was the last recording of each of them on a record. This arrangement with Grethe Kausland was also played at her funeral – the title was: "Here's to life" – a celebration of life.

In 2008 he wrote 4 of the arrangements for Kjell Karlsen's Big Band Recording In Grieg Moods – Ved Rondane, Anitras dans, I Dovregubbens hall and a composition of Kjell Karlsen performed by Bjørn Johan Muri. In 2011 he played with Bergen Big Band.

Skatrud established the new Norwegian fusion band Moose Patrol together with guitarist Markus Lillehaug Johnsen. They have composed new original music for the DølaJazz, Lillehammer Jazzfestival 2016. There they gave the audience a real treat with the additional lineup Mathias Eick and Jens Petter Antonsen (trup ets), Atle Nymo (saxophone), Jørn Øien (keyboards), Audun Erlien (bass), Torstein Lofthus (drums), Martin Windstad (perkusjon).

== Events ==
- 2008 – Kruse Skatrud conducted his first military band, on tour with divisjonsmusikken in Harstad.
- 2008 – Skatrud started giving lectures at Blinderen on the discipline of arranging (UiO).
- 2010 – Gumbo made a 5-week tour in Asia – one week in Guanshow, one week in Shang-hai, three weeks in India.
- 2010 – Took over as conductor of the Romsås Janitsjar
- 2011 – Employed at the University of Oslo, Norway as assistant professor, where he teaches jazz arranging.

== Productions ==
=== Conductor ===
- Lørenskog Kavalkaden 2004
- Telenors Kulturprogram og Kulturpris 2008 – You can't stop the beat – + musicians from Montenegro
- Nordeas Kulturprogram 2009 – 2010 – Trine Rein – Quincy Jones Tribute

=== Musician ===
- Eveneven Big Band, Eveneven (Eveneven publishing, 2006)
- Whoopin 2001 – Funky Butt
- The Glove 2004 – Funky Butt
- Big Mama 2005 – Funky Butt
- Shakin da butt 2007
- Rock i fullt alvor – Imperceptible Shattering of Innocence 1993 – bass Guitar
- Mye rart på Romerike 1997 – trombonist in Romerike All-stars
- Lasse Thoresen – Som bølger på et hav – 2000 – trombonist
- The Real Thing – Deluxe 2000 – trombonist
- Dollie De luxe – Dollie's beste 2001 – trombonist
- Shire – Car 2001 – trombonist
- Motorpsycho – Phanerothyme 2001 – trombonist
- Asgeir – Sjefen over alle sjefer 2001 – trombonist
- Molo 2002 – Rockeband – trombonist
- Fabel – Smil 2002 – trombonist
- Trollhalen – Lisbeth Nygård 2003 – trombonist
- Amund Maarud 2003 – trombonist
- Trumpet Jungle 2003 – trombonist
- Number Seven Deli 2003 – trombonist
- Køhn/Johansen – Angels 2003 – Flugabone og trombone
- Børre Dalhaug's Bigbandblast! 2004 – trombonist
- Kor 90 & Funky Butt – Shout all over god's heaven 2004 – trombonist
- Margarets 2005 – trombonist
- Dodo Miranda – 2005 – trombonist, arranger
- Eveneven Big Band 2006
- Gumbo 2006
- Pitsj 2006

=== Arranger ===
- Norske Store Orkester – DENADA 2006
- Antonsen Big Band 2007 -"Here's to life" with Grethe Kausland
- Alejandro Fuentes – Tomorrow only knows 2007 – trombonist
- Jørn Hoel – På Grunn av Dæ 2007 – trombonist
- Marian Aas Hansen – It's beginning to look a lot like christmas 2007 – trombone row in the big band
- Kyss meg – Vilde Bjerke 2008 – trombonist
- Kjell Karlsens Storband – In Grieg Moods. 2008

=== Trombonist and arranger ===
- Gospelkoret HIM – Mighty in the spirit 2009 – trombonist
- Gospelkoret HIM – Juleplate 2010 – trombonist
- Helge Sunde's Ensemble Denada 2009 – Lead trombone – won the Echo-prize Deutscher Musikpreis Jazz 2010
- Maria Mohn 2009 – trombonist
- Ole Børud – Keep Movin'- 2011

=== DVD releases ===
- Idol 2003
- Idol 2004
- Idol 2005
- A Night of Gospel – 2008
