= Kåre Nymark =

Norwegian jazz trumpeter and composer

Kåre Nymark Jr.
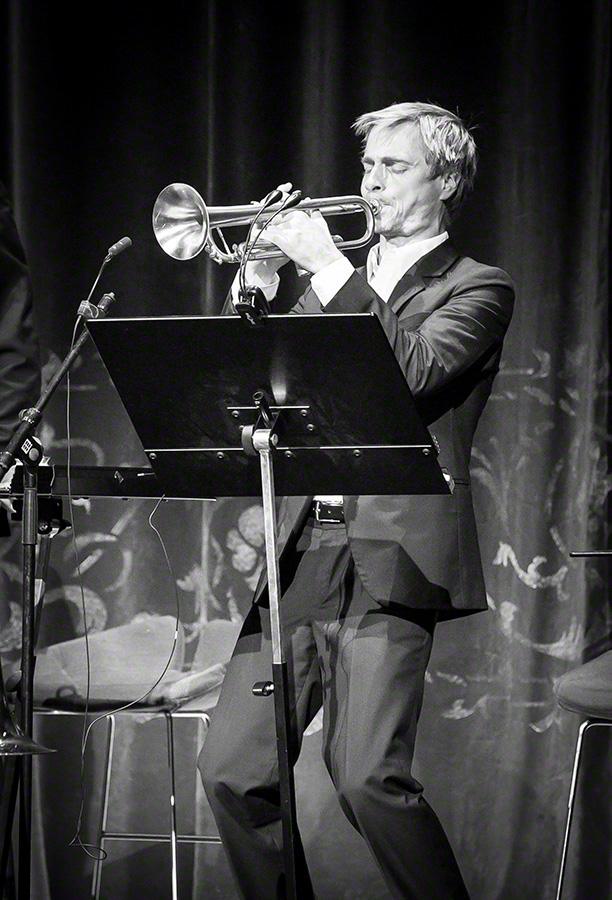
- Nymark with Kaba Orchestra at Oslo Jazzfestival 2016.

Background information
- Born: 22 July 1974 (age 51); Langevåg, Møre og Romsdal, Norway
- Genres: Jazz
- Occupations: Musician, composer
- Instrument: Trumpet
- Label: Nymark Collective Records Kirkelig Kulturverksted
- Website: www.nymark-jr.no

Kåre Nymark Jr. (born 22 July 1974 in Langevåg, Norway) is a Norwegian jazz trumpeter and composer, with experience in bands such as Nymark Collective, SKRUK, The Real Thing, Gumbo, Funky Butt, Jazzmob, and the Ytre Suløens Jass-ensemble (1992–2010), and with musicians such as Earle Hyman, Nils Petter Molvaer, Silje Nergaard, Tord Gustavsen, Kristin Asbjørnsen, Arve Henriksen, John Pål Inderberg, Henning Sommerro, Arne Domnerus and Morten Gunnar Larsen.

== Career ==
Nymark Jr. began playing the cornet in the school band Langevåg Skulekorps when nine years old. He was introduced to jazz by instructors from bands like the Ytre Suløens Jass-ensemble and The Brazz Brothers. As a result of this he started the brass band The Wagga Wagga Band in 1990, together with musical friends, and was involved in other local bands such as Fem Fargar and Big Band Blast. In 1992 he was requested to play with the Ytre Suløens Jass-ensemble, and this was the beginning of a life as professional musician and an 18-year membership of the band.

He was educated at Toneheim folkehøgskole (1993–94), with a major in jazz, and Norges Musikkhøgskole, where he studied with Torgrim Sollid, Jens Petter Antonsen, Arve Henriksen, Frank Brodahl and Eckard Baur. Within his own Nymark Collective he plays with Mats Eilertsen (bass), Kenneth Ekornes (drums) and Tord Gustavsen (piano). This Quartet has released the albums First Meeting (2000), Contemporary Tradition (2002), Dype Stille Sterke Milde (2006), and New Surroundings (2012). The last was commissioned by the Oslo jazz festival in 2001. He has also played with: the sextet Funky Butt, releasing the album The Glove (2003); the jazz band Gumbo; the Jazzmob; and has toured with the Rikskonsertene (with the children's show Gumbo).

The Kåre Nymark Jr. Band was established in 2009, with a debut concert at Ungjazz in Ålesund 2009, where he was awarded the 2009 Ungjazzprisen. The band's music is melodic and hard-swinging jazz, with references to hard bop, gospel, blues, African and Caribbean music, and New Orleans jazz. All songs are original compositions by Nymark Jr. The band comprises musicians from earlier collaborations: Atle Nymo (tenor saxophone), Kristoffer Kompen (trombone), Jørn Øien (piano), Jens Fossum (bass), and Andreas Bye (drums).

== Discography ==
=== As band leader ===
Solo albums

- 2012: New Surroundings (Schmell)

With Nymark Collective

- 2000: First Meeting (Sonor Records)
- 2002: Contemporary Tradition (Sonor Records)
- 2006: Dype Stille Sterke Milde (Kirkelig Kulturverksted), with SKRUK
- 2008: Bessie Smith Revisited Live in Concert (Nymark Collective Records), feat. Kristin Asbjørnsen

=== Collaborative works ===
Within Funky Butt

- 2003: The Glove (Sonor Records)

Within Børre Dalhaug's Bigbandblast

- 2004: Bigbandblast! (Real Records)

With Hilde Louise Asbjørnsen

- 2004: Eleven Nights And Two Early Mornings (Amigo)
- 2005: Birdie Blues (Upnorth Discs)

With Hanne Tveter

- 2008: My Letter to the World (Nordic Records), words by Emily Dickinson
