= Nora Brockstedt =

Norwegian singer

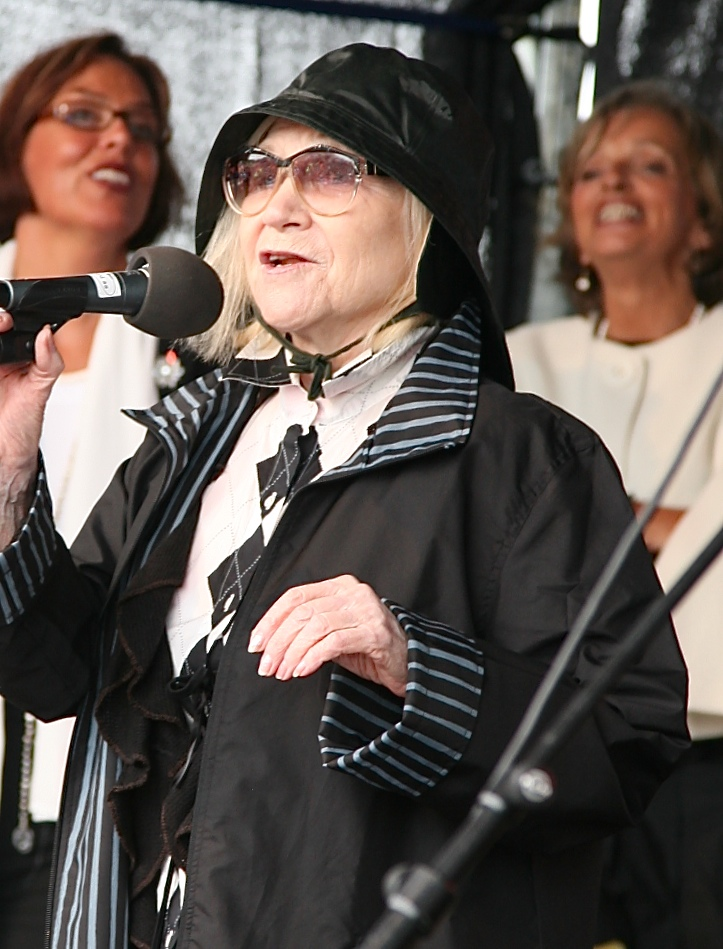
- Born: 20 January 1923; Oslo, Norway
- Died: 5 November 2015 (aged 92); Oslo, Norway
- Occupation: Singer

Nora Brockstedt (20 January 1923 – 5 November 2015) was a Norwegian singer. She was the first person ever to represent Norway in the Eurovision Song Contest, appearing as the Norwegian entrant in 1960 and 1961.

She was first nationally known through being part of the musical quintet The Monn Keys.

In her last years, she focused more on the jazz genre, with successful albums like As Time Goes By (JazzAvdelingen, 2004) and Christmas Songs (JazzAvdelingen, 2005). She sang jazz in the 1960s, but was more known for her conventional pop songs.

She died after a short illness at Ullevaal Hospital in Oslo on 5 November 2015.

== See also ==
- Eurovision Song Contest 1960
- Eurovision Song Contest 1961
- Melodi Grand Prix
- Jazz

Preceded by N/A	Norway in the Eurovision Song Contest; 1960 with "Voi Voi" and 1961 with "Sommer i Palma"	Succeeded by Inger Jacobsen with "Kom sol, kom regn"
