= Sigurd Køhn =

Norwegian jazz musician (1959–2004)

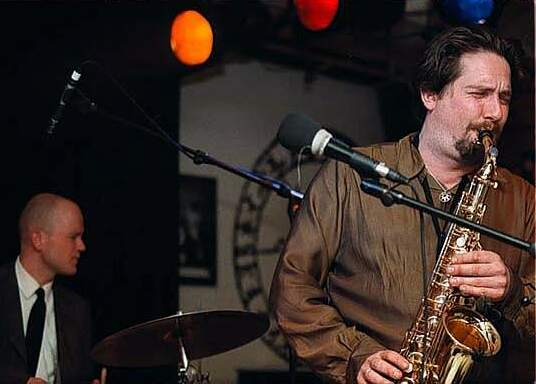
- Sigurd Køhn playing the alto sax

Background information
- Born: Sigurd Eystein Køhn; 6 August 1959; Kristiansand, Norway
- Died: 26 December 2004 (aged 45) Khao Lak, Thailand
- Genres: Jazz
- Occupations: Musician, composer, band leader
- Instrument: Saxophone
- Labels: Real Records
- Website: www.sigurdkohn.no

Sigurd Eystein Køhn (6 August 1959 – 26 December 2004) was a Norwegian jazz saxophonist and composer.

== Career ==
Køhn was born in Kristiansand, Norway, and started playing the violin and the clarinet at the age of 9, and begun playing the alto saxophone when he was 14.

He moved to Oslo when he was 19 years old, and became quickly a part of the city's jazz life. In the 1980s, he played the saxophone with different fusion and soul bands ("Lava", "Son of Sam", "The Heavy Gentlemen" and more), but he returned to the jazz in the 1990s. He played with the jazz quartet The Real Thing from 1992 until his death, in addition to his own "Sigurd Køhn Quartet" from 1994 and "Køhn/Johansen Sextet" from 1999. In 1996, Køhn's first record under his own name was released, More Pepper, Please. On the album, Køhn performed the music of Art Pepper, in cooperation with, among others, Dag Arnesen and Jarle Vespestad. The album was well received.

He performed with the band a-ha on their tours between 1991 and 1994, and he also recorded a jazz cover of their song "October".

He had just finished his last album, This Place, before the tsunami disaster, which was due to be released in January 2005 along with a release concert planned for January 17. Because of the tragic events, the release of his record was delayed, but the concert became a tribute concert to Køhn's music, where many of his friends participated. The record was released by his widow Heidi Køhn on 26 October 2005.

== Death ==
Sigurd Køhn and his 16-year-old son Simen drowned after being struck by the tsunami during their vacation in Khao Lak, Thailand, on 26 December 2004.

== Discography (in selection) ==
=== Solo albums ===
- 1996: More Pepper, Please (Real Records)
- 2005: This Place (Real Records), as S.K. Quartet

=== Collaborative works ===
Within The Real Thing

- 1992: The Real Thing (Real Records)
- 1992: In New York (Real Records)
- 1994: A Perfect Match (Real Records), with Bohuslän Big Band
- 1995: Live (Real Records)
- 1995: Pleasure Is An Attitude (Real Records)
- 2000: Deluxe (Real Records)
- 2003: New Wrapping (Real Records)

Within "Køhn/Johansen Sextet"

- 1999: Woman's Got To Have It (Real Records)
- 2003: Angels (Real Records)
