= Staffan William-Olsson =

Swedish jazz guitarist

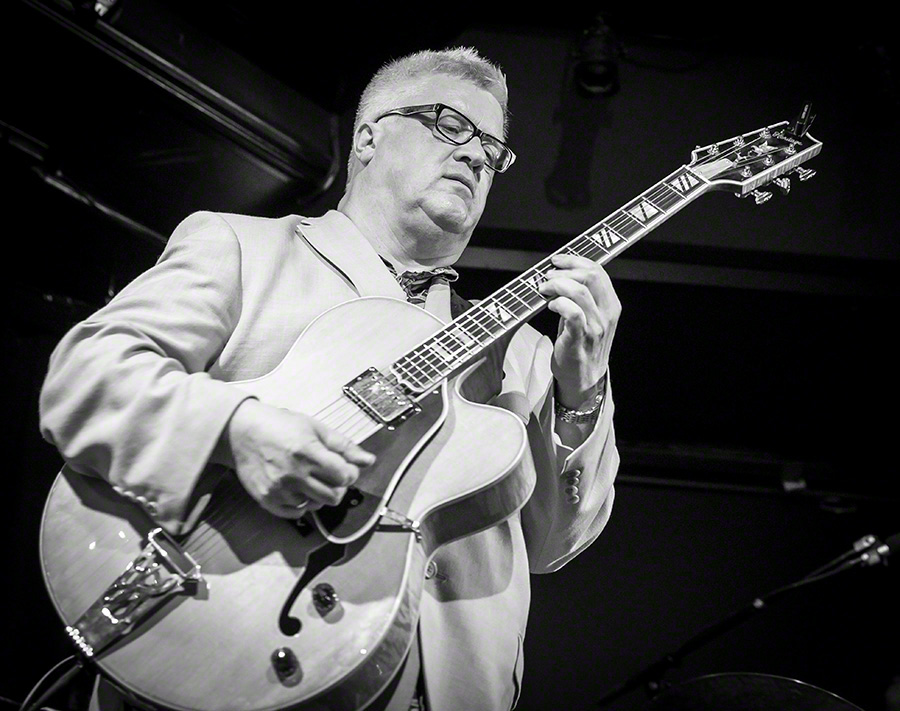
- William-Olsson at Oslo Jazzfestival 2016

Background information
- Born: 13 December 1959 (age 66); Gothenburg, Sweden
- Genres: Jazz
- Occupations: Musician, composer
- Instrument: Guitar
- Label: Real Music Records
- Formerly of: The Real Thing, Sharp 9

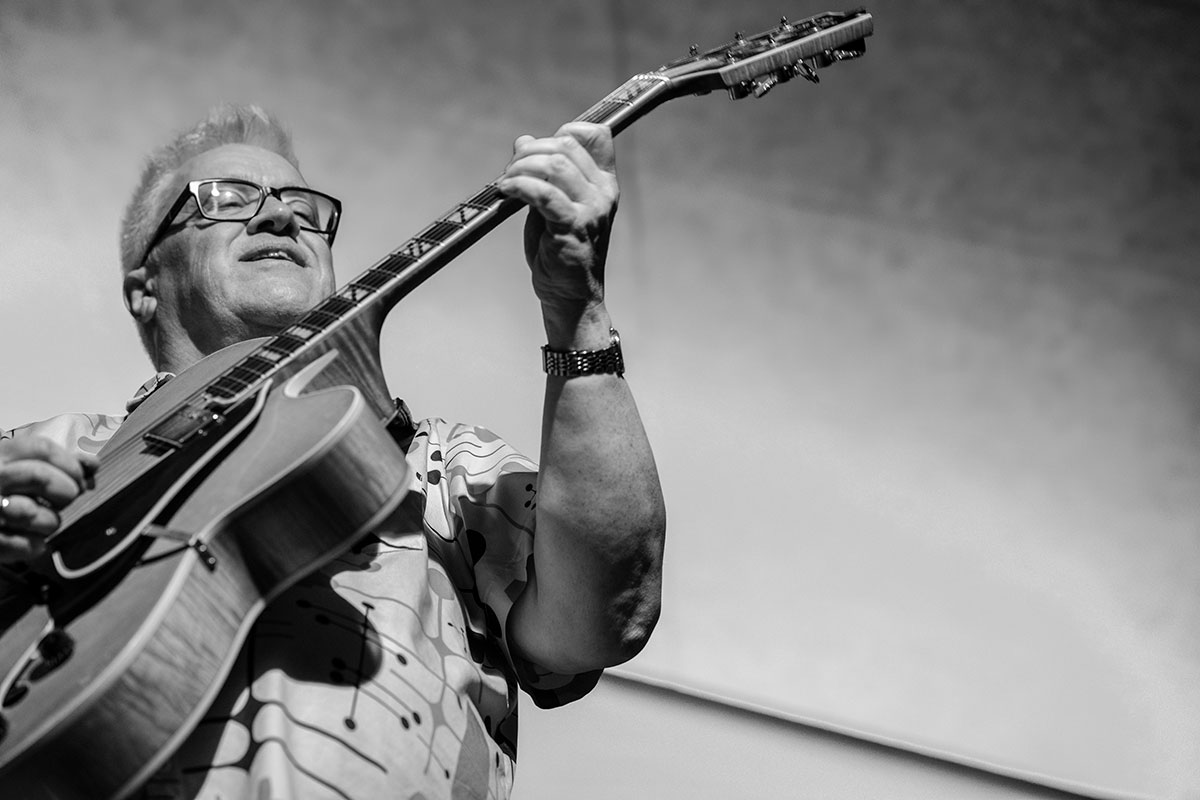
Denmark 2021 PHoto Hreinn Gudlaugsson

Staffan William-Olsson (born 13 December 1959) is a Swedish jazz guitarist in the band The Real Thing who has worked with Bob Berg, Lee Konitz, and Palle Mikkelborg.

== Career ==
He played piano, guitar and drums already at the age of 7, and studied classical piano with a jazz-oriented teacher. Eventually he was oriented towards the guitar, with the blues and rock music as main sources of influence (Jimi Hendrix, Deep Purple and Led Zeppelin as main models).

When he discovered jazz-rock, Weather Report, John McLaughlin and Allan Holdsworth among others became the new sources of inspiration. George Benson's record Bad Benson was a turning point, it opened up his ears for the clean, undistorted guitar sound, and guitarists like Pat Martino was a great influence.

William-Olsson was after classical piano studies at Göteborg Musikhögskola (he is autodidact guitarist), the replacement for Ulf Wakenius in the Swedish fusion band Hawk on Flight, and also collaborated with such as Bob Berg, Lee Konitz and Palle Mikkelborg.

He moved to Oslo in 1986 and worked as a freelance guitarist before becoming a part of the hard rock band Sons of Angels in 1989. The band signed a recording contract with Atlantic Records, and toured the east coast of US and Europe. The album sold 100,000 copies, and the band broke up.

The Real Thing was established in 1992. The solo albums Three Shades of Blue (1995) and Smile! (1998), was bouth nominated for the Spellemannprisen. Thereafter he has released two more albums, Oak Road Boogaloo (2000) and Pop! (2002). William-Olsson started the mini big band "Sharp 9" in 2005, inspired by the likes of Art Pepper and Miles Davis. Within "Sharp 9" he released NO:Network (2004) and Sudoku (2007).

== Discography ==
=== Solo ===
- 1995: Three Shades of Blue (Real Records)
- 1998: Smile! (Real Music Records)
- 2000: Oak Road Boogaloo (Real Music Records)
- 2002: Pop! (Real Music Records)

=== Collaborations ===
With The Real Thing

- 1992: The Real Thing (Real Music Records)
- 1993: ...in New York (Real Music Records), feat. Lew Soloff produced by Georg "Jojje" Wadenius, and nominated for the Spellemannprisen 1994
- 1994: A Perfect Match (Real Music Records), with Bohuslän Big Band, arranged and produced by the Los Angeles-based arranger Tom Kubis
- 1995: Live (Real Music Records)
- 1997: Pleasure is an Attitude (Real Music Records)
- 2000: Deluxe (Real Music Records), with Even Kruse Skatrud and the Norwegian Radio Orchestra
- 2003: New Wrapping (Real Music Records)
- 2006: A Real Christmas (Real Music Records), feat. Sigrid Brennhaug on vocal

With Terje Gewelt

- 2013: Steppingstone (Resonant Music), including with Adam Nussbaum

With Sharp 9

- 2004: NO:Network (Real Music Records)
- 2007: Sudoku (Real Music Records)

Awards
Preceded by Bodil Niska	Recipient of the Sildajazzprisen; 2006	Succeeded by Christina Bjordal
