= Bohuslän Big Band =

Swedish jazz ensemble

The Bohuslän Big Band is a modern jazz ensemble from Sweden which started as a military band in the 19th century. They play original music as well as compositions by Lars Jansson, Maria Schneider, Frank Zappa and others. For the 2026 Grammy Awards, they received a nomination for the album Lumen in the Best Large Jazz Ensemble Album category.

The Bohuslän Big Band cooperate with several important arrangers around the world, like Bob Mintzer and George Gruntz. They have been touring in China and Japan as well as in Europe.

The band has released nine CDs and one DVD. The DVD contains the original scores Gil Evans wrote for Miles Davis 1958. Soloist on this DVD is trumpeter Lew Soloff.

== Discography ==
- Westwinds (Fusion, 1992)
- Pegasos (Imogena, 1993)
- The Blue Pearl (Phono Suecia, 1996)
- One Poem, One Painting (Imogena, 1998)
- Bohuslan Big Band Plays Zappa (Imogena, 2000)
- Ramel Ramel Ramel (Gazell, 2000)
- Temenos (Spice of Life, 2003)
- Swallow Songs (Bohuslan Big Band, 2008)
- Good Time Christmas (Vara Konserthus, 2009)
- Don't Fence Me In (ACT, 2011)
- Pegasus (Prophone, 2013)
- Frankly! A Tribute to Frank Sinatra (Vara Konserthus, 2016)
- "Lumen Danilo Pérez & Bohuslän Big Band" (Prophone Records 2024)
