= Vera Micaelsen =

Norwegian journalist (1974–2018)

Vera Michaelsen
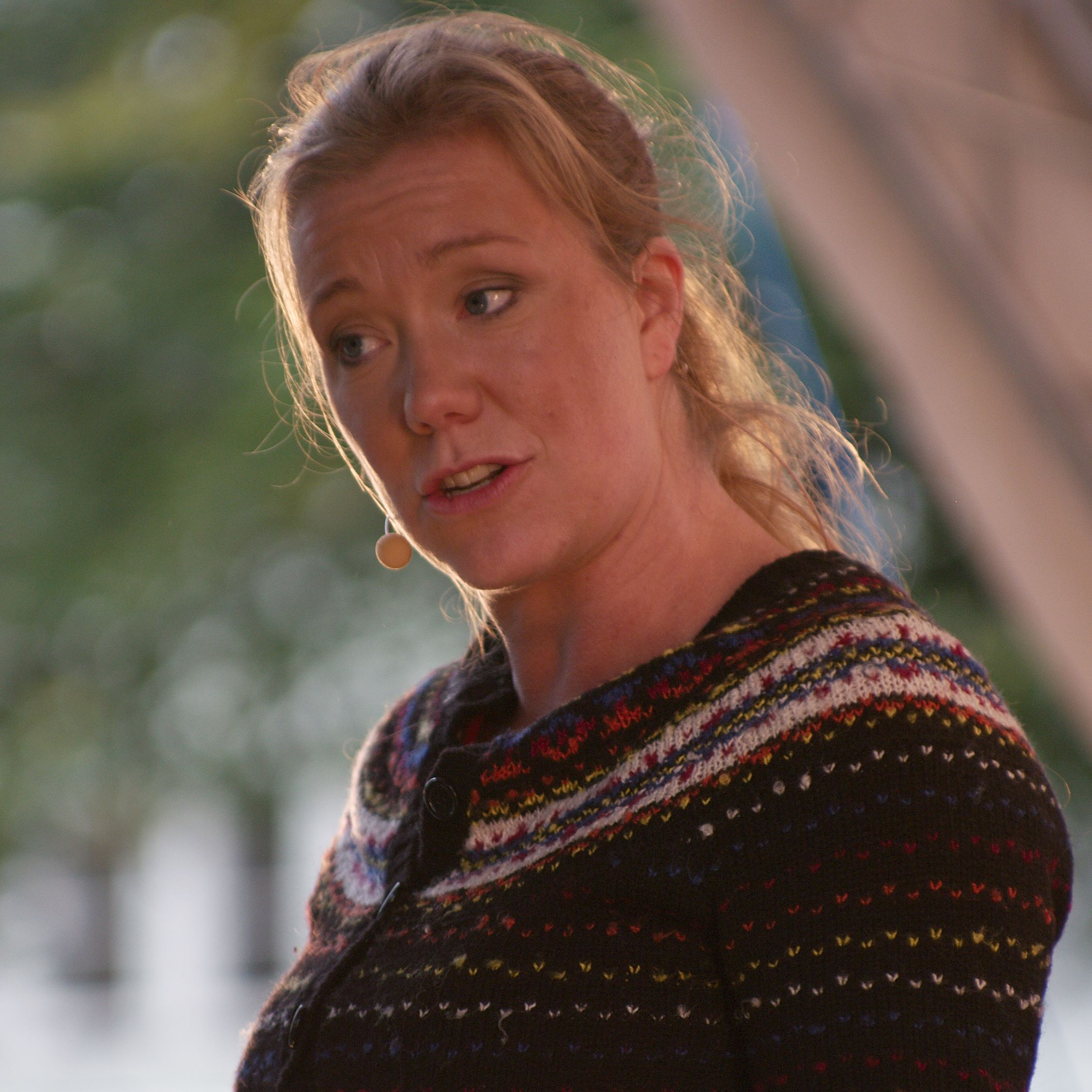
- Micaelsen in 2011.
- Born: 4 December 1974; Oslo, Norway
- Died: 28 October 2018 (aged 43); Oslo, Norway
- Occupations: Television journalist, author
- Spouse: Atle Knudsen
- Children: 3

Vera Micaelsen (4 December 1974 – 28 October 2018) was a Norwegian television journalist and author.

== Career ==
Micaelsen worked twelve years in NRK. There, she was the presenter for shows such as Jubalong, Holger Nielsens Metode, VeraVera, Rugekassa and Go' elg. She also worked with Friday and Saturday entertainment, documentaries and other children and youth programs in radio and television. She was also a columnist for Aftenposten Junior.

Micaelsen wrote several books for and about children. She debuted as a youth book writer with the book Hyperpubertet at Aschehoug publisher in 2013. She was employed as a long film consultant at Norsk Filmfond. She was employed as a senior advisor in the Den kulturelle skolesekken.

== Personal life and death ==
Micaelsen was married to director and screenwriter Atle Knudsen with whom she had three daughters. She was also the sister-in-law of footballers Jon and Mari Knudsen.

In February 2014, Micaelsen was diagnosed with cervical cancer with proliferation. She received radiation therapy which apparently was successful, but the cancer came back in the fall of 2017 and Micaelsen died on 28 October 2018.

== Bibliography ==
- 2003: 1000 ting å gjøre sammen med barna
- 2005: På månen spiser de kameler - filosofi for barn
- 2008: Supermamma monstermamma - historier om familiekaos og småbarnsliv
- 2009: Kua som falt ned fra himmelen - forunderlige fortellinger fra virkeligheten
- 2011: Å klemme fingeren i døra - en bok om følelser
- 2013: Hyperpubertet
- 2014: Discosatan
