= Lena Kristin Ellingsen =

Norwegian actress (born 1980)

- Born: Lena Kristin Ellingsen; 14 September 1980 (age 44); Saltdal Municipality, Norway
- Occupation: Actress
- Spouse: Trond Fausa Aurvåg

Lena Kristin Ellingsen (born 14 September 1980) is an actress from Saltdal Municipality, Norway. She is best known for her role as Karoline in the Norwegian TV series Himmelblå.

== Early life and career ==
Ellingsen graduated from the and Bårdar Akademiet in 2001 and the Norwegian National Academy of Theatre in 2004. She has worked in Riksteatret, Oslo Nye Teater, Det Norske Teatret and Teatret Vårt in Molde.

Between 2008 and 2010, Ellingsen starred as Karoline in Himmelblå, a Norwegian drama series which aired on NRK1 in Norway, on SVT in Sweden and RÚV in Iceland.

In the fifteenth episode of Himmelblå, Ellingsen sings the opening theme for the TV series as Karoline in the town's pavilion alongside Halvdan Sivertsen. The theme song is originally performed by Anne Marie Almedal, written by Almedal and Nicholas Sillitoe.

Ellingsen won the Gullruten for Best Actress for her portrayal of Karoline in Himmelblå in 2009.

In 2011 she played the role of Trine in the Norwegian black comedy film Jackpot.

== Filmography ==
=== Film ===
Film and Television appearances correct as of August 2024

Year	Title	Role	Notes
2007	5 Lies	Sygepleier	Norwegian: 5 løgner
2011	Jackpot	Trine	
2014	Glass Dolls	Kine Berger	
2016	Twinkle Twinkle Little Star	Janet	Short
2018	22 July	Signe Lippestad	
2020	Regular White	Mother	Short
2021	Frisørsalongen på Frydenlund	Molla Lorentzen	Short
2024	Clowns	Binky	Short

=== Television ===
Year	Title	Role	Notes
2008-2010	Himmelblå	Karoline	23 episodes, Gullruten award for Best Actress
2011	Norwegian Cozy	Hege	4 episodes, TV mini series
2014	Mammon	Vibeke Haglund	5 episodes
2014-2015	Struggle for Life	Anitra Skolmen	10 episodes
2011-2015	Dag	Dorina	12 episodes
2019	En får væra som en er	Stella	1 episode
2020	Norsemen	Masseuse	6 episodes, Norwegian: Vikingane
2021	Kristiania magiske tivolitheater	Erle Butenschøn	24 episodes
2021-2022	Olympiatroppen	Eva Nordberg	8 episodes
2023	R.I.P Henry	Elisabeth Johnsen	8 episodes

== Personal life ==
Ellingsen lives in Oslo with her husband, actor Trond Fausa Aurvåg.
