= Giørtz =

Giørtz is a surname. Notable people with the surname include:

- Anne-Marie Giørtz (born 1958), Norwegian vocalist, orchestra conductor, and singing teacher, sister of Ole
- Ole Henrik Giørtz (born 1955), Norwegian jazz pianist, arranger, and bandleader
