= Carl Magnus Neumann =

Norwegian saxophonist (born 1944)

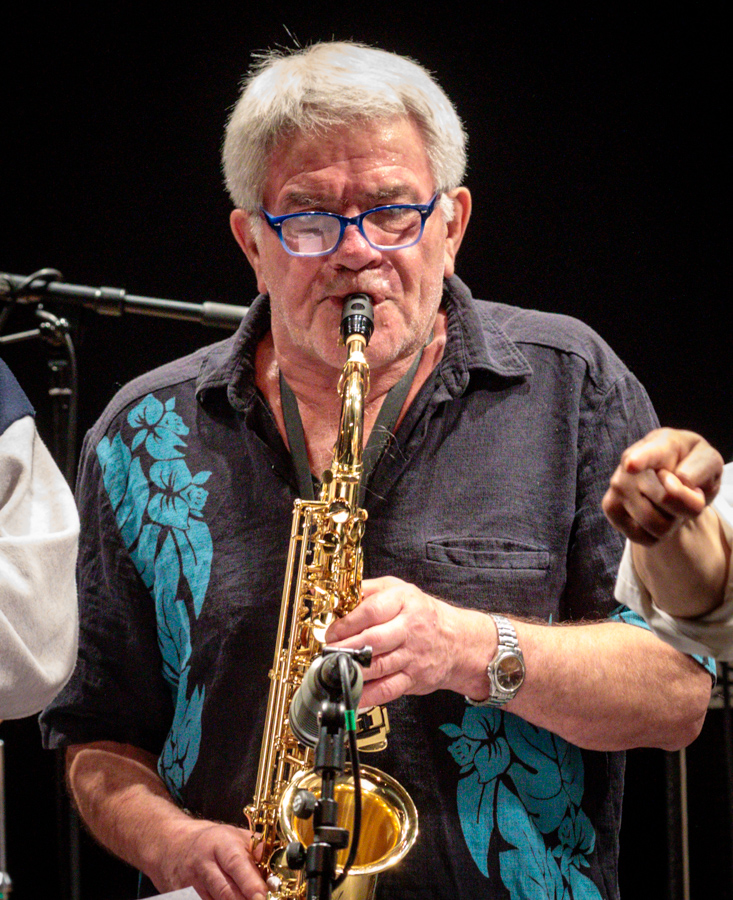
- Calle in 2017

Background information
- Also known as: Calle
- Born: 31 July 1944 (age 82); Oslo, Norway
- Origin: Norway
- Occupation: Musician
- Instrument: Alto saxophone
- Years active: 1958–present
- Label: Gemini

Carl Magnus Neumann, also known as Calle (born 31 July 1944), is a noted saxophonist, considered one of the best in Norway.

== Biography ==
Neumann was born in Oslo, and started playing the flute at an early age, before picking up the clarinet, playing with different swing bands in the late 1950s. After taking hire as sailor for a few years, he returned to Oslo buying his first saxophone in 1963. Neumann received the audience award with the Quartet of Oddvar Paulsen at the Norwegian Championship in amateur jazz the same year, and from then on he became professional musician. He played rhythm & blues with Arild Wikstrom and Public Enemies in the mid-1960s (releasing a single album with Karin Krog / Public Enemies Sunny / We're gonna move to the outskirts of town in 1966) and was ranked No. 1 Alto saxophonist in the Norwegian magazin Jazznytt's favorite poll in 1967.

Neumann was early well recognized in the octet of Fred Nøddelund that contributed to the concert series at the Munch Museum arranged by Norsk jazzforum in 1968, and later as the leader of his own "Newman and the New Men". He played in bands led by Arild Wikstrøm and Roy Hellvin. He played in dance bands "Bent Sølves and Terje Fjærns orkester", and had festival gigs with Roy Hellvin, Karin Krog and Terje Bjørklund, in addition to releasing the album Bleak House with Terje Rypdal in 1968. He became a mighty popular soloist receiving the Buddyprisen in 1971, and released the album Multimal with Svein Finnerud Trio in 1972. Neumann led several bands at the Kongsberg Jazzfestival, including with Dizzy Gillespie. He was a key player on Club 7, and was dedicated the album Carl Magnus Rides Again (1999) by Ditlef Eckhoff. As soloist with Christian Reim Quartet he released Live at Moldejazz in 1976.

Neumann played in the bands of Espen Rud, like "Kråbøl", and toured with the traditional Norwegian folk musicians Nils Økland and Bjørnar Andresen in 1985. After 13 years of musical silence, he became the lead figure of "The Quintet", with the debut of the jazz club "Blå" in 1998, followed by festival engagements at Vossajazz and Moldejazz in 1999 and in Oslo 2000. The concert at Voss 1999 immortalized on cd, and he received Oslo City Art Award in 2000. From 2000, he has lived a quieter life in Risør Municipality, but has collaborated on the albums Lost Animals (2009) with Vidar Johansen Quartet and To someone I knew (2013) by Erik Wesseltoft.

== Honors ==
- 1971: Buddyprisen
- 1981: Commission for Kongsberg Jazz Festival
- 2000: Oslo City Art Award

== Discography ==
=== Solo albums ===
- 1976: Live at Molde Jazzfestival 1976 (Moldejazz, rereleased in 2004 at Jazzaway Records), with Christian Reim Quartet
- 2006: Live at Kongsberg and Other Unreleased Works (Plastic Strip)

=== Collaborations ===
With Terje Rypdal

- 1968: Bleak House (Polydor Records)

With Svein Finnerud Trio

- 1972: Multimal (Polydor Records)

With The Quintet (including Bjørnar Andresen, Eivind Opsvik, Paal Nilssen-Love, and Ketil Gutvik

- 1999: 28 March 1999 (Blå Productions)

With Vidar Johansen Quartet

- 2009: Lost Animals (Jazzland Recordings)

With Erik Wesseltoft

- 2013: To Someone I knew (Normann Records)

Awards
Preceded by Frode Thingnæs	Recipient of the Buddyprisen; 1978	Succeeded by Asmund Bjørken
