= Ketil Gutvik =

Norwegian jazz guitarist

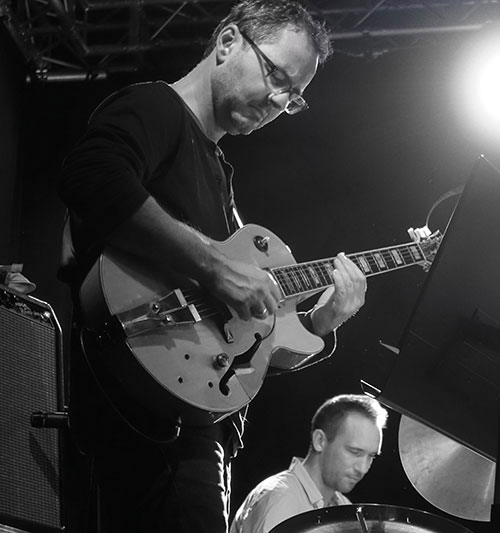
- Ketil Gutvik playing with Paal Nilssen-Loves band Large Unit in Aarhus, Denmark 2015

Background information
- Born: 4 July 1972 (age 54); Ålesund, Sunnmøre
- Origin: Norway
- Genres: Jazz
- Occupations: Musician and composer
- Instrument: Guitar
- Website: Official website

Ketil Gutvik (born 4 July 1972) is a Norwegian jazz musician (guitar) known on the Oslo's jazz scene since 1992.

== Career ==
Gutvik was born in Ålesund, and is a graduate of "The Trondheim Kommunale Musikkskole" (1987–92) and the Norwegian Academy of Music where he also teaches guitar. He is a versatile musician who has manifested himself both in mainstream contexts and free constellations within "The Quintet" including Paal Nilssen-Love (drums), Eivind Opsvik, Bjørnar Andresen (bass) and Carl Magnus Neumann (saxophone) released The Quintet (1998). He has also led his own bands such as "Presence" and "Walkie Talkie", and participated in the band "Presence" together with Vidar Johansen, as well as in "Marvin Charles Trio" where he, together with Mats Eilertsen (bass) and Marvin Charles (vocals), released songs by Nat King Cole on the album The Marvin Charles Trio (1998). He led the trio "Plushtree" (1996–) including Paal Nilssen-Love (drums) and Eivind Opsvik (bass).

In 2000 he established Jazid Jazzklubb where he was responsible for the live series "Drazztic Acoustic". The band "Walkie Talkie" was initiated in 2000 including Frode Nymo (saxophone), Per Oddvar Johansen (drums) and Per Zanussi (bass). He also played duets with Kjetil Møster for some time, and had a quartet with Paolo Vinaccia, Christian Wallumrød and Håkon Kornstad. In his Gutvik F E M (born 2003) he collaborates with Atle Nymo, Håkon Kornstad, Klaus Ellerhusen Holm, Ole Morten Vågan and Andreas Bye. Gutvik also play his free jazz in a quartet with Niklas Korssell (drums), Johan Berthling (bass) and Møster (saxophone).

Gutvik has Jim Hall, Jimi Hendrix, Derek Bailey and John Abercrombie as important role models in his free jazz. He established the summer concerts "Gutvik Ukentlig" (2003–), and was recently hired as a producer for contemporary music agency "Ny Musikk" (2007).

== Discography ==
Within 'Quintet' including Carl Magnus Neumann, Bjørnar Andresen, Eivind Opsvik & Paal Nilssen-Love

- 1999: 28 March 1999 (Blå Productions)

Within Marvin Charles Trio including Eivind Opsvik

- 2006: Marvin Charles Trio (Hot Club Records)
