= Olaf Kamfjord =

Norwegian jazz musician and composer (born 1962)

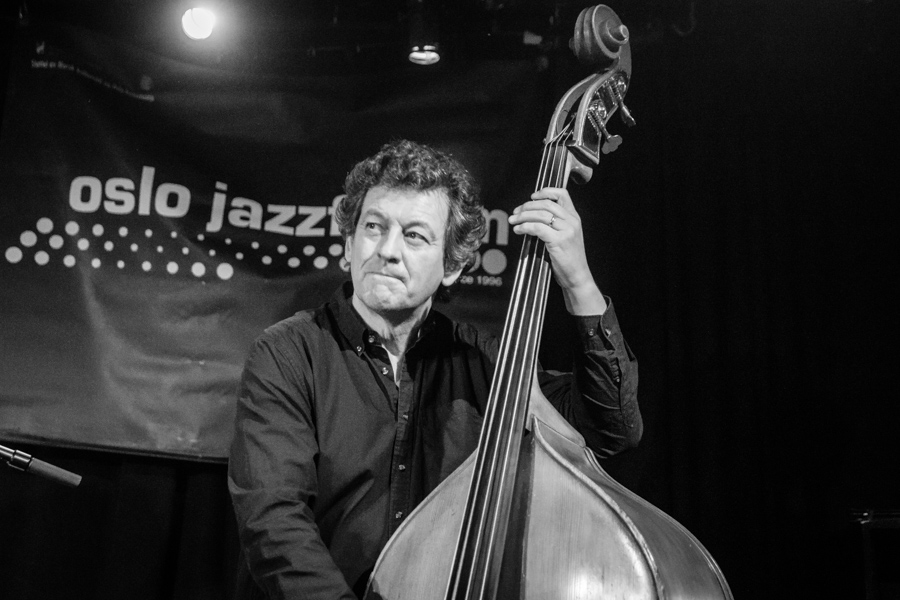
- Kamfjord performing in 2020

Background information
- Born: December 8, 1962 (age 63); Tønsberg, Vestfold
- Origin: Norway
- Genres: Jazz
- Occupations: Musician and composer
- Instruments: Double bass, bass guitar

Olaf Kamfjord (born December 8, 1962, in Tønsberg, Norway) is a Norwegian jazz musician (double bass and guitar bass) and composer, known from co-operations within bands like "Ab und Zu", "Herrene i haven", "Out To Lunch" and "Roy Nikolaisen Quartet".

== Career ==
Kamfjord was only 15 years of age when he started to play in a local trio in Tønsberg, led by guitarist Lars Martin Myhre, that later included singer Kari Astrup (Myhre/Astrup kvartett 1980–85). He participated in the "Amatørstorbandet" at Kongsberg Jazz Festival in 1981 and sat in with bands from Oslo the year after.

Kamfjord joined the Anne Marie Giørtz Quintet (1982–87), with several festival gigs and album releases, "Breaking out" (1983) and "Tigers of pain" (1985). He continued in the band "Ab und Zu" from 1987 (album recording in 1988–2002), and played at the same time in several other bands like the "Slagen Storband" (album releases in 1983–85), Christian Reim Quartet (1984–86), the band "Out to Lunch" from 1984 (albums "Out to lunch" 1988 and "Kullboksrytter" 1994), "Bossa Quatro" and Remek Kossacz Trio (1985–86), Guttorm Guttormsen Quintet (1985–87), Rune Klakegg Trio from 1986 (album release "Fuzzy logic" in 1995), og Vigleik Storaas Quartet 1987–92, later named "Lines" after their first album in 1988.

Kamfjord was awarded the "Urijazz" in Tønsberg 1987, has been engaged as jamkomp at Jazz festivals both in Kongsberg and Molde, has participated in Susanne Fuhr's Billie Holiday Performance 1990–91, and has since 1992 been a member of the local groups "D.E.E. Quartet" (Dag Einar Eilertsen) and "Kjernefamilien", besides collaboration with Odd Børretzen and Lars Martin Myhre, including the album "Noen ganger er det all right" (1995), and at Moldejazz in 1996. The album "Hush" with Lars Martin Myhre originates from 1998 to 1999, and later he attended Kjersti Stubø album "My shining hour", released in 2001, and Roy Nikolaisen ("Roy's choice", 2003).

== Discography (in selection) ==
- 1985: Bak Speilet (Hot Club Records), with Lars Martin Myhre & "Slagen Storband»
- 1988: Out to lunch, within "Out to lunch»
- 1988: Lines, within Vigleik Storaas Quartet
- 1989: Ab und Zu (EMI), within "Ab und Zu»
- 1992: Anaerobics (Odin), within Rune Klakegg Trio
- 1994: Kullboksrytter, within "Out to lunch»
- 1995: Fuzzy logic, within Rune Klakegg Trio
- 1996: Fuzzy Logic (Curling Legs) Rune Klakegg & Jon Rosslund
- 1996: Helt Halvdan (Nordaførr), with Halvdan Sivertsen
- 1989: Totally (Curling Legs), within "Ab und Zu»
- 1999: Hush, with Lars Martin Myhre
- 2001: My shining hour, within Kjersti Stubø Band
- 2002: Spark of Life (Curling Legs), within "Ab und Zu»
- 2006: Stengetid? (Tylden & Co), with Lars Martin Myhre
- 2011: My Sound (POL selection), with Cecilie Authen
- 2012: Romantic Notions (Curling Legs), within Rune Klakegg Trio
