= Ine Jansen =

Norwegian actress (born 1973)

- Born: 6 July 1973 (age 53)
- Education: Norwegian Theatre Academy
- Occupation: Actress
- Spouse: Erik Ulfsby (divorced)
- Partner: Atle Knudsen
- Parent: Per Jansen
- Awards: Gullruten; Komiprisen

Ine Finholt Jansen (July 6, 1973) is a Norwegian actress. She has won one Gullruten and two Komiprisen awards for her television work.

== Early life ==
Ine Jansen is the daughter of actor Per Jansen and prompter Evy Finholt. She spent part of her childhood in Tromsø, where her father worked at Hålogaland Teater, before moving back to Oslo. As a child, she often visited her parents while they worked in Fjernsynsteatret, and her own goal of becoming an actress gradually took shape.

== Career ==
She graduated from the Norwegian Theatre Academy in 1999. She was mainly a stage actress, working at Nationaltheatret, with various TV roles including the series Dag. In 2011 she was cast for the new series Helt perfekt, a Norwegian knockoff of Klovn where she would play the wife of Thomas Giertsen. Ine Jansen immediately won a Gullruten award in 2012 for best actress. She became a celebrity in a way that never had happened through stage work, and many confused her for Giertsen's real-life wife, leading bystanders to accuse Giertsen of adultery when he went out with his real wife. She later won the Komiprisen twice, in 2015 and 2016, both for Helt perfekt.

She also has film credits including Norske byggeklosser and TV credits including Kjære landsmenn, where she played the Queen of Norway.

== Personal life ==
She had twins in the early 2000s. She was married to Erik Ulfsby, but the couple later divorced. In 2022, she entered a relationship with Atle Knudsen.

Awards
Preceded by Tuva Novotny	Gullruten for Best Actress; 2012	Succeeded by Ine Marie Wilmann
