= Mammon (TV series) =

Norwegian detective television series

- Genre: Detective; thriller; crime; drama
- Created by: Vegard Stenberg Eriksen; Gjermund Eriksen
- Starring: Jon Øigarden (seasons 1–2)
- Composer: Martin Horntveth
- Country of origin: Norway
- Original languages: Norwegian; English
- No. of seasons: 2
- No. of episodes: 14

Production
- Production locations: Oslo, Norway
- Cinematography: Jon Anton Brekne
- Editor: Carl-Jørgen Ringvold
- Running time: 58 minutes
- Production company: NRK Drama

Original release
- Network: NRK
- Release: 1 January 2014 – present

Mammon is a Norwegian detective television series that was broadcast on NRK1 in 2014 and 2016. The producers of the series are Vegard Stenberg Eriksen and his brother Gjermund.

It was directed by Cecilie Mosli. The lead role is played by Jon Øigarden; other key roles are played by Lena Kristin Ellingsen, Nils Ole Oftebro, Ingjerd Egeberg, Anna Bache-Wiig, Alexander Rosseland, Andrine Sæther and Terje Strømdahl.

== Cast ==
=== Main ===
- Jon Øigarden as Peter Verås
- Nils Ole Oftebro as Frank Mathiesen
- Ingjerd Egeberg as Eva Verås
- Terje Strømdahl as Tore Verås
- Alexander Tunby Rosseland as Andreas Verås
- Anna Bache-Wiig sa Inger Marie Steffensen
- Dennis Storhøi as Tom Lied
- Andrea Bræin Hovig as Yvonne Haugen
- Halvard Holmen as Åge Haugen

=== Recurring ===
- Trond Espen Seim as Prime Minister Michael Woll
- Ingar Helge Gimle as Minister of Finance, Erik Ulrichsen
- Bjarte Hjelmeland as Minister of Education, Christian Schjelderup
- Laura Christensen as Ellen Claussen
- Pål Christian Eggen as Thorgrim Hammern
- Anders Danielsen Lie as Johannes "Johs" Ritter Hansen
- Laila Goody as Gunn Høgh
- Jan Gunnar Røise as Aslak Heimdahl
- Ine Jansen as Stine Gisken
- Michael McElhatton as Melanie Holly
- Erland Bakker as Lars Fritzmann
- Iben Akerlie as Amelia Woll

== Series overview ==
Series	Episodes	Originally released	
Series	Episodes	First released	Last released
1	6	1 January 2014	3 February 2014
2	8	3 January 2016	14 February 2016

== Episodes ==
=== Season 1 (2014) ===
No. overall	No. in season	Title	Directed by	Written by	Original release date
1	1	"Kapittel 1: Offeret" "Chapter 1: The Sacrifice"	Cecilie Mosli	Gjermund Eriksen	1 January 2014
Journalist Peter Verås (Jon Øigarden) receives a tip from an anonymous source about a scandal within the Norwegian financial world. The disturbing and crushing evidence incriminates his brother, a senior director within one of Norway's leading financial companies. Despite these factors, Peter decides to let the newspaper publish this story. The news about it has a line of consequences for his brother. Vibeke Haglund (Lena Kristin Ellingsen), an investigator of financial crimes, reveals some disturbing information for Peter, and the hunt begins.
2	2	"Kapittel 2: Oppvåkningen" "Chapter 2: The Awakening"	Cecilie Mosli	Gjermund Eriksen	6 January 2014
Peter finds out after five years of investigating, that his brother, Daniel (Anders T. Anderson) was pushed to commit suicide. He and his sister-in-law Eva (Ingjerd Egeberg), circle to the top of a financier, who knew about Daniel's secret. He discloses the word "Abraham" before he commits suicide. Despite that, Peter continues his search for the truth, while having the thought of keeping his family out of trouble. The police later disbelieve the statements that Peter made about what happened to his brother, Daniel. It does not matter for Peter how close he gets, but he knows the truth will still be concealed.
3	3	"Kapittel 3: Nedstigningen" "Chapter 3: The Descent"	Cecilie Mosli	Gjermund Eriksen	13 January 2014
After some investigating, Peter finds a connection between his brother's suicide and Aage Haugen's suicide: they both were in possession of paintings that make references to the child offering according to the Bible, they were both afraid that something awful was going to happen to their own children, and they both committed suicide on the same date, October 22nd. Peter's theory goes onto saying that someone pushed them to commit suicide, and that the paintings is a sign of a cry for help. At the same time Aftenposten and Peter try to figure out how financer Tom Lied (Dennis Storhøi) became one of Norway's wealthiest men.
4	4	"Kapittel 4: Pakten" "Chapter 4: The Pact"	Cecilie Mosli	Gjermund Eriksen	20 January 2014
Peter starts realizing that his brother was involved in more than just suicide, something considered even more brutal. Later someone is trying to get a message to Peter about what happened. Peter thinks that there are more people who are facing the same kind of situation that his brother was in, but those people are simply too afraid to reveal themselves. Alongside with the newspaper Aftenposten, he suspects a conspiracy within the deep corridors of finance, politics and the media. In order to find the true answers, Peter must search for a mysterious whistle blower and what happened 25 years earlier.
5	5	"Kapittel 5: Drapet" "Chapter 5: The Murder"	Cecilie Mosli	Gjermund Eriksen	27 January 2014
Peter's nephew Andreas has mysteriously disappeared, but Peter is too afraid to talk to the Police, as he fears that someone might hurt his nephew. Together with his sister-in-law, Eva, and Vibeke, he sets out to find the boy. They find a coded message, which later appears to be a cry for help. As they follow that clue, it leads them to a secret network. Peter realizes that the threats against his brother are about to affect him as well. The snowball is rolling, and it's impossible to stop it.
6	6	"Kapittel 6: Dommedag" "Chapter 6: Doomsday"	Cecilie Mosli	Gjermund Eriksen	3 February 2014
One of Peter's closest people is badly injured, and another one is killed. The police hold Peter as the main suspect for both crimes, making him one of Norway's most hunted men. Peter only trusts his previous boss, Frank Mathisen (Nils Ole Oftebro), and Peter keeps remembering the promise he had made to his brother to take care of his son Andreas. He refuses to break that promise and give up his hope to find him. The hunt for Andreas leads Peter west, and as time is almost running out, he receives help from an unexpected direction.

=== Season 2 (2016) ===
No. overall	No. in season	Title	Directed by	Written by	Original release date
7	1	"Kapittel 1: Blot" "Chapter 1: Blood"	Janic Heen	Margrete Soug Kåset	3 January 2016
When VG journalist Torgrim Hammern is murdered by a masked killer in a parking garage, the fear spreads all across Norway. Some people within the VG newspaper, including Peter Verås (Jon Øigarden), start to suspect that the people behind the killing could be from ISIS. But it's all theory, and Peter starts together with his former boss, Frank Mathiesen (Nils Ole Oftebro), to dig for clues of Hammern's past. It's later revealed that the killing might have an effect on the new coming high rising political world of Norway, where the friendship between Norwegian Prime Minister Michael Woll (Trond Espen Seim) and Minister of Finance Erik Ulrichsen (Ingar Helge Gimle) is not going well in the public spotlight.
8	2	"Kapittel 2: Hedninger" "Chapter 2: Infidels"	Janic Heen	Margrete Soug Kåset	4 January 2016
Peter is put in a position to take care of Hammern’s wife, Ellen Claussen (Laura Christensen). His irritation, besides fascination for her, grows on. The Prime Minister attempts to take care of the consequences following the murder of Hammern, but his rival, Minister of Finance, Erik Ulrichsen has other plans, including getting more power. Ulrichsen tries to set up obstacles in the Prime Minister's path while he also feels left out and wants revenge. Meanwhile, Peter and Mathiesen dig deeper about Hammern, discover he was writing a book about a Minister, and find he secretly recorded messages. As more of the riddle comes to light, the number of enemies multiplies.
9	3	"Kapittel 3: Ragnarok" "Chapter 3: Ragnarok"	Janic Heen	Magrete Soug Kåset	10 January 2016
The daughter of the Norwegian Prime Minister gets bullied via the Internet, and her dark secret puts more pressure over her father. On the same time, the Minister of Finance tries to make the Prime Minister weaker, as a plan of his revenge. Peter tries to figure out who the killed journalist Hammern was writing a book about, and which minister it was. He gets closer to Ellen, and together they also discover some dark secrets in Hammern's private life. Mathiesen tries to help Peter, but ends up in a tough situation, where he gets stabbed in the eye by the mysterious killer, presumed to be the same one that killed Hammern. The Prime Minister later visits him at the hospital, and tells him about the situation. In the hunt for answers, Peter comes together with a computer journalist and finds a log, which shows that Hammern has been talking to someone who goes under the name "No Reason". When Peter meets up with this person, it turns out to be the Prime Minister himself, who gives him the statement that the country is at a risk. Suddenly the killer shows up, kills the guards and shoots the Prime Minister in the eye, before going over to Peter.
10	4	"Kapittel 4: Fimbul" "Chapter 4: Great Winter"	Cecilie Mosli	Margrete Soug Kåset	17 January 2016
Following the attack on Mathiesen and the killing of the Norwegian Prime Minister, Norway is near panic. The President of the United States is unable to attend the funeral of the Norwegian Prime Minister, due to security reasons. The Norwegian political world is in chaos, and Minister of Finance, Erik Ulrichsen, states that he wants to be the acting Prime Minister while the political world gets sorted out, but many of his allies have doubts and force consequences against him, making Ulrichsen more pissed off. In the meantime, Peter and Ellen go further into their investigation of Hammern, and get some unexpected help from Mathiesen, who is finally aware of what had bothered Hammern, and is ready to show it to them. In co-operation with the police, the government tries to track down the new-nazi killers.
11	5	"Kapittel 5: Fenris" "Chapter 5: Wolf"	Vegard Stenberg Eriksen	Margrete Soug Kåset	24 January 2016
Peter, Ellen and Mathiesen are held captive in a basement, where it is revealed that the one who has the captive, was pressured by Mathiesen himself. There is an argument between the three, of who and what it's up to. In the meantime, the government officials try to find a person to lead the investigation of the recent killings, and some theorize they could be due to the recent political actions. But when they hear about the hostage situation, they all focus on it, and Ulrichsen is the one who leads it. Peter is held at gun point by the nephew of the Prime Minister, and he later takes Ellen as his hostage, and goes out of the house. The police arrive, and the nephew threatens to kill Ellen if they don't leave. A police sniper in the woods gets the order from the politicians to take the shot, which he does; after a long while of getting the chance. The hostages are freed, and everything is calmed down for now. The nephew turns out to be the Prime Minister's biological son.
12	6	"Kapittel 6: Jotnir" "Chapter 6: Shadow Gods"	Gjermund Eriksen	Margrete Soug Kåset	31 January 2016
Peter, Ellen and Mathiesen's investigation goes deeper and deeper as they discover more clues that could explain what the mysteries of the political world and the murder of Torgrim Hammern might reveal. It is later revealed that the minister that Hammern was writing about, is Norwegian Prime Minister Michael Woll. While searching for a lead for the case, Mathiesen stumbles upon a warehouse, where he discovers some data files that could explain something. But when he is about to exit, he is held at gunpoint by a gunman and forced to get into a body bag. The gunman executes him.
13	7	"Kapittel 7: Miklagard" "Chapter 7: Constantinople"	Cecilie Mosli	Margrete Soug Kåset	7 February 2016
Ellen and Peter travel to Istanbul. As they take a walk for the evening, an undercover CIA admires the fact that they are from Norway. When the conversation gets a bit out of hand, Peter says that they need to leave, but the American reveals that he is "Melanie" who they were waiting to meet. They access a database at CloudTech about some secret information within the Norwegian political world. Peter doubts first that they are going to get access, until Ellen shows him a finger from Torgrim Hammern. Lying about his identity to security personnel, Peter manages to get access to the computer and downloads the files. He successfully gets back to Ellen before security realises their mistake just as Peter and Ellen leave the building. Later, Ellen and Peter arrive at the docks, where Ellen tells Peter about her double agent working also with the Chinese. Peter doesn't believe her at first, until she says that she only was 19 when it all happened. Peter is captured, and before Ellen can say anything, the CIA agent shoots her and drags Peter with him to a car where the agent questions him about how much he knows about the unknown Norwegian politician in the mysterious picture taken in Istanbul. Peter states that he doesn't know anything, and the car stops. When Ellen turns out to be alive, the agent tells Peter that she is as dead as he is, just that she doesn't know yet.
14	8	"Kapittel 8: Yggdrasil" "Chapter 8: Tree of Knowledge"	Cecilie Mosli	Margrete Soug Kåset	14 February 2016
The pieces of the mysterious puzzle within the Norwegian political world are about to fall into right and proper order. After returning from Istanbul, Peter and Ellen are under high alert and suspicious. The mysterious killer has taken captive Ellen's daughter and her babysitter, Peters sister-in-law Eva, and together with Peter she tracks down the killer to a cargo ship. Peter later discovers that Ellen is working for two sides, but it seems to him that she can't decide which side to stick to. In an incident, Ellen shoots the killer, and Peter calms her down from killing him as well. The police try to talk Ellen down, but Ellen gets shot for hesitating too long. Peter and Eva get off the ship with Ellen's daughter after the police have stormed and searched it. The Norwegian Prime Minister's daughter is persuaded by Ulrichsen in helping him, but as she is giving a speech at a meeting, VG decides to reveal the truth behind the mysterious Istanbul meeting picture, stunning everyone in the country. The minister in the picture was no one other than the Prime Minister Woll himself. Woll's daughter is taken away in tears and Ulrichsen gets mad at her for a moment, and it's also revealed that Hammern also spoke to Woll about the bad prize value of working in Norway, but Woll stated that it was something he couldn't help with. Ulrichsen then states to the press that the government is resigning.

== Awards and nominations ==
Year	Organization	Category	Nominee(s)	Result	Ref.
2017	45th International Emmy Awards	Best Drama Series	Mammon (Season 2)	Won	
