= Vidar Johansen (musician) =

Norwegian jazz musician (born 1953)

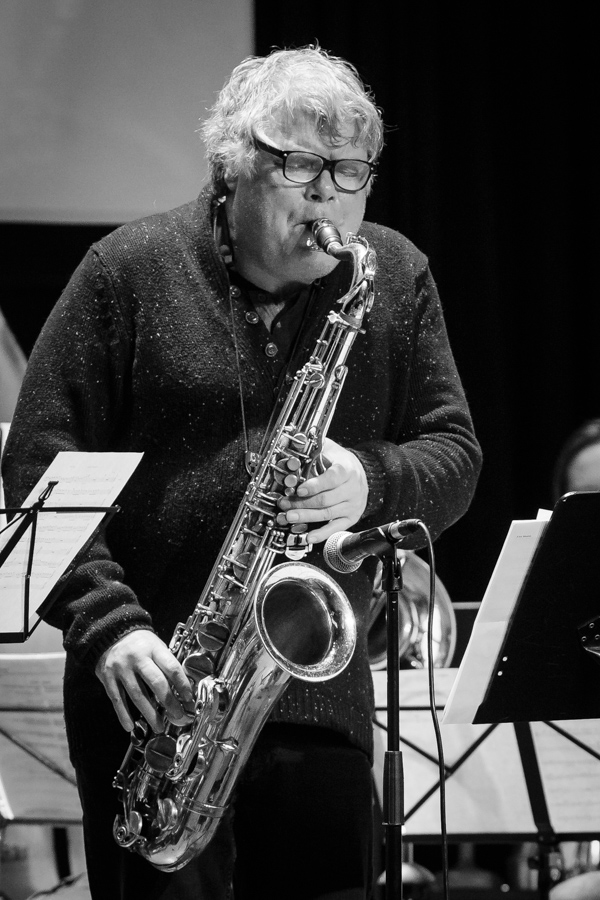
- Johansen in 2016

Background information
- Born: 2 June 1953 (age 73); Oslo
- Origin: Norway
- Genres: Jazz
- Occupations: Musician, band leader and composer
- Instruments: Saxophones, bass clarinet, flute
- Labels: Curling Legs; Jazzaway; ECM

Vidar Johansen (born 2 June 1953 in Oslo, Norway) is a Norwegian jazz musician (tenor, soprano, baritone and alto saxophones, flute, bass clarinet), music arranger and composer.

== Biography ==
Johansen is considered one of the most talented saxophonists to emerge out of the Norwegian jazz scene in the 1970s. He started out early 1970 in a quartet with Jon Eberson, and collaborated with the Balke brothers. He also collaborated within Jon Balke Quartet (1973–74), "The amateur big band" in Kongsberg (1974), in the jazz-rock band "Adonis" (1974–75), and was recognized in his quartet led together with Erik Balke (1974–77), playing at the Moldejazz and Vossajazz festivals in 1975 and 1976, respectively.

He was also a member of the University Big Band in Oslo (1977), inter alia, "Hipshot Percussion" 1976–1978, "Shrub Smoul" 1977–78, jazz rock group "Lotus" from 1977 to 1983 with an album (1979), Espen Rud's "Kråbøl" 1978, a quartet with bassist Åsmund Snortheim (1978–79), Åge Røthe Quartet 1979–80), "Lille Frøen Saksofonkvartett" (1979–89) joining in several festival gigs and the album 4 men (1986), Per Høglend Sextet (1980–81), Anne-Marie Giørtz Quintet (1982–87) with albums released in 1983 and 1985. In 1984 he joined the band "Out to Lunch", and they released the albums Out To Lunch (1988) and Kullboksrytter (1994), Oslo 13 1986–1992, Ole Jacob Hansen / Harald Gundhus big band from 1988 trio with Kåre Garnes and Tom Olstad (1990), Søyr from 1991 with the album release Buses homesick 1993 and The meat and love (1995), Grand Slam and Quartet Decisive from 1992, besides that he has been frequently substitute in Radio big band 1978– 90 (pl.innsp. 1987), participated in the Per Husby Dedication Orchestra from 1984 to 1988 (pl.innsp. 1985, 87) and recorded discs with The Gambian / Norwegian Friendship Orchestra 1982, Jens Wendelboe Big Band in 1983, Lars Martin Myhre / Slagen Big Band (1983–85), "Jazz on Norwegian" 1990 Jens Wendelboe Big Crazy Energy Band from 1991 to 1992, Knut Kristiansen Monk Moods (1995), Odd Børretzen / Lars Martin Myhre (1995), Eivind Aarset (1997), "Element" (1998) and Lars Martin Myhre (1998–99), Kjell Karlsen Big Band (2001), Ron Olsen (2002) and Paul Weeden (2003).

In recent years he has, among other things contributed as soloist on bass clarinet on plates with Søyr, Ab und Zu and Bugge Wesseltoft (1995–1996). As composer known for his subtle titles, compositional documentation as on the album Nordjazz Big 5 recorded by Danish Radio Big Band in 1987 and Sony Simmons plays the music of Vidar Johansen – The traveler (2004–05).

Finally he released an album Lopsided (1997) under his own name, Vidar Johansen Trio record live at Oslo Jazzhus in 1995. Along with Bjørnar Andresen and Thomas Strønen he formed the band "Bayashi" who released the album Help Is on Its Way (2001) and Rock (2004). Later he participated in the Tine Asmundsen Lonely Woman albums Alive (2003), Demons' Diversions (2005), Radegund (2008) and Lovely Luna (2012), the album Bjørn Johansen in Memoriam (2003), Jacob Young's Evening falls (2004) and Sideways (2006), Erik Wesseltoft Con Amor (2004), Life Is A Beautiful Monster with Crimetime Orchestra (2004), Sonny Simmons The traveler (2004) and the album Madison where he collaborates with Tine Asmundsen, Richard Davis and Robert Shy (2007).

In recent years (2015) he has been living on a mountain farm in Lom, which does not prevent him from the participations on the Norwegian jazz scenes. In 2009 he released three albums, his own Lost Animals, The Core & More Vol 1 and Atomic Symphony by Crime Time Orchestra, Sonny Simmons and The Norwegian Radio Orchestra.

== Selected discography ==
=== Solo albums ===
With Vidar Johansen Trio
- 1997: Lopsided (Curling Legs), Live at Oslo Jazzhus
With Vidar Johansen Quartet
- 2009: Lost Animals (Jazzaway Records)

=== Collaborations ===
With Jens Wendelboe Big Band
- 1983: 'Lone Attic (NOPA)
With The Gambian / Norwegian Friendship Orchestra
- 1983: Friendship (Odin Records)
With Anne-Marie Giørtz Band
- 1985: Tigers of Pain (Odin Records)
With The Per Husby Orchestra
- 1985: Dedications (Affinity Records)
- 1987: Your Eyes (NOPA)
With Egil Monn-Iversens Storband fest. Sylfest Strutle
- 1985: Live at Gildevangen (Camp Records)
With "Lille Frøen Saksofonkvartett»
- 1986: 4 menn (Odin Records)
With "Out To Lunch»
- 1988: Out To Lunch (Odin Records)
- 1995: Kullboksrytter (Curling Legs), with The Norwegian String Quartet and Sidsel Endresen
With "Element»
- 1996: Element (Turn Left Prod)
- 1999: Shaman (Blå Productions)
With "Bayashi»
- 2003: Help Is on Its Way (Ayler Records)
- 2004: Rock (Jazzaway Records)
With Tine Asmundsen Lonely Woman
- 2003: Alive (Hazel Jazz)
- 2005: Demons' Diversions (Hazel Jazz)
- 2008: Radegund (Hazel Jazz)
- 2012: Lovely Luna (Hazel Jazz)
With Jacob Young
- 2004: Evening falls (ECM Records)
- 2006: Sideways (ECM Records)
With Erik Wesseltoft Quintet
- 2004: Con Amor (Normann Records)
With Tine Asmundsen, Richard Davis, Robert Shy
- 2007: Madison (Hazel Jazz)
With The Core & More
- 2009: Vol 1 – The Art of No Return (Moserobie Records)
With The Crime Time Orchestra, Sonny Simmons and The Norwegian Radio Orchestra
- 2009: Atomic Symphony (Jazzaway Records)
With John Surman and Bergen Big Band
- 2014: Another Sky (Grappa Music)
Compilations
- 2003: Bjørn Johansen in Memoriam (Hot Club Records), with various artists
- 2010: Jazz From Norway 2010 JazzCD.No 4th Set (Norsk Jazz Forum), with various artists
