= Bloodride =

2020 Norwegian Netflix series

- Promotional poster
- Genre: Horror
- Created by: Kjetil Indregard; Atle Knudsen
- Directed by: Geir Henning Hopland; Atle Knudsen
- Starring: Stig R. Amdam; Anna Bache-Wiig; Ellen Bendu
- Country of origin: Norway
- Original language: Norwegian
- No. of seasons: 1
- No. of episodes: 6

Production
- Running time: 27–33 minutes
- Production companies: Monster Scripted AS; Netflix

Original release
- Network: Netflix
- Release: 13 March 2020

Bloodride is a 2020 Norwegian anthology television series created by Kjetil Indregard and Atle Knudsen and starring Stig R. Amdam, Anna Bache-Wiig and Ellen Bendu. The plot revolves around a bus and its driver, driving in the rain in the middle of the night. In each episode, one of the passengers exits the bus and becomes the focus of the episode.

It was released on Friday 13 March 2020, on Netflix.

== Cast ==
- Stig R. Amdam as Edmund Bråthen
- Anna Bache-Wiig as Iselin
- Ellen Bendu as Sanna
- Bjørn Birch as Herr Kloppen
- Pia Borgli as Margrethe
- Simen Bostad as Marcus
- Mette Spjelkavik Enoksen as Monika
- Elias Er-Rachidi Freuchen as Odd
- Molly Gavin as Sissel
- David Haack as Georg
- Jasmine Haugen as Unni
- Benjamin Helstad as Otto
- Dagny Backer Johnsen as Olivia
- Rebekka Jynge as Kristin
- Sophia Kaushal as Butikkdame
- Karl Vidar Lende as Paul
- Hilde Olausson as Fru Kloppen
- Henrik Rafaelsen as Alex
- Harald Rosenstrøm as Georg
- Kingsford Siayor as Abdi
- Emma Spetalen Magnusson as Katja
- Silje Storstein as Helene
- Bjørnar Teigen as Leon
- Trond Teigen as Philip
- Isabel Beth Toming as Oda
- Erlend Rødal Vikhagen as Erik
- Ingrid Vollan as Fru Kloppen sin vennenne
- Catharina Vu as Bensinstasjonsansatt
- Rj Wayne as Bill
- Ine Marie Wilmann as Molly
- Frode Winther as Rektor Ogland
- Ella Indregard Yttri as Mari
- Ingrid Anne Yttri as Trine
- Ingunn Øien as Agda

== Episodes ==
No.	Title	Directed by	Written by	Original release date
1	"Ultimate Sacrifice"	Geir Henning Hopland	Kjetil Indregard - Atle Knudsen	13 March 2020
2	"Three Sick Brothers"	Atle Knudsen	Kjetil Indregard - Atle Knudsen	13 March 2020
3	"Bad Writer"	Geir Henning Hopland	Kjetil Indregard - Atle Knudsen	13 March 2020
4	"Lab Rats"	Geir Henning Hopland	Kjetil Indregard - Atle Knudsen	13 March 2020
5	"The Old School"	Atle Knudsen	Kjetil Indregard - Atle Knudsen	13 March 2020
6	"The Elephant in the Room"	Geir Henning Hopland	Kjetil Indregard - Atle Knudsen	13 March 2020

== Release ==
Bloodride was released on 13 March 2020 on Netflix.
