= Batagraf =

Norwegian percussion ensemble

- Origin: Oslo, Norway
- Genres: Jazz, lyrics and percussion
- Years active: 2005-
- Label: ECM Records
- Members: Jon Balke; Helge Norbakken; Snorre Bjerck
- Past members: Emilie Stoesen Christensen; Erland Dahlen; Torgeir Rebolledo Pedersen; Ingar Zach; Kenneth Ekornes; Harald Skullerud; Frode Nymo; Arve Henriksen; Solveig Slettahjell; Jennifer Myskja Balke; Jocely Sete Camara Silva; Svante Henryson; Morten Hannisdal; Miki N'Doye; Sidsel Endresen
- Website: Magnetic Music Official Website

Batagraf (established 2005 in Oslo, Norway) is a Norwegian percussion ensemble, created and led by Jon Balke. Formed in 2003, the concept of the group was to research and investigate the relation between rhythm and language, inspired by various African and ethnic traditions. The group functions as a core group with a pool of collaborators.

In 2009, they attended the Nattjazz in Bergen with the entertainers Are Kalvø and Espen Beranek Holm, two of Norway's most popular radio personalities, for the show «Pratagraph» gaining brilliant reviews.

Batagraf has also collaborated with sound poets like Jaap Blonk and Sidsel Endresen, as well as rappers and instrumental soloists like Runar Gudnason, Nils Petter Molvaer, Arve Henriksen, and more.

== Members ==
- Jon Balke (keyboards, electronics, tungoné, darbouka, percussion)
- Helge Norbakken (sabar, gorong, djembe, talking drum, shakers, percussion)
- Snorre Bjerck (gorong, percussion)

== Discography ==
- 2005: Statements (ECM Records)
- 2011:Say And Play (ECM Records)
- 2016: On Anodyne (Grappa Music), with Trondheim Voices
- 2018: Delights of Decay (Jazzland Recordings, with No.4, Mathias Eick and Trygve Seim
