= Kenneth Ekornes =

Norwegian jazz percussionist

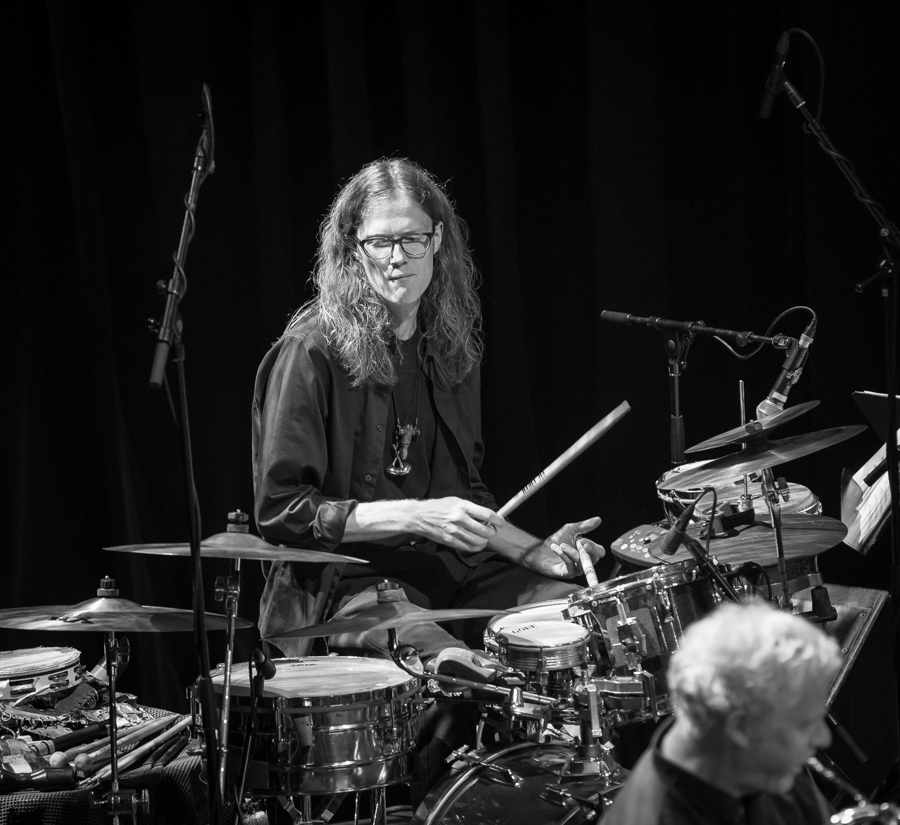
- Ekornes at the 2017 Oslo Jazzfestival

Background information
- Born: 7 July 1974 (age 51); Sykkylven Municipality, Møre og Romsdal
- Origin: Norway
- Genres: Jazz
- Occupations: Musician, composer
- Instruments: Drums and other percussion
- Website: www.tordg.no/nymark/kenneth.htm

Kenneth Ekornes (born 7 July 1974 in Sykkylven Municipality, Norway) is a Norwegian jazz musician (percussion) and member of the 'Brazz Brothers', known from a number of recordings, as well as for his multiethnic musical expression and his creative use of electronics.

== Career ==
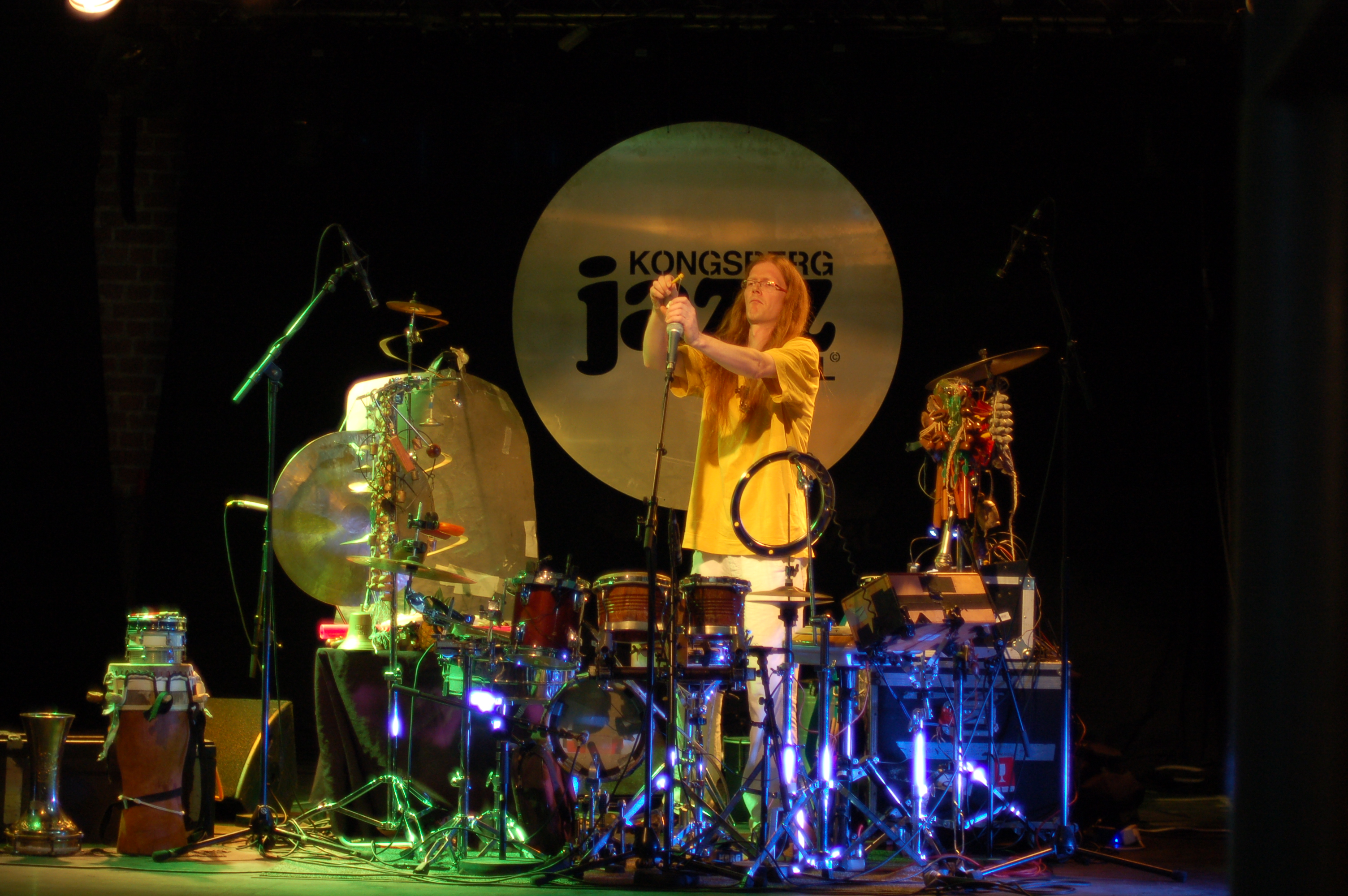
Kenneth Ekornes performing Barnivalkonsert at Kongsberg Jazzfestival 2010.

Ekornes is a graduate of the Rhythm program at Høgskolen i Agder and play in bands like Desafinado, Nymark Collective, Gumbo, Batagraf led by Jon Balke (Statements, 2005). He also appears on Jai Shankar's Ragajazz, and is in the new lineup of Ab und Zu.

He has collaborated with Trio de Janeiro, Føyk, Ole Paus, Baba Nation, Mari Boine (Eight seasons, 2002), Ingor Ánte Áilo Gaup, Trond-Viggo Torgersen (Barnetimen for de store, 2002) and Vintermåne (2002), Terje Gewelt/Bjørn Klakegg, Frode Alnæs. Med Unni Løvlid turnerte han Rikskonsertene med indisk folkemusikk (2006). Tidligere har han turnert med oppsetningene Draumetid, samt Kenneth i 100.

== Discography ==
With Zotora

- 1998: Emigrate (Circular Recordings), including with Eivind Aarset

Within Føyk

- 1999: Kraaka (Heilo)

Within Nymark Collective

- 2000: First Meeting (Sonor Records)
- 2002: Contemporary Tradition (Sonor Records)
- 2008: Bessie Smith Revisited Live in Concert (Nymark Collective Records), with Kristin Asbjørnsen

With Ahmad Mansour

- 2001: Apples and Oranges (Resonant Music)

With Vintermåne

- 2002: Vintermåne (2L)

With Geir Lysne

- 2002: Aurora Borealis – Nordic Lights (ACT Music), Suite For Jazz Orchestra
- 2003: Korall (ACT Music), G.L. Listening Ensemble featuring Sondre Bratland

With John Vegard Show

- 2002: Hvor Er Du? (Concordia Culture)

With Trond-Viggo Torgersen

- 2002: Barnetimen For De Store (EMI Records)

Within Skruk

- 2003: Krybberom (Kirkelig Kulturverksted), with Rim Banna
- 2003: Dype Stille Sterke Milde (Kirkelig Kulturverksted), with Nymark Collective
- 2010: I Vinens Speil (Kirkelig Kulturverksted), featuring Mahsa Vahdat
- 2010: Til Alle Tider (Kirkelig Kulturverksted), compilation

With Terje Gewelt

- 2004: Small World (Resonant Music)
- 2007: If Time Stood Still (Resonant Music)
- 2011: Selected Works (Resonant Music), compilation

Within Batagraf

- 2005: Statements (ECM Records)
- 2011: Say And Play (ECM Records)

Within Gumbo

- 2006: Gumbo (Schmell Records)

With Frank Kvinge

- 2006: Small Stories (Ponca Jazz)

With Helene Bøksle

- 2006: Elverhøy (Polydor Records)

With Karl Seglem

- 2010: Ossicles (NorCD)

With Diom de Kossa

- 2010: Baba Toulenga (In My Fathers Shadow) (ta:lik)

With Chika Asamoto and Gus Till

- 2010: Catalpa (Les Vagues Records)

Within The Source

- 2012: The Source Of Summer (Grappa Music)
