= Line Verndal =

Norwegian actress (born 1972)

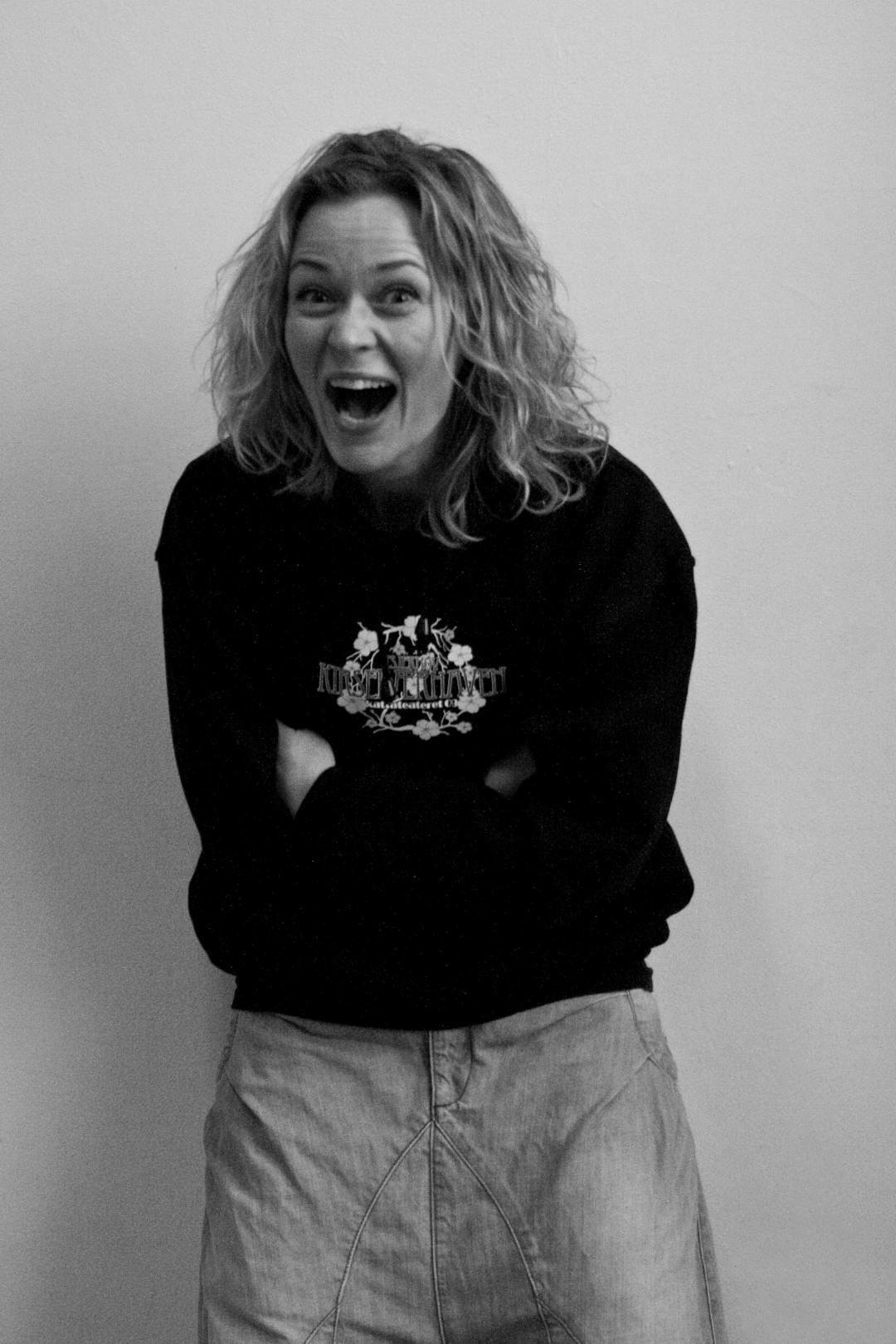
- Verndal in 2009
- Born: Line Cecilie Verndal; 23 March 1972 (age 54); Oslo, Norway
- Occupation: Actress
- Years active: 1995–present

Line Cecilie Verndal (born 23 March 1972) a Norwegian actress born in Oslo. She has worked in theatre, television, and film.

== Selected filmography ==
=== Film ===
List of film appearances, with year, title, and role shown
| Year | Title | Role | Notes |
|---|---|---|---|
| 2002 | I Am Dina | Greta | |
| 2007 | 5 Lies | Angela | |
| 2010 | Limbo | Sonia Moe | |
| 2012 | Mad Ship | Solveig | |

=== Television ===
List of television appearances, with year, title, and role shown
| Year | Title | Role | Notes |
|---|---|---|---|
| 1995 | Lille Lørdag | Benedicte | 1 episode |
| 2001 | Nissene på låven | Kine Messel | 24 episodes |
| 2002 | Lekestue | Jonathan's mother | 2 episodes |
| 2002 | Brigaden | Andrea Seiersted | 2 episodes |
| 2004 | Seks som oss | Malin | 2 episodes |
| 2008–10 | Himmelblå | Marit Pedersen | 24 episodes |
| 2011 | Nissene over skog og hei | Kine Messel | 24 episodes |
| 2016–18 | Aber Bergen | Diana Drange | 30 episodes |
| 2018–19 | Det kunne vært verre | Anne | 2 episodes |
| 2019–20 | Home for Christmas | Eira | 9 episodes |
| 2020–21 | Ragnarok | Bjørg | 6 episodes |
| 2021 | Nissene i bingen | Kine | 24 episodes |
| 2022 | A Storm for Christmas | Trine | 5 episodes |
| 2023 | Føkkings Fladseth | Line | 4 episodes |
