= Ole Henrik Giørtz =

Norwegian jazz pianist, arranger and bandleader

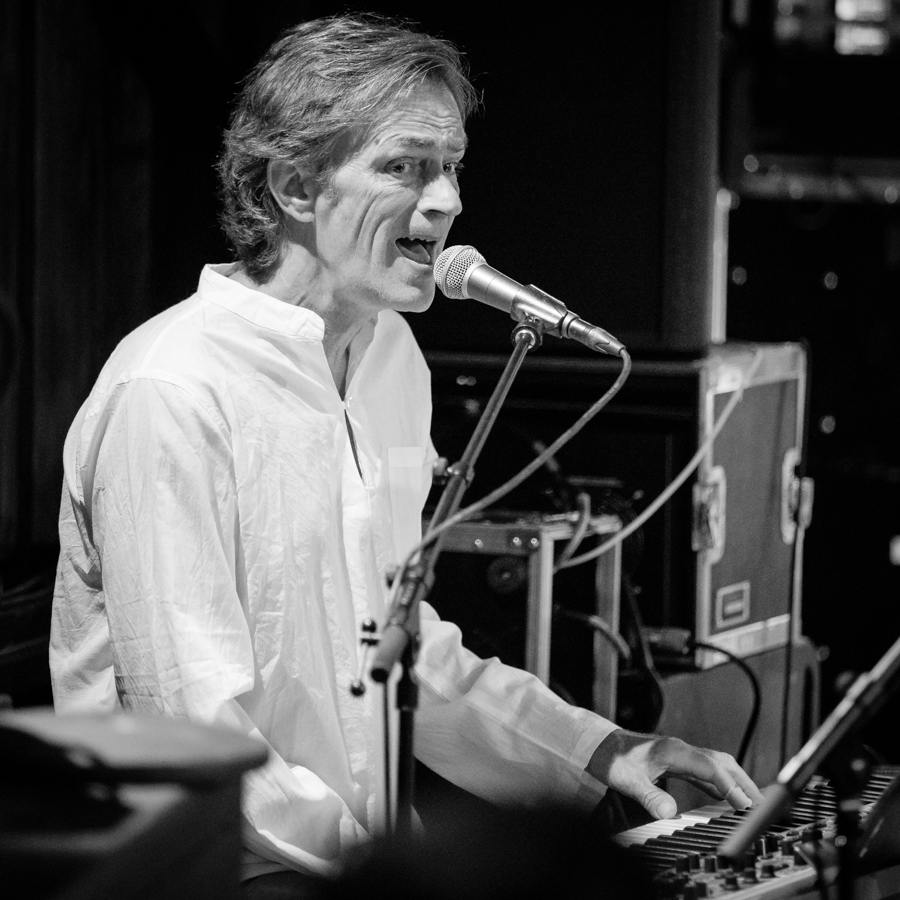
- Giørtz performing in 2018

Background information
- Born: 10 January 1955 (age 71); Bærum, Norway
- Genres: Jazz
- Occupations: Musician, composer
- Instrument: Piano
- Labels: Curling Legs, EMI

Ole Henrik Giørtz (born 10 January 1955) is a Norwegian jazz pianist, arranger and bandleader, the older brother of jazz singer Anne-Marie Giørtz. He is known from a number of recordings, and has contributed to several recordings and tours within bands such as Bazar, Chipahua, Erik Wøllo Quintet, Terje Rypdal Trio and Anne Grete Preus, and festival debut at Vossajazz 1977 and attended Moldejazz 1979, within the band Lotus.

== Career ==
Giørtz was born in Bærum, and became a member of his sister's band Ab und Zu, where he also fulfilled the roles of composer and arranger. He was responsible for the commissioned work Den akustiske skygge (Moldejazz, 1993), and composed the music for Lars Saabye Christensen's Skrapjern og silke (1998) commissioned work for Moldejazz, which led to Edvard Prize nomination 1999. To "Sandvika Storbandfestival" skrev han Rhymes at Midnight (2004), fremført med Ab und Zu and Prime Time Orchestra. Giørtz played within the Brazilian-Norwegian Claudio & Cristina Latini Band, also here as arranger and producer in addition to musical performances. This cooperation gave rise to album releases Sol e Cachaça (1988) and Cor de Dendê (1990). «Horns for hire".

Giørtz leads his own Quartet featuring Tore Brunborg (saxophone), Tine Asmundsen (bass), and Svein Christiansen (drums). Melodic jazz, playing compositions of Wayne Shorter, Herbie Hancock, Joe Henderson, Charlie Haden, and others. In addition he wrote the book Noter og andre nøtter – en brukerveiledning i pop- og jazzharmonikk (2006).

== Discography ==
Within Bazar

- 1973: Det er ikke enkelt (Samspill)
- 1974: Drabantbyrock (Mai)

With Anne-Marie Giørtz

- 1983: Breaking Out (Odin Records)

Within Claudio & Cristina Latini Band

- 1988: Sol e Cachaça (IPE Records)
- 1990: Cor de Dendê (Bums Records)

Within Ab und Zu

- 1989: Ab und Zu (Curling Legs)
- 1996: Totally (Curling Legs)
- 2002: Spark of life (Curling Legs)

With Lars Saabye Christensen, Ole Henrik Giørtz, Anne Marie Almedal, Kristin Kajander & Elin Rosseland

- 1999: Skrapjern og silke (Grappa Music)
