= Nicholas Sillitoe =

Nicholas "Nick" Sillitoe (born September 1971) is an English composer/music producer.

Based in Norway, Sillitoe won the 2015 Amanda Award for Best Music for the film Dirk Ohm.

Sillitoe has composed the music for the Norwegian TV-drama series Okkupert.

He is married to Velvet Belly singer Anne Marie Almedal.
