= Anna Bache-Wiig =

Norwegian actress and writer (born 1975)

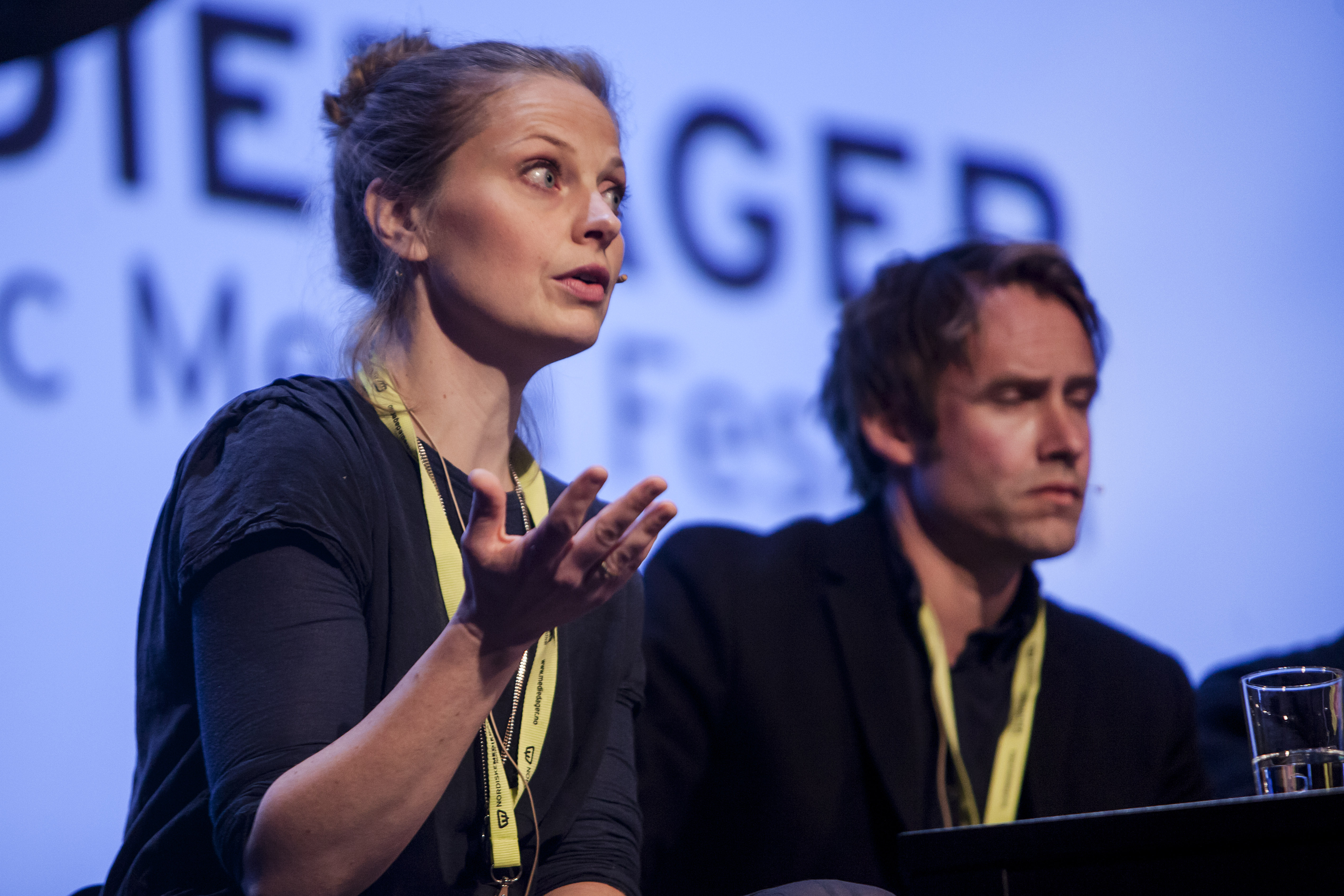
- Bache-Wiig in 2013
- Born: September 19, 1975 (age 50)
- Occupations: Actress, novelist, screenwriter
- Notable work: Frikjent, Utøya: July 22

Anna Bache-Wiig (born 19 September 1975) is a Norwegian actress and writer. She is best known for writing the screenplay for the film Utøya: July 22 in collaboration with Siv Rajendram Eliassen.

== Early career ==
Bache-Wiig was educated at the Norwegian National Academy of Theatre (Norwegian: Statens teaterhøgskole). She published a novel in 2003 called Det aller fineste. She then published Sommernattsdrømmen (2005) and Lasses hus (2009). In 2010, she published a picture book entitled Don Fridtjof.

== Acting ==
Bache-Wiig has acted in several Norwegian television series, such as Mammon and Frikjent. She also appeared in Pål Sletaune's acclaimed 2005 thriller Next Door. In 2020, she starred in one episode of the Netflix series Bloodride.

== Screen writing ==
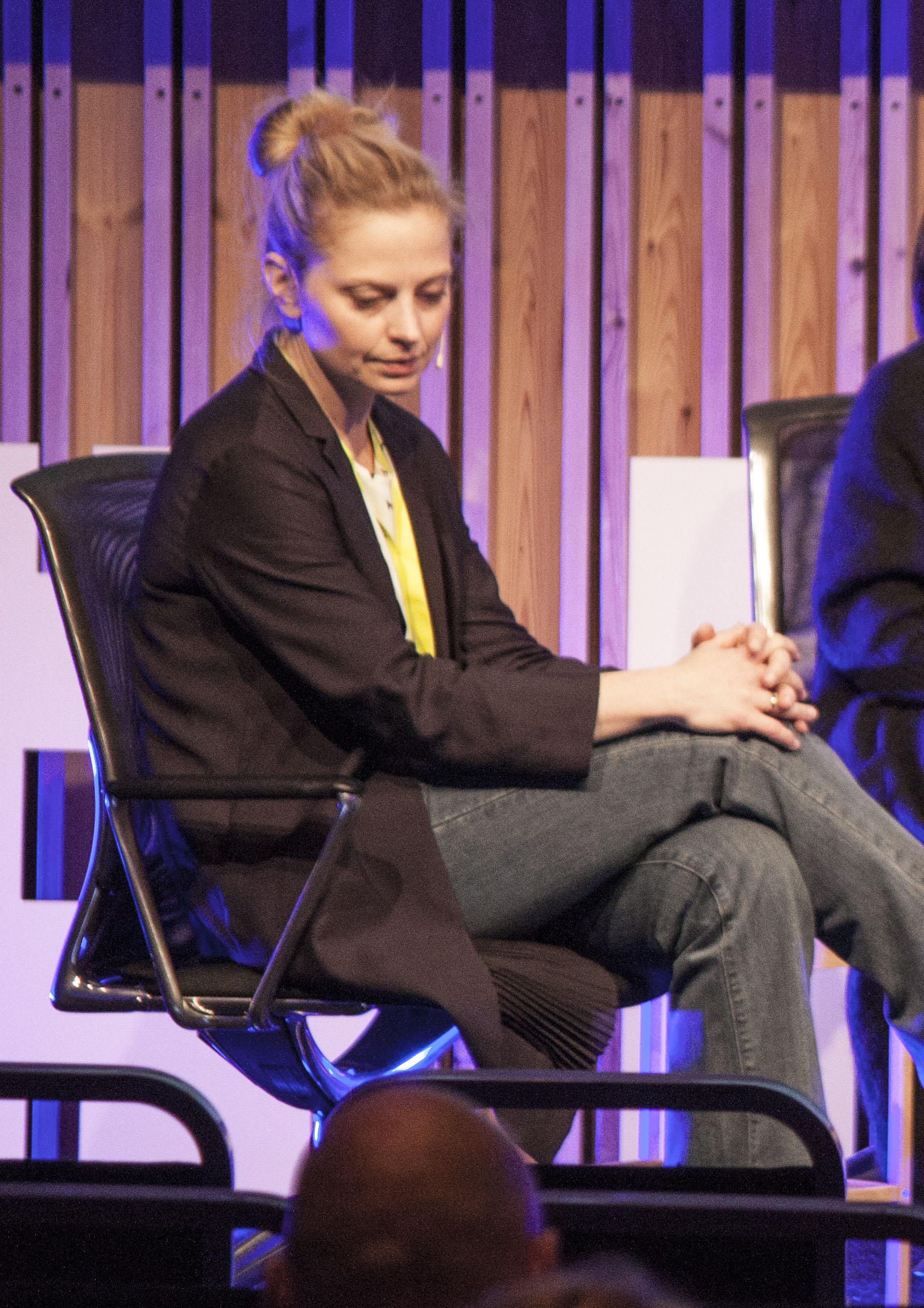
Bache-Wiig in 2015

Together with Siv Rajendram Eliassen, Bache-Wiig created and wrote the first season of the television series Frikjent (Acquitted) in 2016. In the UK, it was screened on Walter Presents, a video on demand service provided by Channel 4.

Bache-Wiig and Eliassen then collaborated on the screenplay for the film Utøya: July 22. They received an honourable mention at the Berlin International Film Festival 2018. The two stayed teamed up with director Erik Poppe to write a new screenplay, The Emigrants, which will be released in 2020.
