= Sebastian Warholm =

Norwegian actor

- Born: 1995; Oslo
- Known for: 'Nure' in the "Linus i Svingen and Jul i Svingen"

Sebastian Warholm (born 1995 in Oslo) is a Norwegian actor from Oslo, with roots in Brønnøysund.

He is arguably one of the most prominent child actors in Norway today, having starred as 'Robin' in all three seasons of Himmelblå, the most successful drama series in Norwegian TV history. Before this he was already a seasoned actor, known as 'Nure' in the popular family series Linus i Svingen and Jul i Svingen (Christmas in Svingen). He also hosted the kids TV show Barnas Supershow and in 2009 played the title role in the music video to The Blacksheeps-song Edwin, about a boy who wears women's clothing and dreams of becoming a girl.

In 2009, he nearly lost his life while vacationing in Gran Canaria, when he was surprised by a massive wave that pulled him away from the beach and out to sea. Just as he started to drown he was rescued by another tourist from Norway. Warholm later admitted that he struggled with trauma after his near-death experience.
