= Ab und Zu =

Norwegian jazz band

- Origin: Oslo, Norway
- Genres: Jazz
- Years active: 1987–present
- Labels: Hot Club, Odin, Curling Legs, Grappa Music
- Members: Anne-Marie Giørtz; Ole Henrik Giørtz; Vidar Johansen; Olaf Kamfjord; Kenneth Ekornes
- Past members: Audun Kleive; Finn Sletten; Eivind Aarset; Paolo Vinaccia; Kim Ofstad; Tore Brunborg

Ab und Zu (established 1987) is a Norwegian jazz band, originally named "Anne Marie Giørtz Quintet" (1982–1987), and presenting music written by Ole Henrik Giørtz.

== Biography ==
The quintet comprised the siblings Anne-Marie Giørtz (vocals) and Ole Henrik Giørtz (piano), together with Vidar Johansen (saxophone), Audun Kleive (drums) and Olaf Kamfjord (bass). The first record release was Breaking out (1983), followed by Tigers of pain (1985), where drummer Audun Kleive was substituted for Finn Sletten. Tigers of pain was the first album where they present lyrics by Fran Landesman.

The band changed name in 1987, and released the album Ab und Zu (1989) with two substitutes in the band, drummer Paolo Vinaccia and guitarist Eivind Aarset. At Moldejazz they performed the commissions Den akustiske skyggen (1993) and Skrapjern og silke (1999), both presenting lyrics by Lars Saabye Christensen. When they released the next album Totally (1996) the drummer Kim Ofstad was in the line-up. The last album release was Spark of life (2002).

With the big band Prime Time Orchestra they performed the commissioned work Rhymes at midnight at «Sandvika Storbandfestival» (2004), this time also presenting lyrics by Fran Landesman. The lineup on this project is with Kenneth Ekornes (drums) and Tore Brunborg (saxophone).

== Band members ==
- Anne–Marie Giørtz – vocal
- Ole Henrik Giørtz – piano
- Vidar Johansen – saxophone
- Tore Brunborg – saxophone
- Olaf Kamfjord – bass
- Kenneth Ekornes – drums

== Former members ==
Anne Marie Giørtz Quintet

- Audun Kleive – drums
- Finn Sletten – drums

== Former members ==
Ab und Zu

- Eivind Aarset – guitar
- Paolo Vinaccia – drums
- Kim Ofstad – drums

== Discography ==
As Anne Marie Giørtz Quintet

- 1983: Breaking out (Hot Club)
- 1985: Tigers of pain (Odin)

As Ab und Zu

- 1989: Ab und Zu (Curling Legs)
- 1996: Totally (Curling Legs)
- 1999: Skrapjern og silke (Grappa)
- 2002: Spark of life (Curling Legs)
