= Erik Wesseltoft =

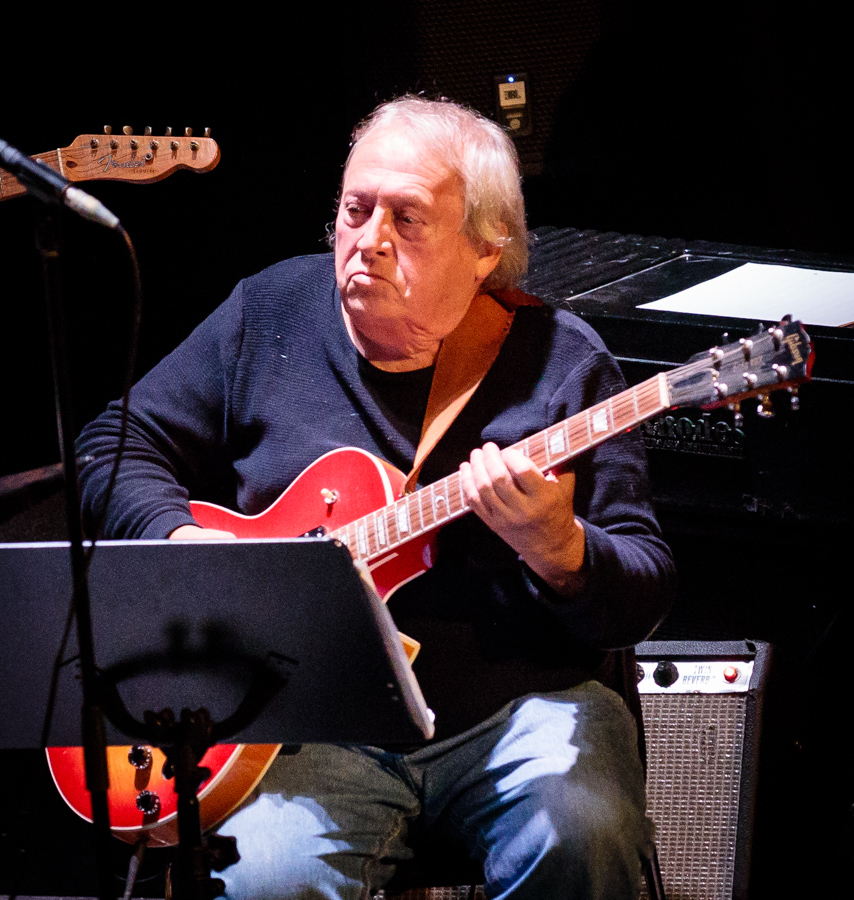
- Wesseltoft at Cosmopolite Oslo in 2017

Background information
- Born: 1944 (age 81–82); Porsgrunn, Telemark
- Origin: Norway
- Genres: Jazz
- Occupations: Musician and composer
- Instrument: Guitar
- Website: www.erikwesseltoft.com

Erik Wesseltoft (born 1944) is a Norwegian jazz guitarist and composer, married to pharmacist Randi Ersdal (1944–), and the father of jazz pianist Bugge Wesseltoft (1964–).

== Biography ==
Wesseltoft was born in Porsgrunn. As a guitarist, he has played a modest but important role in Norwegian jazz and theater music. In 2004 his first album, Con Amore, was released, and in 2013 the follow-up To Someone I Knew. His world-famous son, Bugge Wesseltoft, contributes elpiano and piano on both records. In addition Vidar Johansen and Harald Johnsen contributed on the 2004 edition, and Carl Magnus Neumann contributed on the 2013 album, in addition to well known musicians like Knut Riisnæs, Roger Arntzen, and Frode Nymo.

== Discography ==
- 2004: Con Amore (Normann Records)
- 2013: To Someone I Knew (Normann Records)
