= Mad Ship =

- Official release poster
- Directed by: David Mortin
- Written by: David Mortin; Maureen Dorey-Lukie; Patricia Fogliato
- Produced by: David Mortin; Patricia Fogliato; Elizabeth Jarvis
- Starring: Nikolaj Lie Kaas; Gil Bellows; Rachel Blanchard; Martha Burns; Aidan Devine; Gage Munroe; Line Verndal
- Cinematography: Michael Marshall
- Edited by: Mike Munn
- Music by: John Gzowski
- Release dates: November 30, 2012 (Whistler); December 7, 2012 (Winnipeg)
- Running time: 90 minutes
- Country: Canada
- Languages: English; Danish; Norwegian

Mad Ship is a 2012 Canadian period drama film directed by David Mortin, from a screenplay by Mortin, Maureen Dorey-Lukie, and Patricia Fogliato. The film stars Nikolaj Lie Kaas, Gil Bellows, Rachel Blanchard, Martha Burns, Aidan Devine, Gage Munroe, and Line Verndal. Set during the Great Depression, it follows Tomas Sorensen (Kaas), a Norwegian man who emigrates with his family to Canada to establish a wheat dynasty, but when his wife Solveig (Verndal) dies, he embarks on a mission to build a ship and return her body to Norway.

Mad Ship premiered at the Whistler Film Festival on November 30, 2012, to mixed reviews from critics.

== Plot ==
A poor young Scandinavian immigrant couple winds up in Canada in search of prosperity, but the hardship of the Great Depression takes a toll in a way they never feared when they went in search of the dream. Mad Ship tells the true story of a Scandinavian immigrant who built a boat to carry the body of his dead wife.

== Cast ==
- Nikolaj Lie Kaas as Tomas
- Gil Bellows as Cameron
- Rachel Blanchard as Adeline
- Martha Burns as Judith
- Aidan Devine as Edmund
- Gage Munroe as Petter
- Line Verndal as Solveig

== Development ==
The house and barn used in the film were built on the set.

== Reception ==
Mad Ship received mostly mixed reviews. said "Continuity might have conferred something of the stark, affecting sobriety of a Scandinavian film that Mad Ship seems to be aiming for." The Toronto Star said "There’s more to Mad Ship than what is on the surface, and Mortin — ably assisted by Michael Marshall’s gorgeous cinematography — gets there in the end. But not without a few rough seas in the telling of the tale." Canada.com said "Despite the excellent period production design that allows us to enter 1920s Manitoba, its desperate message of survival seems crafted for today’s world as economic uncertainty, hefty unemployment and poor stewardship of the land has left the rest of us searching for a rescue vessel on the greasy plains of 21st century progress." Digital Journal said "It's a strange film, although one with gorgeous visual images to spare."

== Release ==
Mad Ship was screened at the Raindance Film Festival.
