= Emilie Stoesen Christensen =

Norwegian jazz singer and actor

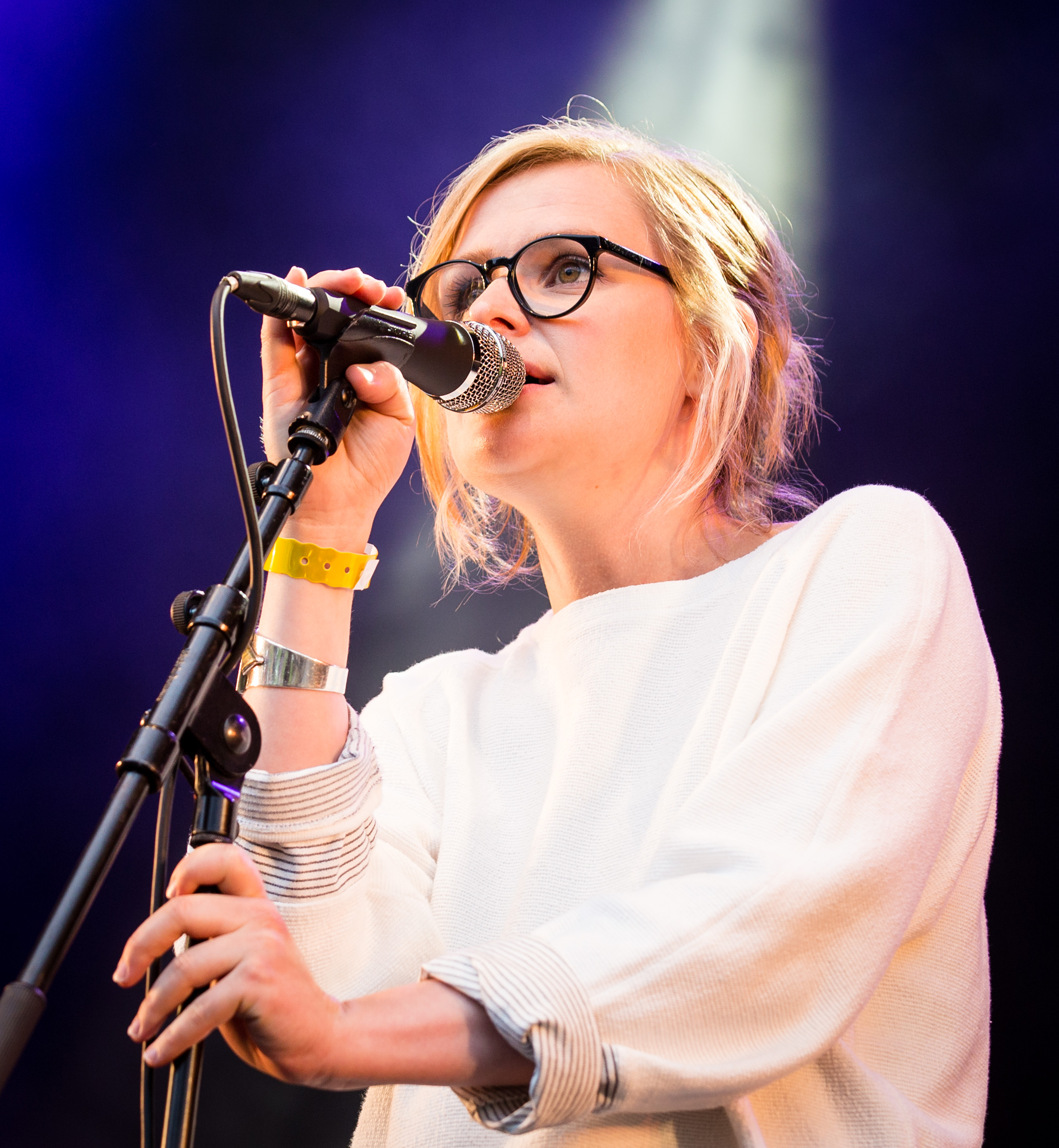

Background information
- Born: 1986 (age 38–39); Oslo
- Origin: Norway
- Genres: Jazz
- Occupation(s): Musician, actor
- Instrument: Vocals
- Website: sceneweb.no/nb/artist/18336/Emilie_Stoesen_Christensen

Emilie Stoesen Christensen (born 1986 in Oslo, Norway) is a Norwegian jazz singer and actor, the daughter of Jazz drummer Jon Christensen (1943–2020) and actress Ellen Horn (b. Stoesen in 1951), and half sister of Theater director Kjersti Horn (b. 1977). She has lately been gaining recognition for her work with a number of Norwegian bands, including the «Oslo JazzNonett», and made her record debut with Jon Balke's Batagraf album Say And Play (2011) at ECM Records.

== Career ==
Christensen has played roles in musical plays as Spellemann på taket (Fiddler on the Roof) and Spring awakening at Oslo Nye Teater.

As a student at the Norges Musikkhøgskole (NMH) in Oslo, she was on a Norway tour (2012) with «Oslo JazzNonett», and among other places, they had chosen «Musikkbaren» at NMH as a concert arena (at home). All music is original, written by the band members: Christensen (vocals and text), Magela Herrera Portuondo (flute), Kasper Skullerud Værens (alto saxophone and clarinet), Harald Lassen (tenor and soprano saxophones), Kristoffer Eikrem (trumpet), David Aleksander Sjølie (guitar), Kjetil Jerve (piano), Bjørnar Kaldefoss Tveite (bass), Andreas Wildhagen (drums). In 2012 she performed within the band «Play Tell» including saxophonist Harald Lassen, pianist Eyolf Dale, bassist Mats Eilertsen and her father drummer Jon Christensen at the Norwegian national jazz scene «Victoria» in Oslo.

== Discography ==
- Say And Play (ECM Records, 2011), with Jon Balke's Batagraf
