= Brigaden =

Norwegian drama TV series

- Genre: Drama; Firefighting
- Created by: Ivar Køhn
- Written by: Ivar Køhn; Siv Rajendram; Bror Hageman; Pelone Wahl; Birgitte Bratseth; Peter Eisenstein
- Directed by: Erik Poppe; Berit Nesheim; Christian Brym; Tor Tørstad
- Country of origin: Norway
- Original language: Norwegian
- No. of seasons: 1
- No. of episodes: 26

Production
- Running time: 60 min

Original release
- Network: NRK
- Release: November 10, 2002 – May 18, 2003

Brigaden (The fire brigade) was a Norwegian drama series about firefighters.

== Plot ==
This series follows a group of firefighters in Norway. The show has been described as an intense and realistic story about a group of people who save lives. The episodes follow their professional lives as firefighters and their personal lives as their tough job takes a toll on their relationships.

== Cast ==
Actor	Role
Håkon Ramstad	Trond Corneliussen
Ines Prange	Connie Steen
Anders Mordal	Herman Henriksen
Duc Paul Mai-The	Oddvar Strømme
Hallvard Holmen	Per Hansmark
Åsmund-Brede Eike	Bernt Hagen
Erik Kirkman	Erik Markhus
Line Verndal	Andrea Seierstad
Gerald Pettersen	Morten Langeland
Sajid Malik	Ivar Malik
John Sigurd Kristensen	Olav J. Tønder
Even Stormoen	Torstein
Paul Ottar Haga	Johannes
