= Jon Knudsen =

Norwegian football coach (born 1974)

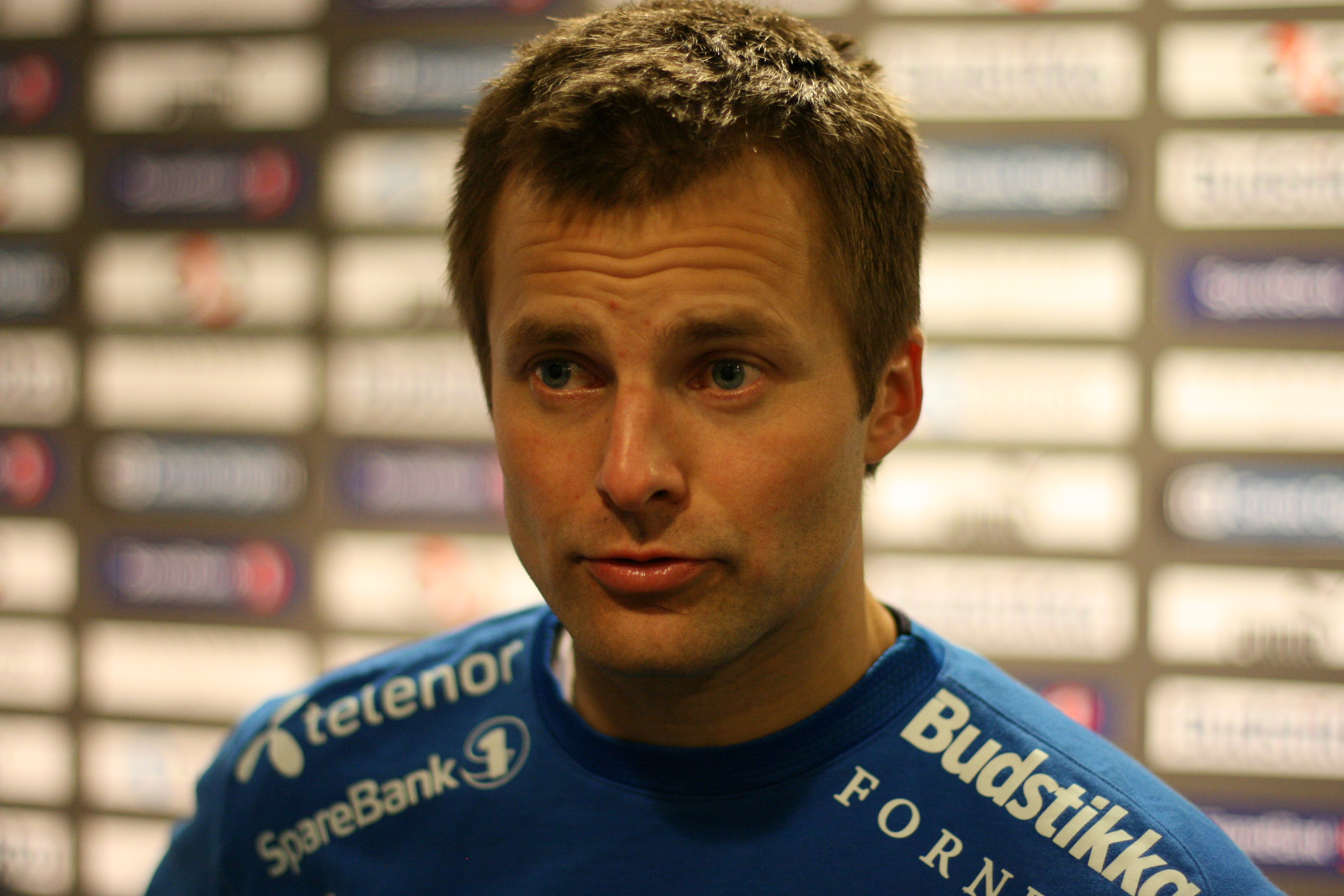

Personal information
- Date of birth: 20 November 1974 (age 51)
- Place of birth: Skedsmo, Norway
- Height: 1.85 m (6 ft 1 in)
- Position: Goalkeeper

Youth career
- Leirsund
- Lillestrøm

Senior career*
Years	Team	Apps	(Gls)
1993–1999	Lillestrøm	6	(0)
1996	→ Strømsgodset (loan)	7	(0)
1997	→ Skjetten (loan)		
1998	→ Kongsvinger (loan)	0	(0)
1999–2000	FC Midtjylland	14	(0)
2000–2012	Stabæk	285	(0)
2012	Fredrikstad	16	(0)
2013	Lillestrøm	0	(0)
Total		342	(0)

International career
1994	Norway U-21	2	(0)
2008–2011	Norway	20	(0)
- * Club domestic league appearances and goals

Jon Knudsen (born 20 November 1974) is a Norwegian former footballer who played as a goalkeeper. He is from August 2022, the goalkeeping coach for the Norway women's national team.

Knudsen spent most of his playing career with Stabæk, where he won the league in 2008, and has also played for Lillestrøm, Strømsgodset, Skjetten, Kongsvinger, FC Midtjylland and Fredrikstad. Knudsen was the first-choice goalkeeper for the Norway national team between 2008 and 2011 and was capped 20 times.

== Club career ==
Knudsen started his career with youth football in his native Leirsund. He was discovered by the local club Lillestrøm, a Tippeligaen team, and represented Norway internationally on youth level, including at the 1993 FIFA World Youth Championship. In 1993, he was on a fruitless trial with AFC Ajax. The same year he was included in the first squad of Lillestrøm as a reserve for Norway international Frode Grodås. In a Lillestrøm match against Ham Kam in June 1993, Grodås was injured before half time, and Knudsen made his senior debut. At the time Grodås was injured Ham Kam was behind 0–2, but they eventually won 4–3 after four goals by Petter Belsvik. However, in the next game Lillestrøm defeated Molde 3–0. After four games Grodås returned from injury.

Seeing limited playing time, Knudsen was sent on loan to Strømsgodset. Here, Knudsen suffered from a broken leg sustained in a match against Stabæk, where he collided with a teammate. Knudsen spent thirteen months away from football. He then spent time on loan to Skjetten and Kongsvinger. He left Norway in 1999 for Danish team Ikast FS, which in the same year was merged to form FC Midtjylland. Already in January 2000 he left FC Midtjylland, after conceding eight goals in fifteen matches, for Stabæk in Norway, as a replacement for Frode Olsen.

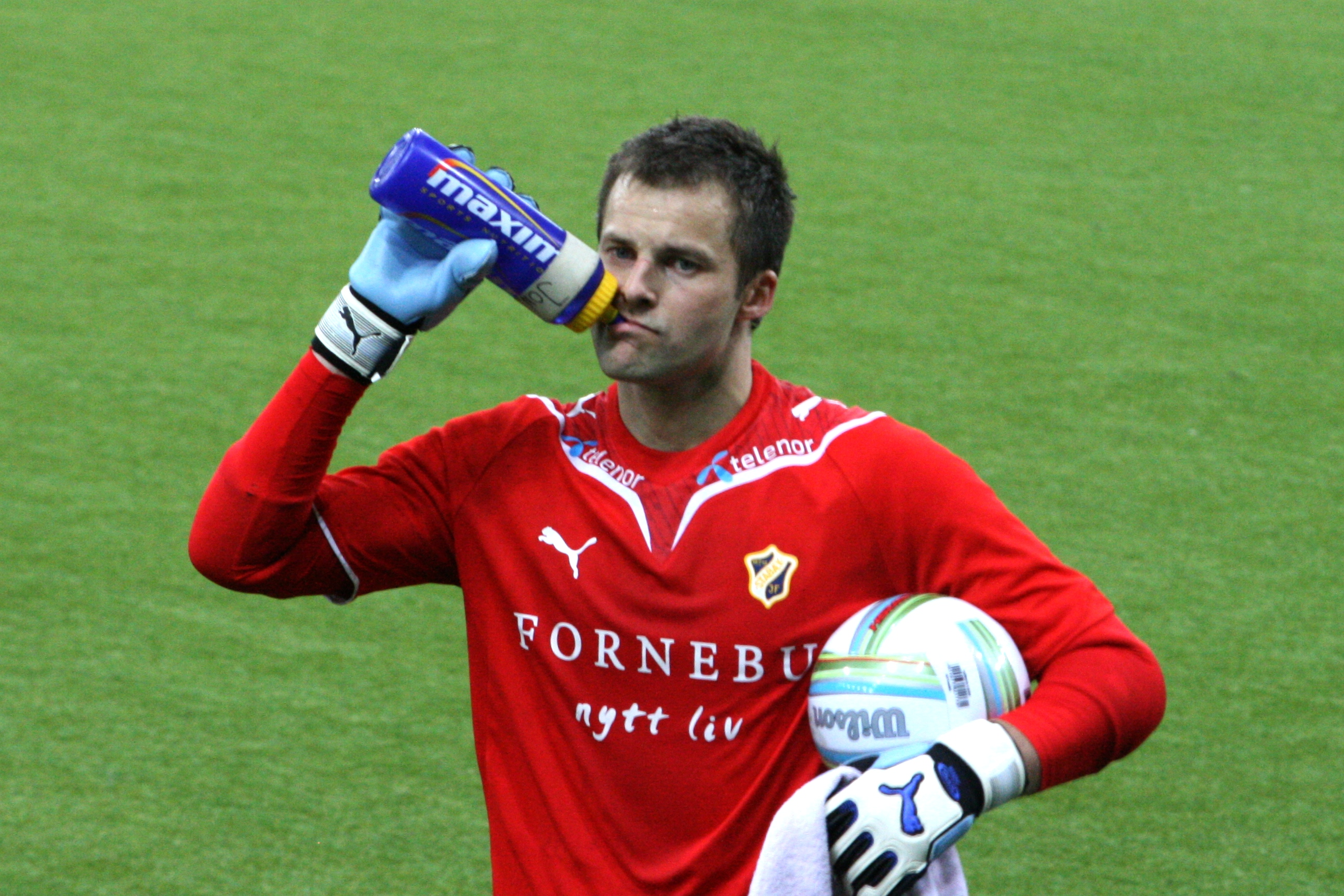
Knudsen while playing for Stabæk.

Knudsen quickly established himself in Stabæk's first team, being ever-present during the 2000 season. However, he missed most of the 2001 season due to epilepsy, after an epileptic attack in June. He returned to play 24 league games in 2002 and 21 league games in 2003, out of a total 26. He was unable to prevent Stabæk's relegation at the end of 2004. On the final day of that season he played a key part in Rosenborg winning the title over Vålerenga; with Vålerenga needing one more goal against Stabæk to win the title Morten Berre was through on goal in the last minutes, but Knudsen saved and Rosenborg won the title. Between 2004 and 2007 Knudsen played every league game for Stabæk.

Knudsen was injured at the start of the 2011 season, and Jan Kjell Larsen played every match when Knudsen were injured. He returned in Stabæk's starting line-up in the match against Tromsø on 26 June 2011. Knudsen made a bad performance against Odd Grenland and head coach Jörgen Lennartson chose Larsen as goalkeeper against Strømsgodset on 24 September. Larsen continued as first-choice goalkeeper to the end of the season, but Knudsen played the last match of the season against Vålerenga, but he was substituted after 53 minutes following his own request to leave the pitch. Knudsen played 11 league matches for Stabæk in 2012.

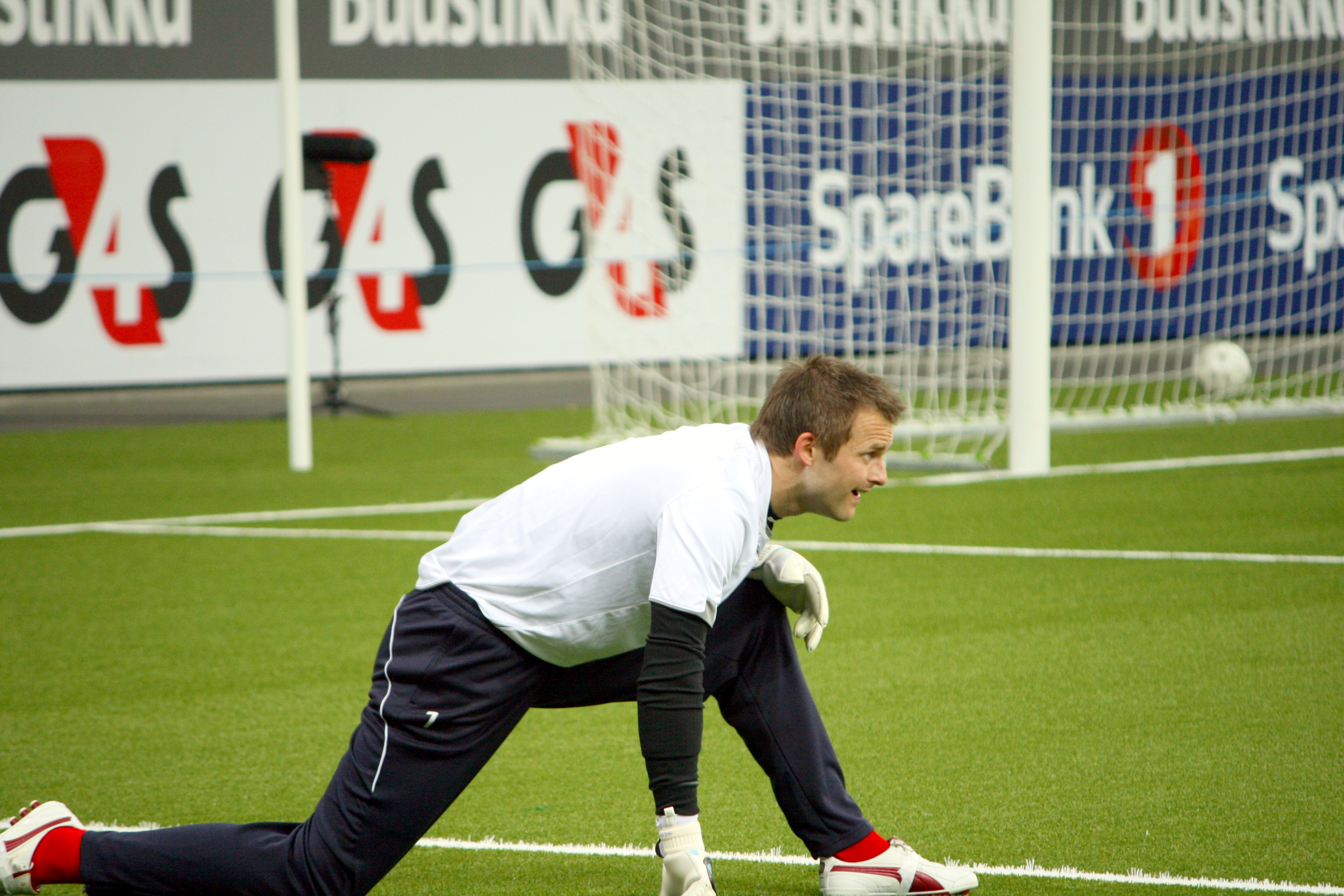
Knudsen warming up before a match.

Stabæk wanted to release Knudsen along with five other players from their contracts due to poor economy, which was also the reason why Knudsen did not want to finish the match against Vålerenga. After the season, Knudsen signed a two-year contract with the Tippeligaen side Fredrikstad. After playing the twelve first matches for Fredrikstad in the 2012 season, Knudsen lost the position as the first-choice goalkeeper to Jon Masalin. In October 2012, Knudsen announced that he would retire at the end of the season. After his retirement, Knudsen was approached by his old club Lillestrøm in May 2013 who had both their goalkeepers, Kenneth Udjus and Arnold Origi unavailable due to injuries, and had to play with the youth goalkeeper Jacob Faye-Lund. Knudsen signed an amateur-contract with Lillestrøm till the end of June 2013, and kept a clean sheet in his first match for Lillestrøm in 18 years, when the team won 2–0 against Bryne in the third round of the 2013 Norwegian Football Cup.

== International career ==
Knudsen was included in the national team squad for the first time in 2007, for a UEFA Euro 2008 qualifying match against Malta. His next call-up came in the autumn of 2008 for a friendly match against Ireland.

He made his international debut for Norway on 11 October 2008 in a 0–0 draw against Scotland. Keeping a clean sheet, he received praise for his play. National team manager Åge Hareide was "impressed", although he was uncertain whether Knudsen would keep his first-team place on a long-term view. Knudsen did retain his position as Norway first-choice goalkeeper for three years, until Knudsen got a fracture in his finger during training in March 2011, and lost the position as first-choice goalkeeper to Rune Jarstein. Knudsen's last international match was the friendly match against Poland in February 2011, and in total he was capped 20 times.

== Personal life ==
Jon Knudsen lives at Høybråten in Oslo with his wife and children. His son, Magnus, is also a professional footballer. His sister Mari Knudsen also played international football for Norway, while his brother Atle Knudsen is a film and television director. After he stepped down from professional football in 2012 he was employed as a goalkeeper coach at the Norwegian College of Elite Sport.

== Career statistics ==
As of 19 June 2013

Season	Club	Division	League		Cup		Total	
Season	Club	Division	Apps	Goals	Apps	Goals	Apps	Goals
2000	Stabæk	Tippeligaen	27	0	0	0	27	0
2001	Stabæk	Tippeligaen	10	0	1	0	11	0
2002	Stabæk	Tippeligaen	24	0	5	0	29	0
2003	Stabæk	Tippeligaen	21	0	3	0	24	0
2004	Stabæk	Tippeligaen	26	0	6	0	32	0
2005	Stabæk	Adeccoligaen	30	0	5	0	35	0
2006	Stabæk	Tippeligaen	26	0	3	0	29	0
2007	Stabæk	Tippeligaen	26	0	6	0	32	0
2008	Stabæk	Tippeligaen	25	0	5	0	30	0
2009	Stabæk	Tippeligaen	30	0	3	0	33	0
2010	Stabæk	Tippeligaen	29	0	3	0	32	0
2011	Stabæk	Tippeligaen	11	0	1	0	12	0
2012	Fredrikstad	Tippeligaen	16	0	0	0	16	0
2013	Lillestrøm	Tippeligaen	0	0	2	0	2	0
Career total			301	0	43	0	344	0
