= Mari Knudsen =

Norwegian football player (born 1984)

Personal information
- Full name: Mari Karoline Knudsen
- Date of birth: 17 February 1984 (age 42)
- Place of birth: Norway
- Position: Midfielder

Senior career*
| Years | Team | Apps | (Gls) |
| 2000–2008 | Skjetten SK | | |
| 2008–2015 | LSK Kvinner FK | 69 | (15) |

International career
| 2010–2011 | Norway U17 | 11 | (2) |
| 2012–2014 | Norway | 7 | (1) |
- * Club domestic league appearances and goals

Mari Karoline Knudsen (born 17 February 1984) is a Norwegian former international footballer who played at club level for LSK Kvinner FK of the Norwegian Toppserien.

== Club career ==
Knudsen signed for Toppserien club Team Strømmen in 2008, after spending a decade with Skjetten SK. She made an immediate impact with a goal against SK Trondheims-Ørn and was praised by assistant coach Monica Knudsen (no relation) for her ability to play in midfield or attack. In her first season with her new club, Knudsen played in the Norwegian Women's Cup final. This emulated her older brother Jon Knudsen who played in the 2008 Norwegian Football Cup Final for Stabæk Fotball. She was unable to match Jon's winner's medal as Strømmen lost 3–1 to Røa IL.

Knudsen remained with the club after it was taken over by Lillestrøm SK and became LSK Kvinner FK in 2010. She contributed to the team's 2012 Toppserien title win, describing it as "a dream come true".

== International career ==
In June 2012, Knudsen made her senior international debut for Norway against Bulgaria. She scored a goal in Norway's 11–0 UEFA Women's Euro 2013 qualifying win in Sarpsborg.

== Personal life ==
Knudsen's brother Jon also played football for Norway at international level, as a goalkeeper. Her other brother Atle is a film director.
