= Velvet Belly =

Norwegian pop band

- Origin: Kristiansand, Norway
- Genres: Pop
- Years active: 1989–present
- Labels: BMG (1994–present)
- Members: Kay Rune Rasmussen; Tor Henning Leh; Pål Aanensen; Anne Marie Almedal; Vidar Ersfjord

Velvet Belly is a Norwegian pop band from Kristiansand.

== Biography ==
The band started as a trio in 1989, and was joined by vocalist Anne Marie Almedal the following year. Her vocal was wrapped in a vague and melancholy soundscape dominated by synthesizers, programming and sampling to the band's regular producer Erik Honoré. They released two albums before they got a better reception with their third album Window Tree in 1994. The album landed them a contract with BMG which re-released the album with a new cover with Europe as a market.

Vidar Ersfjord, playing the keyboard joined the band for the album Lucia which was released in 1997, this album was awarded the Norwegian Spellemannprisen in the category for best pop group. The band has cooperated with the musician and songwriter Erik Honoré, and he has been the producer for all their albums.

== Honors ==
- 1997: Spellemannprisen in the category Pop band for the album Lucia

== Band members ==
- Kay Rune Rasmussen drums, piano
- Tor Henning Leh guitar
- Pål Aanensen bass-guitar, piano
- Anne Marie Almedal vocals
- Vidar Ersfjord keyboard

== Discography ==
- Colours (dBut, 1992) (released again with new cover by BMG in 1995)
- Little Lies (dBut, 1993)
- Window Tree (dBut, 1994, and a new release on BMG, 1995)
- The Landing (BMG, 1996)
- Lucia (BMG, 1997) (European and Japanese releases, with different cover art; Japanese release includes The Man With the Child in His Eyes, a cover of the Kate Bush song)
- Velvet Belly (Playground, 2003) double-album

Awards
Preceded by Bel Canto	Recipient of the Pop Band Spellemannprisen; 1997	Succeeded by D'Sound
