= Himmelblå =

Norwegian drama television series

- Country of origin: Norway
- No. of seasons: 3 (season 1: 2008, season 2: 2009, season 3: 2010)
- No. of episodes: 24

Production
- Running time: 45 min

Original release
- Network: NRK1
- Release: 7 September 2008 – 25 April 2010

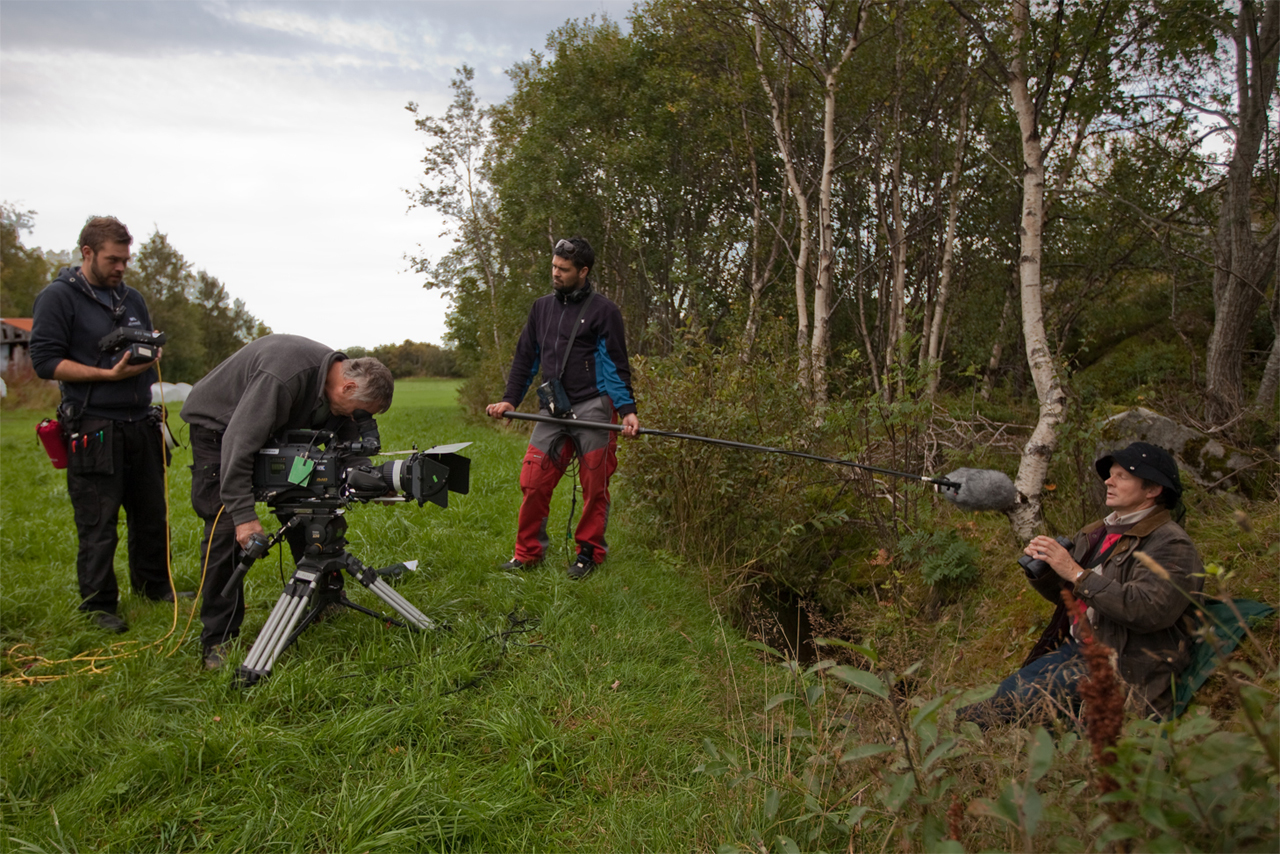

Himmelblå (in English: Blue sky) was a Norwegian drama series that aired on NRK1 in Norway, on SVT in Sweden and on RÚV in Iceland. It is based on the British TV drama Two Thousand Acres of Sky written by Timothy Prager and produced by Adrian Bate.

== Synopsis ==
Himmelblå is about a small community on Ylvingen, a remote island in northern Norway. The island's future is uncertain because the small school on the island will close unless they can find two additional pupils. The islanders place an advertisement in a national newspaper, promoting a family with two children old enough to join the school and promoting a job in the tourism industry if the family chooses to live on the island.

Marit (Line Verndal), a single mother living in Oslo, works late-nights as a chef and feels that she doesn't see her children often enough. Her best friend, Kim (Edward Schultheiss), helps her by looking after her children, Robin and Iris, while she is at work. When Kim shows Marit the advertisement, she sees an opportunity to start fresh and run her bed-and-breakfast on the island. Because the ad seeks a family to move to the island, Kim poses as Marit's "husband". After an interview, they receive an offer to stay on the island. The transition from urban life is challenging for the family, And their arrival is also a big change for the islanders.

== Popularity ==
The first two seasons were filmed back-to-back in 168 days in 2007–2008. The show premiered on 7 September 2008, becoming an instant hit and averaging more than 1 million viewers. A few months later, it returned for a second season, whose finale was viewed by 1,309,000 viewers, making it the most-watched drama series in Norwegian television history. The third and final season finished filming in September 2009 and began airing on 7 March 2010. The final episode aired on 25 April 2010.

== Cast ==
Actors	Roles		Season
Line Verndal	Marit	Single mum, runs a bed-and-breakfast	1–2–3
Edward Schultheiss	Kim	Marit's best friend and "husband"	1–2–3
Elvira Haaland	Iris	Marit's daughter	1–2–3
Sebastian Warholm	Robin	Marit's son	1–2–3
Ketil Høegh	Brynjar	Shopowner	1–2–3
Guri Johnson	Liv	Brynjar's ex-wife	1
Ingrid Vollan	Britt	Brynjar's wife	1–2–3
Lena Kristin Ellingsen	Karoline	Liv and Brynjar's daughter	1–2–3
Hallvard Holmen	Roy Harry Hansen	Boatowner	1–2–3
Terje Skonseng Naudeer	Roland	Vivian's brother	1–2–3
Nina Bendiksen	Vivian	Roland's sister and priest	1–2–3
Mathias Calmeyer	Jens	Vivian's husband	1
Uncredited	Lille-Jens	Vivian and Jens' son	1–2–3
Gunnar Søla	Amund	Vivian and Roland's father	1
Sigmund Sæverud	Johan	Ingeborg's husband	1–2–3
Julie Øksnes	Ingeborg	Johan's wife	1–2
John Sigurd Kristensen	Halle	Johan and Ingeborg's son	1–2–3
Zita Djenes	Klara	Halle's housekeeper from Romania	1–2–3
Eirik Evjen	Kristoffer	Schoolphotographer	1–3
Iren Reppen	Monica	Roy's date	1–2
Marika Enstad	Rakel	Moves back to the island	2–3
Marianne Sand	Synnöve	Wants to move to the Island	2
