= Atle Knudsen =

Norwegian director and screenwriter

- Born: 1971 (age 53–54); Norway
- Occupation(s): Film director, television director, theater director, screenwriter
- Spouse: Vera Micaelsen
- Children: 3

Atle Knudsen (born 1971) is a Norwegian director and screenwriter.

He won the 2012 Gullruten Award in the professional category for Best Direction in a Drama Production for the NRK series Vaffelhjarte (Waffle Heart). Knudsen was married to journalist and writer Vera Micaelsen, with whom he has three daughters, she died from cancer in 2018. He created and directed the TV series Etterglød (Afterglow) in 2022, which was inspired by his wife’s illness. The series won several awards, including Best Series at Prix Europa in 2022, while Knudsen was nominated for Best Director at the Seoul International Drama Awards in 2023. He is also the brother of footballers Jon and Mari Knudsen.

== Filmography ==
- Scarab flies at dusk/ Tordyveln flyger i skymningen (2025)
- Afterglow/ Etterglød (2022)
- Kristiania magiske tivoliteater (2021)
- Bloodride (2020)
- På rektors kontor (2019)
- En får væra som en er (2019) (2. episoder)
- ZombieLars (2017)
- Kampen for tilværelsen (season 2, episode 6, 7 and 8) (2014)
- MK-X (2014) (season 2, episode 2, 7 and 8)
- Trio - Odins Gull (2013)
- Hjem (episode 3, 4, 7 and 8) (2012)
- Vaffelhjarte (2011)
- ORPS (2009)
- ORPS – The Movie (2009)
- Jul i Svingen (2006)
- Linus i Svingen (2004)
- Uhu! (2002)
