= Anne Marie Almedal =

Norwegian musician

- Born: 6 December 1971 (age 54); Kristiansand, Vest-Agder, Norway
- Genres: Pop; Electronic
- Occupation: Singer
- Instrument: Vocals
- Labels: +47; Warner Music
- Website: Official website

Anne Marie Almedal (born 6 December 1971 in Kristiansand, Norway) is a Norwegian musician. She was lead vocalist in the band Velvet Belly (1989–2003) and has since released five solo albums.

== Career ==
Almedal is a graduate of the Rhythmic music program at the Rotterdam Conservatory of Music. She studied Dutch language and culture at the University of Leiden and a foundation in Christianity studies at the University of Oslo. She currently works as managing director at AKKS Kristiansand, an idealistic music organisation working for equality and gender balance in the Norwegian music industry.

She is known to many as the composer and singer of the theme song for the TV series Himmelblå broadcast by NRK. In 2000, she married the musician and composer Nicholas Sillitoe and they currently live in Vågsbygd, Kristiansand together with their two children, Florian and Stella Marie.

== Discography ==
=== Studio albums ===
- The Siren and the Sage (2007)
- Blue Sky Blue (2010)
- Memory Lane (2012)
- Lightshadow (2018)
- We Dance Alone (2022)

=== Collaborations ===
Within Velvet Belly

- 1992: Colours (dBut, released again with new cover by BMG in 1995)
- 1993: Little Lies (dBut)
- 1994: Window Tree (dBut)
- 1995: Window Tree (BMG, new release with new record-company)
- 1996: The Landing (BMG)
- 1997: Lucia (BMG) (European and Japanese releases, with different covers; Japanese release includes The Man With the Child in His Eyes, a cover of the Kate Bush song)
- 2003: Velvet Belly (Playground) double-album

With Lars Saabye Christensen, Ole Henrik Giørtz, Anne Marie Giørtz, Kristin Kajander & Elin Rosseland

- 1999: Skrapjern Og Silke (Grappa Music)

With Jan Bang, Erik Honoré & Nils Chr. Moe-Repstad

- 2002: Going Nine Ways From Wednesday (Pan M Records)

With Green Carnation

- 2007: A Night Under the Dam – live DVD (Sublife Records)

== Film music ==
Himmelblå, for TV series Himmelblå at NRK.

Dirk Ohm
