= Norwegian Theatre Academy =

The Norwegian Theatre Academy is a department of the Østfold University College and is located in Fredrikstad, approximately 80 km from Oslo.

== The degree programmes in Theatre Arts ==
Norwegian Theatre Academy offers two different study programs leading to a bachelor's degree, in acting and scenography respectively.

=== Student exchange program ===
The Norwegian Theatre Academy participates in international exchange programs.

=== Entrance ===
Entrance for both scenographers and performing artists is by audition. Generally speaking the application deadline is in March with consequent auditions in May each year. The actual dates are published on the Academy's website.

The Norwegian Theatre Academy is exempted from the standard Norwegian university entrance requirements and acceptance is gained by assessment of artistic talent during audition, which means that anyone can apply. Because of the international profile there are no requirements for Norwegian language skills, though it is expected that non-Scandinavian students acquire an understanding of Norwegian during their course of studies. As it is a state funded institution successful candidates are not required to pay tuition fees.

== Research ==
Norwegian Theatre Academy participates in the recently established Program for Research Fellowships in the Arts - a parallel to academic PhD programs that is one of the first of its kind in Europe. The scheme enables artistic research and development work of a high quality and successful candidates are considered qualified for the academic post of Senior Lecturer/Associate Professor. Candidates who have completed their arts education at the highest available level (normally MA) are given the opportunity for a three-year funded fellowship. Fellows are attached to one of the Norwegian educational institutions offering higher education in one or more of the creative and performing arts. The Norwegian Theatre Academy has hosted one of the first candidates to complete this program.

== Leadership ==
Norwegian Theatre Academy is organized with a joint leadership - artistic and administrative. Since August 2011 the artistic leadership is shared between Serge von Arx and Karmenlara Ely. T

Artistic Director - Scenography: Serge von Arx
Serge von Arx is a Swiss architect and designer based in Oslo and Berlin. During his extensive collaboration with Robert Wilson he developed and realized numerous stage-, exhibition- and installation-designs all over the world, while also creating various exhibitions as an independent designer. Serge writes as an architectural critic for the Neue Zürcher Zeitung and has a teaching experience from the Watermill Center on Long Island and the University of Barcelona.

Artistic Director - Acting: Karmenlara Ely
Dr. Karmenlara Ely has a Phd in Performance Studies at New York University. Before coming to NTA, Karmenlara spent nearly 10 years teaching theater and performance theory at New York University’s Tisch School of the Arts, with a special emphasis on exploring the impact of ethical philosophy and erotics on contemporary acting technique. She also held the position Artistic Director of the Tisch New York Summer Drama Intensive, 2008-2011. Karmenlara has collaborated as a performer, dramaturg and scenic costumer on theater, performance works and installations in the New York area since 1996, performing in spaces such as La Mama E.T.C., HERE Art Center, Galapagos Art Space, and The Public Theater. She has published in the journals Women in Performance and Performance Research among other sites.

The Artistic Council

- Kelly Copper and Pavol Liska
- Meg Stuart
- Robert Wilson

== Visiting guest teachers and lecturers ==
- Rajesh K. Mehta, Hybrid Trumpeter/Composer (US)
- Baktruppen, performance group (NO)
- Lukas Bangerter, director (CH)
- Claire Bishop, art historian (UK)
- Michael Laub, director (BE)
- Andreas Morell, film director (D)
- Ann Christin Rommen, director (D)
- Milan Peschel, actor/director (D)
- Jay Scheib, director (US)
- Ong Keng Sen, director (SP)
- AJ Weissbard, light designer (US)
- Linda Wise, director (UK/F)
