= Tine Asmundsen =

Norwegian jazz bassist

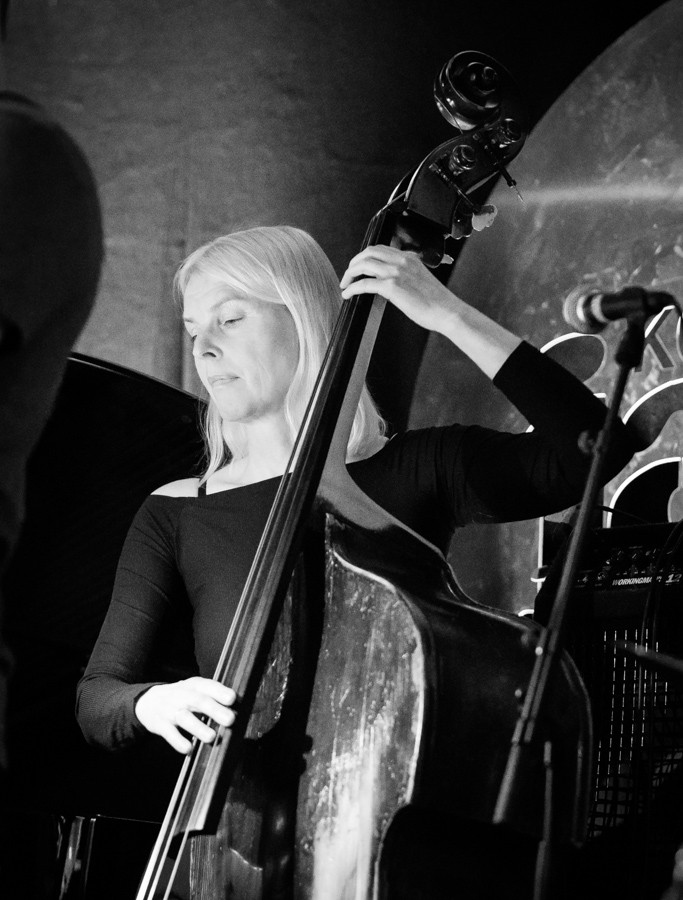
- In 2017

Background information
- Born: 8 April 1963 (age 63); Kongsberg, Buskerud, Norway
- Genres: Jazz
- Instrument: Upright bass
- Label: Hazel Jazz
- Member of: Lonely Woman
- Website: www.flagstad-festival.no/Norsk/Artistene/Tine-Asmundsen

Tine Asmundsen (born 8 April 1963) is a Norwegian jazz bassist, known from her own band, Lonely Woman, playing with David Murray at Kongsberg Jazzfestival 2010.

== Career ==
Asmundsen was born in Kongsberg, Norway. She started playing bass in Kongsberg, with the «Kongsberg Storband» at «Kongsberg Jazzfestival», educated at the «Østnorsk Musikkonservatorium» and University of Wisconsin, Madison, Wisconsin, among others under Richard Davis. In Oslo she was part of «Jazz Police» (1990). For a period she was in the band «Alibi» where also Maria Kannegaard played piano. She was within the band «Girl Talk» with Bodil Niska and Elizabeth Walker, releasing the album Talkin' Jazz (1996). Lately (2007–12) she has played within the band of Einar «Pastor´n» Iversen.

In 2000 she established her own record label «Hazel Jazz», and initiated the Quintet «Lonely Woman» in 2002, with four records (2012). Asmundsen was part of a string ensemble from 2006, playing Jon Balke compositions, with the pianist Kenneth Karlsson, Lise Strandli Pedersen (violin), Vladimir Stoyanov (violin), Renata Norcia (viola) and Tanja Orning (cello).

== Discography ==
=== Solo projects ===
Within «Lonely Woman»

- 2003: aLive (Hazel Jazz - HJ2), her own compositions, with Svein Christiansen (drums), Rune Klakegg/Jørn Øien (piano)
- 2005: Demon's Diversions (Hazel Jazz - HJ3), music by Vidar Johansen
- 2008: Radegund (Hazel Jazz - HJ6)
- 2012: Lovely Luna (Hazel Jazz - HJ7)

=== Collaborative works ===
- 1996: Talkin' Jazz (Ponca Jazz), «Girl Talk» with Bodil Niska and Elizabeth Walker
- 2000: Seaview (Hazel Jazz HJ1), with Einar Iversen (piano), Svein Christiansen (drums), Vidar Johansen (saxophone) and Roy Nikolaisen (trumpet)
- 2007: About time (Hazel Jazz HJ4), with Lill Holen, Einar Iversen and Svein Christiansen
- 2008: Madison (Hazel Jazz HJ5), with Richard Davis (double bass), Vidar Johansen (tenor saxophone, flute, bass clarinet) and Robert Shy (drums)
