= Anne-Marie Giørtz =

Norwegian vocalist and orchestra conductor

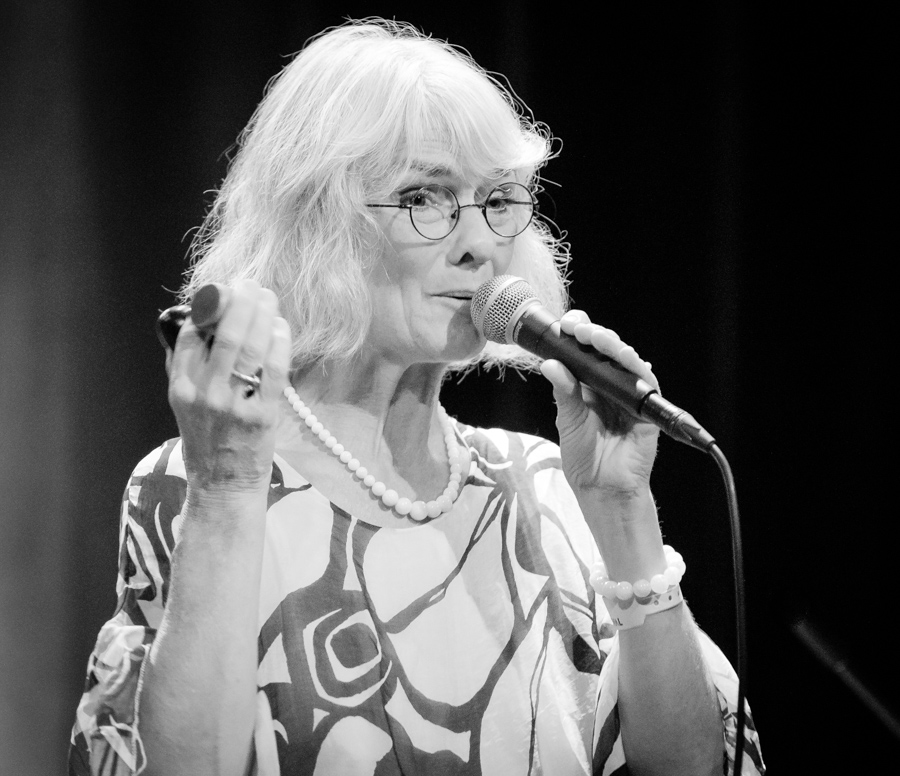
- Anne Marie Giørtz performing in 2018

Background information
- Born: 19 March 1958 (age 68); Stockholm, Sweden
- Genres: Jazz
- Occupations: Musician, composer
- Instruments: Vocals, piano, trumpet, saxophone
- Website: Official website

Anne-Marie Giørtz (born 19 March 1958) is a Norwegian vocalist, orchestra conductor, singing teacher in the genre jazz, and married to the Norwegian guitarist Eivind Aarset. She has performed and recorded with various bands.

== Career ==
Giørtz started her career as trumpeter in Lysaker school marching band, studied piano and saxophone at University of Oslo (1976–80), and made herself marked at the Oslo jazz scene where she was part of the band "EIM" (1980–82), before she established her own Anne Marie Giørtz Kvintett (1982–86), together with her brother Ole Henrik Giørtz among others. The band continued in her band Ab und Zu. Other partners include "Radiostorbandet" and "Danmarks Radiostorband".

She was part of the Rock band Bazar initiated early 1970s by guitarist Rolf Aakervik in Oslo. Their first album Det er ikke enkelt (1973) had a clear, politically radical message, with lyrics that reflected the current fight against EEC, with a referendum in the autumn of 1972 in mind.

Giørtz is known as a front figure in the Trio de Janeiro (1988–), where together with Tom Steinar Lund she released two albums and was awarded Spellemannprisen 1993. With her brother Ole Henrik she composed the commission Den akustiske skyggen for Moldejazz (1993).

The trio including Kaia Huuse and Veslemøy Solberg in addition to Giørtz released 'Jenter fra Jante' (1999) performing lyrics by Aksel Sandemose. She is also contributing on 'Skrapjern og silke' (1999), based on stage performance with the texts of Lars Saabye Christensen and music composed by Ole Henrik Giørtz. Giørtz have recently graduated as a Qigong Instructor in Sweden.

== Honors ==
- Spellemannprisen 1993

== Discography ==
=== Solo albums ===
- 1983: Breaking Out (Odin Records)
- 1985: Tigers Of Pain (Odin Records), AMG band
- 2009: På Egne Vegne (Grappa Music)
- 2016: Capital Punishment For Cars (Grappa Music)

=== Collaborative works ===
Within Bazar
1973: Det er ikke enkelt (Samspill)
1974: Drabantbyrock (Mai)
Within Ab und Zu
1989: Ab Und Zu (Curling Legs)
1996: Totally (Curling Legs)
2002: Spark Of Life (Curling Legs)
With Lars Saabye Christensen, Ole Henrik Giørtz, Anne Marie Almedal, Kristin Kajander and Elin Rosseland
1999: Skrapjern Og Silke (Grappa Music)
With Kaia Huuse and Veslemøy Solberg
1999: Jenter Fra Jante (Nordicae Records)
With Claudio Latini
2006: Receita para a Vida (IPE Mundi Records)
