= Bjørnar Andresen =

Norwegian jazz musician (1945–2004)

- Genres: Jazz
- Occupations: Musician; composer; double bassist
- Instruments: Double bass; guitar; banjo

Bjørnar Andresen (1 April 1945 – 2 October 2004) was a Norwegian jazz musician (double bass, guitar, banjo), known for his improvisational and multicultural musical expression in a variety of publications.

== Career ==
Andresen established the free jazz band "Finnerud Trio" with his childhood friend Svein Finnerud (1967–74), inspired by material they had experienced on concert with Paul Bley and Kent Carter in "Universitetets Aula", as well as the George Russell seminars in jazz theory. He was on the album Min bul (1970) together with Terje Rypdal and Espen Rud, while he was active in Henie-Onstad Art Centre, where several of the performances took place.

In the 1980s, he released a self-titled album with fiddle player Nils Økland (1986), contributed on albums within "The Quintet" (1998–), with Jon Eberson and Paal Nilssen-Love on Mind the Gap (2004), as well as within Jon Klette's band "Jazzmob" on the album Pathfinder (2003). His last appearance in the spring of 2004, can be heard on the album Rock (2005) within Thomas Strønen's band "Bayashi". On the occasion of his tribute concert at the jazz club "Cosmopolite" in Oslo (2001) there was established a "Crimetime Orchestra" (2001), that Andresen led to posthumous release Life is a beautiful monster (2004). Paal Nilssen-Love/Ken Vandermark's album Seven (2006) recorded 1 April 2005 at the jazz club "Blå" in Oslo, was dedicated Andresen's 60'th birthday.

== Discography (in selection) ==
- 1971: Min Bul (EmArcy 2003), with Terje Rypdal & Espen Rud
- 1986: Nils Økland/Bjørnar Andresen (Hot Club Records)
- 2000: Egne Hoder (BP Records), with Svein Finnerud & Paal Nilssen-Love
- 2001: Egne HoderMind The Gap (Curling Legs), with Jon Eberson & Paal Nilssen-Love
- 2004: Life Is A Beautiful Monster (Jazzaway Records), with Crimetime Orchestra Feat. Bjørnar Andresen
- 2005: Rock (Jazzaway Records), with Thomas Strønen
