= Tander =

Tander may refer to:

== People ==
- Garth Tander (born 1977), Australian racing driver
- Leanne Tander (born 1980), Australian racing driver, wife of Garth
- Mina Tander (born 1979), German actress
- Simin Tander (born 1980), German singer

== Other uses ==
- Tander, the parent company of Magnit, Russia's largest food retailer.
