= Svein Olav Herstad =

Norwegian jazz pianist

- Born: 7 July 1969 (age 57); Odda Municipality, Hordaland, Norway
- Genres: Jazz
- Occupations: Musician, composer
- Instruments: Piano, keyboards
- Labels: Jazzaway; Ponca Jazz; Schmell
- Website: www.sveinolavherstad.no

Svein Olav Herstad (born 7 July 1969 in Odda Municipality, Norway) is a jazz pianist, known from his own bands and several recordings with musicians like Sonny Simmons, Jan Erik Kongshaug, Nils-Olav Johansen, Harald Johnsen, and Per Oddvar Johansen.

== Career ==
Herstad studied music at Musikkskolen in Haugesund, and is a graduate from the Jazz program at Trondheim Musikkonsevatorium, (1990–93). He started the band Svein Olav Herstad trio during his studies in Trondheim. With different lineups the band has released a series of albums, performing Herstad's own compositions. After moving to Oslo (1996–2001) he played within Jan Erik Kongshaug's quartet on two albums (1998, 2003). Living in Haugesund from 2001, he has been engaged with the festival Sildajazz, as well as being a part of the Christina Bjordal Band.

== Discography ==
=== Solo piano ===
- 2010: Free the Nightingale (Ponca Jazz)

=== Svein Olav Herstad Trio (including Magne Thormodsæter and Håkon Mjåset Johansen) ===
- 2006: Suite for Simmons (Jazzaway), featuring Sonny Simmons live from Festiviteten Hall, Sildajazz in Haugesund (2005), performing a commission in six parts
- 2007: Inventio (Jazzaway Records)
- 2017: The Ballad Book (Curling Legs)

=== As leader ===
- 1993: Dig (Ponca Jazz), within a trio including Harald Johnsen and Torbjørn Engan
- 1997: Sommerregn (Ponca Jazz ), within a trio including Harald Johnsen and Per Oddvar Johansen

=== Collaborative works ===
Within Jan Erik Kongshaug trio including Harald Johnsen & Per Oddvar Johansen

- 1998: The Other World (ACT)
- 2003: All These Years (Hot Club)

Within Christina Bjordal Band

- 2003: Where Dreams Begin (EmArcy/Universal)

With Organ Jam

- 2013: Organics (Normann)

Awards
Preceded by Egil Kapstad	Recipient of the Sildajazzprisen; 2002	Succeeded by Dag Arnesen
