= Harald Johnsen =

Norwegian jazz musician

- Born: Harald Gill Johnsen; 19 March 1970; Oslo
- Origin: Norway
- Died: 24 July 2011 (aged 41) Oslo, Norway
- Genres: Jazz
- Occupations: Musician, composer
- Instrument: Upright bass

Harald Gill Johnsen (19 March 1970 – 24 July 2011) was a Norwegian jazz double bassist, known for his contributions in bands like Køhn/Johansen Sextet and Tord Gustavsen Trio, and a series of recordings with such as Sonny Simmons, Sigurd Køhn, Nils-Olav Johansen, Jan Erik Kongshaug, Frode Barth, Per Oddvar Johansen and Ditlef Eckhoff.

== Career ==
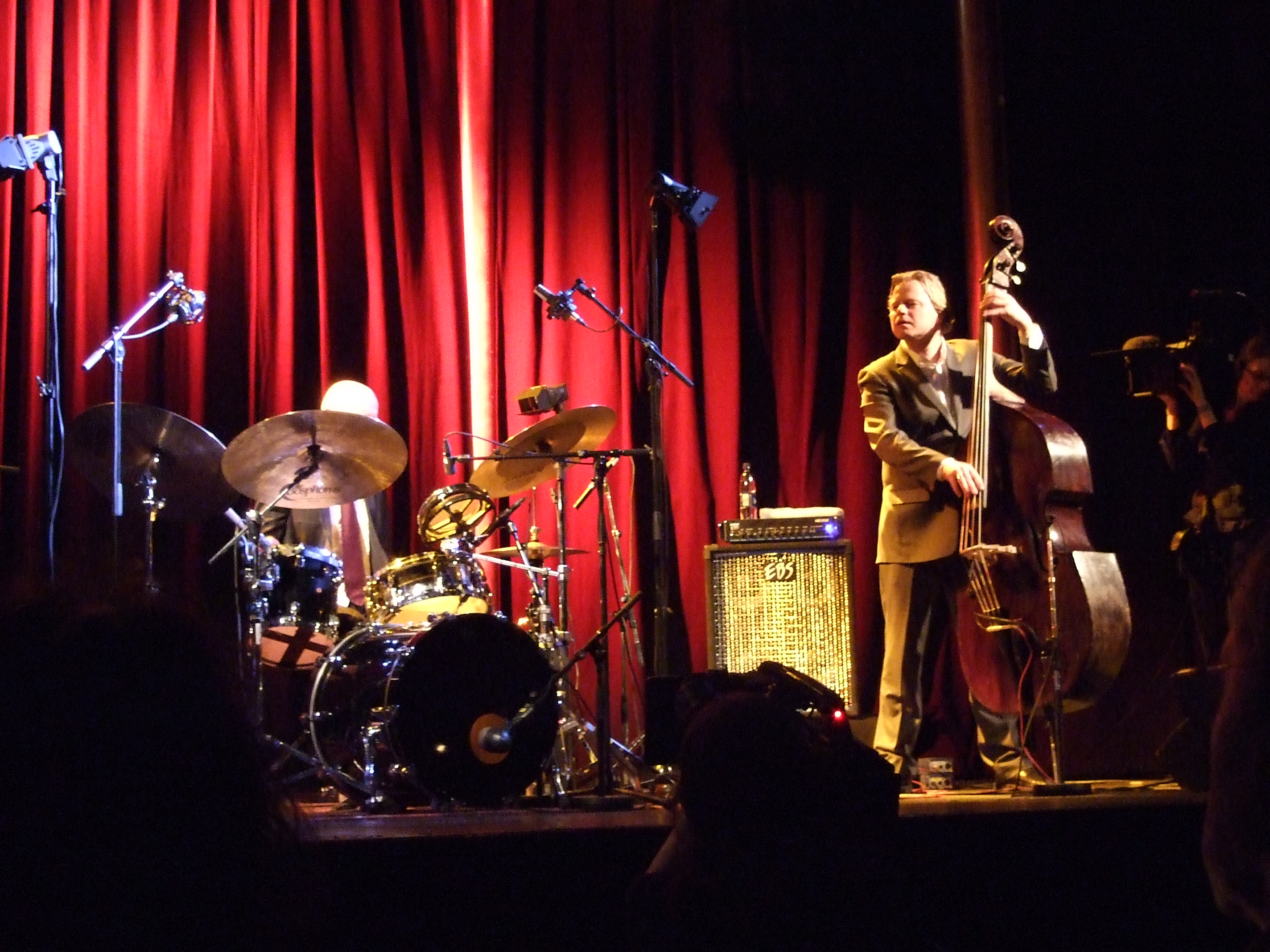
Harald Johnsen during a concert with Tord Gustavsen Trio in Oslo 2007. (Photo: Martin Stabenfeldt)

Johnsen was a graduate of the Jazz program at Trondheim Musikkonservatorium (NTNU, 1989–92). He participated in the "two basses event" with the Trygve Seim led Trondheim Art Orchestra later called Trygve Seim Ensemble. He played a key role in a variety of jazz bands, including Nils-Olav Johansen Trio, Christian Belt Trio, Svein Olav Herstad Trio, Jan Erik Kongshaug Quartet and Køhn/Johansen Sextet. He was a member of several bands, including Erlend Skomsvoll's "Hvorfor Ikke?" in 1994, Erik Wesseltoft Quartet from 1995, "Appaloosa Nova" from 1996, and collaborated on the album You'll always need friends (1997) within The Alf Kjellman Project, and Choice (1998) with Monica Borgen. He has also played a while with Ditlef Eckhoff, releasing an album Impressions of Antibes (1997). In the last years of his life he had great success in the Tord Gustavsen Trio.

Johnsen has participated on several recordings, such as with Ditlef Eckhoff and Eric Reed on the album Impressions of Antibes (1997), and on the Einar Iversen led album Merry Christmas (1999) by Ditlef Eckhoff. Around the turn of the millennium, he joined Silje Nergaard Band and Tord Gustavsen Trio, which led to international releases. In addition he has played on recordings with, among others Karl Sundby (2004).

Johnsen also played with guitarist and composer Frode Barth since 1984. Their trio TAPE (guitar, bass and drums) along with drummer Tom Erling Lie, won the Youth Festival, Norwegian final, in 1988. They also released the album, Blue Spheres (2007).

Johnsen got an illness that prevented him gradually from playing actively. He died on 24 July 2011 at the age of 41.

== Discography (in selection) ==
With Tord Gustavsen Trio

- 2002: Changing Places (ECM)
- 2004: The Ground (ECM)
- 2006: Being There (ECM)

With Svein Olav Herstad Trio
- 1993: Dig (Ponca Jazz Recordings), trio including Torbjørn Engan
- 1997: Sommerregn (Ponca Jazz Recordings), trio including Per Oddvar Johansen
- 2006: Suite for Simmons (Jazzaway), trio including Johnsen/Johansen feat. Sonny Simmons live from Festiviteten Hall, Sildajazz in Haugesund (2005), performing a commission in six parts
With Silje Nergaard Band
- 2000: Port of call (EmArcy)
- 2001: At first light (EmArcy)
- 2003: Nightwatch (EmArcy)

With Ditlef Eckhoff
1997
Impressions of Antibes (Gemini Records)
With The Alf Kjellman Project

- 1997: You'll Always Need Friends (Gemini Records)

With Monica Borgen

- 1998: Choice (Midnight Blue Music)

With Jan Erik Kongshaug

- 1998: The Other World (ACT)
- 2003: All These Years (Hot Club Records)

Within "Køhn/Johansen Sextet»

- 1999: Woman's Got to Have It
- 2003: Angels

With Einar Iversen & Ditlef Eckhoff

- 1999: Merry Christmas (Hi-Di Music)

With Erik Wesseltoft Quintet

- 2004: Con Amor (Normann Records)

With Trond Bjertnes & Frode Barth

- 1993: Egentlig (Ponca Jazz Records)
- 1997: JEG (MTG)
Duo with Frode Barth

- 2007: Blue spheres (MTG)

With other projects

- 1988: Hummer og kanari, Frode A. Danielsen
- 1996: Østkantblues, Karl Sundby / Erik Wesseltoft
- 1999: Together, Inge Stangvik / Eivind Sannes
