= Frode Barth =

Norwegian musician (born 1968)

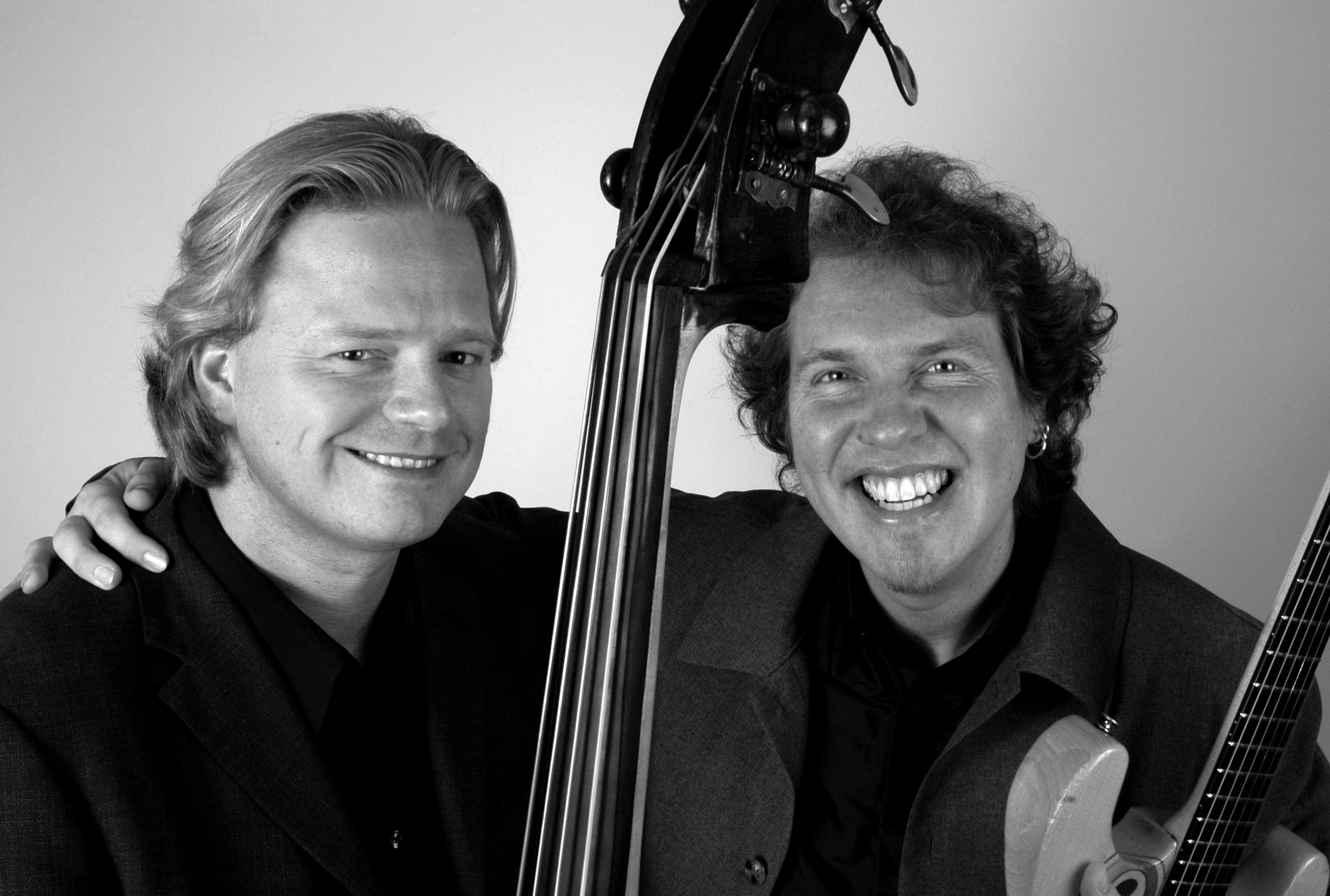
- Harald Johnsen and Frode Barth at photoshoot for their record Blue Spheres.

Background information
- Born: 20 August 1968 (age 58); Lørenskog, Akershus
- Origin: Norway
- Genres: Jazz, popular, contemporary music
- Occupations: Musician, composer, guitarist
- Instrument: Guitar
- Website: www.frodebarth.com

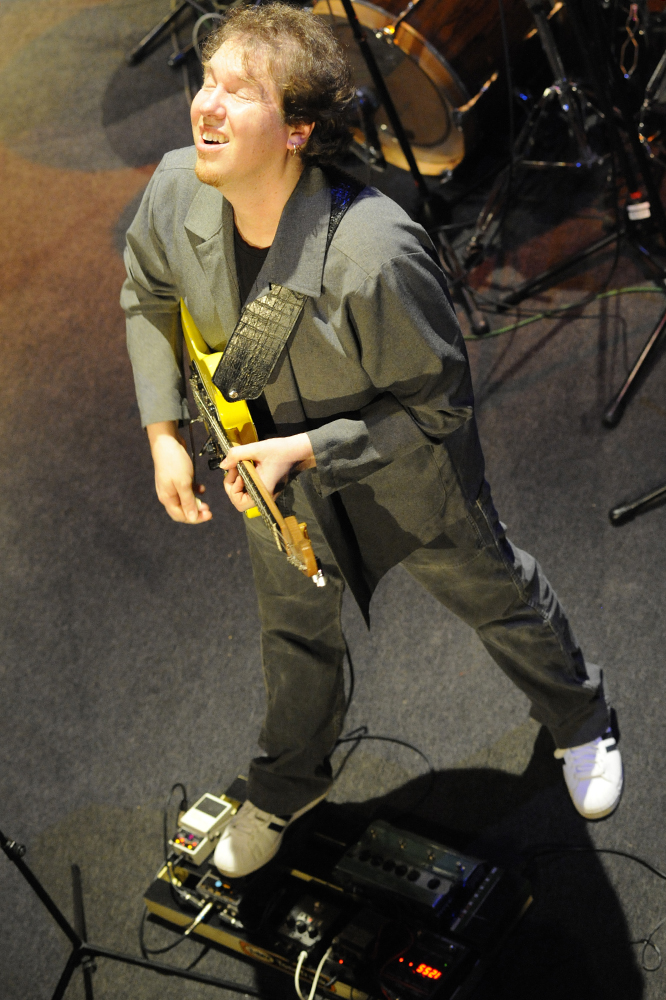
Norwegian-Polish project Nor Pol Bridge in concert at the Polish Radio studio in Warsaw, Poland - January 2011.

Frode Barth (born 20 August 1968) is a Norwegian musician (guitar) and composer, widely recognized for his contributions to jazz, contemporary and popular music, performing with musicians including Oscar Peterson, Reggie Workman, Arthur Maia, Robertinho Silva, Toninho Horta, Kjell Karlsen, Trygve Seim, Terje Venaas, Harald Johnsen, Celio de Carvalho, Alf Kjellman, Pål Thowsen, Arild Andersen, Jon Eberson, Per Oddvar Johansen, Steve Bloom and Jarle Vespestad.

== Career ==
Barth was born in Lørenskog and picked up the guitar at only 9 years of age. Under the tutorship of Erik Wesseltoft (1977–1984) he would soon progress to lead his own bands. One of the most prominent of them being "Bad Image", which was bestowed with a first place of the major Norwegian daily newspaper Aftenposten's talent competition in 1983. He was also involved in the "St. Laurentius Choir" (1977–1983) where he appeared as a soloist on a number of occasions. When 15 he filled in for Wesseltoft in the nationally renowned Kjell Karlsen Orchestra and showed his skills as soloist alongside lauded trumpeter Peter Katterås. He later studied under the guidance of guitarists Bjørn Klakegg (1983–1989), Jørn Takla (1985–1986), Egil Haugland (1984–87), Knut Værnes (during the Norwegian Jazz Federation Summer School in 1987), Odd-Arne Jacobsen (1988–1989), Staffan William-Olsson (1988–1990), Stein-Erik Olsen (1989–1991) and Geir-Otto Nilsson (1991–1992). In addition to the guitar studies, Barth also studied improvisation under the jazz musicians Torgrim Sollid and Morten Lassem (1986–1988).

Barth is a graduate of the Music program at Foss videregående skole (1985–1988), and completed the instrumental teaching course at the Barratt Due Institute of Music (1988–1990). This is a classic course, but he was also active in a wide range of musical experiences, like the improvisation classes taught by jazz pianist Egil Kapstad, occasionally bring in well established musicians such as drummer Ole Jacob Hansen and bassist Terje Venaas. Barth also studied with the well respected guitarist Finn Westbye. He continued studying guitar, composition and kindergarten music teaching at the Barratt-Due Institute of Music (1990–91) and began graduate studies at the Institute for Music and Theatre at the University of Oslo (1992–94). Following this period, Barth focused on studying with influential players in his chosen genre including in-depth studies in London with guitarist and composer John W. Duarte (1996), lessons with guitarist and composer Leo Brouwer in Havana (1999) and sessions with bassist and composer Reggie Workman, in New York 1994 and 1997.

Barth is now active as a guitarist, composer, educator and producer, and has collaborated with a wide range of musicians, and contributed to and released a number of albums, visited festivals in Norway and around the World, and participated in a number of TV and radio programmes. He received the National Scholarship as a musician in 1999 to work with composer Bjørn Fongaard's microtonal quarter-tone music. Of most importance for his career is the Norwegian-Estonian trio collaboration Barth, Aaserud & Roll [BAR], which with the release Going North was awarded the 2006 Estonian Grammy, in the category Jazz. Another important project is the long lasting collaboration with bassist Harald Johnsen. In 1988 they won the national finals of Norway's youth culture event UKM as members of trio TAPE, together. Barth has recently contributed to "Julius Winger Band" including Jan Erik Kongshaug (guitar), Mathias Eick (trumpet), Trygve Seim (saxophone), Mats Eilertsen (bass), Andreas Utnem (piano), Halvor Lillesund (accordion) and Per Oddvar Johansen (drums).

== Discography ==
Solo album

- 2009: Lines and Circle

Collaborative works

- 1989 Kvinner & Kanari (Hot Club)
- 1994 Egentlig (MTG), with Trond Bjertnes
- 1995 Gjær (MTG), Forfatterverket
- 1997 Cumulus – Norwegian Contemporary Guitar Music (MTG)
- 1997 Jeg (MTG), with Trond Bjertnes
- 1998 Beeples (MTG)
- 2002 Rull's Choice (RR1)
- 2005 Norec (SAZAS), with Aleš Hadalin & Marko Boh
- 2005 Eesti hääled (RR)
- 2006 Going North (MTG), Barth-Aaserud-Rull [BAR]
- 2007 Blue Spheres (MTG), with Harald Johnsen
- 2008 Kjærlighet og andre misforståelser (Kirkelig Kulturverksted), with Julius Winger
