= Tore Brunborg =

Norwegian jazz musician and composer (born 1960)

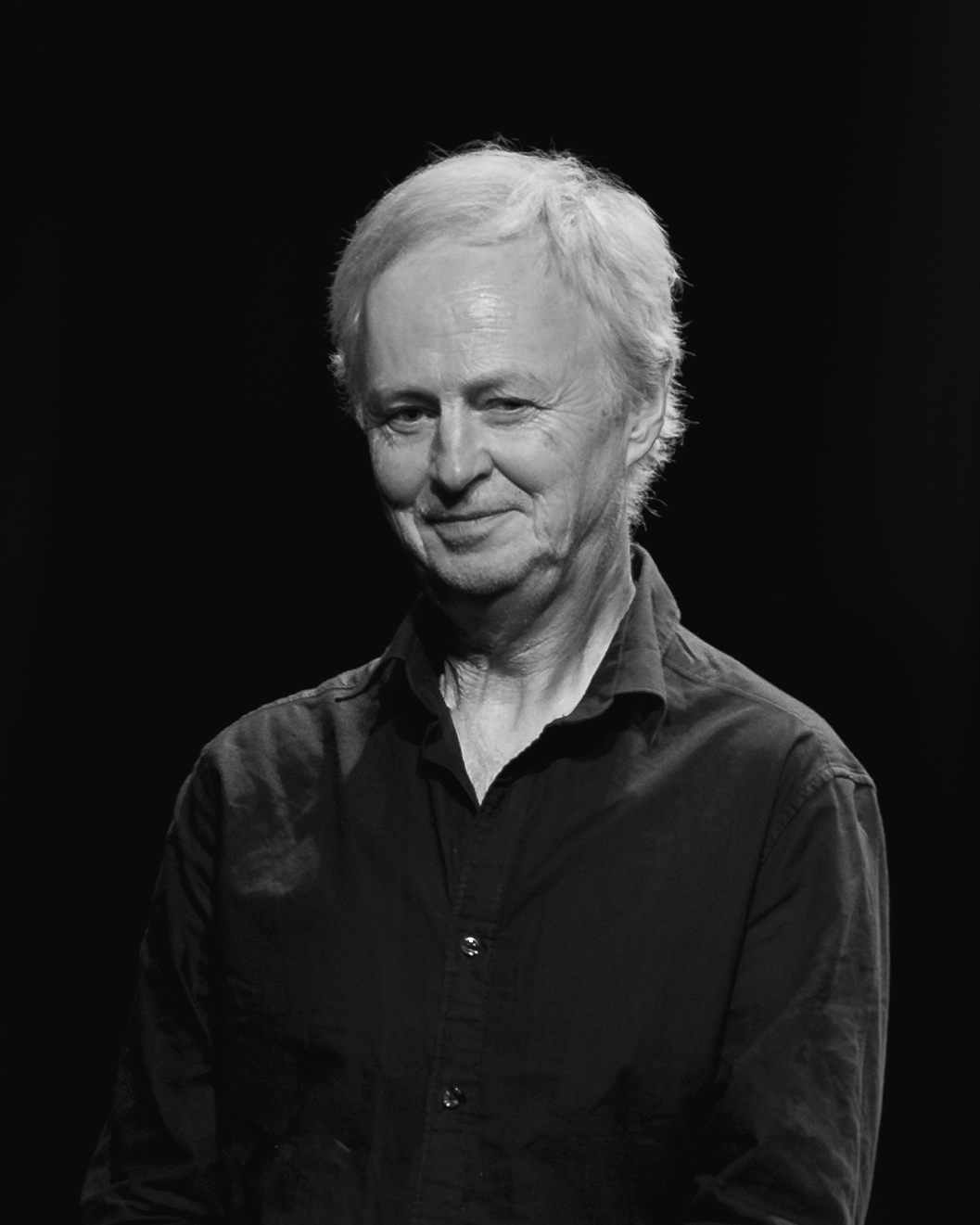
- Brunborg in 2026

Background information
- Born: 20 May 1960 (age 66); Trondheim, Sør-Trøndelag, Norway
- Genres: Jazz
- Occupation: Musician
- Instrument: Saxophone
- Website: torebrunborg.com

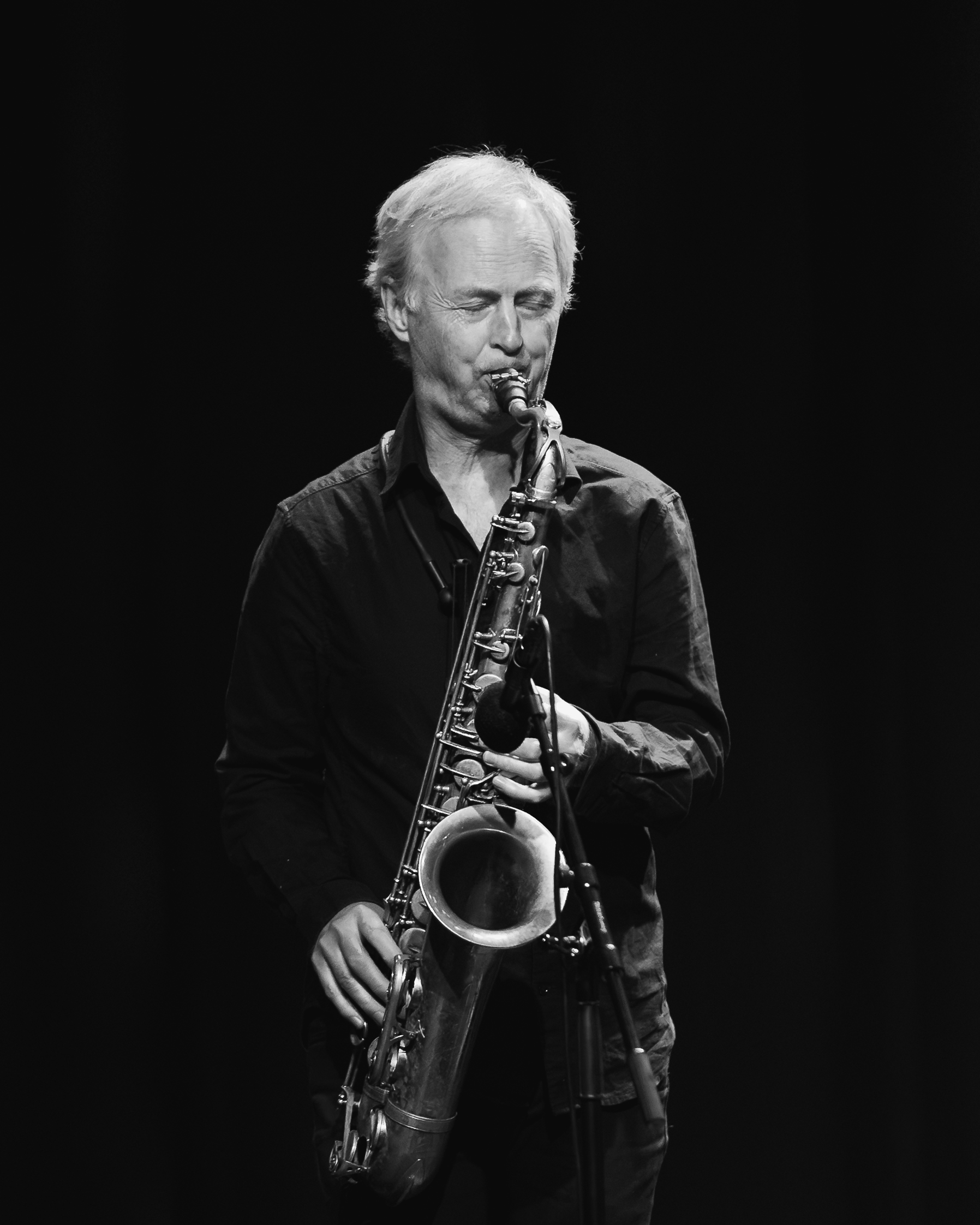
Brunborg performing in 2026

Tore Brunborg (born 20 May 1960) is a Norwegian jazz musician and composer who plays saxophone. He was born in Trondheim but grew up in Voss where a jazz environment was flowering. Known from numerous appearances with international greats including Bugge Wesseltoft, Håvard Wiik, Audun Kleive, Anders Jormin, Diederik Wissels, Arild Andersen, Pat Metheny, Per Jørgensen, Geir Lysne, Misha Alperin, Bjørn Alterhaug, Jan Gunnar Hoff, Jarle Vespestad, Jon Christensen, Jon Balke, Nils Petter Molvær, Vigleik Storaas, Bo Stief, and Billy Cobham.

== Career ==
After playing with Knut Kristiansen and Per Jørgensen, Brunborg debuted at Vossajazz (1980, 1982). After this he studied music at Toneheim folkehøgskole and on the Jazz program at Trondheim Musikkonservatorium (1980–82), and has evolved to be one of the most sought jazz saxophonists in Norway.

He was on the lineup for the acclaimed band Masqualero and was three times awarded Spellemannprisen with this band. Brunborg also was within Jon Eberson's Jazzpunkensemblet (two record releases). He performed with Pat Metheny at the Moldejazz (2001), and has appeared in a wide range of lineups with different jazz orchestras since. At the Norwegian Jazz scene he has been most recognized for the cooperation with Arild Andersen and his music for "Kristin Lavransdatter", performed to the Olympic Games at Lillehammer. He is a member of the Jazz quartet Moment together with Jørn Øien, Jens Fossum and Andreas Bye.

During the past few years he has worked with Mathias Eick, Manu Katché, the Tord Gustavsen Ensemble and Ketil Bjørnstad. He also plays a key role on three of Mats Eilertsen's records (Radio Yonder, Sky Dive and Hymn for Hope), and with the band Scent of Soil fronted by vocalist Kirsti Huke and Brunborg. On their first album, they make use of material from a critically acclaimed commissioned work they wrote together for the Vossajazz Festival in 2010.

== Awards and honors ==
- Spellemannprisen 1983 in the class jazz for the album Masqualero, with the band Masqualero
- Spellemannprisen 1986 in the class jazz for the album Bande a Part, with the band Masqualero
- Spellemannprisen 1991 in the class jazz for the album Re-enter, with the band Masqualero
- Vossajazzprisen 2013

== Discography ==
=== Solo albums ===
- 1993: Tid (Curling Legs), with Bugge Wesseltoft and Jon Christensen
- 1997: Prima Luna (Kirkelig Kulturverksted), with Kjetil Bjerkestrand
- 1998: Orbit (Curling Legs), with Jarle Vespestad
- 2003: Gravity (Vossa Jazz), with Bugge Wesseltoft, Lars Danielsson and Anders Engen
- 2009: Lucid Grey (Dravle)
- 2011: Scent of Soil (Hubro), with Kirsti Huke
- 2012: Extended Circle (ECM)
- 2015: Slow Snow (ACT)

=== Collaborations ===
Within Masqualero, including Nils Petter Molvær, Arild Andersen, Jon Christensen

- 1983: Masqualero (Odin), Jon Balke
- 1983: Bande À Part (ECM), with Jon Balke
- 1988: Aero (ECM), with Frode Alnæs
- 1991: Re-enter (ECM)

With others

- 1992: Night Caller [Label Bleu), with Rita Marcotulli, Michel Benita, Nils Petter Molvaer, Jon Christensen, Anders Kjellberg
- 1995: Gull, Røkelse Og Myrra (Kirkelig Kulturverksted), with Kjetil Bjerkestrand
- 1997: 'Mbara Boom (EmArcy), with Paolo Vinaccia, Arild Andersen, feat. Il Coro Di Neoneli
- 2009: Restored, Returned (ECM) within Tord Gustavsen ensemble
- 2010: Remembrance (ECM), with Ketil Bjørnstad
- 2011: Skala (ECM), with Mathias Eick
- 2012: The Well (ECM) within Tord Gustavsen Quartet
- 2014: Live in Concert (ACT), with Manu Katché
- 2015: Everblue (L&H), with Yelena Eckemoff feat. Arild Andersen, Jon Christensen

Awards
Preceded by Eldbjørg Raknes	Recipient of the Buddyprisen; 2012	Succeeded by Jan Gunnar Hoff
Preceded by Sigrid Moldestad	Recipient of the Vossajazzprisen; 2013	Succeeded by Sigbjørn Apeland
