= Restored, Returned =

Studio album by Tord Gustavsen Ensemble
- Released: October 12, 2009
- Recorded: January 2009
- Studio: Rainbow Studio; Oslo, Norway
- Genre: Jazz
- Length: 51:07
- Label: ECM; ECM 2107
- Producer: Manfred Eicher

Tord Gustavsen chronology
Being There (2007)	Restored, Returned (2009)	The Well (2011)

Restored, Returned is an album by Norwegian jazz pianist and composer Tord Gustavsen Ensemble recorded in January 2009 and released on ECM later that year.

Professional ratings
Review scores
Source	Rating
The Guardian	4/5 stars

== Reception ==
The Guardian review by John Fordham awarded the album 4 stars. The All About Jazz reviewer John Kelman stated:

Gustavsen continues to be a marvel of economical invention, a player who speaks little but says much. Restored, Returned is a logical extension/expansion on his previous ECM releases, as his nuanced, tender playing eschews stereotypical references to Norwegian music as icy or cool, even as "The Way In" cinematically traverses imaginary bodies of water explored regularly by pianist Ketil Bjørnstad. But with more colors at his disposal and a greater attention to song form—even as the result feels somehow freer—Gustavsen has shaped an album even more appealing in its subtle but unmistakable experimentation

== Track listing ==
1. "The Child Within" (3:48)
2. "Way In" (4:29)
3. "Lay Your Sleeping Head, My Love" (2:50)
4. "Spiral Song" (4:01)
5. "Restored, Returned" (5:55)
6. "Left Over Lullaby No. 2" (4:44)
7. "The Swirl/Wrapped In a Yielding Air" (5:23)
8. "Left Over Lullaby No. 1/O Stand, Stand At the Window" (7:18)
9. "Your Crooked Heart" (3:41)
10. "The Gaze" (5:39)
11. "Left Over Lullaby No. 3" (3:04)

== Personnel ==
- Tord Gustavsen – piano
- Kristin Asbjørnsen – vocals (tracks: 3–8, 11)
- Tore Brunborg – tenor saxophone (tracks: 4–8, 10) & soprano saxophone (track: 1)
- Mats Eilertsen – double bass (tracks: 2–10)
- Jarle Vespestad – drums (tracks: 2–10)

== Credits ==
- Design – Sascha Kleis
- Engineer – Jan Erik Kongshaug
- Cover photography – Jan Fricke
- Liner photos – Hans Fredrik Asbjørnsen
- Producer – Manfred Eicher
- Words By – W. H. Auden (tracks: 3, 5, 7, 8)

== Notes ==
- All compositions by Tord Gustavsen
- Lyrics in tracks 3, 5, 7 & 7 are from Auden's "Another Time"
- Recorded in January 2009 at Rainbow Studio, Oslo
- Producer Manfred Eicher at ECM Records
