= Bodil Niska =

Norwegian jazz musician (born 1954)

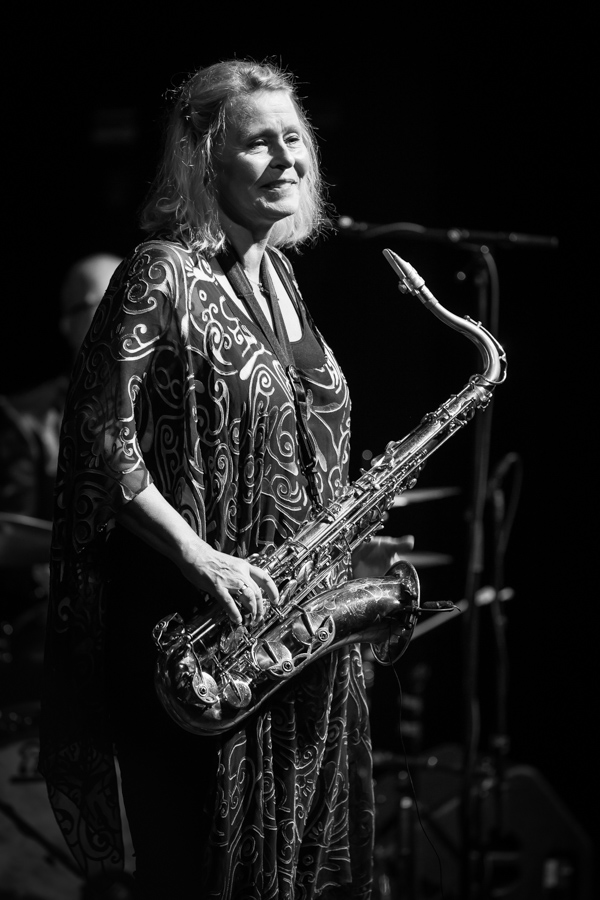
- Bodil Niska at Oslo jazzfestival (2015).

Background information
- Birth name: Bodil Aileen Niska
- Born: 21 August 1954 (age 71); Vadsø, Finnmark
- Origin: Norway
- Genres: Jazz
- Occupation: Musician
- Instrument: Tenor saxophone
- Website: www.niska.no

Bodil Aileen Niska (born 21 August 1954 in Vadsø, Norway) is a Norwegian jazz saxophonist known for her recordings of jazz standards.

== Career ==
Raised in Hammerfest Municipality, she was taught music by her father, the accordion player Aksel Niska, and studied under the guidance of Kjell Bartholdsen, and ran the jazz club "Montenegro" (1979–89). After moving southward in Norway in 1990, Niska collaborated within the trio "Girl Talk" from 1992, the other members being Tine Asmundsen (double bass) and Elizabeth Walker. They recorded the album Talkin' Jazz (1996). She formed the Bodil Niska Quartet, including Per Husby (piano), Stig Hvalryg (bass) and Roger Johansen (drums), at the Oslo Jazz Festival in 2005. She is also known for her collaboration with Pete Brown Trio, including Scott Hamilton and Harry Allen.

Niska has established the "Bare Jazz" store in Oslo, and a record label by the same name. For her work she received "Sildajazzprisen" in 2005 and the Oslo Jazz Festival award "Ella-prisen" in 2009.

== Honors ==
- 2005:"Sildajazzprisen" at the Jazz Festival in Haugesund
- 2009: "Nordprofil-prisen
- 2009: "Ella-prisen at Oslo Jazzfestival

== Discography ==
=== Solo albums ===
- 2000: First Song (Hot Club Records), including Egil Kapstad, Bjørn Alterhaug and Pelle Hultén (contributions by Aksel Niska)
- 2004: Blue (Bare Jazz Records), with Kapstad, Alterhaug, Hulten & Paul Wagnberg
- 2008: Night Time (Bare Jazz Records), with Claes Crona Trio & Staffan William-Olsson

=== Collaborative works ===
- 1993: Noe Som Har Hendt (Kirkelig Kulturverksted), with "Dronning Mauds Land»
- 1996: Talkin' Jazz (Hot Club Records), within the trio "Girl Talk»
- 2006: Sakte Sanger (Park Grammofon), with Anne Lande & Per Husby

Awards
Preceded by Alf Wilhelm Lundberg	Recipient of the Sildajazzprisen; 2005	Succeeded by Staffan William-Olsson
