= Being There (disambiguation) =

Being There is a 1979 film directed by Hal Ashby.

Being There may also refer to:

- Being There (novel), a 1970 novel by Jerzy Kosinski; basis for the film
- Being There (Tord Gustavsen album), 2007
- Being There (Wilco album), 1996
- Being There: Putting Brain, Body and World Together Again, a 1997 book by Andy Clark

== See also ==
- Dasein (English: "being there"), a philosophical concept associated with Martin Heidegger
