= The Ground (album) =

Studio album by the Tord Gustavsen Trio
- Released: January 31, 2005
- Recorded: January 2004
- Studio: Rainbow Studio; Oslo, Norway
- Genre: Jazz
- Length: 63:05
- Label: ECM; ECM 1892
- Producer: Manfred Eicher

Tord Gustavsen chronology
Changing Places (2003)	The Ground (2005)	Being There (2005)

The Ground is an album by the Tord Gustavsen Trio, with bassist Harald Johnsen and drummer Jarle Vespestad, recorded in January 2004 and released by ECM in January the following year.

Professional ratings
Review scores
Source	Rating
The Guardian	5/5 stars
AllMusic	3.5/5 stars
The Penguin Guide to Jazz Recordings	3.5/4 stars

== Reception ==
The Guardian reviewer Stuart Nicholson, who awarded the album 5 stars, stated, "Melancholia is marvellous—and quiet."

The AllMusic review by Michael G. Nastos awarded the album 3½ stars, stating, "Gustavsen, while playing laid-back, pristine, pretty, and serene music, is far from challenging convention or pushing the envelope. Conversely, his personal voice is fully realized. Time will tell whether this style finds a worldwide audience, moves away from this type of contemporary texture music, or takes the approach he has established to any more extreme measures, even softer or more forceful."

== Track listing ==
1. "Tears Transforming" (5:38)
2. "Being There" (4:17)
3. "Twins" (4:57)
4. "Curtains Aside" (5:15)
5. "Colours of Mercy" (6:09)
6. "Sentiment" (5:35)
7. "Kneeling Down" (5:48)
8. "Reach Out and Touch It" (5:48)
9. "Edges of Happiness" (3:07)
10. "Interlude" (2:03)
11. "Token of Tango" (4:12)
12. "The Ground" (7:16)

== Personnel ==
=== Tord Gustavsen Trio ===
- Tord Gustavsen – piano
- Harald Johnsen – bass
- Jarle Vespestad – drums

== Credits ==
- All compositions by Tord Gustavsen
- Cover design by Sascha Kleis
- Engineered by Jan Erik Kongshaug
- Liner photos by Chris Tribble
- Produced by Manfred Eicher
