= Sildajazzprisen =

Norwegian jazz music award

Sildajazzprisen awarded by the company Statoil to a Norwegian jazz musician or group. The award consists of a sum of money and a picture signed the year Sildajazz artist.

Statoil sildajazz Prize was first awarded in 2000.

== Award winners ==
- 2000: The Brazz Brothers, from Langevåg
- 2001: Egil Kapstad, from Kristiansand
- 2002: Svein Olav Herstad, from Haugesund
- 2003: Dag Arnesen, from Bergen
- 2004: Alf Wilhelm Lundberg, from Haugesund
- 2005: Bodil Niska, from Oslo
- 2006: Staffan William-Olsson, from Oslo
- 2007: Christina Bjordal, from Haugesund
- 2008: Olav Dale, from Voss
- 2009: Sigurd Ulveseth, from Bergen
- 2010: Fredrik Luhr Dietrichson, from Haugesund
- 2011: Marius Neset, from Os
- 2012: Marte Maaland Eberson, from Bergen
- 2013: Julius Lind, from Haugesund
- 2014: Johannes Ulveraker, from Haugesund
- 2015: Peder "LIDO" Losnegård, from Tysvær
- 2016: Mia Marlen Berg, from Tysvær
- 2017: Trond Kallevåg Hansen
- 2018: Dorothea Økland
- 2019: Håvard Ersland
