= Seitenwechsel =

- Theatrical release Poster
- Directed by: Vivian Naefe
- Written by: Andrea Sixt; Katharina Eyssen
- Produced by: André Zoch; Mischa Hofmann
- Starring: Mina Tander; Wotan Wilke Möhring; Ruby O. Fee; Friederike Kempter; Anna Maria Mühe
- Cinematography: Hagen Bogdanski
- Edited by: Robert Rzesacz
- Music by: Johannes Repka
- Production companies: H&V Entertainment; SevenPictures Film; Warner Bros. Film Productions Germany
- Distributed by: Warner Bros. Pictures
- Release date: 2 June 2016
- Country: Germany
- Language: German

Seitenwechsel is a 2016 German Comedy Film directed by Vivian Naefe, based on the 2006 Brazilian film by If I Were You.

It was released on June 2, 2016, by Warner Bros. Pictures.

== Plot ==
A man and a woman switch their bodies and try to handle their occupations as a soccer trainer and a psychologist.

== Cast ==
- Mina Tander as Teresa Paschke
- Wotan Wilke Möhring as Alex Paschke
- Ruby O. Fee as Julia Paschke
- Friederike Kempter as Rebecca
- Anna Maria Mühe as Jenny
- Axel Stein as Moritz
- Frederick Lau as Leonard Ritter
- Steve Windolf as Marc
- Jimi Blue Ochsenknecht as Andy
- Anna Stieblich as Therapeutin
- Ludger Pistor as Therapeut
