= The Well (Tord Gustavsen album) =

Studio album by Tord Gustavsen Quartet
- Released: January 27, 2012
- Recorded: February 2011
- Studio: Rainbow Studio; Oslo, Norway
- Genre: Jazz
- Length: 53:13
- Label: ECM; ECM 2237
- Producer: Manfred Eicher

Tord Gustavsen chronology
Restored, Returned (2009)	The Well (2012)	Extended Circle (2014)

The Well is a jazz album by the Tord Gustavsen Quartet, featuring Gustavsen on piano, Tore Brunborg on saxophone, Mats Eilertsen on bass and Jarle Vespestad on drums, recorded in February 2011, and released on ECM in January the following year.

Professional ratings
Review scores
Source	Rating
Allmusic	4/5 stars

== Reception ==
The AllMusic review by Thom Jurek awarded the album 4 stars stating:

The title cut, the other pillar of this album, commences with a mysterious, nearly floating lyric figure stated on piano and answered by Brunborg's warm, welcoming tenor before it enters the realm of something approaching drift. That said, the focus on melody is quietly intense, even as the track becomes more abstract toward the middle; bass, piano, and saxophone all trade fours in rotation, answering and questioning further. Brunborg even moves toward blues in his solo. Playing quietly does require tremendous energy and discipline, and often runs counter to the improviser's instincts.

== Track listing ==
All tracks are written by Tord Gustavsen

No.	Title	Length
1.	"Prelude"	2:51
2.	"Playing"	5:38
3.	"Suite"	8:22
4.	"Communion"	4:36
5.	"Circling"	4:42
6.	"Glasgow Intro"	1:13
7.	"On Every Corner"	5:14
8.	"The Well"	5:50
9.	"Communion, Var."	5:58
10.	"Intuition"	4:33
11.	"Inside"	4:16

== Personnel ==
=== Tord Gustavsen Quartet ===
- Tord Gustavsen – piano
- Tore Brunborg – tenor saxophone
- Mats Eilertsen – double bass
- Jarle Vespestad – drums

=== Production ===
- Manfred Eicher – production
