= Julius Lind =

Norwegian jazz and rock bassist

- Born: 13 September 1977 (age 48); Haugesund, Rogaland, Norway
- Genres: Jazz, rock
- Occupations: Musician, composer
- Instrument: Double bass
- Website: www.juliuslind.com

Julius Lind (born 13 September 1977) is a Norwegian jazz and rock bassist.

== Early life ==
Lind studied at the jazz program at Trondheim Musikkonsevatorium, and play in the bands The Gin and Tonic Youth, Ape club, Action&Tension&Space and Blow.

== Career ==
Lind played double bass within the Norwegian rockabilly band Rex Rudi (2000–08). He also played with Girl from Saskatoon, and in 2010 he appeared within his own Julius Lind Quartet on club gigs.

== Honors ==
- 2013: Sildajazzprisen

== Discography ==
=== Rex Rudi ===
- 2001: Rexmaskin demo
- 2003: Kampens Hete (Tylden & Co)
- 2003: Rock'n'Roll Jul (One-Eyed Cat)
- 2005: Backbeat & Begjær (Norsk Rock)
- 2008: Så Lenge Det Er Natt (Norsk Rock)
- 2008: Alt Er Vel (Norsk Rock)

=== Brødrene Löwenstierne ===
- 2012: Gå Til Onkel
- 2013: Brødrene Löwenstierne & Their Calypso Quintet

=== Others ===
- 2006: This Is Only the Beginning within Girl from Saskatoon
- 2011: New Times within The Gin and Tonic Youth
- 2012: Action and Tension and Space (Made in Haugesund)
- 2013: Ape Club (Recorda)
- 2017: What you wish for - Ape Club (Recorda Records)
- 2018: Frukt og Tobago - Henrik Horge og Calypsokameratene (Noise...What?!Records)
- 2018: Skåredalen Funhouse - Action & Tension & Space (Kapitän Platte)
- 2019: Explosive Meditations - Action & Tension & Space (Kapitän Platte)
- 2021: As it Unfolds - Julius Lind (Hulio records)
- 2022: Tellus - Action & Tension & Space (Rune Grammofon)
- 2023: Korallrev og pølsevev - Henrik Horge og Calypsokameratene (Noise...What?!Records)
- 2024: Lights - Julius Lind (Kapitän Platte)
- 2025: New Dimensions - Action & Tension & Space (Sheep Chase Records)

Awards
Preceded by Marte Maaland Eberson	Recipient of the Sildajazzprisen; 2013	Succeeded by -
