= Changing Places (album) =

Studio album by Tord Gustavsen Trio
- Released: March 18, 2003
- Recorded: December 2001; June 2002
- Studio: Rainbow Studio; Oslo, Norway
- Genre: Jazz
- Length: 65:55
- Label: ECM; ECM 1834
- Producer: Manfred Eicher

Tord Gustavsen chronology
Changing Places (2003)	The Ground (2005)

Changing Places is an album by the Tord Gustavsen Trio recorded in December 2001 and June 2002 and released March 18, 2003 on ECM. The trio features rhythm section Harald Johnsen and Jarle Vespestad.

Professional ratings
Review scores
Source	Rating
AllMusic	2.5/5 stars
The Penguin Guide to Jazz Recordings	4/4 stars

== Reception ==
The AllMusic review by Glenn Astarita states:

The bulk of this production consists of the trio's probing inclinations and lightly implemented rhythmic structures. Gustavsen's multifaceted arsenal features an abundance of swirling arpeggios, nimbly rendered harmonics, and gently fabricated block chords. Alternatively, the total listening experience becomes a bit arduous in scope, due to the band's unwavering gait. Nonetheless, Gustavsen is most certainly one to watch!

== Track listing ==
All tracks are written by Tord Gustavsen.

No.	Title	Length
1.	"Deep as Love"	5:54
2.	"Graceful Touch"	3:50
3.	"IGN"	4:33
4.	"Melted Matter"	5:25
5.	"At a Glance"	4:18
6.	"Song of Yearning"	8:16
7.	"Turning Point"	5:47
8.	"Interlude"	1:01
9.	"Where Breathing Starts"	8:49
10.	"Going Places"	5:33
11.	"Your Eyes"	5:07
12.	"Graceful Touch, Variation"	4:33
13.	"Song of Yearning (Solo)"	1:59

== Personnel ==
=== Tord Gustavsen Trio ===
- Tord Gustavsen – piano
- Harald Johnsen – bass
- Jarle Vespestad – drums

=== Additional personnel ===
- Manfred Eicher – producer
- Jan Erik Kongshaug – engineer
- Sascha Kleis – cover photography, artwork design
- Erik J. Laeskogen – liner photos

== Charts ==
=== Monthly charts ===
2025 monthly chart performance for Changing Places
Chart (2025)	Peak position
German Jazz Albums (Offizielle Top 100)	15
