= Christian Berkel =

German actor (born 1957)

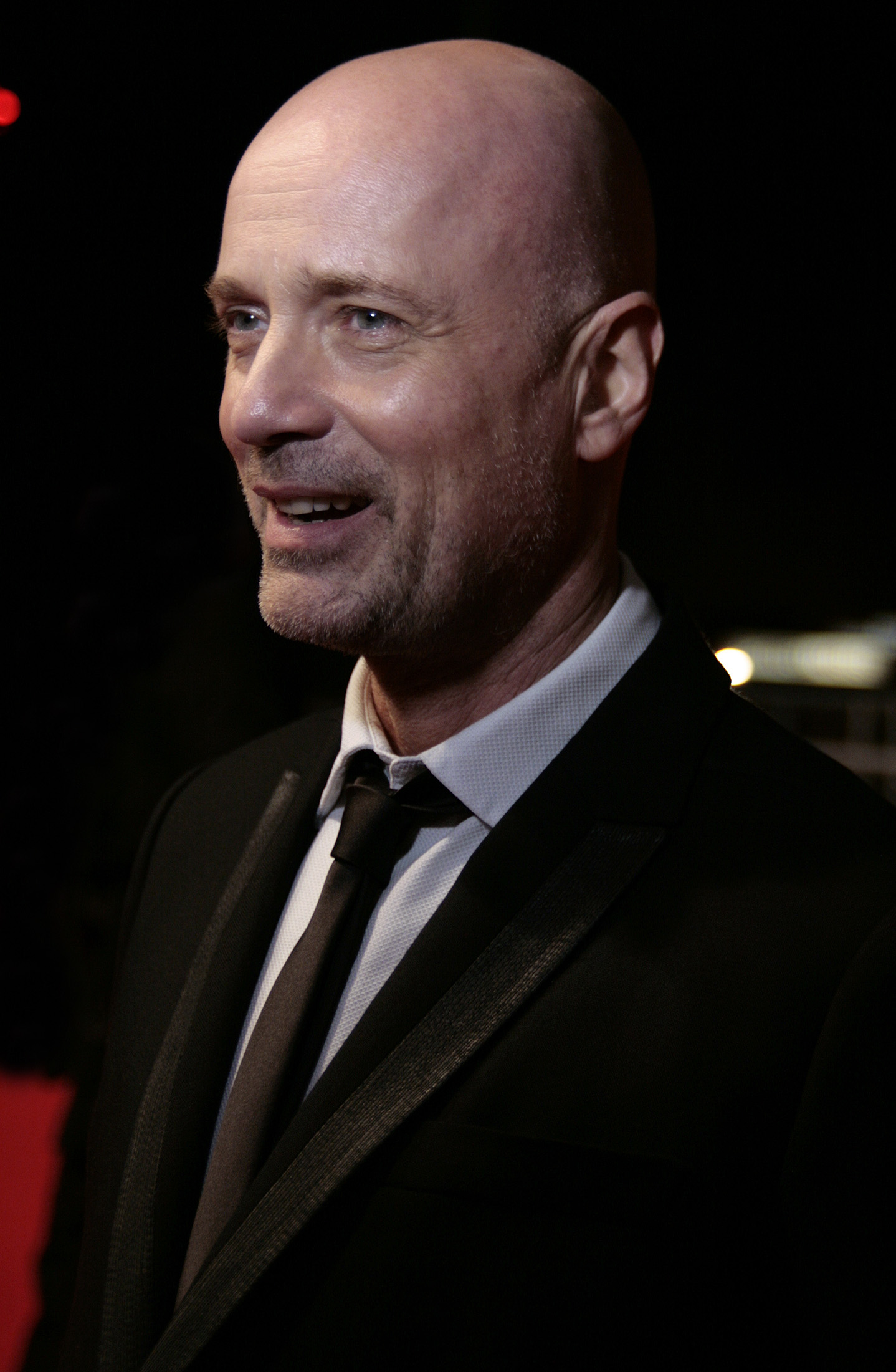
- Berkel in 2009
- Born: 28 October 1957 (age 69); West Berlin, West Germany
- Occupation: Actor
- Years active: 1977–present
- Spouse: Andrea Sawatzki (m. 2011)
- Children: 2

Christian Berkel (born 28 October 1957) is a German actor. He is known for his appearances in Downfall (2004), Black Book (film) (2006), Valkyrie (2008), Inglourious Basterds (2009) and The Man from U.N.C.L.E. (2015).

== Life and career ==
Berkel was born on 28 October 1957 in Berlin.

His father had been a military doctor in World War II. His Jewish mother fled to Argentina and returned to Germany after the end of the war.

From the age of 14 Berkel lived in Paris where he took drama lessons with Jean-Louis Barrault and Pierre Berlin. He then trained at the German Film and Television Academy Berlin and appeared on stage in Augsburg, Düsseldorf, Munich, Vienna and at the Schiller Theater.

Berkel has appeared in many German television productions before starring in the Academy Award-nominated film Downfall (2004) as Dr. Ernst-Günther Schenck. He has followed this with roles in Paul Verhoeven's film Black Book (2006) and the American films Flightplan (2005), Valkyrie (2008) and Inglourious Basterds (2009).

== Personal life ==
In addition to his native German, Berkel speaks English and French.

Berkel met actress Andrea Sawatzki in 1998. They were married in 2011. The couple have two sons. The family live in Berlin.

== Filmography ==
- 1977: Maiden's War - Karol Djudko
- 1977: The Serpent's Egg - Student
- 1978: Tatort - Rot, rot, tot (TV) - Doc Decker / Dr. Alfred Waller / Erik Steinbeck / Rainer Wenisch / Uwe Pfandler
- 1982: Frau Jenny Treibel (TV) - Leopold Treibel
- 1983: Derrick - Season 10, Episode 06: "Tödliches Rendezvous" - Manfred Kessler
- 1989: Der Bastard (TV series) - Felix Dennison
- 1991: Karniggels - Man #2 (voice)
- 1993: Das Schicksal der Lilian H. (TV) - Josef
- 1993: Ein unvergeßliches Wochenende ... in Salzburg (TV)
- 1996: Der Mann ohne Schatten (TV series) - Bruno Kuhlin
- 1996: Lautlose Schritte (TV) - Simon Sundermann
- 1997: Rossini - Weich
- 1997: Umarmung mit dem Tod (TV) - Lefevre
- 1998: Vicky's Nightmare (TV) - John Nadolny
- 1998: Tod auf Amrum (TV) - Rolf Spiekermann
- 1999: Sweet Little Sixteen (TV) - Thomas Reiner
- 2000: Verzweiflung
- 2000: Blondine sucht Millionär fürs Leben (TV) - Dietrich
- 2001: Das Experiment (The Experiment) - Robert Steinhoff Nr. 38
- 2002: Safe Conduct - Dr. Greven
- 2002: Die Affäre Semmeling (TV series) - Fred Kiefer
- 2002: Der Unbestechliche - Harald Kittler
- 2003: Erste Liebe (TV)
- 2004: Soundless - Lang
- 2004: Der Untergang (Downfall) - Prof. Ernst-Günther Schenck
- 2004: Männer wie wir (Guys and Balls) - Rudolf
- 2005: Der Vater meiner Schwester (TV) - Dr. Klaus Merbold
- 2005: Tatort - Leerstand (TV) - Doc Decker
- 2005: Flightplan (film) - Mortuary Director
- 2006: Storm Tide (TV) - Innensenator Helmut Schmidt
- 2006: Eine Frage des Gewissens (A Question Of The Conscience) (TV) - Martin Beltz
- 2006: Black Book - General Käutner
- 2006: Der Kriminalist (TV) - Kriminalhauptkommissar Bruno Schumann
- 2007: The Other Boy - Jakob Wagner
- 2008: Flame & Citron (film) - Hoffmann
- 2008: Mogadischu (film) - Chancellor Helmut Schmidt
- 2008: Haber (film) - Fritz Shimon Haber
- 2008: Miracle at St. Anna (film) - Captain Eichholz
- 2008: Valkyrie (film) - Colonel Albrecht Mertz von Quirnheim
- 2009: Inglourious Basterds (film) - Proprietor Eric
- 2009: Attack on Leningrad (film) - Vinkelmayer
- 2010: The Last Employee - David Böttcher
- 2011: The Man with the Bassoon - Heinrich Bockelmann
- 2013: Buddy (film) - Martin
- 2014: Elly Beinhorn: Solo Flight (TV) - Ernst Udet
- 2015: Traumfrauen - Herr Hegemann
- 2015: Anti-Social - Philip
- 2015: The Man from U.N.C.L.E. (film) - Dr. Udo Teller
- 2015: Trumbo (film) - Otto Preminger
- 2016: Elle (film) - Robert
- 2016: The Jungle Book - King Louie (German dubbing, originally performed by Christopher Walken)
- 2020: The Magic Kids: Three Unlikely Heroes - Louis Ziffer
- 2020: Enfant Terrible
- 2026: Block 10 - Dr. Maximilian Samuel
