= Christina Bjordal =

Norwegian jazz singer

- Born: Christina Elisabeth Nesse Bjordal; 25 September 1980 (age 46); Haugesund, Rogaland, Norway
- Genre: Jazz
- Occupations: Musician, composer
- Instrument: Vocals
- Label: Universal Music
- Website: christinabjordal.com

Christina Elisabeth Nesse Bjordal (born 25 September 1980 in Haugesund, Norway) is a Norwegian jazz singer.

== Career ==
Bjordal let out her debut album Where Dreams Begin, within Christina Bjordal Band in 2003. Two years later she signed up with Universal Music, which resulted in a new solo album Brighter Days (2006). On the latest solo release Warrior of Light (2009) Bjordal is joined by a cream team of musicians, among them Bugge Wesseltoft, Nils Petter Molvær, Mathias Eick, Bendik Hofseth and Nils-Olav Johansen. During the last couple of years she has established her name in the Norwegian vocal jazz genre. They were granted great reviews. She puts her heart into the album with her own lyrics and melodies. Bjordal received the Sildajazzprisen in 2007.

Recently Bjordal has performed at several jazz festivals, like Kongsberg Jazzfestival, both with her solo projects and opening a concert together with Karin Krog, Nattjazz in Bergen, Oslo Jazz festival, Canal Street, the Jazz and Blues Festival in Arendal, Sildajazz in Haugesund, and Edinburgh Jazz and Blues Festival. She has also performed at Norwegian embassies in both London and Edinburgh.

== Honors ==
- 2007: Sildajazzprisen

== Discography ==
=== Solo albums ===
Within Christina Bjordal Band

- 2003: Where Dreams Begin (Universal Music)

As soloist

- 2006: Brighter Days (Universal Music).
- 2009: Warrior of Light (Universal Music).

=== Collaborative works ===
With various artists

- 2007: New Voices (EmArcy)
- 2007: Verve Today (Verve Records)

Awards
Preceded by Staffan William-Olsson	Recipient of the Sildajazzprisen; 2007	Succeeded by Olav Dale
