= What Was Said =

Studio album by Tord Gustavsen Simin Tander Jarle Vespestad
- Released: January 29, 2016
- Recorded: April 2015; Rainbow Studio, Oslo
- Genre: Jazz
- Length: 59:50
- Label: ECM; ECM 2465
- Producer: Manfred Eicher

Tord Gustavsen chronology
Extended Circle (2014)	What Was Said (2016)	The Other Side (2018)

What Was Said (released January 29, 2016, on the ECM label) is an album by pianist Tord Gustavsen, vocalist Simin Tander and drummer Jarle Vespestad.

== Reception ==
Professional ratings
Review scores
Source	Rating
AllMusic	4/5 stars
The Guardian	4/5 stars

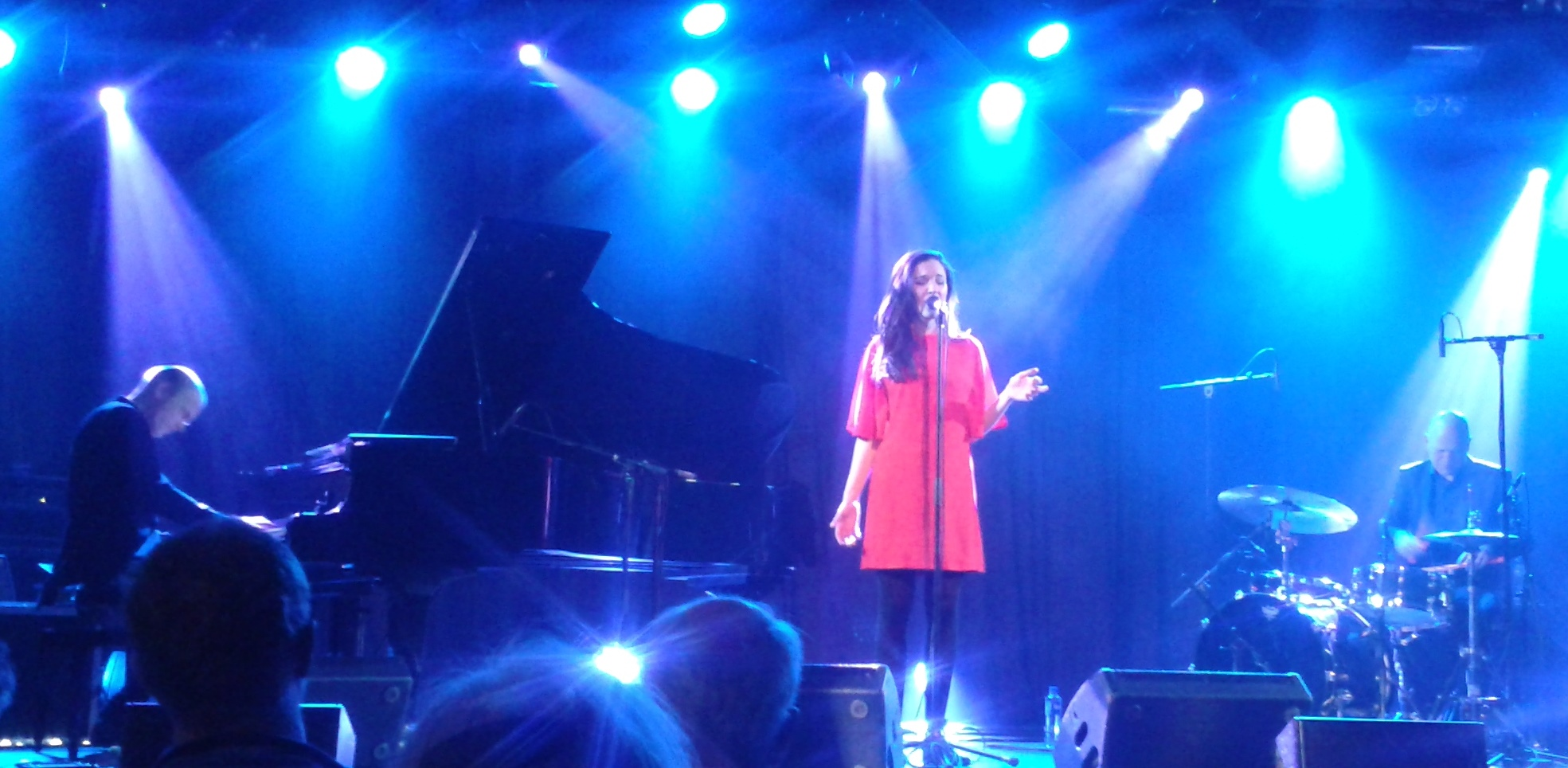
Tord Gustavsen with Simin Tander and Jarle Vespestad at Vossajazz 2016.

The AllMusic review by Thom Jurek awarded What Was Said 4 stars and stated "This band incorporates improvisational elements into the core of each composition, and the role of the singer is as a co-conspirator in the creation of the moment.". They also selected it as one of their Favorite Jazz Albums of 2016.

Writing in The Guardian, John Fordham called it "returning to simple songs with religious roots, and to collaboration with a remarkable singer".

The All About Jazz review by Mark Sullivan said that "However unorthodox all this cross-translation seems, Tander makes it sound completely natural. Her intimate, lyrical voice is equally at home in both languages, as well as singing wordless vocalese and improvising. Gustavson still plays the piano as his main instrument, but has augmented it with discreet electronics and occasional synthesizer bass, while Vespestad provides percussive textures or timekeeping as required. So the group is a true trio, not just a vocalist with accompanists."

The album was awarded Album of the year by The German Record Critics' Award.

== Track listing ==
No.	Title	Length
1.	"Your Grief" (Created by Tord Gustavsen / Jalai Al-Din Rumi)	2:45
2.	"I See You" (Created by Hans Adolf Brorson / Traditional)	5:10
3.	"Imagine the Fog Disappearing" (Created by Mathilda Montgomery-Caderhielm / Wilhelm Andreas Wexels)	6:23
4.	"A Castle in Heaven" (Created by Bernt Støylen / Traditional)	4:46
5.	"Journey of Life" (Created by Elias Blix / Traditional)	7:26
6.	"I Refuse" (Created by Tord Gustavsen / Kenneth Rexroth)	5:42
7.	"What Was Said to the Rose/O Sacred Head" (Created by Tord Gustavsen / Hans Leo Hassler / Jalai Al-Din Rumi)	5:35
8.	"The Way You Play My Heart" (Created by Tord Gustavsen)	3:03
9.	"Rull" (Created by Tord Gustavsen)	3:08
10.	"The Source of Now" (Created by Tord Gustavsen / Jalai Al-Din Rumi)	4:25
11.	"Sweet Melting" (Created by Johan Ludvig Allendorf / Peder Jacobsen / Traditional)	3:23
12.	"Longing to Praise Thee" (Created by Traditional)	4:26
13.	"Sweet Melting Afterglow" (Created by Johan Ludvig Allendorf / Tord Gustavsen / Peder Jacobsen / Simin Tander / Traditional / Jarle Vespestad)	3:39

== Personnel ==
- Tord Gustavsen – piano
- Simin Tander – vocals
- Jarle Vespestad – drums
