= Alf Wilhelm Lundberg =

Norwegian Jazz musician and composer (born 1979)

- Born: 8 May 1979 (age 46); Haugesund, Rogaland
- Origin: Norway
- Genres: Jazz
- Occupations: Musician, composer
- Instruments: Guitar, piano
- Website: Official website

Alf Wilhelm Lundberg (born 8 May 1979 in Haugesund, Norway) is a Norwegian jazz musician (guitar and piano) and composer.

== Career ==
Lundberg studied music on the Jazz program at Trondheim Musikkonsevatorium, where he earned specialization in arranging and composition. In 2003 Lundberg was awarded the first prize at the "Umbria Jazz Clinics" in Italia as guitarist in a strong competition. He has subsequently also studied guitar under the guidance of Adam Rogers in New York and Nelson Veras in Paris.

Lundberg has toured England, Poland, Sweden, Finland, Italy and France with bands "All Strings Trio", "Faces" and "Kofi/Makowski Quartet", and played on some of the biggest jazz festivals in Europe, like Kongsberg Jazzfestival, London Jazz Festival and Umbria Jazz. He has also won Sildajazzprisen and the "Haugesund Kommunes Kulturstipend" in 2004. Has been described as one of the best guitarists in Norway and has been compared to jazz and classical giants like Egberto Gismonti, Keith Jarrett and Andrés Segovia by Norwegian reviewers.

== Honors ==
- 2003: First prize at the "Umbria Jazz Clinics" in Italia as guitarist
- 2004: Sildajazzprisen

== Discography ==
- 1999: Aroma, within "Aroma»
- 2008: Norchestra, within "Norchestra»
- 2010: Alle E Aleina, with Jan Toft

Awards
Preceded by Dag Arnesen	Recipient of the Sildajazzprisen; 2004	Succeeded by Bodil Niska
