= Tord Gustavsen =

Norwegian jazz pianist and composer (born 1970)

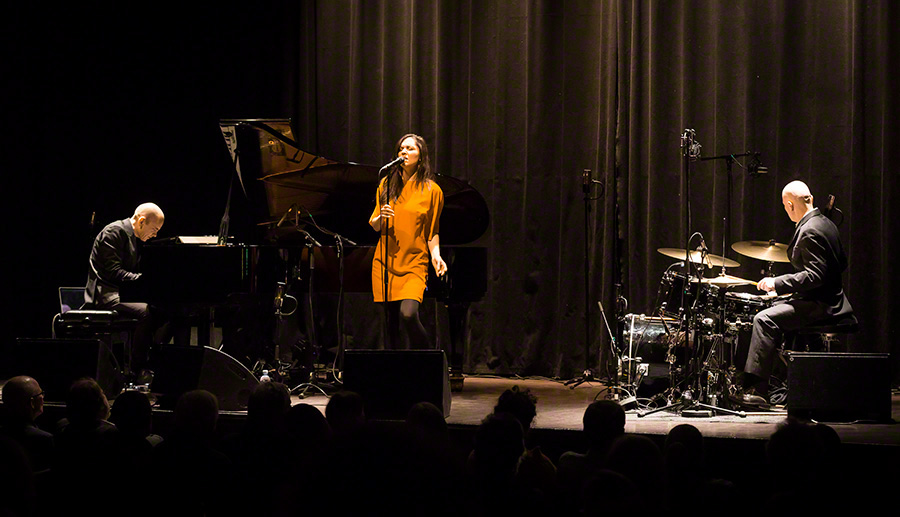
- Gustavsen with Simin Tander and Jarle Vespestad at Cosmopolite Scene in Oslo during Vinterjazz 2016

Background information
- Born: 5 October 1970 (age 55); Oslo, Norway
- Genres: Jazz
- Occupations: Musician, composer, bandleader
- Instrument: Piano
- Years active: 2003–present
- Label: ECM
- Website: tordg.no/index_2.html

Tord Gustavsen (born 5 October 1970) is a Norwegian jazz pianist and composer. He tours extensively worldwide, and he has been a bandleader for a trio, ensemble and quartet at various times, all bearing his name.

== Early life ==
Gustavsen was born on 5 October 1970 in Oslo and raised in rural Hurdal, Akershus. He "grew up playing church music".

== Later life and career ==
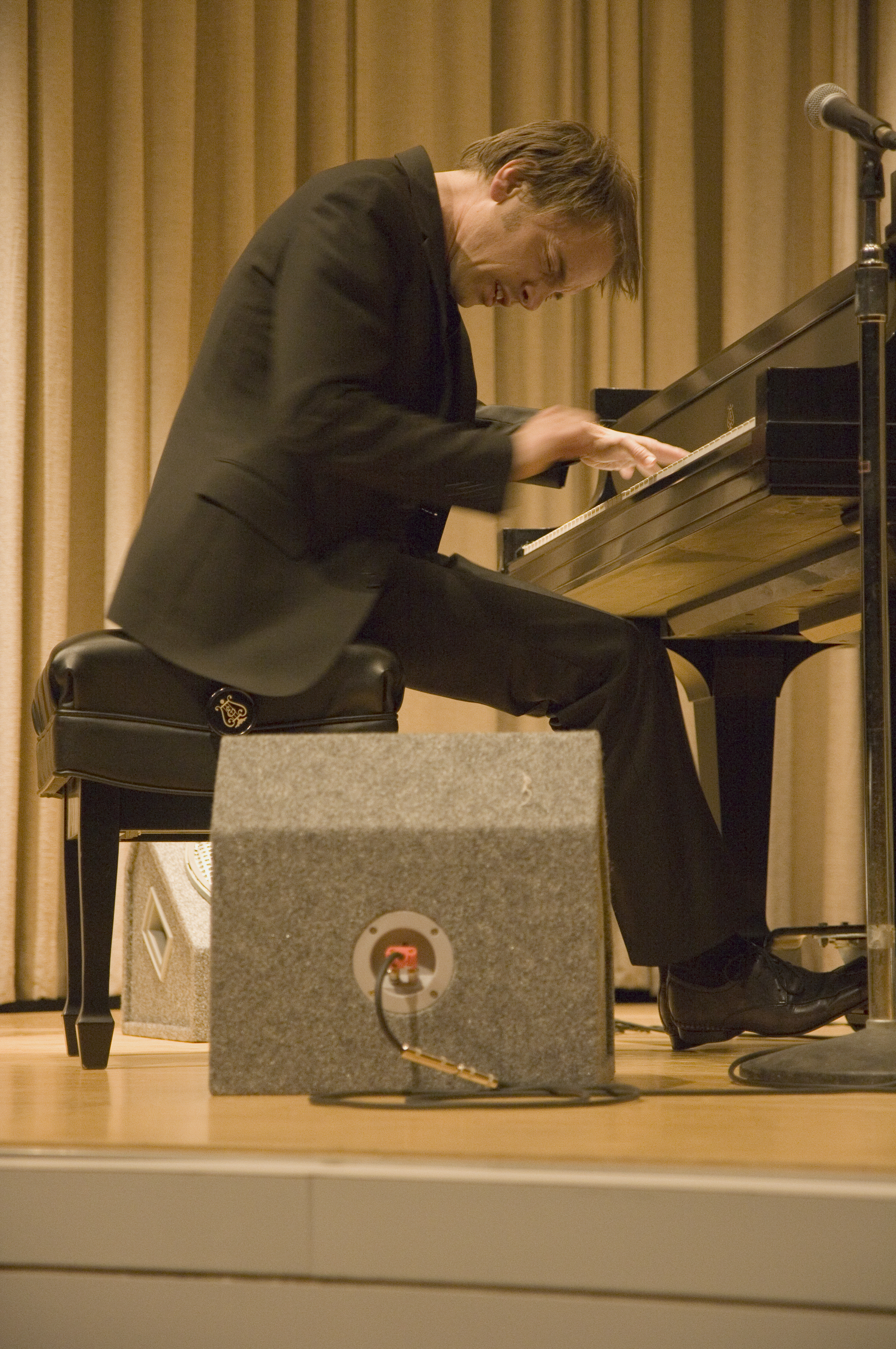
Gustavsen in 2007

Gustavsen holds a bachelor's degree (mellomfag) in psychology at the University of Oslo, before he attended the Trondheim Musikkonsevatorium for a three years study of jazz (1993–96). Thereafter he became a graduate (Cand.philol.) of musicology at the University of Oslo, where he was guest teacher of jazz piano and theory (1998–2002).

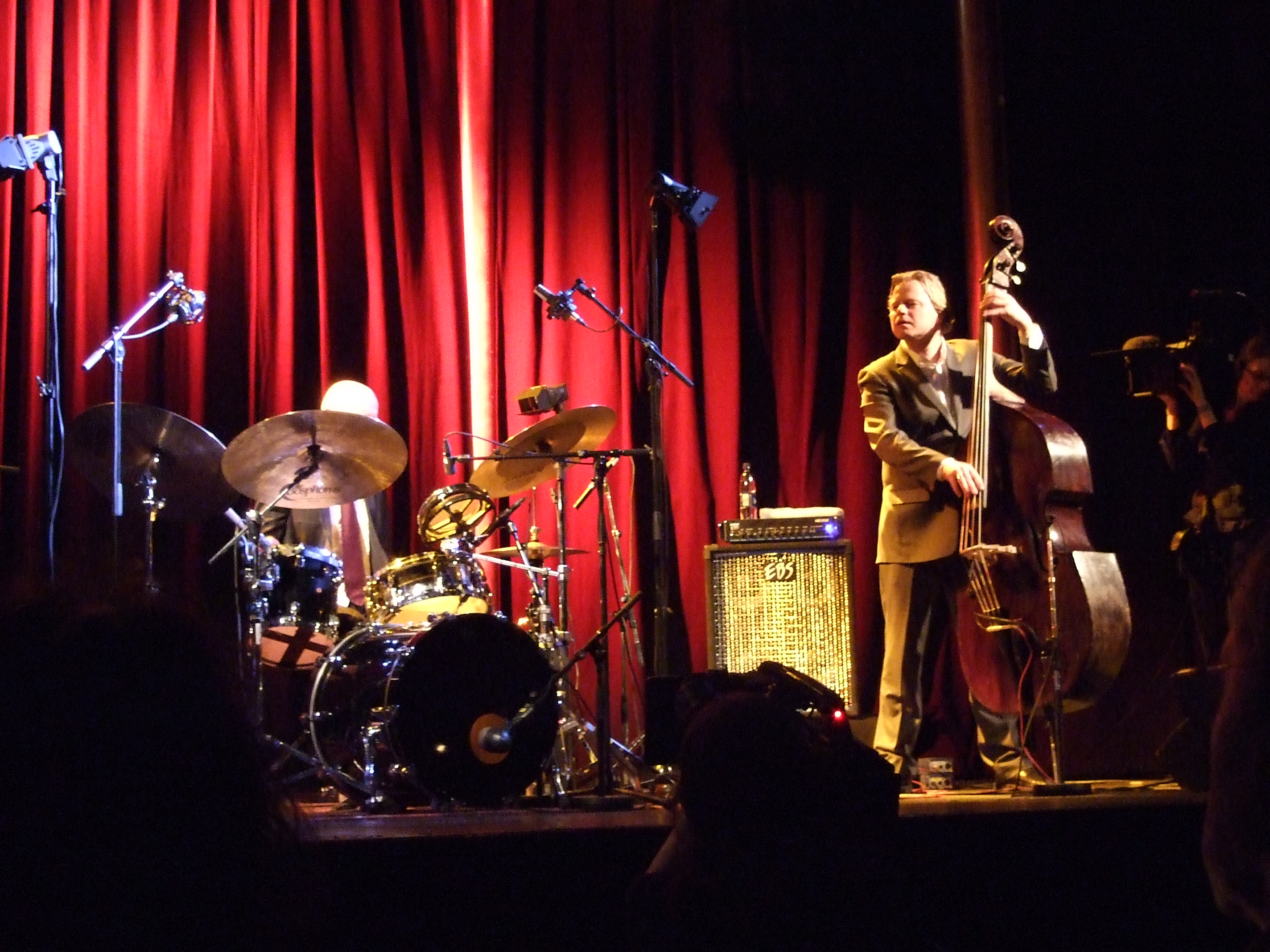
Tord Gustavsen Trio

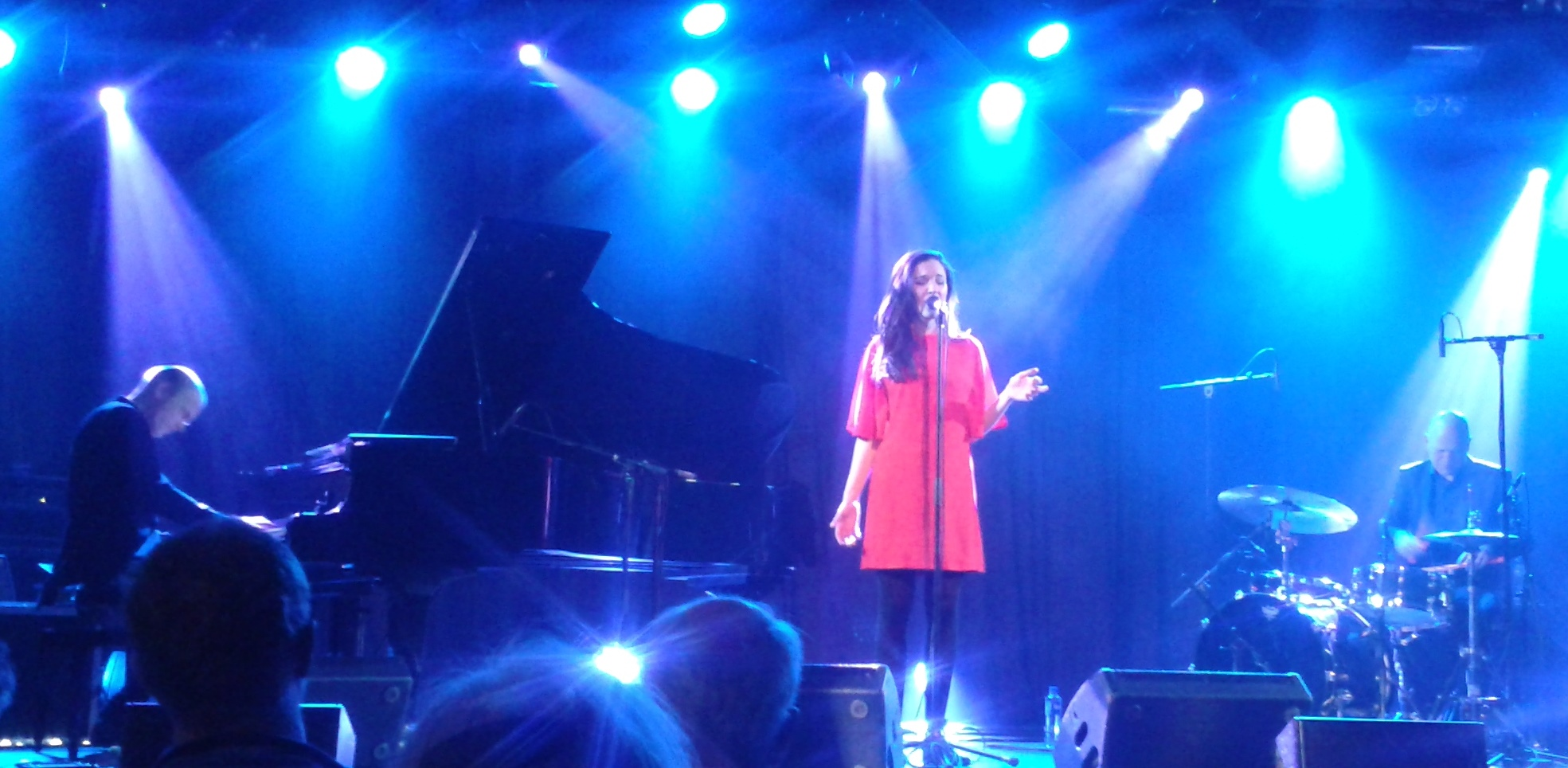
Gustavsen, Simin Tander and Jarle Vespestad at Vossajazz 2016.

Between 2003 and 2007 The Tord Gustavsen Trio released three albums on ECM Records. The trio was made up of Gustavsen on piano, Harald Johnsen on double bass and Jarle Vespestad on drums. The albums "contained rapt, pristine, meditative music, which resonated with the inner needs of a large, discriminating audience": combined sales exceeded 100,000. The trio won the Nattjazz prize in 2005.

A later ensemble was composed of Gustavsen, Tore Brunborg (saxophones), Mats Eilertsen (bass) and Vespestad (drums). With vocalist Kristin Asbjørnsen added for some tracks, the album Restored, Returned was recorded in 2009. The album was awarded with Spellemannsprisen (the Norwegian Grammy). The quartet's follow-up, The Well, was released in 2012. That year, Gustavsen played over four days at the Montreal Jazz Festival: with the quartet, as a solo pianist and in a duo with vocalist Solveig Slettahjell. The quartet album Extended Circle two years later "reveals a new edginess and dynamic impact that the quartet brings to Gustavsen's music."

In addition, he has recorded as a session musician, and guested on friends' albums. Collaborative projects have included Norwegian jazz vocalist and songwriter Silje Nergaard, musician Carl Petter Opsahl, actress Cecilie Jørstad and drummer Rune Arnesen, duo aire & angels and jazz vocalist Siri Gjære. He also took part in Nymark Collective established by Kåre Nymark. Since 2014 Gustavsen has collaborated with the German-Afghan jazz singer Simin Tander, releasing the album What Was Said (2016). They also performed at the 2016 Vinterjazz and the 2016 Vossajazz in Norway.

Gustavsen continues to be highly interested in psychology and has written a lengthy thesis on the paradoxes of improvisation, drawing on the dialectical psychological theory of Helm Stierlin and Anne-Lise Løvlie Schibbye.

== Honors ==
- 2005: Nattjazzprisen (for the Tord Gustavsen Trio)
- 2009: Spellemannprisen in the class Jazz (for the Tord Gustavsen Ensemble)

== Discography ==
=== Albums ===
Year	Formation credited	Album	Peak positions		
Year	Formation credited	Album	NOR	FRA	GER
2003	Tord Gustavsen Trio	Changing Places	32	–	–
2005	Tord Gustavsen Trio	The Ground	1	141	–
2007	Tord Gustavsen Trio	Being There	3	144	–
2009	Tord Gustavsen Ensemble	Restored, Returned	15	–	–
2012	Tord Gustavsen Quartet	The Well	4	194	100
2014	Tord Gustavsen Quartet	Extended Circle	24	103	–
2016	Tord Gustavsen with Simin Tander and Jarle Vespestad	What Was Said	31	–	72
2018	Tord Gustavsen Trio	The Other Side	40	–	58
2022	Tord Gustavsen Trio	Opening	–	–	–
2024	Tord Gustavsen Trio	Seeing	–	–	–

=== Collaborations ===
aire & angels duo with Siri Gjære

- aire & angels (1999)
- aire & angels II (2002)

Nymark Collective

- First meeting (2000)
- Contemporary tradition (2002)
- Bessie Smith Revisited - Live in concert (2008) - with Kristin Asbjørnsen

Silje Nergaard

- Port of Call (2000)
- At First Light (2001)
- Nightwatch (2003)
- The Essential + Live in Koln[DVD] (2005)

SKRUK

- SKRUK / Rim Banna Krybberom (2003)
- SKRUK / Torun Sævik / Cecilie Jørstad Sommerlandet (2004)
- SKRUK / Nymark Collective dype stille sterke milde (2006)
- SKRUK / Mahsa Vahdat I vinens Speil (2010)

Carl Petter Opsahl

- Indigodalen (Heilo, 2001)
- Improvisions (Park Grammofon, 2005)
- Love, The Blues (Park Grammofon, 2008)

Other projects

- Whoopin (2001)
- Humans & Places (2006) with Ulrich Drechsler Quartet
- ID (2007) with Anna Maria Jopek
- Sorgen og gleden (2008) with various artists
- Natt i Betlehem (2008) with Solveig Slettahjell (Peaked in NOR: No. 32)

Awards
Preceded by First award in 2005	Recipient of the Nattjazzprisen; 2005	Succeeded by Kjetil Møster
Preceded by Helge Lien Trio	Recipient of the Jazz Spellemannprisen; 2009	Succeeded by Elephant9
