= Buddy (2013 German film) =

- Theatrical Release Poster
- Directed by: Michael Herbig
- Written by: Michael Herbig
- Produced by: Christopher Doll; Michael Herbig
- Starring: Alexander Fehling; Michael Herbig; Mina Tander; Daniel Zillmann; Jann-Piet Puddu; Christian Berkel
- Cinematography: Torsten Breuer
- Edited by: Alexander Dittner
- Music by: Ralf Wengenmayr
- Production companies: herbX film; Warner Bros. Film Productions Germany
- Distributed by: Warner Bros. Pictures
- Release date: 25 December 2013
- Running time: 95 minutes
- Country: Germany
- Language: German
- Box office: $8.6 million

Buddy is a 2013 German comedy film produced, written, directed and starring Michael Herbig.

The film was released on 25 December 2013 by Warner Bros. Pictures.

== Cast ==
- Alexander Fehling as Eddie
- Mina Tander as Lisa
- Michael Herbig as Buddy
- Christian Berkel as Dr. Küster
- Daniel Zillmann as Hütte
- Jann-Piet Puddu as Sammy
- Alexander Wüst as Andi
- Nic Romm as Flo
- Judith Hoersch as Babsi
- Manou Lubowski as Einsatzleiter
