= Extended Circle =

Studio album by the Tord Gustavsen Quartet
- Released: January 17, 2014
- Recorded: June 2013
- Studio: Rainbow Studio; Oslo, Norway
- Genre: Jazz
- Length: 51:03
- Label: ECM 2358
- Producer: Manfred Eicher

Tord Gustavsen chronology
The Well (2012)	Extended Circle (2014)	What Was Said (2016)

Extended Circle is an album by the Tord Gustavsen Quartet recorded in June 2013 and released on ECM January the following year. The quartet features saxophonist Tore Brunborg and rhythm section Mats Eilertsen and Jarle Vespestad.

== Reception ==
Professional ratings
Review scores
Source	Rating
AllMusic	4/5 stars
The Guardian	4/5 stars

The AllMusic review by Thom Jurek awarded the album 4 stars and stated "On Extended Circle, the pianist's roots remain contemplative, but the maturity of the communication among these players provides a more fluid and physical sense of motion, revealing a multi-faceted approach to both playing his tunes and improvising."

Writing in The Guardian, John Fordham called it "a delicious collage of hypnotic grooving, softly stroked gospel themes, and perhaps more gloves-off jazz piano from the leader than on all five of his previous ECM albums."

The All About Jazz review by John Kelman said that "the evolution Expanded Circle demonstrates is equally the inevitable consequence of regular recording and touring with this group of hyper-talented musicians."

== Track listing ==
All tracks are written by Tord Gustavsen except as noted.

No.	Title	Writer(s)	Length
1.	"Right There"		2:55
2.	"Eg veit i himmerik ei borg"	Traditional Norwegian religious hymn	5:40
3.	"Entrance"	Vespestad; Eilertsen; Gustavsen; Brunborg	2:54
4.	"The Gift"		6:21
5.	"Staying There"		4:54
6.	"Silent Spaces"		3:32
7.	"Entrance [Variation]"	Vespestad; Eilertsen; Gustavsen; Brunborg	2:49
8.	"Devotion"		4:38
9.	"The Embrace"		5:01
10.	"Bass Transition"		0:43
11.	"Glow"		5:13
12.	"The Prodigal Song"		6:23

== Personnel ==
=== Tord Gustavsen Quartet ===
- Tord Gustavsen – piano
- Tore Brunborg – tenor saxophone
- Mats Eilertsen – bass
- Jarle Vespestad – drums
