= The Other Side (Tord Gustavsen album) =

Studio album by Tord Gustavsen Trio
- Released: August 31, 2018
- Recorded: January 2018
- Studio: Rainbow Studio; Oslo, Norway
- Genre: Jazz
- Length: 53:28
- Label: ECM 2608
- Producer: Manfred Eicher

Tord Gustavsen chronology
What Was Said (2016)	The Other Side (2018)

The Other Side is an album by the Tord Gustavsen Trio recorded in January 2018 and released on ECM August later that year. The trio features rhythm section Sigurd Hole and Jarle Vespestad.

== Reception ==
Professional ratings
Review scores
Source	Rating
AllMusic	4/5 stars
PopMatters	7/10 stars
All About Jazz	4/5 stars

AllMusic awarded the album 4 stars and the review by Thom Jurek stated "The Other Side represents a new beginning, one that exists in its own space apart from the larger group outings, but also separate from the previous trio. This group is more inquisitive than assertive -- whether playing one of Gustavsen's seven originals, traditional songs, or the three adaptations of J.S. Bach compositions ... The Other Side offers an expanded version of Gustavsen's trio signature. It retains the elemental articulations of melodic focus that made the previous version unique, but asks far more questions of the material needing to deliver answers, creating a constantly evolving, affirmative body of music."

On PopMatters, John Garratt noted "There's plenty to like in The Other Side 's loose feel in how composition swirls with improvisation. It's also too easy to let it pass you by ... Even when his playing is at its most rapid, Tord Gustavsen still applies a minimal approach that is frightened to wake the baby."

The All About Jazz review by Mike Jurkovic said that "All his compositions on The Other Side bare their secrets slowly and play out their methodically expressionistic hauntings with a gospel-influenced left hand seemingly rooted thousands of miles away in the muddy Louisiana delta ... The Other Side is a warm, whole-cloth adventure of spacious interiors ... Gustavsen freely mixes the ancient music of Norway with his love of Bach, the pianist arranging three chorales for the album; amongst them, the Vespestad-led "Schlafes Bruder" integrates a deep groove that Bach may never have imagined."

== Track listing ==
All compositions by Tord Gustavsen except where noted

No.	Title	Writer(s)	Length
1.	"The Tunnel"		6:04
2.	"Kirken, den er et gammelt hus"	Ludvig Mathias Lindeman	5:13
3.	"Re-Melt"		5:16
4.	"Duality"		4:37
5.	"Ingen vinner frem til den evige ro"	Traditional	3:54
6.	"Taste and See"		3:14
7.	"Schlafes Bruder"	Johann Sebastian Bach	4:54
8.	"Jesu, meine Freude / Jesus, det eneste"	Bach/Traditional	4:32
9.	"The Other Side"		3:24
10.	"O Traurigkeit"	Bach	3:33
11.	"Left Over Lullaby No. 4"		2:28
12.	"Curves"		6:19

== Personnel ==
=== Tord Gustavsen Trio ===
- Tord Gustavsen – piano
- Sigurd Hole – bass
- Jarle Vespestad – drums
