= Ditlef Eckhoff =

Norwegian jazz trumpeter (born 1942)

- Also known as: «Diffen»
- Born: 21 June 1942 (age 84); Stokke, Vestfold
- Origin: Norway
- Genre: Jazz
- Occupations: Musician, composer
- Instrument: Trumpet
- Website: www.jazzorakel.no/o/Person:Ditlef_Eckhoff

Ditlef Eckhoff (born 21 June 1942) is a Norwegian jazz musician (trumpet) known from numerous recordings and central to the Oslo Jazz Scene.

== Career ==
Eckhoff was born in Stokke, where he was active on the music scene. He led his own ensembles, won the Norwegian championship in jazz (1958), started Tønsberg jazz club (1958) and was the first head of the Tønsberg Society of Jazz & Poetry (1967). He resided in Oslo since 1959, and here he played with Einar Iversen (1959), Kristian Bergheim (1959), Arild Wikstrøm, Egil Kapstad and Egil Johansen. He studied education theory and trumpet at the Norwegian Academy of Music (1969–74) and participated in the University Big Band in Oslo (Chair 1974–1976). Eckhoff collaborated with international jazz greats such as Phil Woods/George Russell (1967), Dizzy Gillespie at Kongsberg Jazzfestival (1971), Red Mitchell/Kenny Drew at NRK Radio (1973), Dexter Gordon at Vossajazz (1975), and Horace Parlan (1980/83). Later he led his own quintet and moved to Nice in France. He led the Ditlef Eckhoff Quintet at Herr Nilsen Jazz Club in Oslo 2012.

== Discography ==
=== Solo albums ===
- 1980: Live at Jazz Alive, with Knut Riisnæs (saxophone), Ole Jacob Hansen (drums), Eivin Sannes (piano) & Kaj Hartvigsen (bass)
- 1997: Impressions of Antibes (Gemini Records), with Eric Reed live from scenes like Cosmopolite in Oslo
- 1998: Pastor'n & Diffen (Hi-Di), with Einar Iversen (piano), Odd André Elveland (saxophone), Mats Eilertsen (bass) & Ole Jacob Hansen (drums)
- 1999: Merry Christmas, with Jan Erik Kongshaug (guitar) & Sture Janson/Harald Johnsen bass (istedenfor Elveland og Eilertsen)
- 2007: Jazz au bord de mer, with Jan Berger (guitar) & Eddy Gaulein-Stef (bass)

=== Collaborations ===
With Terje Rypdal

- 1968: Bleak House (Polydor/Universal, Norway)

With other projects

- 2003: Bjørn Johansen in memoriam
