= Being There (Tord Gustavsen album) =

Studio album by Tord Gustavsen Trio
- Released: April 30, 2007
- Recorded: December 2006
- Studios: Rainbow Studio; Oslo, Norway
- Genre: Jazz
- Length: 59:31
- Labels: ECM; ECM 2017
- Producer: Manfred Eicher

Tord Gustavsen chronology
The Ground (2005)	Being There (2007)	Restored, Returned (2009)

Being There is an album by the Tord Gustavsen Trio recorded in December 2006 and released April 30, 2007 on ECM. The trio features rhythm section Harald Johnsen and Jarle Vespestad.

== Reception ==
Professional ratings
Review scores
Source	Rating
AllMusic	4/5 stars
The Penguin Guide to Jazz Recordings	4/4 stars

The AllMusic review by Thom Jurek states, "For a recording that unveils itself so gracefully, there is true heft in its presentation. As hinted at on Tord Gustavsen's earlier ECM dates, Being There is the fruit of labor meticulously crafted and dutifully harvested. It is an album of secrets echoed, and questions that are fathomlessly deep; it invites the listener in cleanly, without seduction, and argues for full participation in its revelations."

== Track listing ==
All tracks are written by Tord Gustavsen, except as indicated.

No.	Title	Writer(s)	Length
1.	"At Home"		6:08
2.	"Vicar Street"		3:43
3.	"Draw Near"		3:54
4.	"Blessed Feet"		6:06
5.	"Sani"		2:38
6.	"Interlude"		2:18
7.	"Karmosin"	Harald Johnsen	5:10
8.	"Still There"		4:19
9.	"Where We Went"		4:46
10.	"Cocoon"		5:49
11.	"Around You"		5:34
12.	"Vesper"		4:27
13.	"Wide Open"		4:39

== Personnel ==
=== Tord Gustavsen Trio ===
- Tord Gustavsen – piano
- Harald Johnsen – bass
- Jarle Vespestad – drums
