= Mina Tander =

German actress (born 1979)

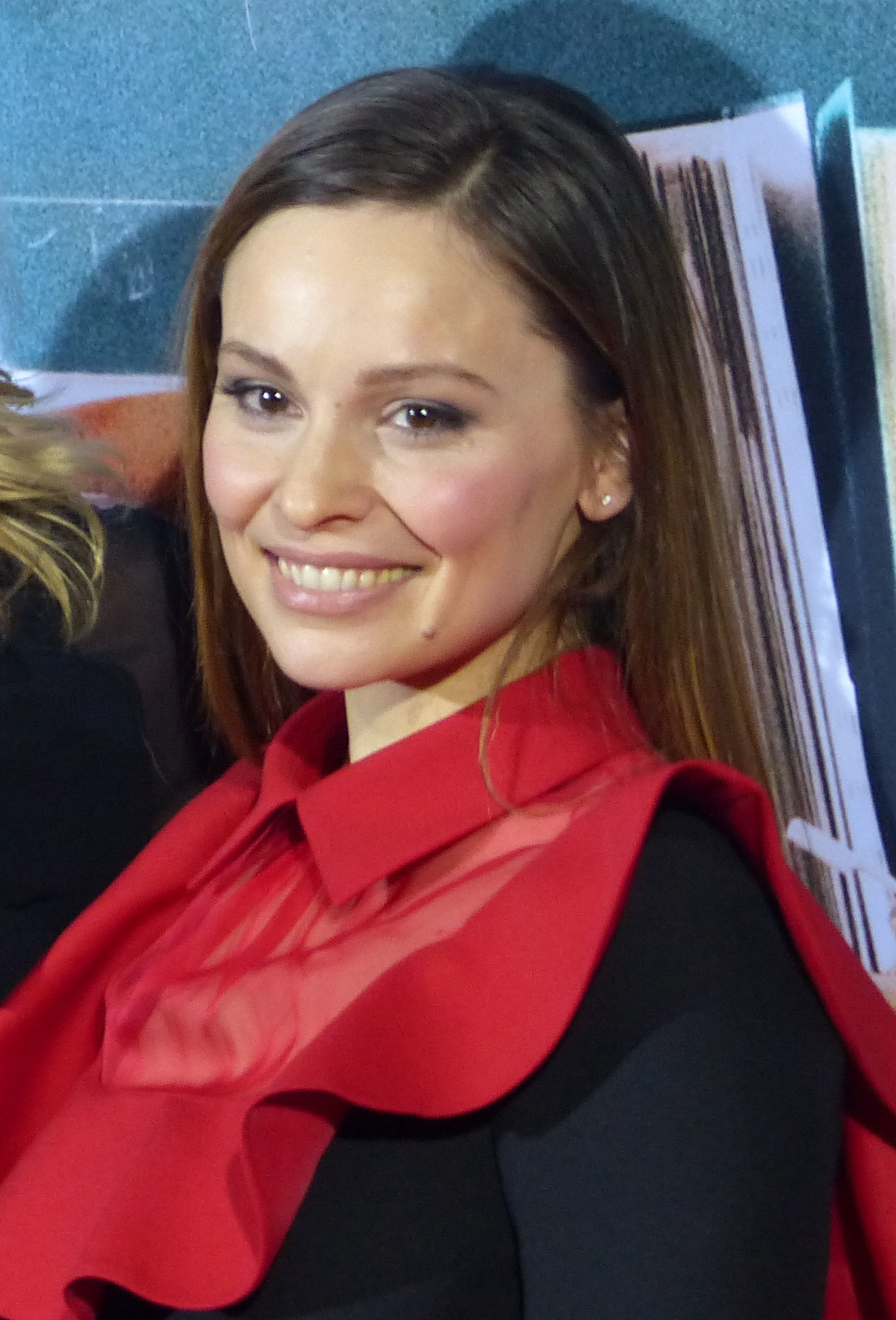
- Tander in 2015
- Born: 4 December 1979 (age 45); Cologne, West Germany
- Occupation: Actress
- Years active: 1995–present
- Relatives: Simin Tander (sister)

Mina Tander (born 4 December 1979) is a German actress. She played BfV agent Esther Krug on Berlin Station from 2016 to 2019.

== Biography ==
Born in Cologne, Tander is the daughter of an Afghan journalist father, who died when she was a child, and a German teacher mother.

She was raised in Cologne with her younger sister Simin Tander.

Tander is married to German film director Elmar Fischer. He directed Tander in his 2003 film Fremder Freund (Strange Friend), and in the 2009 episode "Die Kronzeugin" of Der Kriminalist (The Criminalist).

== Selected filmography ==
Year	Project	Role	Notes	Ref.
1995	Verbotene Liebe (Forbidden Love)	Lena Gassner	1 episode	
1996	Absprung (Bounce)		Television movie	
2000	Ants in the Pants	Leonie		
2000	No More School	Melanie		
2003	Fremder Freund (Strange Friend)	Julia		
2004	Tatort (Crime Scene)	Lisa	Episode: "Gefährliches Schweigen"	
2005	Oktoberfest	Katrin		
2006	Tatort (Crime Scene)	Martina Matussek	Episode: "Blutschrift"	
2006	F4: Vortex	Eva Keil	Television movie	
2008	At Any Second	Sara		
2009	Der Kriminalist (The Criminalist)	Tanja Sonntag	Episode: "Die Kronzeugin"	
2009	Wedding Fever in Campobello (Maria, ihm schmeckt’s nicht!)	Sara Marcipane		
2010	Zeiten ändern dich (Times Change You)	Bushido's Mother		
2010	Give Me Your Heart	Maria		
2012	Tatort (Crime Scene)	Sandra	Episode: "Ein neues Leben"	
2012	Forgotten (Du hast es versprochen)	Hanna		
2013	Buddy	Lisa		
2015	Frau Müller muss weg! (Ms. Muller Must Go Away)	Marina Jeskow		
2016	Seitenwechsel	Teresa Paschke		
2016	Antonio, ihm schmeckt's nicht (Antonio, He Doesn't Like It)	Sara Marcipane		
2016–2019	Berlin Station	Esther Krug		
2017	Eine gute Mutter (A Good Mother)	Greta Burmeester	Television movie	
2017–2018	Jerks	Mina Tander	2 episodes	
2018	Die Entdeckung der Liebe (The Discovery of Love)	Valerie	Television movie	
2018	Nord Nord Mord (North North Murder)	Susanna Wagner	Episode: "Clüver und der leise Tod"	
2025	Cassandra	Samira		

== Accolades ==
- 2009: Nomination – German Film Critics Award for Best Actress for Wedding Fever in Campobello (Maria, ihm schmeckt's nicht)
- 2014: Nomination – Jupiter Award for Best German Actress for Buddy
- 2017: Win – Jupiter Award for Best German Actress for Seitenwechsel
