= Simin Tander =

German musician

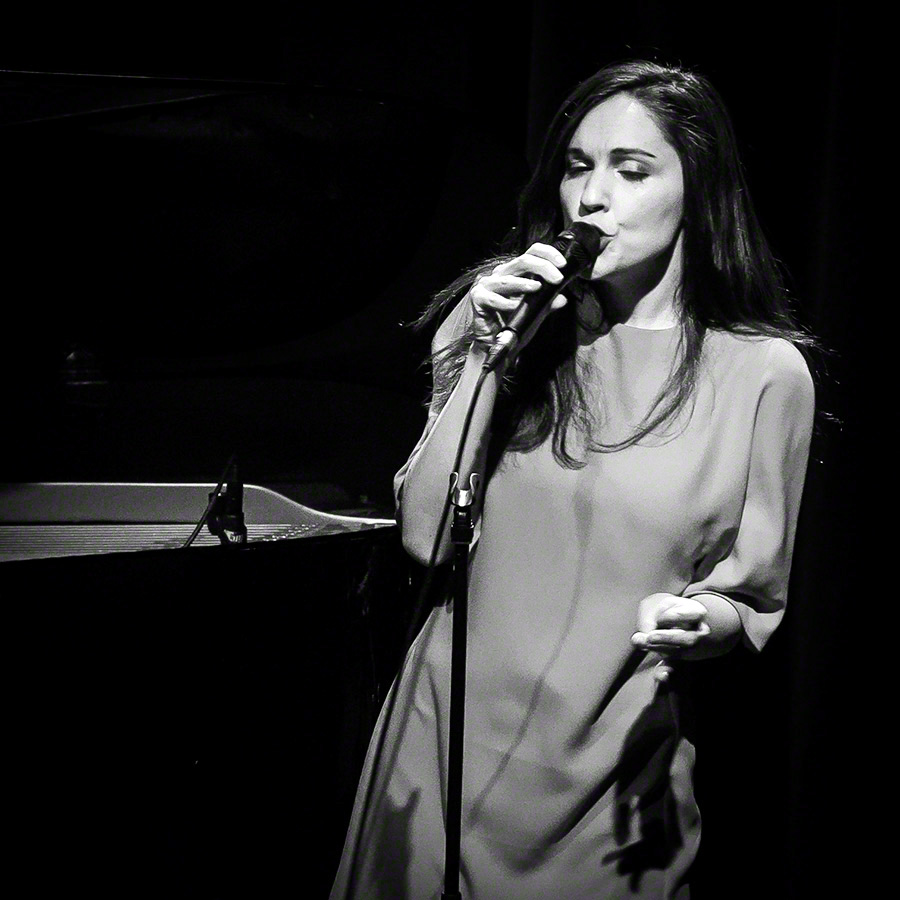
- Tander in 2016

Background information
- Born: 19 October 1980 (age 45); Cologne, West Germany
- Genres: Vocal jazz
- Occupations: Musician, composer
- Labels: ECM Records
- Website: simintander.com

Simin Tander (born 19 October 1980) is a German jazz musician (vocals and piano) and composer.

== Biography ==
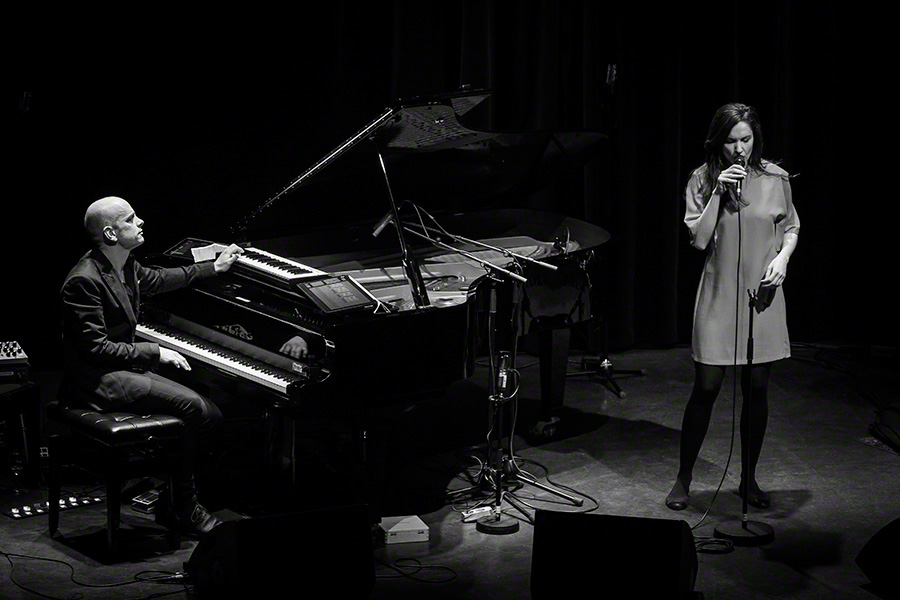
Tander with Tord Gustavsen at Vinterjazz 2016

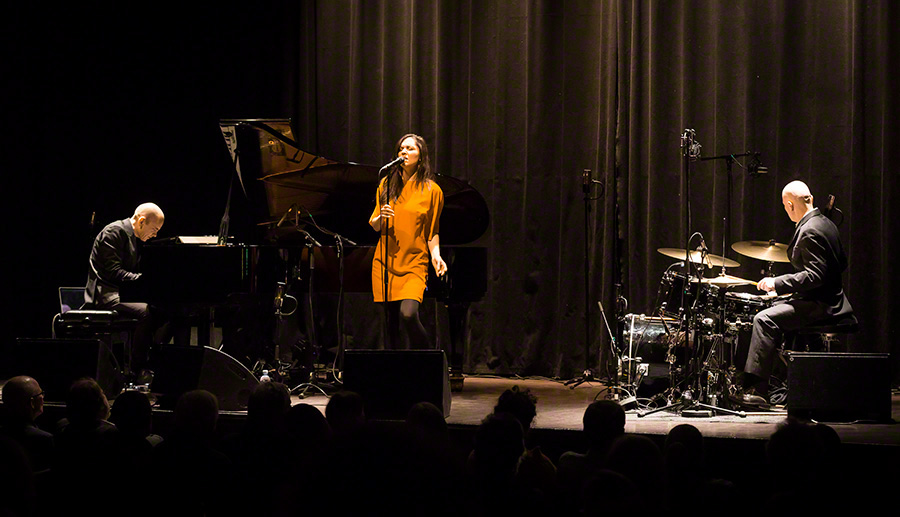
Tander with Gustavsen at Vinterjazz 2016

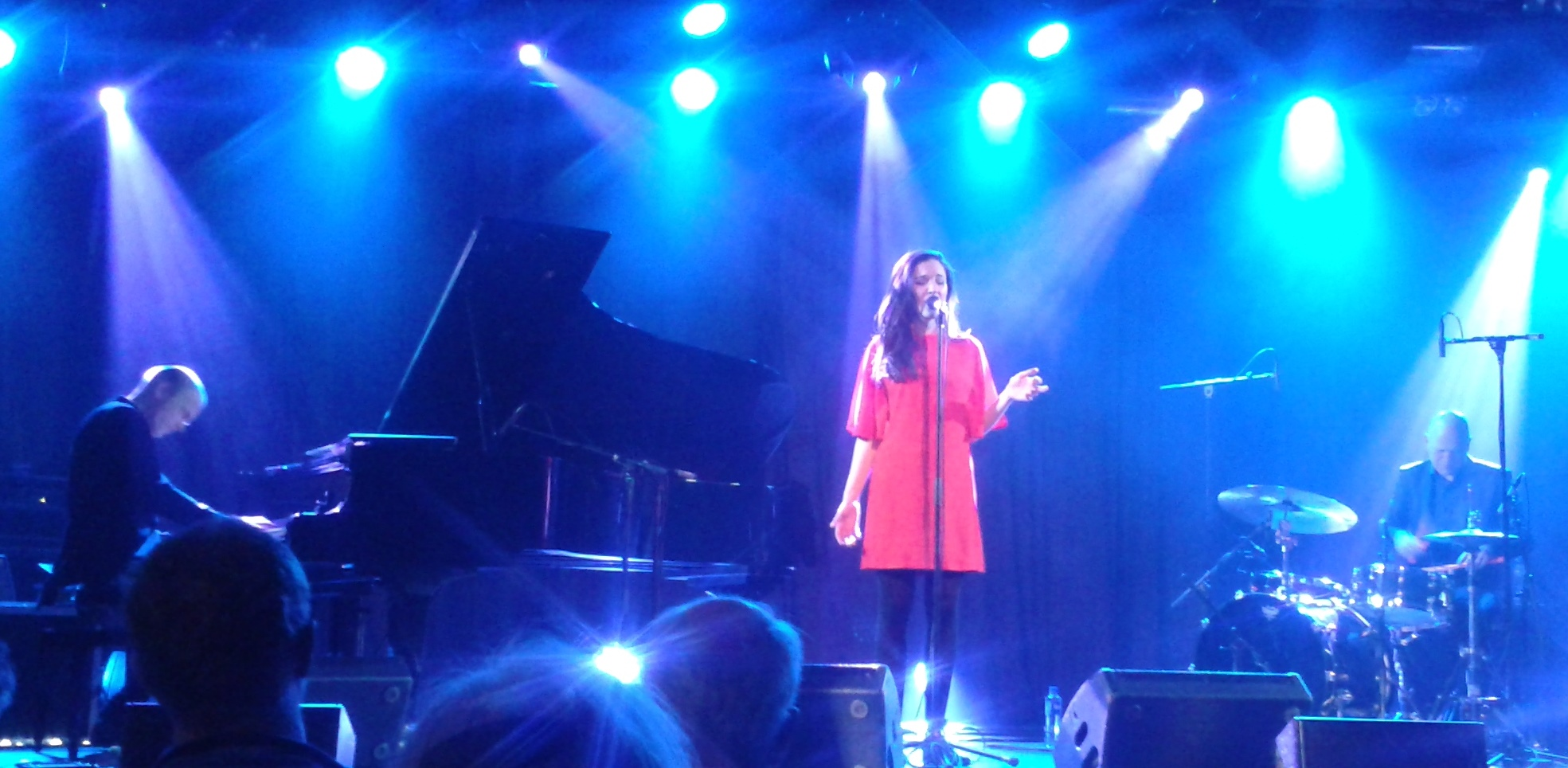
Tander with Gustavsen and Vespestad at Vossajazz 2016

Born in Cologne, Tander is the daughter of an Afghan journalist father, who died when she was a child, and a German teacher mother. She was raised in Cologne and her older sister Mina Tander became an actress. As Tander finished high school, she was very close to getting a board contract as pop singer. During her vocal training with an opera singer, she realized that she was more into vocal improvisation than the Classical singing. She attended piano lessons and founded her own band. From 2002, she studied jazz singing at the Conservatory ArtEZ in the Netherlands. There she graduated with a Master of Music in 2008. In the following years she played in the Netherlands with trumpeter Eric Vloeimans and with Bo van de Graaf's I Compani, where she made contributions for the albums Fellini (2004), Garbo and Extended 2013. In Germany she can be heard on soundtracks of the Tatort series and two episodes of the ZDF film Der Kriminalist.

She led her own Quartet to contributions on the Jeroen van Vliet (winners of the 2014 Boy-Edgar-Preis), Etienne Nillesen and Cord Heineking. With her Quartet she has released two albums and performed on international stages, such as the North Sea Jazz Festival, the Bohemia Jazz Festival (Czechia), the Catania Jazz Festival (Italy), the Madrid International Jazz Festival (Spain), the OCT LOFT Festival (China), the Hong Kong Jazz Festival and the Jarasum Jazzfestival (South Korea). Simin was also invited several times from UN Women Committee to represent Germany for international events and in June 2015 interpreted the UN Women-Song One Woman during the 20'th Beijing Conference.

She has collaborated with the Norwegian pianist Tord Gustavsen and drummer Jarle Vespestad since 2014, releasing the album What Was Said (2016). They performed at the 2016 Vossajazz in Norway. In addition, she contributes regularly to other projects, such as in 2015 to the TFF Rudolstadt with the 'Ruth ausgezeichnete Ensemble' Eurasians Unity under the direction of Caroline Thon, or Heiner Schmitz' Sins & Blessings. Since 2012, she has been a lecturer in jazz singing at Institut für Musik Osnabrück. She lives in Cologne.

== Discography ==
=== Solo albums ===
- 2011: Wagma (Neuklang)
- 2014: Where Water Travels Home (Jazzhaus Records)
- 2020: Unfading (Jazzhaus Records)

=== Collaborations ===
With David Golek

- 2011: Folk Tales from Another Land (Kululush Records)

With Hazel Leach's PLoTS

- 2012: Songs from the Edge (JazzHausMusik), with Tessa Zoutendijk, Esmée Olthuis, Laia Genc

With Tord Gustavsen and Jarle Vespestad

- 2016: What Was Said (ECM Records)
