= Silje Nergaard =

Norwegian jazz vocalist and songwriter (born 1966)

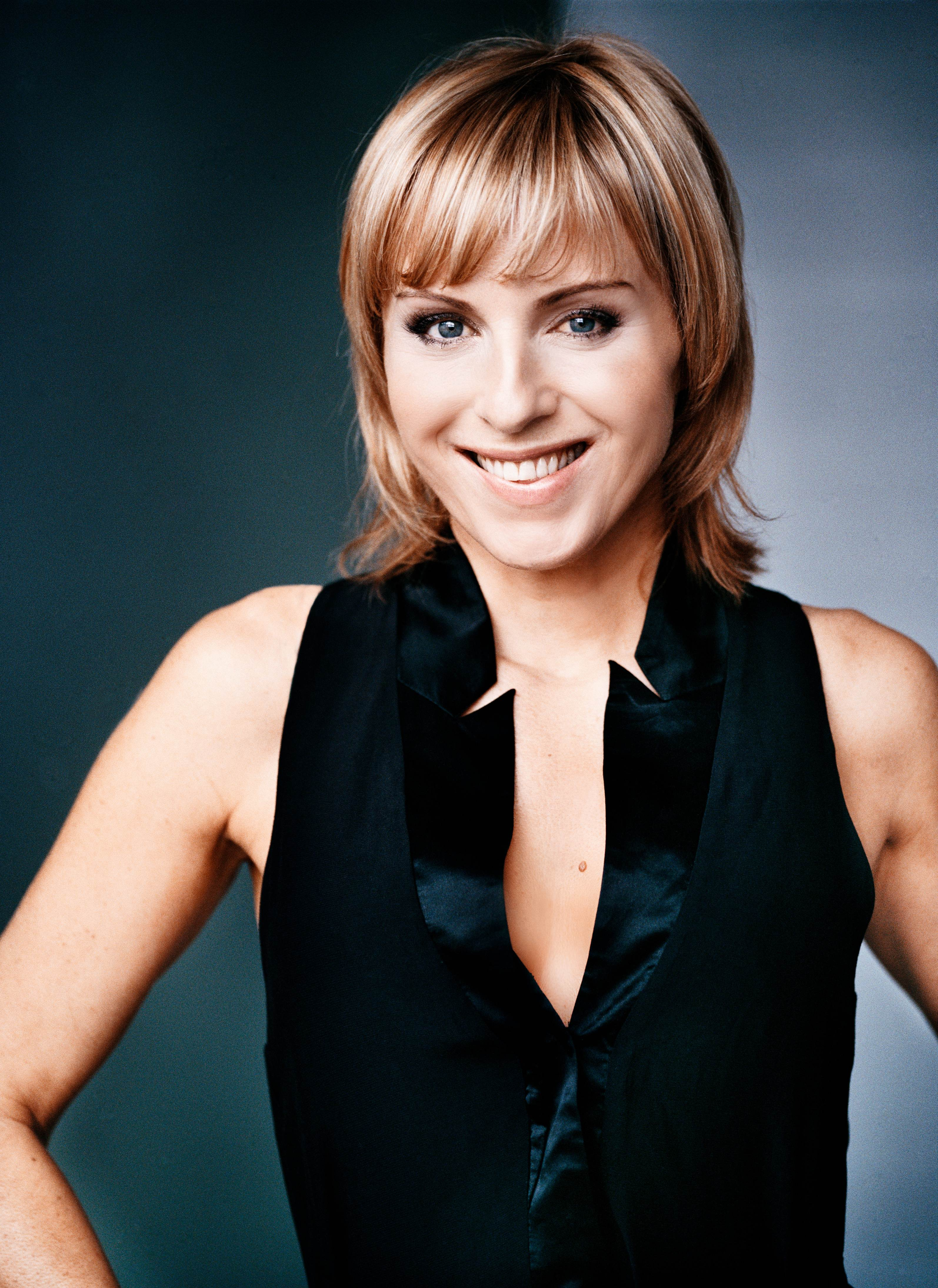
- Nergaard in Berlin, November 2011

Background information
- Born: 19 June 1966 (age 59); Steinkjer Municipality, Nord-Trøndelag, Norway
- Genres: Jazz, pop
- Occupations: Singer, songwriter
- Labels: EmArcy
- Website: www.siljenergaard.com

Silje Nergaard (born 19 June 1966) is a Norwegian jazz vocalist and songwriter. She is one of the best-selling jazz artists on the official sales chart in Norway. She became known worldwide after the release of the international bestseller Tell Me Where You're Going featuring Pat Metheny on guitar.

== Career ==
Nergaard entered the music scene at the age of 16 when she accidentally had a jam session with Jaco Pastorius Band in 1982. Her first hit single in 1990, "Tell Me Where You're Going" featuring guitarist Pat Metheny made it to no. 1 in Japan as well as top 10 in Norway and other countries. Her album At First Light (2001) is the best-selling Norwegian jazz album ever recorded and entered the official sales chart in Norway at No. 1 in its first week. The album A Thousand True Stories, which Nergaard recorded with the Metropole Orchestra in 2008, was a great success in both Europe and Asia. Nergaard is one of the few Norwegian artists to have been commercially released all around the globe, on most continents and major music markets including Japan, Brazil, Germany, the United States, and the United Kingdom.

Nergaard has recorded and performed songs with Al Jarreau, Pat Metheny, Toots Thielemanns, and Morten Harket of A-ha. She has had Tord Gustavsen and Jarle Vespestad as two pillars in her bands. Vince Mendoza received a Grammy Award Nomination for the Best Instrumental Arrangement Accompanying Vocalist(s) Award for the song "A Thousand True Stories" in 2011.

In the spring of 2012, Nergaard released her new album Unclouded, based on recordings with her two guitarists Hallgrim Bratberg and Håvar Bendiksen. It was released on 9 March in Norway and 23 March internationally. Nergaard has written 9 new songs for Unclouded and has two covers on this album: "Human" by The Killers and The Moon's a Harsh Mistress by Jimmy Webb. For Unclouded, Nergaard has also invited the American guitarist John Scofield to contribute along with Georg Wadenius, Knut Reiersrud, and Nils Petter Molvær.

== Personal life ==
She was married to Heine Totland from 1998 until 2022. They have two daughters and one son together.

== Discography ==
- Tell Me Where You're Going (Sonet, 1990)
- Silje (BMG, 1991)
- Cow On the Highway (Sonet, 1993)
- Brevet (Kirkelig Kulturverksted, 1995)
- Hjemmefra (Kirkelig Kulturverksted, 1996)
- Port of Call (EmArcy, 2000)
- At First Light (EmArcy, 2001)
- Nightwatch (EmArcy, 2003)
- Live in Koln (EmArcy)
- Darkness Out of Blue (EmArcy, 2006)
- A Thousand True Stories (Columbia, 2009)
- Jazz Divas of Scandinavia with DR Big Band (Red Dot, 2009)
- If I Could Wrap Up a Kiss (Sony 2010)
- Unclouded (Columbia/Sony, 2012)
- Chain of Days (Okeh, 2015)
- For You a Thousand Times (Okeh, 2017)
- Hamar Railway Station (2020)
- Japanese Blue (Okeh, 2020)
- Houses (Sony, 2021)
- Tomorrow We'll Figure Out The Rest (Sony, 2025)

Awards
Preceded by Röyksopp	Recipient of the Spellemannprisen as Spellemann of the Year; 2003	Succeeded by Odd Nordstoga
Preceded by Live Maria Roggen	Recipient of the Jazz Gammleng-prisen; 2005	Succeeded by Trygve Seim
