= Jarle Vespestad =

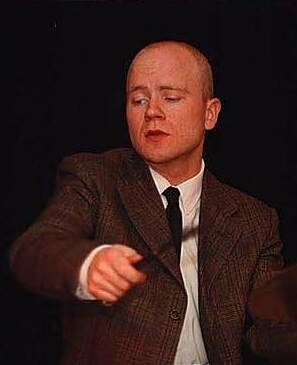

Background information
- Born: 16 April 1966 (age 60); Kirkenes, Finnmark
- Origin: Norway
- Genres: Jazz
- Occupations: Musician, composer
- Instruments: Drums, percussion
- Label: ECM Records
- Formerly of: Farmers Market; Tord Gustavsen Ensemble; Supersilent
- Website: www.farmers-market.net/bio/jarle-vespestad

Jarle Vespestad (born 16 April 1966) is a Norwegian jazz musician (percussion), the younger brother of jazz musician Liz Tove Vespestad, and a central member of Tord Gustavsen's projects.

== Career ==
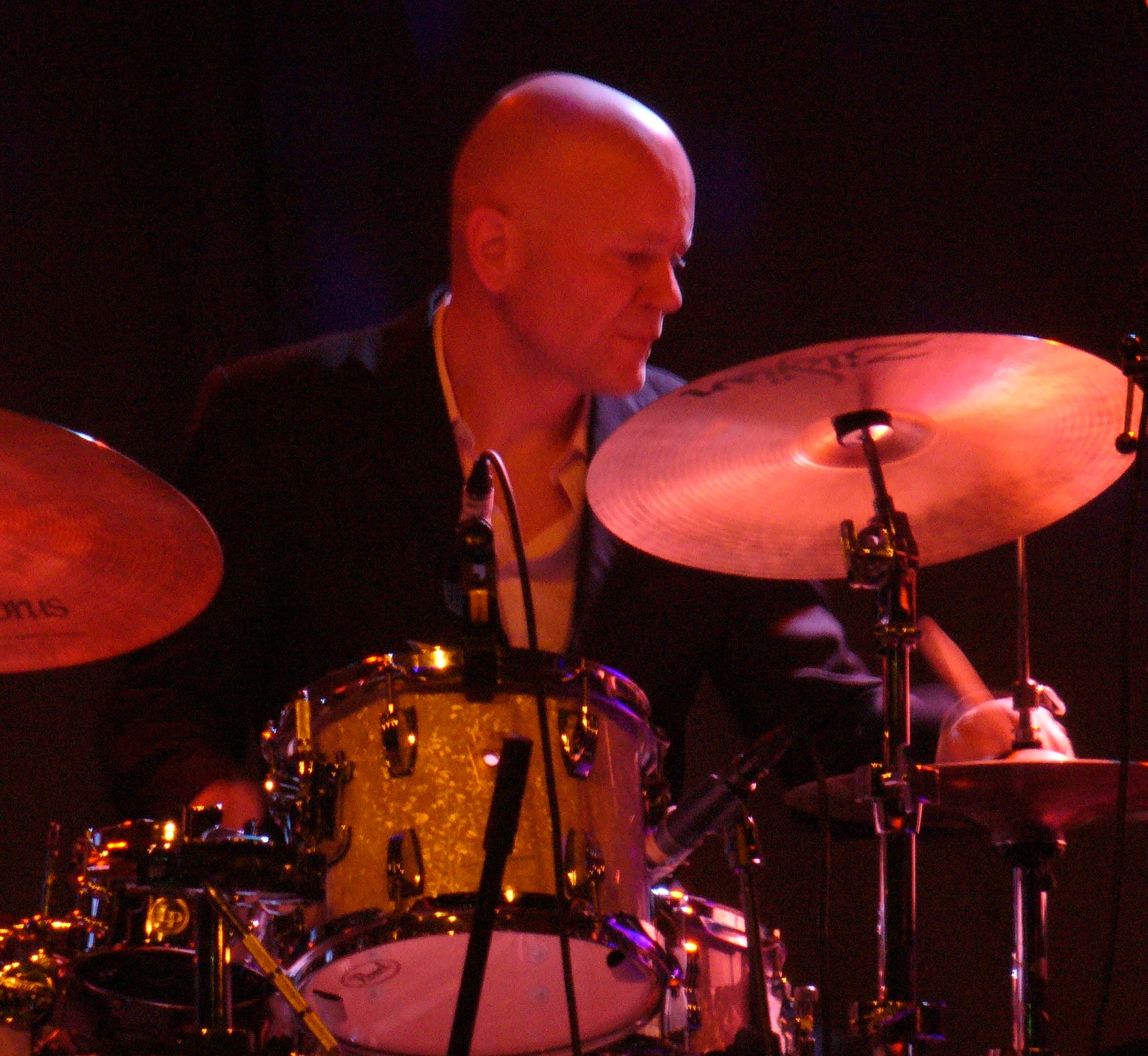
Jarle Vespestad at Vossajazz 2014.

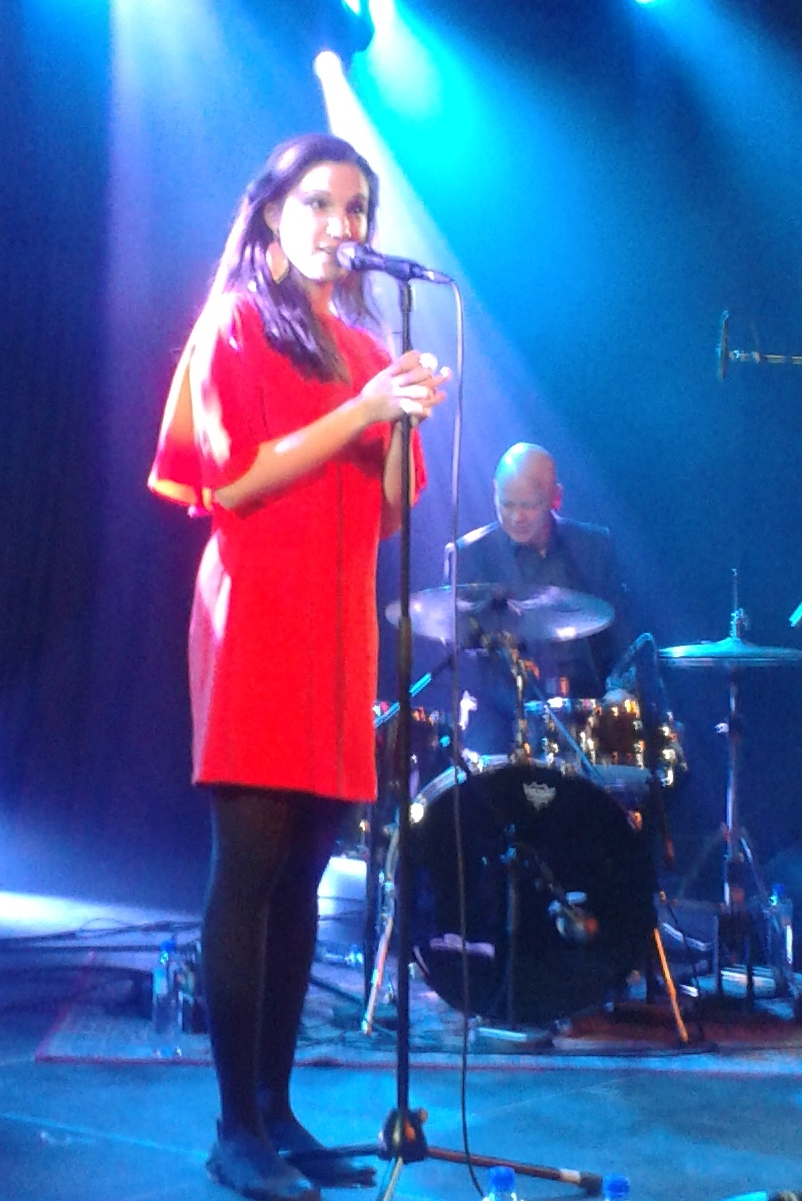
Vespestad with Simin Tander at Vossajazz 2016.

Vespestad was born in Kirkenes and picked up drumming in the local marching band, but drumming first became serious after finishing high school, where he found himself heading into a future as a substitute teacher at his local high-school. He made up his mind and graduated from the Toneheim Folk High School (1988) and Jazz program at Trondheim Musikkonservatorium (1990). In Trondheim he became the driving force behind many successful bands to come out of Trondheim the following years, like Veslefrekk, "Trondheim Kunstorkester", Farmers Market (1991–) and the Maria Kannegaard trio (1993–). In addition he was drummer with the Embla Nordic in Copenhagen.

In Oslo Vespestad has worked with different groups since 1996, releasing albums with Sigurd Køhn (More Pepper please) and Anders Jormin (Once) in 1996. He also cooperated with Silje Nergaard, Supersilent and Tord Gustavsen. He released the duo album Orbit (1998) and toured with Gustavsen's trio. For more than two decades he has been a leading drummer on the Norwegian jazz scene, within bands like Supersilent, Petter Wettre Trio and Quartet and Håvard Wiik Trio, in addition to Tord Gustavsen Trio, Silje Nergaard, Embla Nordic and Veslefrekk.

== Discography (in selection) ==
=== Solo albums ===
- 1998: Orbit (Curling Legs)

=== Collaborations ===
With Silje Nergaard

- 1990: Tell Me Where You're Going (EMI Records)
- 1991: Silje (Princess Records)
- 1993: Cow on the Highway (Sonet Records)
- 1995: Brevet (Kirkelig Kulturverksted)
- 1996: Hjemmefra – From Home (Kirkelig Kulturverksted)
- 2000: Port of Call (EmArcy)
- 2001: At First Light (EmArcy)
- 2003: Nightwatch (Universal Music)
- 2005: Be Still My Heart – The Essential (EmArcy), compilation
- 2005: Live in Koln (EmArcy)
- 2007: Darkness Out of Blue (EmArcy)
- 2009: A Thousand True Stories (Columbia Records)
- 2010: If I Could Wrap Up a Kiss (Sony Music)
- 2012: Unclouded (Columbia Records)

With Farmers Market

- 1995: Speed/Balkan/Boogie (Kirkelig Kulturverksted)
- 1997: Musikk fra Hybridene (Music from the Hybrids) (Kirkelig Kulturverksted)
- 2000: Farmers Market (Winter & Winter)
- 2008: Surfin' USSR' (Ipecac Recordings)
- 2012: Slav to the Rhythm (Division Records)

With Sigurd Køhn

- 1998: More Pepper please (Real Records)
- 1999: Woman's Got To Have It (Real Records)
- 2003: Angels (Real Records)

With Tord Gustavsen

- 2003: Changing Places (ECM)
- 2005: The Ground (ECM)
- 2007: Being There (ECM)
- 2012: The Well (ECM)
- 2014: Extended Circle (ECM)
- 2016: What Was Said (ECM)
- 2018: The Other Side (ECM)

With Roy Powell and Terje Gewelt

- 2003: Solace (Nagel Heyer Records)

With Jacob Young & Roy Powell

- 2011: Anthem (PVY Records)
