= Sildajazz =

Annual jazz festival in Haugesund, Norway

Sildajazz is a jazz festival, which is held annually on the second weekend of August, in Haugesund, Norway. The inaugural festival was in 1987 with four bands, and has since grown to involve around 70 bands and close to 400 Norwegian and foreign musicians spread over more than 200 events.

Both domestic and international artists participate at the festival and each year an award Sildjazzprisen is given to a Norwegian jazz musician or band.

The festival is named after the Norwegian word for herring (sild). The reason for this can be found in the rich fishing heritage of past days, and the influence that fishing had on the creation of the city of Haugesund itself.
