= Audun Erlien discography =

Norwegian musician

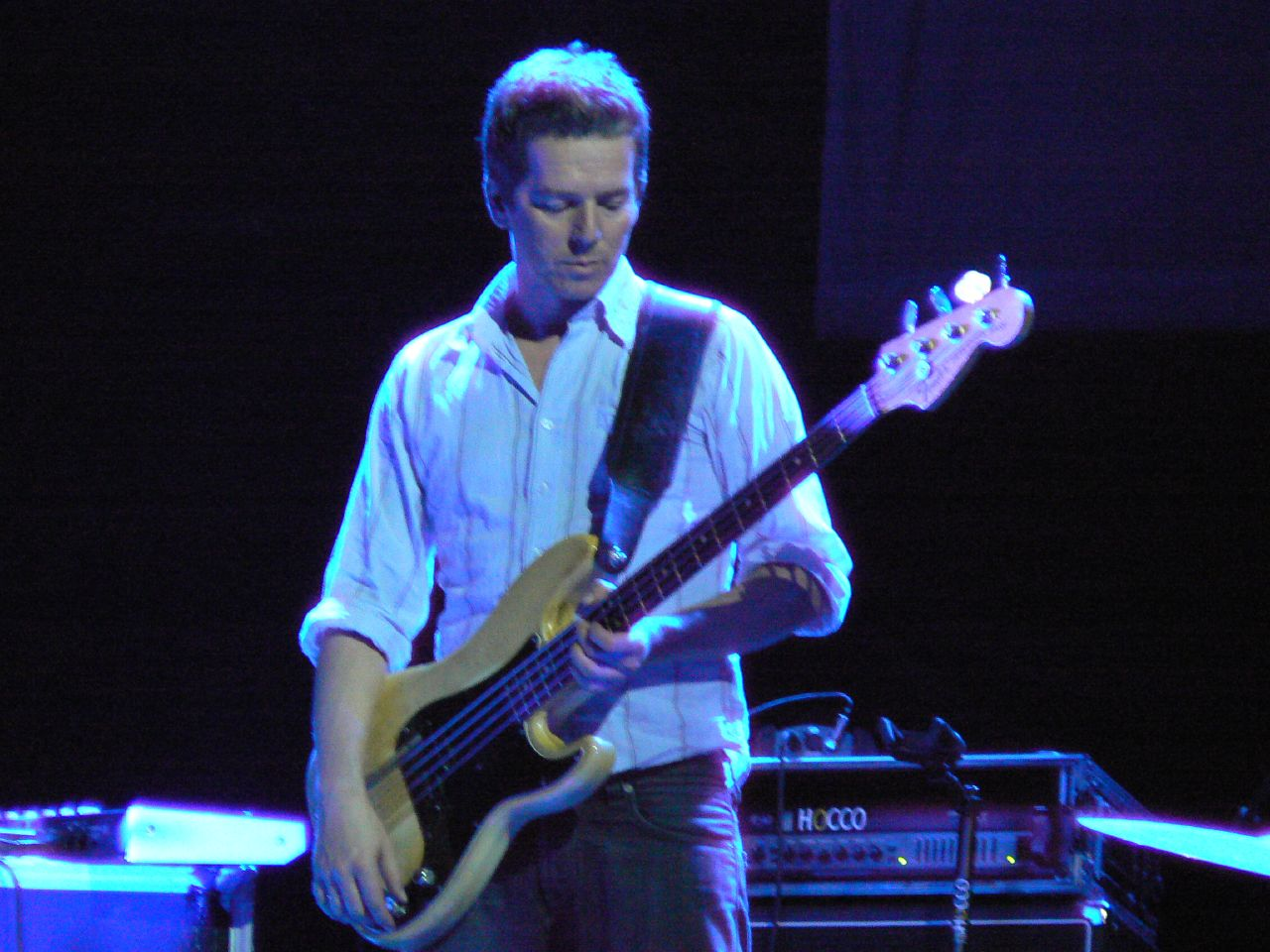
- Studio albums: 87
- Extended plays: 2
- Live albums: 13
- Compilation albums: 15

Audun Erlien (born 22 February 1967 in Oslo, Norway) is a Norwegian jazz musician (bass guitar, guitar and electronica).

Erlienhas released one solo album, and is also active in a long list of other ensembles, such as Karl Seglem's Sogn-A-Song, Øystein Sevåg's Global House Band and Eivind Aarset's Sonic Codex Orchestra.

== As performer ==
=== Within «Some Like It Hot» ===
- 1996: Mexico EP (Edel Records)
- 1996: Some Like It Hot (Edel Records)

=== With Karl Seglem ===
- 1997: Tya - frå Bor til Bytes (NorCD), with Reidar Skår
- 2004: New North (NorCD)

Within «Karl Seglem's Sogn-A-Song»

- 1990: Sogn-A-Song (NorCD)
- 1994: Rit (NorCD)
- 1998: Spir (NorCD), with Berit Opheim

=== With Silje Nergaard ===
- 1990: Tell Me Where You're Going (Lifetime Records)
- 1991: Silje (Princess Records/Lifetime Records)

=== With Ketil Bjørnstad ===
- 1991: Rift (Slager)

=== With Bendik Hofseth ===
- 1991: IX (Columbia Records)
- 1993: Amuse Yourself (Columbia Records)
- 1996: Planets, Rivers and...Ikea (Verve Forecast)
- 1998: Ligotage (ECM Records)
- 1999: Smilets historie (Sonet Gramofon), with additional Anders Engen, Eivind Aarset & Jan Bang
- 2009: XI (Grappa Music), with Olivier Louvel, Erlend Skomsvoll & Paolo Vinaccia

=== With Jan Eggum ===
- 1991: Underveis (Grappa Music)
- 1993: Nesten ikke tilstede (Grappa Music)
- 2001: Ekte Eggum (Grappa Music)
- 2005: 30/30 (Grappa Music)
- 2011: Kjærlighet og ærlighet 1 (Grappa Music)
- 2011: Kjærlighet og ærlighet 2 (Grappa Music)

=== With Anja Garbarek ===
- 1992: Velkommen inn (RCA, BMG Ariola)

=== With Knut Reiersrud ===
- 1993: Tramp (Kirkelig Kulturverksted)
- 1995: Klapp (Kirkelig Kulturverksted)
- 1998: Soul of a Man (Kirkelig Kulturverksted)
- 1999: Sub (Kirkelig Kulturverksted)
- 2001: Sweet Showers of Rain (Kirkelig Kulturverksted)
- 2004: Himalaya Blues (Kirkelig Kulturverksted)

=== With Øystein Sevåg ===
- 1993: Link (Windham Hill Records)
- 1999: Pearl Collection (Siddharta Records)
- 2005: Caravan (Siddhartha Records)

Within «Øystein Sevåg's Global House Band»

- 1995: Global House (Windham Hill Records)
- 2010: The Red Album (Siddhartha Spiritual Music)

=== With Anne Grete Preus ===
- 1997: Hvitt lys i natten (WEA)

=== With Nils Petter Molvær ===
- 2000: Solid Ether (ECM Records)
- 2001: Recoloured (ECM Records)
- 2002: NP3 (EmArcy Records)
- 2002: Live (Universal Music Norway), from Hamburg Jazzport Festival 2001
- 2004: Streamer (Sula Records)
- 2006: An American Compilation (Thirsty Ear Recordings)
- 2009: Hamada (Sula Records, Universal)

=== With Folk & Røvere ===
- 2000: Oslo (Sonet Grammofon)

=== With Jacob Young ===
- 2001: Glow (Curling Legs)

=== With Vidar Busk ===
- 2001: Venus Texas (Warner Music Norway)
- 2004: Love Buzz (Warner Music Norway)
- 2005: Starfish (Warner Music Norway)

=== With Ole Paus ===
- 2004: Klassefesten (Petroleum Records)
- 2004: En bøtte med lys (Petroleum Records)

=== With Dhafer Youssef ===
- 2006: Divine Shadows (Jazzland Records)
- 2008: Live at Cully Jazz Festival (Bootleg)

=== With Eivind Aarset & The Sonic Codex Orchestra ===
- 2007: Sonic Codex (Jazzland Records)
- 2010: Live Extracts (Jazzland Records)

=== With Mathias Eick ===
- 2008: The Door (ECM Records)
- 2010: Skala (ECM Records)

=== With Jarle Bernhoft ===
- 2008: Ceramik City Chronicles (Polydor Records/Universal Music Norway)
- 2010: 1: Man 2: Band (2010)
- 2011: Solidarity Breaks (Kikitepe Cassette)

=== Within Johan Sara jr. Group ===
- 2009: Orvos (Stierdna)

=== With Mathias Eick ===
- 2013: Skala (ECM Records)
- 2018: Ravensburg (ECM Records)

=== With Elly ===
- 2013: To Somewhere Peaceful (Elly Music)

=== With Spirit In The Dark ===
- 2016: Now Is The Time (Jazzland Recordings)

=== With other projects ===
- 1983 - Jahn Teigen: Harlequin (Polydor Records)
- 1983 - «Søstrene»: Chanson om Verdun
- 1985 - Lars Martin Myhre & «Søstrene»: Bak speilet (Phonofile)
- 1989 - «Lydia»: Dia
- 1991 - Danko/Fjeld/Andersen: Danko Fjeld Andersen (Mercury)
- 1992 - Deepika Thathaal: I alt slags lys (Kirkelig Kulturverksted)
- 1993 - Jonas Fjeld: Texas Jensen (Stageway Records)
- 1994 - Sissel Kyrkjebø: Innerst i sjelen (Mercury)
- 1994 - Frøydis Armand, Stein Mehren, Ketil Bjørnstad: For den som elsker (Kirkelig Kulturverksted)
- 1994 - Danko/Fjeld/Andersen: Ridin' on the Blinds (Grappa Music)
- 1994 - Anita Skorgan: Julenatt (Warner Music, Norway)
- 1995 - Vidar Johnsen: Cover Me (Phonofile)
- 1995 - Earl Wilson: Blues for All Seasons (EWP)
- 1997 - Ciwan Haco: Biluramin
- 1997 - Liz Tove Vespestad: Blackout (Sonet Grammofon)
- 1998 - Carsten Loly: Dusk (The Orchard)
- 1998 - Alex Rosén: In Person (Universal)
- 1998 - Grethe Svensen: Catwalk (Kirkelig Kulturverksted)
- 1999 - Kristin Skaare: Amoramora (Kirkelig Kulturverksted)
- 1999 - Lars Lillo Stenberg: The Freak (Sonet Grammofon)
- 1999 - Jonas Fjeld: Voice on the Water (Norsk Plateproduksjon)
- 2000 - May Britt Haug: Smil og vær gal! (Musico)
- 2000 - Lars Lillo-Stenberg: Oslo (Sonet Grammofon)
- 2001 - Danko/Fjeld/Andersen: One More Shot (BMG Norway)
- 2001 - Siri Christensen: Secret Room (Not On Label)
- 2001 - Anita Skorgan: Gull (Kirkelig Kulturverksted)
- 2001 - Lisa Bonnar: Under himmelen (LBC Records)
- 2002 - State: State (Universal Records)
- 2003 - Patrick Shaw Iversen & Raymond C. Pellicer: On/Off (Jazzland Records)
- 2003 - Michy Mano & Bugge Wesseltoft: The Cool Side of the Pillow (Enja Records)
- 2006 - Lars Lillo-Stenberg: Lars Lillo Stenberg synger Prøysen (2006)
- 2007 - Anne Grete Preus: Om igjen for første gang (2007)
- 2007 - Magnar Birkeland: Min elskede kom hjem igår
- 2007 - Mahsa Vahdat & Marjan Vahdat: Songs From a Persian Garden (Kirkelig Kulturverksted)
- 2008 - Kaia Huuse: Episoder
- 2008 - Ronnie Jacobsen: Stand Your Test in Judgement
- 2008 - Linn Skåber & Jacob Young: Magiske kroker & hemmeligheter
- 2010 - Unni Wilhelmsen: Delirium Park
- 2010 - Unni Wilhelmsen: 7
- 2011 - Luca Aquino: Chiara
- 2011 - Carsten Lindholm: Tribute
- 2011 - Anette Askvik: Liberty

=== With various artists ===
Tribut albums

- 1991: Buicken – store gutter gråter ikke (1991)
- 1994: Med blanke ark (1994)
- 1994: The Sweet Sunny North - Henry Kaiser & David Lindley in Norway (1994)
- 1999: Solide saker - en hyllest til DumDum Boys (Oh No!)
- 2001: Inn fra kulda - Bob Marley på norsk (2001)
- 2005: En hildringstime: 16 artister hedrer Erik Bye (2005)

Compilations and sampler records

- 2000: Suite for Sampler - ECM Selected Signs II (ECM Records)
- 2002: Verve Today 2002 (Verve)
- 2002: Stolpesko (Warner Music Norway)
- 2003: Nu Jazz (2003)
- 2004: Lullabies From the Axis of Evil (Kirkelig Kulturverksted)
- 2006 - Diverse artister: Verve Today 2006 (Verve)
- 2008: Songs Across of Separation ()
- 2009: Verve Today 2009 (Verve)
- 2010: Barnas supershow - Hytta vår ()

== As producer ==
- 2006 - Trond Granlund: Kommer tid, kommer råd (TG Records)
- 2012 - Hilde Heltberg: Elske det umulige - en samling av de beste sangene (Norskamerikaner), compilation

== See also ==
- Curling Legs
- NorCD
