= Reidar Skår =

Norwegian keyboardist and composer (born 1964)

- Born: 13 March 1964 (age 62); Øvre Årdal, Sogn og Fjordane, Norway
- Genres: Jazz, jazz fusion, electronic music, rock
- Occupations: Musician, composer, music producer
- Instrument: Keyboards
- Labels: ECM; Jazzland Recordings

Reidar Skår (born 13 March 1964 in Øvre Årdal, Sogn og Fjordane, Norway) is a Norwegian musician (keyboards), composer and music producer, known from several recordings and cooperations with the likes of Karl Seglem, Jacob Young, Arve Henriksen, Jarle Vespestad, Trygve Seim, Mats Eilertsen, Vigleik Storaas, Christian Wallumrød, Bendik Hofseth, Håkon Kornstad, Knut Reiersrud, Eivind Aarset, Wetle Holte, Arve Furset, Nils Petter Molvær, Nils-Olav Johansen, Mats Eilertsen, Christian Wallumrød and Paolo Vinaccia.

== Career ==
He resides and has a separate studio ("7. Etage") in Oslo, and has worked extensively with music for film and television. He has collaborated with Karl Seglem and Håkon Høgemo also from Årdal, on several albums, including the Tya, awarded the Edvard Prize 1998.

With Nils Petter Molvær he also played on Khmer (1997) together with Eivind Aarset, Ulf W. Ø. Holand, Morten Mølster, Roger Ludvigsen and Rune Arnesen. On Nils-Olav Johansen's album My Deal (2007), he played with Andreas Bye and Mats Eilertsen.

Skår contributed on Jacob Young's third solo album Glow (Curling Legs, 2001), where Arve Henriksen, Jarle Vespestad, Trygve Seim, Mats Eilertsen, Vigleik Storaas, Christian Wallumrød, Bendik Hofseth, Håkon Kornstad, Øyvind Brække, Knut Reiersrud and Audun Erlien were also in the lineup. He was in Eivind Aarset's Electronique Noire on the album Light Extracts (2001) with Wetle Holte (drums), Marius Reksjø (bass), Hans Ulrik (bass clarinet), Arve Furset (keyboards) and Nils Petter Molvær (trumpet).

With Knut Reiersrud he was in the lineup for the album Sweet Showers of Rain (2002) with Audun Erlien and Anders Engen from Nils Petter Molvær's band, Christian Wallumrød and Paolo Vinaccia.

== Honors ==
Edvard Prize 1998 for the album Tya (1997), with Karl Seglem

== Discography ==
As musician

- 1997: Tya – Frå Bror Til Bytes (NorCD), duo with Karl Seglem
- 1997: Khmer (ECM Records, 1997), within Nils Petter Molvær's Khmer
- 2001: Light Extracts (Jazzland Recordings), within Eivind Aarset's Electronique Noire
- 2001: Sweet Showers of Rain (Kirkelig Kulturverksted), with Knut Reiersrud
- 2001: Glow (Curling Legs), with Jacob Young

As producer

- Nils Petter Molvær: NP3 (EmArcy, 2002)
- Jon Eberson Trio: Bring It On (Jazzaway, 2006)
- The Indian Core: The Indian Core (Grappa Music, 2007)
- Crimetime Orchestra Feat. Sonny Simmons & KORK: Atomic Symphony (Jazzaway, 2009)
- Mungolian Jetset: We Gave It All Away... And Now We Are Taking It Back (Smalltown Supersound, 2009)
