= Light Extracts =

Studio album by Eivind Aarset
- Released: 2001
- Genre: Jazz
- Length: 52:04
- Label: Jazzland

Eivind Aarset chronology
Électronique Noire (1998)	Light Extracts (2001)	Connected (2004)

Light Extracts is an album by Norwegian guitarist Eivind Aarset's Électronique Noire.

== Background ==
This is the second solo album by the Norwegian guitarist Eivind Aarset for Bugge Wesseltoft's Jazzland label, and as a follow-up of the well received debut album Électronique Noire, it had much to live up to, and did not disappoint. Also this time ambience and club rhythms are present, but the music lives a life of itself and has become a truly separate organism. Light Extracts is an album from the top shelf.

AllMusic critique Thom Jurek, in his review of Aarset's album Light Extracts states:

... Basses rattle in the underpinned rhythmic center as Aarset's guitar plies a textural schema trying to get to and undo the fixed center of the track.
He loose-hands his way around the fretboard, playing against the rhythm and on top of it until everything gives way to some new form of musically crystalline darkness.
Light Extracts is light years ahead of everybody in this game and a few notches above his first effort. This is the cat to watch....

== Reception ==
The AllMusic reviewer Thom Jurek awarded the album 4.5 stars, and the reviewer Terje Mosnes of the Norwegian newspaper Dagbladet awarded the album dice 4.

Professional ratings
Review scores
Source	Rating
AllMusic	4.5/5 stars
Dagbladet	4/6 stars

== Track listing ==
1. «Empathic Guitar» (4:25)
2. «Wolf Extract» (8:20)
  Bass Clarinet – Hans Ulrik
  Electric piano – Arve Furset
3. «Dust Kittens» (5:26)
  Arranging (co-arranging) – Nick Sillito
4. «The String Thing» (7:40)
  Electric bass – Eivind Aarset
5. «Between Signal & Noise» (8:33)
  Bass clarinet – Hans Ulrik
  Electric piano – Arve Furset
6. «Ffwd / Slow Motion» (6:23)
7. «Self Defence» (4:33)
  Composer – Eivind Aarset, Marius Reksjø & Wetle Holte
8. «Tunnel Church» (6:44)
  Trumpet – Nils Petter Molvær

== Credits ==
- Drums, drum programming, electronics – Wetle Holte
- Electric bass, acoustic bass – Marius Reksjø (tracks: 1–3, 5–7)
- Electronics, mixing – Reidar Skår
- Guitar, fretless guitar, electronics, programming, edition – Eivind Aarset
- Mastering – Mikkel Schille
- Photography (cover photos) – Fin Serck-Hanssen
- Recording – Eivind Aarset & Reidar Skår
- Composer – Eivind Aarset (tracks: 1–6, 8)
- Cover design – www.kornstad.com

== Notes ==
- Recorded at 7 Etg. and at home
- Mastered at Lydmuren
