= Sonic Codex =

Studio album by Eivind Aarset
- Released: 2007
- Genre: Jazz
- Length: 57:50
- Label: Jazzland
- Producer: Eivind Aarset; Erik Honoré; Jan Bang

Eivind Aarset chronology
| Connected (2004) | Sonic Codex (2007) | Live Extracts (2010) |

Sonic Codex is an album by Norwegian guitarist Eivind Aarset.

== Background ==
This fourth solo album Sonic Codex from Norwegian guitarist Eivind Aarset incorporates concepts from his earlier albums, restates, elaborates and reinforces them to generate a genuine masterpiece, that might be a defining moment in both Aarset's career and the history of Jazzland. Sonic Codex puts forward rules of engagement that Aarset collaborate with the audience, and very deliberately quotes and redefines the musicality that made up his previous three albums, “Electronique Noire”, “Light Extracts”, and “Connected”, yet also points his way forward: it is an innovative present that simultaneously summarizes the past, and predicts the future.

== Reception ==
The review of the Norwegian newspaper Dagbladet awarded the album 4 stars (dice).

Professional ratings
Review scores
| Source | Rating |
|---|---|
| Dagbladet | 4/6 stars |

== Track listing ==
1. «Sign Of Seven» (6:26)
  Bass clarinet – Hans Ulrik
  Baritone guitar & celesta – Audun Erlien
2. «Quicksilver Dream» (6:23)
  Bass clarinet – Hans Ulrik
  Drums – Anders Engen
  Featuring (sample) – Punkt
3. «Dröbak Saray» (6:47)
  Synthesizer – Audun Erlien & Wetle Holte
4. «Cameo» (5:17)
  Celesta – Wetle Holte
5. «Still Changing» (8:11)
  Banjo – Tor Egil Kreken
  Organ (Wurlitzer), vocal sampler – Audun Erlien
  Synthesizer & piano – Wetle Holte
6. «Black Noise/White Silence» (3:06)
  Electric bass – Marius Reksjø
7. «Family Pictures III» (3:38)
  Electric bass – Eivind Aarset
  Sampler (field Recording), producer – Erik Honoré
  Sampler & producer – Jan Bang
8. «Sleeps With Fishes» (6:28)
9. «The Return Of Black Noise And Murky Lamabada» (11:34)
  Electric bass – Marius Reksjø

== Credits ==
- Acoustic bass – Marius Reksjø (tracks: 1–2, 8)
- Drums, percussion & programming – Wetle Holte
- Electric bass – Audun Erlien (tracks: 3–5)
- Guitars, kalimba, percussion (logdrum), programming, glockenspiel & additional recordings – Eivind Aarset
- Artwork – Stoffen Games
- Mastering – Thomas Eberger
- Mixing – Erik Honoré, Mike Hartung (tracks: 1, 5), Reidar Skår (tracks: 2, 6, 8–9), Ulf Holand (tracks: 3–4)
- Photography (cover) – Fin Sersk-Hanssen
- Photography (of Eivind Aarset) – Johannes Rodach
- Producer – Eivind Aarset, Erik Honoré (tracks: 7), Jan Bang (tracks: 7)
- Recording – Erik Honoré (tracks: 7), Espen Gundersen (tracks: 3–5), Mike Hartung (tracks: 1–2, 6, 8–9)
- Recording (clarinet & bass clarinet) – Pelle Fridell (tracks: 1–2, 5)

== Notes ==
- Sample on track 2 taken from "Body Language" appearing on the album "Crime Scenes"
- Track 1, 2, 6, 8 & 9 recorded at Propeller Studio
- Track 3 to 5 recorded at Audiopol
- Track 7 recorded at Punkt Studios
- Clarinet and bass clarinet recorded at Pelles room
- Additional recordings at Katakomben
- Track 1 & 5 mixed at Propeller Studio
- Track 3 & 4 mixed at Lydlab
- Track 2, 6, 8 & 9 mixed at 7 etg
- Track 7 mixed at Punkt Studios
- Mastered at Cutting Room, Stockholm
