= Solid Ether =

Studio album by Nils Petter Molvær
- Released: May 5, 2000
- Recorded: 1999
- Genre: Jazz
- Length: 50:42
- Label: ECM; ECM 1722
- Producer: Manfred Eicher

Nils Petter Molvær chronology
Khmer (1998)	Solid Ether (2000)	NP3 (2002)

Solid Ether is an album by Norwegian trumpeter, composer and producer Nils Petter Molvær, recorded in 1999 and released on ECM May the following year.

== Reception ==
On All About Jazz, Chris M. Slawecki called it "a stunning meltdown of classic jazz trumpet styles with modern techno, drum-and-bass and electronic music."

The AllMusic review by David R. Adler stated "Not everyone will "get" this kind of music, and die-hard jazzers might laugh it off as an inconsequential fad. But it's actually a seismic innovation that is just getting started."

Robert Christgau gave the album an A, noting, "He immerses in chaos and comes out beautiful."

Professional ratings
Review scores
Source	Rating
AllMusic	4/5 stars
Robert Christgau	A

== Track listing ==
All tracks are written by Nils Petter Molvær, except as noted

No.	Title	Writer(s)	Length
1.	"Dead Indeed"		7:30
2.	"Vilderness 1"		7:48
3.	"Kakonita"		4:59
4.	"Merciful 1"	Molvær; Sidsel Endresen	1:02
5.	"Ligotage"		6:43
6.	"Trip"		6:24
7.	"Vilderness 2"		4:56
8.	"Tragamar"		4:45
9.	"Solid Ether"		5:12
10.	"Merciful 2"	Molvær; Endresen	1:13
Total length:			50:42

== Personnel ==
- Nils Petter Molvær – trumpet, piccolo trumpet, electronic trumpet, synthesizer, bass, loops, electronics, sampler, effects, percussion, piano, synth-bass, vocoder trumpet, voice effects, beats, sound treatment
- Eivind Aarset – guitar, effects (tracks 1, 2 & 5–9)
- Audun Erlien – bass (tracks 2 & 5–9)
- Rune Arnesen, Per Lindvall – drums (tracks 2 & 5–9)
- DJ Strangefruit – electronics, sampler, voice, scratches (tracks 5, 6, 8 & 9)
- Sidsel Endresen – vocals (tracks 4 & 10)
