= Wibutee =

Norwegian jazz band

- Origin: Trondheim, Norway
- Genres: Jazz and electronica
- Years active: 1996–present
- Labels: Jazzland Recordings; Sonne Disk
- Members: Håkon Kornstad; Rune Brøndbo; Wetle Holte; Tor Egil Kreken
- Past members: Per Zanussi (1996–2004); Live Maria Roggen (1998–2000); Erlend Skomsvoll (1998–2000); Gulleiv Wee (2000–2002); Marius Reksjø (2004–2005)
- Website: Wibutee Official Website

Wibutee (initiated 1998 in Trondheim, originally a trio named Triangle 1996–98) is a jazz band from Norway, mixing influences from current electronic (dance) music, jazz rock and improvisation.

== Biography ==
Wibutee was originally formed as the jazz trio Triangle in Trondheim, Norway in 1996 by Håkon Kornstad, Wetle Holte and Per Zanussi, then jazz students at the Trondheim Musikkonservatorium. They were later joined by Erlend Skomsvoll and Live Maria Roggen, playing their first notable concert as a group at the Nattjazz festival in Bergen, May 1998. Signed to Bugge Wesseltoft's new label Jazzland, they released their first album in 1999, produced by Wesseltoft. From 2000 to 2001, Wibutee was also joined by ex-The September When bass player Gulleiv Wee on electronics. Roggen and Skomsvoll left the band in 2000. Pioneer in Norwegian electronica, Rune «Sternklang» Brøndbo joined the group in 2001, just before the release of their second album Eight Domestic Challenges. The pure instrumental album was produced by the band itself. The constellation continued through 2004, releasing Playmachine in June 2004. Per Zanussi left Wibutee in October 2004. The bass chair was then taken by Marius Reksjø, finally by Tor Egil Kreken. Wibutee was working towards a more melodic concept than before, but still with Kornstad's easily recognisable tenor saxophone in front. In early 2006 Wibutee launched their own label Sonne Disk with their following album Sweet Mental.

== Current members ==
Standard lineup

- Håkon Kornstad (saxophone, flutes, flutonet, melodica, electronics, vocals, programming)
- Rune «Sternklang» Brøndbo (electronics, guitar, keyboards, programming)
- Wetle Holte (drums, programming)

On stage

- Tor Egil Kreken is added playing electric bass, guitars and banjo.

== Discography ==
- 1998: Newborn Thing (Jazzland), feat. Live Maria Roggen
- 2001: Eight Domestic Challenges (Jazzland)
- 2004: Playmachine (Jazzland)
- 2006: Sweet Mental (Sonne)
