= Paolo Vinaccia =

Italian jazz drummer (1954–2019)

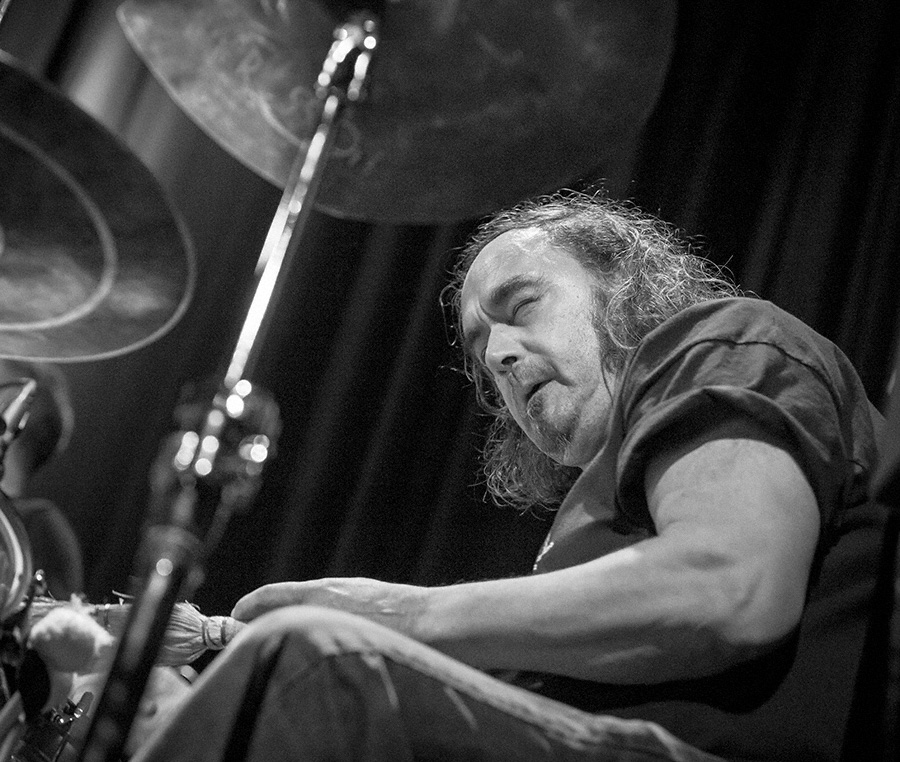
- Paolo Vinaccia at Cosmopolite Scene in Oslo, 2016

Background information
- Born: 27 March 1954; Camerino (Mc)Italy
- Died: 5 July 2019 (aged 65)
- Genres: Jazz
- Occupation: Musician
- Instrument: Drums

Paolo Vinaccia (Camerino, 27 March 1954 – Oslo, 5 July 2019) was an Italian jazz drummer who lived in Norway. He died on 5 July 2019 after almost ten years of living with pancreatic cancer.

== Career ==
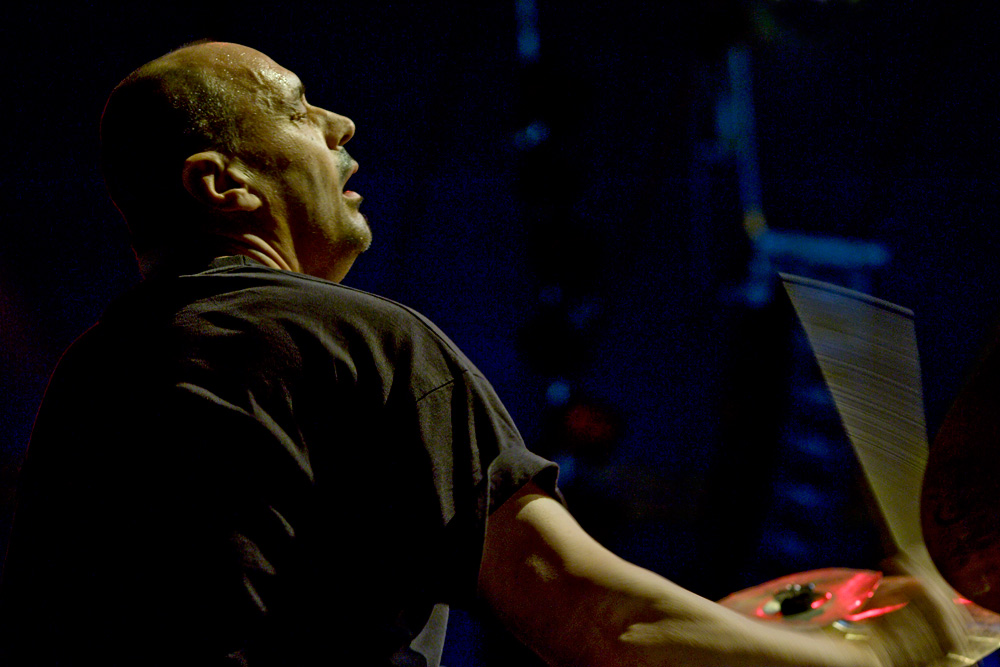
Paolo Vinaccia at Moers festival 2010

Vinaccia worked with Terje Rypdal, Bendik Hofseth, Jan Eggum, Knut Reiersrud (in Four Roosters), Gisle Torvik, Ole Amund Gjersvik and Jonas Fjeld. He has toured and recorded with Palle Mikkelborg, Mike Mainieri, Jon Christensen and David Darling. With Arild Andersen, he performed at the London Jazz Festival in 2008. Vinaccia contributed to more than 100 albums.

== Discography ==
=== As leader ===
- Mbara Boom (Sonet/EmArcy, 1997)
- Very Much Alive (Jazzland, 2010)
- Elastics with Ole Mathisen, Per Mathisen (Losen, 2011)
- Dommedag Ifolge (Paulus, 2017)
- Rathkes Gate 12:21:58 (Oslo Session, 2017)

With Arild Andersen

- Live at Belleville (ECM, 2008)
- Mira (ECM, 2014)
- In-House Science (ECM, 2018)

=== As sideman ===
With Arild Andersen

- Arv (Kirkelig Kulturverksted, 1994)
- Kristin Lavransdatter (Kirkelig Kulturverksted, 1995)
- Hyperborean (ECM, 1997)
- Electra (ECM, 2005)

With Maj Britt Andersen

- Folk Er Rare! (Barneselskapet 1986)
- Tida Gar Sa Altfor (Barneselskapet 1987)
- Tamme Erter Og Villbringebaer (Norsk, 1990)
- Kjaertegn (Norsk, 1992)
- Rippel Rappel (Grappa, 1994)
- Dorstokken Heme (Grappa, 2004)
- Landsbybarna I Bawatele (Barnemusikken 2012)

With Jon Eberson

- Pigs and Poetry (CBS, 1987)
- Backhand smash! (Hot Club, 1989)
- Thirteen Rounds (Curling Legs, 1997)

With Jan Eggum

- Underveis (Grappa, 1991)
- Nesten Ikke Tilstede (Grappa, 1993)
- Kjaerlighet & AErlighet 2 (Grappa, 2011)
- Kjaerlighet & AErlighet 3 (Grappa, 2011)

With Bendik Hofseth

- Amuse Yourself (Columbia, 1993)
- Metamorphoses (Sonet, Verve 1995)
- Planets, Rivers and...Ikea (Verve Forecast, 1996)
- Ludo (Kirkelig Kulturverksted, 1997)
- Itaka (Grappa, 2005)
- Children & Cosmopolitans (JazzCode, 2015)
- Atonement (C+C, 2018)

With Anne Grete Preus

- Lav Sol! Hoy Himmel (WEA, 1989)
- Og Hosten Kommer Tidsnok (WEA, 1991)
- Hvitt Lys I Natten (Warner, 1997)

With Knut Reiersrud

- Klapp (Kirkelig Kulturverksted, 1995)
- Soul of a Man (Kirkelig Kulturverksted, 1998)
- Sub (Kirkelig Kulturverksted, 1999)
- Tramp (Kirkelig Kulturverksted, 1993)

With Terje Rypdal

- Skywards (ECM, 1997)
- Vossabrygg (ECM, 2006)
- Crime Scene (ECM, 2010)

With Oystein Sevag

- Link (Siddhartha Spiritual Music, 1993)
- Caravan (Siddhartha Spiritual Music, 2005)
- The Red Album (Siddhartha Spiritual Music, 2010)

With Bugge Wesseltoft

- New Conception of Jazz: Moving (Jazzland, 2001)
- New Conception of Jazz Live (Jazzland, 2003)
- New Conception of Jazz: Film Ing (Jazzland, 2004)
- New Conceptions of Jazz (Jazzland, 2008)

With others

- Ab und Zu, Ab und Zu (EMI, 1989)
- Forente Artister, Sammen for Livet (Forente Artister, 1985)
- Lars Fredrik Beckstrom, Lykkens Kalosjer (Rodelokka Grammofon, 1997)
- Beady Belle, Lose & Win (Universal, 2001)
- Kirsten Braten Berg, Syng Du Mi Royst (Grappa, 2001)
- Sondre Bratland, Rosa Fra Betlehem (Kirkelig Kulturverksted, 1991)
- Sondre Bratland, Atterklang (Kirkelig Kulturverksted, 1996)
- Kari Bremnes, Løsrivelse (Kirkelig Kulturverksted, 1993)
- Alf Cranner, Kafe Kaos (Tylden, 1995)
- Sigvart Dagsland, Bedre Enn Stillhet (Kirkelig Kulturverksted, 1992)
- deLillos, Varme Mennesker (Sonet, 1991)
- Di Derre, Den Derre Med Di Derre (Sonet, 1993)
- Elg, The Way Life Goes (Hit Songs, 2004)
- Eriksen, The Water Is Wide (RCA, 1994)
- Jonas Fjeld, Svært Nok for Meg (EMI, 1989)
- Jonas Fjeld, Texas Jensen (Stageway, 1993)
- Gitarkameratene, Typisk Norsk (Grappa, 2010)
- Haakon Graf, Grafitti (Uniton, 1987)
- Trond Granlund, Arbeidersanger Trond (Granlund, 2017)
- Ciwan Haco, Duri (Ses, 1994)
- Ciwan Haco, Bilura Min (Kom Muzik, 1997)
- Mattis Haetta, Maze Jar'galaed'dji (Daenos & Tana 1983)
- Randi Hansen, AE Undres (NorDisc, 1981)
- Morten Harket, Wild Seed (Warner Bros., 1995)
- Kine Hellebust & Anders Rogg, Fra Innsida (Big Hand, 1984)
- Hilde Heltberg, Pa Bare Bein (Studio B 1983)
- Helge Iberg, Never Ending West Side Story (Kirkelig Kulturverksted, 1997)
- Helge Iberg, A Musical Offering (Odin, 2017)
- Henry Kaiser & David Lindley, The Sweet Sunny North (Shanachie, 1994)
- Henry Kaiser & David Lindley, The Sweet Sunny North Vol. 2 (Shanachie, 1996)
- Iver Kleive, Kyrie (Kirkelig Kulturverksted, 1994)
- Iver Kleive, Juleevangeliet (Kirkelig Kulturverksted, 1998)
- Olga Konkova, My Voice (Losen, 2010)
- Tommy Korberg, Stilla Natt Norske Gram (EMI, 2000)
- Herborg Krakevik, Mi Haugtussa (Norsk, 1995)
- Jon Larsen, Guitaresque (Hot Club, 1994)
- Lars Lillo-Stenberg, The Freak (Sonet, 1999)
- Erlend Loe, Antons Villfaring (Grappa, 2002)
- Geirr Lystrup, Sommar I September (Juni, 1992)
- Mike Mainieri, Northern Lights (NYC, 2006)
- Matchstick Sun, Itchy Bitchy (RCA, 1990)
- Andrew Matheson, Night of the Bastard Moon (MCA, 1994)
- Katja Medboe, Prov a Sette Vinger Pa En Stein (Kirkelig Kulturverksted, 1997)
- Marlui Miranda, 2 IHU Kewere: Rezar (ACT, 1997)
- Nils Petter Molvaer, Re-Vision (EmArcy/Universal, 2008)
- Mungolian Jet Set, Beauty Came to Us in Stone (Jazzland, 2006)
- Lillebjorn Nilsen, Original Nilsen (Studio B 1982)
- Steinar Ofsdal, Vestenfor Mane (Slager, 1989)
- Hildegunn Oiseth, Hildring (MTG Music 2009)
- Oslo Gospel Choir, Credo (Master Music 2009)
- Ole Paus, Svarte Ringer (EMI, 1982)
- Ole Paus, Grensevakt (EMI, 1984)
- Kjetil Saunes, Lystyv (Norsk, 1993)
- Kenneth Sivertsen, Remembering North (NORCD, 1993)
- Ferenc Snétberger, Nomad (Enja, 2005)
- Tassili, Latebkish (ta:lik 2009)
- Terje Tonnesen, Attack! (Victoria, 1994)
- Lynni Treekrem, Ut I Vind (Columbia, 1991)
- Vamp, Horisonter Major (Selskapet, 1994)
- Gone at Last, Still Out There (Headwind Records, 1994)
