= Kjetil Saunes =

Norwegian musician and composer (born 1962)

- Born: 22 October 1962 (age 63); Ulsteinvik, Møre og Romsdal
- Origin: Norway
- Genres: Pop, Rock
- Occupations: Musician, composer
- Instrument: Bass guitar
- Labels: Jazzland, Kirkelig Kulturverksted, Grappa Music
- Website: Official website

Kjetil Saunes (born 22 October 1962 in Ulsteinvik, Norway) is a Norwegian musician (bass), composer and songwriter raised in, and still residing in, Oslo. He is known from a series of album releases and collaborations with musicians like Bjørn Eidsvåg, Ketil Bjørnstad, Kjetil Bjerkestrand, Eivind Aarset, Morten Harket and Unni Wilhelmsen.

== Career ==
Saunes started his musical career as 19 years old, in a band including Kjetil Bjerkestrand, Anders Viken and Eivind Aarset. His main instrument is the bass. He later worked as a studio musician and arranger, next to his own solo career. In the 80s he played with the KGB, a Christian rock band from Hamar. In addition he has collaborated with artists like Marius Müller, The Cardigans, Ketil Bjørnstad and Unni Wilhelmsen. Saunes has released four solo albums with his own music, lyrics, production and the bulk of the gameplay itself. The music can be characterized as intricate and well produced pop music, with well-written and poetic lyrics in Norwegian.

== Discography ==
=== Solo albums ===
- 1993: Lystyv (Grappa Music), with Eivind Aarset, Paolo Vinaccia, Per Hillestad, Bugge Wesseltoft, Nils Petter Molvær & Elisabeth Moberg
- 1996: Fyr (Grappa Musikk)
- 1999: Arkana (Grappa Musikk)
- 2008: Måne Blek (Grappa Musikk)

=== Collaborations ===
- 1992: Til Alle Tider (Norsk Plateproduksjon), with Bjørn Eidsvåg
- 1993: Poetenes Evangelium (Kirkelig Kulturverksted), with Morten Harket
- 1997: Reisetid (September), with Ketil Bjørnstad including Eldbjørg Raknes, Petronella Barker & Henrik Mestad
- 1998: Électronique Noire (Jazzland, EmArcy), with Eivind Aarset
- 2001: Syng Du Mi Røst (Grappa musikk), with Kirsten Bråten Berg
- 2003: Hurricane's Eye (St. Cecilia Music), with Unni Wilhelmsen
