= Arve Furset =

Norwegian composer and jazz musician

- Born: Arve Eilif Furset; 5 December 1964 (age 61); Askvoll Municipality, Sogn og Fjordane, Norway
- Origin: Norway
- Genres: Jazz, rock
- Occupations: Musician, composer
- Instruments: Piano, keyboards
- Labels: Odin, Jazzland

Arve Eilif Furset (born 5 December 1964 in Askvoll Municipality, Western Norway) is a Norwegian composer, jazz musician (piano, keyboards) and music producer, known from a series of record releases and cooperations with the likes of Ernst-Wiggo Sandbakk, Kjersti Stubø, Elin Rosseland, Johannes Eick, Vigleik Storaas, Jostein Hasselgård, Eivind Aarset, and Norma Winstone.

== Career ==
Furset studied music at Trondheim Musikkonservatorium (1983–85), and was a member of bands like the Bodega Band (1985–89), Saz Semai (1986–87), and Ernst-Wiggo Sandbakk & The Sympathy Orchestra (1989–90). He also worked regularly with bands like the quintet First Set, with whom he performed at festivals in Lillehammer, Vossajazz and Moldejazz, the trio Konerne ved Vandposten and Orleysa. Since 1999, he toured with Eivind Aarset's band Électronique Noire. In the late 1990s he also worked with pop musicians like the band Flava to da bone and Lynni Treekrem.

Furset was orchestra leader and composer of Trøndelag Teater and participated in more than thirty of the ensembles tours. Later he worked at the Sentralteateret and in Oslo Nye Teater and worked as a composer, arranger and composer for the big Saturday night shows on NRK1. He now works as a music producer in the field of dance music, World Music and electropop, and teaches keyboards and electronical music at the "Nordisk Institutt for Scene og Studio" (NISS). He composed and produced two songs for the Norwegian Eurovision Song Contest, and the title I'm Not Afraid To Move On, sung by Jostein Hasselgård was the winner in the Norwegian finale, and 4th in the international finale.

== Entries in the Eurovision Song Contest ==
- "I'm Not Afraid To Move On" by Jostein Hasselgård, Norway (Eurovision Song Contest 2003), 4th place

== Entries in national Eurovision pre-selections ==
- "Good Evening, Europe!" by Birgitte Einarsen (Norway 2003), 3rd place
- "Velvet Blue" by Kathrine Strugstad (Norway 2005)

== Discography ==
Within Orleysa

- 1991: Orleysa (Odin Records)
- 1993: Svanshornet (Odin Records)

Other projects

- 1987: Bodega Band Vol. IV
- 1992: Going, with First Set
- 1992: Far to go, with Fair Play & Norma Winstone
- 1998: Sympathetic, with Ernst-Wiggo Sandbakk & The Sympathy Orchestra
- 2001: Light Extracts (Jazzland Records), within Eivind Aarset's Électronique Noire
- 2001: Oofotr II Heilo catalog on Grappa Music, featured by Oofotr
