= Marius Reksjø =

Norwegian jazz upright bassist

- Born: Marius Julian Reksjø; 3 October 1973 (age 52); Horten, Vestfold
- Origin: Norway
- Genres: Jazz
- Occupation: Musician
- Instrument: Upright bass
- Label: Jazzland
- Website: www.groove.no/artist/38446276/marius-reksjo

Marius Julian Reksjø (born 3 October 1973 in Horten, Norway) is a Norwegian jazz musician (upright bass), known from cooperation within Bugge Wesseltoft's Jazzland Community and the band Beady Belle with his wife Beate S. Lech.

== Career ==
Reksjø studied music at the University of Oslo, was first bassist of the group Insert Coin. He was known from collaboration within Eivind Aarset's band Electronique Noir, on whose album Light Extracts (2001) he played, and with Bugge Wesseltoft he released the albums Moving (2001) and Jazzland Community 2007. With the Bobby Hughes Combination he recorded the album Nhu Golden Era on (2002). He also appeared with the Danish rock band The Savage Rose, and the singer-songwriter Jan Eggum on the albums Deilig (1999) and 30/30 (2005). He teaches bass at the "Høgskolen i Staffeldtsgate".

With his wife, the singer Beate S. Lech he formed the band Beady Belle in 1999. Their debut album Home (2001) was followed by the albums Cewbeagappic (2004), Closer (2005) and Belvedere (2008).

== Discography ==
Within Beady Belle

- 2001: Home (Jazzland)
- 2003: Cewbeagappic (Jazzland)
- 2005: Closer (Jazzland)
- 2008: Belvedere (Jazzland), includes duets with India Arie Simpson and Jamie Cullum
- 2010: At Welding Bridge (Jazzland)

With Jan Eggum

- 1999: Deilig (Grappa Music)
- 2005: 30/30 (Grappa Music)

With Bugge Wesseltoft

- 2001: Moving (Jazzland)
- 2007: Jazzland Community (Jazzland)

With Bobby Hughes Combination

- 2002: Nhu Golden Era

With "Folk og Røvere"

- 2002: Bagateller (Voices Music & Entertainment)
- 2003: Sommer Hele Året: 96-04 (Voices Music & Entertainment), compilation

With Eivind Aarset

- 2001: Light Extracts (Jazzland)
- 2004: Connected (Jazzland)
- 2007: Sonic Codex (Jazzland)

With Beate S. Lech

- 2011: Min song og hjarteskatt (Kirkelig Kulturverksted)
