= Khmer (album) =

Studio album by Nils Petter Molvær
- Released: 1998
- Recorded: 1996–97
- Studio: Lydlab A/S; Oslo, Norway
- Genre: Nu jazz
- Length: 42:44
- Label: ECM; ECM 1560
- Producer: Manfred Eicher, Ulf W.Ø. Holand

Nils Petter Molvær chronology
| Hastening Westwards (1998) | Khmer (1998) | Solid Ether (2000) |

Khmer is an album by Norwegian trumpeter, composer and producer Nils Petter Molvær recorded between 1996–1997 and released on ECM in 1998.

== Recording and production ==
The album mixes elements of electronica and jazz.

The album is based on sampled and artificially generated sounds, backed by beats from house and drum'n'bass. However, the often very slow rhythms are played on acoustic drums.

== Reception ==
Christian Genzel of AllMusic review awarded the album 4.5 stars. He wrote, "Khmer is surely the most unusual album ever released by ECM" due to the CD's then-unprecedented mix of jazz and electronica.

Professional ratings
Review scores
| Source | Rating |
|---|---|
| AllMusic | 4.5/5 stars |

== Track listing ==
1. "Khmer" (4:59)
2. "Tløn" (7:52)
3. "Felles spor" (5:50)
  - "Access"
  - "Song of Sand I"
4. "On Stream" (5:01)
5. "Platonic Years" (6:33)
6. "Phum" (3:39)
7. "Song of Sand II" (6:10)
8. "Exit" (2:42)

== Credits ==
- Nils Petter Molvær – trumpet (tracks 1–7), bass (tracks 2–5, 7), sampler (all tracks), percussion (sampler) (tracks 1, 8), guitar (tracks 3, 7)
- Rune Arnesen – drums (tracks 1–3, 5, 7)
- Eivind Aarset – guitar (EBow) (tracks 1, 8), guitar (3, 4, 7), guitar (ambient) (track 5), sampler (tracks 1, 5), guitar treatments and talk box (track 2)
- Morten Mølster – guitar (tracks 2, 4, 5)
- Ulf W. Ø. Holand – sampler (tracks 2–4, 7)
- Roger Ludvigsen – percussion and dulcimer (track 1), acoustic guitar (tracks 6, 8)
- Reidar Skår – effects (track 3)
- Ab und Zu – samples (track 5)

=== Technical personnel ===
- Manfred Eicher, Ulf W. Ø. Holand – producer
- Ulf W. Ø. Holand – engineer
- Bill Laswell – sample production (track 5)
- Design – Sascha Kleis
- John Gollings – cover photography
- Knut Strand – liner photo

== Notes ==
- Recorded 1996–97 at Lydlab A/S, Oslo.
- Track 5 contains samples from the albums: "Axiom Ambient: Lost In The Translation" Courtesy of Axiom / Island Records; "Totally" Courtesy of Curling Legs Productions
- The cover shows the statue "Les Lutteurs". The photography was reproduced from the Galeries Nationales du Grand Palais exhibition catalogue "Angkor et dix siècles d'art khmer”, Paris 1997
- All compositions published by ECM Verlag
  ℗ 1997 ECM Records GmbH
  © 1997 ECM Records GmbH
- This CD was partly supported by "Fond for Utøvende Kunstnere” and NOPA
