= Gulleiv Wee =

- Born: 8 October 1969 (age 56); Sandnes, Rogaland
- Origin: Norway
- Genres: Jazz
- Occupation: Musician
- Instrument: Bass guitar
- Labels: Jazzland; Circulasione Totale
- Member of: Dream Pilots
- Formerly of: The September When; Wibutee
- Website: www.groove.no/artist/53927893/gulleiv-wee

Gulleiv Wee (born 8 October 1969 in Sandnes, Norway) is a Norwegian musician (bass), known from collaborations in the Norwegian band The September When.

== Career ==
After "The September When" broke up in 1996, Wee started the band "Janne Hagens Gospel Combo", "Dream Pilots" (2004–), "Salvation Street" and Wibutee (2000–01). He played once in an orchestra "Circulasione Totale Orchestra". He has been a central figure on the Norwegian music scene for more than two decades.

== Selected discography ==
Within The September When

- 1991: Mother I've Been Kissed (Warner Music Norway)
- 1993: One Eye Open (WEA)
- 1994: Hugger Mugger (WEA)
- 2008: Judas Kiss (EMI Music)

With "Circulasione Totale Orchestra»

- 1996: Recycling Grieg (Circulasione Totale)
- 2000: Enten Eller (Circulasione Totale)

Within Wibutee

- 1998: Newborn Thing (Jazzland), feat. Live Maria Roggen
- 2001: Eight Domestic Challenges (Jazzland)

With Han Innante

- 1998: Radio Innante Presenterer: Han Innante – Magalaust (Kulturkompaniet/Radio Innante)

With Anne Grete Preus

- 1999: Verden Er Et Vakkert Sted (Virgin Music)

With Erik Faber

- 1999: Between The Lines (Sony Music)

With Nadirsenit

- 2003: Nadirsenit (Plateselskapet Skarv)

With Morten Abel

- 2003: Being Everything, Knowing Nothing (Virgin Music)

With Sigvart Dagsland

- 2004: Underlig Frihet (Capitol Records)

With "Dream Pilots»

- 2004: Walkover (MTG Music)
- 2005: If You Ever Come Down (MTG Music)

With Svein Tang Wa

- 2005: På Kanten (Trembling Records)

With Live Maria Roggen

- 2007: Circuit Songs (Jazzland Recordings)

With Hovering Orville

- 2008: Silverlines (Checkpoint Charlie)
