= Live Extracts =

Live album by Eivind Aarset
- Released: 2010
- Venue: Moers Festival, Festivalzelt; Jazzfestival Saalfelden and Domicil, Dortmund; Leipziger Jazztage and Casa Del Jazz, Rome
- Genre: Jazz
- Length: 51:52
- Label: Jazzland
- Producer: Eivind Aarset; Franz Ruedel; Bernd Hoffman

Eivind Aarset chronology
Sonic Codex (2004)	Live Extracts (2010)	Dream Logic (2012)

Live Extracts is an album by Norwegian guitarist Eivind Aarset & The Sonic Codex Orchestra.

Professional ratings
Review scores
Source	Rating
BBC Music Magazine performance:	5/5 stars
BBC Music Magazine sound:	4/5 stars
The Guardian	3/5 stars

== Review ==
Aarset's fifth album as a leader embraces the improvisational power and skill of the expanded Sonic Codex Orchestra. All About Jazz critique John Kelman, in his review of Aarset's album Live Extracts states:

... «Live Extracts», culled from six different venues over the course of the past year. With minimal editing and no overdubs, this is as close to experiencing Aarset in performance as many will get, and for that reason alone is worthy of attention...

Here the band offer live versions of tunes that differ markedly from recordings on previous studio albums, yet maintain the essential characteristics that are the hallmark of Aarset's music: controlled floating threads that bind together the strong melodies and abstract soundscapes, shaded, ominous atmospheres suffused with deep, subtle colours.

== Reception ==
The BBC Music Magazine review awarded the album 5 stars for performance and 4 stars for sound, and The Guardian review awarded the album 3 stars.

== Track listing ==
1. «Electromoers» (2:16)
2. «Electromagnetic» (10:20)
3. «Still Changing» (7:54)
  Drums – Torstein Lofthus
  Saxophone – Håkon Kornstad
4. «Drøbak Saray» (9:43)
5. «Murky Seven» (2:06)
6. «Sign Of Seven » (9:46)
7. «Blå Meis» (9:47)
  Saxophone – Håkon Kornstad

== Personnel ==
- Bass – Audun Erlien
- Drums, electronics & percussion – Wetle Holte
- Drums & percussion – Erland Dahlen (tracks: 1, 2, 5 to 7)
- Guitar & electronics – Eivind Aarset
- Guitar & steel guitar (pedal steel) – Bjørn Charles Dreyer
- Trumpet & synthesizer – Gunnar Halle (tracks: 1 to 3, 5, 6)

== Credits ==
- Artwork – Stoffer Ganes
- Engineer (Casa Del Jazz) – Johnny Skalleberg
- Engineer (Domicil, Dortmund) – Johnny Skalleberg
- Engineer (Jazzfestival Saalfelden) – Martin Leitner, Øystein Karlsen
- Engineer (Moers Festival) – Geir Østenjø & Reiner Kúhl
- Engineer & recording (Leipziger Jazztage) – Øystein Karlsen
- Mastering – Bjørn Engelmann
- Mixing – Ulf Holand
- Photography – Oliver Heisch
- Producer – Eivind Aarset
- Producer (Jazzfestival Saalfelden) – Franz Ruedel
- Producer (Moers Festival) – Bernd Hoffman
- Recording (Casa Del Jazz) – Ascanio Cusella
- Recording (Domicil, Dortmund) – Fred Bauer
- Recording (Erland's Rehearsal Space) – Johnny Skalleberg
- Supervision (Moers Festival) – Georg Nihuesmann
- Technician (Casa Del Jazz) – Marcello Fagnani
- Written by Erlien, Dreyer, Aarset, Dahlen, Halle, Holte

== Notes ==
- Live recordings from:
- Track 1,2,5 & 6: Moers Festival, Festivalzelt
- Track 3: Jazzfestival Saalfelden and Domicil, Dortmund
- Track 4: Leipziger Jazztage and Casa Del Jazz, Rome
- Track 7: Erland's rehearsal space
- Mixed at Lydlab, mastered at Cutting Room
  ℗ 2010 Eivind Aarset
  © 2010 Jazzland Recordings
