= Wetle Holte =

Norwegian musician and composer (born 1973)

- Holte performing with Eivind Aarset 4tet in 2026

Background information
- Born: 4 September 1973 (age 53); Skien, Norway
- Genres: Jazz; electronica
- Occupations: Musician; composer
- Instruments: Drums
- Label: Jazzland
- Member of: Eivind Aarset 4tet

Wetle Holte (born 4 September 1973) is a Norwegian drummer and composer known for his collaborations with Silje Neergård, Kirsti Huke, Eivind Aarset, Wibutee, Bugge Wesseltoft, Anja Garbarek, and others.

== Life and career ==
Holte was born in Skien and is a graduate from the jazz programme at Trondheim Musikkonservatorium, where in 1996, he co-founded the jazz trio Triangle—later to become Wibutee—with Håkon Kornstad and Per Zanussi. In 1998, they released their debut album, Newborn Thing, and followed it with Eight Domestic Challenges in 2001 and Playmachine in 2004. In 2006, the trio released the Spellemannprisen-nominated album Sweet Mental.

Holte has also collaborated for over a decade with Eivind Aarset in projects like Électronique Noire and The Sonic Codex Orchestra, and he contributed to Bugge Wesseltoft's Jazzland Community in 2007.

== Selected discography ==
=== Solo ===
- Hurricane featuring Kirsti Huke (2012)

=== Collaborations ===
with Wibutee

- Newborn Thing (1998)
- Eight Domestic Challenges (2001)
- Playmachine (2004)
- Sweet Mental (2006)

with Eivind Aarset

- Light Extracts (2001)
- Connected (2004)
- Sonic Codex (2007)
- Live Extracts (2010)

with Jazzland Community

- Jazzland Community (2007)

with Grand Telemark

- Grand Telemark (2008)

with Eivind Aarset 4tet

- Phantasmagoria, or A Different Kind of Journey (2021)
- Strange Hands (2026)
