= Électronique Noire =

Studio album by Eivind Aarset
- Released: 1998
- Genres: Jazz; new age
- Length: 59:36
- Label: EmArcy
- Producer: Eivind Aarset

Eivind Aarset chronology
| Électronique Noire (1998) | Light Extracts (2001) |

Électronique Noire is the debut studio album by the Norwegian guitarist and composer Eivind Aarset, released in 1998.

== Reception ==
AllMusic awarded the album four stars, and Beate Nossum, writing for the Norwegian newspaper Dagbladet, gave it three. The New York Times termed it "one of the best post-Miles Davis electronic jazz albums..."

Professional ratings
Review scores
| Source | Rating |
|---|---|
| Allmusic | 4/5 stars |
| Dagbladet | 3/6 stars |

== Track listing ==
1. "Dark Moisture" (7:50)
2. "Entrance / U-Bahn" (8:33)
3. "Lost and Found" (7:32)
4. "Superstrings" (8:26)
5. "Électronique Noire" (3:53)
6. "Wake-Up Call" (6:36)
7. "Namib" (3:00)
8. "Spooky Danish Waltz" (7:06)
9. "Porcupine Night Walk" (6:40)

== Personnel ==
Musicians

- Nils Petter Molvær – trumpet (tracks 1, 4); vocals (track 2)
- Ingebrigt Håker Flaten – bass (tracks 1, 9)
- Jonny Sjo – bass (tracks 2, 4)
- Bjørn Kjellemyr – bass (track 8)
- Anders Engen – drums (tracks 1, 8, 9)
- Kim Ofstad – drums (tracks 2, 4–6, 8)
- Bugge Wesseltoft – Rhodes piano (track 1)
- Vidar Johansen – clarinet, saxophone (track 2)
- Kjetil Bjerkestrand – synthesizer (tracks 2, 3, 8)
- Kjetil Saunes – synthesizer (track 7)

Additional credits

- Arrangements – Eivind Aarset (tracks: 1–3, 5–9)
- Compositions – Eivind Aarset (tracks: 1–6, 8, 9)
- Cover design – Tina Jørgensen
- Mastering – Bernhard Löhr
- Photography – Mats H. Ljungberg
- Recording – Eivind Aarset (tracks: 1, 3–9)
