= It's Snowing on My Piano =

Studio album by Bugge Wesseltoft
- Released: 1997
- Recorded: 15–16 October 1997
- Studio: Rainbow Studio, Oslo, Norway
- Label: ACT Music
- Producer: Siegfried Loch

Professional ratings
Review scores
Source	Rating
The Penguin Guide to Jazz	3/4 stars

It's Snowing on My Piano is a solo piano album by pianist Bugge Wesseltoft.

== Background and recording ==
This was Wesseltoft's first solo piano album. It was recorded on 15 and 16 October 1997. It was produced by Siegfried Loch and the recording engineer at Rainbow Studio, Oslo was Jan Erik Kongshaug.

== Music ==
The album contains both traditional Christmas songs and Wesseltoft originals.

== Release and reception ==
The album was released by ACT Music in 1997. In 2017, it was described as the label's biggest seller, having sold more than 150,000 copies. It peaked at number three in Norway in 2009, and has re-entered the charts in the Christmas season every year since.

== Track listing ==
1. "It's snowing on my piano" (Bugge Wesseltoft) – 5:02
2. "Mitt hjerte alltid vanker" (traditional) – 4:46
3. "Deilig er jorden" (traditional) – 4:18
4. "O little town of Bethlehem" (traditional) – 4:51
5. "Du grønne, glitrende tre" (traditional) – 3:28
6. "Det kimer nå til julefest" (traditional) – 4:16
7. "Greensleeves, What Child is this" (traditional) – 3:41
8. "Kimer, I klokker" (traditional) – 3:51
9. "Es ist ein Ros entsprungen" (traditional) – 3:09
10. "Stille Nacht" (traditional) – 5:43
11. "Into eternal silence" (Wesseltoft) – 3:22
12. "In Dulce Jubile" (traditional) – 6:05

== Personnel ==
- Bugge Wesseltoft – piano
