= Connected (Eivind Aarset album) =

Studio album by Eivind Aarset
- Released: 2004
- Genre: Jazz
- Length: 52:04
- Label: Jazzland
- Producer: Eivind Aarset; Erik Honoré; Jan Bang

Eivind Aarset chronology
Light Extracts (2001)	Connected (2004)	Sonic Codex (2007)

Connected is an album by Norwegian guitarist Eivind Aarset.

John Kelman in his review states, "...the unique language that he has developed over the course of his previous two efforts, Electronique Noire and Light Extracts, would imply a more formidable technique at play that is simply so subtle that it is subsumed in the sheer musicality of the work. And that's exactly how it should be..."

== Reception ==
The review of the Norwegian newspaper Dagbladet awarded the album 5 stars (dice).

Professional ratings
Review scores
Source	Rating
Dagbladet	5/6 stars

== Track listing ==
1. «Family Pictures 1» (5:11)
  Composer – Eivind Aarset, Erik Honoré & Jan Bang
  Electronics (dictaphone) – Jan Bang
2. «Electro Magnetic In E» (5:12)
  Bass clarinet – Hans Ulrik
  Composer – Eivind Aarset & Wetle Holte
3. «Connectic» (6:28)
4. «Feverish» (4:33)
  Effects (different noises) – Eivind Aarset & Wetle Holte
  Tenor saxophone, bass clarinet, effects (clef noise) – Hans Ulrik
  Composer – Eivind Aarset & Wetle Holte
5. «Silk Worm» (7:02)
  Composer – Eivind Aarset & Wetle Holte
  Keyboards – Wetle Holte
6. «Nagabo Tomora» (5:29)
  Bass – Marius Reksjø
  Percussion – Rune Arnesen
  Turntables – Pål "Strangefruit" Nyhus
  Vocals, oud – Dhafer Youssef
7. «Blue In E» (7:11)
  Bass – Eivind Aarset
  Computer (Fx) – Raymond Pellicer
  Drums, percussion – Anders Engen
  Electronics (drum machine Fx] – Wetle Holte
8. «Transmission» (5:44)
  Composer – Eivind Aarset & Raymond C. Pellicer
  Engineer (assistant, stable) – Leif Johansen
  Producer – Raymond C. Pellicer
  Programming, recording (Stable Studio), mixing – Raymond C. Pellicer
9. «Family Pictures 2» (4:48)
  Composer – Eivind Aarset, Erik Honore & Jan Bang
10. «Changing Waltz» (7:14)

== Credits ==
- Artwork – Nicolai Schaanning Larsen
- Composer – Eivind Aarset (tracks: 4, 6, 7, 10)
- Double bass – Marius Reksjø (tracks: 2, 4, 5)
- Drums – Wetle Holte (tracks: 2–6, 10)
- Electronic drums – Wetle Holte (tracks: 4, 10)
- Electric bass – Marius Reksjø (tracks: 3, 4, 10)
- Electronics – Eivind Aarset (tracks: 1–3, 5–10)
- Guitar – Eivind Aarset
- Mastering – Thomas Eberger
- Mixing – Reidar Skår (tracks: 2 to 7, 10)
- Mixing, engineer – Erik Honoré (tracks: 1, 9)
- Photography – John Nordahl
- Producer – Eivind Aarset (tracks: 2 to 7, 10), Erik Honoré (tracks: 1, 9), Jan Bang (tracks: 1, 9)
- Programming – Eivind Aarset (tracks: 2, 3, 5, 6, 10), Wetle Holte (tracks: 2, 3, 5)
- Recording (7. Etage) – Reidar Skår (tracks: 2, 4, 7)
- Recording (Audiopol) – Espen Gundersen (tracks: 4, 10)
- Recording (Bugges Room) – Andy Mytteis (tracks: 2, 3, 5, 6)
- Recording (Studio 1, Katakomben) – Eivind Aarset (tracks: 2, 3, 5–8, 10)
- Sampler – Jan Bang (tracks: 1, 9)
- Synthesizer (noise, Fx) – Marius Reksjø (tracks: 4, 5)

== Notes ==
- Recorded at Punkt Studio (1,9), Bugges Room/7 Etg/Studio 1/Katakomben (2), Bugges Room/Katakomben (3,5,6), Audiopol/7 Etg (4), Katakomben/7. Etage (7), Stable Studio/Katakomben (8), Audiopol/Katakomben (10)
- Mixed at Punkt Studio (1,9), 7. Etage (2,3,4,5,6,7,10), Eget Studio (8)
- Mastered at Cutting Room
