= Helge Iberg =

Norwegian composer and pianist

Helge Roald Iberg (born 1954) was educated at the University of Oslo in music in music, history of ideas, and religious studies. He holds a master's degree in composition from the Norwegian Academy of Music

Iberg began playing the piano at the age of 3-4. As an adult, he has navigated between the scores of contemporary classical music and modern jazz. His music has been commissioned and performed by Norway's leading soloists and symphony orchestras.

Iberg has written instrumental concertos for pianist Christian Ihle Hadland, violinist Terje Tønnesen, trumpeter Ole Edvard Antonsen, and violinist Atle Sponberg. In 2019, he completed the work Songs from the Planet of Life, a Concerto Grosso for symphony orchestra, five soloists, and two narrators. The work is inspired by Gustav Mahler's Das Lied von der Erde. His new chamber opera, Great Expectations, is based on a piece by the internationally renowned playwright Fredrik Bratberg.

Regarding the work Songs From the Planet of Life (2019), Guy Richards in Klassisk Musikkmagasin: "Nevertheless, it is Iberg's music that is so seductive, its sparkling textures a constant delight expressed in rather calm movements, but always with musical interest across a vast range." For the release of this work, he received the Spellemann Award 2019 in the TONO Composer category.

As a jazz musician and improviser, Iberg has produced several CDs and collaborated with performers such as Bendik Hofseth, Sidsel Endresen, and Nils Petter Molvær. NRK's jazz critic Erling Wicklund wrote this about the piano album Standards and Vanguards: "A standing challenge to musicians and listeners around the world, whether you come from the ranks of standard songs or avant-garde: Help yourself to the top shelf, make the music your own, everything is possible, everything is allowed, we live in a fantastic time – seize it, play and hear the unheard!"

Helge Iberg has published two culturally critical books and about 40 essays and articles in journals and newspapers. Book publications: "The Uncomfortable Odor of Tenderized Time"– essays, (Koloritt 2008) and "When Time Has Come, It's Always Too Late" – short texts, (Schibsted 2012).

== Awards ==
- Prix Italia in 1990 in the category Best Music Program, Radio for The Problem of Evil & Co
- Work of the Year 1991 from NOPA for The Problem of Evil etc.
- Nominated for the Spellemann Award 1991 in the Open Category for The Problem of Evil etc.
- Nominated for the Spellemann Award 1993 in the Children's Album category for Alice Longs to Return
- Nominated for the Edvard Prize 2001
- Nominated for the Edvard Prize 2016 in the Contemporary Category for Quartet for Life in Its Uncommonness
- Spellemann Award 2019 in the TONO Composer category for Helge Iberg: Songs from the Planet of Life
- Nominated for the Edvard Prize 2020 in the Contemporary Category for Songs From the Planet of Life
- Music Publishers' Prize 2021 in the category Work of the Year – Classical/Contemporary Music for Songs From the Planet of Life
