= Bendik Hofseth =

Norwegian jazz musician

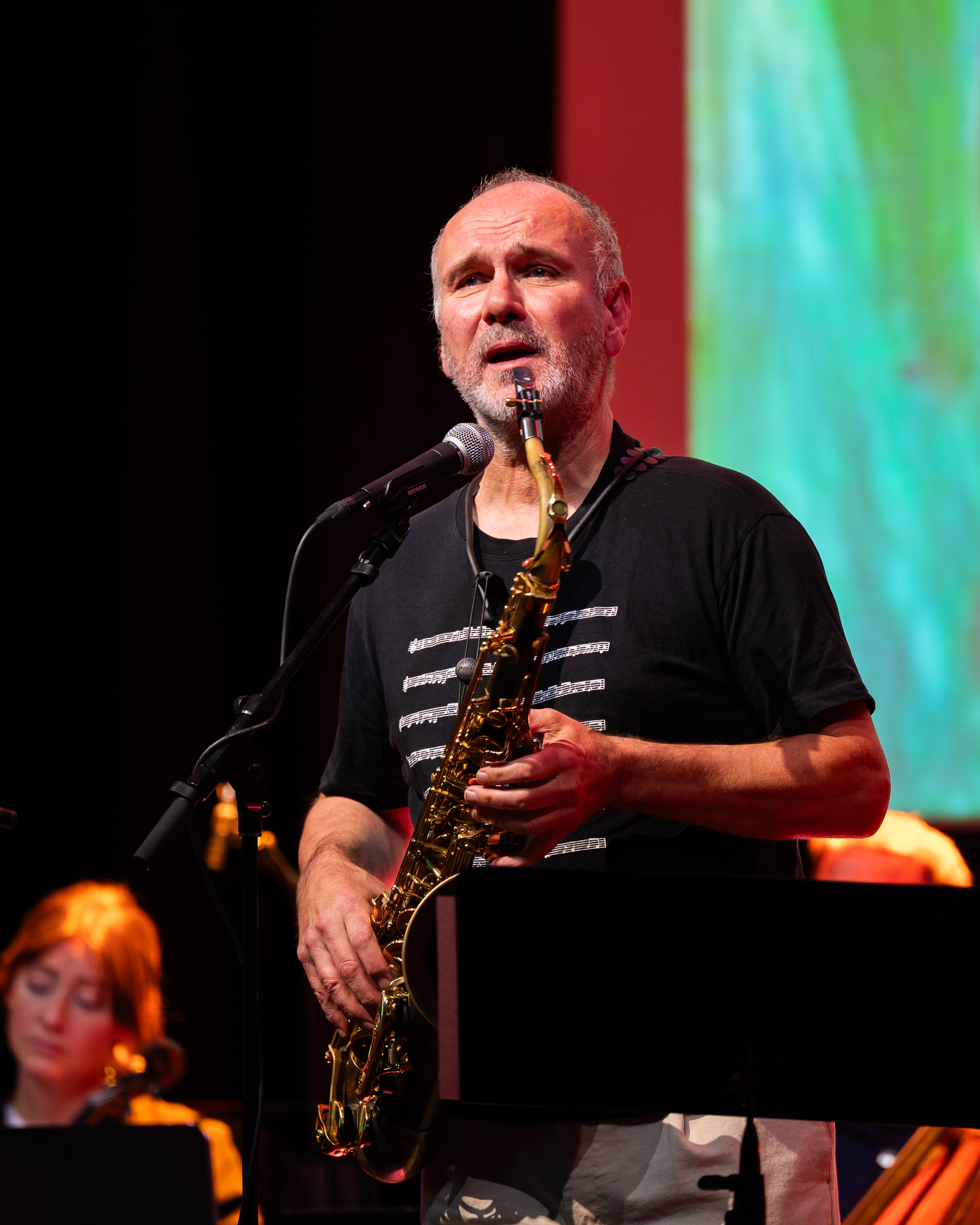

Background information
- Born: 19 October 1962 (age 63); Oslo, Norway
- Origin: Norway
- Genres: Jazz
- Occupations: Musician, composer
- Instruments: Saxophone, vocals
- Website: Official website

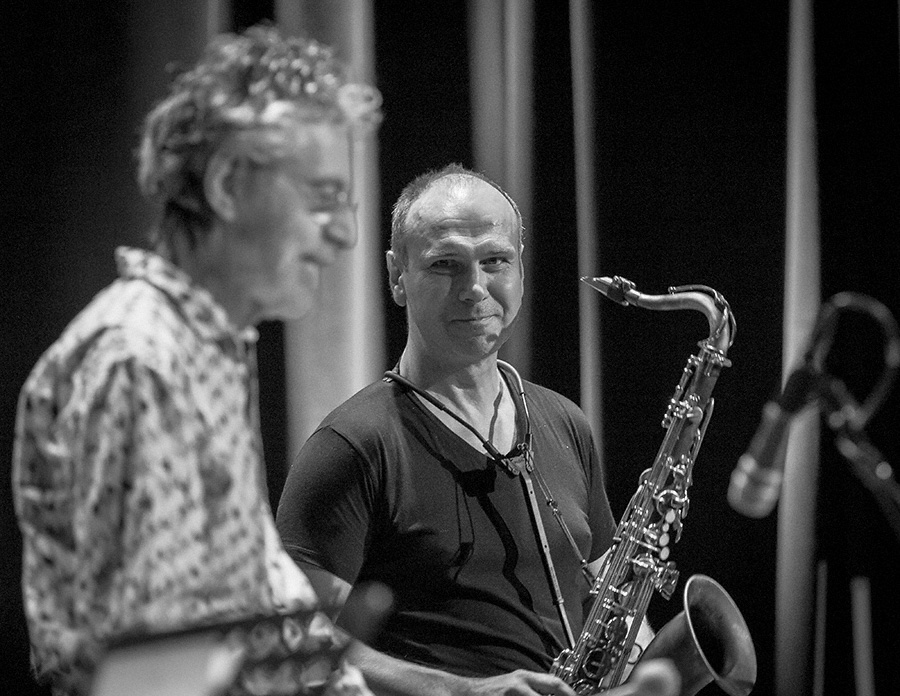
Bendik Hofseth is a protégé of Mike Mainieri. Here both are at a concert on Cosmopolite Scene in Oslo in 2016.

Bendik Hofseth (born 19 October 1962) is a Norwegian jazz musician and a professor with the University of Agder. In 2026, he was appointed Knight First Class of the Royal Norwegian Order of St. Olav for his contributions to Norwegian and international musical life.

Hofseth plays the saxophone, sings, and arranges and composes music. He is also a band leader and a producer.

== Career ==
Hofseth was born in Oslo. In 1986, while in his early twenties, he moved from Lørenskog, Norway, to New York City. Soon after, he replaced saxophonist Michael Brecker in the band Steps Ahead. Along with Steps Ahead, he has toured worldwide several times since 1987.

In 1994, Hofseth presented the commission Metamorfoser at Vossajazz. The piece was written for the Norwegian "Rikskonsertene" and was performed on concert tours in 1994. The concert at Rockefeller in Oslo was recorded and the music released in 1995, with Mike Mainieri (vibraphone), Eivind Aarset (guitar), Anders Jormin (double bass), Talvin Singh (tablas) and Jon Christensen (percussion).

Hofseth has released fifteen albums under his own name, and has through the years received numerous awards and honors for them. He has also worked as a record producer for among others Jan Eggum and Kenneth Sivertsen. In addition, he has composed numerous commissioned works, film music and founded a chamber music festival in Fredrikstad.

During the period 2000–2020 he held key positions in Norwegian and international music organizations. As the leader of The International Council of Music Creators, CIAM (Le Conseil International des Créateurs de Musique) he represented 2.6 million composers and lyricists worldwide. He has also served as chairman of NOPA, by:Larm, and Phonofile, and was the director of TONO and NcB.

Hofseth also work as musical instructor and teacher, and is employed by the University of Agder, where he is central to the development of a new course in Music Management. Here, he is also responsible for the conference "Challenge of the New".

== Discography ==
=== Solo ===
- IX (Columbia, 1991)
- Amuse Yourself (Columbia, 1993)
- Metamorphoses (Sonet/Verve, 1995)
- Planets, Rivers and...Ikea (Verve Forecast, 1996)
- Colours (Sonet/Verve, 1997)
- Smilets Historie (Sonet, 1999)
- Itaka (Grappa, 2005)
- XI (Grappa, 2009)
- Children & Cosmopolitans (JazzCode, 2015)
- Atonement (C+C, 2018)
- Trunks (C+C, 2020)
- Roots (C+C, 2021)
- Branches (C+C, 2021)
- Pollen & Leaves (C+C, 2023)
- Lux ex Lacrimis (C+C, 2024)

=== With others ===
- Michael Villmow's KBB, Köln Big Band featuring Bendik Hofseth & Chad Wackerman: N (1991, Lipstick records)
- Bendik Hofseth, Anne-Lise Berntsen, Helge Iberg: Ludo (1997, Kirkelig Kulturverksted)
- Bendik Hofseth, Jacob Young, Mats Eilertsen, Paolo Vinaccia with Mike Mainieri: The Maze (2016, Oslo Session Recordings)
- Paolo Vinaccia, Jacob Young, Bendik Hofseth: Rathkes gate 12:21:58 (2017, Oslo Session Recordings)
- Orchestre national de jazz de Montréal + Bendik Hofseth: Smilets Historie LIVE (2023)

=== As sideman ===
==== With Steps Ahead ====
- N.Y.C. (Capitol, Intuition 1989)
- Yin-Yang (NYC, 1992)

==== With Arild Andersen ====
- Sagn (Kirkelig Kulturverksted, 1990)
- Arv (Kirkelig Kulturverksted, 1994)
- Hyperborean (ECM, 1997)

==== With Jan Eggum ====
- Underveis (Grappa, 1991)
- Nesten Ikke Tilstede (Grappa, 1993)
- Kjaerlighet & AErlighet 2 (Grappa, 2011)
- Kjaerlighet & AErlighet 3 (Grappa, 2011)

==== With Bjorn Eidsvag ====
- Pa Leit (Kirkelig Kulturverksted, 1984)
- Bjorn's Beste (Kirkelig Kulturverksted, 1985)
- Dansere I Natten (Kirkelig Kulturverksted, 1986)
- Allemannsland (Norsk, 1993)

==== With Helge Iberg ====
- Never Ending West Side Story (Kirkelig Kulturverksted, 1997)
- Halvveis (Curling Legs, 2000)
- ReHumaniZing (Aurora, 2007)
- A Musical Offering (Odin, 2017)

==== With Anne Grete Preus ====
- Lav Sol! Hoy Himmel (WEA, 1989)
- Millimeter (WEA, 1994)
- Om Igjen for Forste Gang (Warner, 2007)

==== With Oystein Sevag ====
- Close Your Eyes and See (Siddhartha Spiritual, 1989)
- Link (Siddhartha Spiritual, 1993)
- Global House (Siddhartha Spiritual, 1994)
- Caravan (Siddhartha Spiritual, 2005)
- The Red Album (Siddhartha Spiritual, 2010)

==== Others ====
- Ab und Zu: Ab und Zu (EMI, 1989)
- Maj Britt Andersen: Folk Er Rare! (Barneselskapet, 1986)
- Maj Britt Andersen: Tida Gar Sa Altfor Fort (Barneselskapet, 1987)
- Rebekka Bakken: Is That You? (Boutique/Universal, 2005)
- Jan Bang: Frozen Feelings (CBS, 1989)
- Ragnar Bjerkreim & Edvard Hoem: Oratoriet Kong David (Lynor/Trembling, 2004)
- Christina Bjordal: Brighter Days (Universal, 2006)
- Ketil Bjornstad: Grace (EmArcy, 2001)
- Brother to Brother: Materialize (WEA, 1990)
- Jonas Fjeld: Texas Jensen (Stageway, 1993)
- Christer Fredriksen: Urban Country (Losen, 2011)
- Inger Marie Gundersen: Feels Like Home (Stunt, 2018)
- Ciwan Haco: Bilura Min (Kom Muzik, 1997)
- Ciwan Haco: Derya Ses (Plak, 2003)
- Morten Harket: Wild Seed (Warner Bros., 1995)
- Finn Kalvik: Livets Lyse Side (Carat, 2000)
- Hanne Krogh: Hanne (Sonet, 1989)
- Tony Levin: World Diary Discipline (Global Mobile, 1995)
- Mike Mainieri: Northern Lights (NYC, 2006)
- Andrea Marcelli: Oneness (Lipstick, 1993)
- Hans Mathisen: Moving Forward (Curling Legs, 2019)
- Silje Nergaard: Nightwatch (Universal/EmArcy, 2003)
- Silje Nergaard: Chain of Days (Okeh, 2015)
- Oslo Gospel Choir: Get Up! (RCA, 1994)
- Lakki Patey: Eventyrland (Honepress, 1985)
- Kjetil Saunes: Fyr (Grappa, 1996)
- Andy Summers: World Gone Strange (Private Music, 1991)
- Pal Thowsen: Sympathy (NorDisc, 1983)
- Jimi Tunnell: Trilateral Commission (101 South, 1992)
- Jacob Young: This Is You (NORCD, 1995)
- Jacob Young: Glow (Curling Legs, 2001)
- Bertine Zetlitz: Morbid Latenight Show (Parlophone, 1998)

Awards
Preceded by Knut Riisnæs	Recipient of the Jazz Gammleng-prisen; 1993	Succeeded by Totti Bergh
