= Dream Logic (album) =

2012 studio album by Eivind Aarset

Studio album by Eivind Aarset
- Released: 12 November 2012
- Recorded: 2011–2012
- Studios: Punkt Studio & Tjernsbråtan
- Genre: Jazz
- Length: 47:27
- Label: ECM
- Producer: Jan Bang

Eivind Aarset chronology
Live Extracts (2010)	Dream Logic (2012)	'IE' (2015)

Dream Logic is a studio album by the Norwegian guitarist and composer Eivind Aarset, released in November 2012.

Professional ratings
Review scores
Source	Rating
The Independent	4/5 stars
Allmusic.com	4/5 stars
Dagbladet	5/6 stars

== Background ==
On Dream Logic, Aarset plays guitar, bass, and percussion, with musical contributions from producer Jan Bang and drummer Audun Kleive.

== Reception ==
The Independent and Allmusic.com awarded the album four stars each, and the Norwegian newspaper Dagbladet gave it five.

== Track listing ==
1. "Close (for Comfort)" (06:34)
2. "Surrender" (04:21)
3. "Jukai (Sea of Trees)" (03:45)
4. "Black Silence" (04:03)
5. "Active" (03:20)
6. "Close (Variation I)" (02:39)
7. "Reactive" (02:21)
8. "Homage to Greene" (05:29)
9. "The Whispering Forest" (05:42)
10. "Close (Variation II)" (01:43)
11. "The Beauty of Decay" (07:06)

== Personnel ==
- Eivind Aarset – guitars, bass guitar, electronics, percussion, samples, programming
- Jan Bang – samples, dictaphone, programming
- Audun Kleive – log drum sample (track 9)

== Credits ==
- Recorded and mixed at Punkt Studio and Tjernsbråtan by Jan Bang, Erik Honoré, and Jan Erik Kongshaug
- Mastering: Jan Erik Kongshaug, Rainbow Studio
- Produced by Jan Bang
