= Audun Erlien =

Norwegian jazz musician

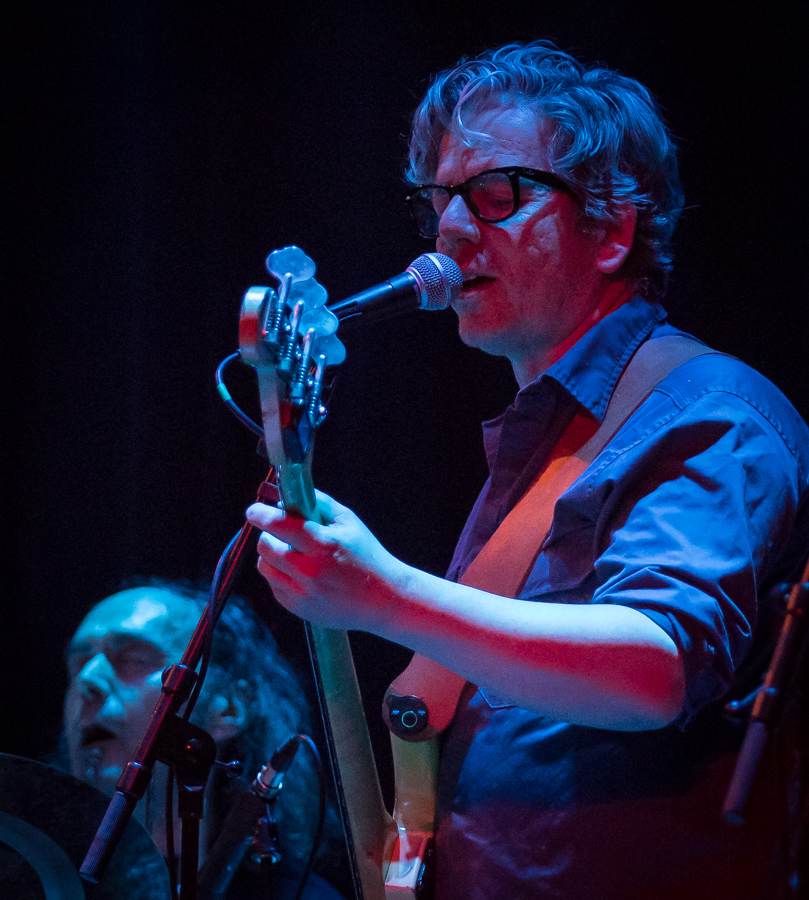
- Erlien in 2017

Background information
- Born: 22 February 1967 (age 58)
- Genres: Jazz
- Occupation: Musician
- Instrument(s): Bass guitar guitar
- Years active: 1985 – present

Audun Erlien (born 22 February 1967 in Oslo, Norway) is a Norwegian jazz musician (bass guitar, guitar and electronica), known from several albums in various genres.

== Career ==
Erlien was raised in Tønsberg, Norway, and has been a musician since 1985. He has participated on albums with the likes of Knut Reiersrud (regular band member in the 1990es), Bendik Hofseth (band member), Jonas Fjeld, Rick Danko and Eric Andersen, David Lindley and Henry Kaiser, Deeyah Khan, Vidar Busk, Anja Garbarek, Silje Nergaard (bandmember 1985–91), Alex Rosén, Ciwan Haco, Earl Wilson, Grethe Svensen, Øystein Sevåg, Carsten Loly, Ole Paus, Karl Seglem, Patrick Shaw Iversen, Anita Skorgan, Siri Christensen, Jacob Young, May Britt Haug, Knut Halmrast, Lakki Patey, Kristin Skaare, Jan Eggum, Lars Lillo Stenberg, Frode Alnæs (within his band), Nils Petter Molvær (within Khmer, 1997–2002), Dhafer Youssef, Eivind Aarset (his own trio), Jarle Bernhoft, Mahsa & Marjan Vahdat, Mathias Eick (in his own Quintet). Lisa Bonnár. He also teaches bass guitar at the Norges Musikkhøgskole.
