= Beady Belle =

Norwegian jazz band

- Origin: Oslo, Norway
- Genres: Jazz; acid jazz; electronica
- Years active: 1999–present
- Label: Jazzland
- Members: Beate S. Lech; Marius Reksjø; Erik Holm
- Website: Official website

Beady Belle is a Norwegian jazz band founded by Beate S. Lech with her bassist and husband Marius Reksjø, after having been encouraged to make a record by Bugge Wesseltoft at Jazzland Recordings.

== Biography ==
Lech and Reksjø studied music together at the University of Oslo, and as music students they started several bands together. Their music flows in the landscape between jazz and acid-jazz, using upbeat and downbeat electronica roots, using vocal harmonies, piano, and strings. However, the music also incorporates elements of several other genres.

From 2003, things really start to happen, both commercially and critically, and now Beady Belle is an internationally known band. After a concert in London during a European tour in 2005, the UK jazz performer Jamie Cullum came backstage to talk with the band. That meeting sparked a big tour over UK and some concerts in Germany, France, Norway, Sweden and Denmark, with Beady Belle as Cullum's supporting act. In 2008, they appeared at the Calgary Jazz Festival in Canada.

The original band split up in 2015 but vocalist and songwriter Beate S. Lech has since released two albums under the name Beady Belle.

Under the name Beady Belle, Lech participated in Melodi Grand Prix 2021 and attempted to represent Norway in the Eurovision Song Contest 2021 with the song "Playing With Fire". She did not qualify from Heat 1, and did not win in the Second Chance round.

== Band members ==
- Beate S. Lech (vocals, composer)
- Marius Reksjø (bass, programming)
- Erik Holm (drums)

== Discography ==
- Home (Jazzland, 2001)
- CEWBEAGAPPIC (Jazzland, 2003)
- Closer (Jazzland, 2005)
- Belvedere (Jazzland, 2008)
- At Welding Bridge (Jazzland, 2010)
- Cricklewood Broadway (Jazzland, 2013)
- On My Own (Jazzland, 2016)
- Dedication (Jazzland, 2018)
- Nothing but the Truth (Jazzland, 2022)
