= Lakki Patey =

- Born: 3 September 1958 (age 67)
- Origin: England
- Genres: Jazz fusion Latin music Ambient music
- Occupations: Musician, composer, inventor
- Instrument: Guitar
- Years active: 1983–present
- Labels: Atlantic Records; Sidharta Records; BMG Records
- Website: www.newamigos.com

Lakki Patey (born 3 September 1958) is an English-Norwegian guitarist and inventor. He moves between musical styles and has also invented the language game and cultural concept New Amigos. He is the younger brother of the jazz guitarist Bent Patey.

== Biography ==
Patey led the bands Some Like It Hot, Hot Cubano and Windflowers. He has toured the US and Europe and has been a guest artist among others with Michael Ruff & The Yellow Jackets. In 1999 released the album Hot Cubano, where he brought four musicians from Cuba to Norway for the recording and a nationwide tour.

Patey's compositions are used for teaching materials, as well as on international successes like Café del Mar, A Winter’s Solstice and Northern Lights. The tune Mexico is used in TV commercials for New Amigos in Mexico. In 1985 he created the ambient «Eventyrland» for fanciful scenes in Trollgrotten, contained inside the Troll of Hunderfossen Familiepark.

== Discography ==
=== Solo albums ===
- 1985: Taki Taki (Slagerfabrikken)
- 1985: Eventyrland (Hønepress A/S)
- 1995: Musi©alendar (Atlantic Records), with 12 compositions for solo guitar and re recorded in 1996.
- 1996: Some Like it Hot (Heartbeat Records), musical producer Robbin Millar
- 1996: Musi©alendar (Atlantic Records), with Lithuanian Symphony Orchestra, music arranged by Michael Gibbs and music arranged by Michael Gibbs
- 1999: Miami Latino (Musikk og tekst av Lakki Patey + andre), recorded over a two-year period in places like Los Angeles, Miami and Oslo, including with Michael Ruff & The Yellow Jackets as well as Latvian Symphony Orchestra
- 1999: Hot Cubano (Tradisjonell Salsa)
- 1999: Mexico (Edel Records), musical production by Jam & Delgado

=== Collaborations ===
With Øystein Sevåg

- 1983: Windflowers (Siddhartha Spiritual Music), nominated for the Spellemannprisen
- 1993: Link (Siddhartha Spiritual Music)
- 1994: Visual (Siddhartha Spiritual Music), named by Wind & Wire magazine in USA as «Best Ambient Album of the Year» 1996.
- 1995: Global House (Siddhartha Spiritual Music)
- 2002: Amor Fati (Siddhartha Spiritual Music), with Kristin Flood
- 2005: Caravan (Siddhartha Spiritual Music)

With Bang 85

- 1985: The Further You Go (Spider Records), including with Sidsel Endresen

With Inger Lise Rypdal

- 1988: Romanse (Agentus Production)
