= Marlui Miranda =

Brazilian ethnomusicologist (born 1949)

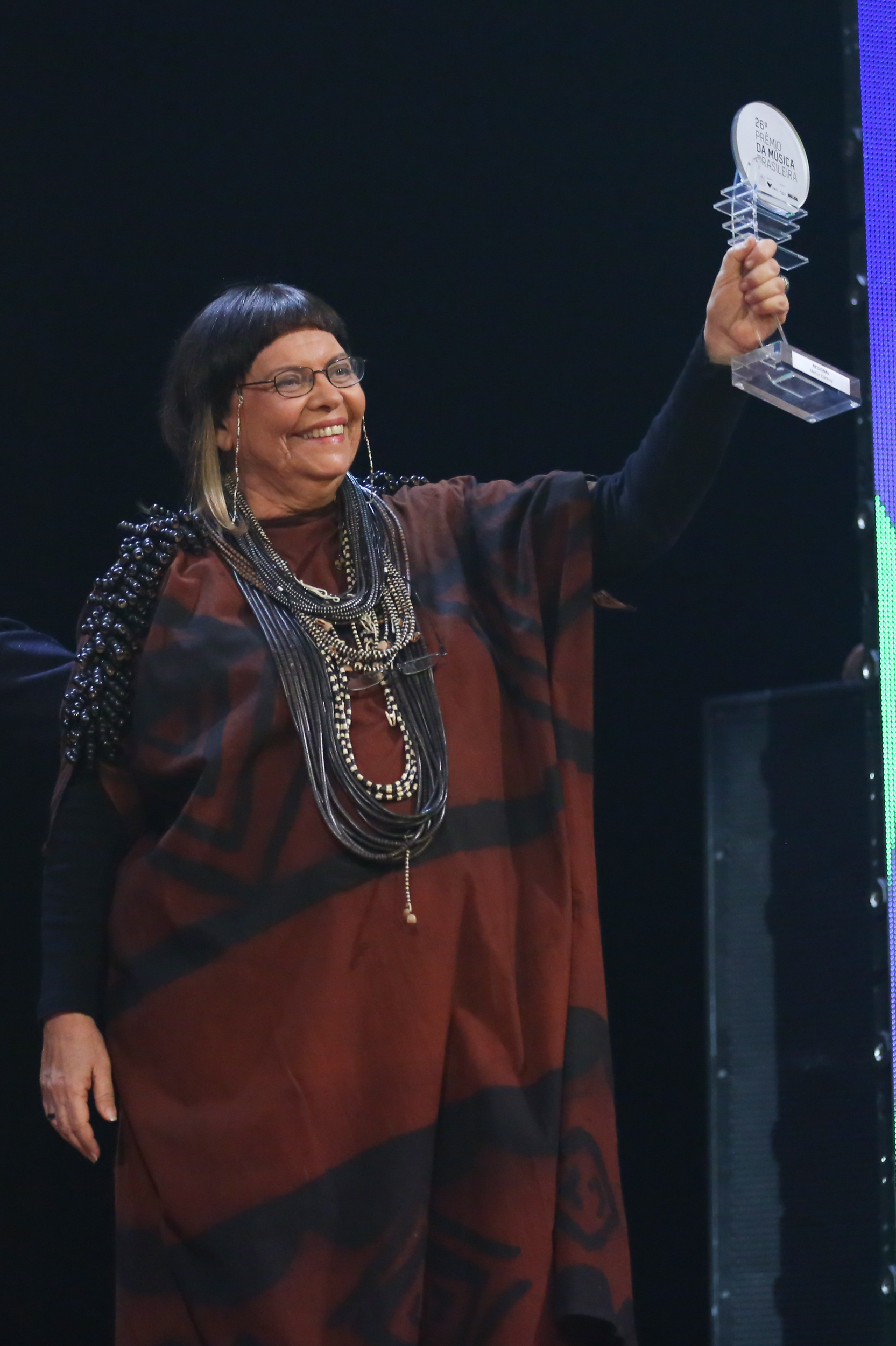
- Marlui Miranda at the Brazilian Music Awards 2015
- Born: 1949 (age 76–77); Fortaleza, Brazil
- Occupations: Songwriter, ethnomusicologist
- Years active: 1970s-present

Marlui Miranda is a Brazilian singer, musician, and researcher known for her performances of indigenous music from the Amazon. She has collaborated with Brazilian musicians Gilberto Gil, Egberto Gismonti, Milton Nascimento, and Nana Vasconcelos.

== Life ==
Miranda was born in Fortaleza in Northeast Brazil. She moved to Rio de Janeiro in 1971 and studied classical guitar with the musician Turíbio Santos. Miranda has conducted extensive research on Brazilian indigenous music, and was awarded a Guggenheim Fellowship in 1986 that supported the creation of her early music. In the 1990s, Miranda performed as a vocalist and guitarist with the Brazilian instrumental group Pau Brasil, whose album Babel was nominated for a Grammy Award for Best Jazz Instrumental Performance. The 1991 adventure film At Play in the Fields of the Lord, set in the Amazon River Basin, features Miranda's contributions to the soundtrack and language creation for the fictional Niaruna tribe. Her 1995 album Ihu Todos Os Sons presented music from the Nambikwara, Yanomami and Jabuti peoples of Brazil arranged and performed by Miranda and featuring appearances by Gilberto Gil and Uakti.

In 1998-1998, Miranda taught as a visiting professor at the University of Chicago Department of Anthropology. In 2003, Miranda was a Montgomery Fellow at Dartmouth College and co-taught a class on indigenous music in Brazil. Miranda was awarded the Brazilian Order of Cultural Merit in 2002.

== Selected discography ==
- Olho D`Agua (Warner, 1979)
- Revivencia (Memoria, 1986)
- Rio Acima (Memoria, 1989)
- Paiter Merewa (Memória, 1987)
- IHU, Todos os Sons (Pau Brasil, 1995)
- Kewere: Rezar (Pau Brasil 1997)
- Ponte entre Povos (SESC-SP 2005)
