= Hans Ulrik =

Danish jazz saxophonist and composer (born 1965)

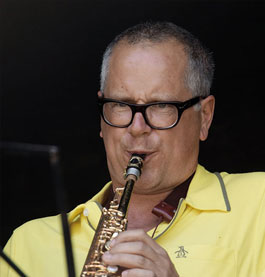

Background information
- Born: 28 September 1965 (age 59); Copenhagen, Denmark
- Genres: Jazz
- Occupation: Musician
- Instrument: Saxophone
- Labels: Stunt
- Website: hansulrik.com

Hans Ulrik (born 28 September 1965) is a Danish jazz saxophonist and composer who has recorded with Gary Peacock, Adam Nussbaum, Niels Lan Doky, Audun Kleive, Marilyn Mazur, John Scofield, and Steve Swallow.

== Career ==
Ulrik studied jazz saxophone at Berklee College of Music in Boston (1984–86). He continued his studies after a visit in New York City (1986) until 1987. Since 1987 he has been the leader of various bands like Pinocchio (1987), Hans Ulrik Fusion (1988–89), Ulrik/Hess Quartet (1989–90), Hans Ulrik Group (1991–95), Wombat (1995–98), Hans Ulrik Jazz & Mambo (1998–2003) and Hans Ulrik Quartet (from 2003).

In addition to various Danish jazz awards Ulrik has received the award of the European Jazz Competition in Leverkusen 1988 the prize for best soloist and 1990. Third prize at the Jazz Festival in Rome. In 2002 he undertook a tour of China, Hong Kong, Malaysia and Australia. In 2005 he joined Steve Swallow at the Montreal Jazz Festival.

== Honors ==
- European Jazz Competition in Leverkusen 1988
- Best Soloist in the European Jazz Competition 1990
- Third prize at the Jazz Festival in Rome 2002

== Discography ==
=== As leader ===
- Fusion (Salut, 1988)
- Ulrik/Hess Quartet (Olufsen, 1990)
- Day After Day (Storyville, 1992)
- Strange World (Stunt, 1994)
- Danske Sange (Stunt, 1998)
- Jazz and Mambo (Stunt, 1998)
- Shortcuts Jazzpar Combo 1999 (Stunt, 2000)
- Jazz & Latin Beats (Stunt, 2001)
- Trio (Stunt, 2002)
- Danish Standards (Stunt, 2003)
- Blue & Purple (Stunt, 2004)
- Tin Pan Aliens (Stunt, 2005)
- Tribal Dance (Stunt, 2006)
- Believe in Spring (Stunt, 2007)
- Slow Procession (Stunt, 2009)
- The Adventures of a Polar Expedition (Cowbell Music, 2010)
- The Christmas Song (Stunt, 2013)
- Equilibrium (Stunt, 2013)
- Suite of Time (Stunt, 2015)
- The Meeting (2020), with Anders Mogensen, Niclas Knudsen and Steve Swallow

=== As sideman ===
With Eivind Aarset

- Light Extracts (Jazzland, 2001)
- Connected (Jazzland, 2004)
- Sonic Codex (Jazzland, 2007)

With Kenneth Bager

- Fragment Eight (Music for Dreams, 2006)
- Fragments from a Space Cadet (Music for Dreams, 2006)
- Fragments from AaSpace Cadet 2 (Music for Dreams, 2010)
- The Sound of Swing Part 2 (Music for Dreams, 2011)

With Jorgen Emborg

- Heart of the Matter (Stunt, 1990)
- Ships in the Night (Stunt, 1993)
- A Circle of Songs (Stunt, 1994)
- Face the Music (Stunt, 1997)
- Emborg's Moonsongs (Stunt, 2005)
- Statements (Gateway Music, 2008)

With Jesper Lundgaard

- Celluloid (Music Mecca, 2005)
- Sculpting (Music Mecca, 2007)
- 2016 (Storyville, 2016)

With Marilyn Mazur

- Circular Chant (Storyville, 1995)
- Small Labyrinths (ECM, 1997)
- All the Birds Reflecting + Adventurous (Stunt, 2002)
- Daylight Stories (Stunt, 2004)

With Caecilie Norby

- Queen of Bad Excuses (Blue Note, 1999)
- Slow Fruit (Copenhagen, 2005)
- Arabesque (ACT, 2010)

With others

- Babou, For Once in My Life (RecArt Music, 2005)
- Frans Bak, Den Poppede Hone (Olufsen, 1993)
- Frans Bak, Natsange (Stunt, 1999)
- Peter Belli, Ny Dag Pa Vej (CMC, 2001)
- Hanne Boel, Misty Paradise (EMI, 1994)
- Danish National Symphony Orchestra, Morricone Duel (EuroArts, 2018)
- Danish Radio Big Band, The Impaler (Red Dot Music, 2010)
- Danish Radio Big Band, Merry Christmas, Baby (Red Dot Music, 2009)
- Trine Dyrholm, Et Frossent Ojeblik (It's Magic 1988)
- Anders Frandsen, Anders Frandsen (Kavan, 1992)
- Louise Fribo, Dromte Mig en Drom (EMI, 1999)
- Anne Linnet, Pige Traed Varsomt (Pladecompagniet, 1995)
- Jacob Groth, The Boys from St. Petri (Replay, 1991)
- Judy Niemack, New York Stories (Sunnyside, 2018)
- Stig Kreutzfeldt, Der Er Kun En (Rosen, 1987)
- Lill Lindfors, Har Ar Den Skona Sommar (Virgin, 2006)
- Lisa Nilsson, En Jubileumssamling (Columbia/(Sony, 2010)
- Steen Rasmussen, Canta (Stunt, 2018)
- Sinne Eeg, Mads Vinding, Abrikostraeet (Calibrated, 2005)
- Santa Cruz, Cruzing (Cowbell Music, 2005)
- Santa Cruz, When the Sun Goes Down (Gateway Music, 2009)
- Lene Siel, Aftenstemning (RecArt Music, 2000)
- Curtis Stigers, One More for the Road (Concord Jazz, 2017)
