= Bugge Wesseltoft =

Norwegian jazz musician (born 1964)

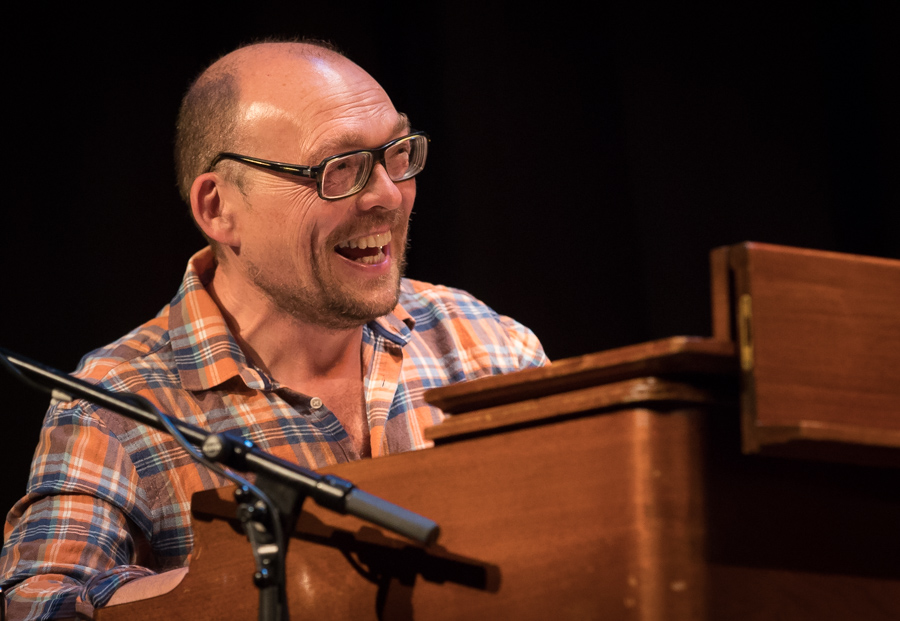
- Wesseltoft in 2016

Background information
- Born: Jens Christian Bugge Wesseltoft; 1 February 1964 (age 62); Porsgrunn, Norway
- Genres: Jazz; nu jazz; electronica
- Occupations: Musician; composer; music producer
- Instruments: Piano; keyboards; electronic instruments; percussion
- Labels: Jazzland; ECM

Jens Christian Bugge Wesseltoft (born 1 February 1964) is a Norwegian jazz pianist, composer, and producer, son of jazz guitarist Erik Wesseltoft.

== Career ==
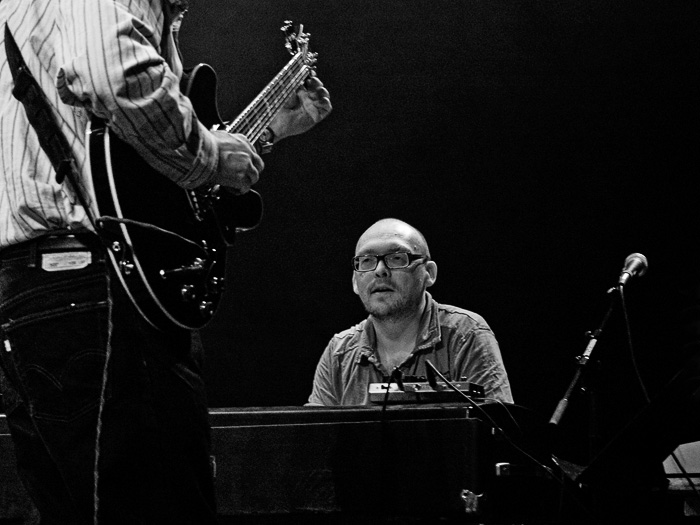
Bugge Wesseltoft (with John Scofield) at Moers Festival 2006, Germany

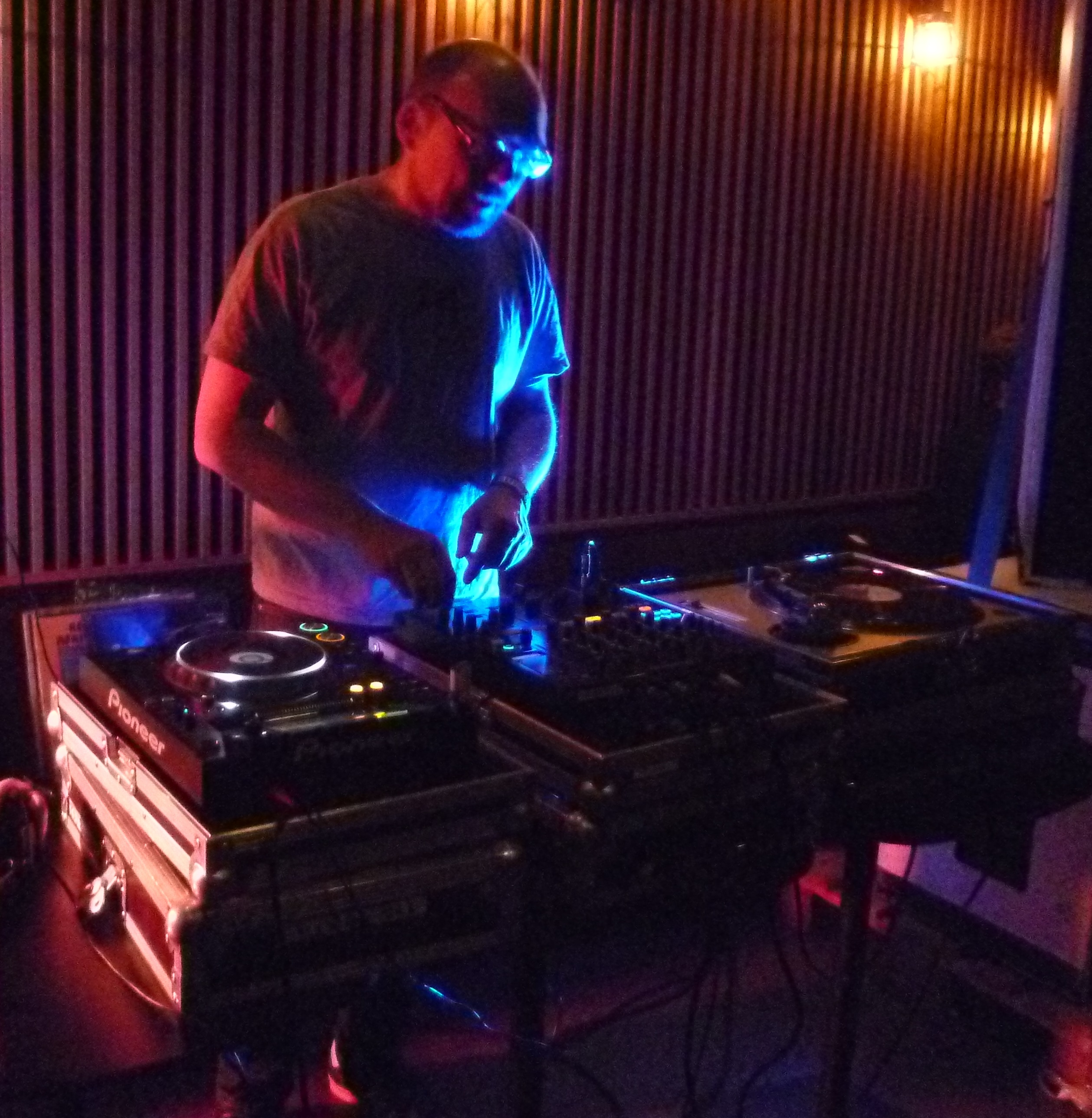
DJ Bugge at Nattjazz 2016 in Bergen, Norway

In 1989, Wesseltoft collaborated with the Knut Riisnæs Quartet and was soon after contacted by Arild Andersen to join in on commissioned work for Vossajazz—released on the album Sagn (1990)—and the follow-up Arv (1993). He worked with Jan Garbarek on his Molde Canticle, a commission from Moldejazz, released on the 1990 album I Took Up the Runes.

Wesseltoft had an impact on the Norwegian jazz scene at the beginning of the 1990s while going through a transition from Nordic jazz traditions, exemplified by the ECM label, to a style sometimes referred to as "future jazz" or nu jazz. Thereafter, he toured extensively on the international jazz scene, performing both jazz and rock concerts, and on a series of recordings on his own Jazzland label. He collaborated with a series of artists in this period, such as guitarists Terje Rypdal and Jon Eberson, and in the mid-1990s, he toured and recorded the album Billy Cobham presents Nordic – Off Color, released in 1999, together with Billy Cobham. For many years, he also collaborated with experimental jazz vocalist Sidsel Endresen and was in the lineup for her commissioned work at Moldejazz in 1993, which was released on the album Exile a year later. His own commissioned work A Little War Story for Vossajazz was also performed in 1993.

Wesseltoft formed his own band, New Conception of Jazz, in 1995, and their first album, New Conception of Jazz, was awarded a Spellemannprisen in 1996, the same year it was released.

Firmly committed to electronic music, Wesseltoft completely eschews acoustic forms and is just as adamant that he will not be tied by genre boundaries, bringing hip hop and other contemporary dance music forms into his concept of contemporary jazz. On the album Sharing (1998), many listeners were taken by surprise by his extensive use of club DJs and scratchers.

His track "Existence" can be heard in Philippe Harel's movie Extension du domaine de la lutte, an adaptation of Michel Houellebecq's 1994 novel.

After working with Dan Berglund on his 2014 album Trialogue, Wesseltoft founded the jazz trio Rymden, adding Magnus Öström on drums. They had their first appearance at the Nattjazz Festival in Bergen in 2017. According to Wesseltoft, they began work on a debut album after this successful performance. Further appearances followed in 2017 and 2018, and in 2019, Rymden recorded their first album, Reflections & Odysseys.

John Kellman of All About Jazz magazine noted Wesseltoft's solo performance at The Punkt Festival, Kristiansand, Norway, as one of his 25 "Best Live Shows of 2013".

== Honors ==
- Smugetprisen (1996)
- Spellemannprisen in the jazz category, for the album New Conception of Jazz (1996)
- Kongsberg Jazz Award (1997)
- Spellemannprisen, together with Sidsel Endresen, in the jazz category, for the album Duplex Ride (1998)
- Gammleng-prisen in the jazz category (1999)
- Spellemannprisen in the open category, for the album Out here. In there. (2002)
- Buddyprisen, awarded by The Norwegian Jazz Forum (2004)

== Selected discography ==
=== Solo ===
- It's Snowing on My Piano (1997)
- New Conception of Jazz (1997)
- Sharing (1998)
- New Conception of Jazz: Moving (2001)
- New Conception of Jazz Live (2003)
- New Conception of Jazz: Film Ing (2004)
- IM (2007)
- New Conceptions of Jazz (2008)
- Songs (2011)
- Last Spring (2012)
- Trialogue (2014)
- OK World (2014)
- Bugge & Friends (2015)
- Everybody Loves Angels (2017)
- Bugge Wesseltoft & Prins Thomas (2018)
- Be Am (2022)

=== With Rymden ===
- Reflections & Odysseys (2019)
- Space Sailors (2020)
- Live In Umeå (2020 – From a live performance at the Umeå Jazz Festival in October 2019)

=== Collaborations ===
With Finn Coren

- The Blake Project: Spring (1997)
- The Blake Project: Spring: The Appendix (1998)
- Lovecloud (1999)

With Jan Eggum

- Dacapo (1990)
- Underveis (1991)
- Nesten Ikke Tilstede (1993)
- Deilig (1999)
- Kjaerlighet & AErlighet 2 (2011)

With Bjorn Eidsvag

- Til Alle Tider (1992)
- Landet Lenger Bak (1995)
- Rundt Neste Sving (2010)

With Sidsel Endresen

- Exile (1994)
- Nightsong (1994)
- Duplex Ride (1998)
- Undertow (2000)
- Out Here. In There. (2002)

With Laurent Garnier

- The Cloud Making Machine (2004)
- The Cloud Making Machine Reworks (2005)
- Retrospective (2006)
- Public Outburst (2007)

With Knut Reiersrud

- Soul of a Man (1998)
- Sub (1999)
- Gitar (2009)

With Oystein Sunde

- Du Ma'kke Komme Her Og Komme Her (1994)
- Sann Er'e Bare (2005)
- Bestefar (2016)

With Vamp

- Godmorgen, Soster (1993)
- Horisonter (1994)
- 13 Humler (1996)
- Flua Pa Veggen (1998)
- St. Mandag (2008)

With others

- Dollie de Luxe, Which Witch (1987)
- Hanne Krogh, Hanne (1989)
- Arild Andersen, Sagn (1990)
- Olav Stedje, Ei Gave Til Deg (1990)
- Jan Garbarek, I Took Up the Runes (1990)
- Lava, The Rhythm of Love (1990)
- Jorn Hoel, Kjaerlighetens Teater (1991)
- Eero Koivistoinen, Altered Things (1992)
- Tore Brunborg, Tid (1993)
- Kenneth Sivertsen, Remembering North (1993)
- The Monroes, Long Way Home (1993)
- Kjetil Saunes, Lystyv (1993)
- Knut Vaernes, Roneo (1993)
- Arild Andersen, Arv (1994)
- Maj Britt Andersen, Rippel Rappel (1994)
- Dance with a Stranger, Look What You've Done (1994)
- Rick Danko, Ridin' on the Blinds (1994)
- Dennis Gonzalez, Welcome to Us (1994)
- Jens Wendelboe, Big Crazy Energy Band Vol. 2 (1994)
- Anne Grete Preus, Millimeter (1994)
- Marilyn Mazur, Circular Chant (1995)
- Knut Vaernes, Jacques Tati (1995)
- Di Derre, Gym (1996)
- Billy Cobham, Nordic (1996)
- Bendik Hofseth, Planets, Rivers and...Ikea (1996)
- Tim Scott, Everywhere I've Been (1996)
- Unni Wilhelmsen, To Whom It May Concern (1996)
- Jon Eberson, Thirteen Rounds (1997)
- Marlui Miranda, 2 IHU Kewere: Rezar (1997)
- Unni Wilhelmsen, Definitely Me (1997)
- Audun Kleive, Bitt (1997)
- Eivind Aarset, Electronique Noire (1998)
- Bertine Zetlitz, Morbid Latenight Show (1998)
- Torbjorn Sunde, Meridians (1998)
- Bengt-Arne Wallin, The Birth and Re-Birth of Swedish Folk Jazz (1998)
- Jan Garbarek, Rites (1998)
- Gilberto Gil, O Sol De Oslo (1998)
- Katia Cardenal, Canta Alf Proysen: Navegas Por Las Costas (1999)
- Lars Lillo-Stenberg, Oslo, (2000)
- Kirsten Bråten Berg, Syng Du Mi Royst (2001)
- Jon Eberson, Dreams That Went Astray (2001)
- Mari Boine, Eight Seasons: Gavcci Jahkejuogu (2002)
- Tore Brunborg, Gravity (2003)
- Joyce, Just a Little Bit Crazy (2003)
- Dhafer Youssef, Digital Prophecy (2003)
- Torun Eriksen, Glittercard (2004)
- Erik Wesseltoft, Con Amor (2004)
- Beady Belle, Closer (2005)
- Torun Eriksen, Prayers & Observations (2005)
- Nils Petter Molvaer, Remakes (2005)
- Lars Danielsson, Melange Bleu (2006)
- Ola Kvernberg, Night Driver (2006)
- Mike Mainieri, Northern Lights (2006)
- Mungolian Jet Set, Beauty Came to Us in Stone (2006)
- Terje Rypdal, Vossabrygg (2006)
- Malika Makouf Rasmussen, Cairo (2006)
- Nils Landgren, Christmas with My Friends (2007)
- Knut Buen, Tonebod (2008)
- Baba Zula, Gecekondu (2010)
- Gitarkameratene, Typisk Norsk (2010)
- Caecilie Norby, Arabesque (2010)
- Ost & Kjex, Cajun Lunch (2010)
- Paolo Vinaccia, Very Much Alive (2010)
- Susanne Lundeng, Mot (2011)
- Henrik Schwarz, Duo (2011)
- Wax Poetic, On a Ride (2012)
- Aslak Hartberg, The Dancer (2013)
- Erik Wesseltoft, To Someone I Knew (2013)
- Eva Kruse, In Water (2014)
- Solveig Slettahjell, Jazz at Berlin Philharmonic I Norwegian Woods (2014)
- Henrik Schwarz, Dan Berglund, Trialogue (2014)
- Lisa Dillan, Change of Habit (2015)
- Tore Johansen, Earth Stills (2015)
- Ost & Kjex, Freedom Wig (2015)
- Beady Belle, On My Own (2016)
- Prins Thomas, Bugge Wesseltoft Versions (2016)
- radio.string.quartet.vienna, In Between Silence (2017)
- Michael Krohn, Sovnlose Netter (2018)
- Henrik Schwarz, Scripted Orkestra (2018)
- Prins Thomas, Ambitions (2019)
- Henrik Schwarz, "In Spite of Everything" (single – 2020)
- Henrik Schwarz, Duo II (2022)

Awards
| Preceded by Vigleik Storaas Trio | Recipient of the Jazz Spellemannprisen; 1996 | Succeeded by Vigleik Storaas Trio |
| Preceded by Nils Petter Molvær | Recipient of the Kongsberg Jazz Award; 1997 | Succeeded by Sidsel Endresen |
| Preceded by Nils Petter Molvær | Recipient of the Open class Spellemannprisen; 1998 | Succeeded by Krøyt |
| Preceded by Nils Petter Molvær | Recipient of the Jazz Gammleng-prisen; 1999 | Succeeded by Kristin Asbjørnsen |
| Preceded by Anja Garbarek | Recipient of the Open class Spellemannprisen; 2002 | Succeeded by Niko Valkeapää |
| Preceded by Nils Petter Molvær | Recipient of the Buddyprisen; 2004 | Succeeded by Arve Henriksen |
