= Øystein Sevåg =

Norwegian composer and keyboardist

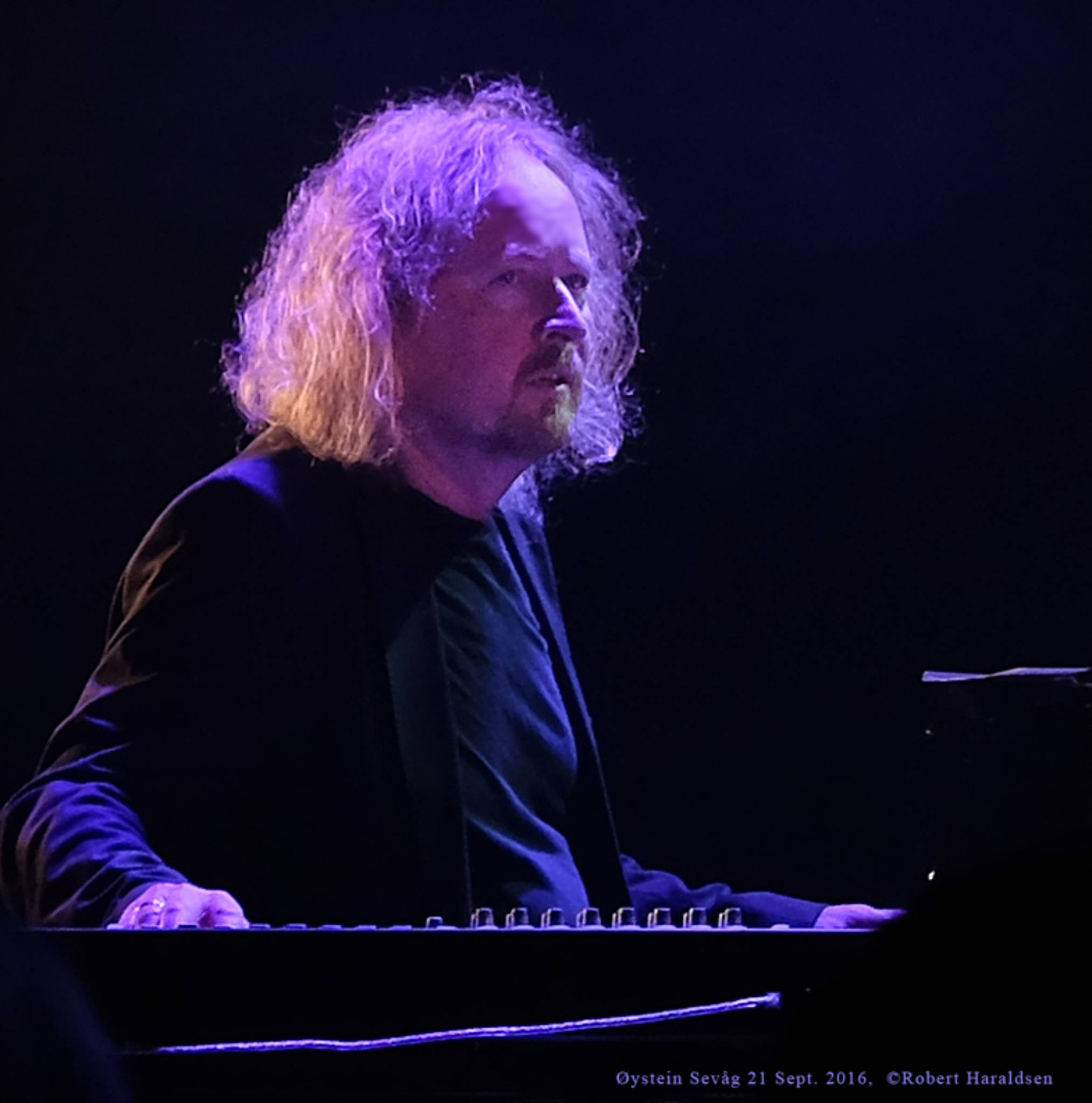

Background information
- Born: March 19, 1957 (age 68); Bærum, Akershus, Norway
- Genres: Contemporary classical, jazz, world
- Occupation(s): Musician, composer, record producer
- Instrument(s): Piano, flute
- Years active: 1983–present
- Labels: Windham Hill, Hearts of Space, Siddharta
- Website: www.sevag.com

Øystein Sevåg (born March 19, 1957) is a Norwegian composer and keyboardist. His music touches on classical, New Age and jazz styles.

== Biography ==
Øystein Sevåg is a Norwegian composer, pianist and music producer. He was born in Bærum in 1957, beginning piano lessons at age five. As a teen he played bass in a rock band but returned to his classical roots in time to study piano, flute and composition at a private Music Conservatory in Oslo; by the 1980s, however, Sevåg had become fascinated by the possibilities offered by the development of the synthesizer, and he plunged into electronic music with his self-released 1989 debut LP Close Your Eyes and See.

The product of five years in the studio, the album slowly crept into Billboard's New Age charts in the USA, and it landed Sevåg on the Windham Hill label to issue the follow-up, 1993's Link. He returned two years later with Global House, a record reflecting a newfound interest in acoustic sounds and worldbeat textures, including didgeridoo and string quartet; the ambient album Visual, a collaboration with guitarist Lakki Patey, followed in 1996. Signing to Hearts of Space Records, Sevåg resurfaced in 1997 with the acclaimed Bridge, with the London Philharmonia Orchestra, winning the Indie Award in the USA for the best new age recording of the year.

From 1999 to 2005, he lived in Freiburg, South Germany, where among other things he worked on music therapy together with Maria Sevag and the psychologist Katharina Martin.

In April 2005, Sevåg's new album Caravan was released, 8 years after his previous album Bridge. The new material was introduced on a concert in Oslo in March. In June one of his new compositions in the classical area - a string trio - had its first performance on Casa dei Mezzo Music Festival on Crete, Greece, and in April 2006 in Madrid. In October 2005 he had two concerts in Norway with his "Global House Band" - followed up by ten small solo concerts at the Vigeland Mausoleum in Oslo.

In the spring 2006 Øystein Sevåg moved to Oslo. He produced singer/songwriter Eliksir's debut album Earthly Things, released in 2007. His latest album Based on a True Story was released in 2007. In February 2006 he met the singer/songwriter Benedicte Torget, and worked with her as a co-producer, arranger and piano player on her debut album After a Day of Rain, released in August 2008.

In April 2010 he released his studio album The Red Album collaborating with Peter Wettre, Bendik Hofseth, Andreas Bye, Paolo Vinaccia, Ole Marius Melhuus, Zotora Nygard, Sara Övinge, Audun Erlien and Eivind Aarset.

In March 2012 Øystein Sevåg released the album Space For a Crowded World - as mentioned on his official website, the "most ambient album since Visual."

Sevåg married Benedicte Torget in June 2018.

== Discography ==
=== Albums ===
- 1989: Close Your Eyes and See
- 1993: Link
- 1995: Global House
- 1997: Bridge (Hearts of Space)
- 2005: Caravan
- 2007: Based on a True Story
- 2010: The Red Album
- 2012: Space for a Crowded World
- 2025: (October) Lacrimosa

=== Collaborations ===
- 1996: Visual with Lakki Patey
- 2003: Amor Fati with Kristin Flood - English and Norwegian version
- 2007: Eliksir: Earthly Things - producer
- 2008: Benedicte Torget: After a Day of Rain - coproducer, piano player, arranger
- 2011: Anette Askvik: Liberty - producer, piano player, arranger
- 2014: Karin Boye sånger (Present Recordings) - composer, pianist; with Benedicte Torget (vocals)
- 2024: Visual 2 - acoustic duoalbum with Lakki Patey (Siddhartha Records)
