= Nils Petter Molvær =

Norwegian trumpeter, composer, and record producer (born 1960)

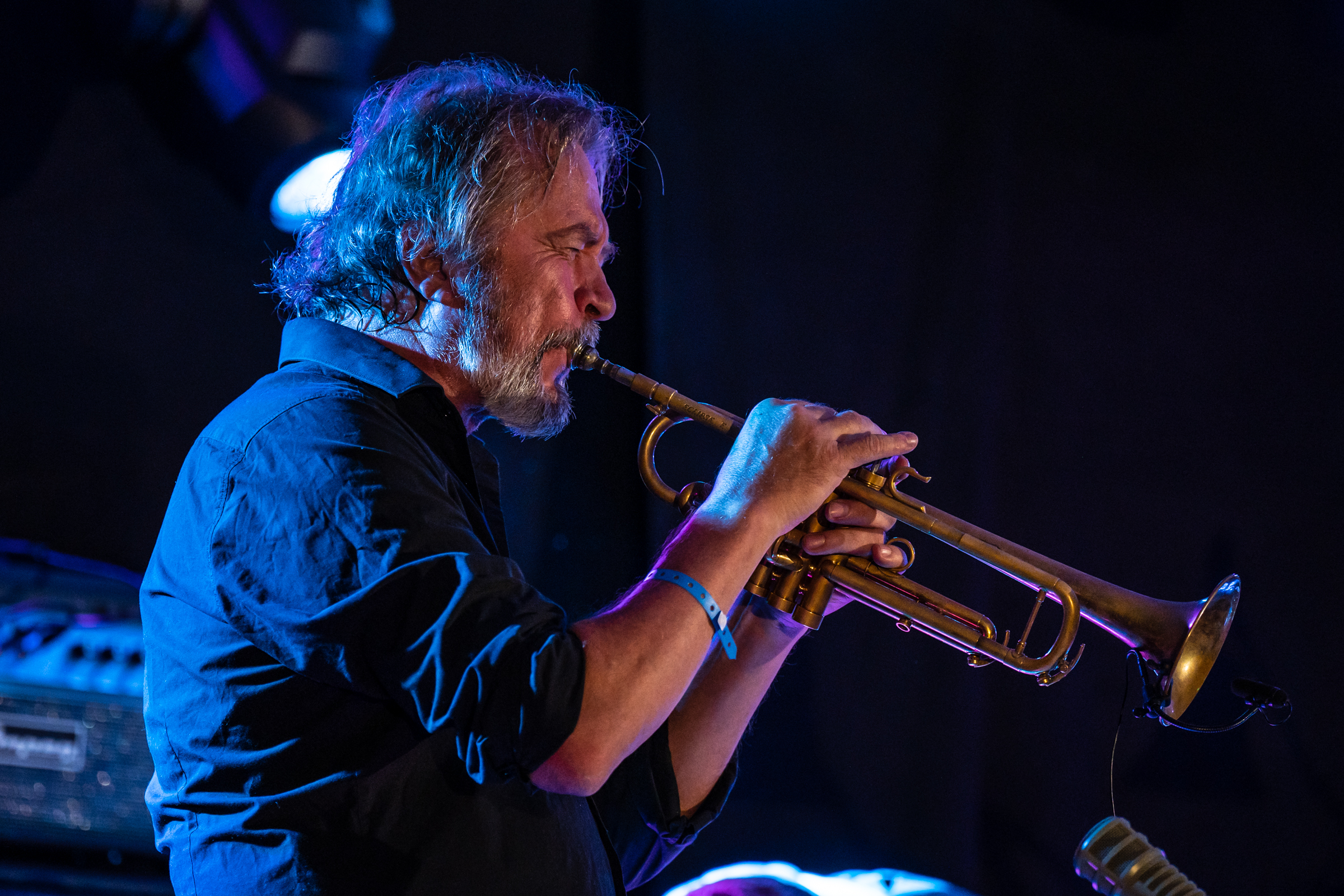

Background information
- Born: 18 September 1960 (age 65); Langevåg, Møre og Romsdal, Norway
- Genres: Jazz; future jazz; jazz fusion; electronica
- Occupations: Musician; composer
- Instrument: Trumpet
- Label: ECM
- Website: www.nilspettermolvaer.com

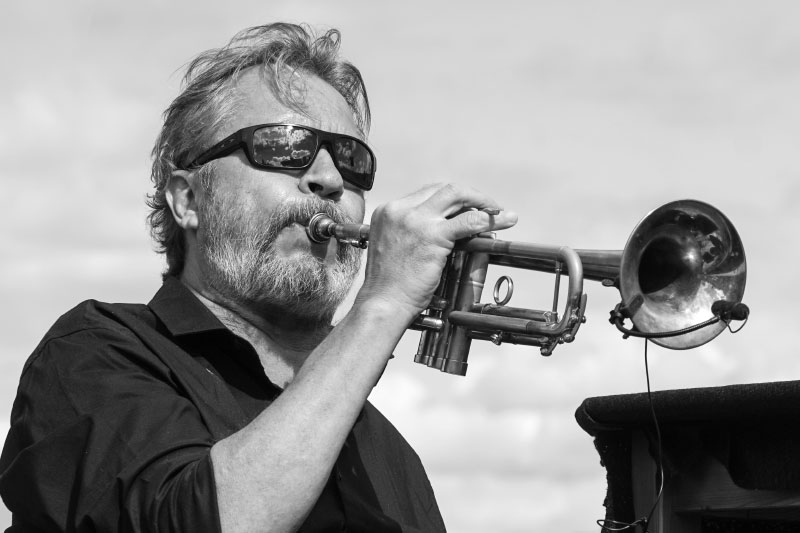
Norway 2020 Photo Hreinn Gudlaugsson

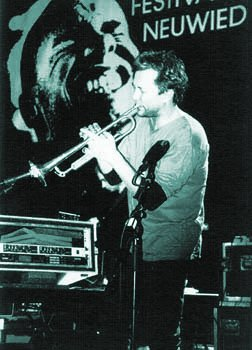
Molvær in Neuwied, Germany, 2011

Nils Petter Molvær (Norwegian pronunciation: [ˈmɔ̂ɫvæːr]), also known as NPM (born 18 September 1960), is a Norwegian jazz trumpeter, composer, and record producer. He is considered a pioneer of future jazz, a genre that fuses jazz and electronic music, best showcased on his most commercially successful album, Khmer.

== Biography ==
Molvær was born and raised on the island of Sula, Møre og Romsdal, Norway, and left at age nineteen to study on the Jazz program at Trondheim Musikkonservatorium (1980–82). He joined the bands Jazzpunkensemblet with Jon Eberson and Masqualero, alongside Arild Andersen, Jon Christensen and Tore Brunborg. Masqualero (named after a Wayne Shorter composition originally recorded by Miles Davis) recorded several albums for ECM Records, and Molvær recorded with other ECM artists before his 1997 debut solo album, Khmer. The record was a fusion of jazz, rock, electronic soundscapes, and hip-hop beats – and quite unlike the delicate "chamber jazz" typically associated with ECM. Molvær's muted trumpet sound, sometimes electronically processed, had an obvious debt to Miles Davis's work of the 1970s and 1980s, but without being a slavish copy. For the first time, ECM released singles: "Song of Sand", backed with three remixes, and "Ligotage". In 2000, a second album followed, Solid Ether, after which Molvær left ECM. He has recorded several albums since, and has also produced film and theater music.

He often works with guitarist Eivind Aarset. He has also played with Tabla Beat Science, created by Zakir Hussain and Bill Laswell.

== Honors ==
- 1996: Kongsberg Jazz Award
- 1997: Spellemannprisen in the Open class
- 1998: Gammleng-prisen in the class Jazz
- 1996: Kongsberg Jazz Award
- 2000: Spellemannprisen in the Open class
- 2003: Buddyprisen
- 2005: Spellemannprisen in the Open class

== Discography ==
=== In Masqualero ===
- 1983.10 – Masqualero – Odin Records (1983) (Arild Andersen, Jon Christensen, Jon Balke, Tore Brunborg, Nils Petter Molvær)
- 1985.08 – Bande À Part – ECM Records (1986) (Arild Andersen, Jon Christensen, Jon Balke, Tore Brunborg, Nils Petter Molvær)
- 1987.11 – Aero – ECM Records (1988) (Arild Andersen, Jon Christensen, Tore Brunborg, Nils Petter Molvær)
- 1989.12 – Re-Enter – ECM Records (1990) (Arild Andersen, Jon Christensen, Tore Brunborg, Nils Petter Molvær)

=== Solo ===
- 1996.04 – Khmer – ECM Records (1997) (Eivind Aarset, Morten Mølster, Roger Ludvigsen, Rune Arnesen)
- 1998 – Khmer: The Remixes – ECM Records (1998)
- 1998 – Ligotage – ECM Records (1998)
- 1999 – Solid Ether – ECM Records (2000) (Sidsel Endresen, Eivind Aarset, Audun Kleive, DJ Strangefruit)
- 2001 – Recoloured – EmArcy (2001)
- 2002 – NP3 – EmArcy (2002) (Eivind Aarset, Audun Kleive, Rune Arnesen, Raymond Pellicer)
- 2002.09 – Streamer – Sula Records (2004)(Eivind Aarset, Audun Kleive, Rune Arnesen, DJ Strangefruit, Jan Bang) (Thirsty Ear Recs - 2006)
- 2004 – Er – Sula Records (2005) (Eivind Aarset, Jan Bang, Rune Arnesen, Helge Norbakken)
- 2005 – Edy (Bande Original du Film) – Sula Records (2005) (Eivind Aarset, Jan Bang, Rune Arnesen)
- 2005 – Remakes – Sula Records (2005)
- 2005 – An American Compilation – Thirsty Ear (2005)
- 2007 – Re-Vision – ECM Records (2008) (Eivind Aarset, Jan Bang, Audun Kleive)
- 2009 – Hamada – Thirsty Ear / Sula Records (2009) (Eivind Aarset, Audun Kleive, Jan Bang)
- 2011 – Baboon Moon – Sula Records / Sony Music (2011) (Stian Westerhus, Erland Dahlen)
- 2014 – Switch – OKeh Records (2014) (Geir Sundstøl, Erland Dahlen, Jo Berger Myhre)
- 2016 – Buoyancy – OKeh Records (2016) (Geir Sundstøl, Jo Berger Myhre, Erland Dahlen)
- 2020 – Stitches – Modern Recordings (2021) (Jo Berger Myhre, Erland Dahlen, Johan Lindström)
- 2023.05 – KHMER Live in Bergen – Sula Records (2025) (Eivind Aarset, Audun Kleive, Rune Arnesen, Jan Bang, DJ Strangefruit)

=== Collaborations ===
- 1990: So I Write, with Sidsel Endresen, Django Bates, Jon Christensen
- 1995: Hastening Westward, with Robyn Schulkowsky
- 1997: Small Labyrinths (recorded 1994), in Marilyn Mazur's Future Song
- 2005: Electra, in Arild Andersen Group
- 2008: Corps Electriques, with Hector Zazou/KatieJane Garside, Bill Rieflin, Lone Kent
- 2013: 1/1, with Moritz von Oswald
- 2015: Infolding, in Spin Marvel (Martin France - drums, Tim Harries - bass, Terje Evensen - live electronics, Nils Petter Molvaer - trumpet, Emre Ramazanoglu - production and further drums)
- 2015: Høst: Autumn Fall (OST), with Mapping Oceans
- 2018: Nordub, with Sly & Robbie
- 2019: Music for Paintings, with Terje Evensen, Leo Abrahams, Anna Stereopoulou, Anthony Cox, Manongo Mujica
- 2023: The Harmony Codex with Steven Wilson
- 2024: Liminal Animals with Ulver

=== As featured artist ===
- 1990: Nonsentration - Jon Balke
- 1992: Night Caller - Rita Marcotulli
- 1993: Exile - Sidsel Endresen
- 1997: Brytningstid - Kenneth Sivertsen
- 1998: Électronique Noire - Eivind Aarset
- 2001: Radioaxiom: A Dub Transmission - Bill Laswell & Jah Wobble
- 2003: Digital Prophecy - Dhafer Youssef
- 2004: Seafarer's Song - Ketil Bjørnstad
- 2006: Mélange Bleu - Lars Danielsson
- 2007: A Pure Land - Sienná
- 2007: Ataraxis - Deeyah
- 2007: 23 Wheels of Dharma - Somma
- 2008: Dome - Johannes Enders
- 2008: Lodge - Fanu & Bill Laswell
- 2012: Manu Katché - Manu Katché
- 2015: Deeper Green - Christof May
- 2017: Hypersomniac - Lef
- 2019: Hyperuranion - Chat Noir
- 2021: Roses of Neurosis - Sivert Høyem

== Also appears on ==
- Beginner's Guide to Scandinavia (3CD, Nascente 2011)

Awards
Preceded by First award in 1996	Recipient of the Kongsberg Jazz Award; 1996	Succeeded by Bugge Wesseltoft
Preceded by Mari Boine	Recipient of the Open class Spellemannprisen; 1997	Succeeded by Sidsel Endresen & Bugge Wesseltoft
Preceded by Bjørn Johansen	Recipient of the Jazz Gammleng-prisen; 1998	Succeeded by Bugge Wesseltoft
Preceded by Krøyt	Recipient of the Open class Spellemannprisen; 2000	Succeeded by Anja Garbarek
Preceded by Jon Eberson	Recipient of the Buddyprisen; 2003	Succeeded by Bugge Wesseltoft
Preceded by Frode Fjellheim	Recipient of the Open class Spellemannprisen; 2005	Succeeded by Hanne Hukkelberg
Preceded by Alfred Janson	Recipient of the «Open class» Edvardprisen; 2010	Succeeded by Johan Sara
Preceded by Team Hegdal	Recipient of the Jazz Spellemannprisen; 2016	Succeeded by Hegge
