= Jazzland Recordings =

Norwegian jazz record label (founded 1996)

- Founded: 1996
- Founder: Bugge Wesseltoft
- Genre: Jazz
- Country of origin: Norway
- Location: Oslo
- Official website: jazzlandrec.com

Jazzland Recordings is a Norwegian jazz and improvised music label based in Oslo, Norway, often associated with nu jazz.

It was founded in 1996 by pianist Bugge Wesseltoft to release his "New Conception of Jazz" and operate as a standalone label. There were three divisions of the Jazzland: "Jazzland", "Grüner", and "Acoustic", but these were dropped.

== Roster ==
- Greta Aagre and Erik Honoré
- Eivind Aarset
- Atomic
- Jon Balke
- Jan Bang
- Beady Belle
- Mari Kvien Brunvoll
- Come Shine
- The Core
- Jon Eberson
- Sidsel Endresen
- Endresen/Wesseltoft Duo
- Torun Eriksen
- Ingebrigt Håker Flaten
- Frøydis Grorud
- Tuva Halse
- Humvee
- Patrick Shaw Iversen & Raymond Pellicer
- Maria Kannegaard
- Audun Kleive
- Håkon Kornstad
- Ola Kvernberg
- Lord Kelvin
- Merriwinkle
- Mopti
- Motif
- Mungolian Jet Set
- Punkt
- Javid Afsari Rad
- Live Maria Roggen
- Samsa'Ra
- Shining
- Stein Urheim and Mari Kvien Brunvoll
- Rob Van De Wouw
- Paolo Vinaccia
- Bugge Wesseltoft
- Bugge Wesseltoft and Henrik Schwarz
- Wibutee
- Håvard Wiik
- Dhafer Youssef
