= Eivind Aarset =

Norwegian guitarist and composer (born 1961)

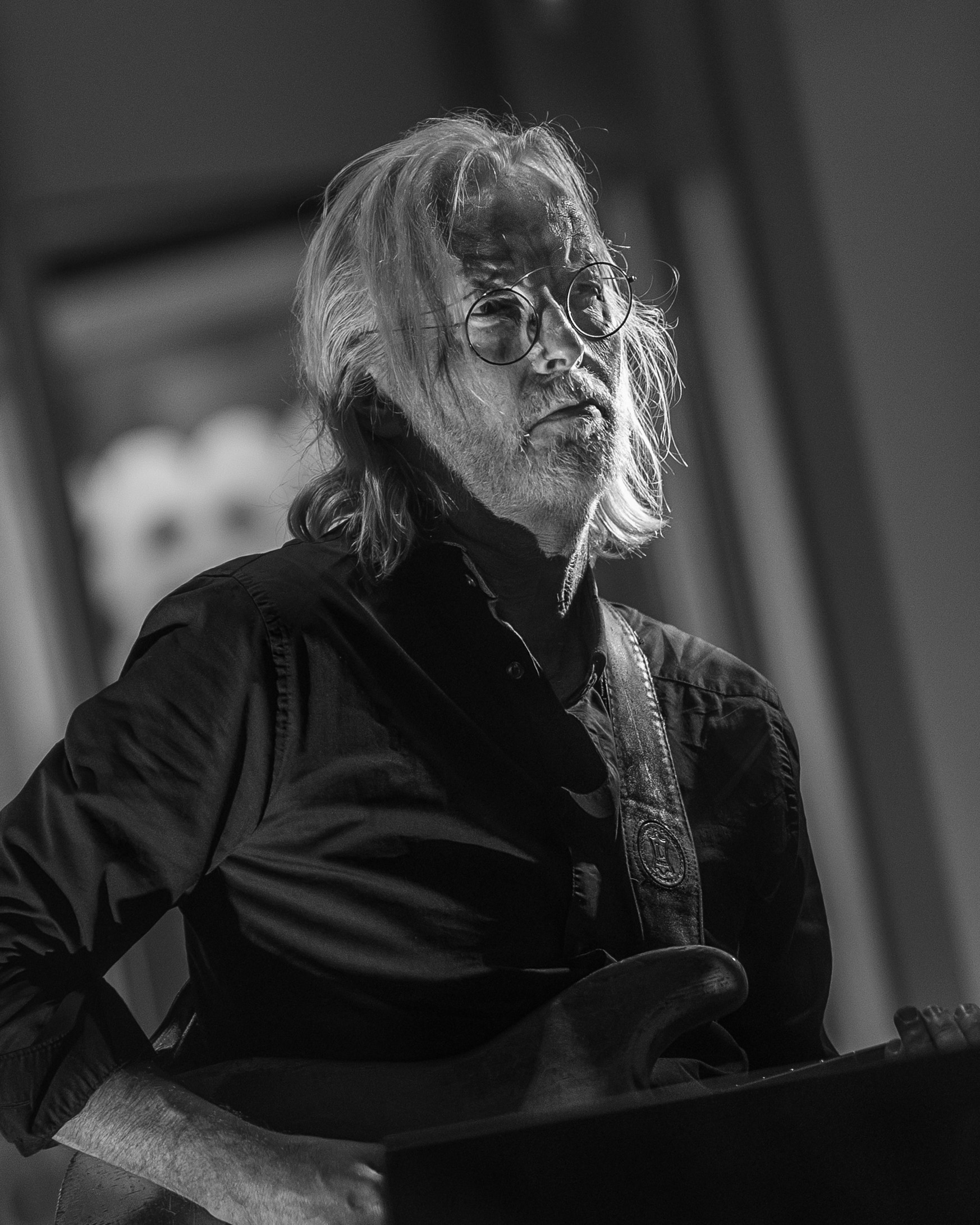
- Aarset performing in 2025

Background information
- Born: 23 March 1961 (age 65); Kolbotn, Oppegård, Akershus, Norway
- Genres: Nu jazz; electronic
- Occupation: Musician
- Instrument: Guitar
- Years active: 1990s–present
- Label: Jazzland
- Website: eivindaarset.com

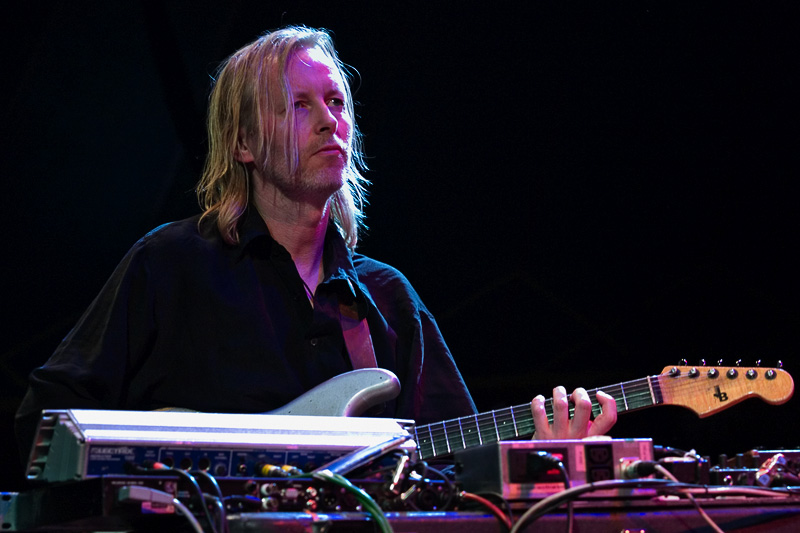
Eivind Aarset at Moers Festival, Germany, 2006

Eivind Aarset (born 23 March 1961) is a Norwegian guitarist and composer. His style has been associated with nu jazz and electronic music, and often makes extensive use of effects to process his guitar.

In addition to his work as a bandleader, Aarset has worked with Ray Charles, Dee Dee Bridgewater, Ute Lemper, Ketil Bjørnstad, Andy Sheppard, Mike Mainieri, Arild Andersen, Abraham Laboriel, Dhafer Youssef, Django Bates, and Nils Petter Molvaer. Aarset is married to Norwegian singer Anne-Marie Giørtz.

== Biography ==
Aarset has worked with Nils Petter Molvær, Bill Laswell, Jon Hassell, Jan Garbarek, David Sylvian, and Marilyn Mazur.

After several albums for Jazzland, he recorded Dream Logic for ECM (2012), collaborating with Jan Bang and Erik Honoré on the production and timbral design of melodies and soundscapes.

At the 2013 Punkt Festival in Kristiansand, Norway, he accompanied Arve Henriksen, Jan Bang, Erik Honoré, and Ingar Zach, celebrating the release of Narrative from the Subtropics by Jan Bang and Places of Worship by Arve Henriksens, in addition to performing a special "Dream Logic" concert with Jan Bang, Audun Erlien, Wetle Holte and Erland Dahlen.

John Kellman at All About Jazz named Eivind Aarset Dream Logic's appearance at Punktfestivalen, Kristiansand, Norway in September 2013 one of the 25 Best Live Shows of 2013.

== Artistic career ==
Aarset's debut solo album, Électronique Noire, was described by The New York Times as "one of the best electro-jazz albums since Miles." His most recent album, Connected, was released in May 2004. He has recorded more than 150 albums with renowned artists including Ray Charles, Dee Dee Bridgewater, Mike Mainieri, Oti Limper, Ketil Bjørnstad, Arild Andersen, and Abraham Laboriel. Arsette calls his music "new jazz" and is a pioneering voice in electronica.

== Selected discography ==
- Électronique Noire (1998)
- Light Extracts (2001)
- Connected (2004)
- Sonic Codex (2007)
- Live Extracts (2010)
- Dream Logic (2012)
- I.E. (2015)
- Atmospheres Hamasyan/Henriksen/Aarset/Bang (2016)
- The Height of the Reeds Henriksen/Aarset/Bang/French (2018)
- Dark Star Safari Bang/Honoré/Aarset/Rohrer (2019)
- Lost River Rabbia/Petrella/Aarset (2019)
- Snow Catches on Her Eyelashes (2020)
- Walk Through Lightly Dark Star Safari (2021)
- Phantasmagoria, or A Different Kind of Journey Eivind Aarset 4tet (2021)
- Strange Hands Eivind Aarset 4tet (2026)
