= Norsk Jazzforum =

Norwegian jazz organization

Norsk Jazzforum or The Norwegian Jazz Forum (originally established in 1953, and later reappeared on June 8, 1997 in Oslo, when The Norwegian Jazz Federation and Association Norwegian Jazz Musicians fused into The Norwegian Jazz Forum) is a member and interest organization that gathers the Norwegian jazz community, and works to promote the Norwegian jazz in terms of cultural policy and the arts.

== Biography ==
The Norwegian Jazz Forum was established in 1997 by the merger of 'Norsk Jazzforbund' (established 1953) and 'Foreningen Norske Jazzmusikere'. A former Norwegian Jazz Forum existed in the 60's, when Karin Krog took an initiative to give the Norwegian jazz community a voice. Today's Jazz Forum organizes jazz clubs, jazz festivals, amateur big band, professional jazz musicians and jazz five regional centers in Norway.

Norwegian Jazz Forum has extensive dissemination. For the 50th anniversary was responsible for the Milestones in Jazz, a tour led by Knut Borge with a band. The continuation of Odin Records (established in 1981) that fused into Curling Legs in 1993, as well as the Buddyprisen that since 1956 has been awarded to the jazz musician of the year. Jazz forum also awards the Jazz Club of the Year («årets jazzklubb») in Norway. Since 1979, they organized "summer courses in jazz improvisation" on Agder Folk High School. With Rikskonsertene and jazz festivals in Norway, it holds the «Jazzintro», a competition that selects the newcomer of the year on the Norwegian jazz scene, «This year's young jazz musicians», awarded during the Moldejazz every second year.

In addition the Norwegian Jazz Forum distributes funds ad hoc, as Frifond, a band or musician scholarship. The Jazz Magazine Jazznytt is published by the Norwegian Jazz Forum. Managing Director in 2005 and 2011 was Tore Flesjø. Starting in 2004, they started to crown a jazz club of the year. Winners were located in Ørsta/Volda (2004), Horten (2005), Stavanger (2006), Sortland (2007), Bergen (2008), Tromsø (2009), Asker (2010), Arendal (2011), Jazz Evidence in Kongsberg (2012), and Barnas Jazzhus in Ski (2013).

== Awards ==
Jazzintro

- 1998: Awarded the band Urban Connection, including Steinar Raknes (upright bass), Håkon Mjåset Johansen (drums) & Frode Nymo (saxophone)
- 2000: Awarded the band Ra including Ronny Andreassen (saxophones), Morten Qvenild (Fender Rhodes), Ole Jørn Myklebust (trompet), Kjetil Lunde (guitar), Karl-Erik Rønsen (bass), Erlend Lygren (drums), Stig Værnes (trommer) & Andreas Veire (sound).

The finale at Moldejazz included Mewenner, B.W.M, Motif, Mandala, Tore Johansen, Taurus People & ZeeBop

- 2002: Awarded the band Solid!.

The finale at Moldejazz included Heidi Skjerve Quartet (Kjetil Eide, Ole Morten Vågan & Truls Rønning)

- 2004: Awarded the band In The Country, in a finale including Magic Pocket (Hayden Powell, Erik Johannessen, Daniel Herskedal & Erik Nylander), Kobert & Alf Wilhelm Lundberg Trio (including Andreas Amundsen & Ole-Thomas Kolberg)
- 2006: Awarded the band Puma including Øystein Moen - keyboards/electronics, Stian Westerhus - gitarer/maskiner & Gard Nilssen - percussion/sampling.

The finale at Moldejazz included ELMER (Hayden Powell, Espen Bjarnar, Jo Skansaar and Kristoffer Alberts), People Are Machines (Magnus Hjorth, Petter Eldh and Anton Eger) and Supersonic Rocketship (Dag Erik Knedal Andersen, Jørgen Mathisen, Even Helte Hermanssen and Ola Høyer

- 2008: Awarded the band Albatrosh including Eyolf Dale (piano) & André Roligheten (saxophone).

The finale at Moldejazz included Revolver! & Flux

- 2010: Awarded the duo Ferner/Juliusson, with Per Arne Ferner (Oslo) – guitar & Per Gunnar Juliusson (Linköping) - piano.

The finale at Moldejazz included MotSol (Ståle Liavik Solberg & Stine Janvin Motland), Steinar Aadnekvam Quartet, & FairFist (Bendik «G.» Andersson, Eva B. Haugen, Jan K. Hovland, Gunnar «Z.» Hågbo & Theodor B. Onarheim)

- 2012: Awarded the band Mopti including Christian Meaas Svendsen (Kongsberg) – upright bass, Andreas Wildhagen (Oslo) – drums, David Aleksander Sjølie (Kløfta) – guitar, Kristoffer Eikrem (Molde) – trumpet & Harald Lassen (Songdalen) – saxophone.

The finale at Moldejazz included the bands Duplex (Harald Lassen & Christian Meaas Svendsen), Hanna Paulsberg Concept (including Trygve Waldemar Fiske, Hans Hulbækmo & Oscar Grönberg), and Knyst! (Kasper Skullerud Værnes, Christian Meaas Svendsen & Andreas Wildhagen)
