= 2011 in Norwegian music =

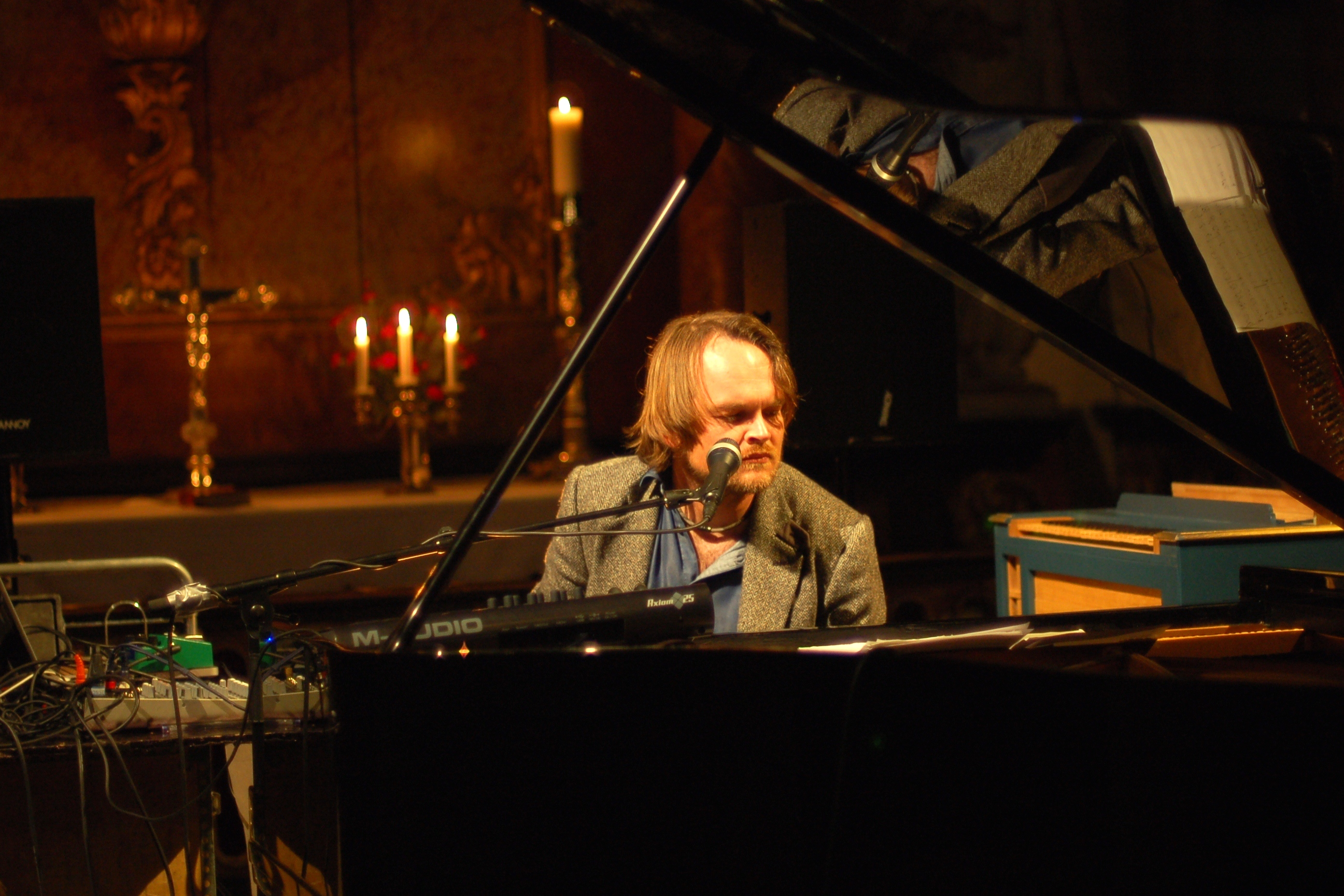
Morten Qvenild during a Solo concert at Kongsberg Church April 2011.

The following is a list of notable events and releases of the year 2011 in Norwegian music.

== Events ==
=== January ===
- 26 – The very first Bodø Jazz Open started in Bodø (January 26–29).
- 28
  - Nordlysfestivalen started in Tromsø (January 28 – February 5).
  - Marit Sandvik (vocals) was awarded the Nordlysprisen 2011 at Nordlysfestivalen.

=== February ===
- 3 – The Polarjazz Festival 2011 started in Longyearbyen (February 3 – 7).
- 9 – Kristiansund Opera Festival opened (February 9 – 20).

=== April ===
- 15 – Vossajazz starts in Voss (April 15–17).
- 16
  - Mari Kvien Brunvoll was awarded Vossajazzprisen 2011.
  - Mathias Eick performs the commissioned work Voss at Vossajazz
- 27
  - Bergenfest 2011 started in Bergen (April 27 – May 1).
  - SoddJazz 2011 started in Inderøy Municipality, Nord-Trøndelag (April 27 – May 1).

=== May ===
- 25
  - The start of Bergen International Music Festival Festspillene i Bergen (May 25 – June 6).
  - Nattjazz starts in Bergen (May 25 – June 4).
- 29 – Jacob Koranyi was awarded the Norwegian Soloist Prize 2011 during Festspillene i Bergen.

=== June ===
- 9 – Norwegian Wood 2011 started in Oslo, Norway (June 9 – 13).

=== July ===
- 18 – Moldejazz starts in Molde (July 18–23).

=== August ===
- 4 – The 24th Notodden Blues Festival started in Notodden (August 4 – 7).
- 10 – Sildajazz starts in Haugesund (August 10–14).
- 12 – Marius Neset is awarded the Sildajazzprisen 2011.
- 15 – Oslo Jazzfestival started (August 15 – 20).

=== September ===
- 1 – Punktfestivalen started in Kristiansand (September 1 – 3).
- 15 – The Ekkofestival started in Bergen (September 23 – October 1).

=== October ===
- 20 – The Insomnia Festival started in Tromsø (October 20 – 22).
- 27 – Marius Neset performs at 'Nasjonal Jazzscene' with the band 'Marius Neset Golde Xplosion' as part of the award 'jazZtipendiat' 2011, including with Magnus Hjort (piano), Peter Eldh (bass), and Martin France (drums).

=== November ===
- 2 – The Oslo World Music Festival started in Oslo, Norway (November 2 – 6).
- 9 – The Vardø Blues Festival (Blues i Vintermørket) started (November 9 – 13).
- 17 – The 6th Barents Jazz, Tromsø International Jazz Festival started (November 17 – 20).

=== December ===
- 11 – The Nobel Peace Prize Concert was held at Telenor Arena.
- 18 – Eldbjørg Raknes was awarded the 2011 Buddyprisen

== Albums released ==
=== February ===
- 7 – Glossolalia by Sigbjørn Apeland (Hubro Music)
- 18 – Viscera by Jenny Hval (Rune Grammofon)

=== March ===
- 11
  - Elastics by Ole Mathisen, Per Mathisen and Paolo Vinaccia (Losen Records).
  - Uleste Bøker Og Utgåtte Sko by Oslo Ess
- 18 – Jeg Vil Hjem Til Menneskene by Susanna Wallumrød (performs lyrics by Gunvor Hofmo)
- 25
  - For Flowers, Cars And Merry Wars by Huntsville
  - La Alarmane Gå by Honningbarna

=== April ===
- 4 – The Shining Of Things by Hanne Boel
- 8 – Roadwork Vol. 4 – Intrepid Skronk by Motorpsycho
- 8 – Early Piano Music by Ketil Bjørnstad
- 15
  - Golden Xplosion by Marius Neset
  - Lysøen – Hommage À Ole Bull by Nils Økland / Sigbjørn Apeland
  - A Day at The Opera by Ivar Antonsen (Ponca Jazz Records).
- 19 – Pressure by Splashgirl

=== May ===
- 24 – Sounds and Sights by In The Country

=== June ===
- 15 – Nord by Tore Johansen, with guest Odd Børretzen reciting ”Nord” by Rolf Jacobsen

=== July ===
- 31 – Release of Tension by Jostein Gulbrandsen Trio.

=== August ===
- 19 – Ha! by Humcrush with Sidsel Endresen
- 22 – Splashgirl/Huntsville: Split by Splashgirl/Huntsville

=== September ===
- 2 – SkyDive by Mats Eilertsen
- 16 – The Attic by Hayden Powell
- 17 – How High is the Sky by Kjersti Stubø (Bolage).
- 23
  - Shoot! by Hedvig Mollestad Trio
  - Yr by Ragnhild Hemsing (Simax Classics)
- 30
  - Liarbird by Ola Kvernberg (Jazzland Recordings), the commissioned work, live from Moldejazz 2010.
  - Fine Together by Roger Johansen feat. Georg Riedel

=== October ===
- 10 – Blackwood by Bjørn Berge
- 14 – Ingen Hverdag by Valkyrien Allstars
- 14 – Alle Skal Få by Stian Around A Hill (Omenås)
- 21 – Yonkers by Albatrosh
- 21 – The Coarse Sand & The Names We Wrote by Jon Eberson Group

=== November ===
- 9 – Live at the BBC by Elephant9
- 11 – Alle Snakker Sant by Siri Nilsen
- 11 – Unemployed by Alog
- 18 – Here Comes Everybody by Atomic.
- 21 – Scent Of Soil by Scent Of Soil

=== December ===
- 2
  - Songs by Bugge Wesseltoft (Jazzland Recordings)
  - Stillness by Hildegunn Øiseth (Losen Records)

=== Unknown date ===
#

F

- Gabriel Fliflet: Åresong

J

- JøKleBa: Jøkleba! / Nu Jøk?

M

- Mural: Live At The Rothko Chapel with Ingar Zach, Kim Myhr and Jim Denley

W

- Petter Wettre & Audun Kleive: The Only Way To Travel 2

== New Artists ==
- Jonas Alaska received the Spellemannprisen award, as 'Best newcomer of the year 2011', for the album Jonas Alaska and was with that also recipient of the Gramo grant.
- Hanna Paulsberg Concept was awarded the 2011 'Young Nordic Jazz Comets' by the Scandinavian Jazz Associations at the Jazz club Fasching in Stockholm, September 10, 2011.

== Deaths ==
January

- 24 – Audun Tylden, record producer (born 1948)

February

- 3 – Eline Nygaard Riisnæs, classical pianist and musicologist (born 1913).

April

- 10 – Børt-Erik Thoresen, television host and folk singer (born 1932).
- 22 – Eyvind Solås, classical pianist, composer, actor, and program host (born 1937).
- 24 – Dag Stokke, rock keyboarder, TNT, church organist and mastering engineer, cancer (born 1967).

May

- 31 – Sølvi Wang, pop and folk singer and actress (born 1929).

July

- 2 – Paul Weeden, American-born jazz guitarist (born 1923)
- 24 – Harald Johnsen, bassist, heart attack, (born 1970).

September

- 4 – Hilde Heltberg, pop and folk singer songwriter, cancer (born 1959).

December

- 1 – Siss Hartmann, pop and musical singer (born 1934)

== See also ==
- 2011 in Norway
- Music of Norway
- Norway in the Eurovision Song Contest 2011
