= The Katabatic Wind =

Studio album by Magic Pocket
- Released: 2011
- Recorded: Athletic Sound, Halden on April 24-25th 2010
- Genre: Contemporary jazz
- Length: 45:40
- Label: Bolage
- Producer: Magic Pocket

The Katabatic Wind (released 2011 in Oslo, Norway by the label Bolage – BLGCD013) is the debut solo piano album by the mini Brass Band Magic Pocket.

== Reception ==
Professional ratings
Review scores
Source	Rating
Dagbladet	5/6 stars
NettAvisen	4/6 stars

The review by Terje Mosnes of the Norwegian newspaper Dagbladet awarded the album 5 stars (dice), and the reviewer Tor Hammerø of the electronic Norwegian newspaper NettAvisen awarded the album 4 stars (dice)

With Morten Qvenild himself on the team as special guest, the ambitions are high. The quartet was recognized in Norway already in 2004, when they won the Jazzintro award, and the musicians shows extreme instrumentalist and composer skills.

== Track listing ==
All compositions as indicated

1. «Call Me Ishmael» (5:28) – Magic Pocket & Qvenild
2. «The Thar Desert » (7:02) – Nylander
3. «A Scar» (3:45) – Johannessen
4. «Darts» (1:44) - Powell
5. «The Wall» (5:04) - Powell
6. «Used To Be Doublespeak» (5:47) - Powell
7. «The Katabatic Wind» (2:51) – Johannessen & Nylander
8. «Ahab's Pipe» (6:48) – Magic Pocket & Qvenild
9. «It's All Gone» (3:01) – Johannessen
10. «Dropmaker» (4:31) – Herskedal

- Recorded at Athletic Sound, Halden on April 24-25th 2010

== Personnel ==
- Hayden Powell - trumpet
- Erik Johannessen - trombone
- Daniel Herskedal - tuba
- Erik Nylander - drums

== Credits ==
- Executive producers – Håvard Stubø & Tord Rønning Krogtoft
- Mastered by – Bob Katz
- Mixed by – Kai Andersen & Magic Pocket
- Producer – Magic Pocket
- Recorded yy – Kai Andersen

== Notes ==
- Recorded at Athletic Sound, Halden on April 24-25th 2010
- Supported by Norwegian Academy of Music and the Norwegian «Fond For Utøvende Kunstnere»
