= 2002 in Norwegian music =

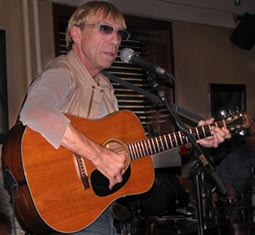
Jahn Teigen in 2002.

The following is a list of notable events and releases of the year 2002 in Norwegian music.

== Events ==
=== January ===
- 18 – The 21st annual Djangofestival started on Cosmopolite in Oslo, Norway (January 18 – 19).
- 25 – The 5th Polarjazz started in Longyearbyen, Svalbard (January 25 – 27).

=== February ===
- 1 – Kristiansund Opera Festival opened (February 1 – 16).

=== March ===
- 13 – The annual By:Larm started in Trondheim, Norway (March 13 – 16).
- 22 – The 29th Vossajazz started in Vossavangen, Norway (March 22 – 24).

=== April ===
- 30 – Ole Blues started in Bergen, Norway (April 30 – May 4).

=== May ===
- 5 – The 13th MaiJazz started in Stavanger, Norway (May 6 – 10).
- 24
  - The start of Bergen International Music Festival Festspillene i Bergen (May 24 – June 2).
  - The 30th Nattjazz started in Bergen, Norway (May 24 – June 1).

=== June ===
- 14 – Norwegian Wood started in Oslo, Norway (June 14 – 16).

=== July ===
- 3 – The 38th Kongsberg Jazzfestival started in Kongsberg, Norway (July 3 – 6).
- 15 – The 42nd Moldejazz started in Molde, Norway (July 15 – 20).

=== August ===
- 1 – The 15th Notodden Blues Festival started in Notodden (August 1 – 4).
- 5 – The 17th Oslo Jazzfestival started in Oslo, Norway (August 5 – 10).
- 7
  - The annual Øyafestivalen started in Oslo, Norway (August 7 – 10).
  - The 16th Sildajazz started in Haugesund, Norway (August 7 – 11).
- 21 – The 1st Insomnia Festival started in Tromsø (August 21 – 24).

=== September ===
- 20 – The Bergen International Chamber Music Festival started in Bergen, Norway (September 20 – 28.

=== Oktober ===
- 3 – Ultima Oslo Contemporary Music Festival started in Oslo, Norway (Oktober 3 – 13).
- 10 – The DølaJazz started in Lillehammer, Norway (Oktober 10 – 13).

=== November ===
- 1 – The Trondheim Jazz Festival started in Trondheim, Norway (November 1 – 3).
- 5 – Oslo World Music Festival started in Oslo, Norway (November 5 – 11).

=== December ===
- 11 – The Nobel Peace Prize Concert was held in Oslo Spektrum.

=== Unknown date ===
- Susanna Mälkki was in the autumn appointed as chief conductor for Stavanger Symphony Orchestra (2002–2005). The Finnish conductor was engaged for three years, and succeeded Ole Kristian Ruud(1999–2002).

== Albums released ==
=== May ===
Day	Album	Artist	Label	Notes	Ref.
13	Kyanos	Jon Balke & Magnetic North Orchestra	ECM Records	Produced by Jon Balke, Manfred Eicher	

=== November ===
Day	Album	Artist	Label	Notes	Ref.
4	Lux Aeterna	Terje Rypdal	ECM Records	Produced by Manfred Eicher	

=== Unknown date ===
I

Terje Isungset

- Iceman Is (Jazzland Recordings)

G

Frode Gjerstad

- Shadows And Light (FMR Records), with Terje Isungset

== Births ==
May

- 12 – Birgitta Elisa Oftestad, classical cellist.

== Deaths ==
February

- 1 – Sigurd Berge, composer (born 1929).

March

- 19 – Egil Storbekken, traditional folk musician flautist, and composer (born 1911).

May

- 6 – Bjørn Johansen, jazz saxophonist (born 1940).

June

- 18 – Stein Ove Berg, singer and songwriter (born 1948).

== See also ==
- 2002 in Norway
- Music of Norway
- Norway in the Eurovision Song Contest 2002
- 2002 in jazz
