= 1967 in Norwegian music =

The following is a list of notable events and releases of the year 1967 in Norwegian music.

== Events ==
=== April ===
- Kirsti Sparboe performs "Dukkemann" at the Eurovision Song Contest.

=== May ===
- The 15th Bergen International Festival started in Bergen, Norway.

=== June ===
- The 4th Kongsberg Jazz Festival started in Kongsberg, Norway.

=== July ===
- The 7th Moldejazz started in Molde, Norway.

== Albums released ==
=== Unknown date ===
G

Jan Garbarek Trio & Quartet

- Til Vigdis (Norsk Jazzforbund)

== Deaths ==
November

- 25 – Johannes Hanssen, bandmaster, composer and teacher.

== Births ==
February

- 1 – John Hegre, guitarist, songwriter and sound engineer.
- 3
  - Børge Petersen-Øverleir, jazz and rock guitarist.
  - Gisle Kverndokk, contemporary composer.
- 12 – Stein Inge Brækhus, jazz drummer and record producer
- 22 – Audun Erlien, jazz bassist, guitarist, and electronica performer.
- 26 – Audun Skorgen, jazz bassist.

March

- 9 – Siri Broch Johansen, Sami author and singer.
- 13 – Håkon Storm-Mathisen, jazz guitarist and composer.
- 31 – Ivar Kolve, jazz vibraphonist, percussionist, and composer.

April

- 1 – Dag Stokke, keyboardist in the band TNT, church organist and mastering engineer, cancer (died 2011).
- 8 – Margit Bakken, vocalist, guitarist, and songwriter.
- 14 – Frode Unneland, drummer and multi-instrumentalist.
- 24 – Magnus Grønneberg, vocalist (CC Cowboys).

May

- 18 – Svein Folkvord, jazz double bassist, sound engineer, and composer.

July

- 27 – Hans Mathisen, jazz guitarist and composer.

August

- 11 – Petter Wettre, jazz saxophonist and composer.

== See also ==
- 1967 in Norway
- Music of Norway
- Norway in the Eurovision Song Contest 1967
