= Kirsti Huke =

Norwegian singer, and composer (born 1977)

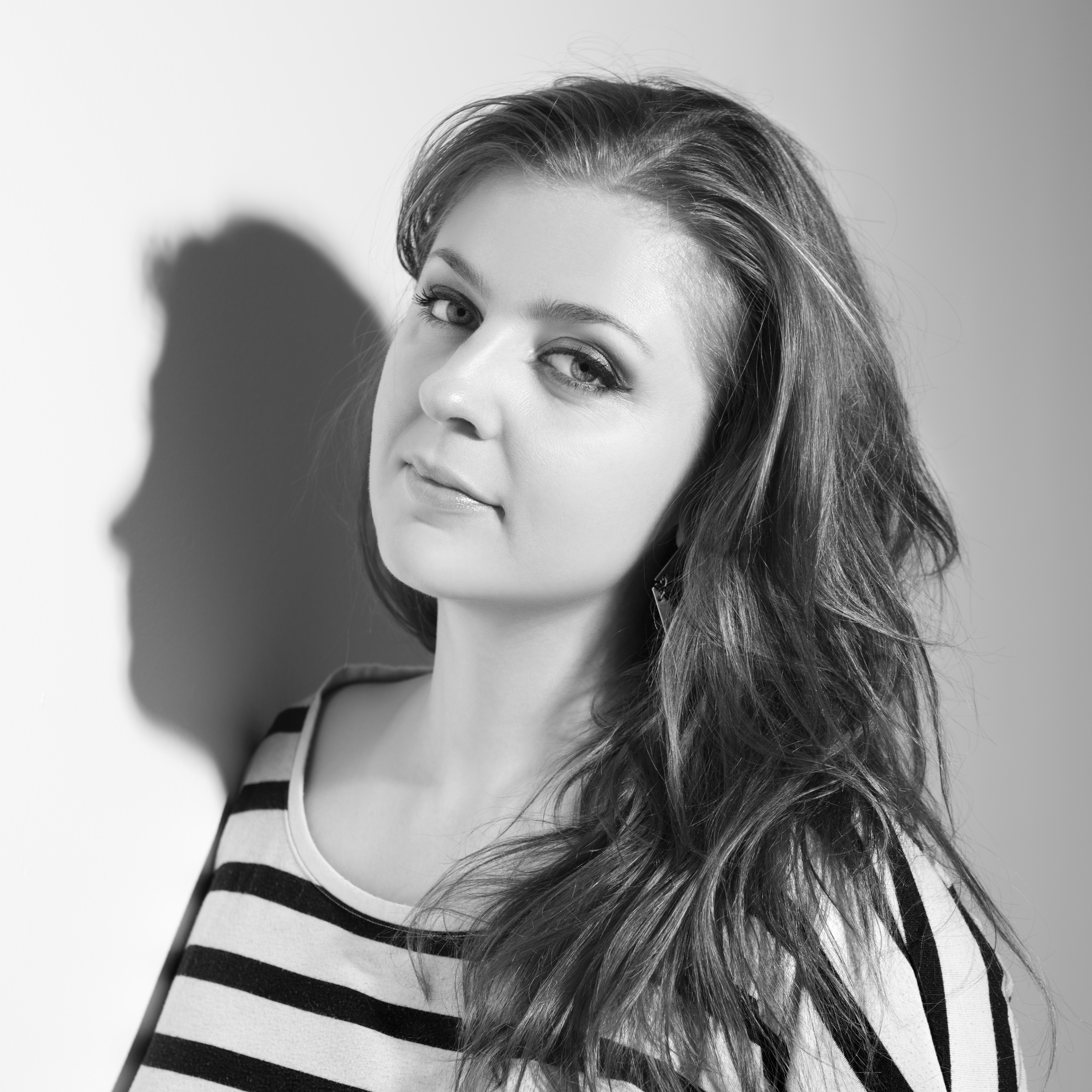
- photo: Therese Lee Jansen

Background information
- Born: Kirsti Huke; 6 March 1977 (age 49); Melhus Municipality, Sør-Trøndelag
- Genres: Jazz, experimental
- Occupation: Singer-songwriter
- Instrument: Vocals
- Years active: 1998 to present
- Website: www.kirstihuke.com/deloo.html

Kirsti Huke (born 6 March 1977, in Melhus Municipality, Norway) is a Norwegian singer and composer. Huke was best recognized as the lead singer for Norwegian doom metal/experimental band The 3rd and the Mortal in the final line-up.

She is also known from collaborations with musicians such as Egil Kapstad, Erlend Skomsvoll, Tore Brunborg, Ola Kvernberg, Vigleik Storaas, Håvard Wiik, Håkon Mjåset Johansen, Erik Nylander and Steinar Raknes.

She is the younger sister of the author Marte Huke.

== Career ==
Huke was educated at the Heimdal Upper Secondary School from 1993 to 1996, and pursued the Jazz program at Norwegian University of Science and Technology from 1996 to 2001. She was employed there as an assistant professor in 2016. Her own Kirsti Huke Quartet (established in 1998) also included Håvard Wiik (piano), Håkon Mjåset Johansen (drums) and Steinar Raknes (bass). In 2002, Wiik and Johansen were replaced by Vigleik Storaas (piano) and Erik Nylander (drums).

The K.H. Quartet has performed at jazz festivals such as Nattjazz in 2006. They released the album Deloo in 2007, followed by Kirsti Huke in 2009. She has also been associated with the Trondheim Symphony Orchestra and Egil Kapstad Quartet at the Trondheim Jazz Festival in 2001, which was arranged by Erlend Skomsvoll and featured Håkon Mjåset Johansen on the double bass.

In 2006 Huke started as the lead singer of the indie pop rock band -phy (initiated in 1997) along with guitarist Petter Vågan, drummer Vigdis Sjelmo and bassist Ellen Ersfjord. The band launched the album Tree House in 2011.

Huke has toured with Trondheim Voices, and contributed to the Grand Telemark with Wetle Holte and Espen Gundersen, The 3rd and the Mortal, Tom Steinar Lund, and Per Borten's band Moving Oos with Siri Gjære. The last band released the album Peace & Love in 2007.

== Discography ==
As band leader

- 2007: Deloo (Grappa Music)
- 2009: Kirsti Huke (Fairplay Records)
- 2015: Rags & Silks (Name Music & Publishing), with Ola Kvernberg and Erik Nylander

=== Collaborations ===
- 2001: Love Seriously Damages Health (Bergland Prod.), with Siri Gjære
- 2002: Memoirs (Voices Music & Entertainment), with The 3rd and the Mortal
- 2006: Survival Kit (Bergland Prod.), with Siri Gjære
- 2007: Peace & Love (Kong Tiki/Playground Records), with Moving Oos
- 2008: Grand Telemark (Sonne Disk), with Grand Telemark
- 2009: The Wonder (Sonne Disk), with Grand Telemark
- 2010: Improvoicing (MNJ Records), with Trondheim Voices
- 2011: Scent Of Soil (Hubro), with Tore Brunborg, Petter Vågan, Rune Nergaard & Gard Nilssen
- 2011: Tree House (Crispin Glover Records), with -phy
- 2013: Vi Vil Ut På Byen! (Øra Fonogram), with Tullkattesnutene

=== Other appearances ===
- 2007: Ingen Andre (MBN Records), with Ulf Risnes
- 2007: City of Glass (Voices Of Wonder Records), with The Soundbyte/Paul Irgens
- 2008: Katalysator (EMI Records), with Åge Aleksandersen
- 2008: Sinecure (Crispin Glover Records), with Bitch Cassidy
- 2009: New Violators (Fairplay Entertainment), with New Violators
- 2009: Åge-boks 2 (Odeon Records), with Åge Aleksandersen
- 2009: The Roaring Silence (Sandforest Records), with V Before U
- 2010: Doppelgängers (Aftermath Music), with Goat The Head
- 2010: While We Wait (The Record), with The Project
- 2011: Migrations (MNJ records), with Trondheim Jazz Orchestra & Øyvind Brække
- 2011: Scent Of Soil (List of Hubro albums|Hubro Music), with Scent Of Soil
- 2012: Small Town (Columbia, Sony Music Norway), with Hans Bollandsås
- 2012: Hurricane (Sonne Disk), with Wetle Holte
- 2013: Sidewalk Comedy (MNJ records), with Trondheim Jazz Orchestra & Eirik Hegdal
- 2014: Yesterday Song (MusikkLosen), with Terje Bjørklund
- 2014: Vokal (NorCD), with Elin Rosseland
- 2015: Texum (2015), with Texum

Awards
Preceded by Susanna Wallumrød	Recipient of the Radka Toneff Memorial Award; 2017	Succeeded by -
