= Skjelbred =

Skjelbred is a Norwegian surname. Notable people with the surname include:

- Bjørn Bolstad Skjelbred (born 1970), Norwegian composer, arranger, improviser, and teacher
- Per Ciljan Skjelbred (born 1987), Norwegian footballer
