= Hotel Interludes =

Studio album / Live album by Eyolf Dale
- Released: 2011
- Recorded: Store Studio NRK, February 1st, 2011; Live in concert at Levinsalen, Norwegian Academy of Music (NMH), April 27th, 2011
- Genre: Contemporary jazz
- Length: 50:56
- Label: Curling Legs
- Producer: Eyolf Dale

Eyolf Dale chronology
Hotel Interludes (2011)	Hometown Interludes (2013)

Hotel Interludes (released 2011 in Oslo, Norway by Curling Legs – CLP CD 122) is the debut solo piano album by the pianist Eyolf Dale.

== Critical reception ==
Professional ratings
Review scores
Source	Rating
Dagbladet	5/6 stars
NettAvisen	5/6 stars

The review by Terje Mosnes of the Norwegian newspaper Dagbladet awarded the album 5 stars (dice), and the reviewer Tor Hammerø of the Norwegian newspaper NettAvisen awarded the album 5 stars (dice)

Dale shows instrumentalist and composer skills, to an exceptional extent. He was recognized in Norway already in 2008 when he and saxophonist André Roligheten won Jazzintro award within the duo Albatrosh. Since then he has taken new steps as a performer, composer and producer, until he now presents his own expression in album format. From the first note he makes it clear that he has a sense of rich, singing piano tone and he does sound treatment seriously. This musical expression is more than mature for world jazz scene.

== Track listing ==
All compositions by Eyolf Dale

1. «Shades Of History» (7:18)
2. «Hotel Interlude» (1:31)
3. «Prolleprepp» (4:52)
4. «Grand (Hotel)» (5:40)
5. «Shades Of What» (6:07)
6. «Bewarmth» (6:34)
7. «Pralleperp» (6:19)
8. «Cloud Nine» (7:17)
9. «Homage To Trains Itself» (5:18)

- Recorded in Recorded at Store Studio NRK, February 1st, 2011 & tracks 3, 7 & 8 recorded live in concert at Levinsalen, Norw. State Academy of Music (NMH), April 27th, 2011

== Personnel ==
- Eyolf Dale - piano

== Notes ==
- Recorded at Store Studio NRK, February 1, 2011
- Tracks 3, 7 & 8 recorded live in concert at Levinsalen, Norw. State Academy of Music (NMH), April 27, 2011
