= Audun Skorgen =

Norwegian jazz musician (born 1967)

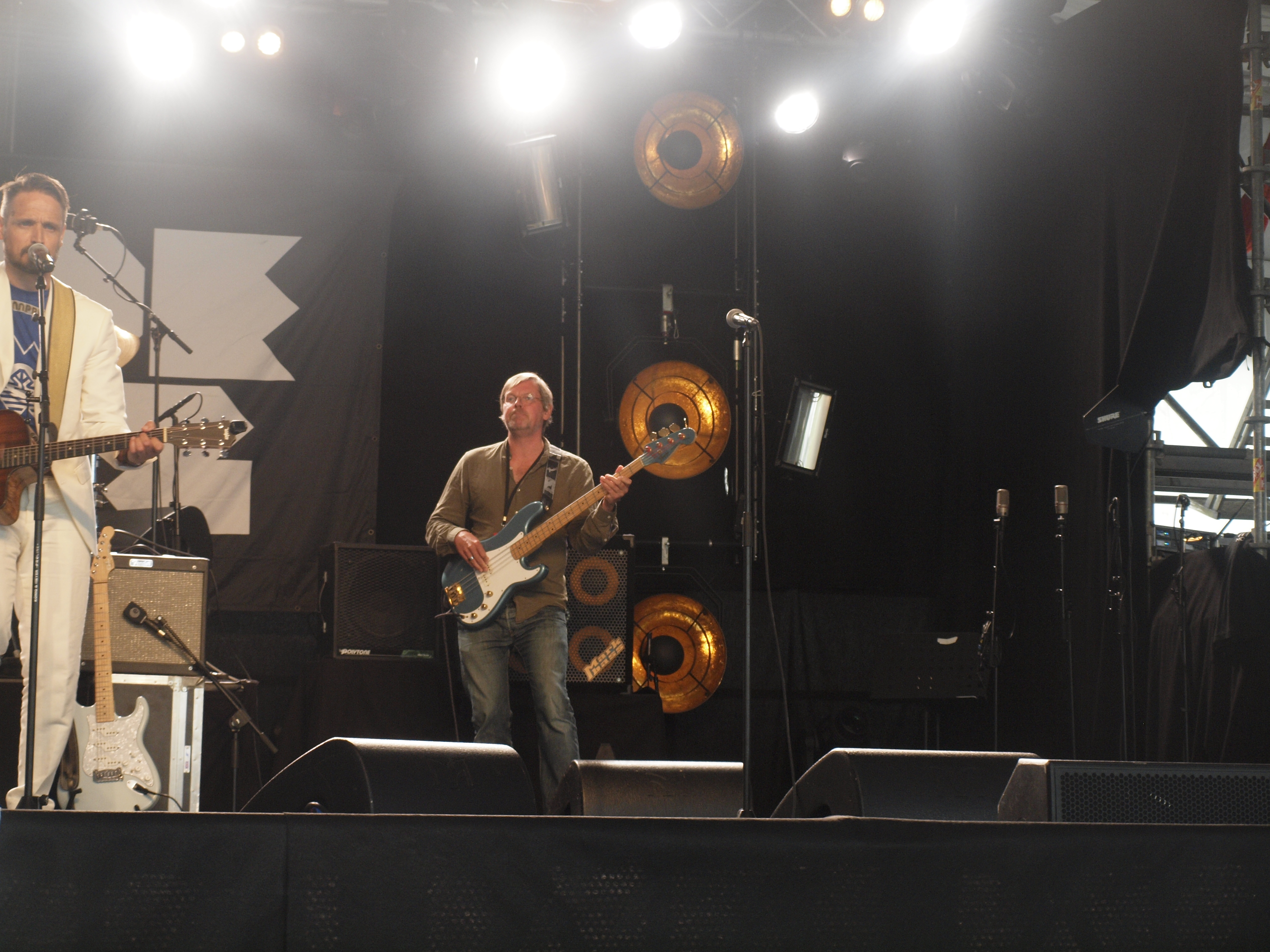
- Audun Skorgen at Moldejazz 2019

Background information
- Born: 26 February 1967 (age 59); Ålesund, Møre og Romsdal
- Origin: Norway
- Genres: Jazz
- Occupations: Musician, composer
- Instruments: Upright bass, bass guitar, guitar
- Label: Magica Records
- Website: www.moremusikarane.no/Moeremusikarane/Moeremusikarane/A.-Skorgen

Audun Skorgen (born 25 February 1967) is a Norwegian jazz musician (upright bass and bass guitar).

== Career ==
Skorgen is a graduate of the Jazz program at Trondheim Musikkonsevatorium (2000). He specialized in improvisation, and has a distinctive bottling bass technique. In addition to being an active freelance musician, he has also been a county musician, first in Finnmark and later in Sunndal, Møre og Romsdal, from 2008 as part of "Møremusikarane".

Skorgen has also collaborated within the bands like 'Velvet Lounge Orchestra', including Marita Røstad (vocals and rhodes), Stian Omenås (trumpet), Håvard Stubø (guitar) and Erik Nylander (drums), and 'Frode Grønmyr Quintet' including Grønmyr (gitar), Peter Wergeni (saxophones), Norvall Dahl (piano) and Simon Kongshaug (drums).

== Discography ==
With Marita Røstad

- 2007: Silent Sunday (Magica Records)
