= 1970 in Norwegian music =

The following is a list of notable events and releases of the year 1970 in Norwegian music.

== Events ==
=== May ===
- 13 – The 18th Bergen International Festival started in Bergen, Norway (May 13 – 27).

=== June ===
- The 7th Kongsberg Jazz Festival started in Kongsberg, Norway.

=== July ===
- The 11th Moldejazz started in Molde, Norway.

== Albums released ==
=== Unknown date ===
F

Svein Finnerud Trio

- Plastic Sun (Sonet Records)

G

Jan Garbarek Quartet

- Afric Pepperbird (ECM Records)

Rowland Greenberg & His Group

- Swing Is The Thing! (Music For Pleasure)

K

Karin Krog

- Some Other Spring, Blues And Ballads (Sonet Records), with Dexter Gordon

N

Bjarne Nerem

- How Long Has This Been Going On (Polydor Records)

R

Terje Rypdal

- Min Bul (Polydor Records), with Bjørnar Andresen and Espen Rud

== Deaths ==
August

- 15 – Karl Andersen (66), cellist and composer.

== Births ==
January

- 16 – Liv Marit Wedvik, country singer (died 2015).
- 26 – Eskil Brøndbo, drummer, D.D.E.

February

- 9 – Eldbjørg Raknes, jazz vocalist and composer.
- 13 – Karoline Krüger, singer, songwriter, and pianist.

March

- 19 – Harald Johnsen, jazz double bassist (died 2011).
- 22 – Live Maria Roggen, jazz singer, songwriter and composer.

April

- 1 – Tone Lise Moberg, jazz vocalist.
- 7 – Leif Ove Andsnes, classical pianist and chamber musician.
- 25 – Kjersti Stubø, jazz vocalist.

May

- 19 – Vidar Busk, guitarist, vocalist, composer and record producer.

June

- 7 – Even "Magnet" Johansen, singer and songwriter.
- 19 – Øyvor Volle, violinist.

July

- 6 – Harald Nævdal, guitarist and text writer, Immortal.
- 14 – Jacob Young, jazz guitarist, music arranger, composer, and band leader.
- 16 – Jørn Skogheim, guitarist, clarinetist, composer, record producer, music arranger, and music teacher.
- 24 – Anja Garbarek, singer and songwriter.

August

- 21 – Simone Eriksrud, jazz singer and composer.

October

- 5 – Tord Gustavsen, jazz pianist and composer.
- 6 – Maria Kannegaard, jazz pianist.
- 17 – Heine Totland, singer.
- 20 – Håvard Lund, jazz saxophonist and composer.

Unknown date

- Bjørn Bolstad Skjelbred, composer, music arranger, improviser, and music teacher.

== See also ==
- 1970 in Norway
- Music of Norway
