= Espen Berg (musician) =

Norwegian pianist, arranger and composer

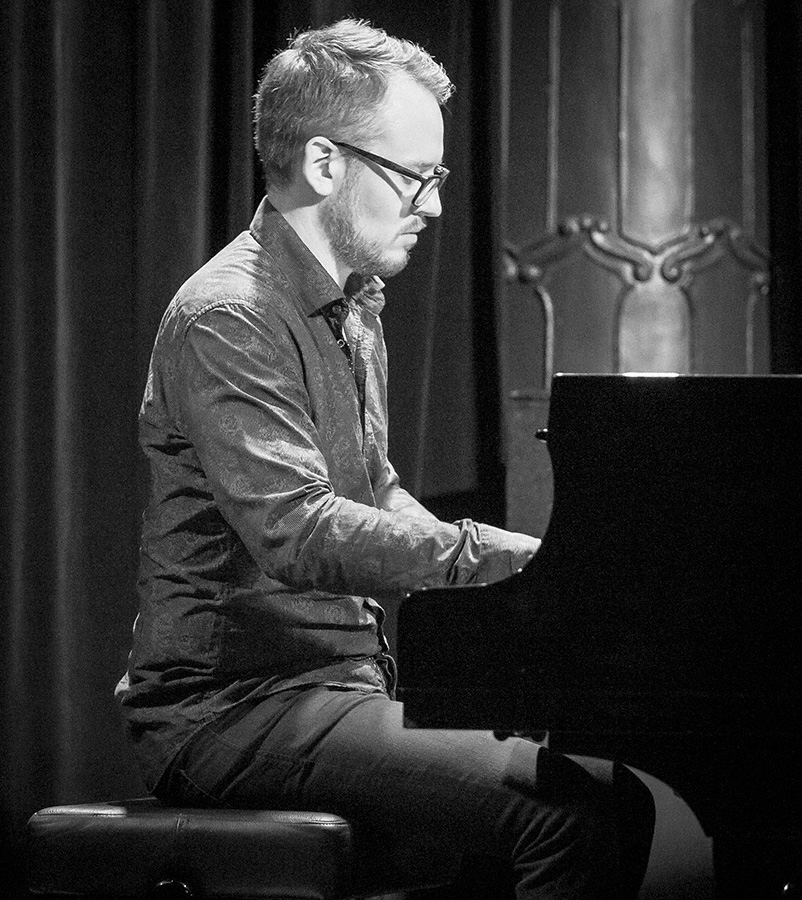
- Espen Berg at Victoria teater in Oslo in 2016

Background information
- Born: 30 June 1983 (age 42); Hamar, Hedmark, Norway
- Genres: Jazz; classical; improvised music
- Occupations: Musician; arranger; composer
- Instrument: Piano
- Label: Atterklang
- Member of: Listen!; Trondheim Jazz Orchestra
- Website: Official website

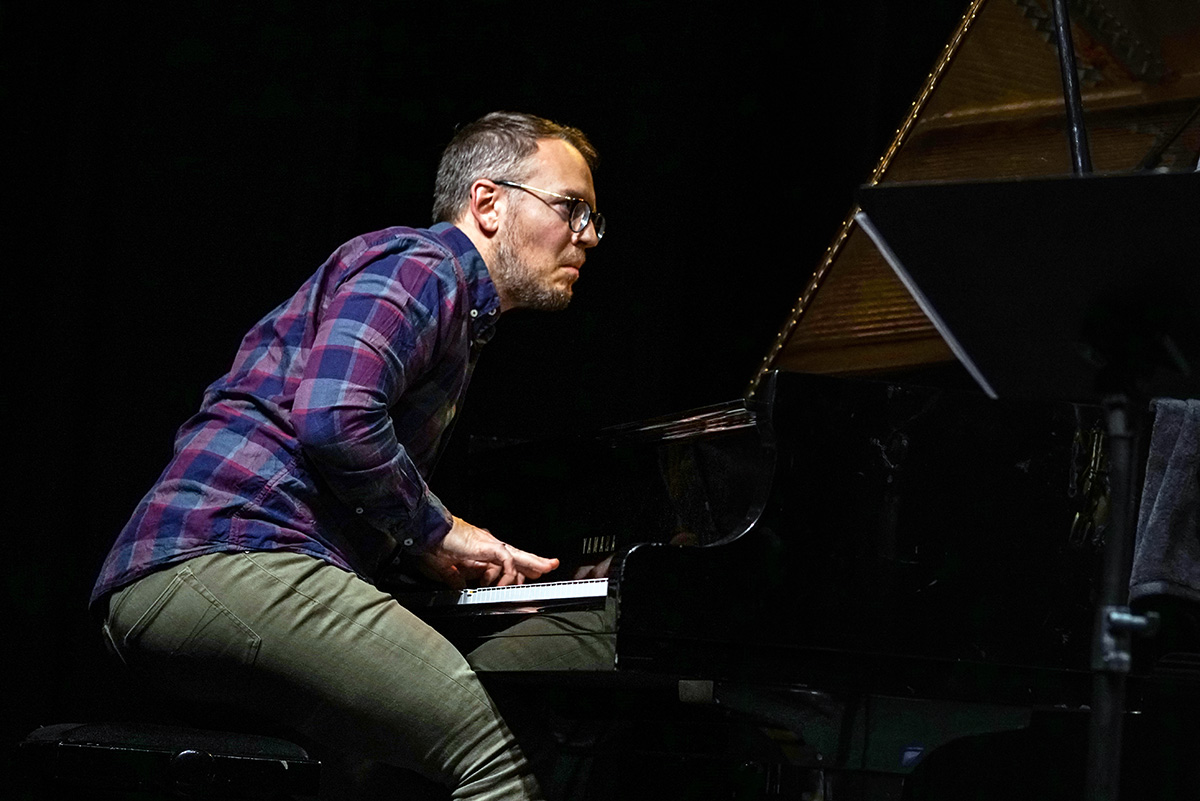
Espen Berg with Bridges band, 2019 Aarhus (Denmark) Photo Hreinn Gudlaugsson

Espen Berg (born 30 June 1983) is a Norwegian jazz musician, arranger and composer from Trondheim, known for his collaborations with musicians such as trumpeter Per Jørgensen, saxophonist Marius Neset and the Trondheim Jazz Orchestra.

== Career ==
Berg was born in Hamar, and began playing the piano at a very early age; at only 7 years old he was featured on national TV, performing his own compositions. He began studying the jazz tradition at the age of 16, and he earned his Master's degree in Performing music from the acknowledged Jazz program at Norwegian University of Science and Technology (NTNU) in 2008. At the time he started the trio Listen!, together with Bendik Giske (saxophone) and Daniel Herskedal (tuba).

Berg started working as a professional musician in 2003, and toured with his own trio Listen in Scandinavia, Spain, Syria, Cuba, Belgium, France and Hungary. He has released three albums with his own bands, and also plays within the jazz band Green Serene, Kåre Kolve Quartet and Trondheim Jazz Orchestra, and together with the saxophonist Marius Neset performing the Commissioned work at Moldejazz in 2012. In 2007 he won the prize for best soloist at Hoeilaart Int'l Jazz Competition in Belgium, and in the summer of 2013 Berg was one of eight semi-finalists in the Solo Piano Competition at the Montreux Jazz Festival. His first solo piano album, Noctilucent (2012), was named one of the ten best releases of 2012 by All About Jazz, and was planning for a second solo album in November 2013.

Berg has also written music for the Spellemannprisen-nominated Trondheim Soloists, Cikada String Quartet, Quintus and Seeb.

He is an assistant professor at the Department of Music, NTNU (Music technology and Music performance) and in the period 2005–2015 he was a lecturer at Trøndertun folkehøgskole.

== Honors ==
- 2007: Best soloist, at Hoeilaart Int'l Jazz Competition in Belgium
- 2016: Espen Berg Trio was appointed NTNU-ambassadør (=NTNU Ambassador) during Trondheim Jazz Festival. The trio consists of Berg: piano; Bárður Reinert Poulsen: bass; Simon Olderskog Albertsen: drums.

== Discography ==
=== As leader/co-leader ===
Year recorded	Title	Label	Personnel/Notes
2007?	Listen!	Schmell	With Listen; trio, with Bendik Giske (sax), Daniel Herskedal (tuba)
2009?	II	Schmell	With Listen
2012?	Noctilucent	Atterklang	Solo piano
2013	Acres of Blue	Atterklang	Solo piano
2015?	Mønster	Atterklang	Trio
2016?	Bridges	AMP	As Bridges; quintet, with Seamus Blake (sax), Hayden Powell (trumpet), Jesper Bodilsen (bass), Anders Thorén (drums)
2017?	Bølge	Blue Gleam	Trio; with Bárður Reinert Poulsen (bass), Simon Olderskog Albertsen (drums)
2017	Bridges – Live in Norway	AMP	As Bridges; quintet, with Seamus Blake (sax), Hayden Powell (trumpet), Jesper Bodilsen (bass), Anders Thorén (drums); in concert
