= Daniel Herskedal =

Norwegian musician

- Daniel Herskedal performing at Løa Jølstraholmen, Jølster 2026; Photo: Tore Sætre

Background information
- Born: 2 April 1982 (age 44); Molde, Møre og Romsdal, Norway
- Genre: Jazz
- Occupations: Musician, composer
- Instruments: Tuba, Bass trumpet
- Label: Edition
- Website: danielherskedal.com

Daniel Herskedal (born 2 April 1982) is a Norwegian jazz tubist. He is regarded as one of the most talented jazz tubists in Norway.

== Career ==
Herskedal started playing the French horn as a boy, then later took up the tuba. He started formal studies at the Storyville jazz club and attended the music program at Molde videregående skole. He recorded albums with his hometown band, Dixi, before moving to Trondheim. He got his bachelor's degree in jazz at Trondheim Musikkonsevatorium (2002–06), where he started the trio Listen! with Espen Berg (piano) and Bendik Giske (saxophone). In 2008, he earned a master's degree in jazz tuba at the Rhythmic Music Conservatory in Copenhagen. His thesis was on joik and jazz, in addition to preparing the orchestral work A Sacred Narrative, which was performed in Kong Haakon Kirke, the Norwegian Seamen's Church in Copenhagen (2007). During his studies he joined the Trondheim Jazz Orchestra on several occasions, and in Copenhagen he played in the student orchestra stoRMChaser with Django Bates. He has also worked as a county musician in Nord-Trøndelag.

Herskedal plays in several bands, such as City Stories, Listen, including Bendik Giske (saxophone) and Espen Berg piano (established in 2002), Magic Pocket, Trondheim Jazz Orchestra, and Jens Carelius. In the trio Kaktusch he plays with Anton Eger (drums) and Marius Neset (saxophone). In Quintus Big Band (established in 2007) he collaborated with Bendik Giske (saxophone), Kristoffer Lo (tuba), Ingrid Bergene Fosaa (horn), Morten Schrøder and Bjørn Erik Heggli (trumpet), Frode Fjellheim and Stian Lundberg (percussion), and Elisabeth Fossan (trombone). The quartet Bat Band includes Hayden Powell (trumpet), Steinar Nickelsen (organ) and Lasse Ehn (drums). With Stefan Ringive (trombone) and Anders Bast (saxophone) and Lasse Ehn (drums), he performs in the quartet BrassBoost. With Hayden Powell (trumpet), Erik Johannessen (trombone) and Erik Nylander (drums) he formed the quartet Magic Pocket that appeared at Nattjazz and Moldejazz (2004). He wrote music for the short film The End (2008) by Bendik Kaltenborn.

== Awards and honors ==
- 2004: The Jury's soloist award at the Getxco international jazz competition
- 2004: The Jury's first prize, with Listen, at the Hoeillart international jazz contest
- 2008: JazzTalent Award at Moldejazz
- 2009: Jazztipendiat of the Year, with Magic Pocket, at Moldejazz

== Discography ==
=== Solo albums ===
- 2010: City Stories (NorCD)
- 2013: Dagane (NorCD)
- 2015: Slow Eastbound Train (Edition Records)
- 2017: The Roc (Edition Records)
- 2019: Voyage (Edition Records)
- 2020: Call for Winter (Edition Records)
- 2022: Out of the Fog (Edition Records)
- 2024: Call for Winter II: Resonance (Edition Records)
- 2025: Movements of Air (Edition Records)

=== Collaborations ===
With the trio Listen

- 2007: Listen! (Schmell)
- 2009: II (Schmell)

With the trio Lochs/Balthaus/Herskedal

- 2009: Lochs/Balthaus/Herskedal (Music Under Construction)
- 2012: Choices (Berthold)

With Magic Pocket & Morten Qvenild

- 2011: The Katabatic Wind (Bolage)

With Marius Neset

- 2012: Neck of the Woods (Edition), with Svanholm Singers
- 2014: Lion (ACT Music)

With Mattia Vlad Morleo

- 2022: Øyne feat. Daniel Herskedal
- 2024: Echoes of Solitude
