= 1948 in Norwegian music =

The following is a list of notable events and releases of the year 1948 in Norwegian music.

== Events ==
- Egil Monn-Iversen initiated the song group "The Monn Keys" (1948–1964).

== Births ==
January

- 29 – Espen Rud, jazz drummer, composer, and music arranger.

March

- 1 – Konrad Kaspersen, jazz upright bassist.
- 1 – Hans Rotmo, singer and songwriter, Vømmøl Spellmannslag.
- 19 – Henning Gravrok, jazz saxophonist and music teacher.
- 24 – Frode Gjerstad, jazz saxophonist.
- 26 – Kåre Jostein Simonsen, bandoneonist.

May

- 1 – Carl Morten Iversen, jazz upright bassist (died 2023).

June

- 17 – Hege Tunaal, folk singer.

October

- 4 – Steinar Ofsdal, flautist and composer.
- 22 – Håkon Austbø, classical pianist.
- 29 – Audun Tylden, record producer (died 2011)
- 31 – Knut Buen, fiddler, composer, folklorist, and publisher.

November

- 22 – Jens Harald Bratlie, pianist.

December

- 22 – Stein Ove Berg, singer and songwriter (died 2002).

== See also ==
- 1948 in Norway
- Music of Norway
