= Marita Røstad =

Norwegian singer-songwriter (born 1978)

- Born: 5 November 1978 (age 47); Gjøvik, Oppland
- Origin: Norway
- Genres: Jazz
- Occupations: Musician, composer
- Instruments: Vocals, piano
- Website: maritarostad.com

Marita Røstad (born 5 November 1978 in Gjøvik, Norway) is a Norwegian singer-songwriter and jazz vocalist from Aust-Torpa, known as a band leader and for her well-received solo album.

== Career ==
Røstad studied vocals in the jazz program at Trondheim Musikkonsevatorium (2000–04), where she started her own band including fellow students. She graduated in 2004 and combined her musical career with working as a song-teacher at Trondheim music school, before moving to Oslo where she started her own record label entitled "Magica Records", releasing her debut album Silent Sunday in 2007, including Stian Omenås (trumpet), Håvard Stubø (guitar), Gard Nilssen (drums) and Rune Nergaard (bass).

In 2005 she performed at the international Nattjazz festival in Bergen, Norway, as Marita Røstad & Velvet City, after touring Spain the same year. She plays the electric piano in addition to vocals within the band "Velvet City", which includes Stian Omenås, Håvard Stubø, Audun Skorgen (bass) and Erik Nylander (drums). In 2010, Røstad and Stian Leknes (vocals) from Earth Died Screaming gave a rare duo concert at the Trondheim Jazz Festival. The band Earth Died Screaming is a tribute band to Tom Waits and includes in addition to Røstad and Leknes, Kurt Sprenger (guitar), Magnus Mortensen (double bass), Peder Simonsen (tuba), Daniel Elide (drums) and Alessandro Elide (percussion).

== Discography ==
=== Solo album ===
- 2007: Silent Sunday (Magica Records)
