= Eyolf Dale =

Norwegian jazz pianist and composer

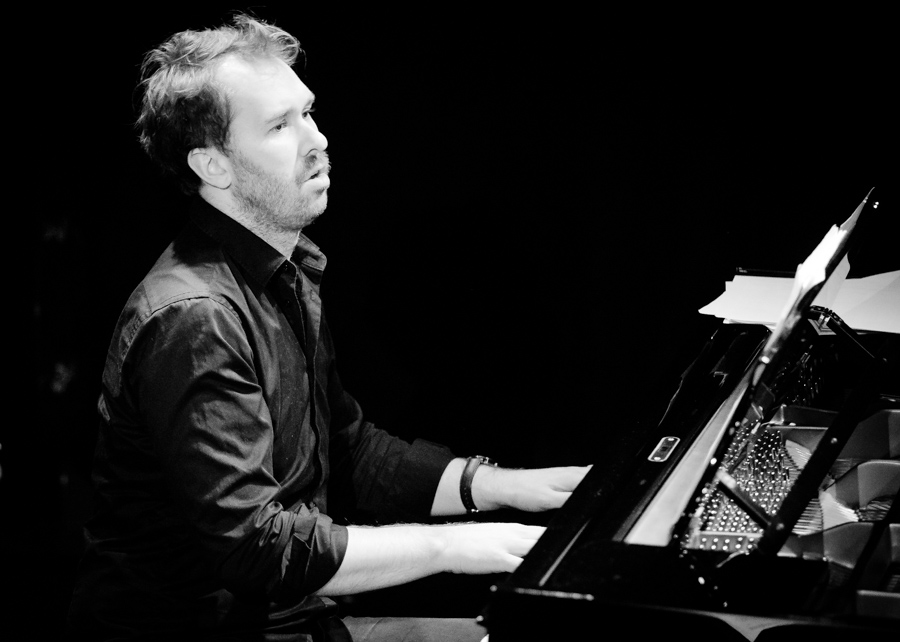
- Eyolf Dale performing in 2017

Background information
- Born: 5 March 1985 (age 41); Skien, Telemark, Norway
- Genres: Jazz
- Occupations: Musician, composer
- Instrument: Piano
- Labels: Rune Grammofon; Curling Legs; Edition
- Website: Official website

Eyolf Dale (born 5 March 1985) is a Norwegian jazz pianist and composer.

== Career ==
Dale has established himself as one of Norway's leading jazz pianists, with numerous record releases and extensive international touring. Both as a sideman and a solo performer, he has performed all over Europe, as well as on tours in the United States, Japan and China.

Dale is known from both his solo work and collaborations with a great number of jazz artists, including Eyolf Dale's Wolf Valley octet, Albatrosh, Daniel Herskedal, Hayden Powell Trio, and Trondheim Jazz Orchestra. With the duo Albatrosh, alongside reedsman André Roligheten, he was awarded "Young Jazz Musicians of the Year 2008" in the JazzIntro competition, and the duo was also awarded "Best Band" at the European Jazz Competition in 2010 at the North Sea Jazz Festival in Rotterdam. He was nominated for Spellemannprisen — the Norwegian equivalent of the Grammy Award — both in 2013 and 2016 for his solo albums.

In recent years, the Eyolf Dale Trio — featuring bassist Per Zanussi and drummer Audun Kleive — has become the central vehicle for his work. The trio's debut album, Being, was released in 2021, followed by The Wayfarers on 27 January 2023. The Wayfarers was recorded at Oslo Concert Hall and is noted for its blend of Norwegian folk, jazz and classical music, including the use of a Hammerspinet. The album received five-star reviews from Aftenposten and received coverage in Jazziz magazine. On The Wayfarers, Zanussi and Kleive were involved in the compositional process at an earlier stage than on previous recordings, reflecting the trio's growing collaborative dynamic.

In October 2024, Dale released The Space Between Two Notes, his seventh album on Edition Records, which reimagines compositions from Being and The Wayfarers with orchestral arrangements by the Norwegian Radio Orchestra, conducted by Miho Hazama. The trio's most recent album, When Shadows Dance, was released in February 2025, recorded at Oslo Concert Hall in June 2024.

Dale has also worked in orchestral formats, composing his first piano concerto, Echoes in Oslo, performed with the Telemark Chamber Orchestra at Oslo Concert Hall and released in 2023.

In addition to his performing career, Dale serves as an associate professor in jazz at the Norwegian Academy of Music.

== Awards and honors ==
- 2008: "Årets unge jazzmusikere" within Albatrosh, by Rikskonsertene and the Norwegian Jazz Federation
- 2008: Finalist in "Young Nordic Jazz Comets" within Albatrosh, held in Copenhagen, Denmark
- 2008: Skien municipal Encouragement price awarded Albatrosh
- 2009: "Beste band" within Albatrosh, in the European Jazz Competition during the North Sea Jazz Festival.
- 2009: 1st prize in the European competition Nomme Jazz for pianists
- 2012: JazZtipendiat granted Albatrosh during the Moldejazz
- 2014: Nominated for Spellemannprisen in the category of Jazz
- 2016: Nominated for Spellemannprisen in the category of Jazz

== Discography ==
=== As leader/co-leader ===
Year recorded	Title	Label	Notes
2009	Seagull Island	Inner Ear	with André Roligheten (tenor saxophone)
2010	Mystery Orchestra with Grenager & Tafjord	Inner Ear	with André Roligheten (tenor saxophone and bass clarinet), Hild Sofie Tafjord (French horn), Lene Grenager (cello)
2011	Yonkers	Rune Grammofon	with André Roligheten (tenor saxophone)
2011	Hotel Interludes	Curling Legs	Solo piano
2013	Hometown Interludes	Curling Legs	Solo piano
2014	Tree House	MNJ	with André Roligheten, Trondheim Jazz Orchestra
2014	Night Owl	Rune Grammofon	with André Roligheten (tenor saxophone and bass clarinet)
2016	Wolf Valley	Edition	With André Roligheten (tenor sax, clarinet), Hayden Powell (trumpet), Kristoffer Kompen (trombone), Rob Waring (vibraphone), Adrian Løseth Waade (violin), Per Zanussi (bass, saw), Gard Nilssen (drums)
2018	Return to Mind	Edition	With Per Zanussi (bass), Gard Nilssen (drums), Andre Roligheten (sax, clarinet), Hayden Powell (trumpet), Kristoffer Kompen (trombone), Rob Waring (vibraphone), Adrian Løseth Waade (violin)
2019	Departure	Edition	With André Roligheten (tenor saxophone and clarinet)
2020	Being	Edition	With Per Zanussi (double bass), Audun Kleive (drums)
2021	A patch of old snow EP	Edition	Solo piano
2023	The Wayfarers	Edition	With Per Zanussi (bass, saw), Audun Kleive (drums)
2023	Echoes of Oslo – Piano Concerto	Edition	With Telemark Chamber Orchestra
2024	The Space Between Two Notes	Edition	With Norwegian Radio Orchestra, Miho Hazama (conductor), Audun Kleive (drums), Per Zanussi (bass)
2025	When Shadows Dance	Edition	With Audun Kleive (drums), Per Zanussi (bass)

=== Collaborative works ===
- 2002: Vår (Plus Records), within Per-Kristian Ekholt Powerband 12+
- 2009: Gjenfortellinger (Grappa Music), with Pitsj
- 2009: Neo Dada (Rune Grammofon), with Jono El Grande
- 2009: Live at Dokkhuset (MNJ Records), with Midtnorsk Ungdomsstorband
- 2011: Stillness (Losen Records), with Hildegunn Øiseth
- 2011: The Attic (Inner Ear), within Hayden Powell Trio
- 2011: Short Stories of Happiness (Schmell), with Kristoffer Kompen
- 2013: Roots and Stems (Periskop Records), with Hayden Powell
- 2013: 2.0 (Hot Club Records), with Jazzbanditt
- 2013: Krumkakesanger (Bragvin Fonogram), with Åselill Sæthre
- 2014: Agdergata 1 (Kompis Records), with Kristoffer Kompen
- 2015: Slow Eastbound Train (Edition Records), with Daniel Herskedal
- 2015: Circadian Rhythm and Blues (Periskop Records), with Hayden Powell
- 2017: The Roc (Edition Records), with Daniel Herskedal
- 2017: Sanger for katten (Ponca Jazz Records), with Åselill Sæthre
- 2017: Sundown (Kompis Records), with Kristoffer Kompen
- 2018: Six Commissions (Periskop Records), with Hayden Powell
- 2018: Commuter Report (Losen Records), with Scheen Jazzorkester
- 2019: Voyage (Edition Records), with Daniel Herskedal, Helge Andreas Norbakken, Bergmund Skaslien, Maher Mahmoud
- 2020: The Moon Doesn't Drink (Jazzland), with Lyder Røed
- 2021: Harbour (Edition Records), with Daniel Herskedal
- 2021: Engangsdager (Grappa), with Daniela Reyes
- 2022: Unurban (Klokkereint), with Traktor
- 2022: Luna (IJV), with Ingrid Jasmin
- 2022: En egen ro (Lise Hvoslef), with Lise Hvoslef
- 2023: The Realization (ARC Recordings), with John Børge Askeland, Arve Henriksen, Helge Andreas Norbakken
- 2024: Pax (2L), with Ensemble96, Current saxophone quartet
- 2025: Movements of Air (Edition Records), with Daniel Herskedal, Helge Andreas Norbakken
