= Stian Omenås =

Norwegian jazz trumpeter, conductor and composer (born 1980)

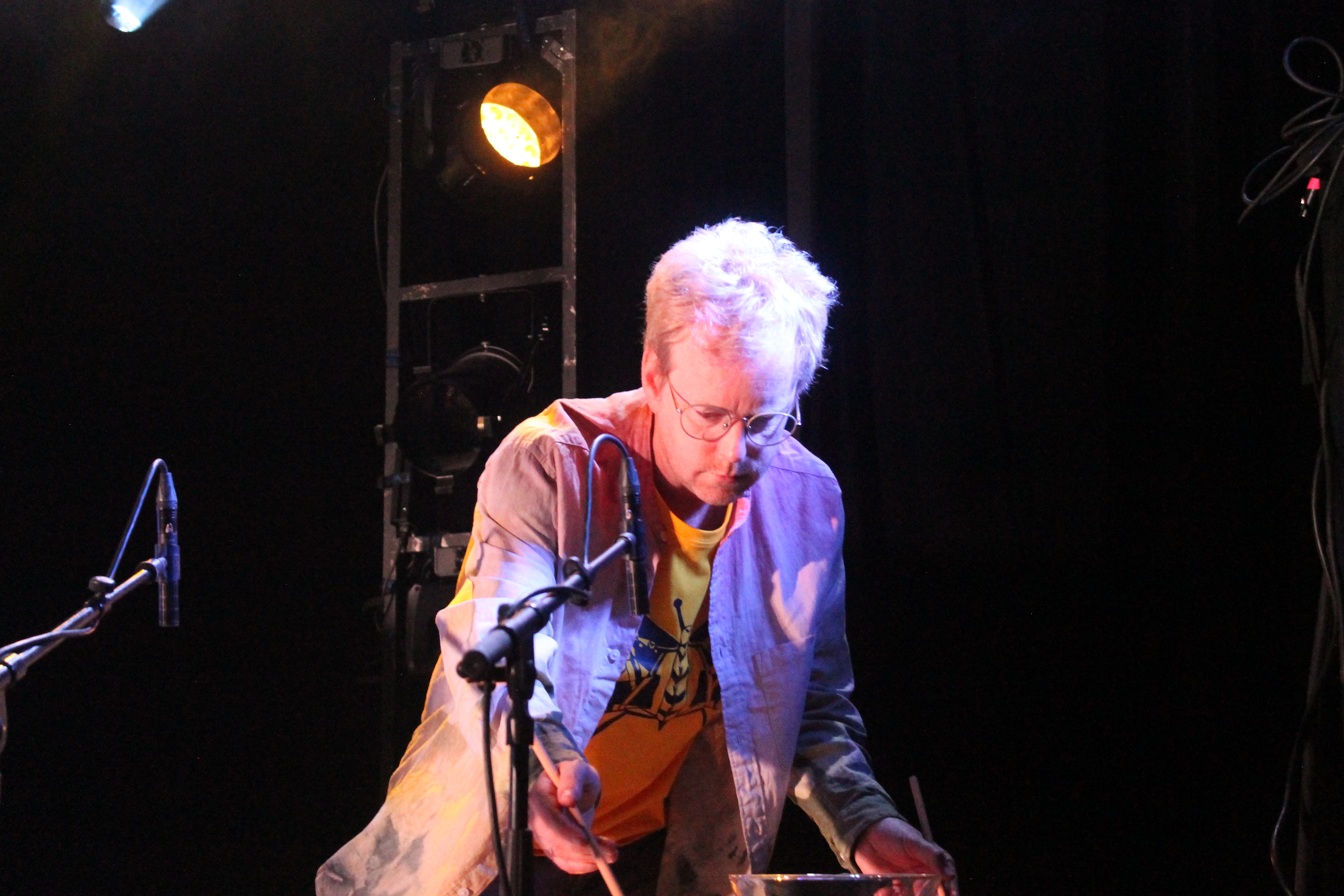
- Stian at Moldejazz 2023

Background information
- Born: 5 May 1980 (age 46); Ålesund, Møre og Romsdal
- Origin: Norway
- Genres: Jazz
- Occupations: Musician, composer
- Instrument: Trumpet
- Label: NORCD
- Formerly of: PARALLAX, Stian Omenås Ensemble, Lydrommet
- Website: stianomenaas.com

Stian Omenås (born 5 May 1980) is a Norwegian Jazz musician (trumpet), music conductor and composer from Valldal in Fjord Municipality, Sunnmøre, known as leader of his own band Stian Omenås Ensemble and ""PARALLAX", and from collaborations with musicians like Louis Sclavis (FR), Terje Rypdal, Kenny Wheeler (UK), Django Bates (UK), Esperanza Spalding (US), Jon Balke, Ståle Storløkken, Christian Wallumrød, Frode Alnæs, Kim Myhr, Mats Eilertsen, Rob Waring, Erik Nylander, Eirik Hegdal, Trygve Seim, Nils Økland, Gjermund Larsen, Magnar Åm, Jai Shankar, Mira Craig, Elvira Nicolaisen, Heidi Gjermundsen Brock, Margaret Berger, Nora NoorKenny Wheeler, Petter Wettre, Odd Riisnæs, Thomas Johansson, Hayden Powell, Jacob Young, Jan Gunnar Hoff, Mats Eilertsen, Erik Nylander, Rob Waring, Roger Johansen and Tore Johansen.

== Career ==
Omenås was educated as a jazz trumpeter, trumpet teacher and composer on the Jazz program at Trondheim Musikkonsevatorium. He now resides in Oslo. He is influenced by Miles Davis, Stravinsky, Bartok, Messiaen, Bach, Ligeti, Tom Waits, Björk and Thomas Dybdahl, among others, and currently (2013) working with the bands Stian Omenås Ensemble, Kilombo, Marita Røstad Band, Astrid E. Pedersen Ensemble, Bungalow, Miles Davis Tribute, Circulez with Louis Sclavis, and a solo project.

His album Klangkammer 1 (2012) with his band project Klangkammer, includes Mats Eilertsen (bass), Erik Nylander (drums) and Rob Waring (vibraphone).

== Discography ==
Within Stian Around A Hill Quartet

- 2009: Lille Stille (AIM Sound City)
- 2011: Alle Skal Få (Atterklang)

Within Parallax

- 2010: Live in the UK (FMR Records)
- 2012: Krutthuset (Pling Music)
- 2014: Den tredje dagen (NORCD)

Within Klangkammer

- 2012: Klangkammer 1 (NorCD)
- 2016: Klangkammer 2 (NorCD)
