= Erik Johannessen (musician) =

Norwegian trombonist and composer (born 1975)

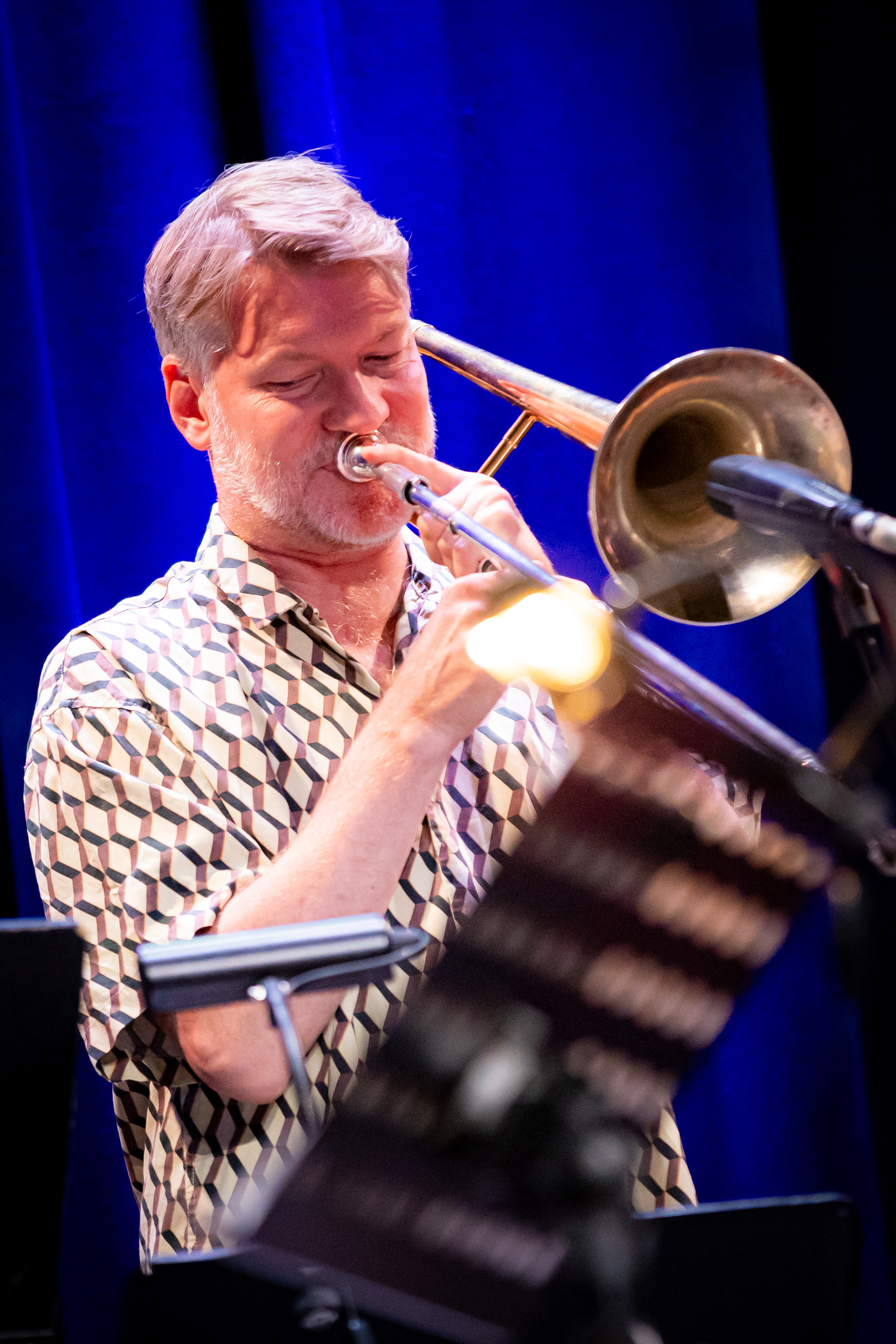
- Erik Johannessen performing at Cosmopolite Scene, Oslo 2025; Photo: Matija Pužar

Background information
- Born: 22 July 1975 (age 50); Oslo, Norway
- Genres: Jazz
- Occupations: Musician, composer
- Instrument: Trombone
- Website: Erik Johannessen on Myspace

Erik Johannessen (born 22 July 1975 in Oslo) is a Norwegian trombonist and composer, who has played in bands like Jaga Jazzist, Wojciech Staroniewicz Quintet, Trondheim Jazz Orchestra, Loud Jazz Band, Lord Kelvin, Funky Hot Grits, Skarbø Skulekorps, Ensemble Denada and Magic Pocket.

== Career ==
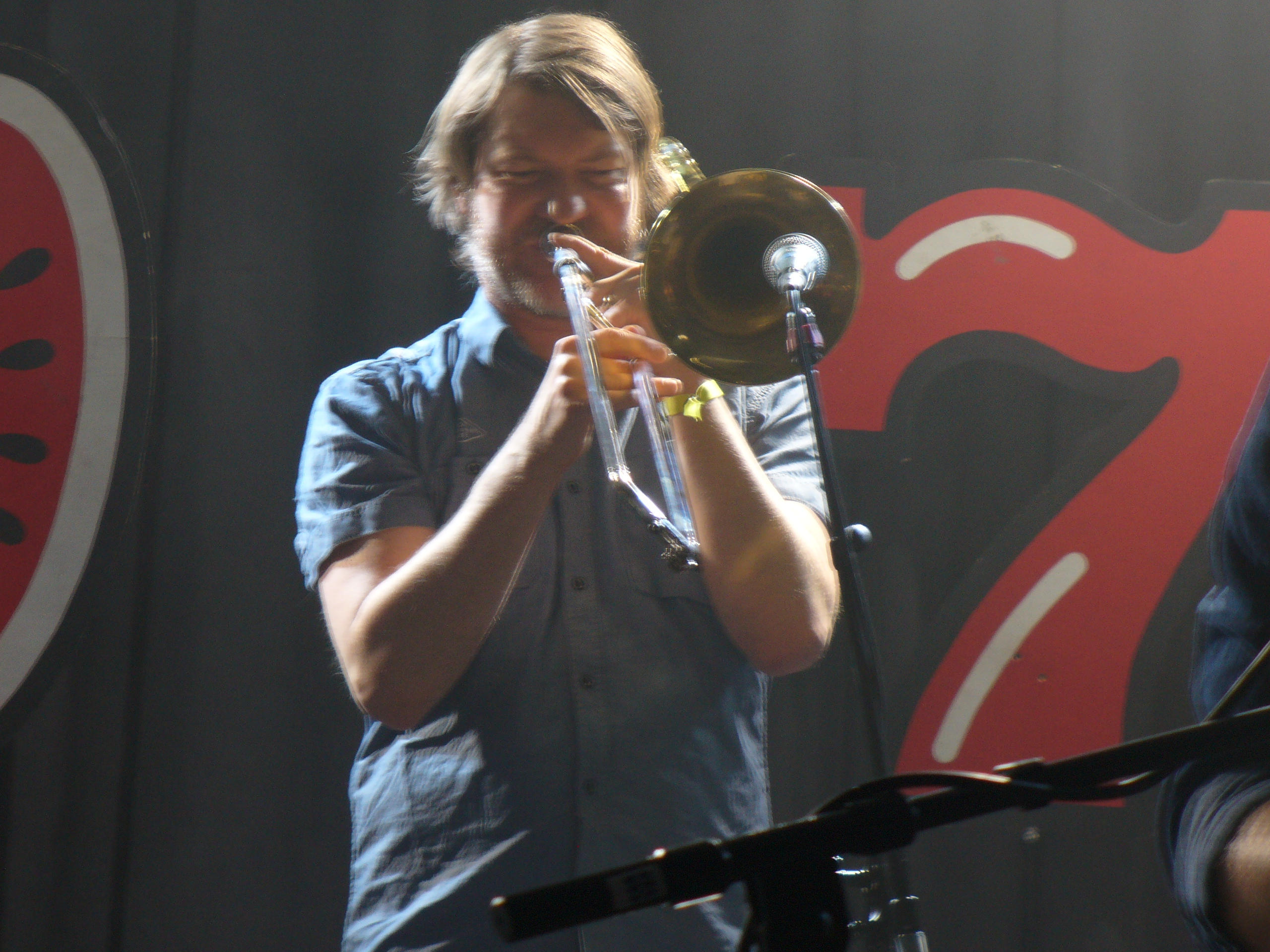
Erik Johannessen at Vossajazz 2014

Johannessen grew up at Lambertseter and was educated in jazz at Trondheim Musikkonservatorium and the University of Oslo. He mainly plays jazz and pop music and works with music in many context. He has toured extensively in Europe and the rest of the world with Jaga Jazzist and Ensemble Denada, in Poland with Loud Jazz Band and Wojciech Staroniewicz Quintet, and in Norway with other bands.

He has played with Trondheim Jazzorkester in projects including Joshua Redman, Eirik Hegdal, Terje Rypdal, Jon Balke, Erlend Skomsvoll, Maria Kannegaard, and his own band, Magic Pocket. He has also released albums with Lord Kelvin and Magic Pocket. He received the Sparebank1 Midtnorges JazZtipendiat 2009/10 with Magic Pocket and was awarded the Spellemannprisen 2010 in open class for the album One-Armed Bandit with Jaga Jazzist, and in the jazz category with Trondheim Jazz Orchestra and GURLS in 2022.

He has conducted, arranged, and composed for bands such as Kjellerbandet, Midtnorsk Ungdomstorband, Follo Big Band, Orkdal Storband, Kristiansund Storband, Vollen Big Band, Travelin' Storband and Sintefstorbandet.

He is currently playing in Meg og kammeraten min together with Martin Hagfors and has released several albums with music for children.

Johannessen composed film music for Knerten og Sjøormen (2020) together with Erlend Mokkelbost.

Johannessen's first solo album Inkblots (2012) is free improvisation accompanied by bassist Jon Rune Strøm from the Frode Gjerstad Trio and Magic Pocket drummer Erik Nylander. He released The Signal (2025) as a trombone and electronics album. Erik Johannessen and The Flying Carpets is a quartet consisting of pianist Isach Skeidsvoll, bassist Ola Høyer and drummer Martin Heggli Mellem, and released an album called Mirror In The Hall (2026)

== Honors ==
- Spellemannprisen 2010 in open class, for the album One-Armed Bandit with Jaga Jazzist
- Spellemannprisen 2022 in jazz for the album Oui with Trondheim Jazz Orchestra and GURLS

== Discography ==
=== As leader ===
- Inkblots (2012)
- the Signal (2025)
- Mirror In The Hall (2026)

=== As sideman ===
Meg og kammeraten min

- Gjenta-jenta' (2016)
- Snydelig' (2017)
- Sjeldne Skjell' (2020)

Wojciech Staroniewicz Quintet

- North Park' (2019)
- Strange Vacation' (2022)
- Live - The Band One Tour' (2025)

Mr.E & Me

- New Orchestral Hits 4 Kids Vol.1' (2019)
- New Orchestral Hits 4 Kids Vol.2' (2023)

With Jaga Jazzist

- One-Armed Bandit (2010)
- Live With Britten Sinfonia (2012)
- Starfire (2015)
- The Pyramid (2020)

With Lord Kelvin

- Dances in the Smoke (2008)
- Radio Has No Future (2011)

With the Loud Jazz Band

- Don't Stop the Train (2004)
- The Way To Salina (2005)
- Passing (2007)
- Living Windows (2008)
- The Silence (2010)

With Magic Pocket & Morten Qvenild

- Katabatic Wind (2011)

With Skarbø Skulekorps

- Innesko (2023)

With Trondheim Jazz Orchestra

- Live in Oslo (2007) with Eirik Hegdal and Maria kannegård
- Wood and Water (2008) with Eirik Hegdal
- Trondheim Jazz orchestra & Kobert with kobert (2009)
- Triads And More (2010), with Eirik Hegdal & Joshua Redman
- Kinetic Music (2011), with Magic Pocket
- Treehouse, with Albatrosh (2014)
- Lion, with Marius Neset (2014)
- Oui, with GURLS (2022)

With others

- Fri (1993) with, Svigermors Drøm
- I Fyr og Flammer (1994, )with Svigermors Drøm
- Devil's Ride (2002), with "Tremolo Wankers"
- Turn on the Lights (2003), with "Jumpin'Jerry"
- Lorenzo is Dead (2003), with "Lorenzo"
- Drops of Hope (2003), with "Seljemark"
- q.s. (2004), with "Acoustic Accident"
- Mingus Schmingus (2004), with "Kjellerbandet"
- Troll (2005), with "Lumsk"
- Gravitasjon (2006), with Dum Dum Boys
- A Few Words (2006), with "Hasselgård"
- Sildsalat (2006), with "Sintefstorbandet"
- The Cheaters (2007), with The Cheaters
- Chronicles (2007), with John Heitman & Marc Gregory
- The Path of Love (2008), with Terje Nordgarden
- Cause And Effect (2008), with Maria Mena
- The Plum Album (2008), with Håkon Ellingsen
- God If I Saw Her Now (2008), with Thom Hell
- Finding Nymo (2009), with Helge Sunde & Ensemble Denada
- Night Blooms (2009), with "The Opium Cartel"
- It's Cold Tonight (2009), with Dan Kristofferson
- Men and Flies (2009), with Martin Hagfors
- Real Life Is No Cool (2010), with Lindstrøm & Christabelle
- The Brothel (2010), With Susanne Sundfør
- All Good Things (2010), with Thom Hell
- Shit Happens (2010), with Raga Rockers
- Det Nærmeste Du Kommer (2011), with John Olav Nilsen & Gjengen
- Migrant (2011), with "The Captain & Me"
- The Architect (2011), with Jens Carelius
- Jonas Alaska (2011), with Jonas Alaska
- When Nobody's Around (2011), with Synne Sanden
- I Like You (2011), with Martin Hagfors
- The Silicone Veil (2012), with Susanne Sundfør
- We Blister and We Bleed (2014), with Tommy Tokyo
- Slow Eastbound Train (2015), Daniel Herskedal trio
- At That Time Of The Night (2016), with Christel Alsos
- The Roc (2017), Daniel Herskedal Trio
- Voyage (2019), Daniel Herskedal Trio
- Call For Winter (2020), Daniel Herskedal
- Jeg tror på stier hvor en kan gå vill, (2020), with Haakon Ellingsen
- Knerten og Sjøormen (2020), with Silya Nymoen and Erlend Mokkelbost
- Logical Fallacies (2021), with Scheen Jazzorkester and Jon Øystein Rosland
- Nonett (2023), with ØyvindLAND
- The Sun Will Do You Good, They Said (2023), with The Other End
- London Dry (2024), with Martin Hagfors and Aslag Haugen
- HYDRA (2025), with Pekula
- Double Reality Beyond Space And Time (2025), with Scheen Jazzorkester and Ståle Storløkken
