= Karl Strømme =

Norwegian jazz trumpeter (born 1976)

- Born: Karl Tomas Bergh Strømme; 26 February 1976 (age 50); Bergen, Hordaland
- Origin: Norway
- Genres: Jazz
- Occupation: Musician
- Instruments: Multi-instrumentalist, trumpet
- Label: Parallell Records

Karl Tomas Bergh Strømme (born 26 February 1976 in Bergen, Norway) is a Norwegian jazz trumpeter.

== Biography ==
Strømme got his musical education at Norwegian Academy of Music in Oslo and Rhythmic Music Conservatory in Copenhagen. He has studied under Arve Henriksen, Jon Eberson and Flemming Agerskov. He has been touring in Scandinavia and occasionally in the rest of Europe as a member of The European Youth Jazz Orchestra

He has led the Telenor Storband and teaches music at the Norwegian Academy of Music. Strømme has also composed music for NRK and played regular for theaters like Nationaltheateret, Nordic Black Theatre and Riksteatret. Strømme was raised in Fredrikstad and in Bygdøy, where he also runs his own recording studio DynaLyd.

In 2004 he was the recipient of a scholarships from The Léonie Sonning Music Prize.

Within the band Peloton he has released two albums, Selected Recordings (2007) and The Early Years (2011). Strømme has also collaborated with Jono El Grande, Sandvika Storband, Gunnhild Nyborg, La Mascara Snake and Birgitte Damberg.

== Discography ==
- 1999: Instant Critique (Arbin Prod), with Edvard Bredok
- 1999: Lining Up! (Sandvika Storband), with Sandvika Storband
- 2003: .....Goes Fishing (Osito Records), with La Mascara Snake
- 2003: Fevergreens (Rune Grammofon), with Jono El Grande
- 2007: Selected Recordings (Parallell Records), with Peloton
- 2008: Så Lenge Det Er Natt (Norsk Rock), single with Rex Rudi
- 2009: Corrupted Mirror (Parallell Records), Nickelsen, Strømme, Nylander
- 2011: The Early Years (Parallell Records), with Peloton
