= André Roligheten =

Norwegian jazz saxophonist and composer

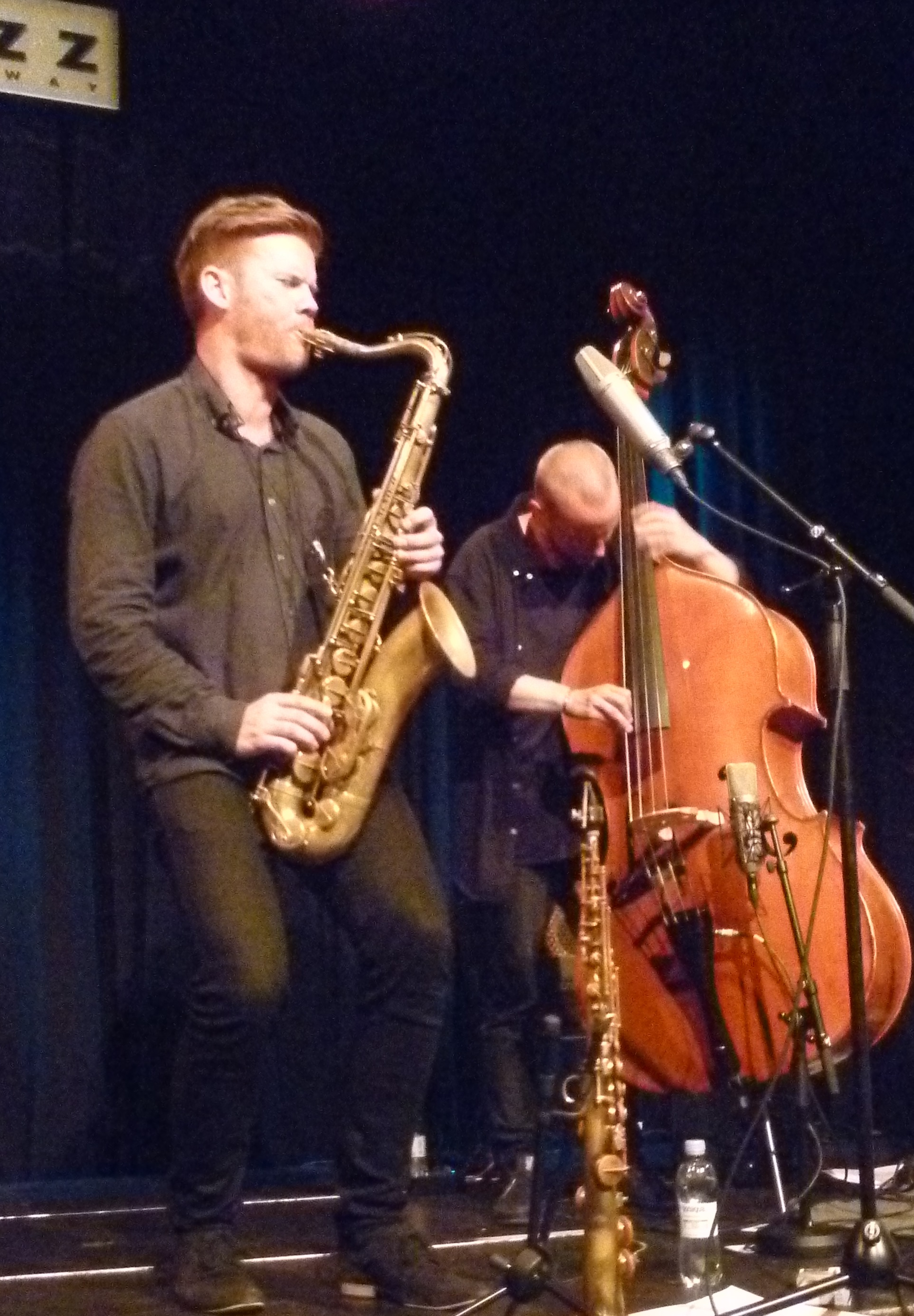
- Roligheten and Petter Eldh with Gard Nilssen's Acoustic Unity at the 2016 Nattjazz in Bergen.

Background information
- Born: 2 January 1985 (age 41); Skien, Telemark
- Origin: Norway
- Genres: Jazz
- Occupations: Musician, composer
- Instruments: Saxophones, clarinets
- Years active: 2009–present
- Labels: Clean Feed, ODIN, Rune Grammofon, Particular
- Spouse: Susanne Sundfør (m. 2022)
- Website: andreroligheten.com

André Roligheten (born 2 January 1985) is a Norwegian jazz musician (saxophone) and composer, known from a series of recordings and bands like Albatrosh and Team Hegdal. He has also played with musicians like Andrew D'Angelo, Theo Bleckmann, Django Bates, John Edwards, Paul Lovens, Axel Dörner, Robin Hayward, Raymond Strid, Bugge Wesseltoft, Mathias Eick, Ola Kvernberg, Paal Nilssen-Love and Per Zanussi.

== Career ==
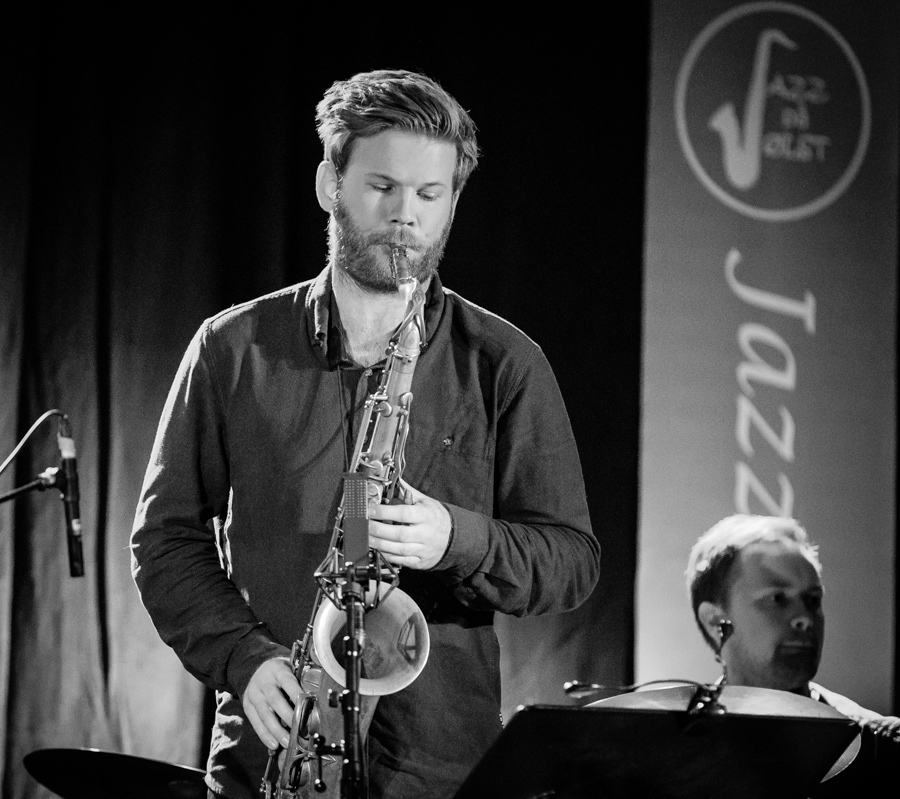
André Roligheten in 2017

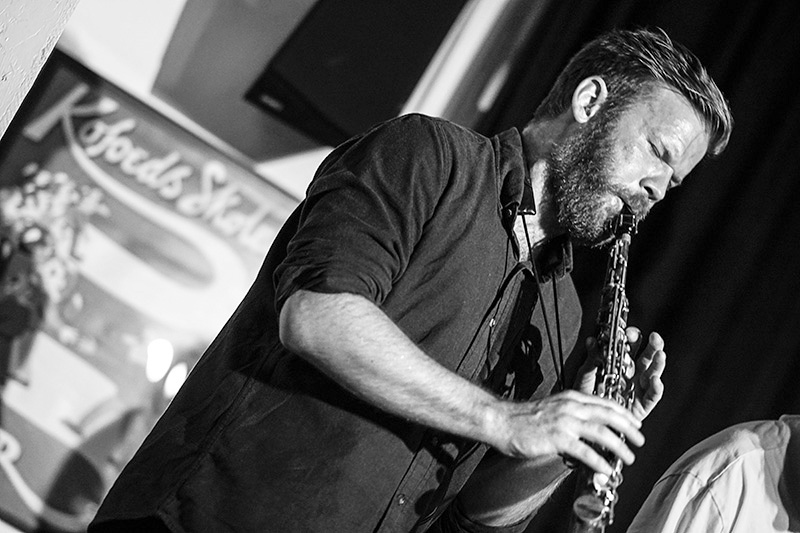
André Roligheten at Copenhagen Jazz Festival (2019)

Roligheten was born in Skien, Norway, and started playing the saxophone at an early age. At only 8 years old he picked up the horn and soon figured it out. He earned a Bachelor's degree from the Jazzprogeram at Trondheim Musikkonsevatorium, under mentors like John Pål Inderberg and Erling Aksdal. In 2008 he finished his Master's degree in improvised music at the Norwegian Academy of Music in Oslo.

Roligheten have played on festivals like Moldejazz, Kongsberg Jazz Festival, Oslo Jazzfestival, North Sea Jazz Festival, Münster Jazz Festival, Süd Tyrol Jazz Festival, 12 Points, Dølajazz, Nattjazz, Jazzfest, MaiJazz, Soddjazz, Vossajazz, and done several tours in Scandinavia, Germany, Poland, Czech Republic, Slovenia, France, Italy, China and US.

== Personal life ==
Roligheten married singer-songwriter Susanne Sundfør in summer 2022.

== Gallery ==
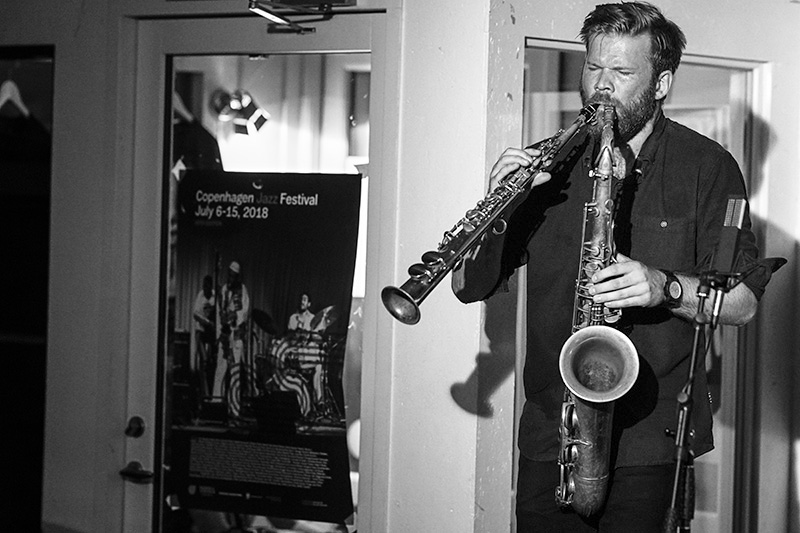
Copenhagen Jazz Festival (2019)

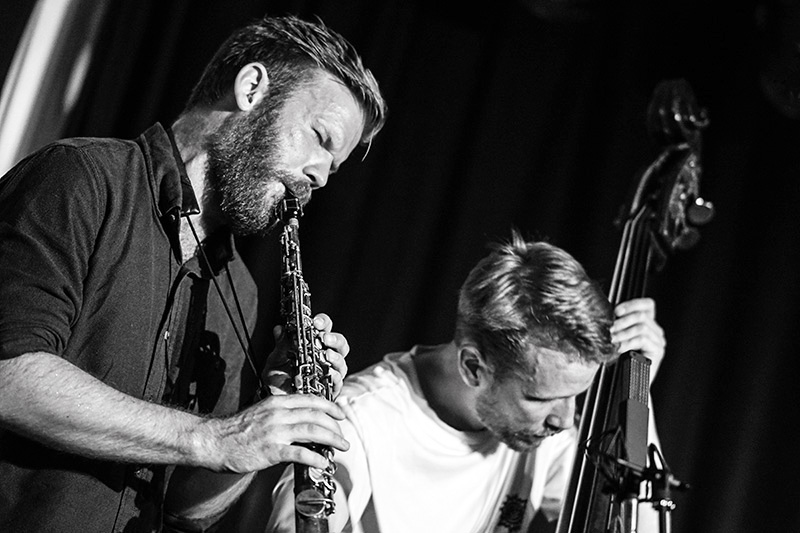
Roligheten and Petter Eldh Copenhagen Jazz Festival (2019)

== Honors ==
- 2008: Young Nordic Jazz Comets, Soloist prize
- 2009: 1st prize – "Best Band" at the European Jazz Competition
- 2012: JazZtipend, awarded by SpareBank 1, Midtnorsk Jazzsenter in Trondheim and Moldejazz
- 2015: Norwegian Grammy, Spellemannprisen 2015, "Jazz" Team Hegdal "Vol.3"

== Discography ==
Roligheten

- 2017: Homegrown (Clean Feed Records)

Albatrosh

- 2009: Seagull Island (Inner Ear)
- 2010: Mystery Orchestra with Grenager & Tafjord (Inner Ear)
- 2011: Yonkers (Rune Grammofon)
- 2014: Night Owl (Rune Grammofon)

Team Hegdal

- 2010: Vol 1 (Øra Fonogram)
- 2011: Vol 2 (Øra Fonogram)
- 2015: Vol 3 (Particular Recordings)
- 2017: Vol 4 (Particular Recordings)

Gard Nilssen´s Acoustic Unity, trio including Petter Eldh

- 2015: Firehouse (Clean Feed Records)
- 2017: Live in Europe (Clean Feed Records)
- 2019: To Whom Who Buys a Record (ODIN)

"Friends & Neighbors»

- 2011: No Beat Policy (Øra Fonogram)
- 2014: Hymn For A Hungry Nation (Clean Feed Records)
- 2016: What´s Wrong? (Clean Feed Records)

With Trondheim Jazz Orchestra

- 2011: Kinetic Music (MNJ Records), with Magic Pocket
- 2013: Tree House (MNJ Records), with Albatrosh
- 2015: Savages (Propeller Recordings), with Kristoffer Lo

With Susanne Sundfør

- 2017: Music For People In Trouble (Sonnet Sound Ltd distributed by Warner Music Norway AS)

With Motorpsycho & Ståle Storløkken

- 2012: The Death Defying Unicorn (Stickman Records, Germany)

Jonas Cambien Trio

- 2016: A Zoology of the Future (Clean Feed Records)

With Eyolf Dale

- 2016: Wolf Valley (Edition Records Ltd.)

Rune Your Day

- 2017: Rune Your Day (Clean Feed Records)

Waldemar 4

- 2015: Waldemar 4 (Gigaforn)

Damana

- 2016: Cornua Copiae (Clean Feed Records)

With Hanne Kolstø

- 2012: Flashblack (Karmakosmetix)
- 2015: While We Still Have Light (Jansen Plateproduksjon)

With "Machina» (including with Kristoffer Lo)

- 2011: So Much For Dancing (Øra Fonogram)

With "The Great Big Taters»

- 2011: Fake It 'Till You Make It (Dayladore Collective)
