= Jo Skaansar =

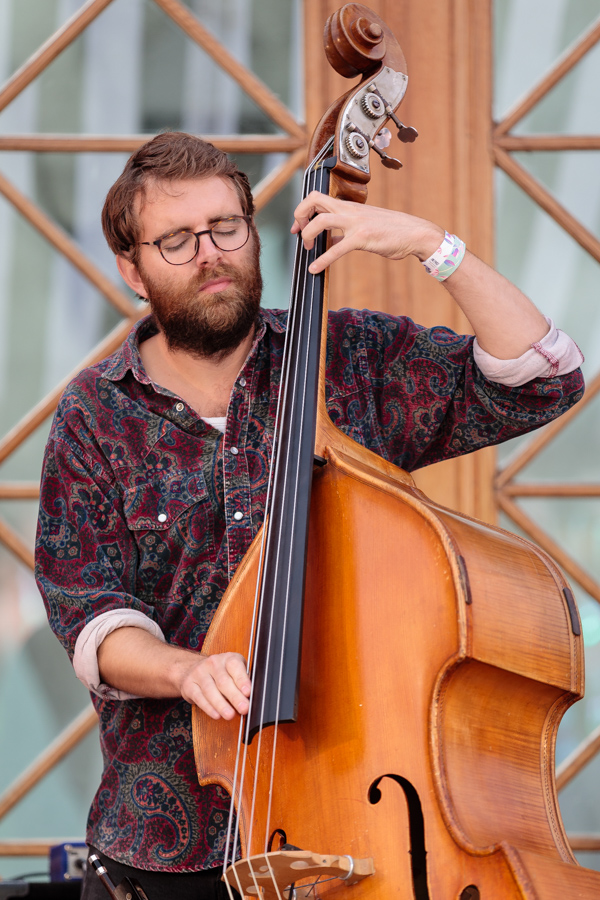
- Jo Skaansar in 2018

Background information
- Born: Jo Fougner Skaansar; 8 July 1984 (age 42); Oslo, Norway
- Origin: Norway
- Genres: Jazz
- Occupations: Musician, composer and psychologist
- Instruments: Upright bass, electric bass
- Labels: Ta:lik, Grappa
- Website: www.joskaansar.com

Jo Fougner Skaansar (born 8 July 1984 in Oslo, Norway) is a Norwegian jazz bassist, composer and clinical psychologist from Lillehammer.

== Career ==
Skaansar studied music at the Sund Folk High School, the jazz program at Norwegian University of Science and Technology and earned a Master's degree in jazz bass on Norwegian Academy of Music in Oslo 2010.

He has released the albums Den blåaste natt (2010) og Fange av mi tid (2019). Both albums feature vocalist Ine Hoem as well as lyricist Edvard Hoem on several songs.

Skaansar was awarded the 2006 Postens Talentpris, the 2008 Lillehammer Kommunes Kulturstipend and 2009 Oppland Fylkeskommunes kunstnerstipend. He also was the winner of the 2012 Open class at Landskappleiken together with Camilla Granlien.

== Discography ==
=== Solo albums ===
- Melanie Scholtz & Jo Skaansar: Kindred. Grappa Musikkforlag (2022)
- Jo Skaansar: Fange av mi tid. Grappa Musikkforlag (2019)
- Jo Skaansar: Den Blåaste Natt. Ta:lik (2010)

=== Collaborations ===
- Hayden Powell: Undergrowth. Periskop (2024)
- Jon Larsen, Ola Erlien, Gustav Skaaret: No Man’s Land. Hot Club Records (2024)
- Bjørn Kåre Odde: Folk Chamber II. Melovitten (2024)
- Fjellvang: Songs From The Reading Room. DaWorks (2024)
- Moksha: Embracing. Jazzland/OK World (2024)
- LILJA: In Your Arms [single]. Jazzland (2024)
- Vegar Vårdal: Folkemusikk for unge strykere. Slåtter fra Agder. Ta:lik (2023)
- LILJA: Mirage. Jazzland (2023)
- Vegar Vårdal: Waldemar Thrane. Ta:lik (2022)
- Kajsa Balto: Mun sakka illudan – In Sweet Rejoicing (live) [single]. DAT (2022)
- Becaye: Diaspora. Global Sonics (2022)
- Solfrid Molland: Marias Sang [single]. Kirkelig Kulturverksted (2021)
- De La Romance: Grand baiser français [single]. Metamusica (2021)
- Kajsa Balto: Sámi juovllat – Sámi Christmas. DAT (2021)
- Guorga: Guorga. DAT (2021)
- Mánaídmeannu: Emma Elliane, «Oahppat». DAT (2021)
- Ole Børud, Maria Solheim, Lewi Bergrud: Julefred [single]. Norges Kristne Råd/Grammofon (2020)
- Håp – Musikk for medmenneskelighet: Oddrun Lilja, «Mémoire». OK World Records (2020)
- Siri Stranger: Julestjerne [single]. Oslo Records, distributed by Universal Music AS, Norway (2020)
- Jakop Janssønn: Bricoleur. Finito Bacalao Records (2020)
- LILJA: Marble. Jazzland (2020)
- Haakon Ellingsen: Jeg tror på stier hvor en kan gå vill. Ellingsongs (2020)
- Mari Skeie Ljones: Ein skyttel full av song. Ta:lik (2020)
- Morten Reppesgård: Places [single]. Hysj Records (2020)
- Morten Reppesgård: Closed Doors [single]. Hysj Records (2020)
- Lady Hardanger: Some Drama. Rural Rebel Rock (2020)
- Keiino: Storbyjul (live fra Håp i ei gryte) [single]. Hugoworld (2019)
- Camilla Granlien: Jeg går i tusen tanker. Ta:lik (2019)
- Tokso: Fyrsta Morginn – Music for Voluspá, Heilo/Grappa Musikkforlag (2018)
- Hayden Powell: Six Commissions. Periskop (2018)
- Lady Hardanger: Lost Country. Kinkverk 2018)
- Lena Nymark: Trapped In The Silence. New Field Music (2017)
- Camilla Granlien med band: Dyr og rare kjerringer. Ta:lik (2017)
- Espen Rud: Carla. The Fish. Curling Legs (2017)
- Pernille Øiestad: Helt på ekte. DaWorks (2017)
- Kristoffer Kompen: Sundown (2017). Kompis Records
- Lady Hardanger: Young Blood. Kinkverk (2016)
- Jakop Janssønn & Ville Langfeldt: STUP (Original Motion Picture Soundtrack). Sviskemaskin (2015)
- Båsmokoret, Tor-Petter Aanes, Helge Stangnes: Tid. Båsmokoret (2015)
- Hayden Powell: Circadian Rhythm and Blues. Periskop (2015)
- Camilla Granlien: Kjære vennen min. Ta:lik (2015)
- Mari Skeie Ljones: Spring du fela. Ta:lik (2015)
- Julestemmer: Tenne ti ljøsi. Ta:lik (2015)
- Trondheim Jazz Orchestra & Elin Rosseland: Ekko. MNJ Records (2014)
- Tore Johansen: The Set. Inner Ear Records (2014)
- Kristoffer Kompen: Agdergata 1. Kompis Records (2014)
- Julius Winger: Under Linden, viser av Robert Levin. Grappa Musikkforlag (2013)
- Hayden Powell: Roots and Stems. Periskop (2013)
- Sølvguttene; Kudsi Erguner: Pervane - Fløyet fra Guds hånd. Kirkelig Kulturverksted (2013)
- Stine Hole Ulla: Verden blir hvit. DaWorks Records (2013)
- Bror K: Bror K. Selskapsplater (2013)
- Tore Johansen: Double Rainbow. Inner Ear (2012)
- Rhys Marsh & the Autumn Ghost: The Blue Hour. Termo Records (2012)
- Solfrid Molland: Songs Without Borders. Transcend (2012)
- Kristoffer Kompen: Short Stories Of Happiness. Schmell (2011)
- Camilla Granlien/Kristin Sevaldsen: Aftenstemning. Ta:lik (2011)
- Urban Tunélls Klezmerband: In Der Fintster. Curling Legs (2011)
- Hayden Powell: The Attic. Inner Air (2011)
- Solfrid Molland: Katedral For Tapte Drømmer. Kirkelig Kulturverksted (2011)
- Melanie Scholtz: Connected. Loudberry (SA) (2010)
- Melanie Scholtz: Living Standards. Loudberry (SA) (2010)
- Nils Bech: Look Back. Fysisk Format (2010)
- Green Serene & Per Jørgensen: Living Live. AIM (2010)
- Kåre Kolve Quartet: Further Directions. Curling Legs (2010)
- Carol Kvande: Mango. Vinterland Studio (2010)
- Rhys Marsh & the Autumn Ghost: Dulcima. Termo Records (2010)
- Kåre Kolve Quartet: My Direction. Curling Legs (2009)
- Rhys Marsh & the Autumn Ghost: The Fragile State Of Inbetween. Better Place Recordings (2008)
- Legopulver: Legopulver. Bergland Productions, Nature Bliss (JP) (2007)
