= Steinar Nickelsen =

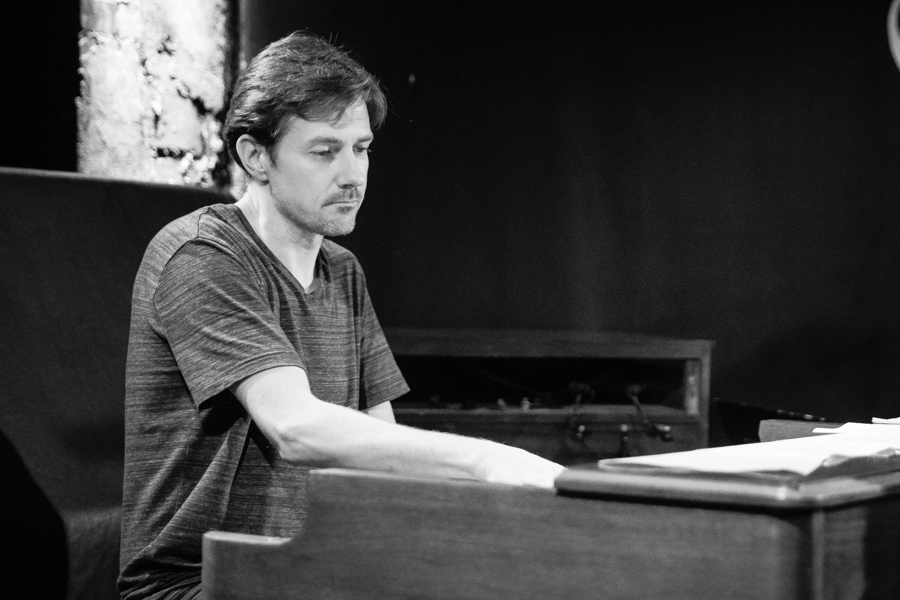
- Steinar Nickelsen performing in 2019

Background information
- Born: Steinar Sønk Nickelsen; 5 October 1978 (age 48); Oslo
- Origin: Norway
- Genre: Jazz
- Occupations: Musician and composer
- Instruments: Hammond organ, piano
- Labels: Parallell Records; Calibrated Records
- Website: steinar.eu

Steinar Sønk Nickelsen (born 5 October 1978) is a Norwegian jazz musician (Hammond organ and piano) from Bærum, known from several bands and album releases.

== Biography ==
Nickelsen was born in Oslo, and became well known in Norway when he was awarded the Young jazz musician of the year award at Moldejazz in 2002, within the band Solid!. In Oslo he played in a trio with Pål Thowsen and Jon Eberson releasing the album (2002).After this he attended the jazz program at Trondheim Musikkonservatorium, joined the Trondheim Jazz Orchestra and recorded with Pat Metheny. He then studied at the Norwegian Academy of Music in Oslo, IACP in Paris and got his church music education in Trondheim.

Moreover, he collaborated in the band Jupiter with Håvard Stubø and Magnus Forsberg who released several albums. In Peloton he played with the guitarist Petter Vågan, the drummer Erik Nylander, saxophonist Hallvard Godal and trumpeter Karl Strømme. He also was smaller ensembles led by Jacob Holm and Mats Thorsen. He moved to Copenhagen (2004) for studies at the Rhythm Conservatory, where he led the Nickelsen Trio with drummer Ari Hoenig and guitarist Lage Lund at the time. He also figures on the New York City music scene, and recently played in the trio Excess Luggage with pianist Vigleik Storaas and drummer Håkon Mjåset Johansen releasing the album Excess Luggage (2007) and Hand Luggage Only (2011), as well as in a trio with the guitarist Nils-Olav Johansen and drummer Truls Rønning.

Nickelsen now resides in Shanghai.

== Discography ==
- 2002: ... The Rest Is Rumours (Curling Legs), with Pål Thowsen, Jon Eberson
- 2003: Live In Getxo (Hilargi Records), with Solid!
- 2004: Ignition (AIM Records), with Jupiter
- 2006: Live At Glenn Miller Café (AIM Records), with Jupiter feat. Jonas Kullhammar
- 2007: III2 (AIM Records), with Jupiter feat. Jonas Kullhammar
- 2007: Mise En Bouteille À New York (Calibrated Records), Nickelsen Trio including Lage Lund, Ari Hoenig
- 2007: Excess Luggage (Park Grammofon), Nickelsen / Storaas / Mjåset Johansen
- 2007: Selected Recordings (Parallell Records), with Peloton
- 2009: Corrupted Mirror (Parallell Records), Nickelsen, Strømme, Nylander
- 2011: Hand Luggage Only (Parallell Records), with Excess Luggage
- 2011: The Early Years (Parallell Records), with Peloton
- 2012: Dear You (ParalParallellell Records), with Monkeybar duo including Erik Nylander
