= Jacob Koranyi =

Swedish cellist (born 1983)

Jakob Koranyi (born 28 May 1983 in Stockholm) is a Swedish cellist with Hungarian background as the family name indicates (Korányi). He won the Swedish Young Musician competition in 2002, The Ljunggrenska Prize in 2004 and the Swedish Soloist Prize in 2006.

He is winner of 2nd Grand Prix and special prize for best interpretation of the Shostakovich Concerto No. 1 at the Rostropovich Competition in Paris in 2009.

He has been awarded prizes and scholarships from numerous international festivals and foundations, such as the Prix d'Honneur and Ferminich Prize at the Verbier Festival in Switzerland.

He has also won all the major Swedish competitions including the prestigious Swedish Soloist Prize in 2006 that launched his debut recording with works by Brahms, Britten, and Ligeti to great critical praise.

Jakob Koranyi is a member of The Chamber Music Society of Lincoln Center's CMS Two program.
