= Stein Ove Berg =

Norwegian singer and songwriter

- Born: 22 December 1948
- Died: 17 June 2002 (aged 53); Oslo
- Occupations: Singer; Songwriter
- Notable work: "Manda morra blues" "Kommer nå" Visa di

Stein Ove Berg (22 December 1948 – 17 June 2002) was a Norwegian singer and songwriter.

Berg hailed from Kløfta. He had a musical breakthrough with the song "Manda morra blues" in 1973, and his song "Kommer nå" from 1974 was well received. He was awarded Spellemannprisen for the 1975 album Visa di. His song books include Hestehov og brun beis from 1973, Albumblad from 1975, and 58 viser from 1979.

== Legacy ==
When Berg died in Oslo in June 2002, leader of the Labour Party, Jens Stoltenberg, wrote an obituary in Aftenposten. A tributary album to Berg was issued in 2005, where his songs were performed by Henning Kvitnes, Hilde Heltberg, Roy Lønhøiden and others. Jonas Fjeld recorded the song "Stein Ove" to his honour in 2009.
