= Magic Pocket =

Norwegian jazz band

- Origin: Trondheim, Norway
- Genres: Jazz
- Years active: 2002–present
- Labels: Bolage
- Members: Hayden Powell; Erik Johannessen; Daniel Herskedal; Erik Nylander
- Website: Magic Pocket on Myspace

Magic Pocket (established 2002 in Trondheim, Norway) is a Norwegian jazz band initiated by students on the Jazz program at Trondheim Musikkonsevatorium.

== Career ==
Magic Pocket is a Brass Band in miniature, performing music in the open area between jazz, rock, world and contemporary music. The quartet was included in the launch contest «JazzIntro» 2004, and contributed on the festivals Nattjazz, Dølajazz and Moldejazz. Magic Pocket was awarded «JazZtipendiat» in 2009/2010. This scholarship, which is awarded by «Midtnorsk Jazzsenter», Moldejazz and Sparebank 1, amounts 250,000 Norwegian kroner and gives the recipient the opportunity to write a piece commissioned to Trondheim Jazz Orchestra performed at Moldejazz the year after. The album The Katabatic Wind (2011), where they are reinforced by the guest keyboardist Morten Qvenild (known from bands like «In the Country», «Susanna and the Magical Orchestra»), is the quartet's first and so far (2013) only release beside the recording of the commissioned work Kinetic Music (2011).

== Personnel ==
- Hayden Powell - trumpet
- Erik Johannessen - trombone
- Daniel Herskedal - tuba
- Erik Nylander - drums

== Honors ==
- 2004: «JazzIntro» finalist
- 2009: «JazZtipendiat»

== Discography ==
- 2011: The Katabatic Wind (Bolage Records), feat. Morten Qvenild
- 2011: Kinetic Music (MNJ Records), feat. Trondheim Jazz Orchestra
