= Bjørn Bolstad Skjelbred =

Norwegian composer (born 1970)

Bjørn Bolstad Skjelbred (born 1970) is a Norwegian composer, arranger, improviser and teacher.

== Career ==
Skjelbred was educated at the Norwegian Academy of Music. He has composed more than 60 works across a variety of genres, including solo and chamber music, electro-acoustic pieces, works for sinfonietta and orchestra, as well as film and theatre scores. He has collaborated with various groups, ensembles, and performers, including theatre collective De Utvalgte, percussionist Eirik Raude, ensemble Pärlor for svin, Nordic Voices, Ensemble 2000, and flautist Marianne Leth.

Skjelbred's works have seen performances in the Nordic countries, Germany, France, the US, and Canada at festivals such as Ultima Oslo Contemporary Music Festival, Ilios, and UKM.

Parallel to his compositional career, Skjelbred teaches composition and improvisation. He has also served as deputy director of Ny Musikk Oslo and as a member of the board for the Norwegian Society of Composers.

=== Selected works ===
==== Large ensembles ====
- Different Rooms (2017)
- On Shaking Ground commissioned by Manger Musikklag (2015)
- Shadows of an Anthem II - 2014, commissioned and premiered by Oslo Philharmonic Orchestra (2014)
- Wave-Chains [Liquid reconstruction 1] – Sinfonietta (2005)
- Shadows of an Anthem Commissioned by the Norwegian Radio Orchestra (2004–2005)
- Inside a moving Spiral, (2002)
- In a different Light, (1997–2001)
- Evolving, (1998)
- Trippelkonsert, Sinfonietta og Fagott/Cello/Slagverk-solister Dur. 20'30", (1993–1995)
- Oppvåkning, (1993–1994)

==== Small ensembles ====
- as the wind behaves (2015)
- ConVergEnce (2013)
- In ruins (2016)
- Strykekvartett No.1 ”Fallen Angels” (2005–2006)
- 3 Studies for Saxophone Quartet, (2006)
- Cycles (2006)
- 2 Pieces for String-Ensemble, (2004/05)
- 3 Pieces for 4 Accordions , (2003)
- Cycles, (2001)
- 3 Studies for 4 Alt-Saxes, (2001)
- 4 Studies for 3 Flutes, (2001)
- 3 Grooves, (2001–2003)
- 3 Grooves, (2001–2002)

==== Solo ====
- Nothing has Changed Everything is New (2012/2014)
- NYX Dur. 9'30" (2013)
- Recognizing the Undercurrent 1 Dur. 8 (2013)
- IYOU, (2005)
- Waves & Interruptions, (2005)
- Music for restless Minds, (2002–2003)
- 22 små Klavérstykker (2001–2002)
- Breathe, (1999)
- Rising, (1998)
- Head or Gut?, (1996)
- Stream, (1995)
- Moves, (1992–1993)

==== Music for young performers ====
- Don Giovanni : Remake (2012)
- Polyfonia (2009)
- Inside a moving Spiral (2002)
- Oppvåkning (1995)
- 3 Studies for Saxophone Quartet (2006)
- Cycles (2006)
- 2 Pieces for String-Ensemble (2004/05)
- 3 Pieces for 4 Accordeons (2003)
- Cycles , (2001)
- 3 Studies for 4 Alt-Saxes (2001)
- 4 Studies for 3 Flutes, (2001)
- 3 Grooves (2001–2003)
- 3 Grooves (2001–2002)
- E, (2000)
- Echoes & Turns, 4 (1998)
- Nocturnal Transition (2006)
- Hall of Mirrors (2004)
- Floating Upwards (2002)
- Bølger-Stille (2000)
- 22 små Klavérstykker (2001–2002)

=== Discography ===
- Erlend Aagard-Nilsen, Perpetuum Trompetuum (2015)
- Roy Henning Snyen, Preludes for Guitar (2015)
- Bjørn Bolstad Skjelbred, Waves & Interruptions (2014)
- The London Schubert Players, A European Odyssey (2012)
- European Odyssey CD Series, Enescus Farewell (2011)
- European Odyssey CD Series, Les Enfants du Paradis (2011)
- Urban Visions, Urban Songs (2005)
- Live Maria Roggen & Lars Andreas Haug, [TU´BA] (2005)
