= Trondheim Jazz Festival =

Annual music festival in Norway

Trondheim Jazz Festival Jazzfest Trondheim
- Status: Active
- Genre: Jazz Festival
- Date: Mid May
- Begins: 7 May 2015
- Ends: 10 May 2015
- Frequency: Annually
- Location: Trondheim
- Country: Norway
- Years active: 1979 - present
- Website: jazzfest.no

Trondheim Jazz Festival or Jazzfest Trondheim (initiated 1979 in Trondheim, Norway under the name JazzMazz) is an annual music festival held in spring time.

== History ==
The festival is a continuation of JazzMazz (1979–1994), and changed name to Jazzfest in 1994. It is centered on the Jazz program at NTNU, and the 25th anniversary in 2004 was dedicated to them. The festival is a collaborative arrangement between Trondheim Jazzforum, the venue Blæst, Trondheim Symphony Orchestra, Studentersamfundet i Trondhjem, Dokkhuset and Norsk jazzforum. The first leader was Bjørn Willadsen, followed by Ernst-Wiggo Sandbakk. From 2007 they have been giving the «talentprisen» award, and initiated a long lasting financial cooperation with the NTNU.
