= Albatrosh =

Norwegian jazz duo and composers

- Origin: Skien, Norway
- Genres: Jazz
- Years active: 2006–present
- Labels: Rune Grammofon; Inner Ear
- Members: Eyolf Dale; André Roligheten
- Website: Official website

Albatrosh (established 2006 in Skien, Norway) is a Norwegian jazz duo performing their own musical compositions described as dense and dynamic.

== Biography ==
Albatrosh has played a series of concerts at home and abroad since its inception, including at festivals Vossajazz, Moldejazz, DølaJazz, Oslo Jazzfestival, Südtirol Jazz Festival, 12 Points! (Dublin), North Sea Jazz Festival and the London Jazz Festival. The band members have distinguished themselves as key players on the young Norwegian jazz scene. Both have a background in jazz education at Trondheim Musikkonsevatorium (NTNU) and Norges Musikkhøgskole.

== Personnel ==
- Eyolf Dale - piano
- André Roligheten - saxophone

== Honors ==
- "JazZtipendiat" granted by Midtnorsk Jazzsenter, SMN SpareBank1 and Moldejazz
- "Best Group" in «European Jazz Competition» 2009
- Albatrosh was in 2008 titled «Årets unge jazzmusikere» av Rikskonsertene and the Norwegian Jazz Federstion.
- Finalist in Young Nordic Jazz Comets in 2008, which was held in Copenhagen, Denmark
- Soloist award in «Young Nordic Jazz Comets» 2008, awarded the saxophonist André Roligheten

== Discography ==
- 2009: Seagull Island (Inner Ear)
- 2010: Mystery Orchestra with Grenager & Tafjord (Inner Ear)
- 2011: Yonkers (Rune Grammofon)
- 2014: Tree House with Trondheim Jazz Orchestra (MNJ Records)
- 2014: Night Owl (Rune Grammofon)
