= Hayden Powell =

British-Norwegian jazz trumpeter and composer

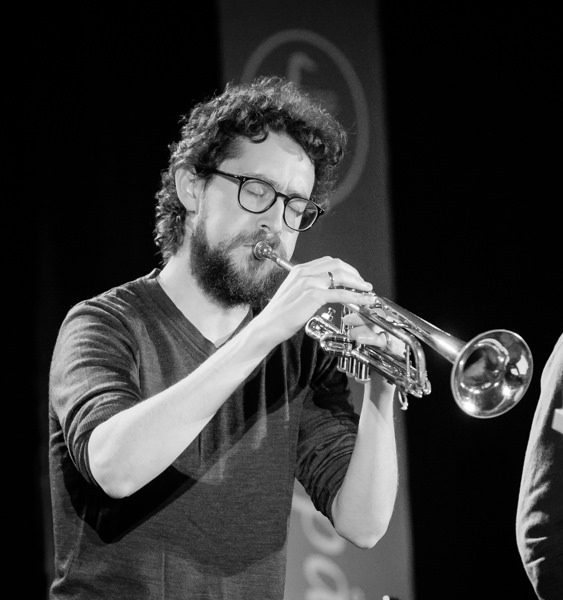
- October, 2017

Background information
- Born: Hayden James Richard Powell; 25 September 1983 (age 42)
- Origin: England
- Genres: Jazz
- Instrument: Trumpet
- Labels: Inner Ear, Periskop, Edition, ECM, Odin
- Website: haydenpowell.com

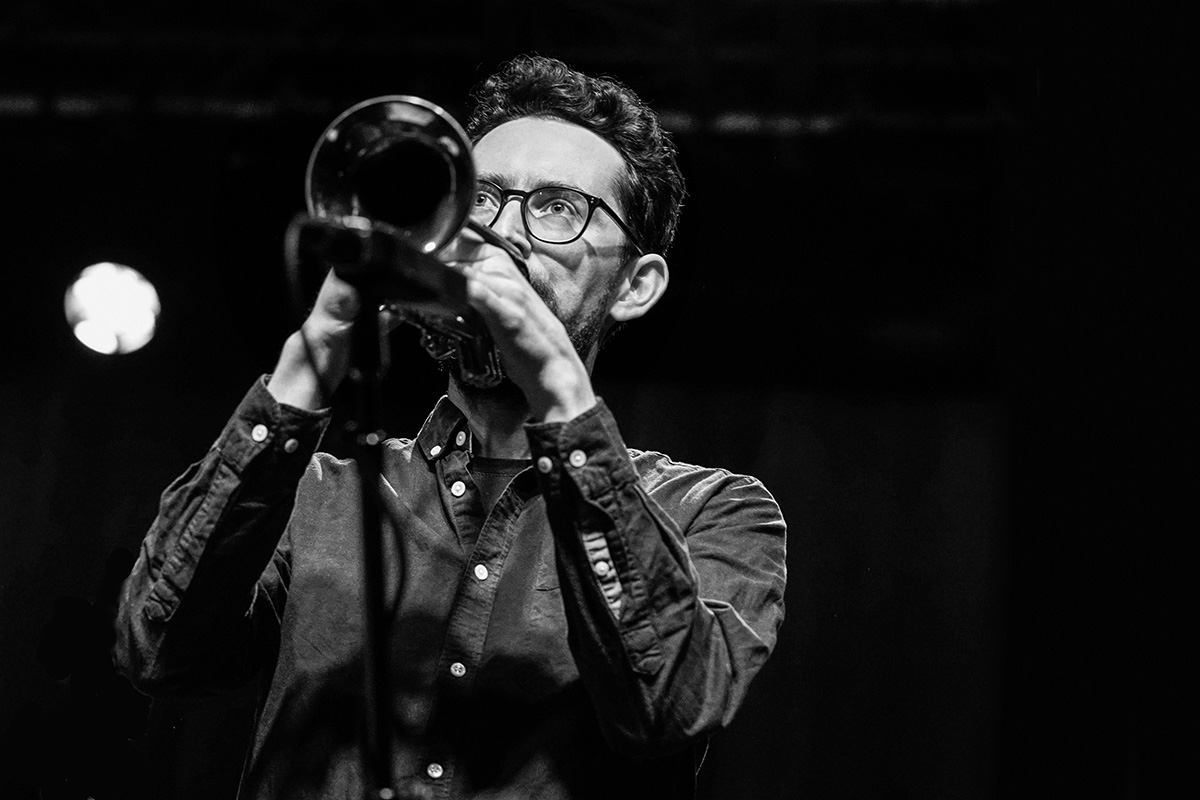
Hayden Powell with Bridges band, 2019 Aarhus (Denmark) Photo Hreinn Gudlaugsson

Hayden James Richard Powell (born 25 September 1983 in England) is a jazz trumpeter and composer based in Oslo, Norway. Powell is English, but moved to Norway as a child and grew up in Molde. He has collaborated with numerous musicians including Terje Rypdal, Kenny Wheeler, Eirik Hegdal, Vigleik Storaas, Nils-Olav Johansen, Ole Morten Vågan, Eyolf Dale, and Ståle Storløkken, and released his debut solo album The Attic in 2011.

== Career ==
Powell holds a bachelor in Performing jazz from the Jazz program at Trondheim Musikkonservatorium (2006), and completed the masters at Norges Musikkhøgskole in 2011. He started his career at 13 in the jazz band Dixi in Molde, they released four albums.

Early in his career, Powell played with groups such as Magic Pocket, Trondheim Jazz Orchestra and Jens Carelius in addition to his own trio. Powell received jazz scholarship from "Sparebank 1" at Moldejazz (2006), "Trondheim jazzfestivals" talent award (2009), and was with the band Magic Pocket JazZtipendiat in 2009/2010. The scholarship was accompanied by a commissioned work which was documented on the album Kinetic Music with Trondheim Jazz Orchestra & Magic Pocket.

More recently, Powell has played and recorded with musicians and small groups such as Eyolf Dale, Espen Berg, Natacha Atlas, Solfrid Molland, Iro Haarla, og Bridges with Seamus Blake. He has also appeared with larger ensembles such as Trondheim Jazzorkester, Scheen Jazzorkester og Oslo Jazzensemble & Maria Schneider.

Hayden Powell has released four albums under his own name. His first, The Attic, was released on the Inner Ear label in 2011, and was recorded by his trio with pianist Eyolf Dale and bassist Jo Skaansar, as well as guest musicians Jasper Van Hulten (drums), Tore Brunborg (saxophone) and Erik Johannessen (trombone). The trio with Dale/Skaansar became Powell's regular band in the period that followed, and together they recorded the albums, Roots and Stems (2013), Circadian Rhythm and Blues (2015) and Six Commissions (2018). The latter album consists of six tracks specially written for the trio by various composers (including Erlend Skomsvoll, Espen Reinertsen and Per "Texas" Johansson). The album "Circadian Rhythm and Blues" consists of two parts, one with the trio, and the other where Powell plays completely solo, recorded in Tøyen Church in collaboration with producer Øyvind Røsrud Gundersen.

In addition to his performance activities, Powell has been involved in teaching, and since 2015 has been a university lecturer at the Norwegian Academy of Music, where he has taught subjects including trumpet, arranging, ear training and ensemble playing.

As composer Powell, in addition to the aforementioned, has written commission works for big band (e.g. "Midtnorsk Ungdomsstorband", "Big Boss Band", "Ett Fett Storband"), wind bands ("Luftforsvarets Musikkorps", "Bispehaugen Ungdomskorps") and a number of smaller ensembles. He has also written a mini-opera based on the novel about «Dr Jekyll and Mr Hyde» (2006), and made musical arrangements to Jens Carelius' album The Architect (2011).

== Discography (in selection) ==
=== Solo albums ===
- 2011: The Attic (Inner Ear), as Hayden Powell Trio including Eyolf Dale & Jo Skaansar
- 2013: Roots and Stems (Periskop)
- 2015: Circadian Rhythm & Blues (Periskop)
- 2018: Six Commissions (Periskop), with Hayden Powell
- 2024: Undergrowth (Periskop), with Hayden Powell

=== Collaborations ===
With Dixi

- 1998: Just Over in the Dixi-Land
- 1999: Some of Those Days
- 2002: Going to the Mardi Gras (Herman Records)
- 2005: The New Orleans Sessions

With Trondheim Jazz Orchestra

- 2006: Tribute (MNJ Records), with Vigleik Storaas
- 2007: Live in Oslo (MNJ Records), with Maria Kannegaard Trio
- 2009: Live at Moldejazz (MNJ Records), with Kobert
- 2009: What if: A Counterfactual Fairytale (MNJ records), with Erlend Skomsvoll
- 2011: Kinetic Music (MNJ Records), with Magic Pocket
- 2011: Migrations (MNJ Records), with Øyvind Brække
- 2014: Tree House (MNJ Records), with Trondheim Jazzorkester & Albatrosh
- 2024: Maetrix (ODIN), with Espen Berg

With others

- 2009: Vi som ser i mørket (Grappa Music), with Siri Nilsen
- 2009: Live at Dokkhuset (Komponist og dirigent, MNJ Records), with "Midtnorsk Ungdomsstorband"
- 2010: Den Blåaste Natt (Talik Records), with Jo Skaansar
- 2011: The Katabatic Wind (Bolage Records), with Magic Pocket & Morten Qvenild
- 2011: The Architect (Jansen Plateproduksjon), with Jens Carelius
- 2011: Katedral For Tapte Drømmer (Kirkelig Kulturverksted), with Solfrid Molland
- 2016: BRIDGES with Seamus Blake (AMP), with Bridges
- 2016: Cornua Copiae (Clean Feed), with DaMaNa
- 2016: Ante Lucem (ECM), with Iro Haarla
- 2016: Forvandling (Kirkelig Kulturverksted), with Solfrid Molland
- 2016: Wolf Valley (Edition Records), with Eyolf Dale
- 2016: Regnbueponniens Significante Påskesang (Periskop), with Significant Time
- 2018: Return to Mind (Edition), with Eyolf Dale Wolf Valley
- 2018: Multiverse (Pling Music), with Anders Lønne Grønseth
- 2019: Continuum (AMP), with Bridges
- 2019: Owerset (Dell Daisy Records), with Sarah-Jane Summers
- 2019: Theory of Anything (Pling Music), with Anders Lønne Grønseth Multiverse
- 2019: Fange av min tid (Grappa), with Jo Skaansar
- 2019: Strange Days (Whirlwind), with Natacha Atlas
- 2020: Håpets kappe (KKV), with Solfrid Molland
- 2020: Outer View (NXN), with Anders Lønne Grønseth Multiverse
- 2020: Inner View (NXN), with Anders Lønne Grønseth Multiverse
- 2023: Water Fabric (ODIN), with Espen Berg
