= Erik Nylander =

Swedish jazz drummer and composer (born 1981)

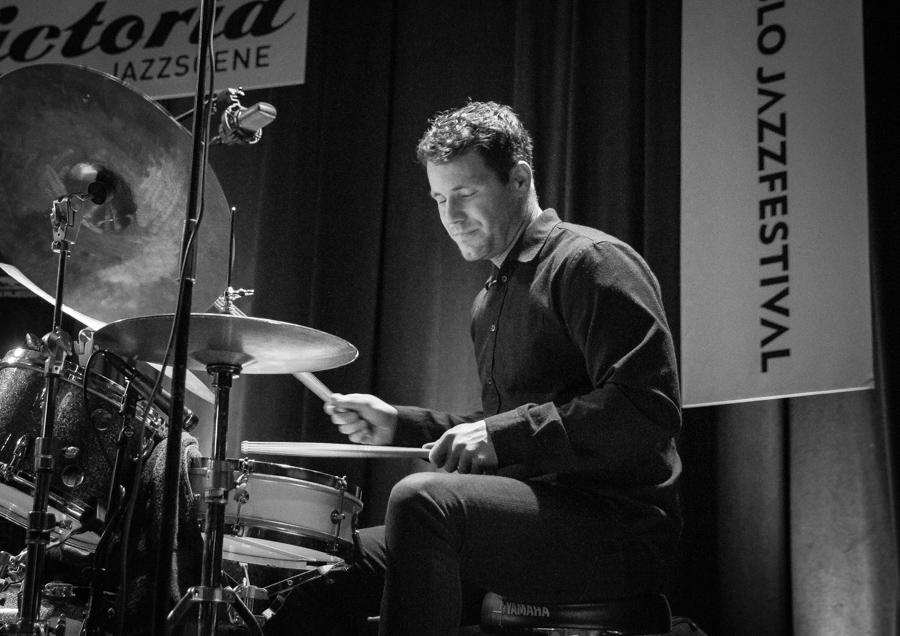
- Nylander at Oslo Jazzfestival 2017

Background information
- Born: Johan Erik Nylander; 3 April 1981 (age 45); Norberg, Sweden
- Origin: Sweden
- Genres: Jazz
- Occupations: Musician and composer
- Instrument: Drums
- Labels: Parallell, Jazzland [sic]

Johan Erik Nylander (born 3 April 1981 in Norberg, Sweden) is a Swedish jazz musician (drums), improviser and composer, working in Norway since 2002. He plays in several bands, among them Ola Kvernberg Trio, "Kobert", Kirsti Huke Quartet, Tore Brunborg Trio, "Liarbird", Bjørn Alterhaug Quintet, "Peloton", Juxtaposed, Magic Pocket, "Monoswezi", and his own Erik Nylanders Orkester.

== Career ==
After completing high school at Domarhagsskolan, Nylander studied on the Jazz program at Trondheim Musikkonservatorium (2002–04). He fold recognition on the Norwegian and Nordic jazz scenes within various projects and contributed on a number of releases, among them the album Corrupted Mirror (2009), in a meeting with Karl Stømme (trumpet) and Steinar Nickelsen (keyboard). The album took shape in the studio where the musicians met without any specific intention to record an album. The idea was to use the three instruments in interaction playing all kinds of music, coming naturally in the moment. The recordings were made in three different sessions. Most of the tracks are improvised on the spot, but also includes compositions written by Strømme and Nickelsen. The Oberheim OB-X synthesizer from 1980 was crucial for the album soundscape.

In 2005, Nylander performed at the international Jazz festival Nattjazz in Bergen, Norway, with Marita Røstad & "Velvet City". The album A festa Vale Tudo (2009) within his Erik Nylanders Orchestra (including Eivind Lønning, Espen Reinertsen, Hanna Gjermundrød, Ole Morten Vågan and Petter Vågan) marked Nylander's debut as a record producer and band leader. He has also collaboratively initiated several other band projects.

== Discography ==
=== As band leader ===
- 2009: A festa Vale Tudo (Parallell), within Erik Nylanders Orkester

=== Collaborative works ===
Within Ola Kvernberg Trio

- 2004: Night driver (Jazzland Recordings), performing Nylanders own compositions
- 2009: Folk (Jazzland)

Within Kobert

- 2006: Glowing (NorCD)
- 2009: Trondheim Jazz Orchestra and Kobert (MNJ Records), fra at Moldejazz 2008

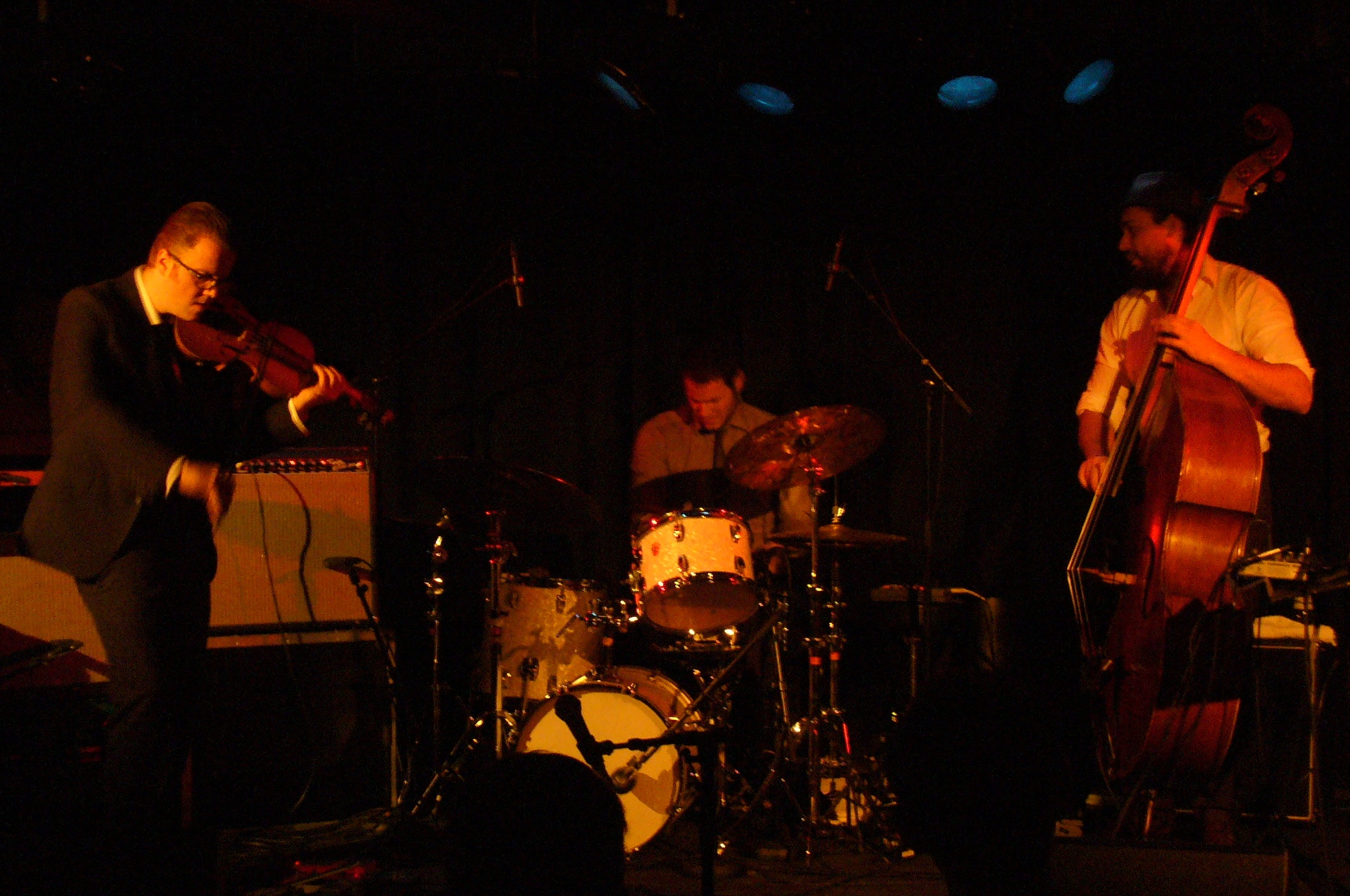
Ola Kvernberg, Erik Nylander and Steinar Raknes with the Jazzland Community at the Jazz club Sardinen, USF Verftet in November 2012.

- 2009: Invasion of Privacy (Impeller Recordings)
- 2011: Off The Hook (Øra Fonogram)

Within The Espen Reinertsen Organic Jukebox

- 2007: Subaquatic Disco (Aim Records)

Within Peloton

- 2007: Selected Recordings (Parallell)
- 2011: The Early Years (Parallell)

Within Bjørn Alterhaug Quintet

- 2009: Songlines (Ponca Jazz)

With Steinar Nickelsen and Karl Strømme

- 2009: Corrupted Mirror (Parallell)

Within Magic Pocket

- 2011: The Katabatic Wind (Bolage), featuring Morten Qvenild
- 2011: Kinetic Music (MNJ Records), with Trondheim Jazz Orchestra, fra Moldejazz 2010

Within Liarbird

- 2011: Liarbird (Bolage)

Within Monkeybar (duo with Steinar Nickelsen)

- 2012: Dear You (Parallell)

Within the trio Kirsti, Ola and Erik

- 2015: Rags & Silk (Name Music & Publishing)
