= Fredrik Wallumrød =

Norwegian jazz drummer and composer (born 1973)

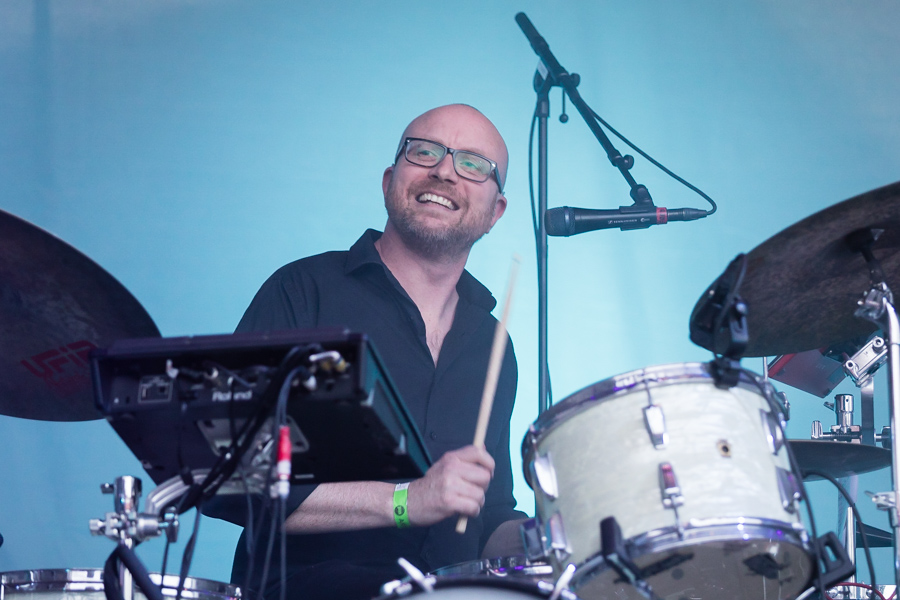
- Kongsberg Jazz festival, 2019

Background information
- Born: 21 September 1973 (age 52); Kongsberg, Buskerud
- Origin: Norway
- Genres: Jazz
- Occupations: Musician, composer
- Instrument: Drums

Fredrik Wallumrød (born 21 September 1973 in Kongsberg, Norway) is a Norwegian drummer and composer, known for his collaborations with musicians like Karl Seglem, Trygve Seim, Solveig Slettahjell, Jarle Bernhoft, Lene Marlin, Maria Mena, and the band Span. He is the younger brother of the pianist Christian Wallumrød, older brother of the singer Susanna Wallumrød, and cousin to the pianist David Wallumrød.

== Career ==
Wallumrød is educated at the Jazz Program at Trondheim Musikkonservatorium (1992). He started the Funk jazz electronica band Squid, together with bassist Vemund Stavnes. The two of them later joined the rock band Span replacing Rouge (Roger Zernichow-Brekke) på bass og Rage V (Vegard Eriksfallet) på trommer. Here the collaboration with vocalist Burn (Jarle Bernhoft) started.

Now he also plays within the metal band "Dog Almighty" together with Fridtjof "Joff" Nilsen and Kim Nordbæk, and the rock band "El Caco" including Anders Gjesti (guitar) and Øyvind Osa (bass guitar).

== Discography ==
Within Squid, together with Vemund Stavnes

- 1998 Super (Forward Records), (including Trygve Seim and Solveig Slettahjell)

With Karl Seglem

- 2002: Nye Nord (NorCD)

Within Vintermåne

- 2002: Vintermåne (2L)

Within Span

- 2003: Mass Distraction (Island Records)
- 2005: Vs. Time (Johnny Nowhere / Mercury)

With Maria Mena

- 2004: You're the Only One (Columbia)
- 2004: Mellow (Columbia)

With Lene Marlin

- 2005: Lost in a Moment (Virgin)

With Susanna and the Magical Orchestra

- 2009: Susanna and the Magical Orchestra – 3 (Rune Grammofon)

Within Container

- 2011: Container (Toothfairy)

With El Caco

- 2009 Heat
- 2012 Hatred, Love and Diagrams
- 2016 7
- 2023 Uncelebration
