= Union Rhythm Kings =

- Origin: Stockholm, Sweden
- Genres: New Orleans jazz
- Years active: 2007–present
- Labels: Herman Records
- Members: Bent Persson; Lars Frank; Kristoffer Kompen; Jacob Ullberger; Frans Sjöström; Morten Gunnar Larsen
- Website: Union Rhythm Kings on Myspace

Union Rhythm Kings (established 2007 in Stockholm, Sweden) is a Norwegian - Swedish sextet performing traditional New Orleans jazz. The band was founded by the trombonist Kristoffer Kompen.

== Biography ==
Union Rhythm Kings have undertaken several tours in Norway and Sweden since 2008, where they played in various jazz clubs, concert halls, cultural and jazz festivals such as the Oslo Jazzfestival, the Trondheim Jazz Festival, Gothenburg Jazz Festival, Moldejazz and the Classic Jazzparty in Newcastle.

The band is a combination of Swedish and Norwegian musicians of two generations, which has developed a genuine interest in the traditional New Orleans jazz from the 1920s and 1930s.

== Personnel ==
- Bent Persson (Sweden), trumpet
- Lars Frank (Norway) - clarinet & saxophone
- Kristoffer Kompen (Norway) - trombone
- Jacob Ullberger (Sweden) - banjo & guitar
- Frans Sjöström (Sweden) - bass sax
- Morten Gunnar Larsen (Norway) - piano

== Discography ==
- 2008: A Hot Reunion! (Herman Records)
- 2015: Second Reunion
