= Pandijazz =

Venezuelan youth jazz band

Members of Pandijazz rehearsing, November 2016.

Pandijazz, also known as Los Pequeños Gigantes del Jazz, was founded in 2010 in Barquisimeto, Lara State. It is the only all youth jazz band in Venezuela. The school has about 20 members in the band, all between the ages of 6 and 16 years old.

== Biography ==
Pandijazz was founded by Norbelis Lameda. Currently, the President of Pandijazz is Mrs. Darisol Hernandez Rojas. The current Musical Director is Fausto Castillo Paradas. The group was started by the city of Barquisimeto, which decided to form the jazz group oriented towards children. The young band members are noted for their profound interest for jazz. Their appearance at the fifth edition of Festival Internacional de Jazz en Barquisimeto, brought considerable attention to the project. The President of the Festival Internacional de Jazz en Barquisimeto, Ms. Zuly Perdomo, encouraged the kids to develop a repertoire of compositions by Duke Ellington, Thelonious Monk, Antônio Carlos Jobim and others.

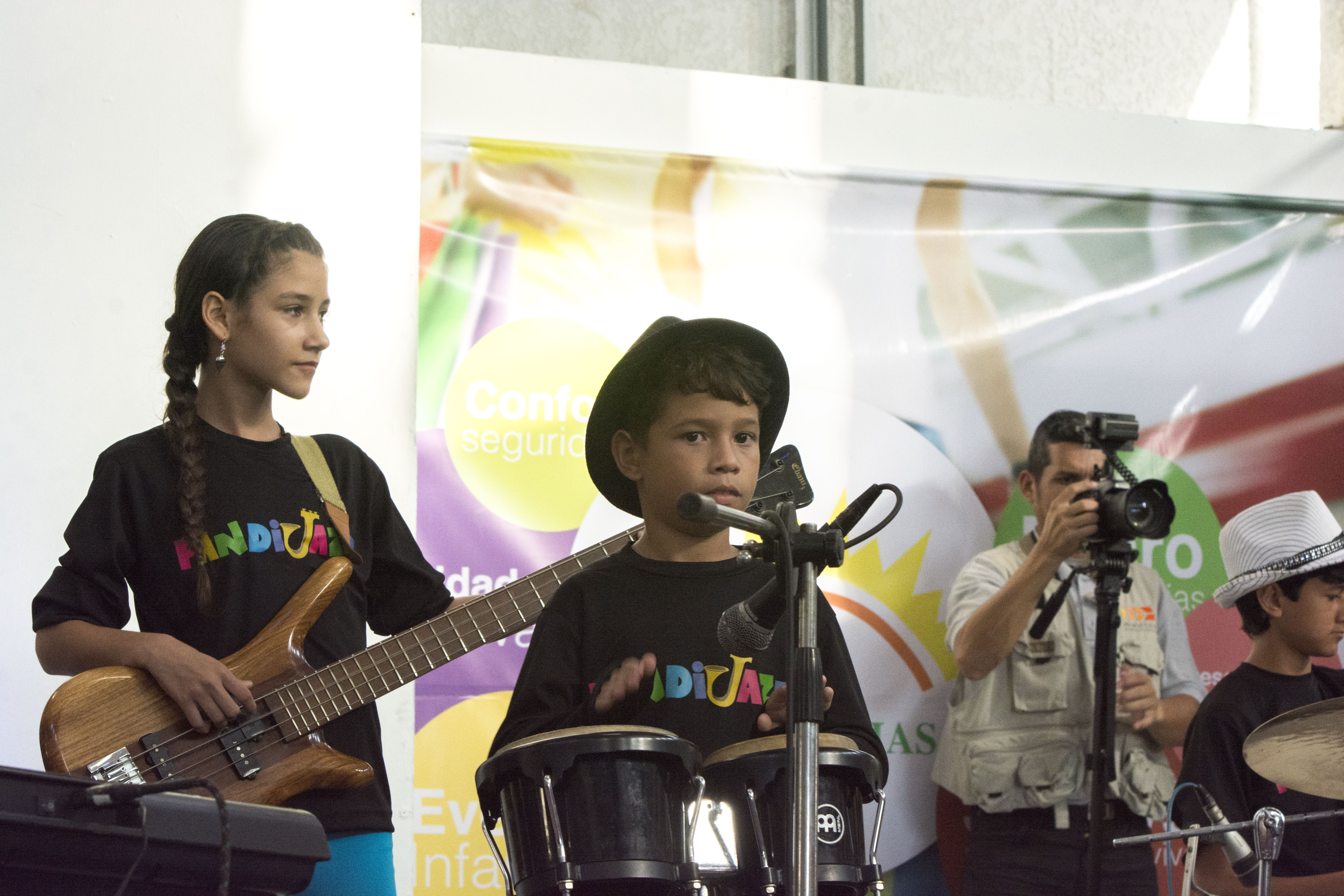
Members playing.

The band has become very popular, and have performed at concerts. They are presented every year at the Festival Internacional de Jazz en Barquisimeto. They also offer educational activities for kids. The band opened the concert of Linda Briceño at the jazz festival PDVSA STAY (PDVSA La Estancia) in Caracas, and, in 2015, they were the only children’s group selected for a workshop with Wynton Marsalis and the Lincoln Center Orchestra. The group also appeared at Merida Jazz Festival.

In 2017 and 2018, Pandijazz went to Oslo, Norway and participated in concerts and at the International Jazz Festivals. The norwegian director of Barnas Jazzhus, Odd André Elveland, had invited 3 girls of Pandijazz. Those three girls being María Estefany Ortega Santa Marta, Gabriela Rengifo Aponte, and Niccole Meza Ramos.
