= Ellen Brekken =

Norwegian jazz musician

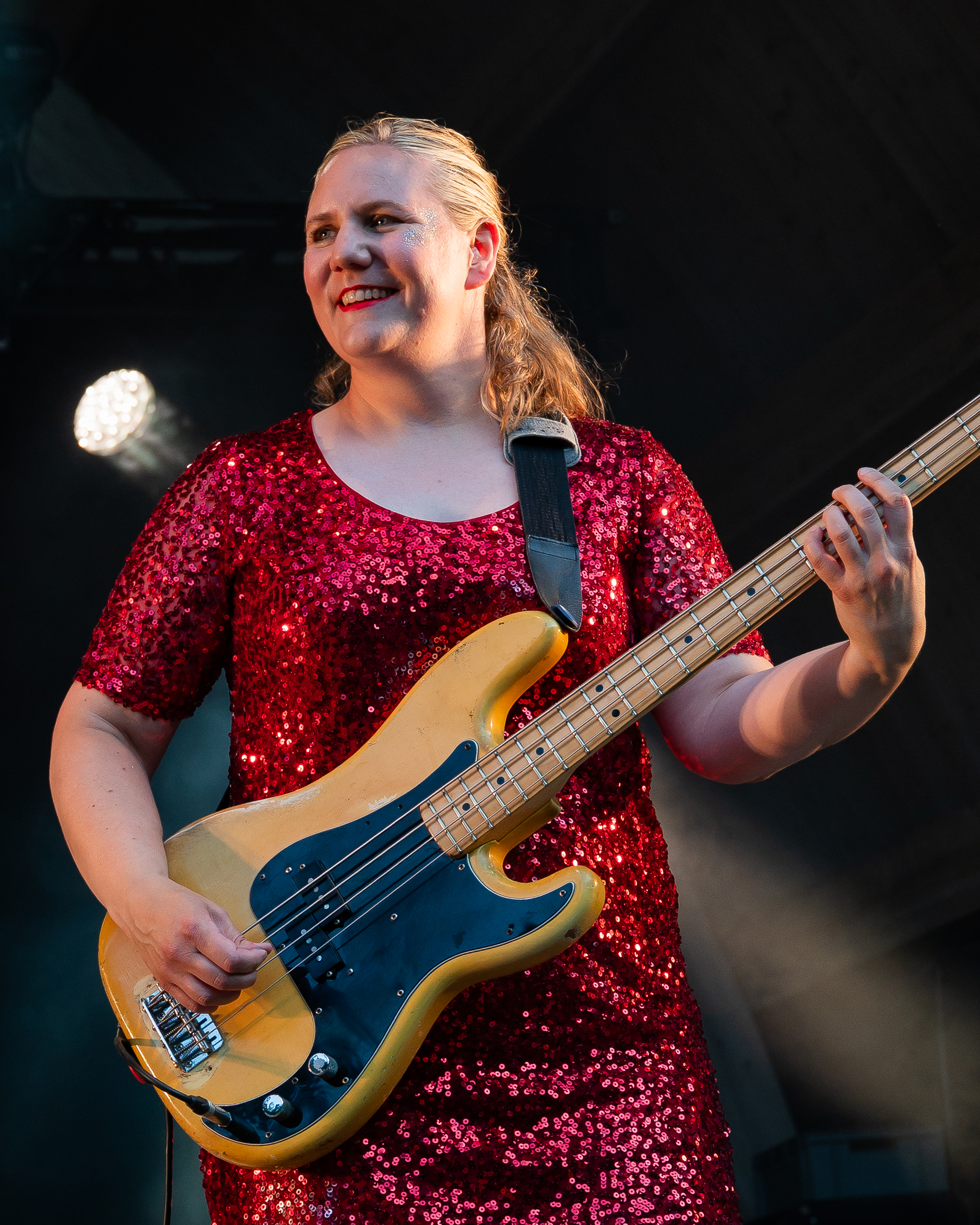
- With Hedvig Mollestad Trio, 2025

Background information
- Born: 20 June 1985 (age 40); Tynset, Hedmark, Norway
- Genres: Jazz, pop, rock, folk
- Occupations: Musician, composer
- Instruments: Double bass, bass guitar, tuba, backing vocals
- Years active: 2000–present
- Labels: Rune Grammofon, ta:lik

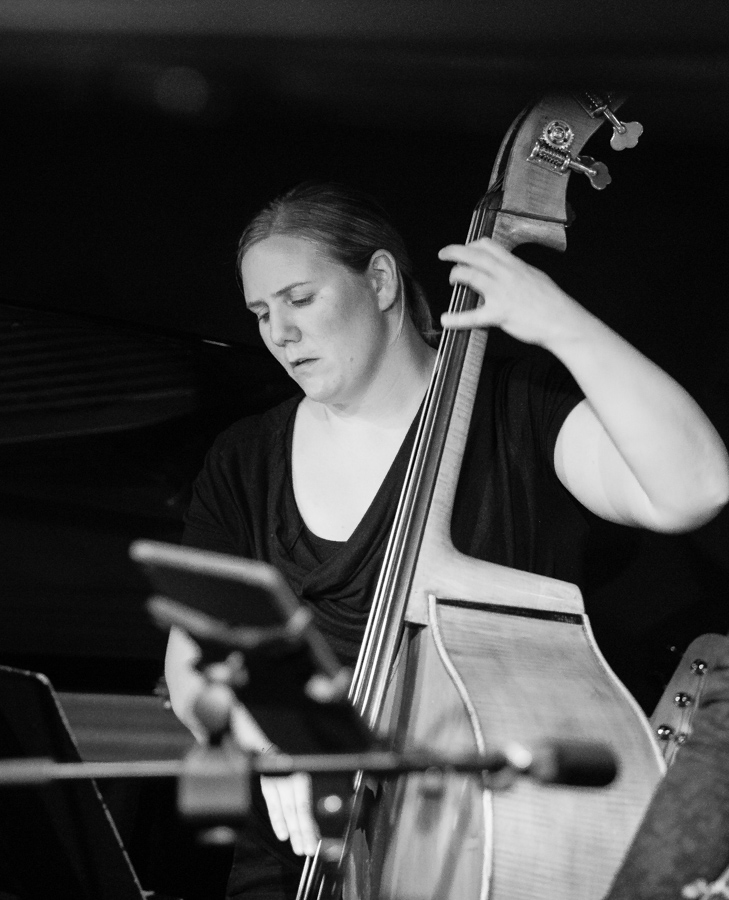
Ellen Brekken performing in 2019

Ellen Brekken (born 1985) is a Norwegian jazz musician who plays upright bass, bass guitar, and the tuba. She is also a composer.

== Biography ==
Brekken was born in Tynset Municipality, Norway. She attended the Toneheim Folk High School in 2005, and completed a bachelor's degree in Improvised Music on the jazz program at the Norwegian Academy of Music in Oslo from 2006 to 2010, including a period of exchange studies in Cape Town, South Africa.

Brekken is a member of the Hedvig Mollestad Trio including Ivar Loe Bjørnstad. For the albums All of them witches (2013) and Ding dong. You're dead. (2021) they were nominated to the Norwegian version of a Grammy award, Spellemannprisen, in the rock category.

In 2021, she released the first album under her own name, Ambush, with her quartet A tonic for the troops. Alongside Brekken, the band consists of Espen Berg (piano), Magnus Bakken (saxophones), and Magnus Sefaniassen Eide (drums). They released their second album, Realm of Opportunities, in 2023.

Ellen Brekken Quartet, including Dag-Filip Roaldsnes (piano), Eskil Sæter (guitar) and Jon Audun Baar (drums), did several gigs during the 2010s. Her band Du og jeg og vi 2–3–4 (translated: "You and I, just we 2–3–4", a wordplay on a wellknown Norwegian children's song and the count-in for a song) plays music for kids.

With the band MAAR she plays Norwegian folk music. They were nominated for Folkelarmprisen for their album Vrangsvevd (2014). She and Lars Jakob Rudjord lead a 7-piece folk/jazz big band called Gruvar. The band plays newly composed music by Brekken and Rudjord, aiming to build bridges between folk and jazz music.

She has been working regularly for Concerts Norway, different theatres in Norway (Nationaltheatret, Folketeatret, Oslo Nye Teater, Trøndelag Teater), in addition to playing with musicians such as Tord Gustavsen, Espen Rud, Staffan William-Olsson, Ketil Bjørnstad, Karl Seglem, Frode Nymo, Bugge Wesseltoft, Frode Alnæs, Jens Wendelboe, Aasmund Nordstoga, and Ine Hoem. She has also been a member of Caledonia Jazzband.

== Discography ==
=== With A tonic for the troops ===
- 2021: Ambush (ODIN)
- 2023: Realm of Opportunities (ODIN)

=== Within Hedvig Mollestad Trio including with Ivar Loe Bjørnstad ===
- 2011: Shoot! (Rune Grammofon)
- 2013: All of Them Witches (Rune Grammofon)
- 2014: Enfant Terrible! (Rune Grammofon)
- 2016: Black Stabat Mater (Rune Grammofon)
- 2016: Evil In Oslo (Rune Grammofon)
- 2018: Smells Funny (Rune Grammofon)
- 2021: Ding dong. You're dead. (Rune Grammofon)
- 2022: Maternity Beat – Hedvig Mollestad og Trondheim jazzorkester (Rune Grammofon)
- 2025: Bees in the Bonnet (Rune Grammofon)

=== With Du og jeg og vi 2–3–4 ===
- 2017: Krokodille i baksetet – Du og jeg og vi 2–3–4 (Curling Legs)
- 2021: Balkongfest – Du og jeg og vi 2–3–4 (Du og jeg records)

=== Within MAAR ===
- 2014: Vrangsvevd (ta:lik)
- 2015: Epleslang (ta:lik)

=== Other ===
- 2012: Crazy Heart (EP) – Sigrun and the Kitchen Band (HummingBird records)
- 2013: Uten at du vet det – Sigrun Loe Sparboe (Tylden & Co AS)
- 2013: Av en sliters memoarer – Erik Lukashaugen (Øksekar)
- 2013: The Island (EP) – Ine Hoem (Impeller recordings)
- 2014: Mapping the coincidence (EP) – Lise Hvoslef (Lise Hvoslef Records)
- 2015: Tel si ega tid – Erik Lukashaugen (Øksekar)
- 2015: Ein song til deg – Kjetil Flatland (Grappa musikkforlag)
- 2016: Finnskogvegen – Erik Lukashaugen (Øksekar)
- 2016: Just Being Part – Lise Hvoslef (Lise Hvoslef recordings)
- 2016: Syng min sorg, gråt min glede – Bjørn Anders Hermundstad (Kirkelig kulturverksted)
- 2016: Stifinner – Tone Hulbækmo (Heilo)
- 2017: Hyttetankar – Kjetil Flatland (Grappa musikkforlag)
- 2017: Out of silence – FriEnsemblet (Giraffa records)
- 2017: Tanken er fri – Trond Granlund (Trond Granlund records)
- 2017: Appily Ever After – Ava Freddy (Pretty young things)
- 2017: Hildersyn – Irene Tillung (Heilo)
- 2021: New constellations – Falkevik (Drabant)
- 2022: En egen ro – Lise Hvoslef (Lise Hvoslef records)
- 2022: Kyrkja – Carl Petter Opsahl (Visions and dreams)
- 2023: Når timen er blå – Kjetil Flatland (Cracker factory music)
- 2023: Min lille by – Hilde Brunsvik (Park Grammofon)
- 2023: Denna tida i fjor – Moddi (Propeller)
- 2024: Jag etter vind – Ketil Bjørnstad (Simax classic)
- 2024: Myth, path, hope – Karl Seglem (NorCD)
