= Improbasen =

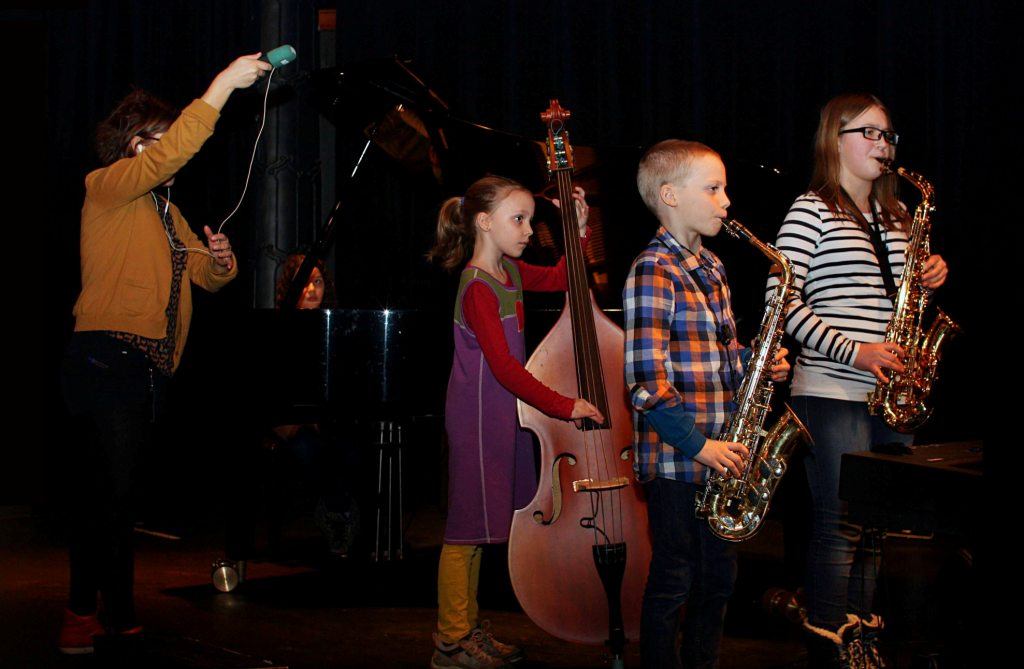
Children from Improbasen in Norway making radio documentary in February 2014

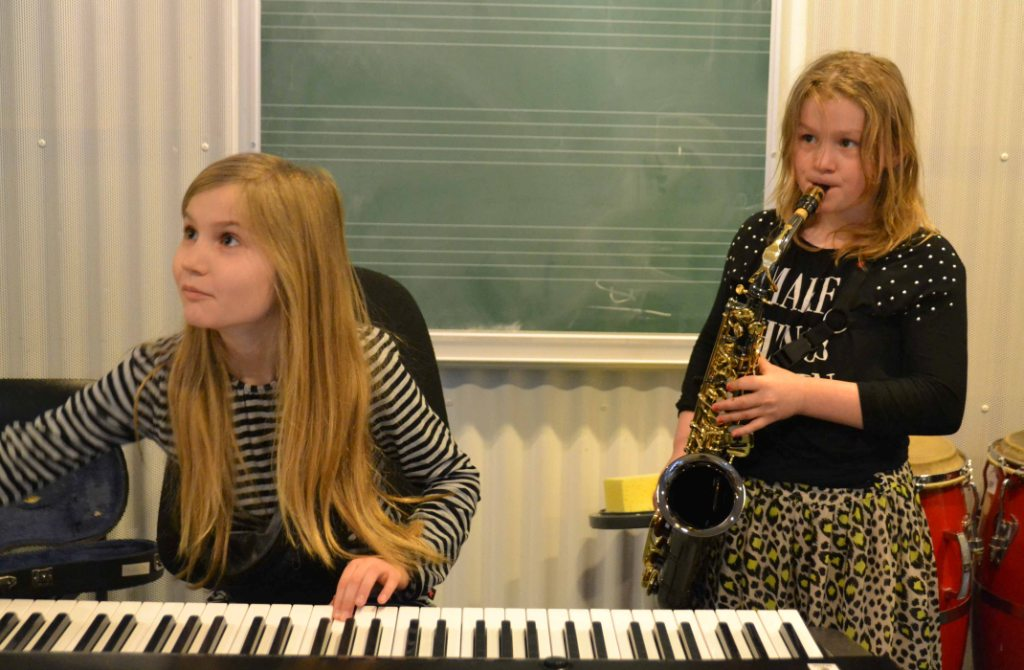
Children playing experimental jazz during nationwide workshop in Denmark in February 2014

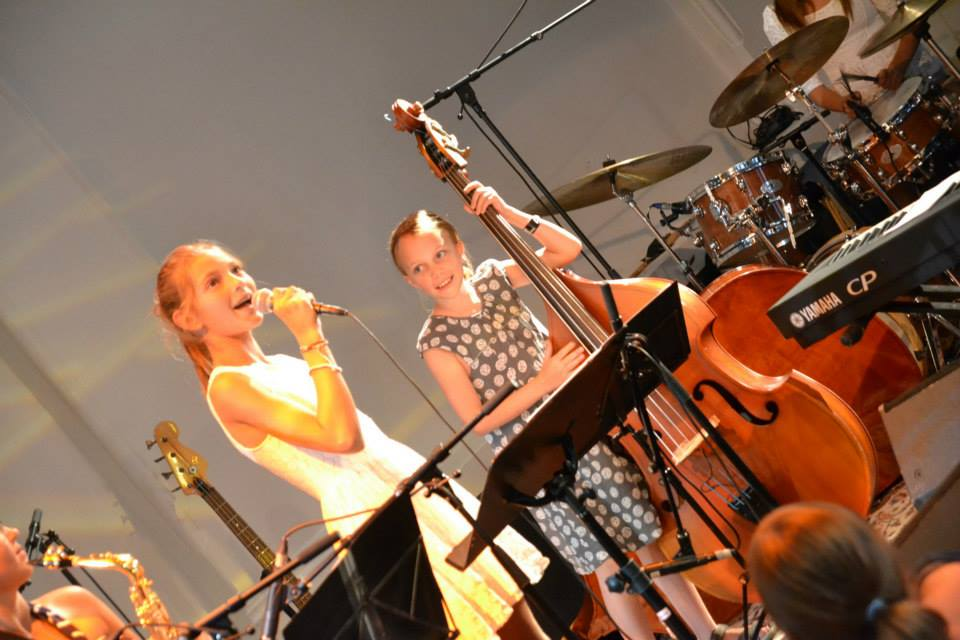
Children performing at the international festival Kids in Jazz, in Oslo, August 2014

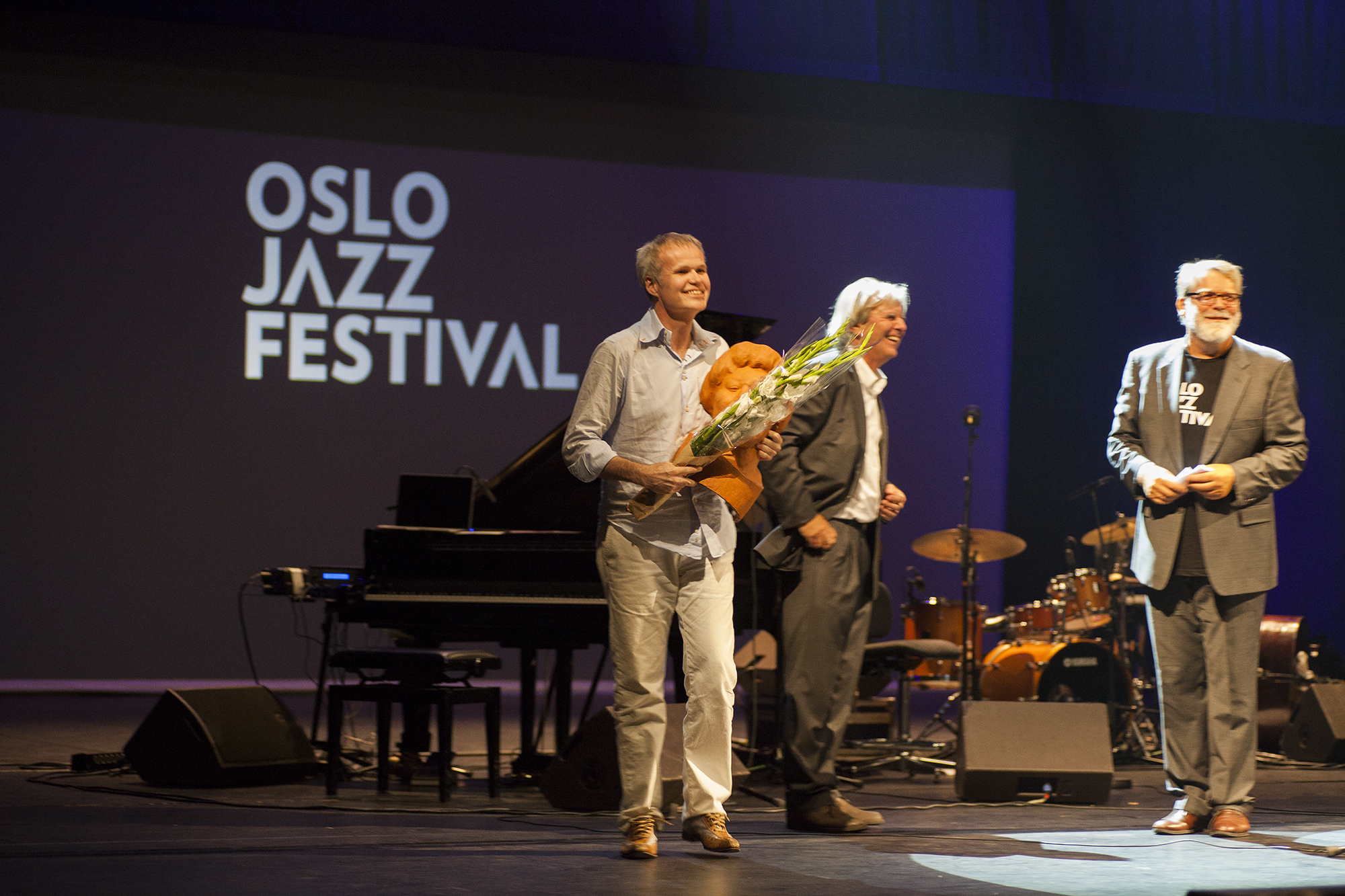
Founder of Improbasen receives the award Ella-prisen 2014, for his work with children and jazz.

Improbasen is a nationwide center in Norway, where children learn to play jazz.

== Biography ==
Improbasens methods for teaching even small children to play complex music, has attracted attention all over Norway and abroad. Since 2008, some of the most progressive jazz musicians in Norway, including Thomas Strønen, Ole Morten Vågan, Hedvig Mollestad Thomassen, Mats Eilertsen, Hanna Paulsberg and Tore Brunborg, have conducted workshops at the center.

== Projects ==
Improbasen has engaged in comprehensive educational projects in Norway, Sweden, Denmark, Iceland, Faroe Islands, Italy, Switzerland, Austria and Japan.

The center also helped develop the jazz club Barnas Jazzhus, and the international festival Kids in Jazz. In August 2014, the founder of Improbasen, Odd André Elveland, received the award Ella-prisen for his work with children and jazz.

== TV ==
Improbasen Det kan føles som man skal hoppe fra 10-metern,NRK (2024)

== Reports from another countries ==
Barnadjazz í Mosó 2023 - Visited to the President of Iceland's house, Forseti ísland-2023-6-22(Iceland)

Barnadjazz í Mosó 2023 - Vísir TV program-2023-6-23(Iceland)

Barnadjazz í Mosó 2023 -Article, Stelpur spiluðu djass í Mosó, mbi.is -2023-6-23(Iceland)

Barnadjazz í Mosó 2024 - Visit to the Norges ambassade i Reykjavik and Play in there.-2024-6-21(Iceland)

Barnadjazz í Mosó 2024 in Iceland-Archived Tónlistarskóli Ísafjarðar2024-6-23 (Iceland)

Sapporo Junior Jazz School Official Report『サッポロ・サウンド・スクエアVol.6』-2025-01-18(Sapporo,Japan)

Sapporo Junior Jazz School Official Report-2025年1月19日ー『Improbasen交流会』-2025-01-19(Sapporo,Japan)
