= Wallumrød =

Wallumrød is a surname. Notable people with the surname include:

- Christian Wallumrød (born 1971), Norwegian jazz musician and composer
- David Wallumrød (born 1977), Norwegian pianist
- Fredrik Wallumrød (born 1973), Norwegian drummer and composer
- Susanna Wallumrød (born 1979), Norwegian vocalist
