= I Swung the Election =

Single by Jack Teagarden and His Orchestra
- B-side: "Aunt Hagar's Blues"
- Released: 1939
- Recorded: July 19, 1939
- Genre: Jazz
- Length: 2:36
- Label: Columbia Records
- Songwriter: Glenn Miller

"I Swung the Election" is a 1939 song composed by Glenn Miller and recorded by jazz trombonist Jack Teagarden and his orchestra. Jack Teagarden released the song as a Columbia 78 single in 1939 and as a V-Disc in 1948.

== Overview ==
Glenn Miller is credited with writing the song "I Swung the Election" which was recorded by Jack Teagarden in 1939.

Jack Teagarden recorded the song on July 19, 1939 in New York and released it as an A side 78 single as Columbia 35206A b/w "Aunt Hagar's Blues" and as a V-Disc, No. 823B, J1676, Swing, "XX" Release, issued in January, 1948, with the composer on the label listed as "Glenn Miller". Teagarden sang and played the trombone on the recording.

V-Disc 823B, Jack Teagarden and Band, 1948.

The V Disc version was recorded in Los Angeles on August 24, 1944. The personnel on the session were: Jack Teagarden tb, v, dir / Clair Jones, Bob McLaughlin, Val Salata, Vernon 'Tex' Williams t / Fred Keller, Ray Olsen, Wally Wells tb / Vic Rosi cl, as / Dale Stoddard as / Howard 'Gish' Gilbertson, Ken Harpster ts / Clark Crandall bar / Don Seidel p / Jimmy Lynch sb / Frank Harrington d.

The recording was featured on the soundtrack to the 1993 documentary film The War Room starring James Carville and George Stephanopoulos on the 1992 presidential election when it was played over the closing credits.

The song also appears on:

- 2010 Wnts compilation Jack Teagarden: Love Me
- 2009 Chacra Music album Jack Teagarden: The Classic Years, Vol. 2
- 2004 Avid collection Jack Teagarden: Father of Jazz Trombone
- Grammercy album Big Band Jazz
- Lost Gold Records collection Jack Teagarden: V-Disc: World War 2 Recordings
- 1998 Saar compilation Stars Fell on Alabama: 1931-1940
- 1993 Classics album Jack Teagarden and His Orchestra, 1934-1939

The song was recorded in 2012 by Nina Persson with The Citizens Band, a political cabaret troupe, and was featured on the album Grab A Root and Growl.

An instrumental recording was released in 2013 by Kristoffer Kompen on the album A Tribute to Jack Teagarden.

== Sources ==
- Flower, John (1972). Moonlight Serenade: A Bio-discography of the Glenn Miller Civilian Band. New Rochelle, NY: Arlington House. ISBN 0-87000-161-2.
- Miller, Glenn (1943). Glenn Miller's Method for Orchestral Arranging. New York: Mutual Music Society. ASIN: B0007DMEDQ
- Simon, George Thomas (1980). Glenn Miller and His Orchestra. New York: Da Capo paperback. ISBN 0-306-80129-9.
- Simon, George Thomas (1971). Simon Says: The Sights and Sounds of the Swing Era, 1935-1955. New York: Galahad. ISBN 0-88365-001-0.
- Schuller, Gunther (1991). The Swing Era: The Development of Jazz, 1930–1945. Volume 2. New York: Oxford University Press. ISBN 0-19-507140-9.
