= Oslo Jazzfestival =

Norwegian music event

Oslo International Jazz Festival Oslo Jazzfestival
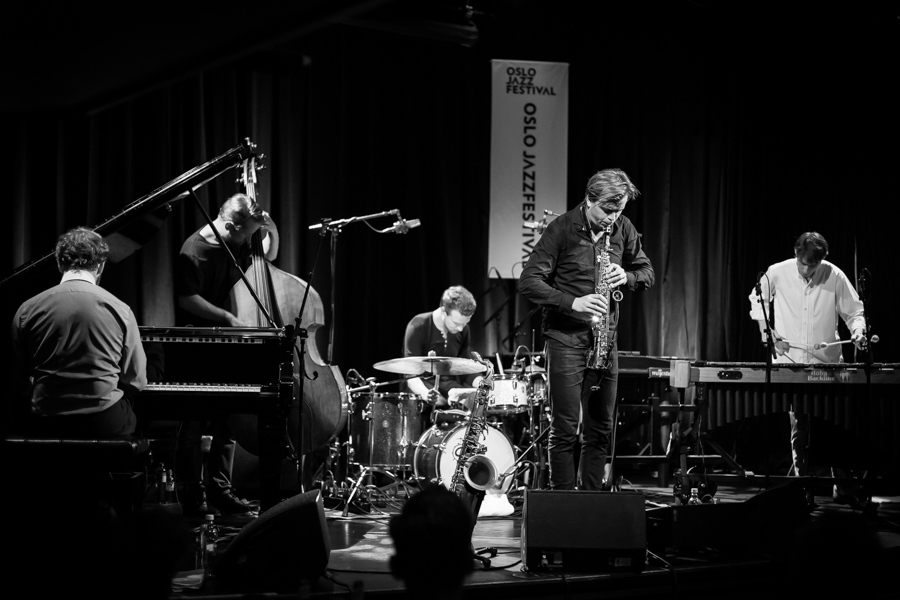
- Marius Neset at Oslo Jazzfestival in 2015
- Status: Active
- Genre: Jazz Festival
- Date: Mid August
- Begins: 11 August 2019
- Ends: 17 August 2019
- Frequency: Annually
- Location: Oslo
- Country: Norway
- Years active: 1986 – present
- Inaugurated: Founded 1985
- Website: www.oslojazz.no

Oslo International Jazz Festival (Oslo Jazzfestival, established 1986 in Norway) is a Norwegian music event, held in August, with a focus on music from the jazz genre, performed on stages in Oslo.

== History ==
The pilot project (1984–1985) was initiated by Aage Teigen. The first festival in 1986, had more than forty volunteers and the event received 350 000 Norwegian kroner in donations from Oslo Municipality. The music was largely traditional jazz, Dixieland, New Orleans jazz, etc. The organization became a Foundation in 1995, led by Truls Helweg, chairman of the board since 1995) and permanently appointed General Manager (Aage Teigen), at a time when the budget was over 5 million Norwegian kroner. Teigen was in 2002 awarded the Oslo City Artist Award for his commitment.

In 2006, the festival held 70 concerts (of these 15 free) with 450 musicians on 18 stages with around 70,000 spectators. Aage Teigen was then general manager with more than 200 volunteers, and the music includes all genres of jazz. The new leader from 2007 was Edvard Askeland.

At the festival in August 2013, Nora Brockstedt was honored by a grand concert, where Come Shine and saxophonist Hanna Paulsberg presented highlights from Brockstedts repertoire in "brilliant versions".

== Ella-prisen ==
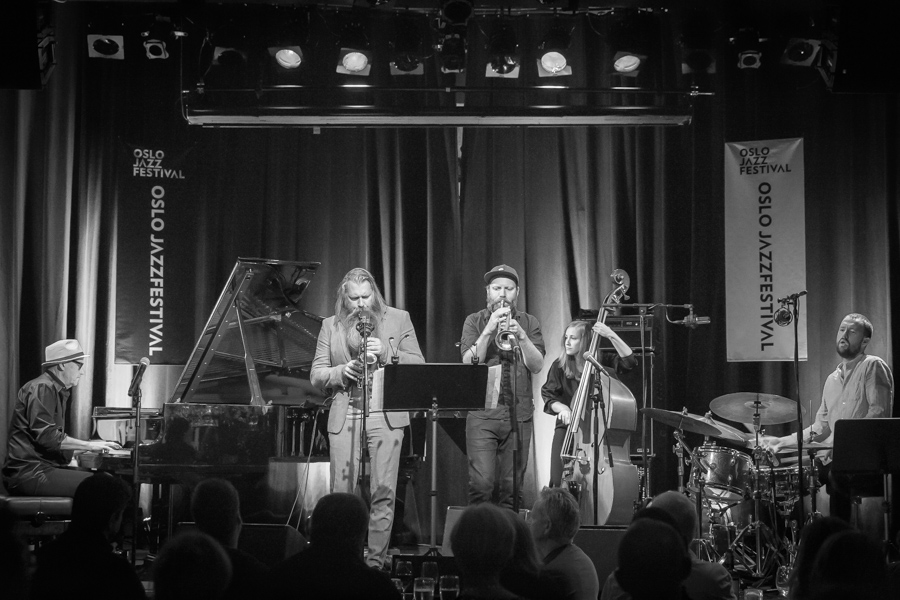
The Oslo Jazz Festival Orchestra 2016 at Victoria Teater. At stage, Mathias Eick (trumpet), Trygve Seim (saxophone), Jon Balke (piano), Ellen Andrea Wang (double bass) and Gard Nilssen (drums).

A sculpture of Ella Fitzgerald is awarded a person who has developed the festival and the Oslo Jazz Scene, created by the artist Mariann Hazeland.

The prize was first awarded in 1995

- 1995: Randi Hultin journalist based in Oslo.

Later winners are

- 1996: Stein Kagge, journalist based in Oslo
- 1997: Totti Bergh, saxophonist based in Oslo
- 1998: Kristian Ystehede, multiinstrumentalist
- 1999: Laila Dalseth, vocalist resided in Oslo
- 2000: Tore Jensen, trumpeter in Oslo (2000),
- 2001: Miloud Guiderk, musician and impresario
- 2002: Eivind Solberg, trumpeter resided in Oslo
- 2003: Roald Helgheim, journalist
- 2004: Gerhard Aspheim, trombonist resided in Oslo
- 2005: Peter T. Malling, businessman and founder of «Jazzradioen»
- 2006: Hank O'Neal, record producer, photographer and journalist from USA
- 2007: Bjørn Petersen, leader of Gemini Records in Oslo
- 2008: Karin Krog, vocalist from Oslo
- 2009: Bodil Niska, saxophonist and jazz entrepreneur
- 2010: Arild Andersen, bassist from Oslo
- 2011: Aage Teigen, trombonist and founder of Oslo Jazz Festival (2011)
- 2012: Bugge Wesseltoft, pianist, composer, producer and owner of Jazzland Recordings
- 2013: Erlend Skomsvoll, pianist, composer and orchestra leader
- 2014: Odd André Elveland, as the founder of Improbasen and Kids in Jazz
- 2015: Espen Nilsen, manager of the jazz venue "Herr Nilsen" in Oslo
- 2016: John Trehjørningen, jazz enthusiast and active at the Oslo Jazzfestival
- 2017: Bjørn Stendahl, jazz historian
- 2018: Jon Christensen, jazz drummer
- 2019: Paolo Vinaccia, drummer
- 2020: Hanna Paulsberg, saxophonist
- 2021: Kristoffer Kompen, trombonist

== Usbl Jazztalent award ==
Prize awarded to a young jazz musician annually at Oslo Jazzfestival since 2019. The prize is funded by Boligbyggelaget Usbl and consists of NOK. 30,000, -, in addition to a concert during the subsequent Oslo Jazz Festival. The prize was awarded for the first time at the Oslo Jazz Festival's opening concert on 11 August 2019 in the Norwegian Opera & Ballet by Usbl director Johan Bruun to musician Daniela Reyes Holmsen.

- 2019 Daniela Reyes Holmsen
- 2020 Veslemøy Narvesen
- 2021 Ola Erlien

== Statkraft's Young Star Grant ==
Scholarship which was awarded to a musician or a band (age 18–25) which has been noticed on local, regional and / or national level. The grant supported by Statkraft provides 50,000 Norwegian kroner and included a gig with an optional project during the subsequent festival., in the period between 2007 and 2013.

- 2007: Marianne Halmrast
- 2008: Jørgen Mathisen
- 2009: Guro Skumsnes Moe
- 2010: Kristoffer Kompen
- 2011: Anja Lauvdal
- 2012: Ellen Andrea Wang
- 2013: Ingrid Søfteland Neset
