= Dog Almighty =

Norwegian rock band

Dog Almighty was a Norwegian rock band consisting of Fridtjof Nilsen, Kim Nordbæk and Fredrik Wallumrød, which started in January 2006. It was formed from the bands Span and Farout Fishing, partially influenced by Jarle Bernhoft leaving Span to go solo. Their debut album, Dog Almighty featured Sindri as singer and front man, and got mixed reviews.

Debut plata ble først lansert på Universal Islands og i 2009 av Stunted Records.

== Discography ==
- 2007 Dog Almighty (album)
