= David Arthur Skinner =

British Jazz pianist

David Arthur Skinner (born 3 January 1980) is a British pianist, bandleader, and composer. Skinner was born on the Isle of Wight.

== Discography ==
=== Solo albums ===
- 2013: Diagonal Jazz (Pling Music), solo piano
- 2015: Cubistic Boogie (Losen Records), solo piano
- 2017: Skinner plays Skinner (Losen Records), solo piano

=== Collaborations ===
Within Sphinx

- 1999: Sphinx
- 2001: Speaks the Riddle of the Undisputed Truth (Acoustica)
- 2003: Live at Cloitre des Carmes, Avignon
- 2006: Brutte Traader – Poems of Bjarne Andreassen (Japanese release)
- 2007: Bohemian Sketches (Aim Records)
- 2011: Harmonogram (Pling Music)

With The Heavy Horns

- 2003: Mine's Bigger Than Yours

With Laura Fowles

- 2003: David Skinner and Laura Fowles Duo (Yorkshire Arts Council)

Within Øyvind Gravdal Band

- 2005 In The Tree (Ponca Jazz)

With Anders Lønne Grønseth

- 2006: Phantasmagoria (Aim Records)
- 2009: Arc en ciel (Pling Music)
- 2013: At Swing Audio (Pling Music)

With Kristoffer Kompen

- 2013: A Tribute to Jack Teagarden (Herman Records)
