= 1:Man 2:Band =

Live album by Jarle Bernhoft
- Released: 11 December 2010
- Recorded: 11 January 2009
- Genre: Soul, Jazz, Blues, Pop
- Length: 1:41:41
- Label: Kikitépe Cassette

Jarle Bernhoft chronology
Ceramik City Chronicles (2009)	1:Man 2:Band (2010)	Solidarity Breaks (2011)

1: Man 2: Band is a live double album by the Norwegian singer, multi-instrumentalist, composer and performer Jarle Bernhoft, recorded in 2009 and released in 2010.

== Track listing ==
Source: Gubemusic

1: Man (Disc One); Live at Kampen Bistro
No.	Title	Length
1.	"Ever Since I Was A Little Kid"	4:56
2.	"On Time"	5:30
3.	"Sunday"	6:24
4.	"Fly Away"	6:33
5.	"Streetlights"	4:14
6.	"He Ain`t Heavy, He`s My Brother"	8:07
7.	"Tickly Foot (Improvised)"	5:37
8.	"So Many Faces"	5:28
9.	"A Bad Place To Reside"	3:17

2: Band (Disc Two); Live at Rockefeller Center Jan 09
No.	Title	Length
1.	"On Patience -"	4:47
2.	"Rats & Raccoons"	4:15
3.	"So Many Faces"	5:00
4.	"Sing Hello And Some More"	5:34
5.	"On Individuality"	2:55
6.	"Prayer To A Landlord"	7:37
7.	"Firm & Deep"	7:04
8.	"In The Street Where The World Passes Me By"	7:55
9.	"Them Changes"	6:28

== Personnel ==
=== 1: Man ===
- Jarle Bernhoft - vocals, guitar, synthesizer, beats

=== 2: Band ===
- Jarle Bernhoft - Vocals, Guitars, Effects, Flute, Keyboard
- Hedvig Mollestad Thomassen, Guitar, Vocals
- Line Horntveth - Percussion, Flute, vocals
- David Wallumrød - Wurlitzer, Hammond Organ, Clavinette
- Audun Erlien - Bass
- Martin Windstad - Percussion
- Torstein Lofthus - Drums
