= Ivar Loe Bjørnstad =

Norwegian jazz and rock musician

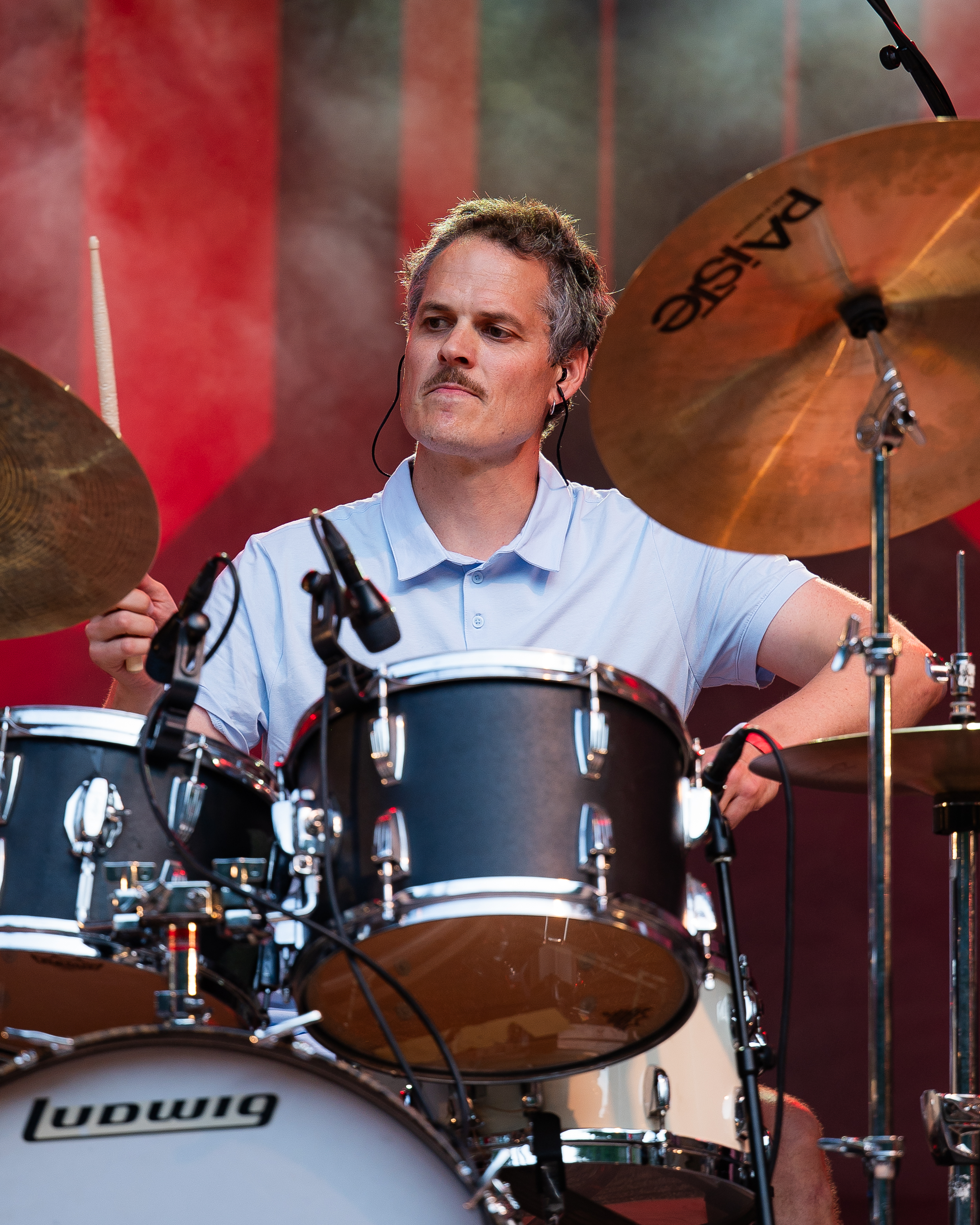
- With Hedvig Mollestad Trio, 2025

Background information
- Born: Surnadal Municipality, Møre og Romsdal, Norway
- Genres: Prog rock and jazz
- Instrument: Drums

Ivar Loe Bjørnstad is a Norwegian jazz and rock drummer.

== Early life and education ==
Ivar Loe Bjørnstad was born in Surnadal Municipality in Møre og Romsdal, Norway. He is the brother of the dancer Marit Loe Bjørnstad and the singer Ingebjørg Loe Bjørnstad.

Bjørnstad studied jazz at the Norwegian Academy of Music in Oslo together with Hedvig Mollestad Thomassen and Even Helte Hermansen (guitarist of Bushman's Revenge).

== Career ==
With an origin as a rock musician, Bjørnstad mentions the guitarist Bill Frisell as one of his inspirations, along with Norwegian drummers Audun Kleive and Per Oddvar Johansen.

Since 2000 he has collaborated with many bands and artists in a variety of genres. He has collaborated with artists like Bjørn Kjellemyr, Jon Eberson, Karl Seglem, and Ken Stringfellow. In 2013 he was playing with Hedvig Mollestad Trio, the Hilde Marie Kjersem Band, and Cakewalk. The debut album Shoot! of the Hedvig Mollestad Trio was recorded live in the studio with only a few minor overdubs.

== Discography ==
=== With the Hedvig Mollestad Trio ===
- 2011: Shoot! (Rune Grammofon)
- 2013: All Of Them Witches (Rune Grammofon)
- 2014: Enfant Terrible! (Rune Grammofon)
- 2016: Black Stabat Mater (Rune Grammofon)
- 2016: Evil In Oslo (Rune Grammofon)

=== With Cakewalk ===
- 2012: Wired (Rune Grammofon)
