= Span (band) =

Norwegian rock band

SPAN
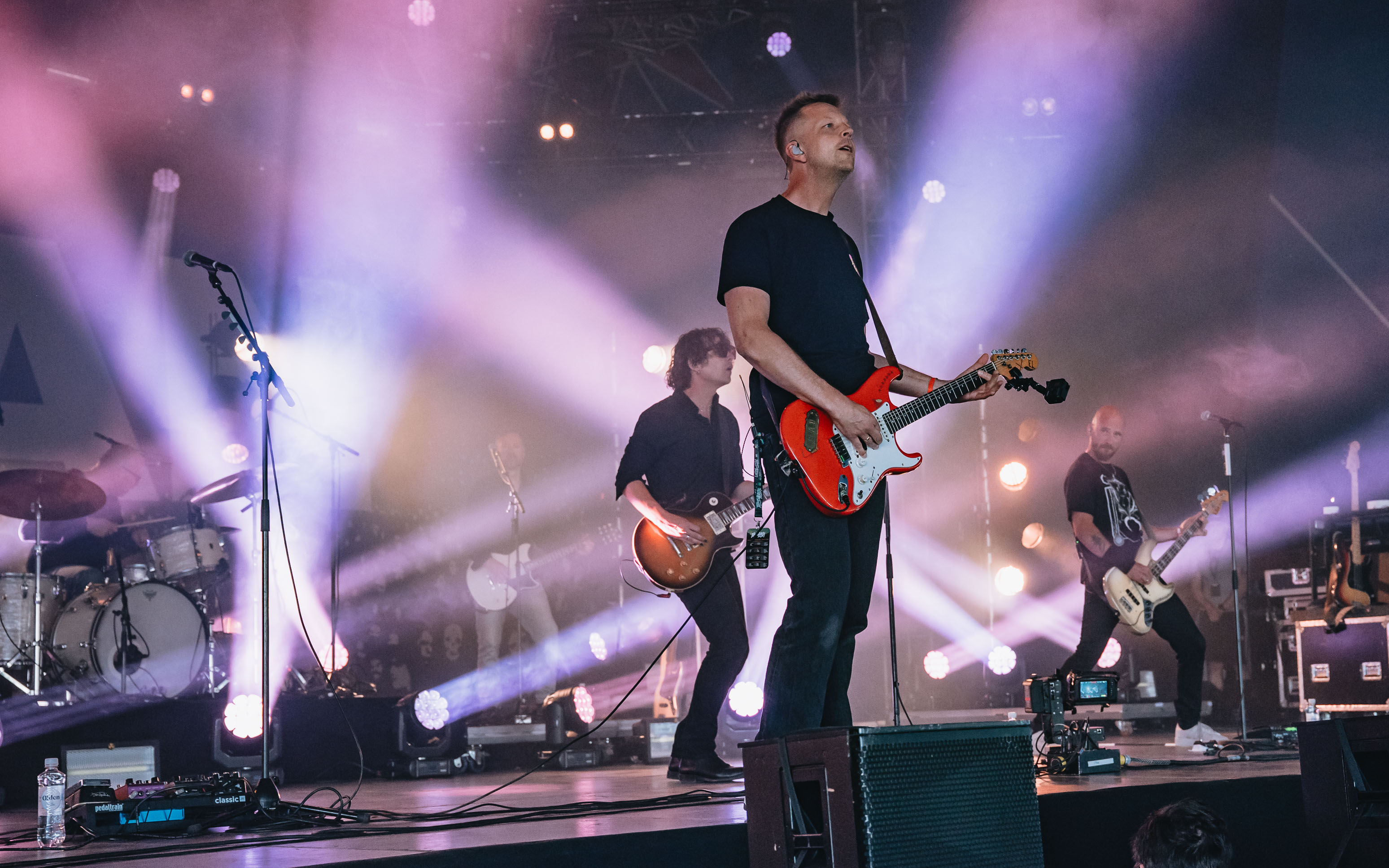
- At the Tons of Rock festival in Oslo, 2024; Photo: Birgit Fostervold

Background information
- Origin: Norway
- Genres: Alternative rock, hard rock
- Years active: 2000–2005, 2024
- Labels: Island; Johnny Nowhere / Mercury
- Members: Jarle Bernhoft; Fridtjof Nilsen; Fredrik Wallumrød; Kim Nordbæk
- Past members: Vemund Stavnes

SPAN is a Norwegian rock band that formed in 2000 from the remnants of two other outfits, Explicit Lyrics and Squid. Self-proclaimed as "Norwegian Turbo-Rock 'n' Roll Commandos", the band was made up of Jarle Bernhoft on lead vocals and guitar, Fridtjof Nilsen on guitar and backing vocals, Vemund Stavnes on bass and Fredrik Wallumrød on drums and backing vocals. When Stavnes left in 2003, he was replaced by Kim Nordbæk.

SPAN spent much of the years between 2002 and 2004 touring the UK and Norway as well as spending a brief time in the US. To date, they have sold over 55,000 albums worldwide.

In August 2005, SPAN announced that they were to take an unspecified break. A post on their website at the time stated that the band "no longer share a common dream and ambition" and that they have "decided to end this while we are still the best of friends". In late 2023, the band announced reunion shows at Rockefeller Music Hall in February 2024, twenty years after the release of their debut album.

== Labels ==
In the Summer of 2002, the band signed to Island Records, recording their debut album at RAK Studios in London with producer Gil Norton. Despite much interest gained from incessant touring and the minor-hit singles 'Found' and 'Don't Think The Way They Do', Island held back the album Mass Distraction until 2004, a year after its originally planned release date, and much of the early impetus was lost.

SPAN then tried to establish themselves in the US but were unsuccessful after attempts to sign with Geffen Records and Interscope Records fell through. In fact Interscope had agreed to sign the band after an impressive showcase gig at LA's Troubadour. However, following roster rationalisation at the label, SPAN were unceremoniously discarded without releasing a note Stateside. Additional tracks were recorded for a planned US version of the album but this never saw the light of day. The track "Stay As You Are" featured on a US TV Nissan car ad, which attracted considerable public attention, but the opportunity had gone. Additionally, their song 'Don't Think the Way They Do' was featured in Gran Turismo 4.

Their second album, Vs. Time, was released in Norway only, on the Johnny NoWhere/Mercury label. Despite a domestic hit single with 'Cut Like Diamonds' peaking at number two, by the Summer of 2005 the band had decided to split, with singer Jarle keen to pursue a more mellow style. The band played their final gig before a sold-out Oslo crowd in October 2005.

== Life after SPAN ==
On 1 September 2008, singer Jarle Bernhoft released his first solo album "Ceramik City Chronicles" and he has gone on to pursue a successful solo career, releasing a number of other albums. He has done work with acclaimed Norwegian artists, including Kristin Asbjørnsen, Shining, Bigbang and Hanne Hukkelberg, doing guitar, bass, percussion, vocals, flute, et al. Guitarist Joff Nilsen, bassist Kim Nordbæk and drummer Fredrik Wallumrød formed the heavier metal outfit Dog Almighty, with singer Sindri from the Norwegian band Farout Fishing. Their debut release emerged in the autumn of 2007 but didn't have the pop sensibility of SPAN. Sindri subsequently departed the band and though auditions took place for a new singer, the band folded.

Freddy has played with Norwegian metallers El Caco, whilst Kim worked with the melodic local outfit Sibir. Meanwhile Joff focused on session work, production and developing a TV career.

On 24 January 2011 the release "Container" saw the light of day. This multivocalist 12-track cd, written by Freddy and Joff, has Jarle singing on one of the tracks along with other vocalists like Venke Knutson, Thom Hell and Shaun Bartlett to name a few. No touring to promote the album took place, with all the vocalists focusing on their own careers.

== Band members ==
- Jarle Bernhoft: lead vocals, guitar
- Fridtjof "Joff" Nilsen: guitar, backing vocals
- Kim Nordbæk: bass, backing vocals
- Fredrik Wallumrød: drums, backing vocals

=== Ex-members ===
- Vemund "Wes" Stavnes: bass, backing vocals

== Discography ==
=== Albums ===
Album details	Peak positions
Album details	NOR
Mass Distraction: Year released: 2003; Record label: Island Records	5
Vs. Time: Year released: 2005; Record label: Johnny Nowhere / Universal / Mercury	4

=== Singles ===
Year	Single	Peak positions	Album
Year	Single	NOR	Album
2001	"Missing in Stereo"	—	Mass Distraction
2002	"On My Way Down" b/w "Stuck In The Middle"	—	Mass Distraction
2002	"Baby's Come Back" b/w "Always Ends"	—	Mass Distraction
2003	"Papa" b/w "Odour Eleven"	—	Mass Distraction
2003	"Found" b/w "Crash & Burn" and "Mental Surgery"	14	Mass Distraction
2004	"Don't Think the Way They Do" b/w "Dive Motherf*cker"	11	Mass Distraction
2004	"Stay As You Are"	—	Mass Distraction
2005	"Cut Like Diamonds"	2	Vs. Time
2005	"The Outside"	—	Vs. Time

=== EPs & other singles ===
- 2002: Baby's Come Back EP

"Baby's Come Back", "On My Way Down", "Found", "Always Ends" (non-album track), "Thunder Blues" (non-album track)

- 2005: Cut Like Diamonds EP

"Cut Like Diamonds", "Psycho Killer" (non-album track), "Dive Down With Me" (non-album track), "Peaceful" (live)

=== Other songs ===
- 2005: "Parasite" (from Gods of Thunder: Norwegian Tribute to Kiss)
