= Magnus Bakken =

Norwegian jazz saxophonist and composer

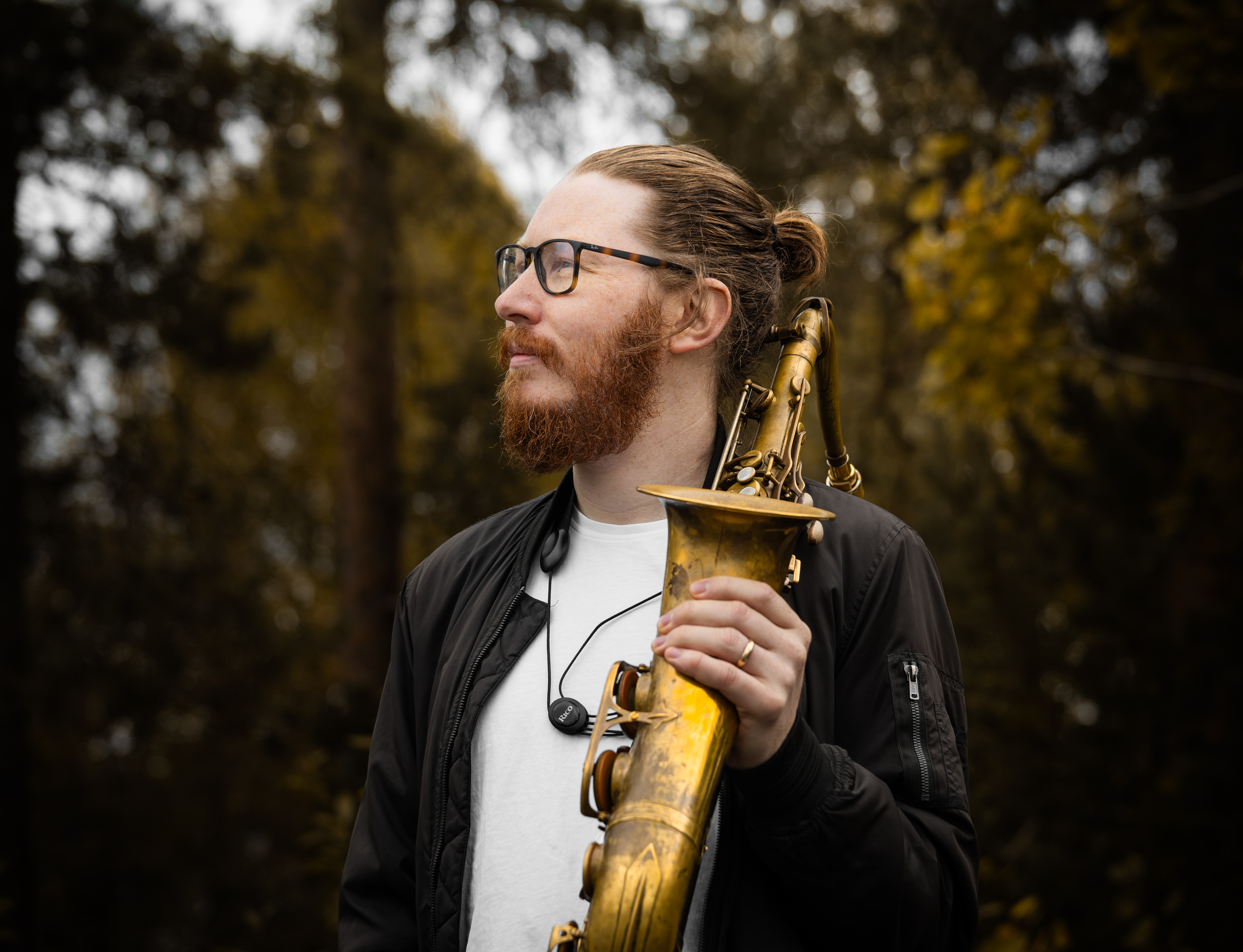
- photo by: Magnus Bakken

Background information
- Born: 4 November 1991 (age 34); Lillehammer
- Origin: Norway
- Occupations: Performing artist and composer
- Instruments: Tenor Saxophone, Soprano Saxophone
- Member of: We Say, A Tonic For The Troops, Cosmopolitan
- Formerly of: Ninjabeat, Magnus Bakken Quartet
- Website: magnusbakken.com

Magnus Bakken (born 1991) is a Norwegian jazz saxophonist and composer, born in Lillehammer. He plays primarily tenor and soprano saxophone, and has studied at Berklee College of Music and The Norwegian Academy Of Music and is known for his solo career as well as various band collaborations.

Bakken was commissioned to write a work for the opening concert of DølaJazz 2022. The participating musicians were Jørn Øien (piano), Bo Berg (bass), and Amund Kleppan (drums). The music was recorded and released as the album Slackline in 2024.

Since 2024 he has collaborated with Italian trumpeter Cosimo Boni, releasing music written by Bakken and Boni on the album We Say. Other musicians on the project are Håkon Huldt-Nystrøm (bass) and Amund Kleppan (drums).

Since 2021, he has been a member of bassist Ellen Brekken’s quartet, A Tonic for the Troops, which also includes Espen Berg (piano) and Magnus Sefaniassen Eide (drums).

In 2015 he released his debut album Cycles as part of his master's studies at the Norwegian Academy of Music, with musicians Jørn Øien (piano), Christian Meaas Svendsen (bass) and Jon Audun Baar (drums).

He also led the fusion band Ninjabeat, which released two albums of Bakken's compositions.

In 2009, at the age of 17, he reached the finals of Toneprisen, a competition for young solo musicians aged 16–23 from the counties of Hedmark and Oppland. In the finals—where he was the only contestant not playing a classical piece—he finished in second place and won the audience vote. The competition was organized by NRK in collaboration with Eidsiva Energi and Toneheim Folk High School.

== Discography ==
=== Solo albums ===
- 2015: Cycles – Magnus Bakken Quartet feat. George Garzone (AMP Music & Records)
- 2024: Slackline (Losen Records)
- 2025: We Say – featuring Cosimo Boni, Håkon Huldt-Nystrøm and Amund Kleppan

=== With A tonic for the troops ===
- 2021: Ambush (ODIN records)
- 2023: Realm Of Opportunities (ODIN records)

=== With Jørn Øien ===
- 2023: Cosmopolitan (Curling Legs)

=== With Ninjabeat ===
- 2016: The Waiting Game (AMP Music & Records)
- 2018: West (AMP Music & Records)

=== With Nordic Circles ===
- 2017: Under The Clouds (AMP Music & Records)
