= Norbelis Lameda =

Norbelis Jossiebel Lameda (born 26 June 1988) is a Venezuelan musician (trumpet), composer, arranger and jazz teacher.

== Biography ==
Lameda is educated at UPEL Instituto Pedagógico de Barquisimeto. In 2010, after working as a music teacher for several institutions, she founded Pandijazz, a jazz school for children. The project has gained attention throughout Venezuela and abroad, and is considered to be the only jazz school of its kind in South America.
