= Short Stories of Happiness =

Studio album by Kristoffer Kompen Quartet
- Released: 2011
- Recorded: Musikkloftet, March 17 & 18, 2010
- Genre: Swing jazz
- Length: 45:40
- Label: Schmell!
- Producer: Kristoffer Kompen

Kristoffer Kompen chronology
Short Stories of Happiness (2011)	A Tribute to Jack Teagarden (2013)

Short Stories of Happiness (released 2011 in Oslo, Norway, by the label Schmell! – SMLCD216) is the debut album of the Norwegian trombonist Kristoffer Kompen within his own quartet.

Professional ratings
Review scores
Source	Rating
Dagbladet	5/6 stars

== Critical reception ==
The review by Terje Mosnes of the Norwegian newspaper Dagbladet awarded the album 5 stars (dice) With this debut album, Kompen shows stylish contemporary jazz and is one of the big surprises of Norwegian jazz. Those who have listened to this music has marked the mame Kristoffer Kompen, but then most often in connection to swing and trad jazz. Her he shows skills and creative abilities in other musical directions.

NRK Jazz critique Erling Wicklund, in his review of Kompen's album Short Stories of Happiness states:

... The new generation of Norwegian jazz master everything and they deny themselves nothing - traditional jazz and avant-garde are equivalent expression to use for desire and need ...

== Track listing ==
All compositions by Kristoffer Kompen

1. "Short Story Waltz" (5:53)
2. "Summer Dreams" (7:37)
3. "Owana Dome" (3:17)
4. "Teiresius" (6:10)
5. "Love Is Funny" (4:43)
6. "Ballad of Happiness" (3:42)
7. "Jylland" (4:58)
8. "Roasted Duck" (6:01)
9. "Collembole March" (2:04)
10. "Kaba" (3:34)

== Personnel ==
Kristoffer Kompen Quartet

- Kristoffer Kompen - trombone
- Eirik Hegdal - saxophone
- Eyolf Dale - piano
- Jo Skaansar - double bass
- Andreas Bye - drums

== Credits ==
- Recorded by Vidar Lunden at Musikkloftet, March 17 and 18, 2010
- Mixed by Henning Bortne at Oslo Mastering, August 30, 2010
- Produced by Kristoffer Kompen
- Drawn & designed by Øystein Runde

== Notes ==
- This record is supported by: Lions club, Bøler, The Norwegian Academy of Music & Statkraft
- Kristoffer Kompen is awarded this years "Young Star" Scholarship 2010!
