= Aage Teigen =

Norwegian jazz trombonist and economist

- Born: 17 July 1944; Nore og Uvdal, Buskerud
- Origin: Norway
- Died: 15 January 2014 (aged 69) Oslo
- Genre: Jazz
- Occupations: Musician, economist
- Instrument: Trombone

Aage Teigen (17 July 1944 – 15 January 2014) was a Norwegian jazz musician (trombone) and economist born and raised in Oslo. He was from a number of orchestras and active on the Oslo jazz scene. He initiated the Oslo Jazzfestival and led the festival between 1986 and 2007. He has played in Per Borthen's Swing Dept. and Christiania Jazzband, as well as Christiania 12. Teigen received the Oslo City Culture Award in 2002 for his efforts for the Oslo Jazzfestival. Han mottok Oslo Jazzfestivals pris Ella prize in 2011.

Teigen died 15 January 2014 after a short-term illness.
