= Hedvig Mollestad Thomassen =

Hedvig Mollestad
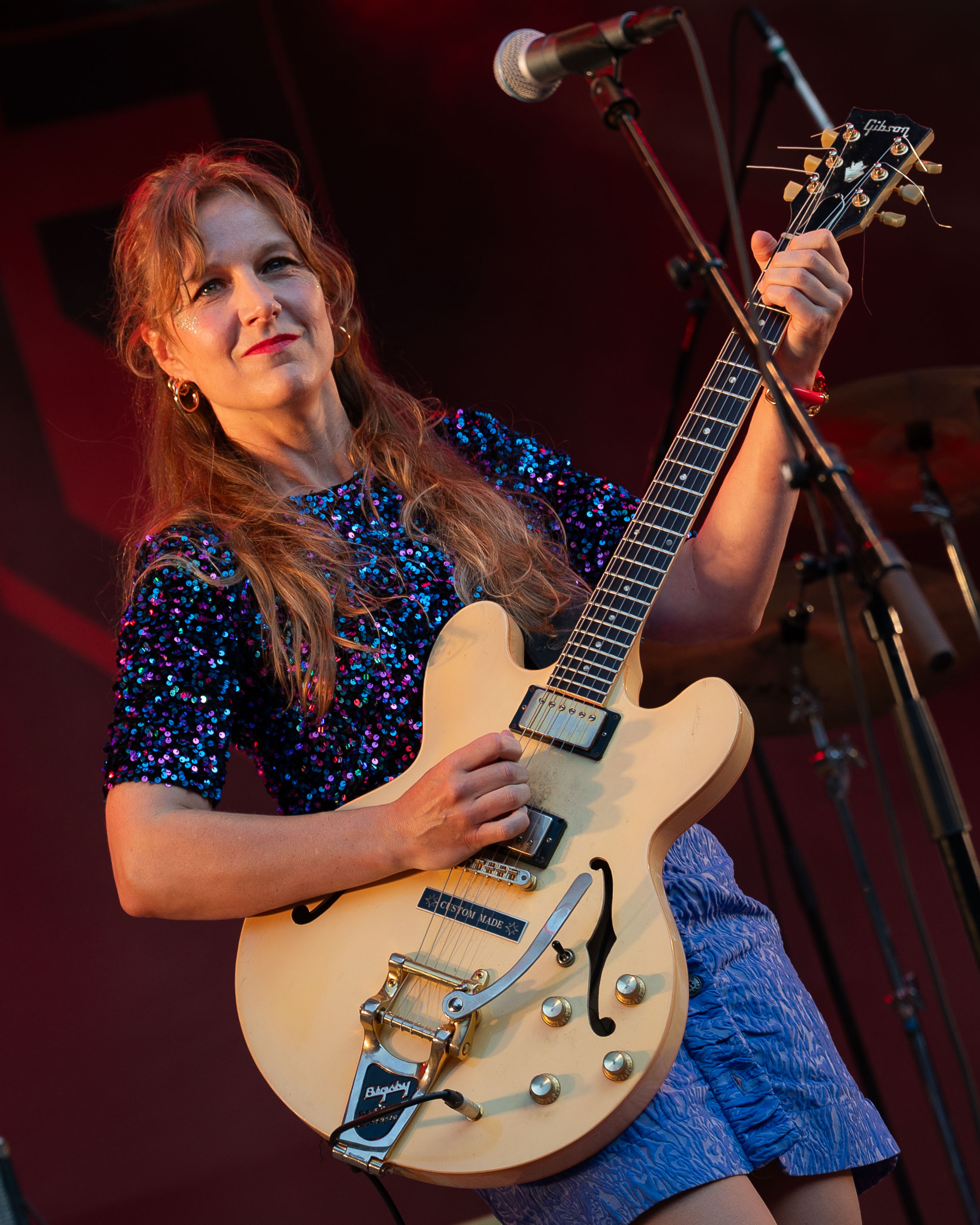
- Hedvig Mollestad Thomassen, 2025

Background information
- Born: Hedvig Mollestad Thomassen; 4 February 1982 (age 44); Ålesund, Møre og Romsdal
- Origin: Norway
- Genres: Jazz
- Occupations: Musician and composer
- Instrument: Guitar
- Label: Rune Grammofon
- Website: hedvigmollestad.com

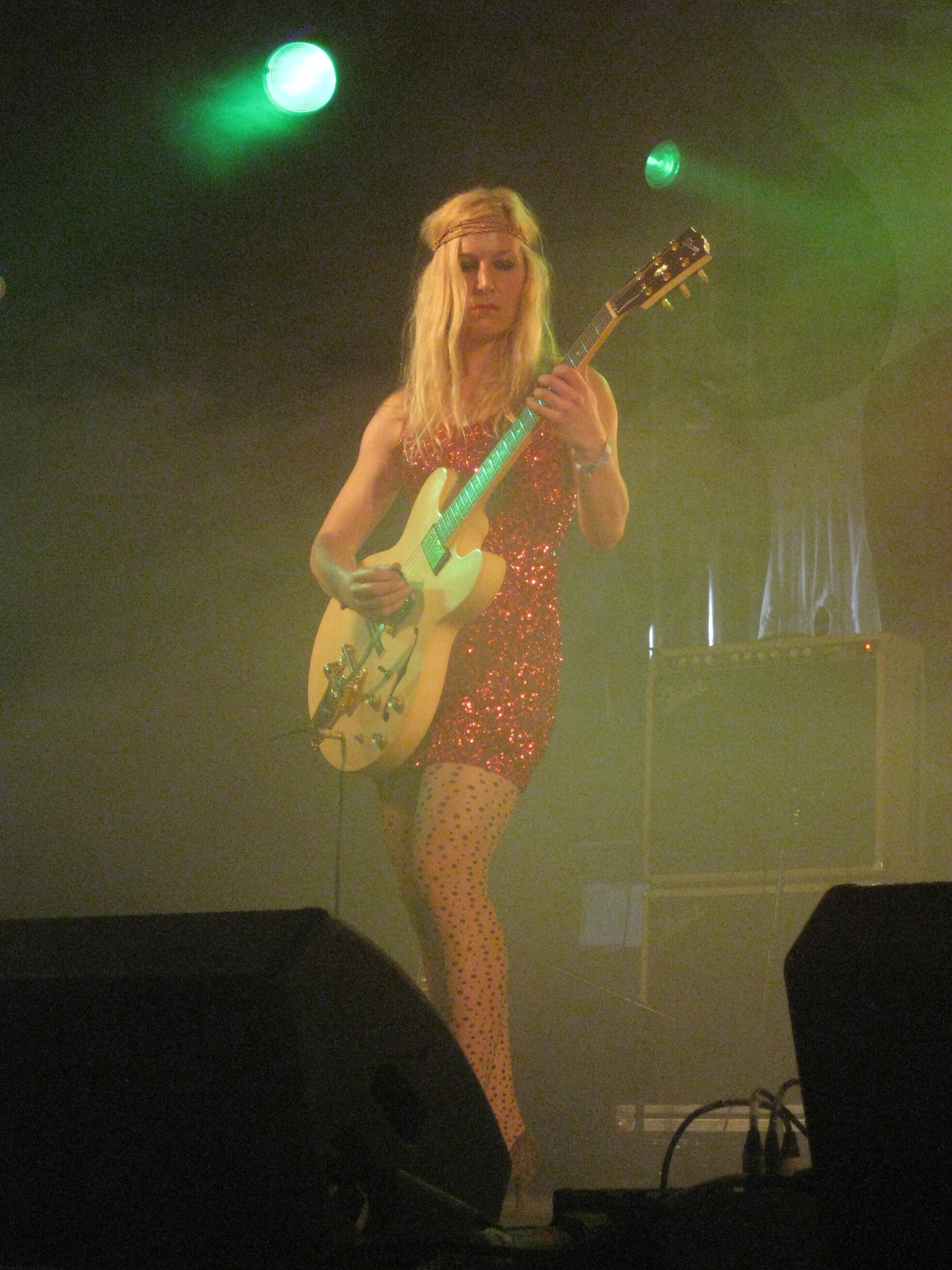
Hedvig Mollestad at Øyafestivalen, 2012

Hedvig Mollestad Thomassen (born 4 February 1982) is a Norwegian guitarist, vocalist and composer. She is known for a series of album releases and collaborations with musicians like Jon Eberson, Jarle Bernhoft and Hilde Marie Kjersem.

== Career ==
Thomassen was born in Ålesund. She is a graduate from the Norwegian Academy of Music, and performs with a variety of rock and jazz bands, including her own Hedvig Mollestad Trio, Bronco Busters, Songs and Sweet Potatoes, and VOM (as "Mester Pøggs"). She also has a central role in the bands of Jarle Bernhoft and Hilde Marie Kjersem, and has performed with Trondheim Jazz Orchestra. Thomassen was awarded "The young jazz talent of the year" at Moldejazz in 2009, and played a gig within Jarle Bernhoft Band at the 2011 Kongsberg Jazzfestival. When she released her debut solo album Shoot! (2011) leading her own trio, the music bears little resemblance to what she plays with Jon Eberson Group and the bands of Hilde Marie Kjersem and Jarle Bernhoft.

=== Hedvig Mollestad Trio ===
Hedvig Mollestad Trio (also referred to as HM3) consists of Hedvig Mollestad (guitar, vocals), Ellen Brekken (bass) and Ivar Loe Bjørnstad (drums). The trio has received numerous appraising reviews internationally, for both their studio albums and live performances. Their music is inspired by '70s heavyrock, but creates a peculiar musical mixture of ingredients like free jazz, prog and psychedelia. On its website the band describes their own music as "Outgoing & progressive instrumental rock". Since the trio's formation in 2009, HM3 has played many concerts and jazz festivals in both Norway and abroad and they have toured in Europe, Malaysia, Japan and the USA. In reviews of two of the band's albums, All About Jazz critique John Kelman states:

... With its diversity of feel and breadth of aural landscapes, it's a record that may well engender some internal fist-pumping, but Hedvig Mollestad Trio's compelling writing and take-no-prisoners approach to playing show it clearly has plenty more to offer than much of the musical space it occupies... (Album: "All Of Them Witches")

Many bands use the studio as something different than live performance—and there's no doubt that there's better control over sound—but Hedvig Mollestad Trio makes clear, on all its recordings, that it is recorded live in the studio. It's a challenge to make records that capture the sheer energy, monumental power and flat-out attitude of live performance, but as much as Hedvig Mollestad Trio kicks serious butt onstage, it manages to do the same thing in the studio... (Album: "Enfant Terrible")

=== Hedvig Mollestad Weejuns ===
In 2023, Mollestad formed a new trio, called Weejuns, with the keyboardist Ståle Storløkken from Elephant9, and the drummer Ole Mofjell.

== Prizes and honors ==
- 2009: Jazztalentprisen for The young jazz talent of the year awarded at Moldejazz
- 2020: EDVARD-prisen for the album Ekhidna

== Discography ==
=== Hedvig Mollestad Trio ===
- 2011: Shoot! (Rune Grammofon)
- 2013: All of Them Witches (Rune Grammofon)
- 2014: Enfant Terrible! (Rune Grammofon)
- 2016: Black Stabat Mater (Rune Grammofon)
- 2016: Evil In Oslo (Rune Grammofon)
- 2019: Smells Funny (Rune Grammofon)
- 2021: Ding Dong. You're Dead. (Rune Grammofon)
- 2025: Bees in the Bonnet (Rune Grammofon)

=== Hedvig Mollestad ===
Solo albums

- 2020: Ekhidna
- 2021: Tempest Revisited

=== Hedvig Mollestad Weejuns ===
- 2023: Weejuns (Rune Grammofon)
- 2026: Bitches Blues (Rune Grammofon)

=== Collaborations ===
With The Cumshots

- 2009: A Life Less Necessary (Rodeostar Records)

With Jarle Bernhoft

- 2010: 1:Man 2:Band (Kikitépe Cassette)

With Jon Eberson Group

- 2011: The Coarse Sand & The Names We Wrote (JEG Records)

With Trondheim Jazz Orchestra

- 2011: Migrations (MNJ Records), feat. Øyvind Brække
- 2022: Maternity Beat (Rune Grammofon)

With Hilde Marie Kjersem

- 2011: Let's Let Go (Brødr. Recordings)

With "El Doom & The Born Electric"

- 2012: El Doom & The Born Electric (Rune Grammofon)
