= Ceramik City Chronicles =

Studio album by Jarle Bernhoft
- Released: 7 July 2009
- Recorded: 7 July 2009
- Genre: Soul, jazz, blues, pop
- Length: 46:12
- Label: Decca International

Jarle Bernhoft chronology
Ceramik City Chronicles (2009)	1:Man 2:Band (2010)

Ceramik City Chronicles is the debut studio album by Norwegian multi-instrumentalist Jarle Bernhoft.

== Track listing ==
No.	Title	Length
1.	"On Time"	3:49
2.	"So Many Faces"	4:05
3.	"Streetlights"	3:32
4.	"Sunday"	5:41
5.	"Fly Away"	4:09
6.	"On Individuality"	2:04
7.	"In The Street Where The World Passes Me By"	4:22
8.	"Prayer To A Landlord"	5:17
9.	"Rats & Raccoons"	4:10
10.	"Firm & Deep"	4:25
11.	"On Patience"	4:38
Total length:		46:12

== Personnel ==
- Jarle Bernhoft - vocals, guitar, synthesizer, beats
