= Gerhard Aspheim =

- Born: 27 September 1930; Oslo, Norway
- Origin: Norway
- Died: 21 November 2009 (aged 79) Oslo, Norway
- Genres: Jazz
- Occupations: Musician, composer
- Instruments: Trombone, multi instrumentalist
- Formerly of: Aspheim Oldtimers
- Website: www.aspheim.no/historie

Gerhard Aspheim (27 September 1930 – 21 November 2009) was a Norwegian jazz trombonist.

== Career ==
Aspheim was a member of Norway's first trad jazz band, Dixie Serenaders, from 1949 to 1952, and a member of Big Chief Jazzband from 1952 to 1978. He launched his own orchestra, Aspheim Oldtimers, in 1979. Aspheim Oldtimers appeared at several jazz festivals in Norway and Germany and toured extensively in Europe. The orchestra had seven album releases. Aspheim also ran and developed the family business Aspheim Flygel- og Pianosenter, which he acquired in 1954 and developed into one of Scandinavia's largest piano companies.

Aspheim was the eldest and a natural leader type. People thought he was the "Big Chief", and he was the obvious chairman of "The Big Chief Jazz Club" in the basement of Majorstuhuset (1953–65). His lectures on jazz history, which often spanned to 1930, were legendary. He also promoted the annual Norwegian Championship for amateur jazz bands (1954–1964), the Journal Jazz Society (1957–59), Kunstnerkroa (1957–60) and the Metropol Jazz Center in Akersgata (1960–65). In addition, he held several positions in the Norwegian Jazz Federation in the first five years after it was founded (1953). He received an honorary award at the 2004 Oslo Jazzfestival.

Aspheim inherited the family business Aspheim’s Flygel og Pianosenter in 1954. After finishing his education at Schimmel Pianofortefabrik, Braunschweig, West Germany, in 1957, he developed the company through 1960s, 1970s and 1980s to become one of the largest piano firms in Scandinavia. The company's close ties to the Schimmel family in Braunschweig were important for this process. Aspheim worked at the firm until he died in 2009.

== Honors ==
- 2004: Ella-prisen honorary award

== Discography ==
Aspheim Oldtimers

- 1988: Oldtimers
- 1994: Waiting for the Day
- 1997: 18 Jazz Greens Med Aspheim Oldtimers
- 2000: Glemmer Du
- 2003: Passport to the Paradise
- 2004: Aspheim Oldtimers
- 2007: I'll See You in My Dreams
