= Kids in Jazz =

Annual jazz festival in Oslo, Norway

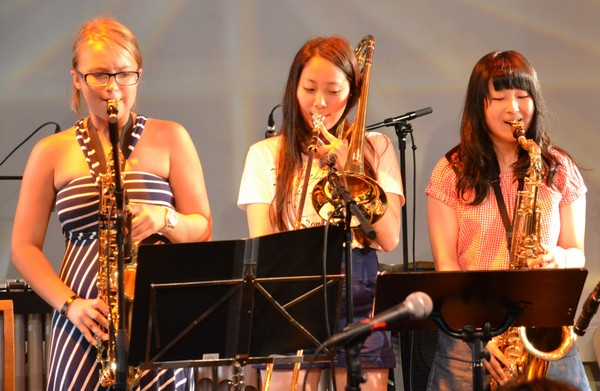
- Children from Norway and Japan playing together in Oslo, during Kids in Jazz closing concert in August 2014. (Photo by M. Bremnes)
- Status: Active
- Genre: Jazz Festival
- Date: Mid August
- Frequency: Annually
- Location: Oslo
- Country: Norway
- Years active: 2012 - present
- Inaugurated: Founded 2011
- Founder: Odd André Elveland
- Website: www.kidsinjazz.com

Kids in Jazz (established 2012 in Norway) is an international jazz festival where children perform. The festival takes place in August, with concerts on numerous stages in Oslo.

== Biography ==
Kids in Jazz was initiated as a cooperation project, involving Improbasen, Sapporo Junior Jazz School, Nasjonal Jazzscene, Oslo Jazzfestival, and Barnas Jazzhus. Once established, the festival demonstrated an international need for a meeting place for the youngest Jazztalents and their tutors. Denmark, Sweden, Iceland, Faroe Islands, Swissland, Austria, Ukraine, Portugal, Italy, Venezuela, Chile, Mexico and Japan kids joined Kids in Jazz since established 2012.

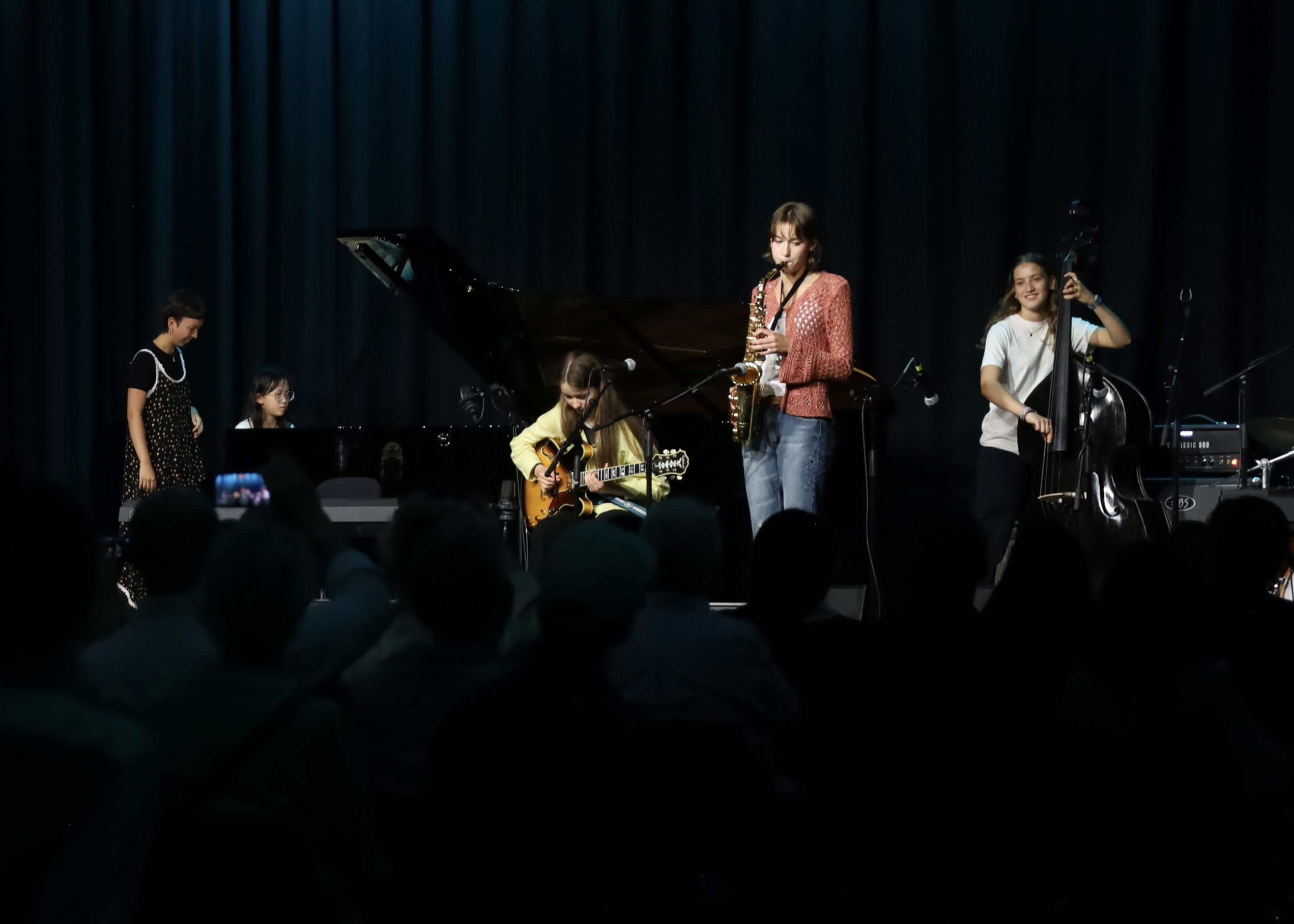
Kids in Jazz 2023-Children from Norway, Denmark and Faroe Islands performed in Sentralen, Oslo

In 2014 Kids in Jazz established a cooperation with the official organizations for jazz in Denmark (JazzDanmark) and Sweden (Svensk Jazz). Kids in Jazz 2014 presented several concerts featuring young performers from Norway, Sweden, Denmark, Switzerland, Austria and Japan. In 2014 the founder of Kids in Jazz Odd André Elveland received the award Ella-prisen for his work with children and jazz.

== Profile ==
The aim of the festival is to give children around the world an opportunity to develop their talent, by performing and by meeting other kids with the same passion for music. Many of the young talents presented during Kids in jazz, are likely to be found in the next generation of international jazz performers.

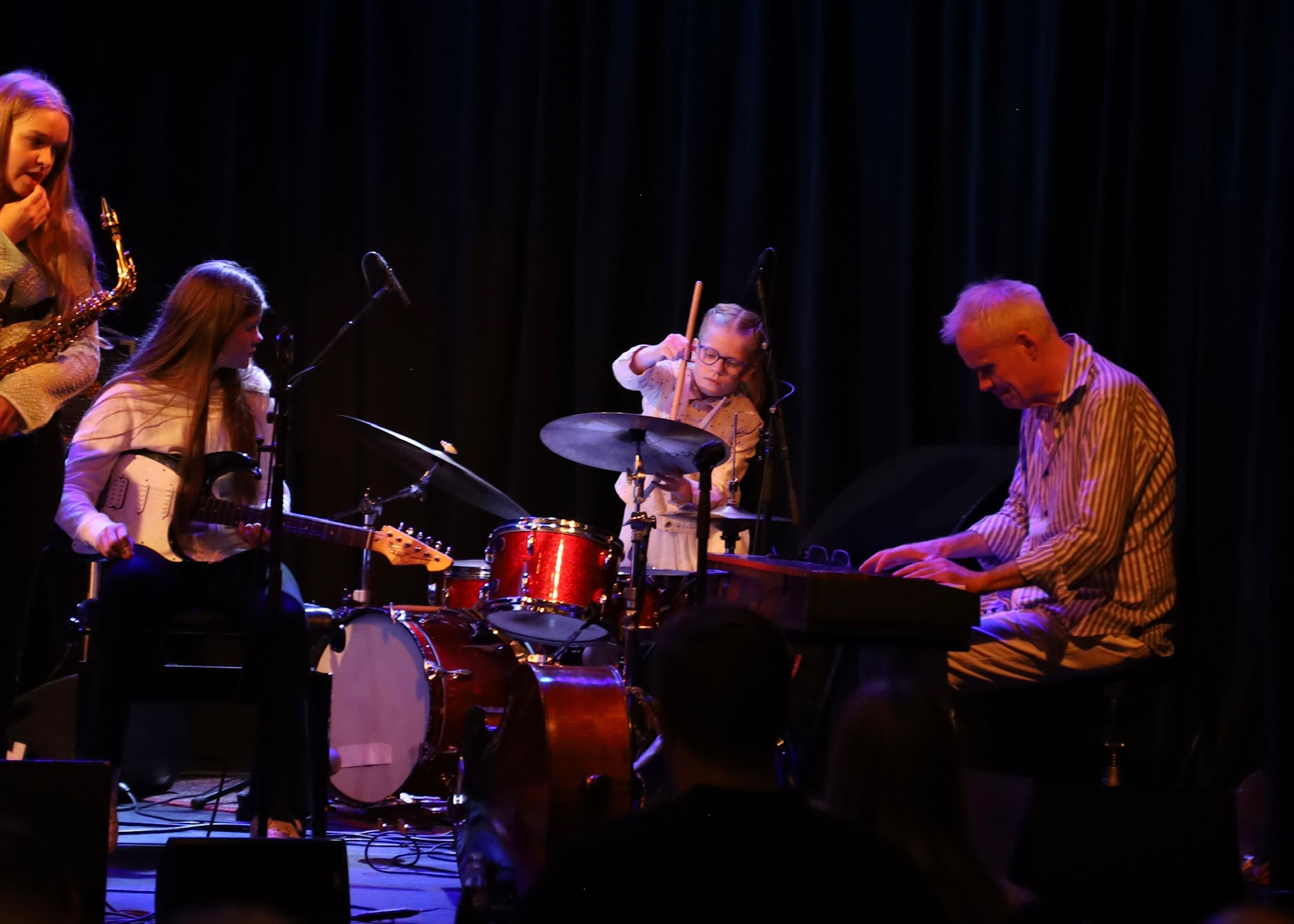
Kids in Jazz 2024-Children from Iceland performed in Nasjonal Jazzscene

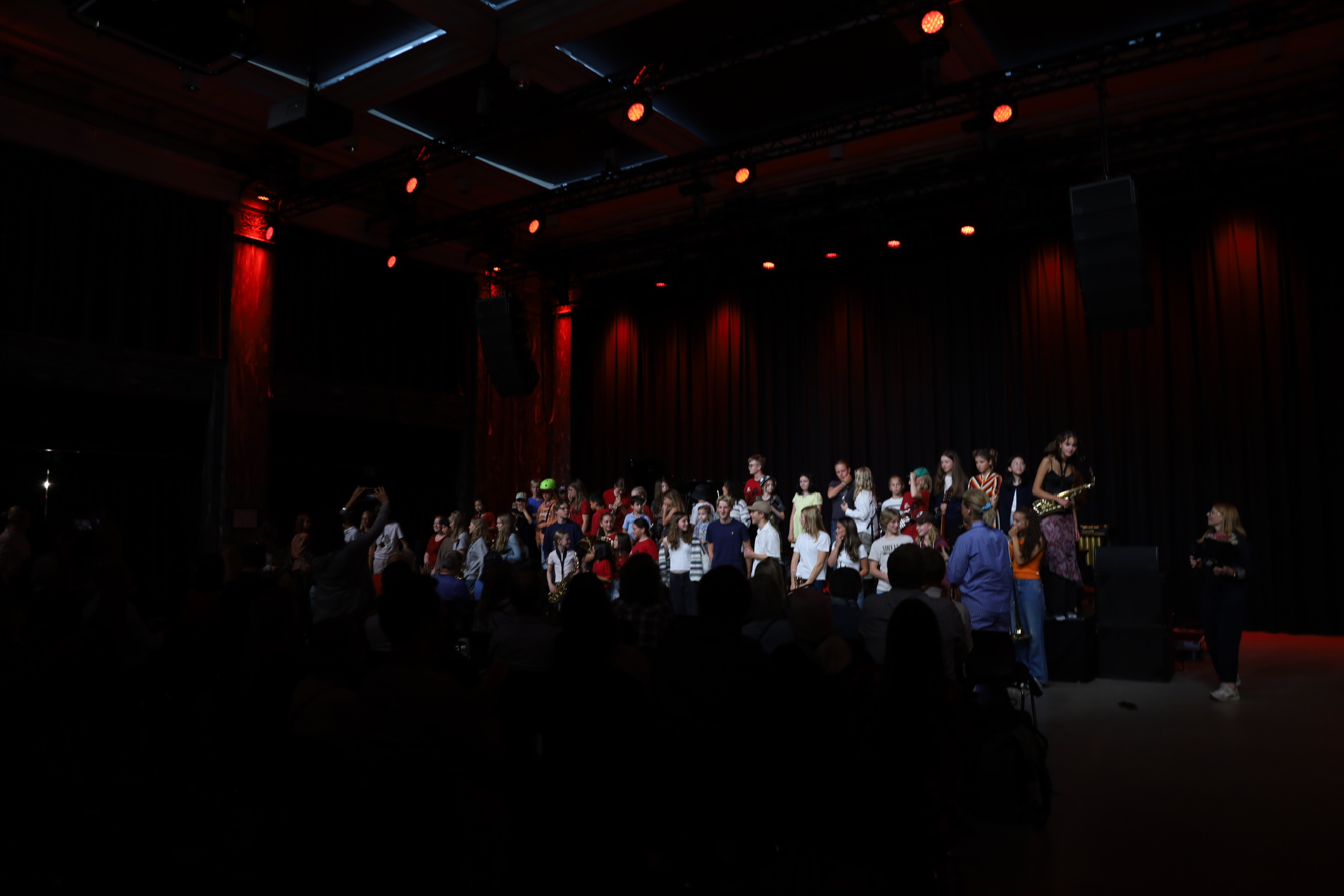
Kids in Jazz 2024-Closing Concert in Sentralen, Oslo
