= Solidarity Breaks =

Studio album by Bern/hoft
- Released: 31 January 2011
- Recorded: 2010
- Genre: Soul, jazz, blues, pop
- Label: Universal Music

Bern/hoft chronology
1:Man 2:Band (2010)	Solidarity Breaks (2011)	Walk With Me (Live at Chateau Neuf) (2011)

Solidarity Breaks is the second solo album of the Norwegian singer, songwriter and musician Jarle Bernhoft and the first one to be credited to his new adopted name Bern/hoft. Released on Universal Music on 31 January 2011, it entered at number 2 in its first week of release, then topped VG-lista the official Norwegian Albums Chart for six consecutive weeks in July and August 2011 (charts 27/2011 to 32/2011 inclusive) and came back to occupy the top of the chart for a seventh week in September in weekly chart 35/2011. The album also charted in Denmark and in France.

Most instrumentation was by Bernhoft himself, but there were guest musicians on the album like Knut Reiersrud (harmonica), English musician Ed Harcourt, Torstein Lofthus (drums), David Wallumrød (keyboards) and Audun Erlien (bass) and Kwame Ogoo (vocals). Fred Ball produced the album, with Steve Fitzmaurice on the mixing. "Choices" was the main single release from the album that also included the immensely popular Bernhoft cover of Tears for Fears classic hit "Shout".

== Track list ==
1. "Sing Hello and Some More" (4:25)
2. "Choices" (3:47)
3. "Stay with Me" (4:22)
4. "Good Intentions" (3:59)
5. "Cmon Talk" (3:41)
6. "A Bad Place to Reside" (1:54)
7. "Control" (3:34)
8. "Space in My Heart" (4:59)
9. "Prophet" (4:36)
10. "Shout" (3:53)
11. "Buzz Aldrin" (5:11)

=== Special edition ===
A special edition was released including four live bonus tracks:

1. "The Light" (live)
2. "In Tangerine" (live)
3. "Choices" (live)
4. "Cmon talk" (live)

== Charts ==
Chart (2011)	Peak position
Danish Albums (Hitlisten)	29
French Albums (SNEP)	64
Norwegian Albums (VG-lista)	1
