= A Tribute to Jack Teagarden =

Studio album by Kristoffer Kompen Quartet
- Released: 2013
- Genre: Swing jazz
- Label: Herman Records
- Producer: Kristoffer Kompen

Kristoffer Kompen chronology
Short Stories of Happiness (2011)	A Tribute to Jack Teagarden (2013)

A Tribute to Jack Teagarden (released 2013 in Oslo, Norway by the label Herman Records – HJCD1043) is the second album by the Norwegian trombonist Kristoffer Kompen.

== Critical reception ==
Professional ratings
Review scores
Source	Rating
Dagbladet	5/6 stars

The review by Terje Mosnes of the Norwegian newspaper Dagbladet awarded the album 5 dice and said that "With his quartet, Kompen takes hold of the music, including Teagarden own "Swingin' on the Teagarden Gate", and he does so with impressive tonal formation and suppleness of phrasing. Although Kompen the recent years has emerged as equally comfortable in modern jazz expression as in trad jazz, it seems that the musical heart of his beats with extra power in the evergreen melody landscape".

== Track listing ==
All compositions by Jack Teagarden

1. "Old Folks"
2. "I Gotta Right to Sing the Blues"
3. "Lover"
4. "Swingin' on the Teagarden Gate"
5. "Diane"
6. "Misery and the Blues"
7. "Love Mee"
8. "Nobody Knows the Trouble I've Seen"
9. "I Swung the Election"
10. "A Hundred Years from Today"
11. "Baby, Won't You Please Come Home"
12. "Stars Fell On Alabama"

== Personnel ==
Kristoffer Kompen Quartet

- Kristoffer Kompen - trombone
- David Skinner - piano
- Børre Frydenlund - guitar & vocals
- Svein Otto Aarbostad - double bass
- Tore Sandbakken - drums
