= Hilde Marie Kjersem =

Norwegian artist and musician

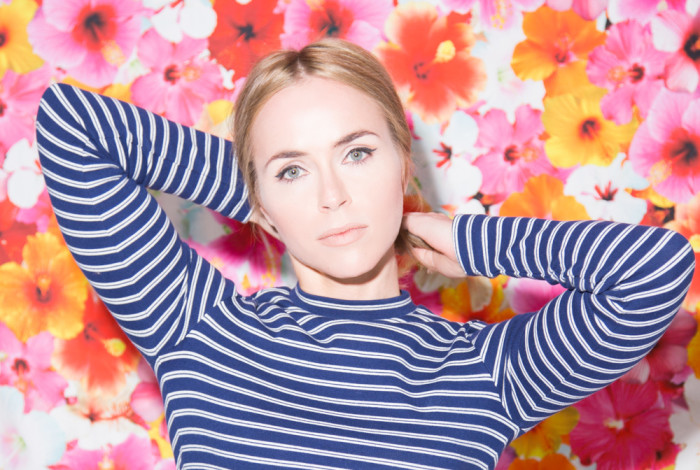
- Kjersem in 2014

Background information
- Also known as: Marie Munroe
- Born: 27 April 1981 (age 44); Ålesund, Møre og Romsdal, Norway
- Genres: Pop
- Occupation: Singer
- Label: Warner Music Norway
- Website: www.mariemunroe.no

Hilde Marie Kjersem, also known as Marie Munroe, (born 27 April 1981 in Ålesund, Norway) is a Norwegian artist, musician and songwriter signed to Warner Music Norway. She started out as a jazz musician, but has had an organic and natural development towards the world of pop. In January 2016, Marie Munroe released her fourth solo album called Under My Skin. Munroe har been nominated for two Norwegian Grammy Awards (Spellemannprisen), and has collaborated with Sivert Høyem and Jarle Bernhoft, among others.

== Career ==
Munroe started her career early, and already as a teenager, she toured with Rikskonsertene, and at sixteen she joined the rock and rap band San Jose. She studied jazz at The Norwegian Academy of Music. At the academy she had the Norwegian guitarist Jon Eberson as her mentor, which turned into a great musical collaboration and three album releases since 2005.

During her studies she also started the band TUB Quartet including Andreas Hessen Schei (piano), Pål Hausken (drums) and Magne Vestrum (bass). They released the album Red Shoes Diary with their own compositions in 2004. In 2006 she traveled with Schei to Nepal and Jazzmandu in Kathmandu founded by Rikskonsertene. In 2010 she left Rune Grammofon and started her own label Brødr. Recordings, with her own recording studio Wazzup Records.

Marie Munroe was earlier performing under her birth name, and released the album A Killer For That Ache (2008), Let's Let Go (2011) and If We Make It to the Future (2013) as Hilde Marie Kjersem, before she took on the artist name 'Marie Munroe'. She was nominated for two Norwegian Grammy's for the album If We Make It to the Future for Female Artist and Composer. In 2013 she won the 'Gammleng-award', and the year after she won the 'Edvardprisen' in the category This Years Challenger for the album If We Make It to the Future. Later, she has released the singles "Like a Drumbeat" (2014), "A Million Things" (2015) and finally the album Under My Skin (2016) as Marie Munroe.

== Discography ==
=== Solo albums ===
- 2008: A Killer For That Ache (Rune Grammofon)
- 2011: Let's Let Go (Warner Music Norway), band members: Peder Kjellsby, Jørgen Munkeby, Magne Vestrum, Jarle Bernhoft, Hedvig Mollestad Thomassen, Even Helte Hermansen, Sjur Miljeteig, Erlend Dalen & Christer Knutsen
- 2013: If We Make It to the Future (Warner Music Norway)
- 2016: Under My Skin (Warner Music Norway)

=== Collaborative works ===
With Jon Eberson

- 2004: Twelve o'clock tales (Curling Legs)
- 2008: Comfort Call (Shipwrecked)
- 2011: The Coarse Sand and the Names We Wrote (J.E.G. Records)
- 2016: "My thieving heart" (Sivert Hoyem, Lioness Album)

Other projects

- 2004: Red Shoes Diary (Curling Legs), with TUB Quartet
- 2005: Would you please welcome (Frode Records), with Christer Knutsen and The Sacred Hearts
- 2006: Grand Hotel,(Frode Records), with Christer Knutsen and The Sacred Hearts

Awards
Preceded by Susanna Wallumrød	Recipient of the Open class Gammleng-prisen; 2013	Succeeded by Hilde Louise Asbjørnsen
