= Kristoffer Kompen =

Norwegian jazz musician (born 1984)

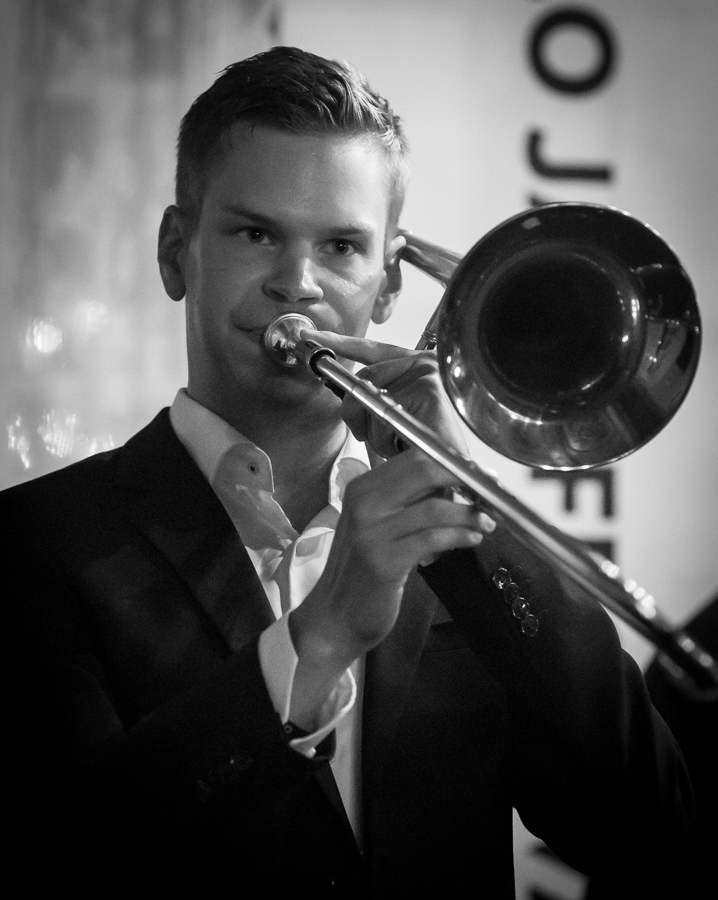
- Kompen at Oslo Jazzfestival 2016

Background information
- Born: 14 August 1984 (age 41); Oslo
- Origin: Norway
- Genres: Jazz
- Occupations: Musician, composer
- Instrument: Trombone
- Website: kristofferkompen.no

Kristoffer Kompen (born 14 August 1984 in Oslo, Norway) is a Norwegian Jazz musician (trombone) and composer, known for a series of performances and recordings within bands like "Jazzin' Babies" and with musicians like Eirik Hegdal, Eyolf Dale, David Skinner, Håkon Storm-Mathisen and Kåre Nymark.

== Career ==
Kompen studied music and music education at the Norwegian Academy of Music (2005–11), and also attended the Agder Musikkonservatorium in Kristiansand (2004/2005) and Kungliga Musikhögskolan in Stockholm (2007/2008). He has toured several times with Rikskonsertene, various big bands and ensembles, theater productions and a variety of bands in jazz and related music. Compensation has been performed in numerous occasions, including with Kringkastingsorkesteret in Den Norske Opera, August 2011.

At 15 years old he joined the orchestra "Jazzin' Babies", and later joined bands like Staffan William-Olsson Sextet and Kåre Nymark Band. He also has two own bands, the Swedish-Norwegian Union Rhythm Kings and Kompen Quintet. Within the latter band, Kompen released his acclaimed debut solo album Short Stories of Happiness in 2011. The reviewer Erling Wicklund of the NRK Jazz states: "The compositions by Kompen are also mysterious, but exciting enough". On his second solo album A Tribute to Jack Teagarden (2013), he has chosen to honor his great inspiration Jack Teagarden (1905–64) by interpreting a dozen tunes from his repertoar. This is to sets the benchmark high as he was the leading jazztrombonisten from the 1920s right up to the bebop revolution of the 1940s. Kompen delivers an even more praised album this time.

Kompen was musically responsible for the ending tour "Swing It, Love It Dig It" by Rikskonsertene 2012 and lead the opening concert of the Oslo Jazzfestival in Den Norske Opera the same year.

== Honors ==
- 2009: Awarded a Scholarship by Lions Club
- 2010: Awarded the Young Star Scholarship by Statkraft

== Discography ==
=== Solo albums ===
- 2011: Short Stories of Happiness (Schmell Records)
- 2013: A Tribute to Jack Teagarden (Herman Records)
- 2014: Agdergata 1 (Kompen Records)

=== Collaborations ===
Within Jazzin' Babies

- 2004: Up and Go! (Herman Records)
- 2006: Rag and Roll! (Herman Records)
- 2008: Live in Holland (Hermann Records)

With other projects

- 2006: Matsukaze (AIM Records), with Håkon Storm-Mathisen
- 2007: The Lesson (Schmell Records), with Norsk Kurveunion
- 2008: A Hot Reunion (Herman Records), with Union Rhythm Kings
- 2008: When The Stevdore Stomps (Stompers), with Stockholm Stompers
- 2008: Forever Candid (Alfred Records/Bonnier Amigo Music), with Marthe Valle
- 2009: Den Blåaste Natt (Talik), with Jo Skaansar
- 2010: Big Shit (Schmell), with T8
- 2011: New Objectiv (Kennel Records), with Ninas Pace
- 2011: Go Marching Home (Kennel Records), with ONTZ!
- 2012: The Death Defying Unicorn (Rune Grammofon), within Trondheim Jazz Orchestra together with Motorpsycho & Ståle Storløkken, live at Moldejazz 2012
- 2012: New Surroundings (Schmell Records), with Kåre Nymark
