= Bent Persson =

Swedish jazz trumpeter and cornetist (born 1947)

Bent Persson (born 6 September 1947) is a Swedish jazz trumpeter and cornetist, internationally renowned for his renditions on three CDs (and LPs) of Louis Armstrong's "50 Hot Choruses" published for Melrose Brothers in Chicago 1927.

== Other sources ==
- The New Grove Dictionary of Jazz - vol.2, ISBN 978-0-312-11357-5
- Jazz: the essential companion Ian Carr/ Fairweather/ Pristley, Paladin, ISBN 0-246-12741-4
- Satchmo - The genius of Louis Armstrong, Gary Giddins, Da Capo Press, 2001, ISBN 978-0306810138
- Bonniers Musiklexikon 2003
- Svensk Jazzhistoria / Erik Kjellberg 1985
