= Mass Distraction =

Studio album by Span
- Released: 2003
- Recorded: 2002–2003
- Genre: Rock
- Producer: Gil Norton

Span chronology
Mass Distraction (2003)	Vs. Time (2005)

Mass Distraction is the debut album by Span and features 11 main tracks and 1 bonus track. The album was produced by Gil Norton (who also produced albums by The Pixies). Their song "Baby's Come Back" appeared in several video games, including the EA Sports video game UEFA Euro 2004 and the Ubisoft published racing game Driver: San Francisco, as well as some movies like Bookies. It also appeared in the beta version of Juiced, along with "Found".

Per Olav Heimstad of Metal Express Radio wrote: "All together this album is one of the most promising debuts I’ve heard for a very long time."

== Track listing ==
1. "Found"
2. "Don't Think the Way They Do"
3. "Peaceful"
4. "Papa"
5. "Stay As You Are"
6. "Missing In Stereo"
7. "On My Way Down"
8. "Buckle Under Pressure"
9. "Baby's Come Back"
10. "Wildflower"
11. "When She Stares"
12. "The End" (bonus)
