= Vs. Time =

Studio album by Span
- Released: 2005
- Genre: Rock

Span chronology
Mass Distraction (2003)	Vs. Time (2005)

Vs. Time is the second album by Span. It features 11 tracks.

The band decided to produce the album themselves, unlike their first album Mass Distraction, which was produced by Gil Norton (who also produced albums by The Pixies).

The track "Cut Like Diamonds" was released as a single and reached number two in the Norwegian chart. The album itself reached the Norwegian top 10. "The Outside" was the only other song to have a promotional music video from the album.

== Track listing ==
1. "Better Believe It"
2. "Cut Like Diamonds"
3. "The Outside"
4. "I'm One of Us"
5. "Living in a Suitcase"
6. "I'm Nothing"
7. "Sea"
8. "Nowhere to be Found"
9. "When I Fall"
10. "Room For One"
11. "Wish It Would Rain"
