= Barnas Jazzhus =

Norwegian children's jazz club

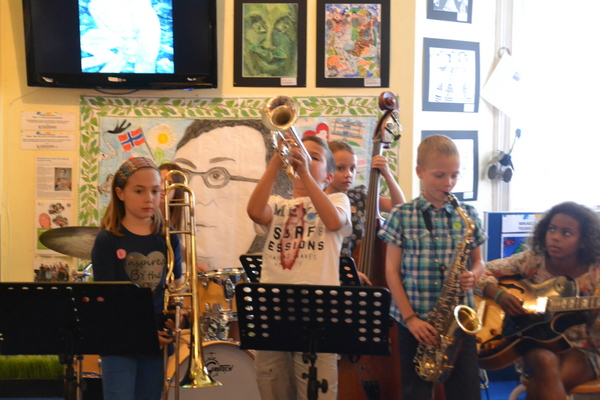
Children from Austria, Switzerland, and Norway playing together at The International Museum of Children's Art in Oslo as part of the festival Kids in Jazz in August 2014 (Photo by M. Bremnes)

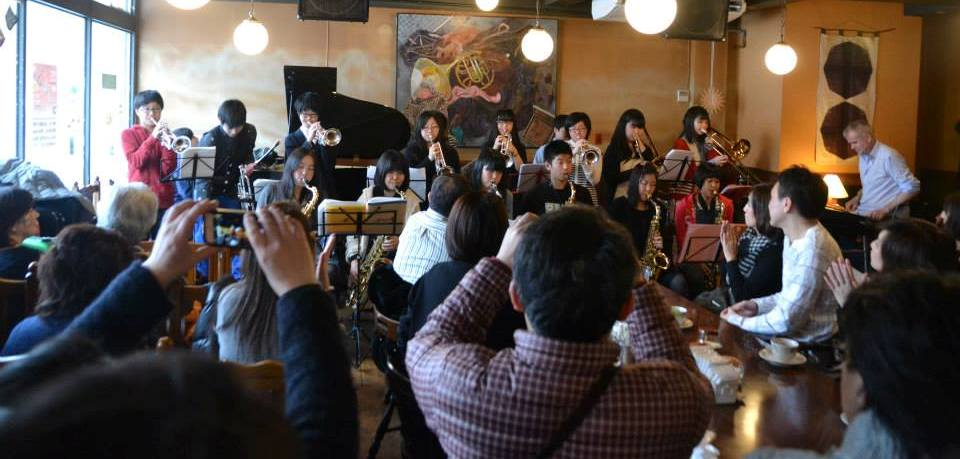
Café concert at the club Kamihikouki in Sapporo, Japan, March 2014 (Photo by Hirokazu Okazaki)

Barnas Jazzhus is a jazz club in Norway specializing in concerts and concepts where children perform jazz. Barnas Jazzhus has presented concerts on several venues in the Oslo area, including Nasjonal jazzscene, which is the main stage for jazz in Norway.

== Biography ==
In 2012 Barnas Jazzhus developed a concert series called Barnas Jazzcafé. Later the same year the international festival Kids in Jazz was established. These events brought a lot of attention to the concept, and Barnas Jazzhus was awarded Jazz Club of the Year in Norway in 2013.

Consequently, the concept was spread to several towns and venues in Norway, and also to other countries, including the clubs Hallstairs and Kamihikoki in Sapporo, and the club "Hey Joe" in Yokohama, Japan. In spring 2014 Barnas Jazzhus established a cooperation with Kampenjazz about the Norwegian celebration of UNESCO's International Jazz Day. Again kids from several countries got together to perform, and to develop musical friendships across borders. In August 2014, the founder of Barnas Jazzhus, Odd André Elveland, received the award Ella-prisen for his work with children and jazz.
