= Jarle Bernhoft =

Norwegian musician

Jarle Bernhoft Bern/hoft
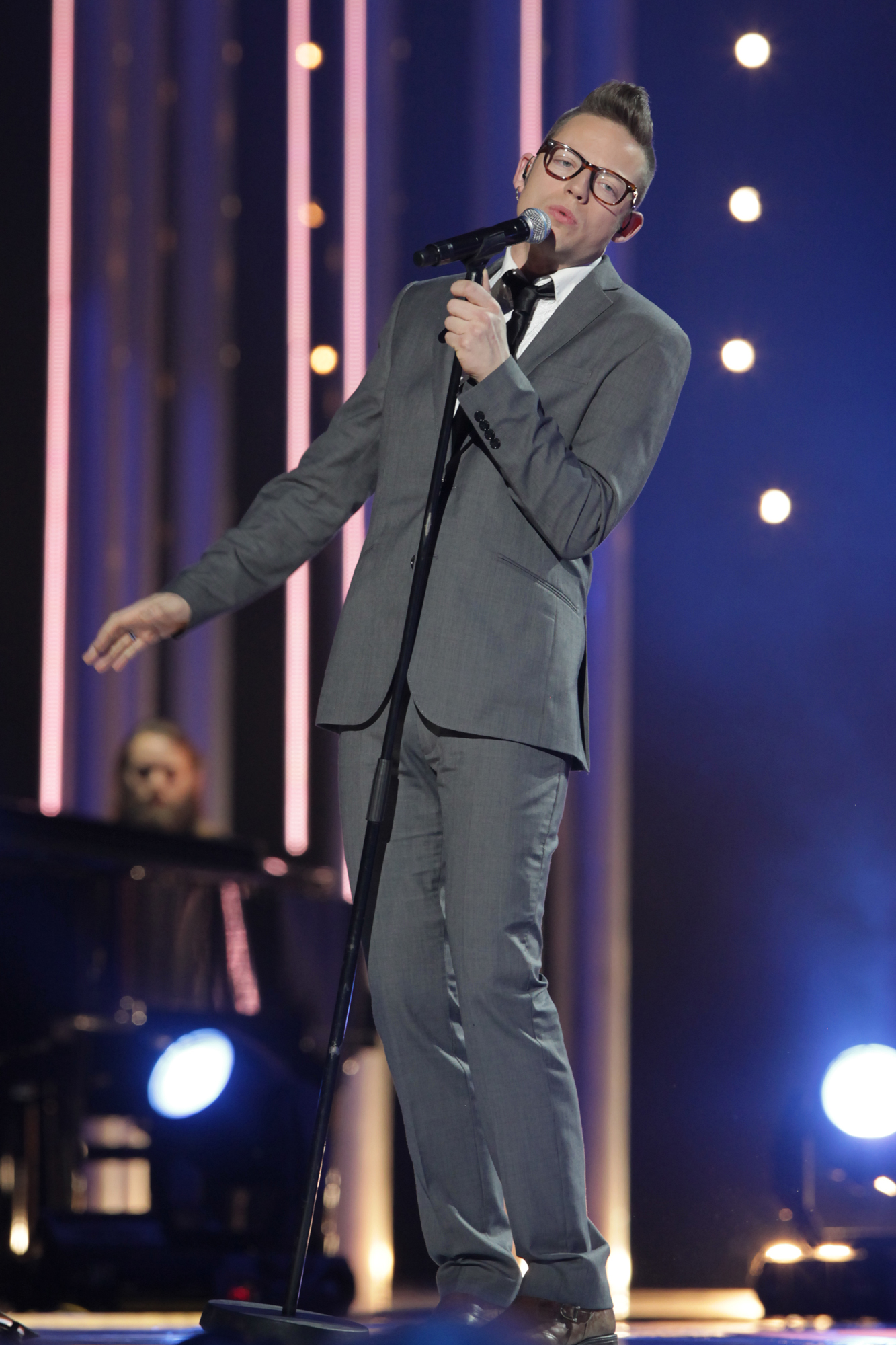
- Bernhoft at Nobel Prizes concert 2011

Background information
- Also known as: Bern/Hoft (solo work 2011 onwards); Rod Hot (in Green Granadas)
- Born: Jarle Norman Bernhoft-Sjødin; 21 June 1976 (age 50); Nittedal, Norway
- Occupations: Singer, musician, songwriter
- Years active: 2002–present
- Website: bernhoft.org

Jarle Bernhoft (Norwegian pronunciation: [ˈjɑ̀ːlə ˈbæ̀ɳhɔft]; né Jarle Norman Bernhoft-Sjødin; born 21 June 1976), known professionally as Bernhoft (often stylized as Bern/hoft), is a Norwegian singer, musician and songwriter. His best known songs are "Streetlights", "Shout" (a Tears for Fears cover), "Choices", "C'mon Talk" and "Stay with Me". He has also been in a number of bands, notably Explicit Lyrics and Span.

== Career ==
=== Explicit Lyrics ===
Hailing from Nittedal, Bernhoft attended Rud Upper Secondary School in Bærum where he joined the musical scene. Bernhoft, alongside Fridtjof "Joff" Nilsen, were members of Explicit Lyrics. Within a span of three years, the band released three albums, Fleshpulse (1996), Flow (1997) and Lipshave (1998).

=== Span ===
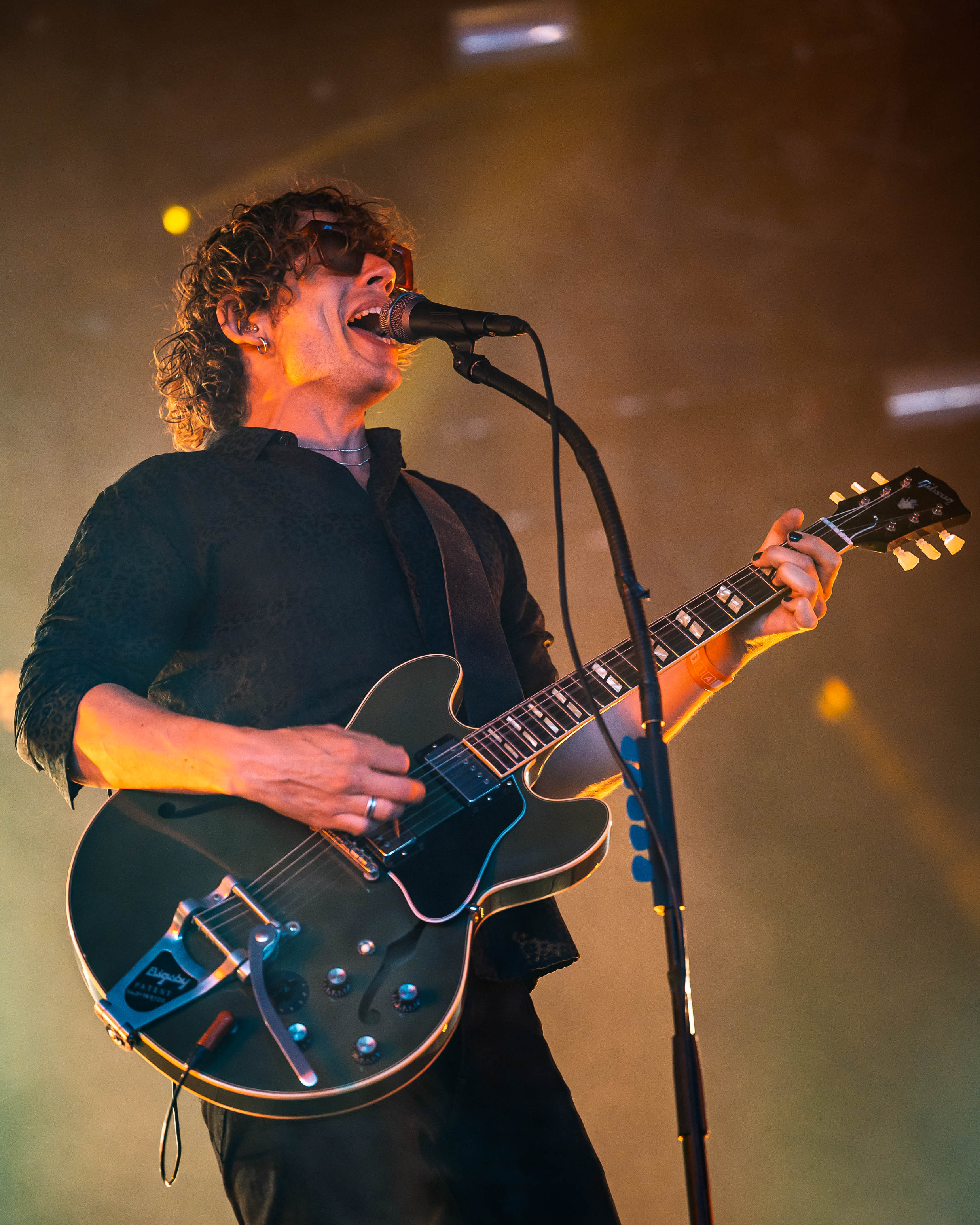
Bernhoft live with SPAN in 2024 Photo: Birgit Fostervold

After the breakup of Explicit Lyrics, Bernhoft, a vocalist and songwriter, and guitarist Nilsen, joined drummer Fredrik Wallumrød and bassist Vemund Stavnes to form the rock band Span. After two EPs, Baby's Come Back (2002) and Found (2003), Span had two successful albums, Mass Distraction (2004) and Vs. Time (2005). The band broke up in 2005. In late 2023, the band announced reunion shows at Rockefeller Music Hall in February 2024, twenty years after the release of their debut album.

=== Other collaborations ===
Bernhoft has contributed on a number of recordings and concerts with mostly Norwegian artists, such as Hanne Hukkelberg, Dadafon, Bigbang and The Køhn/Johansen Sextet.

He also played in the band Green Granadas using the stage name Rod Hot.

=== Solo ===
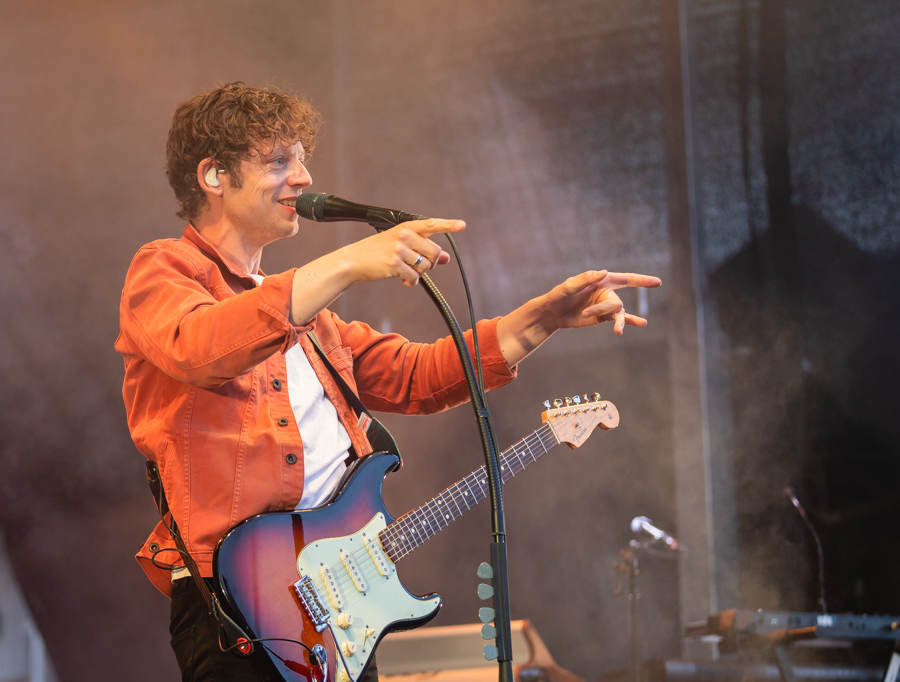
Bernhoft at Kongsberg Jazzfestival 2019 Photo: Tore Sætre

Bernhoft released his first solo album Ceramik City Chronicles on 1 September 2008. In January 2010, he released a double live album called 1:Man 2:Band, where one half is a recording from his solo show at a jazz café in Oslo (Kampen Bistro), and the other half is a recording from his concerts in Rockefeller and Molde Jazz Festival with a full band.

His second solo album, Solidarity Breaks, was released the next year in January 2011. It topped the VG-lista, the Norwegian Albums Chart, for a total of seven weeks (in July, August and September 2011). The album was credited to Bern/hoft rather than his full name. He was also credited as Bern/hoft in his 2014 follow-up album Islander that also topped the VG-lista chart in May 2014.

In June 2014, Bernhoft appeared for the first time at the Glastonbury Festival and was featured by BBC One in a special performance of his song "Wind You Up".

His album Islander was nominated for a Grammy Award for Best R&B Album for the 2015 Grammy Awards ceremony, held in February 2015.

== In popular culture ==
In September 2011, Bernhoft appeared on The Ellen DeGeneres Show after producers of the show found his video on YouTube. While on the show he played his song "C'mon Talk".

In July 2013 and again in June 2014, he was featured as a musical guest on Conan on TBS.

From 2023 to 2024, Bernhoft served as a coach on The Voice Norway, and returned after a one-season hiatus in 2026.

== Discography ==
=== Albums ===
With Explicit Lyrics

- 1996: Fleshpulse (EP)
- 1998: Lipshave

With Span

- 2004: Mass Distraction
- 2005: Vs. Time

With Børre Dalhaug's Bigbandblast

- 2004: Bigbandblast! (Real Records)

Solo (studio)

Year	Album	Credited to	Peak positions		
Year	Album	Credited to	NOR	DEN	FR
2008	Ceramik City Chronicles	Jarle Bernhoft	4	—	—
2011	Solidarity Breaks	Bern/Hoft	1	29	64
2014	Islander	Bern/Hoft	1	23	208
2016	Stop/Shutup/Shout It Out	Bern/Hoft	25	—	—
2017	The Morning Comes	Bern/Hoft	—	—	—
2018	Humanoid	Bern/Hoft & the Fashion Bruises	23	—	—
2021	Dancing on My Knees	Bern/Hoft	11	—	—
2023	Avenue of Loveless Hearts	Bern/Hoft	—	—	—

Solo (live)

Year	Album	Credited to	Peak positions
Year	Album	Credited to	NOR
2010	1:Man 2:Band (live double album)	Jarle Bernhoft	—
2011	Walk with Me (Live at Chateau Neuf)	Bern/Hoft	1

=== Singles ===
With Span

- 2002: "Baby's Come Back"
- 2002: "On My Way Down"
- 2003: "Found"
- 2004: "Don't Think the Way They Do"
- 2005: "Cut Like Diamonds"

Solo

- 2008: "Streetlights"
- 2008: "Sunday"
- 2009: "Fly Away"
- 2011: "C'mon Talk"
- 2011: "Choices"
- 2012: "Stay with Me"
- 2012: "Shout" (France: #187)
- 2014: "Come Around" (France: #181)
- 2015: "Everyone's A Stranger"
- 2016: "We Have a Dream"
- 2021: "Say It Isn't So"
- 2021: "C'mon Talk V2"
- 2021: "Call out Kids"
- 2021: "Clearly Confused"
- 2021: "All My Loving"

Awards
Preceded by Karpe Diem	Recipient of the Spellemannprisen as Spellemann of the Year; 2011	Succeeded by Kaizers Orchestra
Preceded by Gabrielle Leithaug	Recipient of the popular music Edvardprisen; 2015	Succeeded by Amund Maarud
