= Odd André Elveland =

Norwegian composer and jazz musician

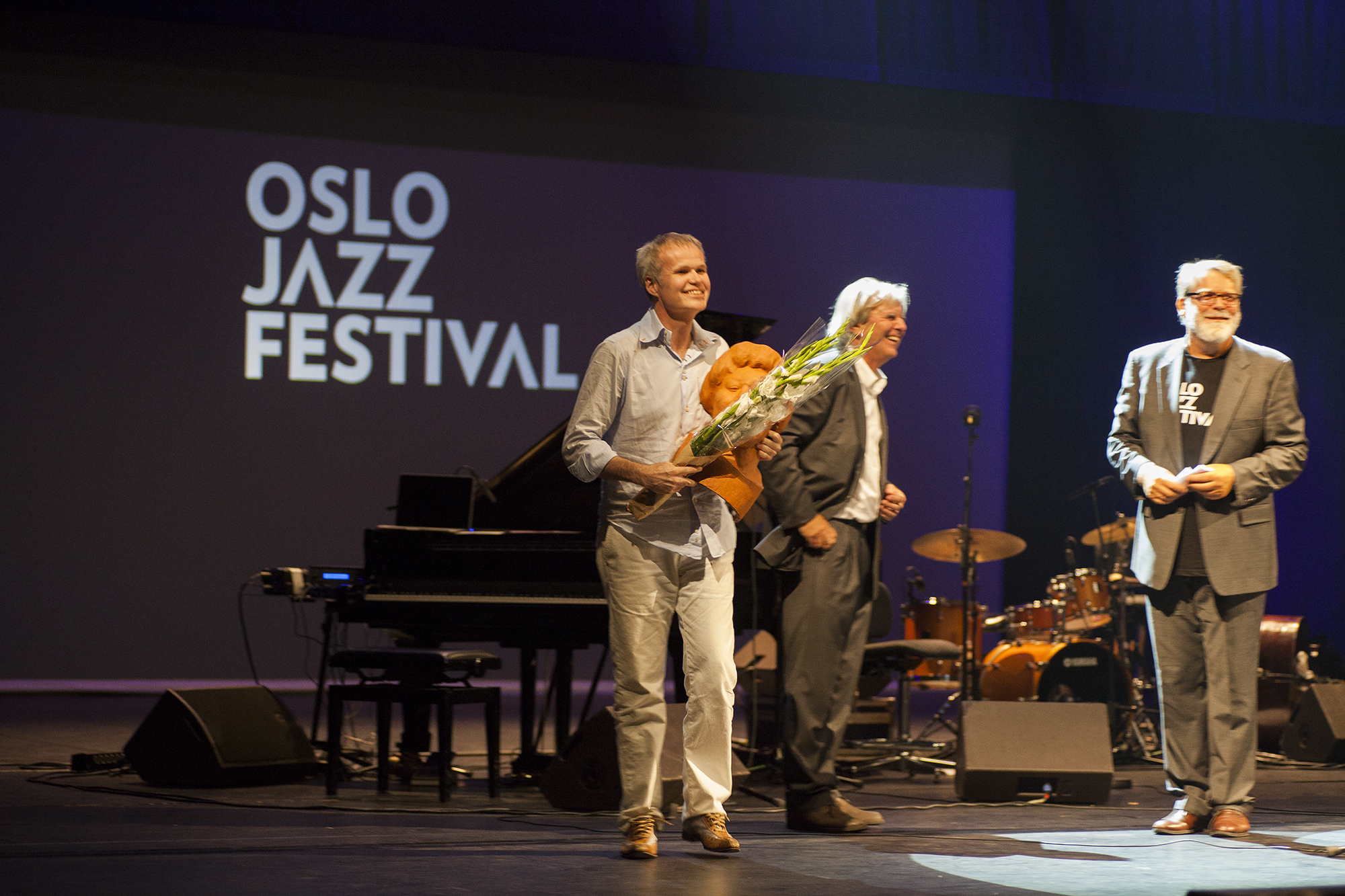
Odd André Elveland receives the award Ella-prisen 2014, for his work with children and jazz. (Photo by Asaki Abumi

Odd André Elveland (born 16 July 1965) is a Norwegian jazz musician (saxophone), composer, arranger and jazz teacher.

== Career ==
Elveland is educated on the jazz program at Norwegian University of Science and Technology (Trondheim Musikkonservatorium). As a performer he has toured in Norway with his own quartet with Håvard Wiik, Mats Eilertsen and Jarle Vespestad. He also has appeared with a trio with Ingebrigt Håker Flaten and Thomas Strønen.

He has recorded with Ditlef Eckhoff/Einar Iversen, The Sinatra Songbook (including solo performance with the Norwegian Radio Orchestra), The Swing Pack (Urban Breeze), Per Husby/Anne Lande and others.

== Projects ==
As a jazz teacher Elveland has developed a concept of teaching small children advanced jazz and improvised music. With the nationwide center Improbasen, he has engaged in educational projects in Norway, Sweden, Denmark, Switzerland, Austria and Japan.

He is in charge of the jazz club Barnas Jazzhus, which specializes in developing concepts where children can perform jazz. Barnas Jazzhus was awarded jazz club of the year in Norway in 2013. With the international festival Kids in Jazz, Odd André Elveland has brought young talents from Norway, Sweden, Denmark, Switzerland, Spain, Austria, Ukraine and Japan together, to play concerts and develop musical friendships. In 2014 he received the award Ella-prisen for his work with children and jazz.
