= 1979 in jazz =

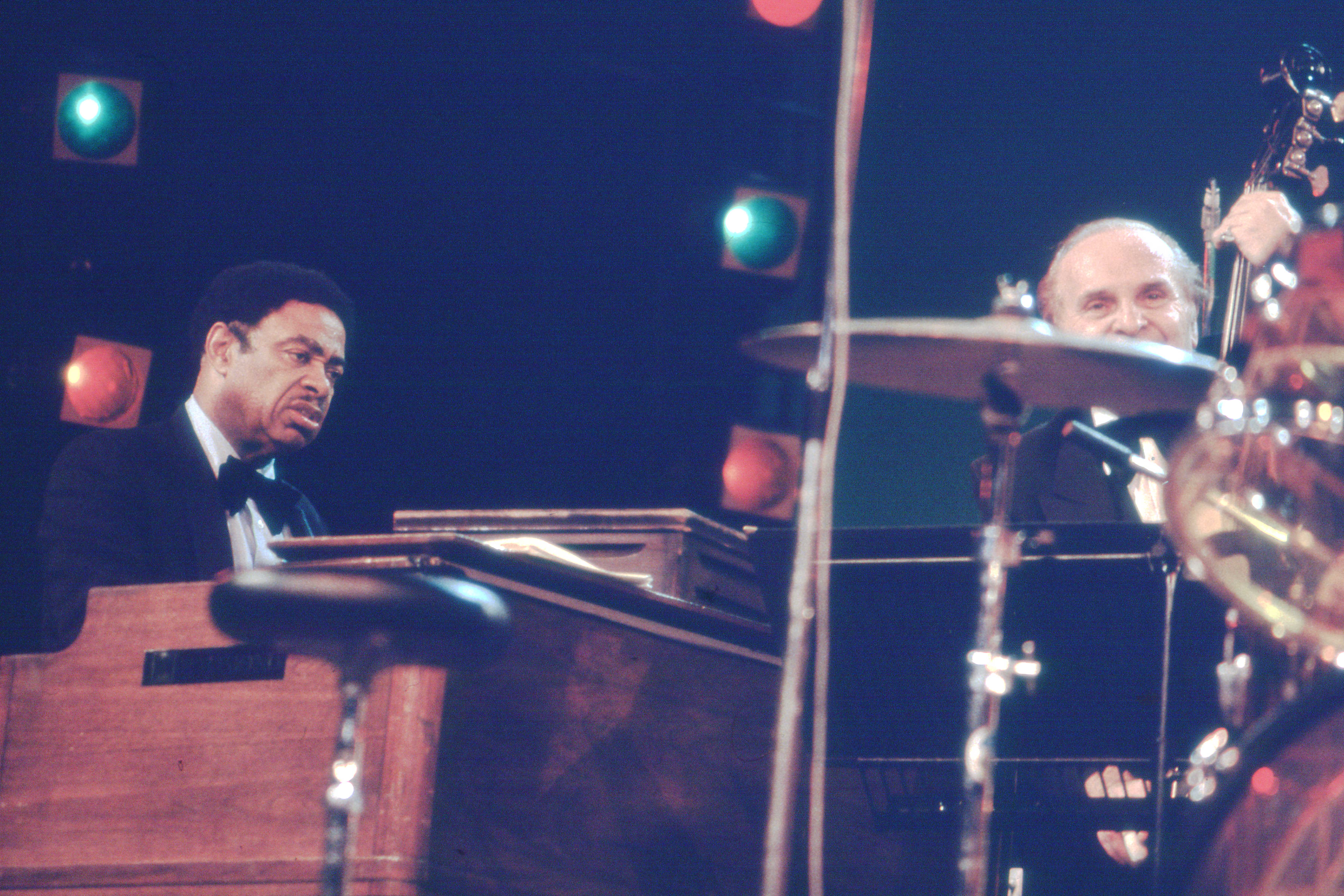
- Lionel Hampton, Wild Bill Davis, Chubby Jackson at the 1979 North Sea Jazz Festival.
- Decade: 1970s in jazz
- Music: 1979 in music
- Standards: List of post-1950 jazz standards
- See also: 1978 in jazz – 1980 in jazz

This is a timeline documenting events of Jazz in the year 1979.

== Events ==
=== March ===
- 3
  - At Havana Jam, in Havana, Cuba, the Saturday evening show on 3 March was launched by the CBS Jazz All-Stars, composed of Dexter Gordon, Stan Getz, Jimmy Heath, Arthur Blythe, Woody Shaw, Hubert Laws, Bobby Hutcherson, Willie Bobo, Cedar Walton, Percy Heath and Tony Williams.

=== April ===
- 6
  - The 6th Vossajazz started in Vossavangen, Norway (April 6–8).

=== May ===
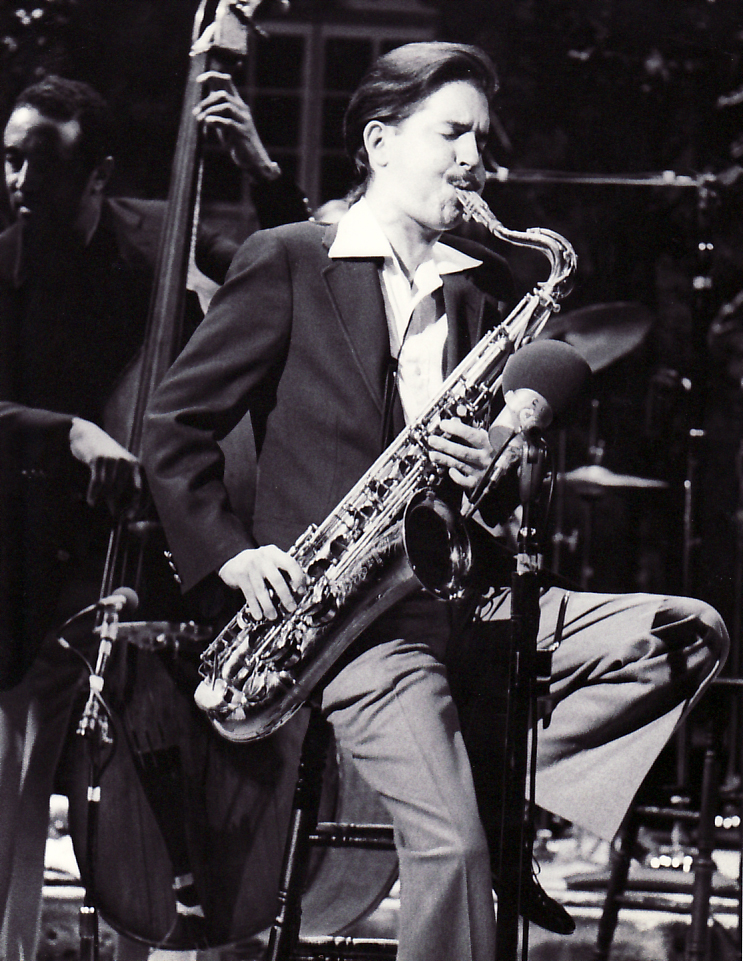
Scott Hamilton and Ray Brown at the 1979 Concord Jazz Festival

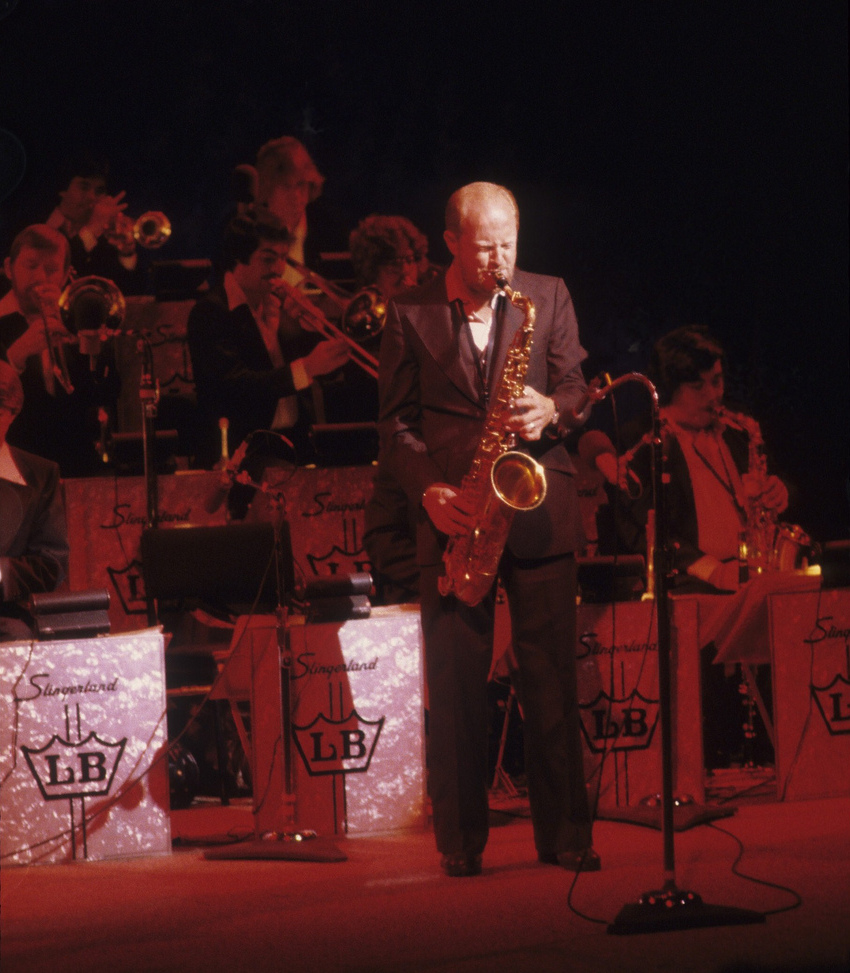
Don Menza with the Louie Bellson Orchestra at the 1979 Concord Jazz Festival

- 23
  - The 7th Nattjazz started in Bergen, Norway (May 23 – June 6).
- 25
  - The 13th Berkeley Jazz Festival started in Berkeley, California (May 25–27).
    - 1st day featured Al Jarreau, John Klemmer, Betty Carter, and Tony Williams Band
    - 2nd day featured Weather Report, Sonny Rollins, and Pat Metheny
    - 3rd day featured Dizzy Gillespie, Eddie Jefferson with Richie Cole, and A Special Tribute to Charles Mingus: Joni Mitchell, Jaco Pastorius, Don Alias, Herbie Hancock and Tony Williams.

=== June ===
- 1
  - The 8th Moers Festival started in Moers, Germany (June 1–4).
- 3
  - David Murray and the Sunny Murray Trio recorded Live at Moers Festival during this festival.
- 15
  - The 2nd Playboy Jazz Festival was held at the Hollywood Bowl in Los Angeles, with Bill Cosby as emcee.
- 22
  - The 26th Newport Jazz Festival started in Newport, Rhode Island (June 22 – July 1).

=== July ===
- 6
  - The very first Copenhagen Jazz Festival started in Copenhagen, Denmark (July 6–15).
  - The 13th Montreux Jazz Festival started in Montreux, Switzerland (July 6–24).
- 12
  - Ella Fitzgerald performed at Montreux, accompanied by the Count Basie Orchestra, and her performance was released as A Perfect Match.
- 13
  - The 4th North Sea Jazz Festival started in The Hague, Netherlands (July 13–15).
  - Beryl Bryden headlined the North Sea Jazz Festival with Rod Mason and His Hot Five, released on the album After Hours in 1980.
- 16
  - Oscar Peterson performed at Montreux, accompanied by Niels-Henning Ørsted Pedersen, released as the album Digital at Montreux.
- 21
  - The 10th Concord Jazz Festival started at Concord, California (July 21–23, 28–30).
    - The festival featured artists like Ray Brown, Scott Hamilton, Don Menza with The Louie Bellson Orchestra and Dave Brubeck. Brubeck records his 1979 album release Back Home at this festival.

=== September ===
- 14
  - The 22nd Monterey Jazz Festival started in Monterey, California (September 14–16).

=== Unknown date ===
- The headline act on Friday night of the Bracknell Jazz Festival was Rocket 88, a boogie-woogie big band including Rolling Stones drummer Charlie Watts and Ian Stewart the "6th Stone" on piano along with bassist Jack Bruce, the Norwegian Jan Garbarek Group, London r'n'b legend Alexis Korner and an array of British horn-players.
- Nambassa 1979 was the largest music event in New Zealand.
- All That Jazz is released, an American musical film directed by Bob Fosse.

== Album releases ==
- Herb Alpert: Rise
- Fred Anderson: Dark Day
- Billy Bang: Distinction Without a Difference
- Billy Bang: Sweet Space
- Dollar Brand: African Marketplace
- Anthony Braxton: Alto Saxophone Improvisations 1979
- Guenter Christmann: Weavers
- Crusaders: Street Life
- Andrew Cyrille: Nuba
- Lesli Dalaba: Trumpet Songs and Dances
- Anthony Davis: Hidden Voices
- Jack DeJohnette: Special Edition
- Al Di Meola: Splendido Hotel
- Michael Franks: Tiger in the Rain
- Bunky Green: Places We've Never Been
- Joseph Jarman: The Magic Triangle
- George Lewis: Homage to Charles Parker
- Jeff Lorber Fusion: Water Sign
- Paul Lytton: The Inclined Stick
- Pat Metheny: American Garage
- Paul Motian: Le Voyage
- Amina Claudine Myers: Song for Mother E
- James Newton: The Mystery School
- Old And New Dreams: Old and New Dreams
- Errol Parker: Doodles
- Niels-Henning Ørsted Pedersen: Dancing on the Tables
- Art Pepper: Straight Life
- Max Roach & Anthony Braxton: One in Two – Two in One
- Max Roach: Pictures in a Frame
- Rova Saxophone Quartet: The Removal of Secrecy
- Terje Rypdal: Descendre
- Joe Sample: Carmel
- Woody Shaw: Woody III
- Martial Solal: Four Keys
- Spyro Gyra: Morning Dance
- String Trio of New York: First String
- John Surman: Upon Reflection
- Ralph Towner: Solo Concert
- Warren Vaché: Polished Brass
- Weather Report: 8:30
- Eberhard Weber: Fluid Rustle
- Kenny Wheeler: Around 6

== Deaths ==
=== January ===
- 5
  - Charles Mingus, American upright bassist, composer and bandleader (born 1922).
- 13
  - Sabu Martinez, American conguero and percussionist (born 1930).
- 29
  - Sonny Payne, American drummer (born 1926).
- 31
  - Grant Green, American guitarist and composer (born 1935).

=== February ===
- 15
  - Zbigniew Seifert, Polish jazz violinist (born 1946).
- 22
  - Luděk Hulan, Czech upright bassist and musical organiser (born 1929).

=== March ===
- 25
  - Franco Manzecchi, Italian drummer (born 1931).
- 29
  - Ray Ventura, French bandleader and pianist (born 1908).

=== April ===
- 10
  - Gus Clark, Belgian pianist (born 1913).

=== May ===
- 9
  - Eddie Jefferson, American vocalist and lyricist (born 1918).
- 21
  - Blue Mitchell, American trumpeter (born 1930).

=== June ===
- 13
  - Demetrio Stratos, Greek-Italian lyricist and multi-instrumentalist (born 1945).

=== July ===
- 8
  - Charles Kynard, American organist (born 1933).
- 18
  - Matthew Gee, American bebop trombonist and part-time actor (born 1925).

=== August ===
- 24
  - Teddy Smith, American jazz upright bassist (born 1932).
- 25
  - Stan Kenton, American pianist and composer (born 1911).

=== September ===
- 9
  - Wilbur Ware, American upright bassist (born 1923).
- 19
  - John Simmons, American upright bassist (born 1918).
  - Lou Busch, American pianist, arranger and composer, a.k.a. Joe "Fingers" Carr (born 1910).

=== October ===
- 3
  - Corky Corcoran, American tenor saxophonist (born 1924).
- 8
  - David Izenzon, American upright bassist (born 1932).

=== November ===
- 23
  - Henry Coker, American trombonist (born 1919).

=== December ===
- 16
  - Vagif Mustafazadeh, Azerbaijani pianist and composer (born 1940).

== Births ==
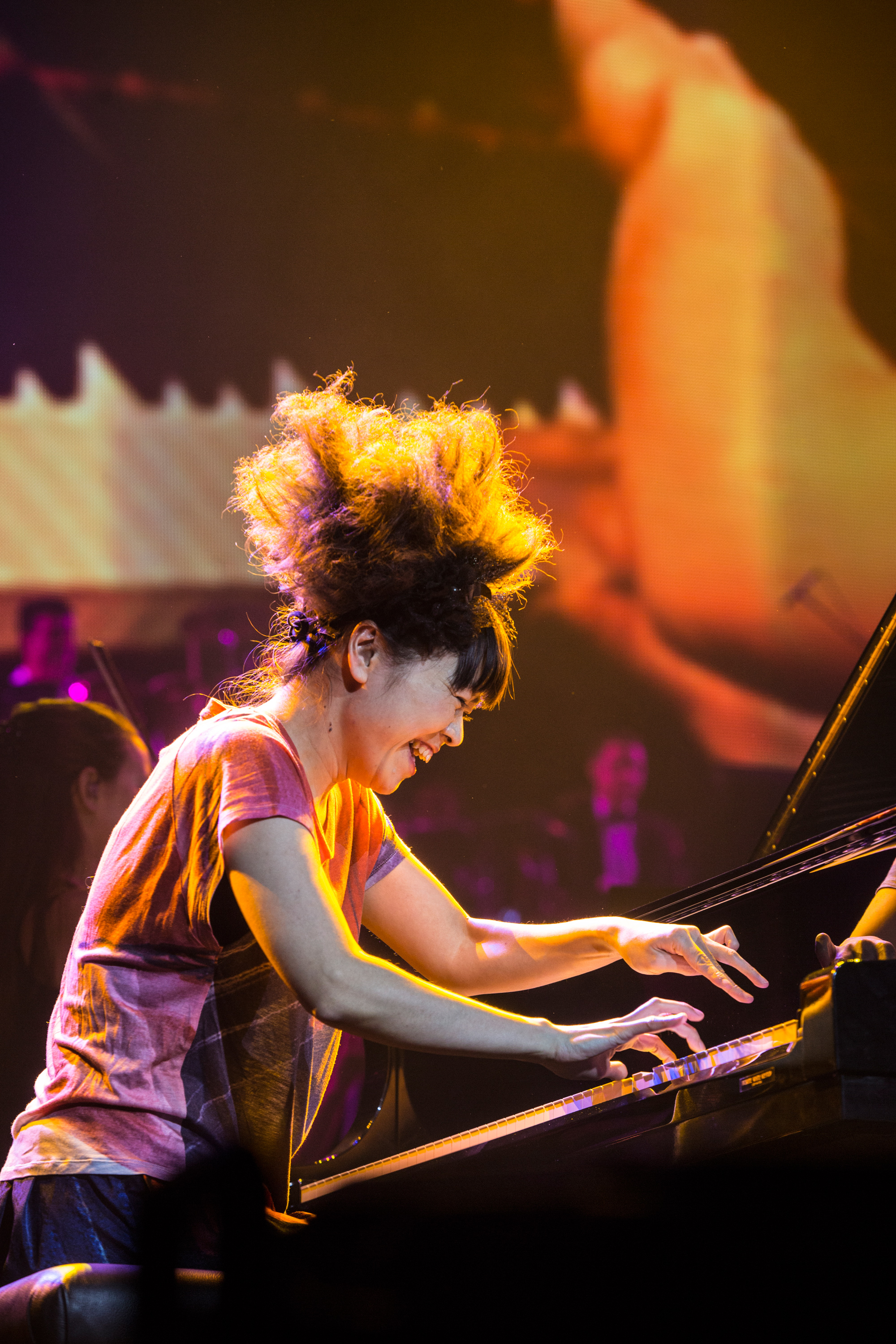
Hiromi Uehara 2013 in Frankfurt.

=== January ===
- 3
  - Susana Santos Silva, Portuguese trumpeter.
- 4
  - Audun Ellingsen, Norwegian upright bassist.
- 5
  - Kathleen Edwards, Canadian singer-songwriter, guitarist, and violinist.

=== March ===
- 4
  - Stein Urheim, Norwegian guitarist and composer.
- 12
  - Pascal Schumacher, Luxembourgian vibraphonist, percussionist, composer, and bandleader.
- 26
  - Hiromi Uehara, Japanese composer and pianist.
- 30
  - Norah Jones, American singer, pianist, songwriter, and actress.

=== April ===
- 2
  - Stian Westerhus, Norwegian guitarist, Puma.
- 20
  - Kenneth Kapstad, Norwegian drummer, Gåte and Grand General.
- 22
  - Edith WeUtonga, Zimbabwean singer and bass guitarist.
- 25
  - Anat Cohen, Israeli clarinetist, saxophonist, and bandleader.
- 30
  - Tuomo Prättälä, Finnish pianist, keyboarder, and composer.

=== May ===
- 3
  - Kudzai Sevenzo, Zimbabwean actress and singer.
- 8
  - Alf Wilhelm Lundberg, Norwegian guitarist, pianist, and composer.
  - Ole Morten Vågan, Norwegian upright bassist, Motif.
- 16
  - Hermund Nygård, Norwegian drummer and composer.
- 21

=== June ===
- 3
  - Corey Wilkes, American trumpeter.
- 23
  - Susanna Wallumrød, Norwegian vocalist, Susanna and the Magical Orchestra.
- 26
  - Mathias Eick, Norwegian trumpeter and multi-instrumentalist, Jaga Jazzist and Music for a While.

=== July ===
- 24
  - Heidi Skjerve, Norwegian singer and composer.
- 26
  - Derek Paravicini, English blind autistic savant and musical prodigy.

=== August ===
- 1
  - Bjørn Vidar Solli, Norwegian guitarist, vocalist, and composer.
- 10
  - Ove Alexander Billington, Norwegian pianist and composer, Jaga Jazzist and Puma.
- 20
  - Jamie Cullum, British singer/songwriter, pianist, radio personality.
- 28
  - Jon Fält, Swedish drummer.

=== December ===
- 5
  - Ilmari Pohjola, Finnish trombonist.
- 10
  - Tora Augestad, Norwegian singer and actor, Music for a While.
- 20
  - Benedikte Shetelig Kruse, Norwegian singer and actor, Pitsj.
- 31
  - Anat Cohen, Israeli clarinetist, saxophonist, and bandleader.

=== Unknown date ===
- Espen Reinertsen, Norwegian saxophonist, flutist, and composer.
- Kristor Brødsgaard, Danish upright bassist, JazzKamikaze.
- Leo Genovese, Argentine pianist, keyboardist, and composer.

== See also ==
- 1970s in jazz
- List of years in jazz
- 1979 in music
