= Roger Arntzen =

Norwegian jazz bassist

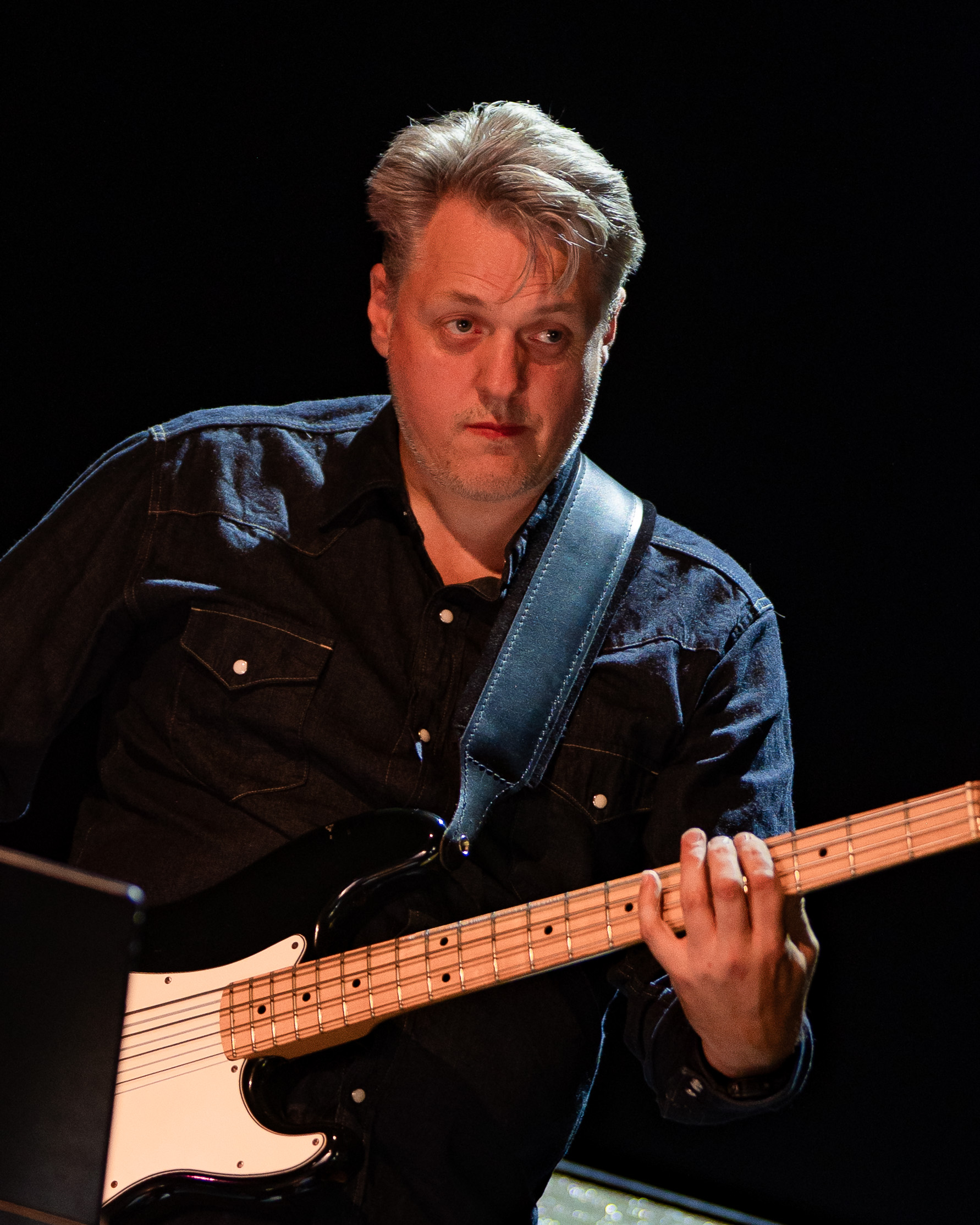
- Roger Arntzen (2025)

Background information
- Born: 3 June 1976 (age 49); Bodø, Nordland, Norway
- Genres: Jazz
- Occupations: Musician, composer
- Instrument: Upright bass
- Labels: Bolage; Hubro; Rune Grammofon; ACT; Grappa; Clean Feed Records; Jazzland Recordings
- Website: rogerarntzen.com

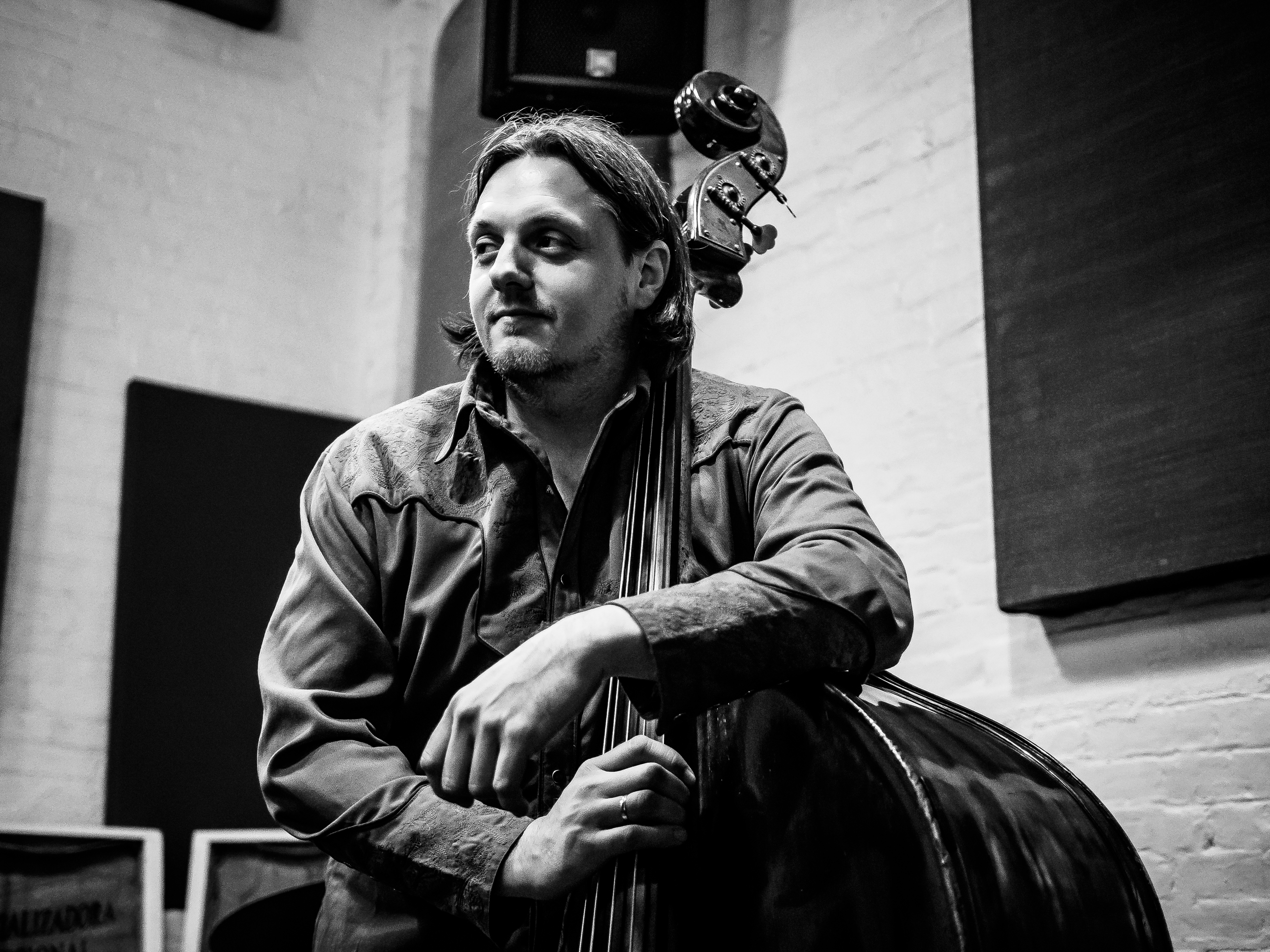
Roger Arntzen Oktober 2010

Roger Arntzen (born 3 June 1976) is a Norwegian jazz bassist, known from playing in bands like In the Country (trio), In the Country with Knut Reiersrud and Solveig Slettahjell, Ballrogg, Chrome Hill, One Small Step, John-Kåre Hansen Northern Concept, Ellen Sofie Hovland trio and previously also with Håvard Stubø Trio and the band Østenfor Sol. Through his projects he has worked with downtown NYC icon Marc Ribot, Bob Hoffnar, Josh Abrams, Toto Alvarez, BJ Cole, Michiyo Yagi, Tamaya Honda, Noritaka Tanaka, Tetuzi Akiyama, Neil Metcalfe, Terry Day, John Russell, Frode Grytten, Susanna Wallumrød, Frida Ånnevik, Tore Brunborg, Stian Carstensen, Bugge Wesseltoft, Mathias Eick, Odd Riisnæs, Lars Klevstrand, Moddi, Thomas Dybdahl, Steinar Ofsdal, Kari Svendsen, Jon Arne Corell, Alf Cranner, Göran Fristorp among others.

== Career ==
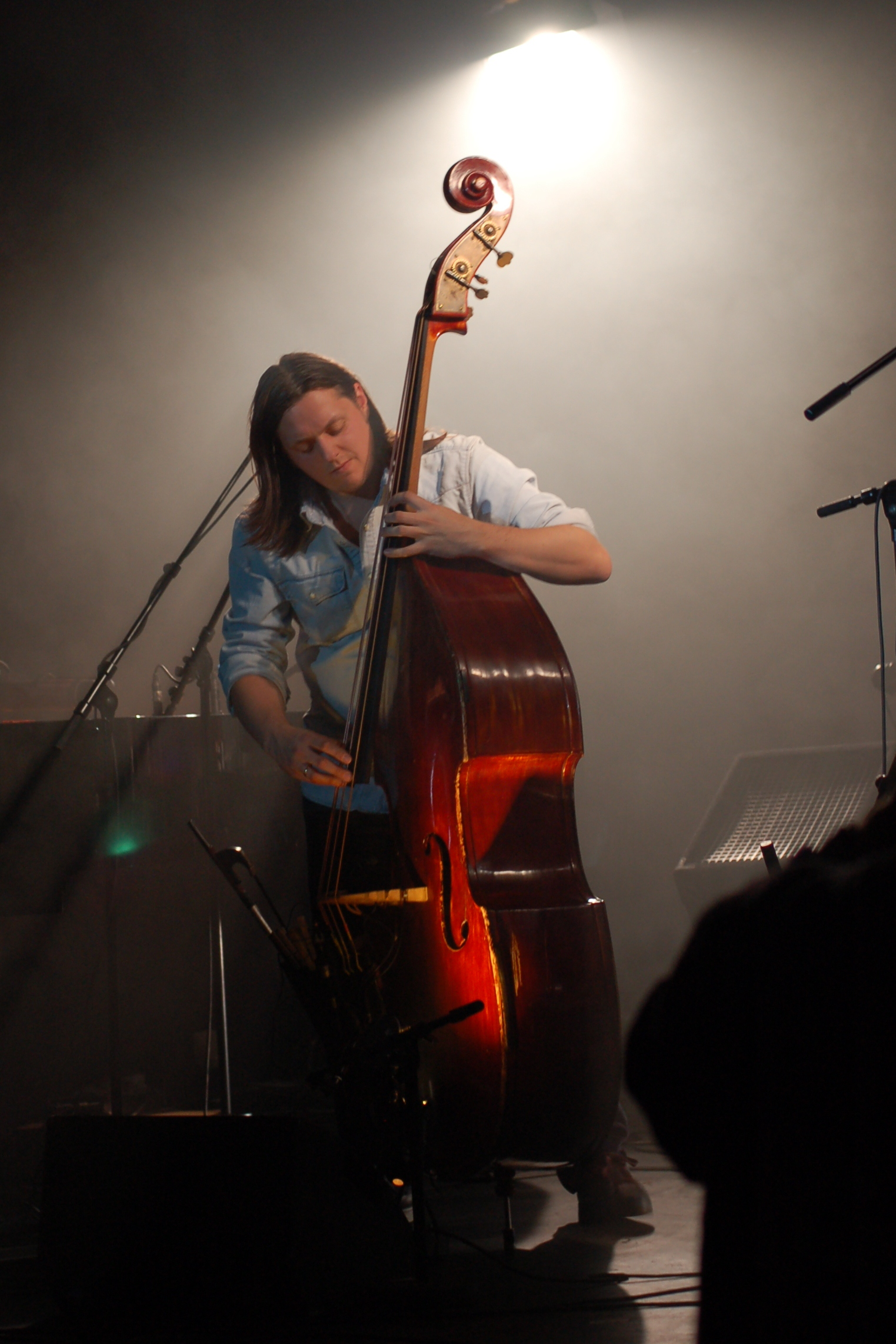
Roger Arntzen and In The Country

Roger Arntzen was born in Bodø, Norway. He picked up playing the accordion at five years of age, changing instrument to the tuba when he was at high school. Later he switched to electric guitar bass, before he eventually landed as an upright bass player. He attended musical studies at the University of Oslo (1998–99) and at the Norwegian Academy of Music in Oslo (1998–2006), where he took his masters degree in performance with his fellow band colleagues in the piano trio In the Country.

Arntzen has been involved in different bands such as Østenfor Sol, and is now part of bands like the piano trio In the Country accompanied by the pianist and keyboarder Morten Qvenild and the drummer Pål Hausken. In the Country has been active since 2003, releasing nine well received albums, This Was The Pace Of My Heartbeat (2004), Losing Stones (2006), Collecting Bones (2006), Whiteout (2009) with Andreas Mjøs, Sounds And Sights (2011) with Andreas Mjøs, Sunset Sunrise (2013), Norwegian Woods (2014) and Trail of Souls (2015) with Knut Reiersrud, Solveig Slettahjell, Bugge Wesseltoft, Skogenes Song (2014) with Frida Ånnevik. He has also released the live-DVD abc (2010) and the EP Thomas Dybdahl & In the Country (2015) with Thomas Dybdahl. In the Country was awarded "Young Jazz Musicians Of The Year 2004" in Norway and Down Beat called their debut album "one of the finest and most arresting albums to come out of Europe" that year, while All About Jazz reviewer John Kelman has suggested Whiteout as a contender for the "best of" list for 2009.

== Honors ==
- 2004: «JazzIntro» Newcomer Awarded as part of In the Country at Moldejazz, awarded by Rikskonsertene and Norsk Jazzforum

== Diskography (main projects) ==
=== Ballrogg ===
- 2008: Ballrogg (Bolage)
- 2010: Insomnia (Bolage)
- 2012: Cabin Music (Hubro)
- 2017: Abaft the Beam (Clean Feed Records)
- 2020: Rolling Ball (Clean Feed Records)

=== Damp ===
- 2003: Mostly Harmless (Songs) (AIM Records)
- 2005: Hoatzin (AIM Records)

=== Chrome Hill (previously known as Damp) ===
- 2008: Earthlings (Bolage)
- 2013: Country Of Lost Borders (Clean Feed Records)
- 2018: The Explorer (Clean Feed Records)
- 2020: This is Chrome Hill (Clean Feed Records)
- 2023: Chrome Hill Duo meets Dōjō: Live at Aketa No Mise (Clean Feed Records)
- 2025: En Route (Clean Feed Records)

=== Ellen Sofie Hovland ===
- 2024: Hva med det i midten? (Kirkelig kulturverksted)

=== In the Country ===
- 2005: This Was The Pace Of My Heartbeat (Rune Grammofon)
- 2006: Losing Stones, Collecting Bones (Rune Grammofon)
- 2009: Whiteout (Rune Grammofon)
- 2010: abc (itc), live-DVD
- 2011: Sounds And Sights (Rune Grammofon), live album including a DVD
- 2013: Sunset Sunrise (ACT)
- 2014: Skogenes Sang (Grappa), with Frida Ånnevik
- 2014: Norwegian Woods (ACT)
- 2015: Thomas Dybdahl & In the Country (Petroleum Records), EP
- 2015: Trail Of Souls (ACT)
- 2017: I Sentrum står et menneske (Akersbakken), samleplate
- 2025: Remembrance (Jazzland Recordings)

=== Northern Concept ===
- 2027: January Insomnia (Ponca Jazz Records)
- 2013: Days (Ponca Jazz Records)

=== One Small Step ===
- 2022: Gol Variations (Clean Feed Records)
- 2023: Chair Variations (one track on Janne Erakers double album Movement for Listening (Esc. Rec)

=== Subtonic ===
- 2004: In This House (AIM Records)

== Discography (side projects) ==
LAMIEE .* / Dròlo Ensemble)

- 2022: The Deafening Moment Of The Whistle After The Noise (Shhpuma)

=== Judy Collins (with Thomas Dybdahl/In the Country) ===
- 2015: Strangers Again (Cleopatra/Wildflower)

=== Erik Wesseltoft ===
- 2013: To Someone I Knew (Normann Records)

=== Ida Rønshaugen ===
- 2013: The Blue And The Wise Cats (Codfather Records)

=== Heidi Skjerve Quintet ===
- 2006: Coming Home (Curling Legs)

=== Jeremy Spencer ===
- 2006: Precious Little (Bluestown Records)

=== Gunstein Draugedalen ===
- 2003: Om hundrede år er alting glemt (Tylden)

=== Eckhard Baur ===
- 2001: Movements (Hot Club Records)

=== Østenfor Sol ===
- 2001: Troillspel (Major Studio)

=== Nordnorsk ungdomsstorband ===
- 2001: Distant Reports (Gemini Records)

=== Lilleaker skolekorps ===
- 1999: 90 år - 1909-1999 (Lilleaker skolekorps)

=== Hans Majestet Kongens Gardes musikkorps ===
- 1996: Gardekonsert (Hans Majestet Kongens Gardes musikkorps)
