= Lerheim =

Lerheim is a Norwegian surname. Notable people with the surname include:

- Asbjørn Lerheim (born 1977), Norwegian jazz guitarist and music educator
- Magne Lerheim (1929–1994), Norwegian politician
