= Pål Hausken =

Norwegian jazz musician (born 1980)

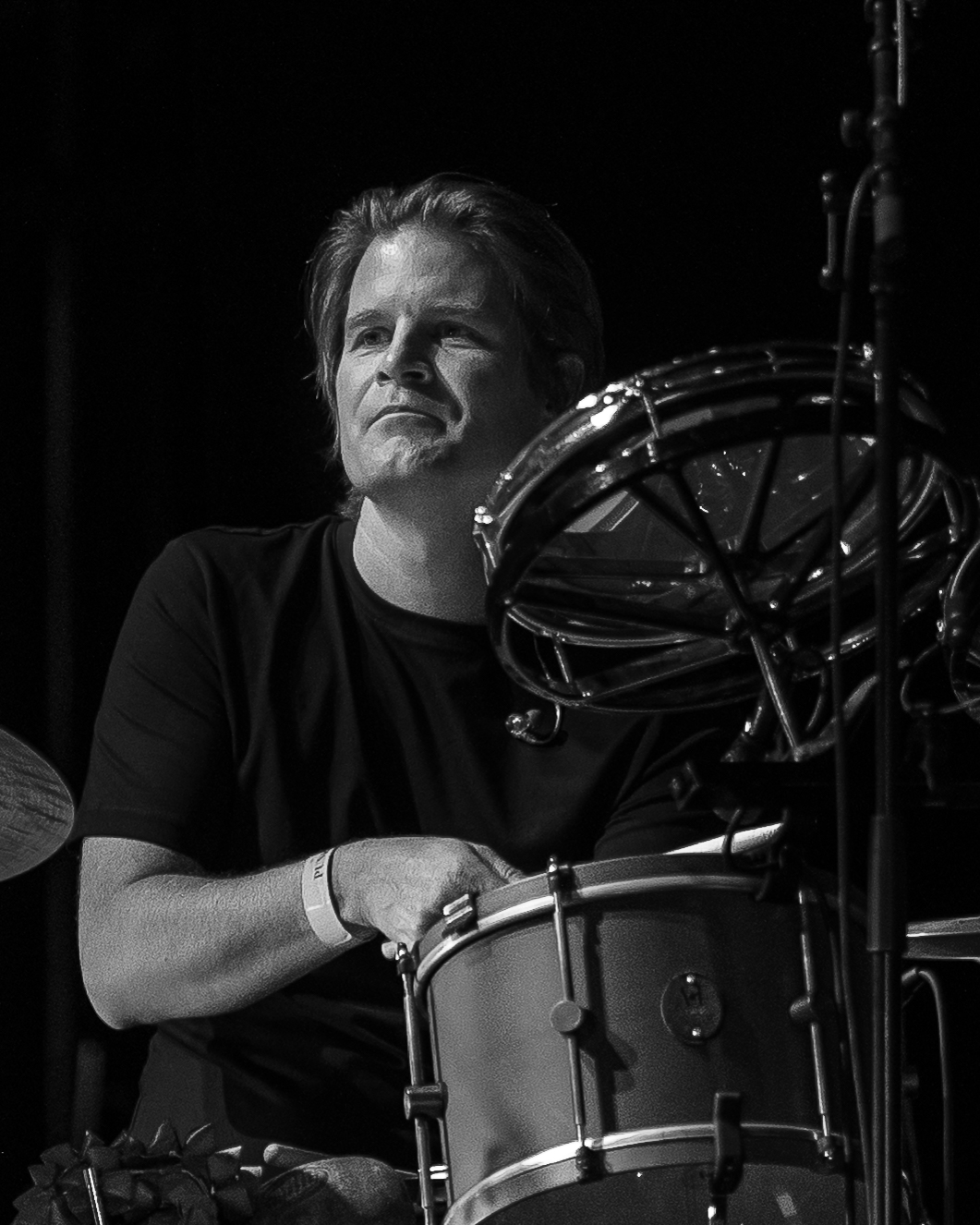
- Pål Hausken at Punktfestivalen 2025

Background information
- Born: 25 August 1980 (age 45); Rennesøy Municipality, Rogaland
- Origin: Norway
- Genres: Jazz
- Occupations: Musician, composer
- Instruments: Drums, percussion
- Website: www.groove.no/artist/74567871

Pål Hausken (born 25 August 1980 in Rennesøy Municipality, Norway) is a Norwegian jazz musician (drums and percussion), most known from bands like the jazz trio In The Country where he plays together with Morten Qvenild and Roger Arntzen, but also for his collaboration with artists like Susanna Wallumrød, Bull of the Year, Zahl and Music for a While together with Tora Augestad.

== Career ==
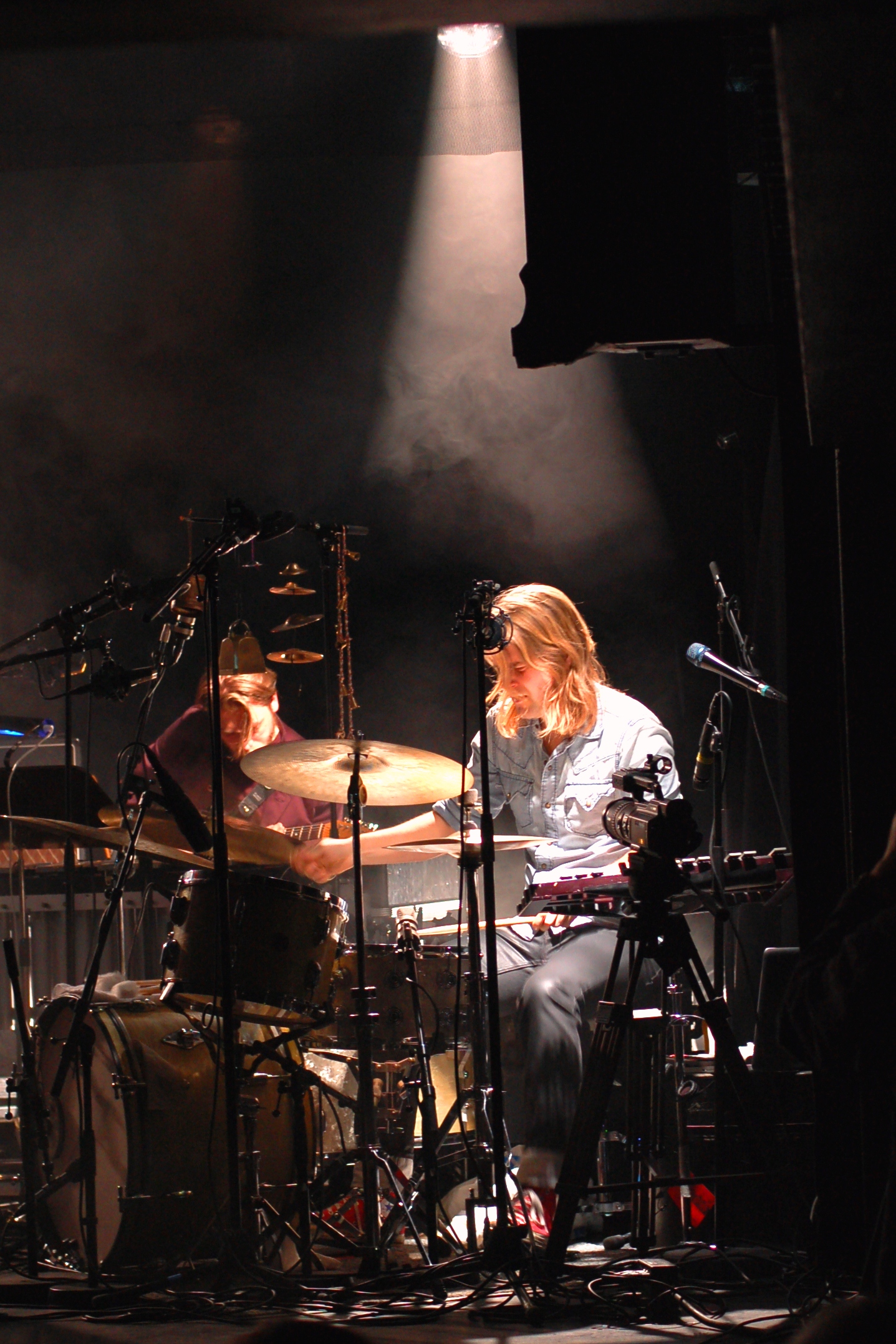
Pål Hausken and In The Country (Photo by Thomas Bjørndahl)

Hausken was a music student at the Norwegian Academy of Music when he together with fellow students Morten Qvenild and Roger Arntzen initiated the band In The Country. Here he play a central role as drummer and with five releases this is the most productive of his projects. At the Umea Jazz Festival 2012 they received brilliant critiques and followed up with the fifth album Sunset Sunrise in 2013.

== Honors ==
- 2004: Jazzintro Newcomer Award at Moldejazz, with in the Country
- 2012: "Independent Music Awards" with in the Country, for their latest full length art concert film

== Discography ==
=== Central projects ===
In The Country

- 2005: This Was The Pace of My Heartbeat (Rune Grammofon)
- 2006: Losing Stones, Collecting Bones (Rune Grammofon)
- 2009: Whiteout (Rune Grammofon)
- 2011: Sounds And Sights (Rune Grammofon)
- 2013: Sunset Sunrise (ATC)

Susanna Wallumrød

- 2007: Sonata Mix Dwarf Cosmos (Rune Grammofon)
- 2008: Flower of Evil (Rune Grammofon)

Zahl

- 2007: Nice for a Change (Kaizerecords)

Music for a While

- 2007: Weill Variations (Grappa)
- 2012: Graces That Refrain (Grappa)

Bull of the year

- 2009: Four Horns (AIM Sound City)

=== Other projects ===
Hilde Marie Kjersem TUB Quartet

- 2004: Red Shoes Diary (Curling Legs)

Kaada

- 2004: MECD (Warner Music, Norway)

Gebhardt & Mjøs

- 2005: Alt For Norge (Apache Records)

Christer Knutsen

- 2005: Would You Please Welcome (Frode Records)
- 2006: Grand Hotel (Frode Records)

With Tora Augestad's Music for a While including Mathias Eick, Stian Carstensen and Martin Taxt

- 2007: Weill Variations (Grappa Music)
- 2012: Graces That Refrain (Grappa Music)
- 2014: Canticles of Winter (Grappa Music)

Randi Tytingvåg

- 2012: Grounding (Ozella Records)

Finland including with Morten Qvenild, Jo Berger Myhre, Ivar Grydeland

- 2015: Rainy Omen (Hubro Music)
