= Ivar Anton Waagaard =

Norwegian pianist (born 1955)

- Born: Ivar Anton Beinset Waagaard; 3 September 1955 (age 70); Oslo
- Origin: Norway
- Genres: Contemporary, classical music
- Occupation: Musician
- Instrument: Piano

Ivar Anton Waagaard (born 3 September 1955) is a Norwegian pianist. He has collaborated with several Norwegian artists like Sigmund Groven, Ole Edvard Antonsen, Arve Tellefsen, Truls Mørk, Aage Kvalbein, Solveig Kringlebotn, Randi Stene, Aage Kvalbein, Tora Augestad, Jannike Kruse, Silje Nergaard, Jonas Fjeld and Lars Klevstrand.

== Career ==
Waagaard is an associate professor at the Norwegian Academy of Music. He has toured in the United States, several European countries and all over Norway, together with singers like Solveig Kringlebotn, Anne Lise Berntsen and the harmonica player Sigmund Groven. He has several appearances on festivals like Festspillene i Bergen, Nordlysfestivalen, Oslo kammermusikkfestival', 'Vestfoldfestspillene', 'Vinterfestspillene på Røros', 'Olavsfestdagene', 'Kristiansund operafestuke', 'Trondheim kammermusikkfestival', 'Festspillene i Harstad' and 'Nordland musikkfestuke'.

He has given recitals with the likes of Ole Edvard Antonsen, Arve Tellefsen, Truls Mørk, Aage Kvalbein, Randi Stene, Elisabeth Nordberg Schulz, Per Vollestad, Isa Gericke, Aage Kvalbein, and participated in hundreds of radio and TV programs, dozens of album recordings and has recorded music for film, radio drama and TV theater. He has been orchestral pianist several times within 'KORK'. In the period 1995-2007 Waagaard was regular accompanist at the Queen Sonja International Music Competition, and has been accompanist at the 'Statens Operahøyskole', 'Statens Teaterhøyskole' and 'Den norske Opera' in Norway.

Together with Svein Bjørkøy he released the album Sanger av Øistein Sommerfeldt in 2004, and the successor David Monrad Johansen - Samtlige sanger in 2007. Together with Tora Augestad he released the album Over the Piano - American Cabaret Songs in 2010.

== Discography ==
=== Solo albums ===
- 2011: Gershwin at the Keyboard (Lawo Classics)

=== Collaborations ===
With Rita Engebretsen and Helge Borglund

- 1976: Frem Fra Glemselen Kap. 4 (Kjente Viser Fra En Svunnen Tid) (Talent)

With Sidsel Endresen and Jonas Fjeld

- 1988: Etterlatte Sanger (Curling Legs)

With Sigmund Groven

- 1991: Nattønsker (Sonet Records)
- 2012: Classical Harmonica (Grappa Music)

With Maj Britt Andersen

- 1992: Kjærtegn (Norsk Plateproduksjon)
- 1994: Rippel Rappel (Grappa Music)

With Helge Iberg

- 1991: Halvveis (Curling Legs), lyrics by Rolf Jacobsen
- 2007: ReHumaniZing (Aurora)

With Silje Nergaard

- 1995: Brevet (Kirkelig Kulturverksted)

With Svein Bjørkøy

- 2004: Sanger av Øistein Sommerfeldt
- 2007: David Monrad Johansen - Samtlige sanger

Within 'Augestad & Waagaard Duo'

- 2010: Over The Piano: American Cabaret Songs (Norway Music)

With Jorunn Marie Bratlie

- 2011: Norsk Musikk For To Klaver (Bergen Digital)
