= In the Country =

Norwegian jazz band

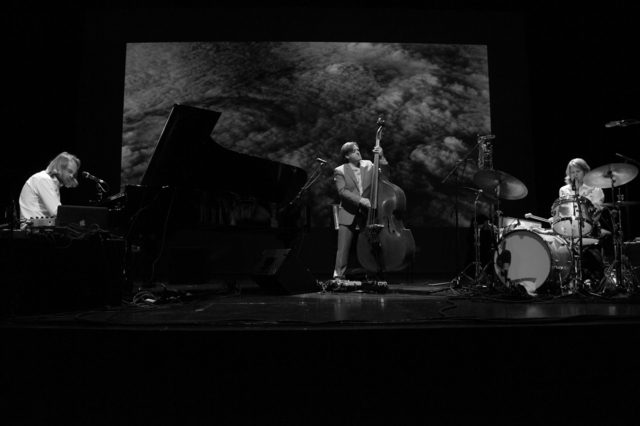
- In The Country live at a Jazz Festival in Ljubljana, Slovenia, 3 July 2014.

Background information
- Origin: Oslo, Norway
- Genre: Jazz
- Years active: 2003–present
- Label: Rune Grammofon
- Members: Morten Qvenild; Roger Arntzen; Pål Hausken
- Website: www.inthecountry.no

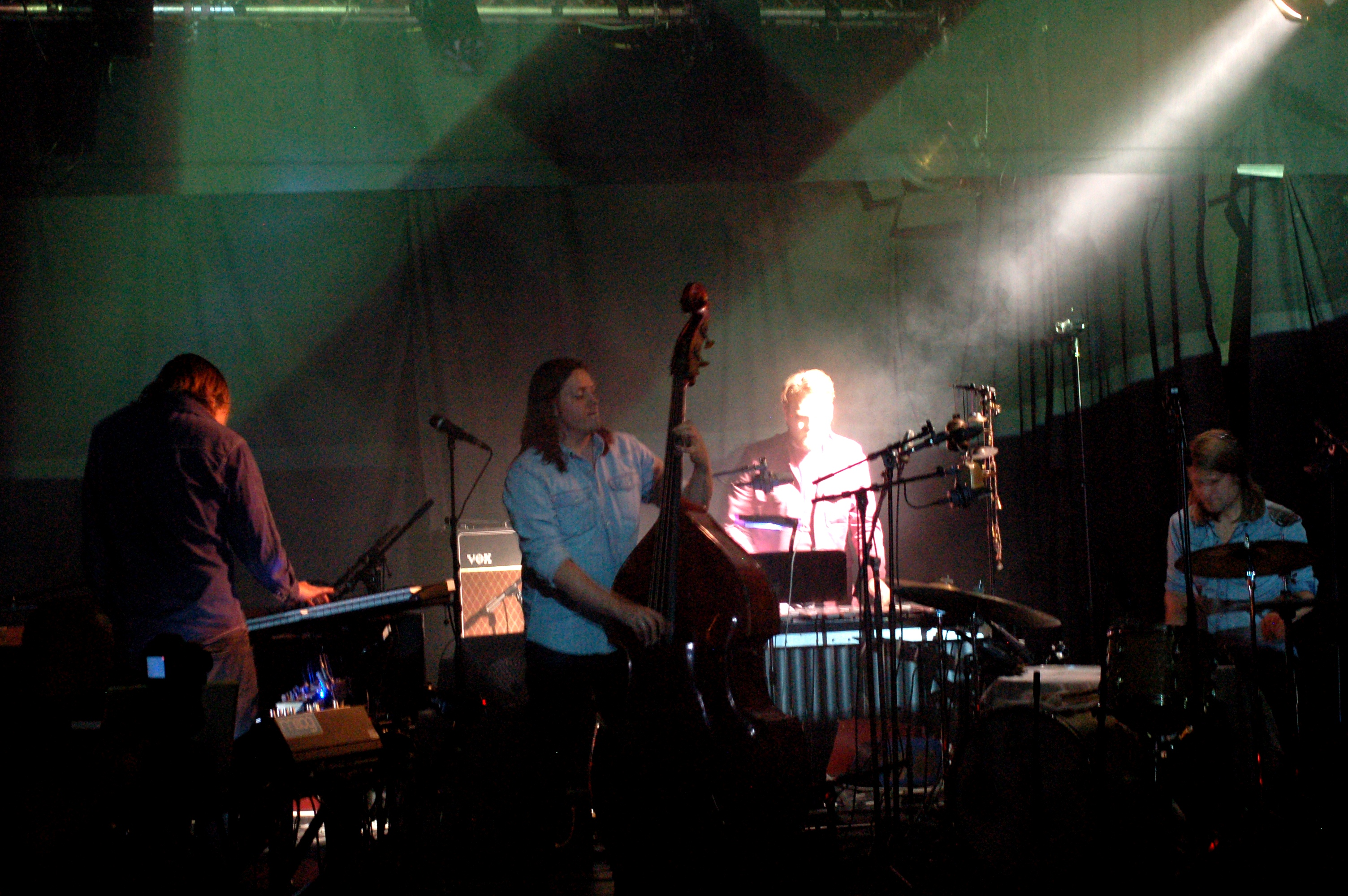
In The Country during a gig at EnergiMølla, Kongsberg, Norway, 13 October 2010.

In the Country (initiated in 2003 in Oslo, Norway) is a Norwegian Jazz trio comprising pianist Morten Qvenild, bassist Roger Arntzen and drummer Pål Hausken.

== Biography ==
The band was started by the three fellow students at the Norwegian Academy of Music in 2003. The year after they earned the "JazzIntro" Newcomer Award at Moldejazz (2004), and released their first album This Was The Pace of My Heartbeat (2004). The third album Without (2009) was named as "one of 2009's best jazz albums" by the All About Jazz reviewer John Kelman. In the autumn of 2010, the band was on tour with vibraphonist and guitarist Andreas Mjøs under the auspices of Rikskonsertene, while in June 2011 they were on the fourth USA tour. At the same time, they released their fourth album "Sounds and Sights" to acclaimed reviews.

== Band members ==
- Morten Qvenild (piano)
- Roger Arntzen (bass)
- Pål Hausken (drums)

== Honors ==
- 2004: "JazzIntro" Newcomer Awarded at Moldejazz, by Rikskonsertene and Norsk Jazzforum

== Discography ==
- 2004: This Was The Pace of My Heartbeat (Rune Grammofon)
- 2006: Losing Stones, Collecting Bones (Rune Grammofon)
- 2009: Whiteout (Rune Grammofon)
- 2011: Sounds And Sights (Rune Grammofon), live album including a DVD
- 2013: Sunset Sunrise (ACT)
- 2014: Skogenes Sang (Grappa Music), with Frida Ånnevik
- 2015: Trail of Souls (ACT), with Solveig Slettahjell and Knut Reiersrud
