= Lisa Dillan =

Norwegian jazz vocalist (born 1969)

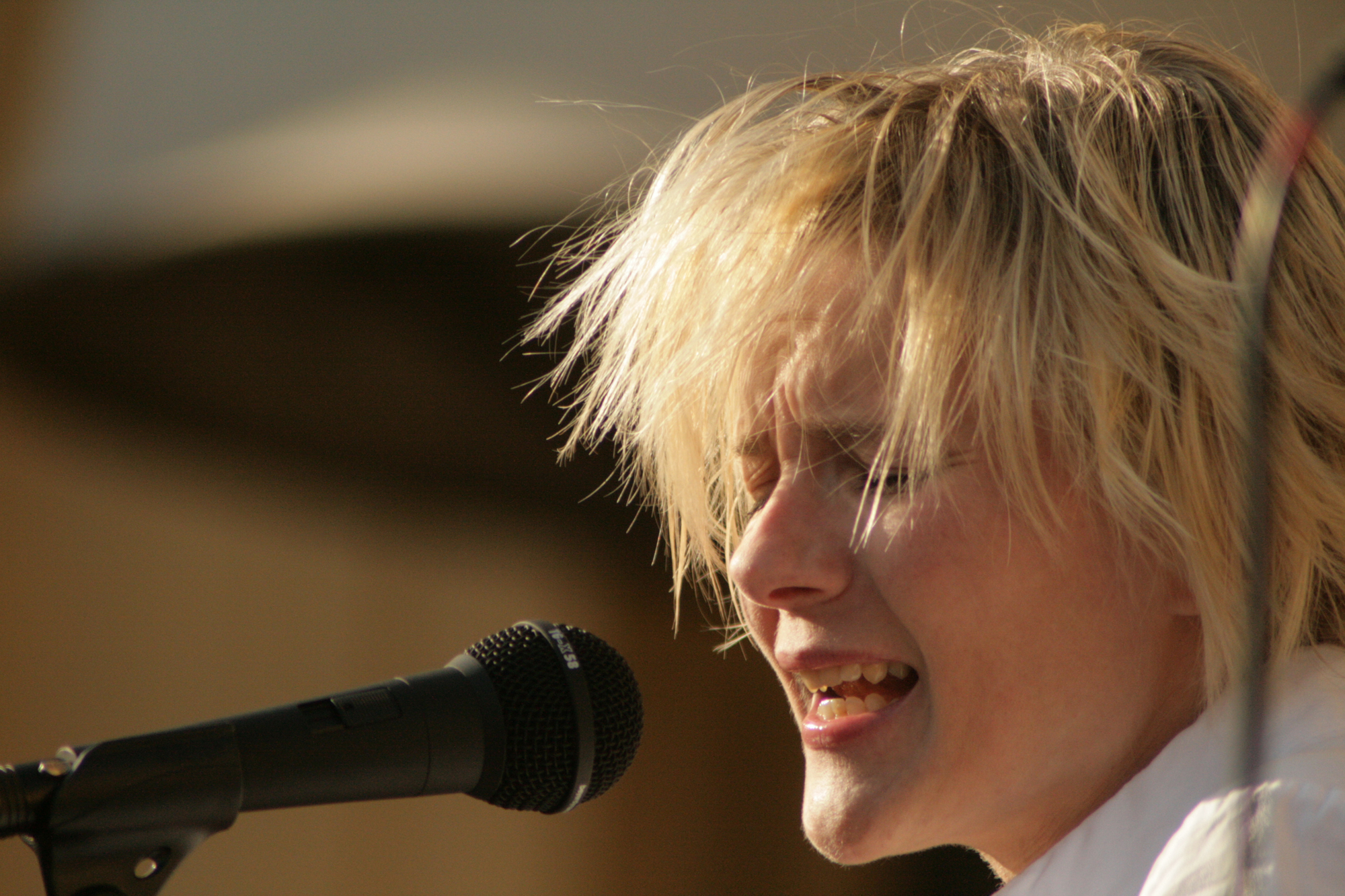
- Lisa Dillan in 2009

Background information
- Born: 12 May 1969 (age 57); Bodø, Norway
- Genre: Vocal jazz
- Occupation: Singer
- Label: Euridice
- Website: lisadillan.com

Lisa Dillan (born 12 May 1969) is a Norwegian jazz vocalist.

== Career ==
Dillan was at an early age central to the Bodø jazz scene, where she as an undergraduate in music by Bodø University College in 1990, joined the Bodø Big Band. Having studied in Oslo with Sidsel Endresen and Steve Dobrogosz (NRK takes 1994) she is a graduate of Performing and educational jazz at the Norwegian Academy of Music (2000). She received her Master's degree (2008) in vocal improvisation the same place where she rest since 2002 has taught and now is associate professor. She is also theaches at Toneheim Folk High School.

Dillan was in the acoustic improvisation trio & ldquo; Slinger & ldquo; with Lene Grenager cello and Hild Sofie Tafjord goat horn. Other collaborators have been Ingar Zach, No Spaghetti Edition, Helge Lien and Geir Lysne. Together with Anne-Lise Berntsen she run the improvisation duet «Hipp, hipp..» that was the NRK contribution to Gullpalmen in 2002.

Her own pop bands «Lisa & the Marias» consists of Jostein Ansnes (guitar), Sola Jonsen (drums), Erlend Smalås (bass) and Trygve Brøske (piano). She has, among other things performed at the Moldejazz in 2006. In the duo «Quite Quiet Project» with Asbjørn Lerheim (guitar) she has from 2009 played music by Elvis and has record project Bugge Wesseltoft and Nils Petter Molvær. She has performed two evocative album with Elvis tunes.

== Discography ==
=== Solo albums ===
- 2005: Vocal improvisations (Euridice)
- 2010: Arousal (CD og DVD, AIM), recorded in the Vigelandsmausoleet

=== Collaborations ===
With Asbjørn Lerheim

- 2012: Love Me Tender-The Quite Quiet Way (Kirkelig Kulturverksted)
- 2015: Change Of Habits (Kirkelig Kulturverksted)
- 2016: Laika (The Hungry Hearts)
