= Chrome Hill (band) =

Norwegian jazz band

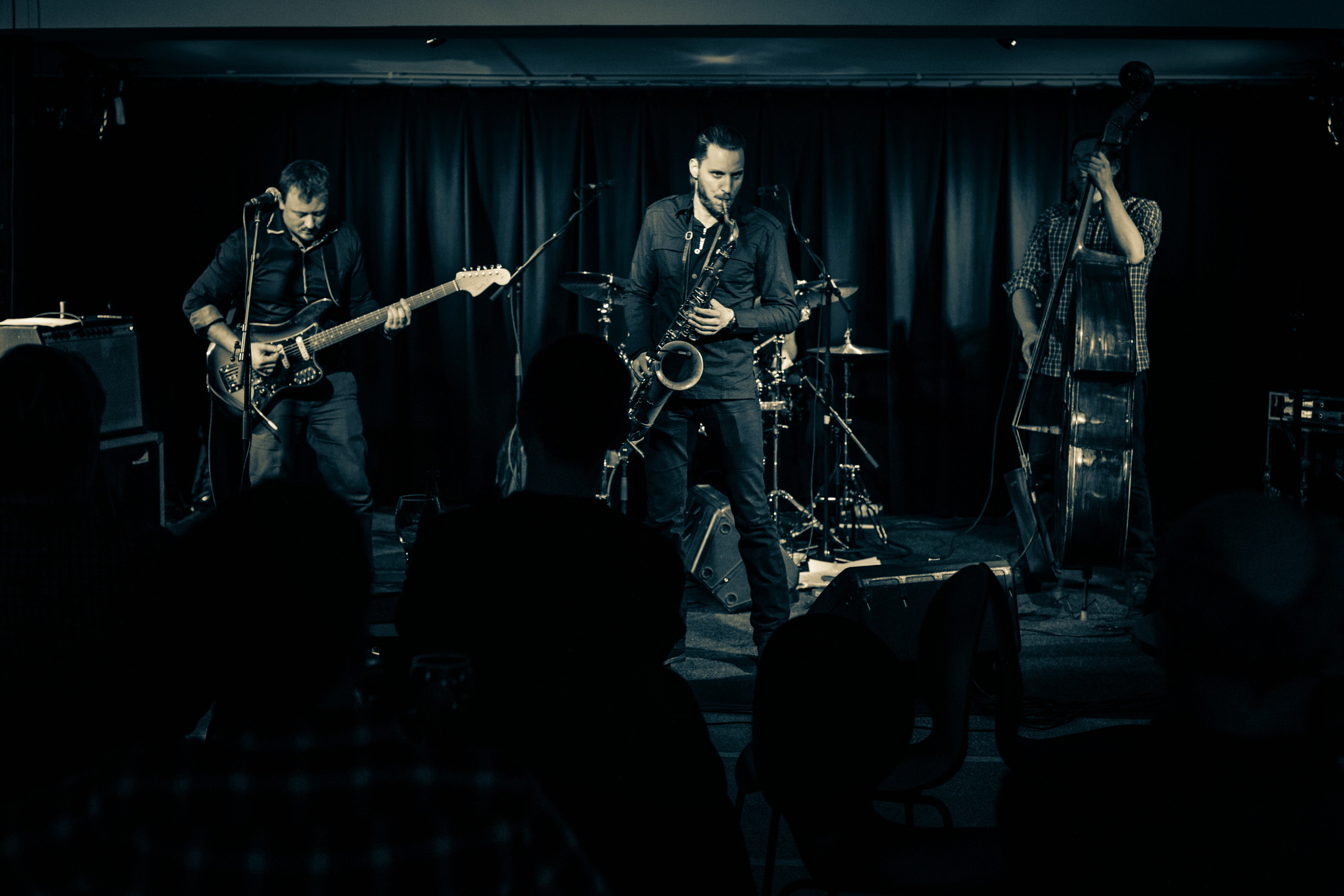
- Chrome Hill performing in 2014

Background information
- Also known as: Damp
- Origin: Oslo, Norway
- Genres: Jazz; Rock; Noise rock
- Years active: 2001–present
- Labels: Clean Feed Records
- Members: Asbjørn Lerheim; Torstein Lofthus; Atle Nymo; Roger Arntzen
- Past members: Jørgen Munkeby
- Website: www.chromehill.no/

Chrome Hill is a jazz quartet from Oslo, Norway, originating from the Norwegian Academy of Music. The band changed its name from Damp with the release of the album Earthlings in 2008. Chrome Hill has played in Norway, Sweden, England, France, Portugal and Japan.

== Music ==
In 2008 the album Earthlings was released under the band name Chrome Hill. Along with the change of name, came also a change of style. The music was no longer acoustic, with Asbjørn Lerheim's use of electric and baritone guitars, and clearly inspired by Americana and noise rock. The album was released by the Norwegian record label Bolage. The band released the album Country of Lost Borders in 2013, also on Bolage. In 2018 the band released The Explorer on Clean Feed Records.

== Crew ==
- Asbjørn Lerheim, guitar, baritone guitar, electric guitar. Lerheim has his background from jazz and improvisation studies at the Norwegian Academy of Music in Oslo. He also plays in duo with Lisa Dillan.
- Torstein Lofthus, drums. He has participated on many jazz, soul and pop albums, and is a frequently used session drummer. He plays regularly in Red Kite and Elephant 9.
- Atle Nymo, alto sax, bass clarinet. Nymo has his background from jazzlinja, NTNU and Norwegian Academy of Music. He plays regularly in I.P.A. and Atle Nymo Trio.
- Roger Arntzen, bass, double bass. Arntzen is the bass player in the piano trio In the country, who were chosen as the "Young jazz Musicians Of The Year 2004" at Molde International Jazz Festival. This trio has released several albums on Rune Grammofon to much acclaim.

Past members:

- Jørgen Munkeby, alto sax, clarinet. Munkeby is to be heard on a few Norwegian records, and is the leader of the highly acclaimed avant-prog quartet Shining. Munkeby was also one of the founding members of the nu-jazz band Jaga Jazzist, of which he was a member until 2002.

== Awards ==
In August 2001, Damp represented Norway at the Tremplin Jazz d'Avignon festival in Avignon, France, as one of the four bands from Europe. Jørgen Munkeby was awarded the soloist prize.

== Discography ==
- Earthlings, 2008
- Country of Lost Borders, 2013
- The Explorer, 2018
- This is Chrome Hill, 2020
