= Midwest (album) =

Studio album by Mathias Eick
- Released: March 20, 2015
- Recorded: May 2014
- Studio: Rainbow Studio; Oslo, Norway
- Genre: Jazz
- Length: 42:19
- Label: ECM; ECM 2410
- Producer: Manfred Eicher

Mathias Eick chronology
Skala (2011)	Midwest (2015)	Ravensburg (2018)

Professional ratings
Review scores
Source	Rating
All About Jazz	4.5/5 stars
All Music	4/5 stars
The Guardian	4/5 stars

Midwest is the third studio album by Norwegian jazz trumpeter Mathias Eick, recorded in May 2014 and released on ECM March the following year.

== Composition ==
Midwest consists of eight new songs dealing with the concept of home. The album was inspired by his tour of the US and Canada. The music is a tribute to the way the people and music move around the world. During its creation, this album was focused on the Midwestern United States because in the past, many Norwegians left Europe to move to America and settled in the Midwest.

== Reception ==
Thom Jurek in his review for AllMusic says that "The compositions are all lyrical, in typical Eick fashion, but with Larsen they take on a rougher, more earthen quality... it perfectly illustrates the thematic frame of the journey he set out to portray: that of the immigrant encountering the unknown and embracing it."

In his review for The Guardian, Dave Gely gave this album four stars and says that "Eick has a beautiful tone and writes attractive themes, by turns haunting and energetic." and added that "The inclusion of folk violinist Gjermund Larsen in the band adds a contrasting texture and some truly exciting solos."

Karl Ackermann gave a four and a half stars and says in All About Jazz that "Eick favors minimalist constructs and otherworldly atmospherics, qualities that are well suited in imagining the theme and mood he has intended for Midwest, a warm album as natural and comforting as going home."

== Track listing ==
All music is composed by Mathias Eick

No.	Title	Length
1.	"Midwest"	5:11
2.	"Hem"	5:14
3.	"March"	5:53
4.	"At Sea"	4:03
5.	"Dakota"	4:55
6.	"Lost"	5:43
7.	"Fargo"	6:18
8.	"November"	5:02
Total length:		42:19

== Personnel ==
- Mathias Eick – trumpet
- Gjermund Larsen – violin
- Jon Balke – piano
- Mats Eilertsen – double bass
- Helge Norbakken – percussion
