= The Door (Mathias Eick album) =

Studio album by Mathias Eick
- Released: August 19, 2008
- Recorded: September 2007
- Studio: Rainbow Studio; Oslo, Norway
- Genre: Jazz
- Length: 46:35
- Label: ECM; ECM 2059
- Producer: Manfred Eicher, Mathias Eick

Mathias Eick chronology
The Door (2008)	Skala (2011)

The Door is the debut studio album by Norwegian trumpeter, composer and multi-instrumentalist Mathias Eick recorded in September 2007 and released on ECM in August the following year.

== Reception ==
The AllMusic review by Thom Jurek awarded the album 3½ stars stating "This is an excellent introduction to a player who has plenty to say and many ways of saying it. The Door is a beautifully mysterious and deeply satisfying entry in the ECM canon and a very auspicious debut."

Brendon Griffin of PopMatters commented "If there’s a flaw in The Door, it lies in the strength of its opening salvo, an usustainable flow of raw communication which dissipates as it plays out. Perhaps Eick should’ve apportioned the dynamism and intensity of those first three tracks more equitably, but then that might’ve diminished the law of first impressions. If those do indeed count, Mathias Eick is destined for as long, rich and triumphantly plaintive a career as any of his pedigree’d compatriots."

John Kelman of All About Jazz added "With his warm tone, selfless allegiance to the collective, and personal nexus of lyrical form and freedom, Eick is the most important trumpeter to emerge from the Scandinavian scene since Henriksen and Molvær. Dogmatic in conception, The Door is all human in nature, delivering mightily on the promise of Eick's earlier ECM appearances."

Professional ratings
Aggregate scores
Source	Rating
Metacritic	81/100
Review scores
Source	Rating
Allmusic	3.5/5 stars
All About Jazz	4.5/5 stars
The Guardian	4/5 stars
PopMatters	8/10

== Track listing ==
All compositions by Mathias Eick

1. "The Door" – 7:56
2. "Stavanger" – 6:59
3. "Cologne Blues" – 8:46
4. "October" – 4:40
5. "December" – 4:44
6. "Williamsburg" – 7:23
7. "Fly" – 4:35
8. "Porvoo" – 4:13

== Personnel ==
- Mathias Eick – trumpet, guitar, vibraphone
- Jon Balke – piano, Fender Rhodes
- Audun Erlien – electric bass, guitar
- Audun Kleive – drums, percussion
- Stian Carstensen – pedal steel guitar (tracks 3–5)
