= Ravensburg (album) =

Studio album by Mathias Eick
- Released: March 2, 2018
- Recorded: June 2017
- Studio: Rainbow Studio; Oslo, Norway
- Genre: Jazz
- Length: 40:09
- Label: ECM; ECM 2584
- Producer: Manfred Eicher

Mathias Eick chronology
| Midwest (2015) | Ravensburg (2018) | When We Leave (2021) |

Professional ratings
Review scores
| Source | Rating |
|---|---|
| All About Jazz | 4/5 stars |
| RTÉ.ie | 4/5 stars |

Ravensburg is the fourth studio album by Norwegian jazz musician Mathias Eick, recorded in June 2017 and released on ECM March the following year. Eick originally planned to name the album Family but, after realizing how many albums already had that title, opted for Ravensburg, the Swabian town in Germany from which his grandmother came.

== Reception ==
Thomas Conrad of JazzTimes noted "Ravensburg, his fourth ECM album as a leader, reveals gradual, intelligent growth. His primary asset is still his trumpet sound, one of the purest, most radiant in jazz. His lyricism is still mysteriously provisional. No one plays trumpet lines like Eick’s. They are calls of hope and longing, streaks of light in the darkness. He still centers his albums, loosely, around unifying concepts. His previous recording, Midwest, was a journey toward home. Ravensburg is for those closest to him: family, friends, lovers."

== Track listing ==
All tracks are written by Mathias Eick

| No. | Title | Length |
|---|---|---|
| 1. | "Family" | 4:12 |
| 2. | "Children" | 5:42 |
| 3. | "Friends" | 6:14 |
| 4. | "August" | 4:57 |
| 5. | "Parents" | 5:12 |
| 6. | "Girlfriend" | 5:11 |
| 7. | "Ravensburg" | 5:33 |
| 8. | "For My Grandmothers" | 2:49 |
| Total length: | | 40:09 |

== Band ==
- Mathias Eick – trumpet, voice
- Håkon Aase – violin
- Andreas Ulvo – piano
- Audun Erlien – electric bass
- Torstein Lofthus – drums
- Helge Andreas Norbakken – drums, percussion
