= Martin Taxt =

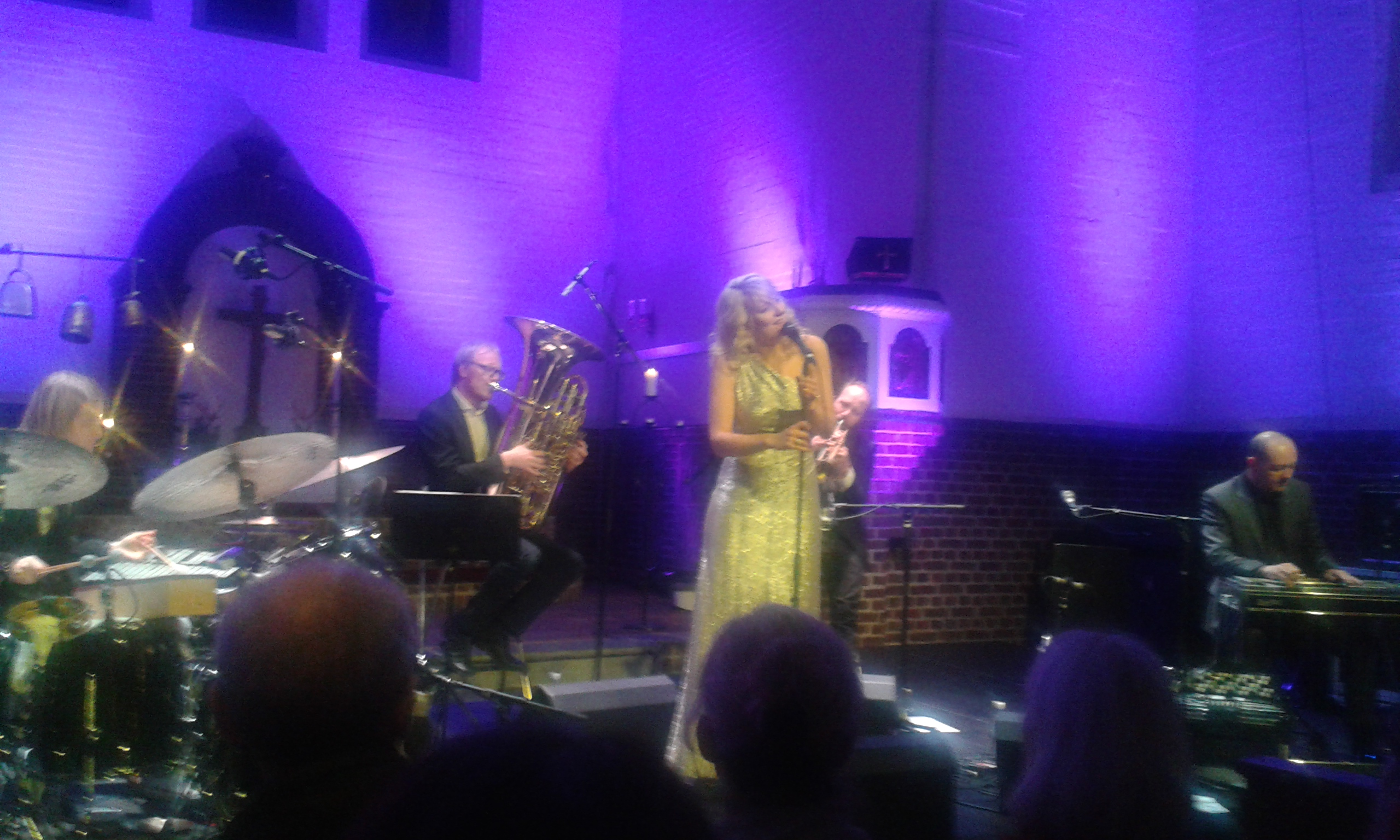
- Taxt with Tora Augestad and Music for a Wile 2014.

Background information
- Born: 18 January 1981 (age 45); Trondheim, Sør-Trøndelag
- Origin: Norway
- Genres: Jazz
- Occupations: Musician, composer, band leader
- Instrument: Tuba
- Website: Official website

Martin Taxt (born 18 January 1981 in Trondheim, Norway) is a Norwegian jazz musician (tuba), known from a variety of jazz bands like Koboku Senjû, Microtub, Muringa, Music for a While and Trondheim Jazz Orchestra.

== Career ==
Taxt is a graduate of the Norwegian Academy of Music (2002–2006) and the 'Conservatoire Nationale Superieur de Musique et de Danse à Paris' (2004–05). During his studies he initiated the bands 'Florebius' and 'Silucian Town' among others including the jazz singer Lena Nymark. Taxt has since 2004 been tubaist in the quintet Music for a While. As studio musician he has worked with artists like Odd Nordstoga, Hanne Hukkelberg and Maria Mena.

He has collaborated with the Japanese contemporary musicians Tetuzi Akiyama and Toshimaru Nakamura in the quintet 'Koboku Senjû' since 2006. From 2006 he has drifted the festival 'Fri Resonance' (a festival for new and experimental music) in Trondheim together with Kim Myhr and Håvard Volden. Since February 2010 Taxt has managed the label Sofa together with Kim Myhr, Ivar Grydeland and Ingar Zach. He has also collaborated on stage with violinist Ola Kvernberg.

== Discography ==
With Nils Ostendorf

- 2005: Spin Ensemble (Spin Records), including with Philippe Lauzier, Kim Myhr and Toma Gouband

With Tora Augestad's Music for a while including Mathias Eick, Stian Carstensen and Pål Hausken

- 2007: Weill Variations (Grappa Music)
- 2012: Graces That Refrain (Grappa Music)
- 2014: Canticles of Winter (Grappa Music)

With Tetuzi Akiyama

- 2008: Varianter Av Døde Traer (Sofa Records), including with Eivind Lønning and Espen Reinertsen

With the quintet 'Koboku Senjû'

- 2010: Selektiv Hogst (Sofa Records), including with Toshimaru Nakamura, Tetuzi Akiyama, Espen Reinertsen and Eivind Lønning

With Microtub (Robin Hayward/Peder Simonsen/Martin Taxt)

- 2011: Microtub (Sofa Music)
- 2014: Star System (Sofa Music)
- 2017: Bite of the Orange (Sofa Music)

With Kurt Liedwart and Andrey Popovskiy

- 2017: Hjem (Mikroton Recordings)
