= Skala (Mathias Eick album) =

Studio album by Mathias Eick
- Released: March 18, 2011
- Recorded: December 2009 – January 2010
- Studio: Cabin Recorders, Bugges Room, and Pooka Studio, Oslo
- Genre: Jazz
- Length: 41:41
- Label: ECM; ECM 2187
- Producer: Mathias Eick, Manfred Eicher

Mathias Eick chronology
The Door (2008)	Skala (2011)	Midwest (2015)

Professional ratings
Review scores
Source	Rating
All About Jazz	4.5/5 stars
The Guardian	2/5 stars
The Irish Times	2/5 stars
PopMatters	7/10

Skala is the second studio album by Norwegian jazz trumpeter Mathias Eick, recorded in December 2009 and January 2010 and released on ECM in March 2011.

== Reception ==
Brent Burton of JazzTimes stated "Is Skala a jazz record? The guy who made it, Mathias Eick, is certainly a jazz musician. The Norwegian trumpeter, age 31, improvises all over Vespers, the glacially paced new album from the Iro Haarla Quintet. But on Skala, his second (and most scripted) album as a leader, Eick largely sticks to melodies and motifs. His devotion to composition, coupled with drummer Gard Nilssen’s tendency to play in bouncy 4/4, means that, at times, Skala behaves less like modern jazz than it does horn-laden pop."

John Kelman of All About Jazz wrote "In the context of his own work, he continues to favor substance over style, and while the music of Skala is even more structured than that on The Door, when Eick does solo, it's with an economical precision that weaves through grooves and changes with equal aplomb."

Ray Comiskey of The Irish Times added "Eick is a beautiful, imaginative musician with a very Scandinavian sense of transience informing his melodic charm... But there’s not much blood in Skala, despite the sweat."

== Track listing ==
All tracks are written by Mathias Eick

No.	Title	Length
1.	"Skala"	6:14
2.	"Edinburgh"	5:04
3.	"June"	4:14
4.	"Oslo"	5:27
5.	"Joni"	5:52
6.	"Biermann"	6:07
7.	"Day After"	4:52
8.	"Epilogue"	3:20
Total length:		41:41

== Personnel ==
- Mathias Eick – trumpet
- Andreas Ulvo – piano
- Audun Erlien – electric bass
- Torstein Lofthus – drums
- Gard Nilssen – drums
- Morten Qvenild – keyboards
- Tore Brunborg – tenor saxophone
- Sidsel Walstad – harp
