= Asbjørn Lerheim =

Norwegian jazz musician and educator

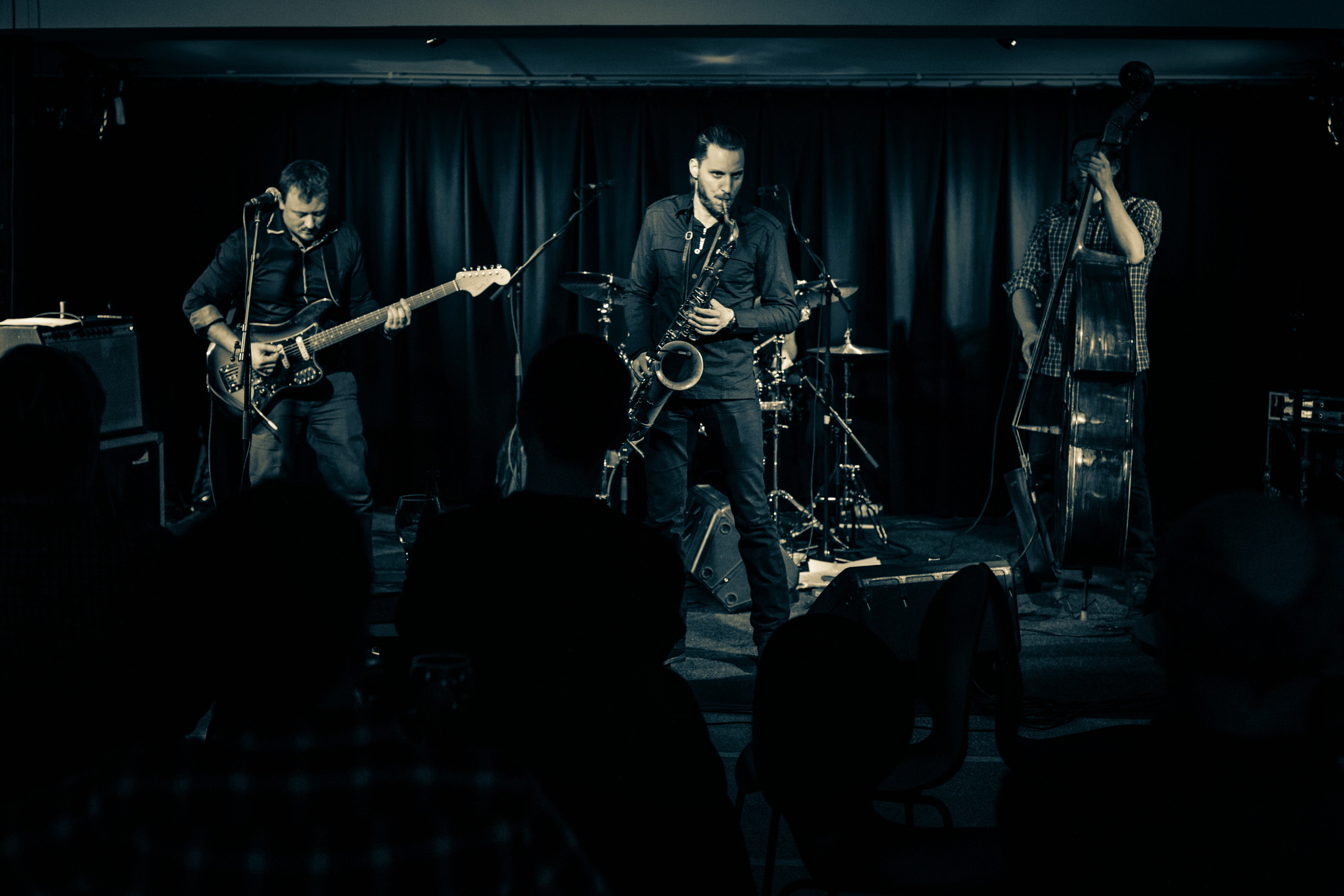
- Asbjørn Lerheim to the left, with Chrome Hill in 2014.

Background information
- Birth name: Asbjørn Erlend Lerheim
- Born: 28 April 1977 (age 48); Ålesund, Sunnmøre
- Origin: Norway
- Genres: Jazz
- Occupation(s): Musician, composer
- Instrument: Guitar
- Website: www.asbjornlerheim.com

Asbjørn Erlend Lerheim (born 28 April 1977 in Ålesund, Norway) is a Norwegian jazz guitarist and music educator.

== Career ==
Lerheim was raised in Langevåg in Sula Municipality, Møre og Romsdal county, but has been based in Oslo since 1996. He is a graduate of music at Fagerlia upper secondary school, and executed further studies at Viken folkehøgskole, University of Oslo and the Norwegian Academy of Music. As college/university lecturer, he teaches inter alia, at the University of Oslo and the Fjellhaug Internasjonale Høgskole.

Lerheims has numerous recordings on his shoulders, the two main projects is with the band Chrome Hill, as composer and baritone guitarist with Jørgen Munkeby (saxophone), Torstein Lofthus (drumes) and Roger Arntzen (upright bass), and in collaboration wit Lisa Dillan in the duo Quite Quiet Project, where they re-interprets material known from Elvis Presley's performances. On the duo's first album Love me tender – The Quite Quiet Way and by a variety of live performances, with contributions by several members of Presleys TCB Band. As jazz musician has Lerheim toured in several European countries as well as in Zimbabwe, Nepal and Japan. He received Statens kunstnerstipend by the Norwegian government and allocations by the Fond for utøvende kunstnere in Norway.

== Discography ==
With o j trio

- 2001: Breaks Even (OJCD 01)

With Damp/Chrome Hill

- 2003: Mostly Harmless (Songs) (Aim Records AIMCD 110)
- 2005: Hoatzin (Aim Records AIMCD 110)
- 2008: Earthlings (Bolage BLGCD007)
- 2013: Country Of Lost Borders (BLGCD020)

With Subtonic

- 2004: In This House (Aim Records AIMCD 106)

With Lisa Dillan

- 2012: Love Me Tender-The Quite Quiet Way (KKV FXCD377)
- 2015: Change Of Habits (KKV FXCD411)

With Suzy&2

- 2013: In Kathmandu (MUSIC NEPAL LTD.)
