= Music for a While (band) =

Norwegian musical group

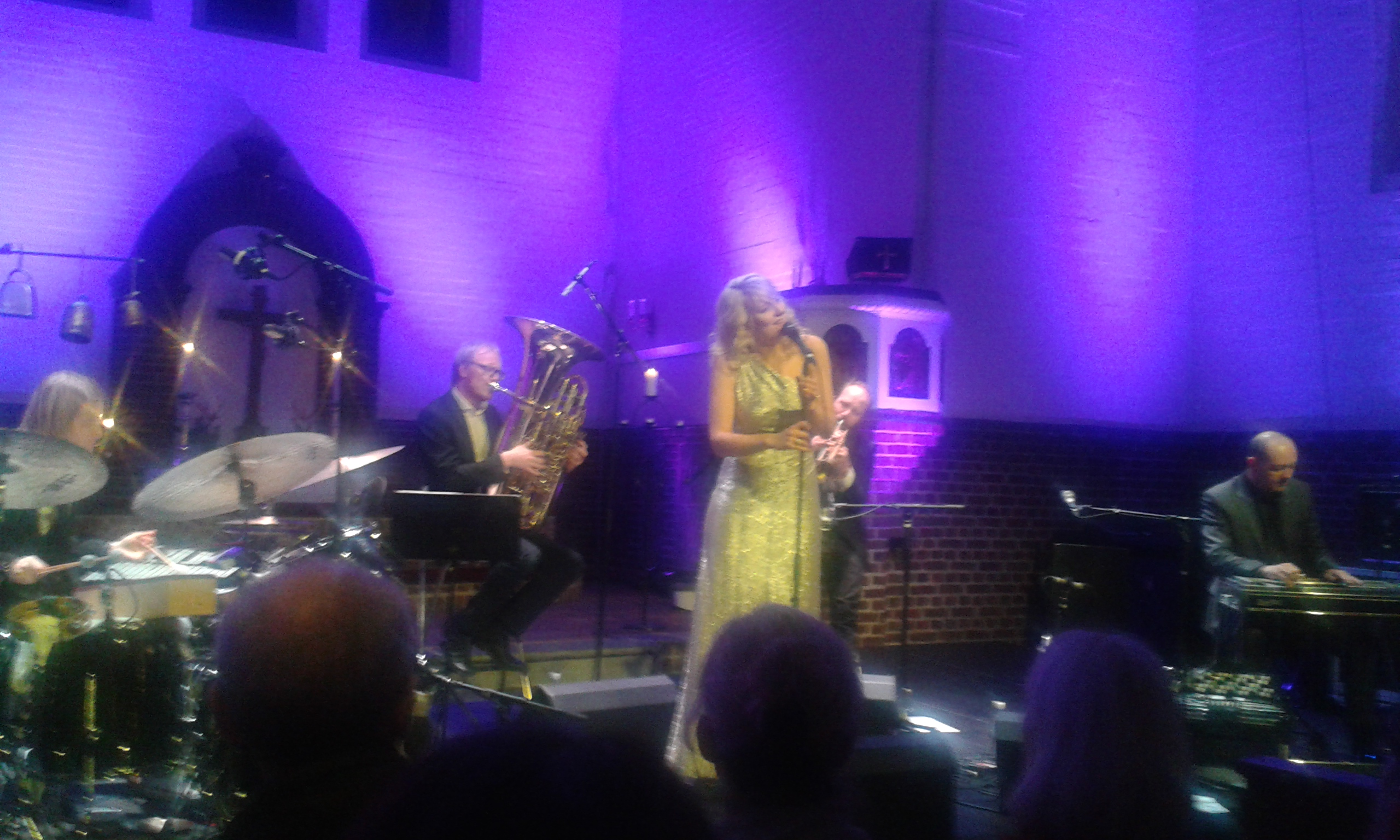
- Tora Augestad and Music for a while 2014.

Background information
- Origin: Oslo, Norway
- Genres: Kabaret, jazz
- Years active: 2004–present
- Labels: Grappa
- Members: Tora Augestad; Mathias Eick; Stian Carstensen; Martin Taxt; Pål Hausken
- Website: www.toraaugestad.no/project/music-while

Music for a While (established 2004 in Oslo, Norway) is a Norwegian kabaret ensemble led by Norway's uncrowned queen of cabaret, Tora Augestad.

== Biography ==
Their music is obtained from the cabaret, baroque and church music repertoire, with elements of jazz. They present different musical styles with a very distinctive sound.

Music for a While released their debut album Weill Variations (2007). The follow-up album Graces that refrain (2012) received critical acclaim. It was accompanied by a tour in Norway. Their third release was the album Canticles of Winter (2014).

== Band members ==
- Tora Augestad – vocals
- Mathias Eick – trumpet
- Stian Carstensen – accordion, banjo and pedal steel guitar
- Martin Taxt – tuba
- Pål Hausken – drums

== Discography ==
- 2007: Weill Variations (Grappa Music)
- 2012: Graces That Refrain (Grappa Music)
- 2014: Canticles of Winter (Grappa Music)
