= Stian Carstensen =

Norwegian jazz musician

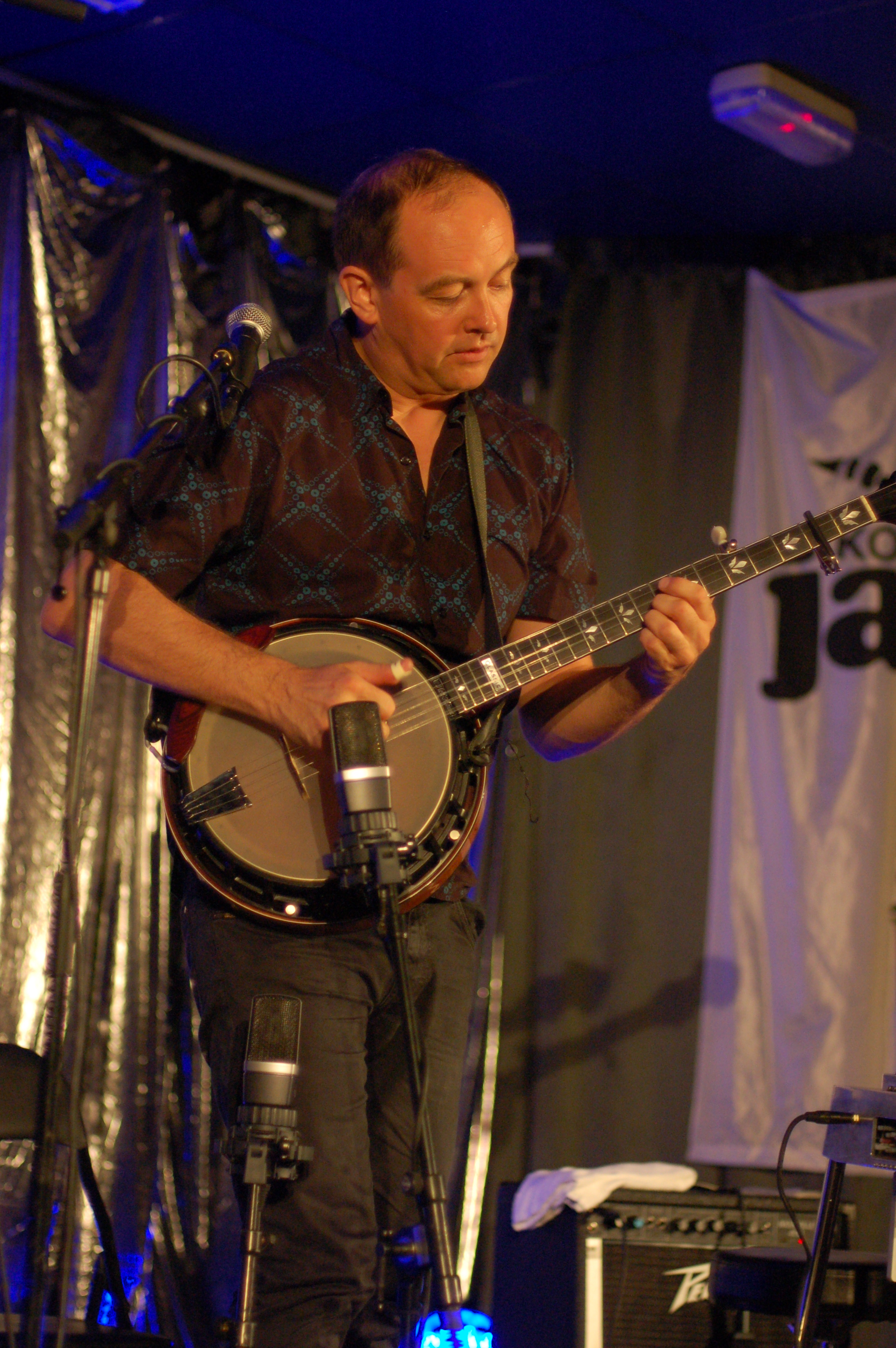
- Stian Carstensen with banjo Photo: Johannes Selvaag

Background information
- Born: 5 January 1971 (age 55); Eidsvoll Municipality, Akershus
- Origin: Norway
- Genres: Jazz
- Occupations: Musician, entertainer, composer, band leader
- Instruments: Accordion, guitar, multi-instrumentalist
- Label: Winter & Winter
- Member of: Farmers Market
- Website: farmers-market.net/bio/stian-carstensen

Stian Carstensen (born 5 January 1971) is a Norwegian multi-instrumentalist musician, entertainer and with Jarle Vespestad (drums) and Nils-Olav Johansen (vocal and guitar), central member of the Balkan-jazz orchestra Farmers Market.

== Biography ==
Carstensen was born in Eidsvoll Municipality and began playing the accordion at the age of nine. He first learned from his father, and later from a classical player which he attended for four years. During this time he played in Norwegian TV, radio, festivals etc. He also toured in America, playing classical music. At the same time he was into swing jazz, and played standard tunes with his father, who was also a bass player.

When Carstensen was 15 he started to play electric guitar in a rock band. After a while he resumed his interest in jazz and formed a trio with some local artists. He went freelance for a year or so and then he began to study in the Jazz Program at the Trondheim Musikkonservatorium, with the guitar as a main instrument. During his two years of study in Trondheim (1991–93), he formed the group Farmers Market. The group was originally a free jazz quintet, until they one day found sheet music with a Bulgarian folk tune in 11/16. This was a great experience for the band members and they practiced day and night to be able to play this asymmetrical music.

After a while Carstensen went to Bulgaria and visited villages there to collect and study the local folk music. The result of the tour was a live record, Speed/Balkan/Boogie, with singers and musicians from the famous "Le mysteres des voix bulgares" recorded at Molde International Jazz Festival in Norway. After this he was totally dedicated to the Bulgarian music. He toured a lot with musicians from Bulgaria and Romania, and learned a lot from them.

Besides of being dedicated to this kind of music, he also took lessons in Composition, learned to play the 5-string banjo in bluegrass style, played with various jazz groups (be-bop, and experimental) with Jon Christensen and Bendik Hofseth to mention some.

In 1997 Farmers Market made their second album, Music from the Hybrides, with saxophonist Trifon Trifonov from Bulgaria. This was an extreme album with elements of many different styles and ideas from bluegrass in odd meters to Metallica-like versions of traditional Balkan tunes and slick commercial music mixed with Stockhausen. The album got very good reviews from many contemporary music magazines as well as rock, folk and jazz magazines in Europe.

In 1998 Carstensen was invited to write commissioned work for Vossajazz Norwegian Jazz Festival at Vossavangen. He wrote some music and put together a band consisting of his colleague Jarle Vespestad, a leading Norwegian drummer who also play in Farmers Market, with Django Bates from England, with Tord Gustavsen Trio from Norway, and Ernst Reijseger from the Netherlands. The music was performed in April 1998, with great success. The choice of musicians was made carefully, because they each had one thing in common; they were into a lot of styles at the same time. The music was composed in a contemporary spirit, but contained elements from many different styles without being artificial.

This seems to be a highlight in Carstensen's career, and he has been working a lot with that ensemble after this. Another highlight was his release of the new record Farmers Market on the German label Winter & Winter, he toured Europe and Japan with this band in 2000. They received very good reviews both for the album and the concert in magazines such as The Wire, Rolling Stone among others. Farmers Market has also played at the world's biggest jazz festival, the North Sea Jazz Festival in The Hague, the Netherlands.

Carstensen also played with Dutch cello player Ernst Reijseger. They work as a duo, playing only self-written stuff in various improvisational folk styles.

He has studied Bulgarian polyphony in Bulgaria, and rural American Afro-Celtic music in the Appalachians, on a fee from the Norwegian cultural department. He is currently on a two-year state fee to study Bulgarian traditional music. His instruments are: accordion, kaval (Bulgarian flute), bagpipes, guitar, violin, mandolin & banjo.

He played the accordionist in the circus band (and the soundtrack) of the 2005 Neil Gaiman, Dave McKean film MirrorMask.

In 2000 Carstensen recorded his solo album, with only his own compositions for Winter & Winter, to be released in 26 countries.

John Kellman of All About Jazz recognized Carstensen's commission Flip for Vossajazz March 2013, as no. 1 of his "Best Live Shows of 2013".

== Discography (in selection) ==
=== Solo albums ===
- 2004: Backwards Into The Backwoods (Winter & Winter)
- 2021: Musical Sanatorium (Grappa Musikkforlag)

=== Collaborations ===
With Farmers Market

(Stian Carstensen, Trifon Trifonov, Nils-Olav Johansen, Finn Guttormsen, Jarle Vespestad)

- 1995: Speed/Balkan/Boogie (Kirkelig Kulturverksted)
- 1997: Musikk fra Hybridene (Music From The Hybrides) (Kirkelig Kulturverksted)
- 2000: Farmers Market (Winter & Winter), nominated for This year's jazz records 2001 in Norway
- 2008: Surfin' USSR (Ipecac/Tuba)
- 2012: Slav to the Rhythm (Division)

With Frode Alnæs & Arild Andersen

- 1998: Sommerbrisen (Kirkelig Kulturverksted)
- 2003: Julegløggen (Kirkelig Kulturverksted)
- 2006: Høstsløv (Kirkelig Kulturverksted)

With Iain Ballamy

- 2000: Pepper St. Interludes (Feral Records), featuring Stian Carstensen with special guests: Norma Winstone, Martin France, Matthew Sharp
- 2004: The Little Radio (Sound Recordings)

With Kaizers Orchestra

- 2001: Ompa Til Du Dør (Broiler Farm)

Within Børre Dalhaug's «Bigbandblast»

- 2004: Bigbandblast! (Real Records)

Duo with Jimmy Rosenberg

- 2005: Rose Room (Hot Club Records)

With Eldbjørg Raknes

- 2005: Små Sanger Mest I Det Blå (Bergland Productions), including with Siri Gjære

With Mathias Eick

- 2007: The Door (ECM Records)

With Tora Augestad's Music for a While including Mathias Eick, Martin Taxt and Pål Hausken

- 2007: Weill Variations (Grappa Music)
- 2012: Graces That Refrain (Grappa Music)
- 2014: Canticles of Winter (Grappa Music)

With Alexander Rybak & Mats Paulson

- 2011: Visa Vid Vindens Ängar (Grappa Music)

With Gammalgrass

- 2013: Obsolete Music 1 (Division Records)
