= Tora Augestad =

Norwegian singer, conductor, and actor

- Born: Tora Karen Elisabeth Augestad; 10 December 1979 (age 46); Bergen, Norway
- Genres: Cabaret, classical music, jazz
- Occupations: Musician, conductor and actor
- Instrument: Vocals
- Member of: Music for a While
- Spouse: Sahin Dagdelen
- Website: www.toraaugestad.no

Tora Karen Elisabeth Augestad (born 10 December 1979) is a Norwegian mezzosoprano, musical conductor and actor. One of Norway's most established classical singers, she focuses on jazz, musical theater, contemporary music, and cabaret. Her stage debut was the lead role in "Annie" in 1994, and won the Norwegian talent competition in 1993 at TV 2. Augestad has received Spellemannprisen (Norwegian Grammy Award) and other awards for her albums. She is a frequent collaborator of Norwegian composer Marcus Paus.

== Background and education ==
Augestad was born in Bergen, educated at the Norges Musikkhøgskole in Oslo and the Kungliga Musikhögskolan in Stockholm and has studied singing with such as Torsten Föllinger and Ståle Ytterli, both classical music and jazz. She holds a master's degree in cabaret singing at Norges Musikkhøgskole with particular emphasis on Hanns Eisler, Kurt Weill and American cabaret.

She is the daughter of Program 81/82 vocalist Kate Augestad and composer Geir Johnson.

== Career ==
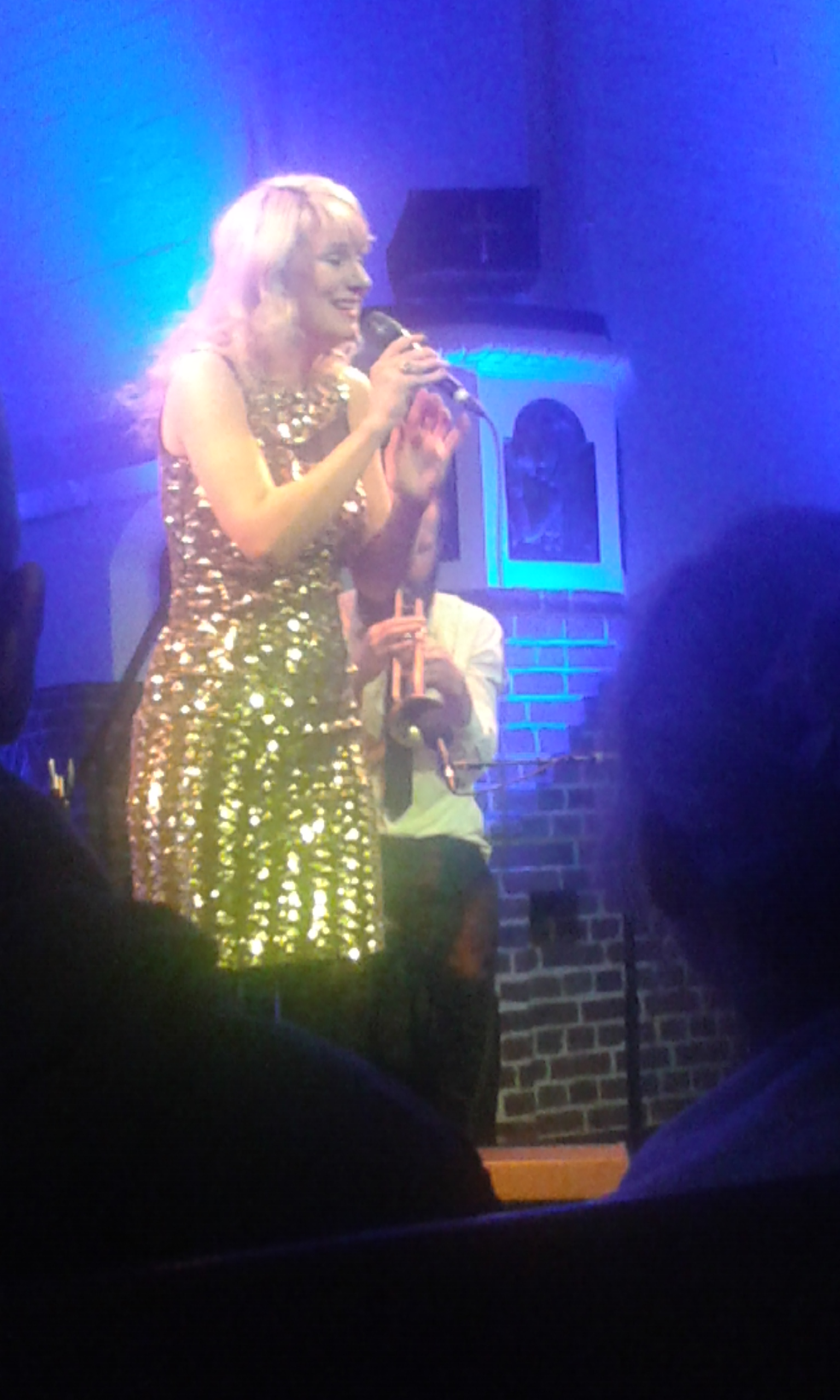
Augestad and Mathias Eick with Music for a While in Bergen 18 December 2014.

Augestad sang in Det Norske Solistkor (2000–2005) and the vocal band Pitsj (1999–2006). She is the lead singer in the ensemble Music for a While, with the record release Weill Variations (2007). They released their second album Graces that refrain (2012) accompanied by a tour in Norway. Their third release was the album Canticles of Winter (2014).

Augestad has been a soloist at the show The Source: Of Christmas with "The Source", participated in various cabarets and operas is and has been an actor/singer at "Teater Ibsen" in Skien as well as at the Riksteatret. She conducted the "Norges ungdomskor" (200-06). She is singing in the trio BOA, has been a soloist with various orchestras and ensembles, including the Oslo Sinfonietta during the "Oslo Kammermusikkfestival".

Augestad moved to Berlin in 2007, and has been currently working with some of Europe's leading ensembles for contemporary music including Ensemble Modern and Klangforum Wien. 15 October 2010 she was a guest on the Beat for beat, a program at NRK1.

In 2008 she portrayed the Grand High Witch in the children's opera The Witches by Marcus Paus and Ole Paus; the role was written for her.

Since 2009 she has worked with the Swiss star director Christoph Marthaler. She has participated in the following of his productions at the opera in Basel: as soloist in "Wüstenbuch" (opera by Beat Furrer), in "Meine faire Dame – ein Sprachlabor", and "Lo Stimolatore Cardiaco".

Augestad had her debut in 2012 at the Zürich Opera in a new production by Christoph Marthaler with soloist Anne Sofie von Otter among others.

In 2018 Augestad and the Oslo Philharmonic released the album Portraying Passion: Works by Weill/Paus/Ives, with works by Kurt Weill, Marcus Paus and Charles Ives. Musicologist Ralph P. Locke highlighted Augestad's recording of Paus' Hate Songs for Mezzo-Soprano and Orchestra, based on poetry by Dorothy Parker, as one of the "best opera and vocal music" works in that year, and noted that it "proved to be one of the most engaging works" in recent years; "the cycle expresses Parker's favorite theme: how awful human beings are, especially the male of the species." Augestad won the 2018 Spellemannprisen (Norwegian Grammy Award) in the Classical class for the album.

At the 2019 concert "Paus meets Cohen", Augestad and NyNorsk Messingkvintett performed new works by Ole Paus and Marcus Paus.

In 2020 Augestad released the mini-album Good Vibes in Bad Times, a song cycle by Marcus Paus that reconceptualizes texts by Donald Trump as poems.

== Discography ==
=== Solo albums ===
Within Music for a While including with Stian Carstensen, Mathias Eick, Martin Taxt and Pål Hausken

- 2007: Weill Variations (Grappa Music)
- 2012: Graces That Refrain (Grappa Music)
- 2014: Canticles of Winter (Grappa Music)

Within 'Augestad & Waagaard Duo'

- 2010: Over The Piano: American Cabaret Songs (Norway Music)

Within 'BOA Trio' including with Morten Barrikmo and Tanja Orning

- 2013: BOA mOOn Over tOwns (Grappa Music)

=== Collaborations ===
Within 'Pitsj'

- 2006: Pitsj (Grappa Music)

With 'Kammerkoret Nova' and Anne Karin Sundal-Ask

- 2012: To Whom We Sing (Lawo Classics)

With Trygve Seim, Frode Haltli and Svante Henryson

- 2016: Rumi Songs (ECM Records)

With the Oslo Philharmonic

- 2018: Portraying Passion: Works by Weill/Paus/Ives (Lawo Classics), with works by Kurt Weill, Marcus Paus and Charles Ives

With various artists

- 2019: Dialogues

With Anders Kregnes Hansen

- 2020: Good Vibes in Bad Times (MTG Music)
