= Mathias Eick =

Norwegian jazz musician

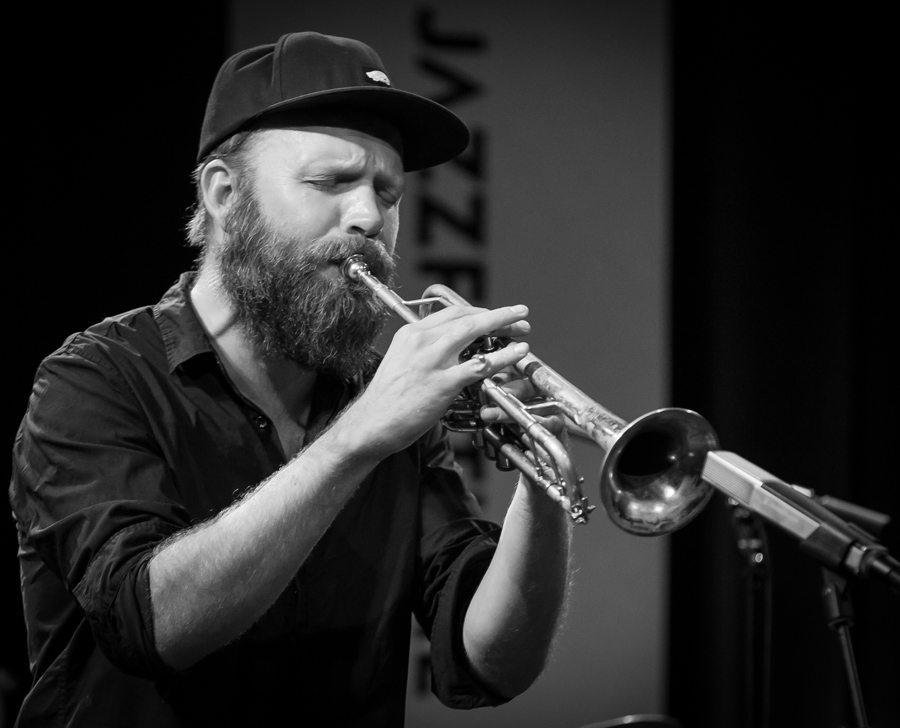
- Mathias Eick in 2016 at Oslo Jazzfestival

Background information
- Born: 16 June 1979 (age 46); Furnes, Hedmark
- Origin: Norway
- Genres: Jazz
- Occupations: Musician, composer
- Instrument: Trumpet
- Label: ECM
- Formerly of: Motif; Jaga Jazzist
- Website: www.mathiaseick.no

Mathias Eick (born 26 June 1979) is a Norwegian jazz musician, and the brother of the jazz musicians Johannes Eick and Trude Eick. He is mainly known from his releases on the jazz label ECM Records. His main instrument is the trumpet, but he also plays upright bass, vibraphone, piano and guitar. He has performed with several well-known music groups and musicians, e.g. Jaga Jazzist, Manu Katché, and the Trondheim Jazz Orchestra together with Chick Corea and Pat Metheny. Besides this he is also known for his collaboration with Norwegian singer-songwriter Thomas Dybdahl, and recordings with the Norwegian bands Turboneger, DumDum Boys, Motorpsycho, D'Sound and Bigbang.

== Career ==
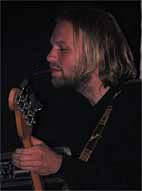
Eick during a concert in Eidsfoss, Norway, 2002.

After finishing high school, he started on the Music program at the Toneheim Folkehøyskole near by Hamar, followed by studies on the Jazz program at Trondheim Musikkonsevatorium.

In 2007, Eick won the International Jazz Talent, awarded to him by the International Jazz Festivals Organization situated in New York. In 2009, he won the Statoil Scholarship in Norway as he was heading for the release of his second album under influential jazz record label ECM.

In the meantime Eick keeps himself busy participating on several albums playing either trumpet, double bass, vibraphone, piano, guitar, or in his own words “anything needed.” Some of his collaborators have been, among a vast amount of others, Trondheim Jazz Orchestra and Chick Corea, Iro Haarla, Manu Katché and Jacob Young. Eick is also a member of the Norwegian genre-defying group Jaga Jazzist, a group with which he has performed for many years. In the summer of 2006 he toured with Jan Gunnar Hoff Group and Mike Stern and in October/November on European tour with Thomas Dybdahl.

Eicks band is currently a five-piece, featuring two drummers, bass, piano and Eick himself. The lineup changes invariably as all the participating musicians are amongst Norway's finest, but for the most part the band consists of Andreas Ulvo (piano), Torstein Lofthus and Gard Nilssen (drums), and Audun Erlien (bass). The music is composed by Eick and pays tribute to both the truly unique Scandinavian soundscape, as well as the lyricism and melancholy of the Canadian trumpeter Kenny Wheeler.

In 2013 Eick appeared at the North Sea Jazz Festival within his own Quintet including Andreas Ulvo (piano, Fender Rhodes, keyboards, electronics), Audun Erlien (bass), Andreas Bye & Kenneth Kapstad (drums).

== Discography ==
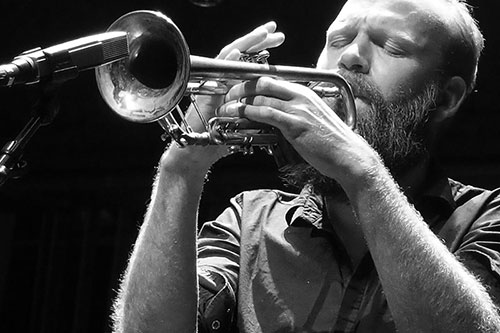
Mathias Eick at Reykjavik Jazz Festival 2015

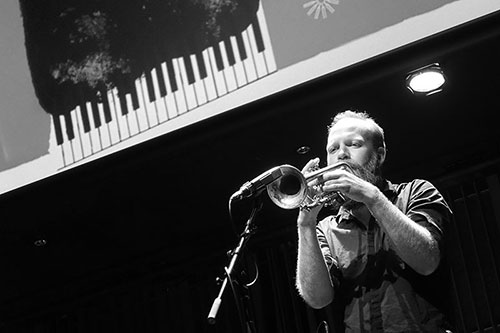
Mathias Eick at Reykjavik Jazz Festival 2015

=== Solo albums ===
- 2008: The Door (ECM)
- 2011: Skala (ECM)
- 2015: Midwest (ECM)
- 2018: Ravensburg (ECM)
- 2021: When We Leave (ECM)
- 2025: Lullaby (ECM)

=== As a Sideman ===
With Jaga Jazzist

- 2001: A Livingroom Hush (Ninja Tune)
- 2003: The Stix (Ninja Tune)
- 2005: What We Must (Ninja Tune)
- 2010: One-Armed Bandit (Ninja Tune)
- 2013: Live with Britten Sinfonia (Ninja Tune)

With Jacob Young

- 2004: Evening Falls (ECM)
- 2007: Sideways (ECM)

With Jan Gunnar Hoff

- 2008: Magma (Grappa Music)

With Iro Haarla

- 2004: Northbound (ECM) with Trygve Seim, Uffe Krokfors and Jon Christensen
- 2011: Vespers (ECM) with Trygve Seim, Ulf Krokfors and Jon Christensen

With Manu Katché

- 2007: Playground (ECM) with Trygve Seim, Marcin Wasilewski, Slawomir Kurkiewicz and David Torn

With Music for a While including Tora Augestad, Stian Carstensen, Martin Taxt and Pål Hausken

- 2007:: Weill Variations (Grappa Music)
- 2012: Graces That Refrain (Grappa Music)
- 2014: Canticles of Winter (Grappa Music)

With Lars Danielsson

- 2009: Tarantella (ACT Music)
- 2014: Liberetto II (ACT Music)

With Ola Kvernberg's Liarbird

- 2011: Liarbird (Jazzland Recordings), the commissioned work, live from Moldejazz 2010 including Bergmund Waal Skaslien (viola), Eirik Hegdal (saxophone), Håkon Kornstad (saxophone), Ingebrigt Håker Flaten and Ole Morten Vågan (bass), as well as Erik Nylander and Torstein Lofthus (drums)

With Elvira Nikolaisen

- 2013: I Concentrate On You (Grappa)

With Eple Trio

- 2014: Universal Cycle (Shipwreckords)

With Vincent Peirani

- 2013: SWR NewJazz Meeting 2013 with Émile Parisien (Jazzhaus)
- 2016: Living Being Extended with Émile Parisien, Leïla Martial, Yoann Serra, Tony Paeleman and Julien Herné (SWR JazzHaus)

With Unifony (Minco Eggersman and Theodoor Borger)

- 2018: Unifony (Butler Records)

With Benjamin Lackner

- 2022 Last Decade (ECM)
- 2025 Spindrift (ECM)

=== As a Session Musician ===
- 2001: Motorpsycho - Phanerothyme
- 2002: Motorpsycho - It's a Love Cult
- 2002: Arcturus - The Sham Mirrors
- 2003: The Gathering - Souvenirs
- 2003: Motorpsycho w/ Jaga Jazzist Horns - In the Fishtank 10
- 2004: Lars Horntveth - Pooka
- 2004: Janove Ottesen - Francis' Lonely Nights
- 2005: Turbonegro - Party Animals
- 2006: Kinny & Horne - Forgetting to Remember
- 2007: Ulver - Shadows of the Sun
- 2008: Jan Gunnar Hoff - Magma
- 2009: Youn Sun Nah - Voyage
- 2009: Inger Marie Gundersen - My Heart Would Have a Reason
- 2009: Thomas Dybdahl - En Samling (compilation)
- 2009: Silvertongue - Diamond Sky
- 2010: Motorpsycho - Heavy Metal Fruit
- 2010: Mighty Sam McClain w/ Mahsa Vahdat - Scent of Reunion: Love Duets Across Civilizations
- 2012: Mighty Sam McClain w/ Mahsa Vahdat - A Deeper Tone of Longing: Love Duets Across Civilizations
- 2012: Alexander Von Mehren - Aéropop

== Awards ==
Mathias Eick was awarded “The International Jazz Award for New Talent 2007”. He received a prize of $20,000 US on 13 January 2007 during the IAJE 34th Annual International Conference in New York City where he also performed. The annual prize was founded by IAJE in cooperation with the International Jazz Festivals Organization (IJFO). He was awarded the 2014 DNB price at Kongsberg Jazzfestival (300,000 NOK).

== Festival sites ==
- Molde-jazz
- Montreal Jazz festival
- Montreux Jazz Festival
- Monterey Jazz Festival

Awards
Preceded by Håkon Mjåset Johansen	Recipient of the Kongsberg Jazz Award; 2014	Succeeded by Ellen Andrea Wang
