= Pyramid (Jaga Jazzist album) =

Studio album by Jaga Jazzist
- Released: 7 August 2020
- Studio: Isitart; Pooka
- Genre: Jazz
- Length: 39:08
- Label: Brainfeeder
- Producer: Marcus Forsgren; Lars Horntveth

Jaga Jazzist chronology
Starfire (2015)	Pyramid (2020)	Pyramid Remix (2021)

Pyramid is a studio album by Norwegian eight-piece jazz band Jaga Jazzist. It was released on 7 August 2020 through Brainfeeder. It peaked at number 47 on the UK Independent Albums Chart. It received generally favorable reviews from critics.

== Background ==
Pyramid was recorded over the course of two weeks. It is the band's first self-produced studio album. Lars Horntveth wrote the album's songs. The song "Tomita" is named after Japanese composer Isao Tomita. The song "The Shrine" takes its title from Fela Kuti's club in Lagos.

It was followed by a remix album, Pyramid Remix, in 2021.

== Critical reception ==
Professional ratings
Aggregate scores
Source	Rating
Metacritic	75/100
Review scores
Source	Rating
AllMusic	4/5 stars
Exclaim!	6/10
The Line of Best Fit	7/10
Paste	7.0/10
PopMatters	7/10
Under the Radar	7/10 stars

According to the review aggregator Metacritic, Pyramid received "generally favorable reviews" based on a weighted average score of 75 out of 100 from 8 critic scores.

Paul Simpson of AllMusic stated, "While just as brainy and elaborate as Jaga Jazzist's other albums, Pyramid is the sound of the group letting themselves go and following their instincts, arriving at some of their most unbound, easily enjoyable material." Saby Reyes-Kulkarni of Paste commented that "while Pyramid is what we might call an easy listen, it also harbors a wealth of details as the band shifts ever so gracefully between active, upbeat grooves and motionlessness."

Meanwhile, Daniel Sylvester of Exclaim! described Pyramid as "an imperfect and uneven album that satisfies two different audiences, as the front half is packed with wandering jam band noodling while the second half tightens into a slightly more focused and rhythmic set." He added, "It's just a shame that Jaga Jazzist wasn't able to give the listener a more cohesive and unified version of what they were trying to achieve with Pyramid." Janne Oinonen of The Line of Best Fit stated, "While still offering glimmers of Jaga Jazzist's undefinable, futuristic aspirations, the maximalist ethos of Pyramid ultimately comes across as oddly old-fashioned at a time when acts like 75 Dollar Bill are redefining the hypnotic potential of instrumental soundscapes."

== Track listing ==
All tracks are written by Lars Horntveth.

Pyramid track listing
No.	Title	Length
1.	"Tomita"	13:47
2.	"Spiral Era"	8:09
3.	"The Shrine"	9:06
4.	"Apex"	8:09
Total length:		39:08

== Personnel ==
Credits adapted from liner notes.

Jaga Jazzist

- Marcus Forsgren – electric guitar, vocals, production, recording, mixing
- Lars Horntveth – guitar, pedal steel guitar, clarinet, saxophone, keyboards, synthesizer, vibraphone, piano, programming, arrangement, production, recording
- Even Ormestad – bass guitar, recording
- Line Horntveth – tuba, alto horn, euphonium, flute, vocals
- Erik Johannessen – tronbone, vocals
- Martin Horntveth – drums, percussion, programming
- Øystein Moen – synthesizer, Clavinet, Hammond organ
- Andreas Mjøs – vibraphone, chef

Additional musicians

- David Wallumrød – ARP Pro Soloist (on "Tomita")

Technical personnel

- George Tanderø – mastering
- Martin Kvamme – design
- Anthony P. Huus – photography

== Charts ==
Chart performance for Pyramid
Chart (2020)	Peak position
UK Independent Albums (OCC)	47
