= The Stix =

Studio album by Jaga Jazzist
- Released: 6 May 2003
- Genre: Post-rock, progressive rock, future jazz, jazz fusion
- Length: 53:14
- Label: Ninja Tune, Warner Music Norway, Beat Records (Japan), Sound Improvement (Poland)
- Producer: Jørgen Træen

Jaga Jazzist chronology
| A Livingroom Hush (2002) | The Stix (2003) | What We Must (2005) |

Professional ratings
Review scores
| Source | Rating |
|---|---|
| AllMusic | 4.5/5 stars |
| Sputnikmusic | 4.5/5 stars |
| Pitchfork | 6.6/10 stars |
| All About Jazz | positive |
| Tiny Mix Tapes | 3.0/5 stars |
| Rate Your Music | 3.5/5 stars |
| BBC | positive |

The Stix is the third studio album by the Norwegian band Jaga Jazzist. It was released on 6 May 2003 by Ninja Tune to positive reviews.

== Recording ==
- All songs produced by Jørgen Træen.
- Recorded by Jørgen Træen in Duper, summer 2001 and in Waterfall Studio, spring 2002.
- Mixed by Jørgen Træen with Lars Hornveth, Martin Horntveth and Andreas Mjøs in Duper, summer 2002.
- Mastered by Ingar Hunskaar at Strype Audio.
- Graphic design by Kim Hiorthøy.

== Personnel ==
- Harald Frøland – guitar, FX, synthesizer
- Andreas Mjøs – vibraphone, Omnichord, keyboards
- Martin Horntveth – drums, synth-drums, drum-machines, keyboards
- Jørgen Munkeby – flute, clarinet, harmonica, glockenspiel, keyboards
- Line Horntveth – tuba, melodica
- Lars Horntveth – tenor & baryton saxophone, flute, clarinet, bass clarinette, acoustic & electric guitars, keyboards
- Even Ormestad – bass, keyboards
- Lars Wabø – trombone
- Mathias Eick – trumpet, double bass, percussion, keyboards
- Morten Qvenild – synthesizer, piano, cassette tape-recorder

Additional personnel

- Jørgen Træen – electronics, drum programming
- Silje Haugan – violin
- Kjell Åge Stoveland – viola

== Track listing ==
All songs performed and arranged by Jaga Jazzist with Jørgen Træen.

| No. | Title | Writer(s) | Strings composed by | Length |
|---|---|---|---|---|
| 1. | "Kitty Wú" | Lars Horntveth; Glockenspiel + Vibraphone Theme – Jørgen Munkeby | Jørgen Træen, Lars Horntveth | 4:36 |
| 2. | "Day" | Martin Horntveth | | 3:08 |
| 3. | "Another Day" | Lars Horntveth | | 3:30 |
| 4. | "Suomi Finland" | Lars Horntveth; Rhodes + Vibraphone Theme – Andreas Mjøs, Jørgen Munkeby | | 7:28 |
| 5. | "Aerial Bright Dark Round" | Morten Qvenild | Lars Horntveth, Morten Qvenild | 5:08 |
| 6. | "Reminders" | Lars Horntveth | | 5:21 |
| 7. | "Toxic Dart" | Jørgen Munkeby, Lars Horntveth | | 6:45 |
| 8. | "I Could Have Killed Him In The Sauna" | Lars Horntveth; Flute part by Jørgen Munkeby | Jørgen Træen, Lars Horntveth | 5:34 |
| 9. | "Doppelganger" | Jørgen Munkeby; Vibraphone theme by Mathias Eick | | 4:47 |
| 10. | "The Stix" | Lars Horntveth; Piano + Harmonica Theme – Jørgen Munkeby, Lars Horntveth | | 6:57 |
| Total length: | | | | 53:14 |
