= Horntveth =

Horntveth is a surname. Notable people with the surname include:

- Lars Horntveth (born 1980), Norwegian musician, band leader, and composer
- Line Horntveth (born 1974), Norwegian musician, sister of Martin and Lars
- Martin Horntveth (born 1977), Norwegian musician, composer, and electronica artist
