= Starfire (Jaga Jazzist album) =

2015 studio album by Jaga Jazzist

Studio album by Jaga Jazzist
- Released: June 1, 2015
- Genre: Post-rock, progressive rock, future jazz, jazz fusion
- Length: 49:53
- Label: Ninja Tune
- Producer: Lars Horntveth and Jørgen Træen

Jaga Jazzist chronology
Live with Britten Sinfonia (2013)	Starfire (2015)

Professional ratings
Review scores
Source	Rating
AllMusic	3.5/5 stars
The Guardian	3.0/5 stars
Metacritic	8.2/10 stars
Drowned in Sound	8.0/10 stars
Resident Advisor	3.0/5 stars
Consequence of Sound	positive

Starfire is the sixth studio album by the Norwegian band Jaga Jazzist. It was released 1 June 2015 by Ninja Tune to positive reviews.

== Recording ==
- All songs produced by Lars Horntveth and Jørgen Træen except Big City Music co-produced by Marcus Forsgren.
- Arranged by Lars Hornveth and Jaga Jazzist.
- Mixed by Jørgen Træen in Duper.
- Mastered by Greg Calbi.
- Recorded by Lars Horntveth in Pooka Studio (Oslo/Los Angeles), Jørgen Træen and Marcus Forsgren in EngfeltForsgren Studio (Oslo), Even Ormestad in Albatross Recorders (Oslo) and Martin Horntveth in Wallpaper (Oslo).

== Personnel ==
- Marcus Forsgren - Electric guitar, synthesizers, programming and vocals
- Lars Horntveth - guitars, lap steel guitar, clarinets, saxophones, flute, synthesizers, bass guitar, programming, piano and vocals
- Even Ormestad - bass guitar and bass synthesizer
- Line Horntveth - tuba, flute, glockenspiel, euphonium and vocals
- Erik Johannessen - trombone and vocals
- Martin Horntveth - drums, typatune, tubular bells, percussion and programming
- Øystein Moen - synthesizers, programming, piano and Hammond Organ
- Andreas Mjos - vibraphone, guitar and synthesizers

== Track listing ==
All tracks written by Lars Hornveth.

No.	Title	Length
1.	"Starfire"	8:47
2.	"Big City Music"	14:07
3.	"Shinkansen"	7:43
4.	"Oban"	12:41
5.	"Prungen"	6:35
Total length:		49:53

== Artwork ==
The album's artwork is by Martin Kvamme. It is in the permanent collection of the National Museum of Norway.
