= Ekko av Ibsen =

2006 Norwegian short film series

Ekko av Ibsen is a series of eight short films that were shown on NRK in autumn 2006. Norwegian Film Fund and NRK arranged in 2004 a script-writing conference that were based on texts by Henrik Ibsen. In 2004, 16 of 250 submitted projects were given kr 20,000 to further develop their projects. In 2005, eight 28-minute films were chosen; six were awarded kr 1,500,000 from the Norwegian Film Fund and the others were financed and produced by NRK.

== Films ==
Title	Writer	Director	Producer	Starring	Original text	Screening date, NRK	Ref
Edderkoppfest	Arild Østin Ommundsen, Tore Renberg	Arild Østin Ommundsen	Muzfilm AS	Marko Iversen Kanic, Silje Salomonsen, Vegar Hoel, Ulla Marie Broch	Et Dukkehjem	20 April 2006	
Terje Vigen	Tarje Holtvedt, Mari Monrad Vistven, Anders Hofseth	Mari Monrad Vistven, Vidar Magnussen	NRK	Fridtjov Såheim, Ingrid Bolsø Berdal	Terje Vigen	27 April 2006	
Klippan i livet – Kan jeg leve uten?	Pia Lykke, Line Grünfeld, Linn Skåber	Pia Lykke	Monster AS Production	Jannike Kruse, Trond Fausa Aurvåg, Ingar Helge Gimle, Brit Elisabeth Haagensli, Linn Skåber	Peer Gynt, Little Eyolf, The Lady from the Sea, Ghosts	4 May 2006	
Dobbel salto	Lars Göran Petterson	Lars Göran Petterson	Original Film	Stig Henrik Hoff, Ester Marie Myrvang Grenersen. Per Christian Ellefsen	Bygmester Solness	8 June 2006	
Nora	Kristin Skogheim	Geir Henning Hopland	Paradox AS	Kristin Zachariassen, Trine Wiggen, Charlotte Frogner	A Doll's House	15 June 2006	
Kjøter	Bjørn Olaf Johannessen	Marius Holst	4 ½ AS	Hildegun Riise, Bjørn Floberg	Et Dukkehjem	11 May 2006	
Trøbbel	Dag Johan Haugerud	Dag Johan Haugerud	Motlys AS	Henriette Steenstrup, Anne Marit Jacobsen, Johannes Kunke, Kai von der Lippe	A Doll's House	25 May 2006	
Hvis jeg faller	Jens M. Johansson, Johanne Helgeland	Johanne Helgeland	NRK	Marika Lagercrantz	Aksel Hennie, Svein Tindberg	November 19 2006	
