= What We Must =

Studio album by Jaga Jazzist
- Released: April 25, 2005
- Recorded: July–December 2004
- Studio: Piethopraxis, Germany; Propeller Music Division, Norway; Uphon Studios, Germany
- Genre: Post-rock, ambient electronica, jazz fusion
- Length: 46:00
- Label: Ninja Tune
- Producer: Kåre Christoffer Vestrheim, Marcus Schmickler

Jaga Jazzist chronology
The Stix (2003)	What We Must (2005)	One-Armed Bandit (2010)

Professional ratings
Review scores
Source	Rating
Pitchfork Media	7.7/10
Sputnikmusic	5/5
BBC	positive
rockmusicreview	9.5/10

What We Must is the fourth studio album by the Norwegian band Jaga Jazzist. It was released 25 April 2005 by Ninja Tune.

== Recording ==
The album was produced by Kåre Christoffer Vestrheim and Marcus Schmickler. It was recorded by Mario Thaler in Uphon Studios, Germany July 2004, by Marcus Schmickler in Piethopraxis, Germany August 2004 and by Mike Hartung and Kåre Christoffer Vestrheim in Propeller Music Division, Norway October–December 2004. Mixed by Kåre Christoffer Vestrheim and Mike Hartung in Propeller Music Division, December 2004. Mastered by Mike Hartung in Propeller Music Division.

Design of the album by Kim Hiorthøy and, to lesser extent, by Harald Frøland and Andreas Hessen Schei.

The title of the album was borrowed from a fanzine for Nieves Publishers.

== Reception ==
Sputnikmusic included the album in their list of top albums of 2005, at #52.

== Track listing ==
All music arranged by Jaga Jazzist with Kåre Christoffer Vestrheim and Marcus Schmickler.

No.	Title	Writer(s)	Length
1.	"All I Know Is Tonight"	Lars Horntveth, Andreas Hessen Schei	7:40
2.	"Stardust Hotel"	Jørgen Munkeby, Lars Horntveth, Mathias Eick	6:28
3.	"For All You Happy People"	Andreas Mjøs, Lars Horntveth	3:58
4.	"Oslo Skyline"	Lars Horntveth	5:31
5.	"Swedenborgske Rom"	Andreas Hessen Schei	8:46
6.	"Mikado"	Lars Horntveth	5:57
7.	"I Have A Ghost, Now What?"	Lars Horntveth	7:32
Total length:			46:00

== Personnel ==
- Mathias Eick - trumpet, upright bass, vibraphone, keyboards, solina strings, vocals
- Ketil Vestrum Einarsen - flute, alto flute, toy sax, wind controller
- Harald Frøland - guitars and effects
- Lars Horntveth - guitars, Bb clarinet, bass-clarinet, soprano sax, Mellotron, keyboards, lap steel, glockenspiel, tamboura, vocals
- Line Horntveth - tuba, percussion, vocals
- Martin Horntveth - drums, percussion, gong, vocals
- Andreas Mjøs - guitars, vibraphone, Omnichords, marimba, percussion, glockenspiel
- Even Ormestad - bass, SH-101, baritone guitar, piano, marimba
- Andreas Hessen Schei - Synthesizers, Fender Rhodes, Wurlitzer, piano, Mellotron, vocals
- Lars Wabø - trombone, euphonium

Additional sound

- Kåre Christoffer Vestrheim - keyboards, Theremin, percussion
