= A Livingroom Hush =

Studio album by Jaga Jazzist
- Released: 2001
- Genre: Jazztronica
- Length: 48:55
- Label: Smalltown Supersound
- Producer: Jørgen Træen

Jaga Jazzist chronology
Jævla Jazzist Grete Stitz (1996)	A Livingroom Hush (2001)	The Stix (2002)

A Livingroom Hush is the second album of Jaga Jazzist, released in 2001 by Ninja Tune under the authority of the Warner Music Group. The BBC named it the best jazz album of 2002. The album features ten instrumental songs, most of which were composed by Lars Horntveth and Jørgen Munkeby.

Professional ratings
Review scores
Source	Rating
Allmusic	4/5 stars
Dagbladet	5/6 stars

== Reception ==
The Allmusic review awarded the album four out of five stars and review by the Norwegian newspaper Dagbladet awarded the album five out of six stars (dice).

== Track listing ==
No.	Title	Length
1.	"Animal Chin"	4:07
2.	"Going Down"	5:20
3.	"Press Play"	1:06
4.	"Airborne"	5:13
5.	"Real Racecars Have Doors"	4:15
6.	"Low Battery"	5:50
7.	"Midget"	2:32
8.	"Made For Radio"	5:22
9.	"Lithuania"	8:37
10.	"Cinematic"	6:24

== Credits ==
Performed by Jaga Jazzist

- Mathias Eick - trumpet, keyboards, double bass
- Lars Horntveth - tenor & baritone saxophone, flute, bass-clarinet, acoustic, high-string guitar, keyboards
- Lars Wabø - trombone
- Line Horntveth - tuba
- Andreas Mjøs - vibraphone, marimba, percussions, drums, keyboards
- Jørgen Munkeby - flute, tenor saxophone, bass-clarinet, keyboards
- Harald Frøland - guitar, effects, synthesizer
- Morten Qvenild - keyboards
- Ivar Chr. Johansen - keyboards
- Even Ormestad - bass, keyboards
- Martin Horntveth - drums, drum programming (drum-machines), percussion, keyboards
- Jørgen Træen - electronics, keyboards, percussion, synthesizer (Ms-20 Ghost)

Production

- Mastering – Audun Strype, Ingar Hunskaar
- Mixing – Andreas Mjøs
- Mixing, all string arrangements – Lars Horntveth
- Mixing – Martin Horntveth
- Artworks (sleeve - shape/color) – Martin Horntveth, Christian@stateroom
- Photography – Colin Eick
- Producer, Recording, Mixing – Jørgen Træen

== Notes ==
Recorded in Duper Studios, Spring 2000. Mixed Summer 2000. Mastered at Strype Audio.
