= Ostin =

Ostin or Østin is a surname. Notable people with the surname include:

- Arild Østin Ommundsen (born 1969), Norwegian film director and screenwriter
- Michael Ostin (fl. 1978–2019), American music industry executive, producer, talent manager and entrepreneur, child of Mo Ostin
- Mo Ostin (1927–2022), American record executive, Rock and Roll Hall of Fame inductee, parent of Michael Ostin
- Silje Salomonsen (full name Silje Østin Salomonsen, born 1978), Norwegian actress and musician
