= Monster Thursday =

2004 Norwegian film directed by Arild Østin Ommundsen

Monstertorsdag
- Directed by: Arild Østin Ommundsen
- Written by: Gro Elin Hjelle; Arild Østin Ommundsen
- Produced by: Ingrid Festøy Ottesen
- Starring: Silje Salomonsen
- Cinematography: Trond Høines
- Edited by: Erik Andersson
- Music by: Nils Erga (Noxagt); Thomas Dybdahl
- Release date: October 15, 2004
- Running time: 103 minutes
- Country: Norway
- Language: Norwegian

Monstertorsdag (Monster Thursday) is a Norwegian film from 2004. The film was directed by Arild Østin Ommundsen. It was made by largely the same Stavanger-affiliated crew that made Mongoland. The project also brought in the Danish actors Kim Bodnia and Iben Hjejle. The film takes place in a surfing environment in Jæren and in Stavanger. On "Monster Thursday," the perfect wave will arrive. The film is about a quirky love triangle between a surfer, his carpenter's best friend, and the surfer's wife (played by Silje Salomonsen), who was previously married to the carpenter, Even (played by Vegar Hoel)

== Reception ==
The film received a "die throw" of 4 in Dagsavisen, in Dagbladet, in Adresseavisen, in Bergens Tidende, VG, Nordlys, and 5 in Aftenposten.

== Plot ==
The story begins as Skip (Kim Bodnia) is proudly telling a boy about the only surfer who rode a "monstrous" wave during a storm. When the boy asks when this happened, Skip answers that it was long, long ago....

The story now shifts to a remote coastal Norwegian town. The audience is immediately introduced to Even. Even is a carpenter who has an uncanny tendency for surviving violent situations with barely getting a scratch. He is well dressed but is lounging at a bar and appears unhappy. Even is the best man for his best friend's wedding, Tord (Christian Skolmen). He arrives late with the rings, but Tord forgives him and the wedding ceremony goes under way. From the ceremony to the reception, Even behaves tense and awkwardly. The audience finally learns some background information when Even is asked to give a speech; during that speech, he recounts how he met the bride, Karen (Silja Salomonsen) in Italy. They returned to Norway and married. Then Karen met Tord, Even's more successful and athletic best friend, divorced Even, and married Tord, eventually becoming pregnant with Tord's child. As he says all of this, he creates an awkward moment for the guests. Tord confronts Even for his daring monologue, but Even simply says "You stole her from me".

A short while later, Tord needs to travel, and requests that Even take care and help out of the heavily pregnant Karen while he's gone. It is during this time where Karen and Even begin to become close to one another again. Even wants to impress Karen, and takes up surfing with the intention of participating in a local tournament. It is here where he meets Skip (Kim Bodnia). Skip is a retired surfer, and was apparently extremely talented. One problem is that Skip is gruff, aloof, and reluctant to train an adult. Even manages to convince Skip to teach him how to surf, whilst he develops a relationship with Karen. Skip also gradually warms up to Even.

In one of the more enigmatic scenes in the film, Tord calls Karen and tells her that he will not return to Norway. Even sympathizes with Karen, but secretly rejoices. However, Tord unexpectedly returns one day. To make matters worse for Even, the tournament is cancelled due to inclement weather conditions. It turns out that a huge, monstrous wave is expected. Even, lamenting the fact that his life was rather shiftless and uneventful, decides to risk his life and ride the wave during the storm. He goes out to the shore the night of the storm, and rides the wave, as an awe-struck Skip looks on. Even loses his life as soon as the wave crashes down. Coincidentally, Karen is giving birth to a boy at the moment this is happening. Karen and Tord decide to name the child Even.

The final scenes shift back to Skip and the young boy, who happens to be Karen and Tord's son. The final scene shows a young Even riding a wave as his parents and Skip proudly look on.

== Cast ==
- Vegar Hoel as Even
- Silje Salomonsen as Karen
- Andreas Cappelen as Beckstrøm
- Kim Bodnia as Skip
- Iben Hjejle as Sara
- Christian Skolmen as Tord
- Siri Kalvig as the weather woman
- Pia Tjelta as the Russian potato seller
- Marko Iversen Kanic
- Kristoffer Joner as the doctor
- Lasse August Dørum Backer as little Even
