= Hugo Mikal Skår =

Norwegian actor (born 1978)

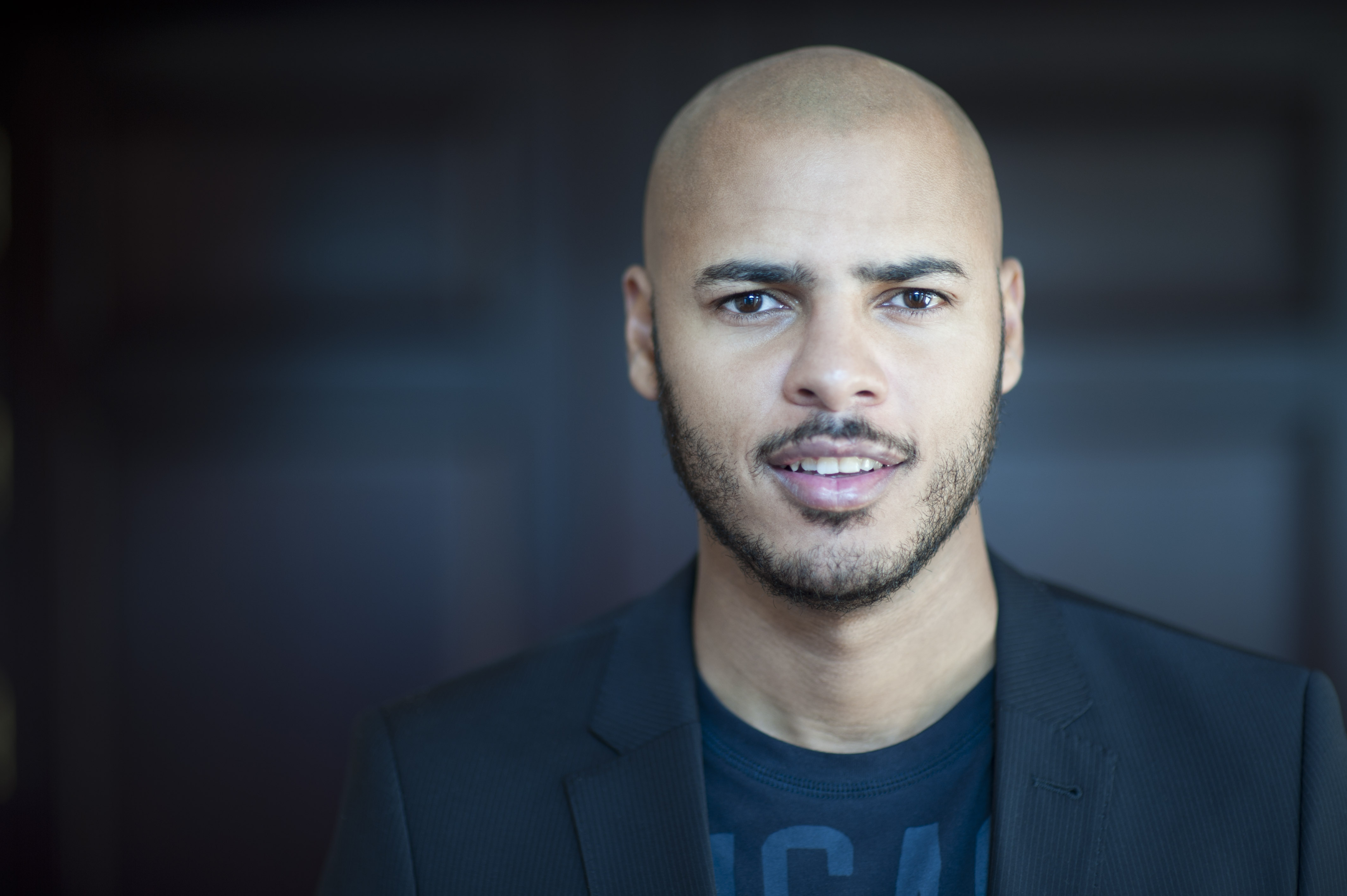
- Born: 27 October 1978 (age 47); Lisbon
- Occupation: Actor
- Years active: 2004–present

Hugo Mikal Skår (born 27 October 1978) is a Norwegian actor.

== Education ==
Skår is a graduate of the Nordic Institute of Stage and Studio (NISS) in Oslo, where he spent three years in acting school. Skår has been studying method acting since 2006 to the tradition of Lee Strasberg.

== Career ==
Skår started as a production assistant in the film Monster Thursday (2003), then he got the role as Goddy in musical Fame (2004). Skår had attended acting school from 2005 to 2008.

Skår worked at Regionteatret i Møre og Romsdal, better known as Teatret Vårt from 2008 until the end of 2010. In spring 2008 Skår debuted in Sigurd Slembe and Arabian Nights for Teatret Vårt. Skår has also done roles in, among other things, Det regner aske, Presidentinnene and Invasion!, which was nominated for a Hedda Award in 2009. He also played the title role Othello which also got nominated for a Hedda Award. In 2011 startet to work in Rogaland Teater until 2014, then skår started work at Teatret Vårt until 2019. In 2021 and 2022 skår will play in two movies. In 2022 Hugo started working at Den Nationale Scene.

== Theatre ==
=== Acting ===
- 2025: As It Is In Heaven
- 2025: shame
- 2025: The guest
- 2024: The Crucible
- 2024: Menn som ingen treng
- 2024: Billy Elliot
- 2023: Kjøkkenet er hjemmets hjerte
- 2023: Romeo and Juliet
- 2023: Come from Away
- 2021: Othello
- 2019: A Streetcar Named Desire
- 2019: Death of a Salesman
- 2018: Maraton dance
- 2017: Kiss of the Spider Woman
- 2016: Othello
- 2015: The Curious Incident of the Dog in the Night-Time
- 2014: The Black Rider
- 2013: All's Well That Ends Well
- 2013: Shoot/Get Treasure/Repeat
- 2012: Oh My God
- 2012: Festen
- 2011: Sonny
- 2010: Daniel 33
- 2010: Hele norges bennus
- 2010: Over ævne II
- 2009: Taremareby
- 2009: Presidentinnene
- 2009: Cutting Torch
- 2009: It's Raining Ash
- 2008: Invasion
- 2008: Sigurd Slembe
- 2008: Arabian Nights
- 2007: Festen
- 2004: Fame

== Film ==
- 2024: De Gjenvendte
- 2022: Troll
- 2012: Hotel Cæsar
- 2008: The Whore
- 2003: Monster Thursday
