= One-Armed Bandit (album) =

2010 studio album by Jaga Jazzist

Studio album by Jaga Jazzist
- Released: January 25, 2010
- Genre: Post-rock, progressive rock, future jazz, jazz fusion
- Label: Ninja Tune

Jaga Jazzist chronology
What We Must (2005)	One-Armed Bandit (2010)	Live with Britten Sinfonia (2013)

Professional ratings
Review scores
Source	Rating
AllMusic	3.5/5 stars
The A.V. Club	(A−)
BBC	(positive)
Clash	(8/10)
Drowned in Sound	(9/10)
MusicOMH	5/5 stars
No Ripcord	5/5 stars
Pitchfork Media	(6.9/10)
The Times	4/5 stars
Tiny Mix Tapes	4/5 marks

One-Armed Bandit is the fifth studio album by the Norwegian band Jaga Jazzist. It was released January 25, 2010 by Ninja Tune to positive reviews. Compared to their earlier work, it features a substantial progressive rock influence. Different editions of the album carry different fruit symbols on the front cover.

== Personnel ==
- Lars Horntveth - Clarinet, Flute, Guitar, Piano, Clarinet (Bass), Keyboards, Programming, Sax (Baritone), Sax (Soprano), Sax (Tenor), Lap Steel Guitar
- Martin Horntveth - Percussion, Drums, Programming, Bells, Psaltery, Drum Machine, Temple - Blocks, Marxophone, Mandolin Harp
- Mathias Eick - Piano, Trumpet, French Horn, Keyboards, Bass (Upright)
- Line Horntveth - Flute, Percussion, Tuba, Glockenspiel, Vocals
- Erik Johannessen - Trombone, Marxophone
- Andreas Mjos - Guitar, Percussion, Glockenspiel, Marimba, Vibraphone
- Øystein Moen - Organ, Synthesizer, Percussion, Piano
- Even Ormestad - Bass, Percussion, Glockenspiel, Keyboards
- Stian Westerhus - Percussion, Guitar (Electric), Harp, Guitar (12 String), Effects, Guitar (Baritone)

== Track listing ==
1. "The Thing Introduces..."
2. "One-Armed Bandit"
3. "Bananfluer overalt"
4. "220 V/Spektral"
5. "Toccata"
6. "Prognissekongen"
7. "Book of Glass"
8. "Music! Dance! Drama!"
9. "Touch of Evil"
10. "Endless Galaxy" (available only on LP & Japanese bonus track)
