= Eventyr (disambiguation) =

Eventyr may refer to

- Eventyr, a 1981 studio album
- Eventyr (Once Upon a Time), a 1917 symphonic poem
- Eventyrland, a 2013 film
- Eventyrfjelde, a group of nunataks in Queen Louise Land, Greenland
