= The National Bank (band) =

Norwegian rock/pop band

- Origin: Oslo, Norway
- Genres: Rock and pop music
- Years active: 2003–present
- Members: Lars Horntveth; Morten Qvenild; Thomas Dybdahl; Nikolai Eilertsen; Martin Horntveth
- Website: The National Bank Official Website

The National Bank is a Norwegian rock/pop band, whose debut album was released in Norway in 2004 and featured the hit song "Tolerate".

They came together in 2003, initially only to perform a one-time show commissioned by Vestfoldspillene music festival, one of the Norway's music festivals, and later as a band proper. Formed around the talents of brothers Lars and Martin Horntveth, who also happen to be the main driving force behind the highly successful and unique Norwegian electronica/jazz/post-rock combo Jaga Jazzist, the band features musicians already well known in their native country, from such bands as Jaga Jazzist and BigBang, and singer-songwriter Thomas Dybdahl on vocals, the band is often referred to as a "supergroup" in Norway.

Although closely connected to the band Jaga Jazzist, their music is completely different. The National Bank explore musical landscapes in more pop/rock oriented manners, with a focus on vocal-oriented orchestrated pop music suitable for the big stage. Their first single, "Tolerate" (2004), later released on the album The National Bank (2004), became an instant hit in Norway, and upon release was proclaimed by many Norwegian music critics to be the best Norwegian song of the year.

Despite the grand success, all members continued their separate careers, yet there was talk of some work on writing and recording new material, and by 2007 all five members finally found the time to get together in the studio. The first new single, "Let Go" (2007), played on radio with an announcement that the second album, Come On Over To The Other Side, would be seen in the spring 2008 release. They did perform a number of successful shows around in Norway, but all the band members subsequently returned to their primary outfits. To support another massive success, The National Bank toured Norway, Germany, Denmark, Belgium, and the Netherlands for the rest of the winter 2008/09.

== Band members ==
- Lars Horntveth (guitar and bass clarinet)
- Morten Qvenild (keyboards and Auto-harp)
- Thomas Dybdahl (lead vocals and guitar)
- Nikolai Eilertsen (bass and harmony vocals)
- Martin Horntveth (drums and harmony vocals)

== Discography ==
- The National Bank (2004)
- Come On Over to the Other Side (2008)

== The National Bank (album) ==
The National Bank

Studio album by The National Bank
- Released: 2004
- Recorded: 2004
- Genre: Pop
- Length: 43:28

The National Bank chronology
The National Bank (2004)	Come On Over To The Other Side (2008)

The National Bank is the eponymous debut studio album released by the Norwegian band The National Bank.

== Track listing ==
1. I Hear The Sparrow Sing
2. Tolerate
3. Hello, My Name is Fred
4. A Recorder in Red Plastic
5. Blue As We Like It
6. What is Left?
7. Look Twice
8. The National Bank
9. Half Blind

Awards
Preceded by Ephemera	Recipient of the best Pop band Spellemannprisen; 2004	Succeeded by Röyksopp
