= Stray Dogs (album) =

Studio album by Thomas Dybdahl
- Released: 2003 (Norway); 2005 (Europe)
- Recorded: 2003
- Genre: Pop/Rock
- Length: 50:02
- Label: CCAP/EMI

Thomas Dybdahl chronology
...that great October sound (2002)	Stray Dogs (2003)	One day you'll dance for me, New York City (2004)

Professional ratings
Review scores
Source	Rating
NRK	8/10 stars
Verdens gang	6/6 stars

Stray Dogs is the second album released by the Norwegian singer/songwriter Thomas Dybdahl.

== Track listing ==
1. "Rain down on me"
2. "Cecilia"
3. "Make a mess of yourself"
4. "Pale green eyes"
5. "Either way I'm gone"
6. "Honey"
7. "Rise in shame"
8. "Stray dogs"
9. "The willow"
10. "Stay home"
11. "Outro"

== Charts ==
Chart (2003)	Peak position
Norwegian Albums (VG-lista)	6
