= Red (2008 film) =

- Theatrical release poster
- Directed by: Trygve Allister Diesen; Lucky McKee
- Screenplay by: Stephen Susco
- Based on: Red by Jack Ketchum
- Produced by: Steve Blair; Trygve Allister Diesen; Norman Dreyfuss
- Starring: Brian Cox; Tom Sizemore
- Cinematography: Harald Gunnar Paalgard
- Edited by: Jon Endre Mørk
- Music by: Søren Hyldgaard
- Production companies: Billy Goat Pictures; Tenk
- Distributed by: Magnolia Pictures
- Release dates: January 20, 2008 (Sundance); August 8, 2008 (United States)
- Running time: 93 minutes
- Country: United States
- Language: English
- Box office: $10,731

Red is a 2008 American thriller film based on a novel by Jack Ketchum and directed by Trygve Allister Diesen and Lucky McKee. It concerns one man's revenge after his beloved dog is shot to death when he does not have enough money to satisfy an attempted robber. The screenplay was written by Stephen Susco based on the novel. It premiered at the Sundance Film Festival in 2008.

== Plot ==
Avery "Ave" Ludlow, a storekeeper, has a dog named Red, a gift for his 50th birthday from his late wife, Mary. One day, fishing at a lake with Red by his side, three boys come along: brothers Danny and Harold McCormack and their friend Pete Doust. Danny threatens Ave with a shotgun and demands money. When Avery says he has only $30, Danny becomes furious and kills Red. He laughs and jokes about it as he leaves with the other boys.

Ave visits a gun store, where the clerk identifies Danny as the shotgun purchaser based on a description. Ave visits Danny's father Michael and tells his story. Michael summons his sons and asks them if they shot Red. They deny it, and Michael tells Ave to leave.

Ave decides to ask for a prosecution and talks to his lawyer, Sam Berry. Sam discourages him by saying that the penalty is low, but Ave persists. Sam arranges a meeting between Ave and a reporter named Carrie. Carrie tells him that publicity would prompt official action. Ave agrees and gives a human-interest television interview to Carrie. However, the story fails to get attention except for a rock with a threatening message thrown through Ave's window. Carrie is transferred to another story while Ave pursues a civil lawsuit for damages.

Carrie asks Ave about his family; he tells her his elder son was mendacious and was thrown out of the Navy due to mental illness. One day, he returned home and asked his mother for money. She refused, and he assaulted her. Thinking he had killed her, he set fire to his brother and mother with kerosene. The brother died at the scene while Mary survived for five days in a coma before dying.

Ave begins following the boys. Harold sees Ave watching them and, remorseful, apologizes. Ave says he would like Danny to do likewise. One day, Danny is playing baseball with friends and becomes frustrated after striking out, leaving the game in anger with his brother and Pete. Ave follows them and parks behind their car. Danny confronts him and, needled by Ave, tries to hit him with his bat. Ave parries the blow and knocks Danny down; Ave points out that, as Danny attacked in daylight with witnesses, he should watch his temper, saying the beating Ave has given him is one his father should have administered. Shortly after, Ave's store burns down. No evidence implicates the McCormacks, but Pete's parents suddenly have enough money to repair their dilapidated house.

Ave exhumes Red and takes him to the McCormacks' house, confronting them with the dog's corpse. Michael and Danny brandish pistols, demanding Ave leave. When Ave refuses, Danny steps forward and aims at Ave. Ave deflects Danny's arm as he fires, and the shot hits Ave's ear. Ave wrestles Danny's gun from him, throws him to the ground at gunpoint, and tells Michael to lower his gun. Ave forces Danny to drive to the sheriff, where he intends to have Danny charged with attempted manslaughter. Michael follows Ave and rams his truck off the road. The McCormacks return home, thinking Ave is dead.

Night falls and Ave regains consciousness. He finds Danny's revolver in the wreckage and returns to the McCormack house, where he meets a shaken Harold on the porch. Ave asks Harold to be taken to Red's body, but Michael, Danny, and Pete follow them. Michael and Danny are again armed; Harold tells them to stand down, but Danny shoots Ave in the belly with the shotgun. Ave returns fire, wounding both Danny and Michael. As they fall, they fire back: in the crossfire, Harold and Pete are fatally shot. Ave approaches the injured Danny and Michael, telling the father that Harold is dead.

As he recuperates, Ave reads a newspaper with Carrie's account of his story. Carrie visits, tells him that she has been offered a job in New York as a result of the article, and gives him a dog. Ave initially declines, reminding her that two boys were killed because he refused to give up; however, she leaves him with the dog. Despite his protests, Ave soon accepts her offer.

== Cast ==
- Brian Cox as Avery "Ave" Ludlow
- Kyle Gallner as Harold McCormack
- Noel Fisher as Danny McCormack
- Tom Sizemore as Michael McCormack
- Shiloh Fernandez as Pete Doust
- Robert Englund as Willie Doust
- Amanda Plummer as Mrs. Doust
- Ashley Laurence as Mrs. McCormack
- Kim Dickens as Carrie
- Richard Riehle as Sam Berry
- Jack Ketchum as Bartender (credited under his real name, Dallas Mayr)

== Awards and nominations ==
Brian Cox won for Best Actor at the Sitges Film Festival. Red was also nominated for Best Film (Trygve Allister Diesen, Lucky McKee).

== Reception ==
On Rotten Tomatoes the film holds an approval rating of 71% based on 28 reviews, with an average rating of 6.2/10. The site's critical consensus reads, "This vengeance film leans heavily on attack-and-avenge scenarios but performances by Brian Cox and Tom Sizemore take the stink out of any weaker scripting." On Metacritic the film has a weighted average score of 61 out of 100, based on 7 critics, indicating "generally favorable reviews".

Several critics praised Brian Cox's performance as elevating the film beyond its modest production values. Mark Olsen of the Los Angeles Times described the film as "an elegant and deceptively straightforward dramatic thriller." Film Journal International commended the film’s emotional depth and Cox’s portrayal, writing that it "invests this simple, straightforward narrative with an understated passion that is unforgettable." Some reviewers noted tonal inconsistencies and underdeveloped supporting characters, but the central performance and themes of justice and grief were generally well received.
