= Hombres =

Norwegian-Swedish drama series

- Genre: Drama
- Created by: Henrik Jansson; Jan Zachrisson
- Written by: Henrik Jansson; Jan Zachrisson; Thomas Borgstrøm; Karin Gidfors; Morgan Jensen
- Starring: Emil Forselius; Christian Hillborg; Christian Wennberg; Tito Pencheff; Christian Skolmen; Ola Wahlstrøm
- Composer: Krister Linder
- Countries of origin: Norway; Sweden
- Original languages: Norwegian; Swedish
- No. of seasons: 1
- No. of episodes: 8

Production
- Producers: Kerstin Andersson; Axel Eriksson
- Running time: 60 minutes (Including commercials)
- Production company: Jarowskij

Original release
- Network: TVNorge; Kanal 5
- Release: 23 September 2006

Hombres is a Norwegian-Swedish drama series that aired on TVNorge during the winter of 2007 and on Kanal 5 the autumn of 2006.

== Plot ==
The criminal Pål Skogland has been sitting in prison, where he got information on 354 million he could get his hands on. Skogland puts together a team. He gets Manne af Ejderhorn, an upper class kid, and the two brothers Victor and Emil Carlberg. The two works in a financial company they are going to steal the money from. The 354 million is going to be transferred to a bank in Mallorca, Spain. Everything seems to be going their way until they arrive in Mallorca.

== Ratings ==
The series premiere had 177 000 viewers. In Sweden the premiere was watched by 160 000 viewers.
