= ...That Great October Sound =

...that great October sound

Studio album by Thomas Dybdahl
- Released: 2002
- Recorded: 2002
- Genre: Pop rock
- Label: Checkpoint Charlie Audio Productions

Thomas Dybdahl chronology
...that great October sound (2002)	Stray Dogs (2003)

...that great October sound is the first album released by Norwegian singer/songwriter Thomas Dybdahl.

== Track listing ==
1. "From Grace"
2. "All's Not Lost"
3. "That Great October Sound"
4. "Life Here Is Gold"
5. "Tomorrow Stays The Same"
6. "Postulate"
7. "Adelaide"
8. "John Wayne"
9. "Love's Lost"
10. "Dreamweaver"
11. "Outro"
12. "I Need Love Baby, Love, Not Trouble" (Bonus Track)
