= Silje Salomonsen =

Norwegian actress and musician (born 1978)

- Born: July 12, 1978 (age 47); Stavanger, Norway
- Occupations: Actress, musician, film director, screenwriter
- Spouse: Arild Østin Ommundsen

Silje Østin Salomonsen (born July 12, 1978) is a Norwegian actress and musician from Randaberg Municipality.

== Career ==
Salomonsen has had roles in the Norwegian feature films Monstertorsdag, Jonny Vang, Detektor, Mongoland, Now It's Dark, and Hjelperytteren. In 2009 she appeared in the film Rottenetter, directed by her husband Arild Østin Ommundsen. For the film Jernanger from 2009, she was casting manager, and for the short film Før solen står opp from 1999 she was an assistant prompter. She has also been a presenter on the television series U on NRK and worked at the Rogaland Theater, where, among other things, she took part in the production of Charles Dickens' Nicholas Nickleby. Together with her husband Arild Østin Ommundsen, she wrote and directed the children's film Tottori! Sommeren vi var alene from 2020, in which the couple's two daughters, ages nine and five, played the main roles. Together they were nominated for the 2021 Amanda Award in the category best director, and the film was nominated for best children's film and best music.

Salomonsen has been part of Thomas Dybdahl's backup band for a number of years. She also plays in the bands Attention Now!, Bright Paper Werewolves, and The Substitutes.

== Filmography ==
- 1998: Benny as Lise
- 2000: Detektor as Camilla's friend
- 2001: Mongoland as Silje
- 2003: Jonny Vang as Helene
- 2004: Monstertorsdag as Karen
- 2009: Rottenetter as Lydia
- 2013: Eventyrland as Jenny
- 2018: Now It's Dark as Lene
- 2014: Autumn Harvest (short)
- 2019: Hjelperytteren as Kim Karlsen
- 2022: Robin og Planeten (short) as the mother
