= One Day You'll Dance for Me, New York City =

One day you'll dance for me, New York City

Studio album by Thomas Dybdahl
- Released: 2004
- Genre: Singer-Songwriter, Rock
- Length: 38:21
- Label: CCAP/EMI

Thomas Dybdahl chronology
Stray Dogs (2003)	One day you'll dance for me, New York City (2004)	Science (2006)

One day you'll dance for me, New York City is an album released by the Norwegian singer–songwriter Thomas Dybdahl. The album has been praised by critics all over Scandinavia for its mellow beauty.

The album features Norwegian philosopher Arne Næss speaking of quality of life, as a sort of interlude.

== Track listing ==
1. "One Day You'll Dance for Me, New York City"
2. "If We Want It, It's Right"
3. "A Lovestory"
4. "Solitude"
5. "It's Always Been You"
6. "Don't Lose Yourself"
7. "Babe"
8. "Henry"
9. "Piece"
