= Trygve Allister Diesen =

Norwegian filmmaker

- Born: 11 July 1967 (age 59); Norway
- Education: USC School of Cinematic Arts
- Occupations: Film director, screenwriter

Trygve Allister Diesen (Trig Diesen) (born 11 July 1967 in Norway) is a TV and film director, producer, and screenwriter. He has mostly worked in Scandinavia and the US. He is partner in the Scandinavian production company tenk.tv.

Trygve Allister Diesen graduated from USC School of Cinematic Arts in Los Angeles. He started his professional career as a journalist in Kristiansand, Norway. Diesen has a comprehensive background in screenwriting and directing for film and TV, in Europe and the USA. He has also translated plays for theaters. In 2010, he was the first to be awarded a practice-based doctorate in directing from the Norwegian Film School, with the project "Being the Director - Maintaining your Vision While Swimming with Sharks", where he explored the nature of keeping a personal, artistic vision in a collective and commercial art form.

Diesen's second feature film, Hold My Heart, was Norway's official submission for the 2003 Academy Awards, and was screened at festivals globally. Diesen is also the creator of the Scandinavian thriller miniseries Torpedo. His first American film Red, starring Brian Cox and Tom Sizemore, premiered at the Sundance Film Festival in 2008.

Diesen is the director and pilot (conceptual) director on the Norwegian TV series Det tredje øyet/The Third Eye (2014). He directed two of the episodes of the ABC Networks US series The Assets (2014).

== Filmography ==
- Det tredje øyet/The Third Eye (2014) - director, pilot director
- The Assets (2014) - director
- Varg Veum - I mørket er alle ulver grå (2011) - writer
- Varg Veum - Svarte får (2010) - writer
- Winter - Venaste Land (2008) TV miniseries - director
- Red (2008) - director/producer
- Torpedo, (2007) TV miniseries - writer/director
- Drømmefangeren (2005) TV miniseries - director
- Tyven tyven (2002) or Hold My Heart - writer/director
- Mørkets øy (1997) or Island of Darkness - writer/director
