= Even Ormestad =

Norwegian bassist and producer (born 1978)

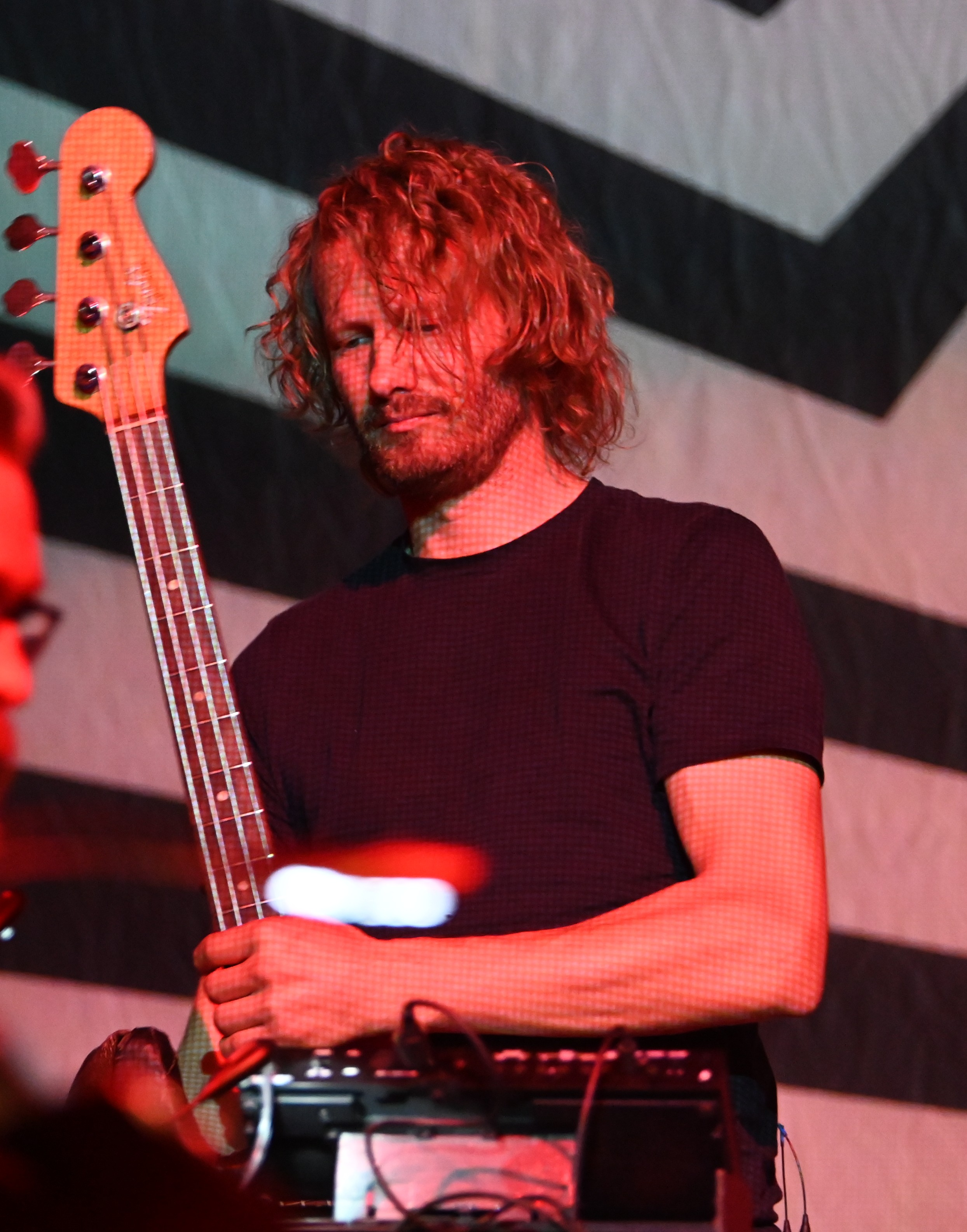
- Even Ormestad with Jaga Jazzist at Moldejazz in 2026

Background information
- Born: Even Enersen Ormestad; 9 November 1978 (age 47); Tønsberg, Norway
- Genres: Black metal, jazz, rock, electronica
- Occupations: Musician, music producer
- Instruments: Bass guitar, keyboards
- Labels: Ninja Tune, Napalm
- Website: www.allmusic.com/artist/even-ormestad-mn0000078871/credits

Even Enersen Ormestad (born 9 November 1978) is a Norwegian bass guitarist and music producer, known as a member of the band Jaga Jazzist.

== Career ==
Ormestad is educated in jazz and music production at Norges Musikkhøgskole and runs the studio Albatross Recorders together with Hasse Rosbach and Martin Sjølie.

He is together with the brothers Martin and Lars Horntveth part of the original lineup in Jaga Jazzist and has contributed with his bass and keyboards on recordings and tours with, among others Marit Larsen, Thom Hell, Bertine Zetlitz and Hanne Hukkelberg. In addition, he has worked as a producer and technician, often in collaboration with Audun Borrmann or Thomas Helland, for artists like Thom Hell, Hilde Marie Kjersem, Rockettothesky, Christer Knutsen, Bellman, Jonas Alaska, Marion Ravn, Matilda and a number of other artists. Ormestad also contributes as a bassist and multi instrumentalist on many of these releases.

Ormestad has also been seasonal member of the black metal band "Malignant Eternal" where he contributed to the studio album Alarm in 1999.

In 2015, Ormestad began touring as bassist for the Norwegian band a-ha on their "Cast in Steel" tour.

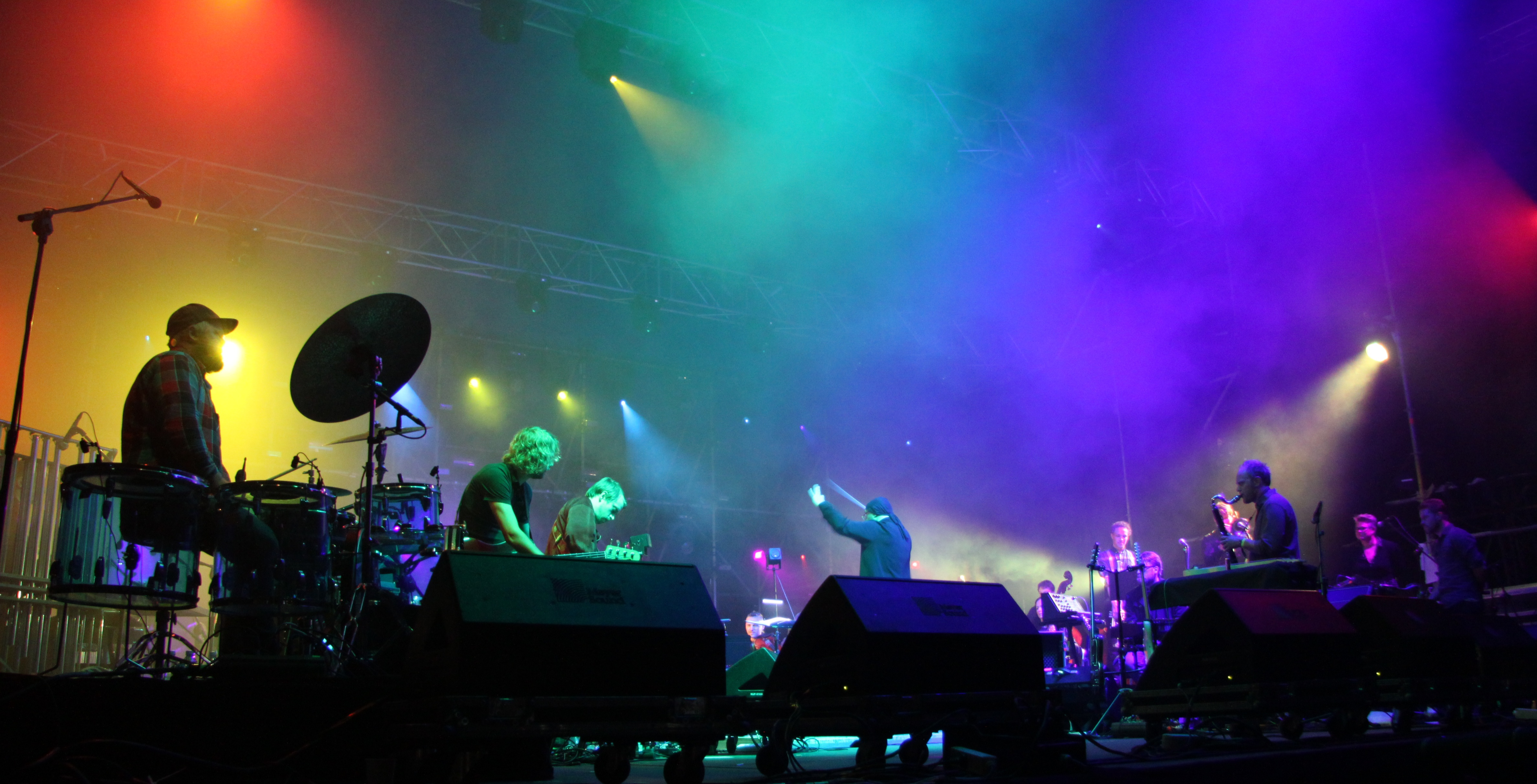
Jaga Jazzist at Tauron Nowa Muzyka in 2014.

== Discography ==
Albums

- Jævla Jazzist Grete Stitz (Thug Records, 1996)
- A Livingroom Hush (Smalltown Supersound, 2002)
- The Stix (WEA International Inc., 2003)
- What We Must (Ninja Tune, 2005)
- One-Armed Bandit (Ninja Tune, 2010)

EPs

- Magazine (dBut, 1998)
- Airborne/Going Down (WEA International Inc., 2001)
- Days (Smalltown Supersound, 2002)
- Animal Chin (Gold Standard Laboratories, 2003)
- Day (Ninja Tune, 2004)
- Bananfluer Overalt (Ninja Tune, 2010)

DVDs

- Live at Cosmopolite (Smalltown Supersound, 2009)

With Jonas Alaska

- Jonas Alaska (Jansen Plateproduksjon, 2011)
