= Christian Skolmen =

Norwegian actor

- Born: 28 October 1970
- Occupation: Film, stage, television and voice actor
- Spouse(s): Isabel Skolmen

Christian Skolmen (born 28 October 1970) is a Norwegian film, stage, television and voice actor who has been part of the Nationaltheatret since 1995, where he has appeared in The Pretenders (Ibsen), the Three Musketeers (Dumas) and Bakkantinnene (Euripides). He has also performed at the Torshovteatret in Ondskapen (Guillou), and the Trøndelag Teater in Peer Gynt (Ibsen).

On TV, Skolmen has appeared in Hunter (NRK), Hombres (TV-Norge) and in Sejer (NRK), based on the series of novels by Karin Fossum. He is the son of artist Jon Skolmen.

In summer 2008, Christian Skolmen appeared in Populærmusikk fra Vittula at the Christiania Theatre.

== Selected filmography ==
- 2003: Buddy
- 2004: Monstertorsdag
- 2006: Miracle
- 2008: Ulvenatten

== Dubbing roles ==
=== Animated films ===
- 2007 TMNT - Max Winters
