= Jørgen Langhelle =

Norwegian actor (1965–2021)

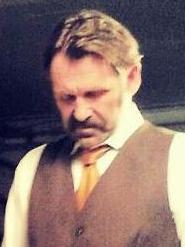
- Langhelle in 2012
- Born: 18 August 1965; Sandnes, Norway
- Died: 3 August 2021 (aged 55)
- Occupations: Stage actor, actor

Jørgen Langhelle (18 August 1965 – 3 August 2021) was a Norwegian actor of stage, screen and television.

== Biography ==
Langhelle starred in the two successful Norwegian mini-series Deadline Torp (2005) and Torpedo (2007), as well as in movies such as Kristin Lavransdatter (1995), Elling (2001), I Am Dina (2002), Tyven, tyven (2002), Ulvesommer (2003) and En folkefiende (a modernized version of Henrik Ibsen's play An Enemy of the People) (2005). In March 2010, Langhelle was cast in The Thing, the 2011 prequel to John Carpenter's 1982 horror classic of the same title.

== Partial filmography ==
- Kristin Lavransdatter (1995) - Simon Darre
- The Other Side of Sunday (1996) - Young Priest
- Hustruer III (1996) - Hugo
- Hamsun (1996) - Dommer Eide
- Salige er de som tørster (1997) - Olaf Frydenberg
- Only Clouds Move the Stars (1998) - Father
- Cellofan – med døden til følge (1998) - Jon 'Tiger' Eilertsen
- Elling (2001) - Frank Åsli
- Tyven, tyven (2002) - Harald Gran
- I Am Dina (2002) - Anders
- Pelle politibil (2002) - Langeleif
- Ulvesommer (2003) - Jon Reitan
- Tur & retur (2003) - Torkel
- Uno (2004) - Police officer
- Min misunnelige frisør (2004) - Finn
- Deadline Torp (2004, TV Movie) - Åge Lamberg
- En folkefiende (2005) - Tomas Stockman
- Harrys döttrar (2005) - Erik
- Arn: The Knight Templar (2007) - Erik Jedvardsson
- Kautokeino-opprøret (2008) - Halmboe
- The Man Who Loved Yngve (2008) - Terje Orheim - Jarles far
- Ulvenatten (2008) - Bjørnar Lehmann
- The Whore (2009) - Politiet
- Betrayal (2009) - Moland
- Yohan: The Child Wanderer (2010) - Nome
- The Thing (2011) - Lars
- Varg Veum - De døde har det godt (2012) - William Moberg
- Inside the Whore (2012) - Medietilsynet
- Pioneer (2013) - Leif
- The Veil of Twilight (2014) - Sysselmannen
- Dirk Ohm - Illusjonisten som forsvant (2015) - Marias far
- Armoton maa (2017) - Gunnar
- Kings Bay (2017) - Knut
- Oskars Amerika (2017) - Levi
- Valley of Shadows (2017) - Policeman
- Juleblod (2017) - Nissen
- Kometen (2017) - Bill
- The Birdcatcher (2019) - Henry Gleditsch
- Fågelfångarens Son (2019) - Såmal
