= Kristin Lavransdatter (film) =

- Directed by: Liv Ullmann
- Written by: Liv Ullmann
- Based on: Kristin Lavransdatter by Sigrid Undset
- Produced by: Esben Høilund Carlsen
- Starring: Elisabeth Matheson; Jørgen Langhelle; Bjørn Skagestad; Lena Endre; Sverre Anker Ousdal; Erland Josephson
- Cinematography: Sven Nykvist
- Edited by: Michal Leszczylowski
- Music by: Ketil Hvoslef
- Release date: August 25, 1995
- Running time: 180 minutes
- Country: Norway
- Language: Norwegian
- Box office: $3.7 million (Norway)

Kristin Lavransdatter is a 1995 Norwegian film directed by Liv Ullmann, featuring Elisabeth Matheson, Bjørn Skagestad, Jørgen Langhelle, Lena Endre and Sverre Anker Ousdal, based on Sigrid Undset's trilogy of historical novels Kristin Lavransdatter. The film was selected, as the Norwegian entry for the Best Foreign Language Film at the 68th Academy Awards, but was not accepted as a nominee. It was the highest-grossing Norwegian film of all time with a gross of $3.7 million.

== Plot ==
Set in medieval Norway, the story follows young Kristin, whose life is overshadowed by a series of misfortunes: her sister is crippled in an accident, and Kristin herself survives an attempted rape. Seeking solace, she convinces her father, Lavrans, and her fiancé, Simon, to let her enter a cloister for one year.

Kristin's religious devotion is tested when she meets the knight Erlend Nikolaussøn, a man with a reputation as a seducer. Defying the strict social customs of the time, the two fall in love and swear eternal loyalty to each other.

== See also ==
- List of historical drama films
- List of submissions to the 68th Academy Awards for Best Foreign Language Film
- List of Norwegian submissions for the Academy Award for Best Foreign Language Film
