= Gunhild Dahlberg =

Norwegian television presenter and actress

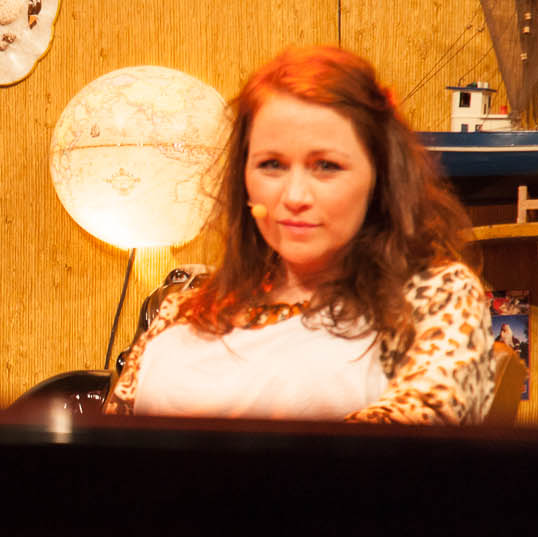
Gunhild Dahlberg, 2013

Gunhild Dahlberg (born 6 April 1975) is a Norwegian television presenter, journalist, and author.

== Tv appearances ==
- XLTV (1998–99)
- Go' Elg (1999–2000)
- Åpen Post (2002)
- Et Dukkehjem (2004)
- Norge Rundt (2005)
- 9 av 10 Nordmenn (2006)
- Barnas Superjul (2007)
- Der Ingen Skulle Tru at Nokon Hunne Bu (2007)
- Celebert Selskap (2010)
- Koselig Med Peis (2011)
- 4-Stjerners Middag (2011)
- Tørnquist Show (2012–2013)
- Sommertid (2014)
- Underholdningsåret 2014
- Gunhild Hjelper Deg (2014)
- Fjellflørt (2015)
- Nabolaget (2015)
- Bolig Til Salgs (2016)

== Bibliography ==
- Dahlberg, Gunhild. (2008) Norge i dag: En fullstendig subjektiv reiseskildring fra en syklende reporter på svært lavt blodsukker fra Nordkapp til Lindesnes. Kagge forlag. ISBN 978-82-489-0795-4
- Dahlberg, Gunhild & Espeland, Webjørn S. (2011) Sånn ca. alt om sex og kjærlighet. Aschehoug. ISBN 978-82-032-5387-4
