= Come On Over to the Other Side =

Studio album by The National Bank
- Released: 2008
- Genre: Pop

The National Bank chronology
| The National Bank (2004) | Come On Over to the Other Side (2008) |

Come On Over to the Other Side is the second studio album released by the Norwegian band The National Bank.

== Track listing ==
1. Home
2. Cubicle Man
3. Family
4. Let Go
5. Taste of Me
6. From That Day to This
7. The Balladeer
8. Something New
9. Styrofoam
10. Some Paper on the Bedroom Floor
11. Make It Burn
