= Hold My Heart (film) =

2002 Norwegian drama film

- Directed by: Trygve Allister Diesen
- Written by: Trygve Allister Diesen
- Starring: Jørgen Langhelle
- Release date: 22 March 2002
- Running time: 92 minutes
- Country: Norway
- Language: Norwegian

Hold My Heart (Norwegian: Tyven, tyven) is a 2002 Norwegian drama film directed by Trygve Allister Diesen. It was selected as the Norwegian entry for the Best Foreign Language Film at the 75th Academy Awards, but it was not nominated.

== Cast ==
- Jørgen Langhelle as Harald Gran
- Vera Rudi as Lise Lunde
- Andrea Bræin Hovig as Cecilie Lunde
- Kari Simonsen as Gerd Lunde
- Ingjerd Egeberg as Toril Houg

== See also ==
- List of submissions to the 75th Academy Awards for Best Foreign Language Film
- List of Norwegian submissions for the Academy Award for Best Foreign Language Film
