= The Whore (2009 film) =

- Film poster
- Norwegian: Hora
- Directed by: Reinert Kiil
- Written by: Reinert Kiil
- Produced by: Reinert Kiil
- Starring: Jørgen Langhelle; Kenneth Falkenberg
- Cinematography: Vidar Olsen; Patrik Säfström
- Edited by: Reinert Kiil
- Music by: Vegard Blomberg
- Production company: Kiil Produksjon
- Distributed by: Another World Entertainment
- Release dates: 9 September 2009 (BUT Film Festival); 2 February 2010 (Norway)
- Running time: 89 minutes
- Country: Norway
- Language: Norwegian
- Budget: 240 000 Kr.

The Whore (Norwegian: Hora) is a Norwegian comedy-horror film directed by Reinert Kiil and starring Jørgen Langhelle.

== Plot ==
Rikke is an author and is writing on a new novel. To find inspiration she decides to get out to the countryside town where her mother is buried. This local community called Dokka is full of goons who make it difficult for Rikkie to write her book.

== Cast ==
- Ailen as Hora
- Rudy Claes as Politikvinne
- Jørgen Langhelle as Politiet
- Reinert Kiil as Regissøren
- Minken Tveitan as Hilde
- Kenneth Falkenberg as John
- Eik Ommedal as Rikkard
- Gaute Næsheim as Ronny
- Cassandra Jacobsen as Jenny
- Isabel Vibe as Rikke
- Iselin Saga as Dame
- Beate Kletten as Mora
- Hugo Mikal Skår as Voldtektsmann
- Ailen Wahlmann as Girl

== Production ==
Kiil shot the project with a budget of 240,000 Kroner in just 10 days with a shooting schedule of 16 hours per day at a cabin in Oslo. It is Norway's first exploitation film. Kiil cast Scandinavian porn star Isabel Vibe for the lead character Rikke.

== Release ==
The film premiered on September 9, 2009, in Oslo and was on February 5, 2010, released on DVD in Norway. The Whore was banned in Minneapolis at the Minneapolis underground film festival; a private screening was later organised.

== Awards ==
The film won Best Feature Award in the Netherlands at BUT FILM FESTIVAL 2009 and the award was presented to Reinert Kiil by director John Waters. The Whore won best sound mix at Denver Underground Film Festival in 2009.

== Soundtrack ==
The score was composed by Apoptygma Berzerk sound engineer Vegard Blomberg.

== Sequel ==
The Sequel Inside the Whore was released 2011 in Norway. It was filmed in summer 2010 in Kvamm, Norway. The sequel's director was Reinert Kiil, who also portrayed the lead character. Other cast members were Jørgen Langhelle, Viktoria Winge, Kim Sønderholm, porn star Isabel Vibe and Reality TV (Big Brother) star Anette Young.
