= Rottenetter =

2009 film

- Directed by: Arild Østin Ommundsen
- Written by: Arild Østin Ommundsen; Arild Rein
- Produced by: Finn Gjerdrum; Stein B. Kvae
- Starring: Christian Rubeck; Kristoffer Joner; Silje Salomonsen; Fridtjov Såheim
- Cinematography: Trond Tønder
- Edited by: Erik Andersson
- Music by: Thomas Dybdahl
- Release date: April 9, 2009
- Running time: 97 minutes
- Country: Norway
- Language: Norwegian

Rottenetter (Rat Nights) is a Norwegian film from 2009. It was directed by Arild Østin Ommundsen, and it is his third feature film. Østin Ommundsen write the screenplay together with Arild Rein.

The film closed the Norwegian International Film Festival in Haugesund in 2009.

== Plot ==
Stavanger is no longer a small fishing town on the west coast. Now the city is considered the Norwegian "oil capital" and "culture capital," and the inhabitants have become richer, their cars bigger and more expensive, and their houses far more luxurious. Old wooden houses are being demolished to make way for larger housing complexes and giant food festivals. However, behind it all looms the 2008 financial crisis.

In the middle of this materialistic story stands Jonny Kristiansen (played by Christian Rubeck), an up-and-coming 25-year-old broker. Hungry for money and success, he is soon drawn into an unscrupulous financial world with big cigars, champagne and exclusive call girls. Jonny is aiming for the top of the financial pyramid, and his main goal is to become the very best, richest, and most powerful—whatever the cost.
