= Eventyrland =

2013 Norwegian film directed by Arild Østin Ommundsen

- Directed by: Arild Østin Ommundsen
- Written by: Arild Østin Ommundsen
- Produced by: Arild Østin Ommundsen; Gary Cranner
- Starring: Silje Salomonsen
- Cinematography: Arild Østin Ommundsen
- Edited by: Arild Østin Ommundsen
- Music by: Thomas Dybdahl
- Release date: March 22, 2013
- Running time: 91 minutes
- Country: Norway
- Language: Norwegian

Eventyrland (English: It's Only Make Believe) is a Norwegian film from 2013. The film was directed by Arild Østin Ommundsen, who was also responsible for the script, cinematography, and editing. Filming lasted over 18 months, which is an unusually long time. The film's music was composed by Thomas Dybdahl. The film's main character, Jenny, is portrayed by Silje Salomonsen in her first lead role in a Norwegian film. The film alternates between being an intense thriller and a love story.

The film won the prize for best cinematography in the 2013 Amanda Awards and the prizes for best director and best producer at the 2013 Kanon Awards, all honoring Arild Østin Ommundsen.

== Plot ==
Jenny is a woman who has just gotten out after serving a sentence in prison. Her dream is to build a home for herself and her daughter. It becomes difficult when the past threatens to catch up with her. The difficult choices that will decide absolutely everything force themselves on her and require drastic action from Jenny. This is a story about a murder that should never have happened, about friends one should never trust, and about a debt that only increases with each installment. It is an existence in which Jenny has lost everything, but she still has everything to gain: her daughter.

== Cast ==
- Silje Salomonsen as Jenny
- Tomas Alf Larsen as Gary
- Egil Birkeland as Eddie Vedder
- Vegar Hoel as Ådne
- Fredrik S. Hana as Frank
- Ole Romsdal as Tønder
- Iben Østin Hjelle as Merete
- Kjell Breivik as Frank's father
- Tore Reidarsønn Kvam as the social worker
- Lene Heimlund Larsen as Claire
- Kjersti Østin Ommundsen as Gunn Oddny
- Thomas Skjørestad as Timmy Virkola
- Terje Torkildsen as the plumber

== Awards and nominations ==
- 2013 Amanda Award:
  - Best cinematography: Arild Østin Ommundsen
  - Nominated for best Norwegian feature film
  - Nominated for best music: Thomas Dybdahl
  - Nominated for best editing: Arild Østin Ommundsen
  - Nominated for best sound design: Gisle Tveito and Arild Østin Ommundsen
- 2013 Kanon Award:
  - Best director: Arild Østin Ommundsen
  - Best producer: Arild Østin Ommundsen and Gary Cranner
  - Nominated for best female lead role: Silje Salomonsen
  - Nominated for best screenplay: Arild Østin Ommundsen
  - Nominated for best cinematography: Arild Østin Ommundsen
