= Science (album) =

Studio album by Thomas Dybdahl
- Released: 2006
- Recorded: 2006
- Genre: Pop/Rock
- Length: 40:34
- Label: CCAP/EMI

Thomas Dybdahl chronology
One day you'll dance for me, New York City (2004)	Science (2006)	Waiting for That One Clear Moment (2010)

Professional ratings
Review scores
Source	Rating
Allmusic	3.5/5 stars

Science is the fourth album released by the Norwegian singer/songwriter Thomas Dybdahl.

== Track listing ==
1. "Something Real" – 4:00
2. "How It Feels" – 3:06
3. "Still My Body Aches" – 3:40
4. "No One Would Ever Know" – 3:30
5. "Dice" – 1:54
6. "Always" – 4:28
7. "U" – 4:14
8. "This Year" – 4:19
9. "Maury The Pawn" – 3:56
10. "Outro" – 4:02
11. "B A Part" – 3:25

=== Bonus tracks ===
- "Everybody Knows" – 2:59 (iTunes bonus track)
