= Ulvenatten =

2008 Norwegian action film

- Directed by: Kjell Sundvall
- Written by: Tom Egeland
- Based on: Tom Egeland's 2005 novel Ulvenatten
- Produced by: Aage Aaberge; Kåre Storemyr
- Starring: Anneke von der Lippe
- Cinematography: Harald Paalgard
- Edited by: Thomas Täng
- Distributed by: Nordisk Film
- Release date: February 29, 2008
- Running time: 90 minutes
- Country: Norway
- Language: Norwegian

Ulvenatten (Night of the Wolf) is a Norwegian action and drama film from 2008 directed by Kjell Sundvall. It is based on Tom Egeland's 2005 novel of the same name. The film premiered in Norway on February 29, 2008. The film was seen by 61,672 viewers at Norwegian cinemas.

== Plot ==
The film is portrays a live debate program on television, when terrorists from Chechnya take host Kristin Bye and the debaters hostage.

== Cast ==
- Anneke von der Lippe as Kristin Bye, the program host
- Dejan Čukić as Ramzan, a terrorist
- Christian Skolmen as Thomas Fjell, the hostage negotiator
- Ingar Helge Gimle as Aksel Schjeldrup, the operational manager
- Jørgen Langhelle as Bjørn Lehman, a police anti-terror unit leader
- Stig Henrik Hoff as Vidar Bø, a Delta police member
- Sigrid Huun as Silje Gran
- Ramadan Huseini as Ulven (the Wolf), a terrorist
- Lars Arentz-Hansen as Leder, a Delta quartermaster
- Ramil Aliyev as a Chechen student
