= Jaga Jazzist =

Norwegian jazz band

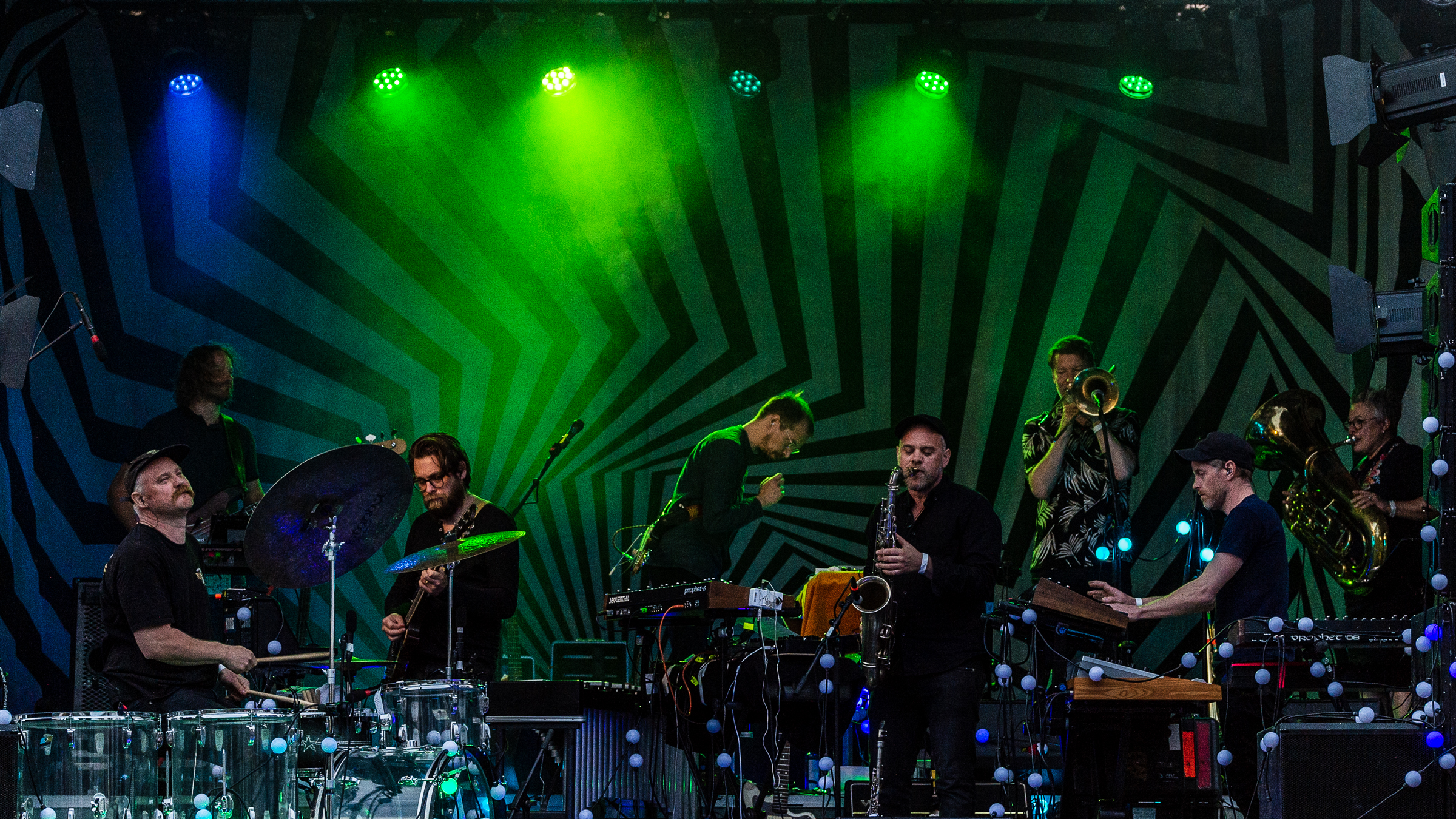
- Jaga Jazzist at Terrassejazz 2021 in Evje, Norway

Background information
- Origin: Tønsberg, Norway
- Genres: Jazztronica; acid jazz; jazz fusion; avant-garde jazz; experimental rock; post-rock
- Years active: 1994–present
- Labels: Smalltown Supersound, Ninja Tune
- Members: Martin Horntveth; Lars Horntveth; Marcus Forsgren; Even Ormestad; Andreas Mjøs; Line Horntveth; Øystein Moen; Erik Johannessen
- Past members: Mathias Eick; Harald Frøland; Ivar Chr. Johansen / Ravi; Jonas Bendiksen; Lars Wabø; Mads Jansen; Marius Hesby; Thomas Viken; Lars Erik Myran; Jørgen Munkeby; Håvard Myklebust; Torgeir Audunson; Bjørn Strand; Sjur Miljeteig; Morten Qvenild; Ketil Einarsen; Andreas Hessen Schei; Nils Martin Larsen; Anders Hana; Stian Westerhus
- Website: jagajazzist.com

Jaga Jazzist (also known as Jaga) is a Norwegian jazz fusion band. Their second album, A Livingroom Hush (Smalltown Supersound/Ninja Tune), was named the best jazz album of 2002 by the BBC.

== Biography ==
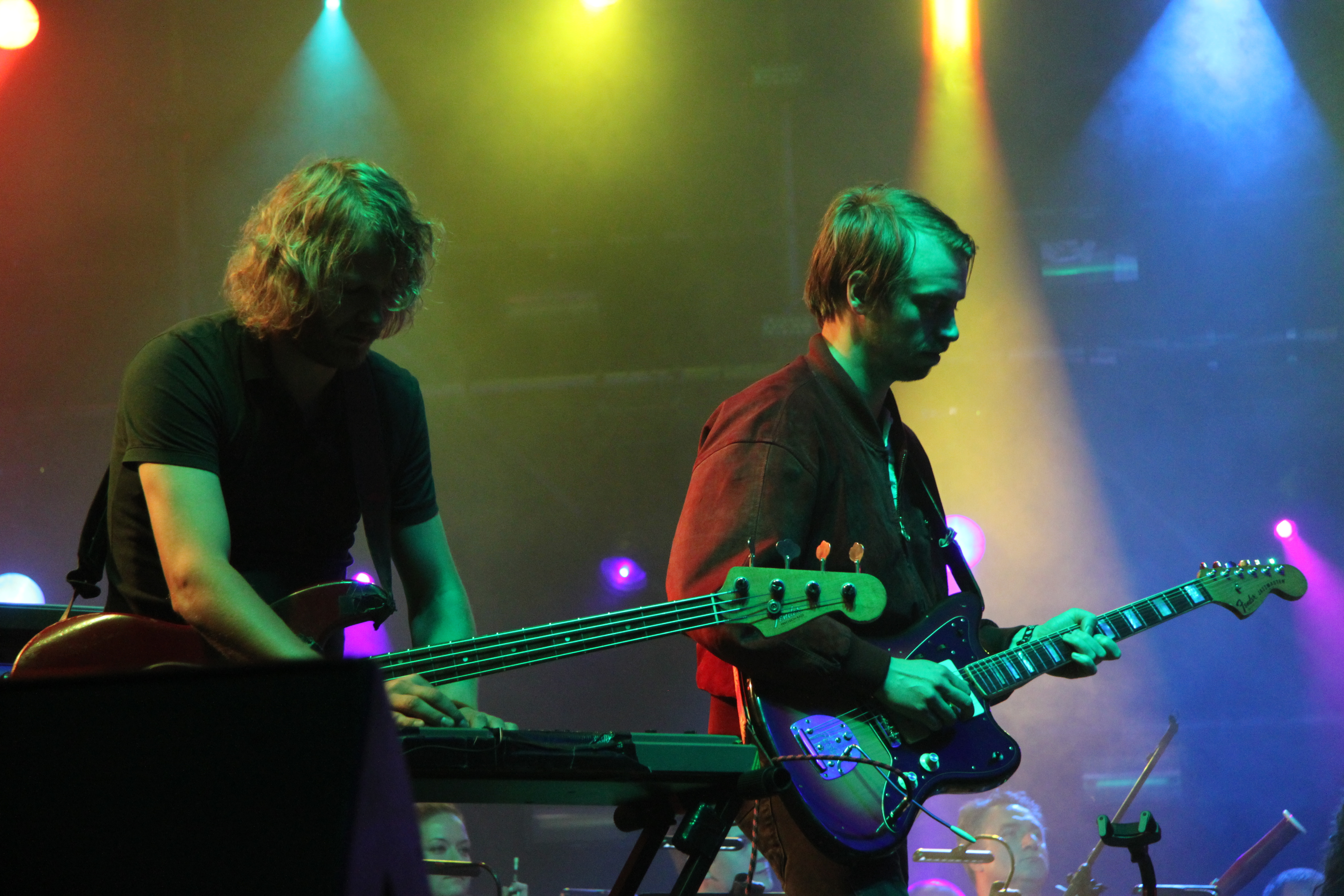
Jaga Jazzist at Tauron Nowa Muzyka 2014.

The core of the band are the brothers and the main songwriters, Lars and Martin Horntveth. Martin formed Jaga Jazzist together with Ivar Christian Johansen in 1994 while they still were in their teens, though Johansen later left the group. The brothers are also prominent figures of the Norwegian pop act The National Bank.

Jaga Jazzist nearly created a sensation with their debut album, Jævla Jazzist Grete Stitz (1996), that contained playful, humorous jazz with elements of rap. The EP Magazine (1998) showed signs of the catchy, cinematic approach to jazz music they later became known for. The very young Lars Horntveth became increasingly involved in composing the music they played.

After Magazine word spread about their fresh musical expressions and energetic live shows, and the band toured extensively before they signed a recording contract with Warner Music of Norway in 2000. The highly anticipated debut album for Warner, A Livingroom Hush, was released in 2001 and consists of a melodic and energetic mix of lounge jazz, cinematic themes and instrumental rock. The producer Jørgen "Sir Duper Man" Træen played an important role during the recording, and left his mark on the disc with his crackling electronics. A Livingroom Hush won the Norwegian music award Alarm Prize in 2002 and the same year was named Jazz Album of the Year by BBC listeners.

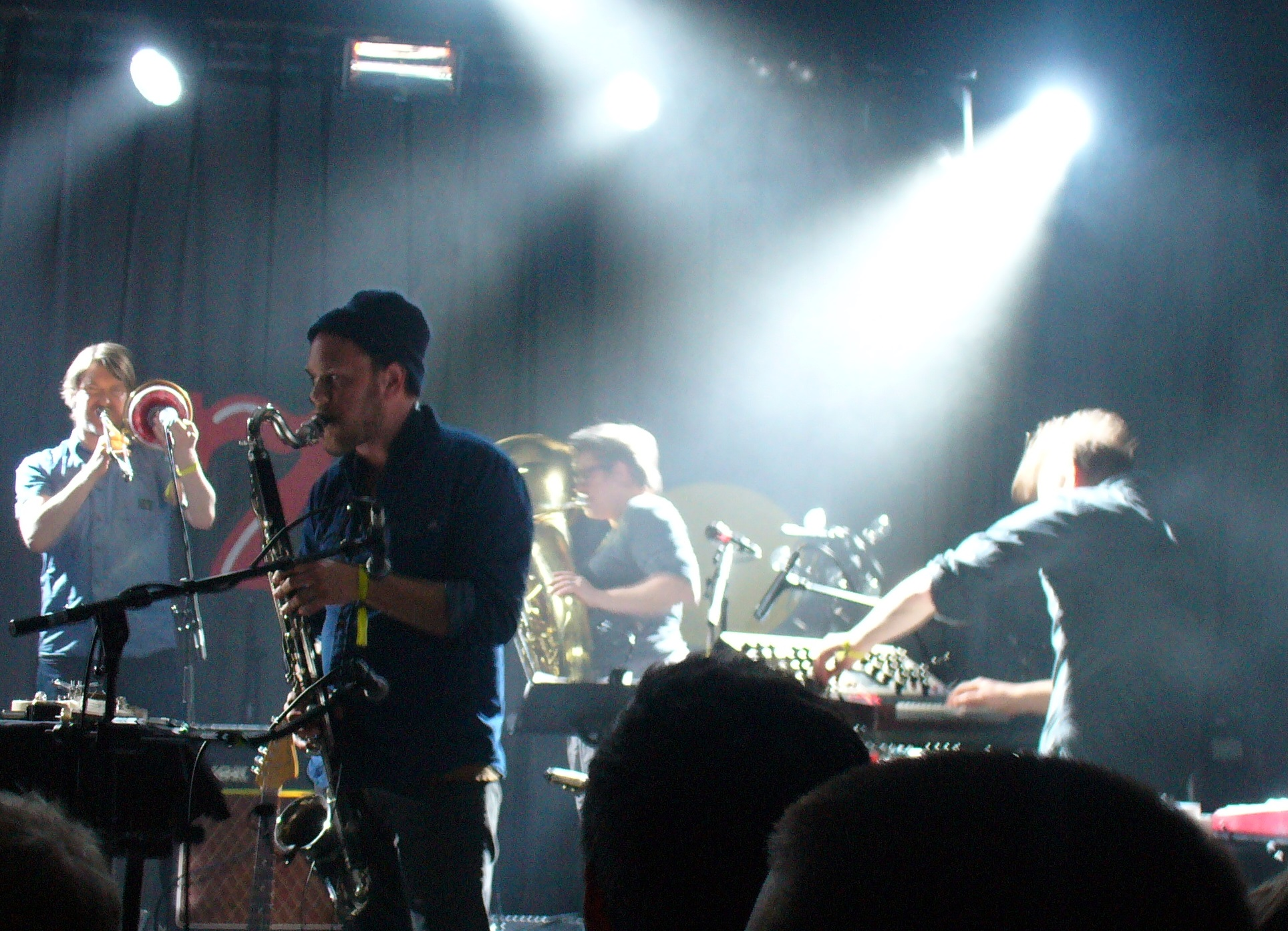
Jaga Jazzist at Vossajazz 2014.

The band features trumpets, trombone, electric guitar, bass, drums, tuba, bass clarinets, Fender Rhodes, vibraphone and a rack of electronics, as well as strong melodies and rhythms. Talk Talk, Soft Machine, John Coltrane, Don Cherry, Aphex Twin, Stereolab, Squarepusher and Tortoise are frequently mentioned as sources of inspiration. Jaga Jazzist is widely considered to be one of the premier acts of the so-called nu-jazz movement of Scandinavia. The Mars Volta cite Jaga Jazzist as one of their favourite bands. Jaga Jazzist's studio album One-Armed Bandit was released on January 25, 2010, on Ninja Tune.

In May 2013, Jaga Jazzist collaborated with the Britten Sinfonia to release Live with Britten Sinfonia on Ninja Tune, to a positive critical reception. All About Jazz's John Kelman wrote of the album: "That Live with Britten Sinfonia was an album not necessarily intended to happen at the time of the recording only makes its release all the sweeter. This 35-piece marriage of Jaga Jazzist and Britten Sinfonia is capable of everything from earth-shattering power to refined beauty. With Britten conducted by Christian Eggen, Live with Britten Sinfonia is the vital document of an opportunity that no longer need feel missed by so many Jaga fans around the world—an album that, transcending their already significant accomplishments, demonstrates even greater potential for Lars Horntveth's writing and Jaga Jazzist's effortless (and faultless) performances."

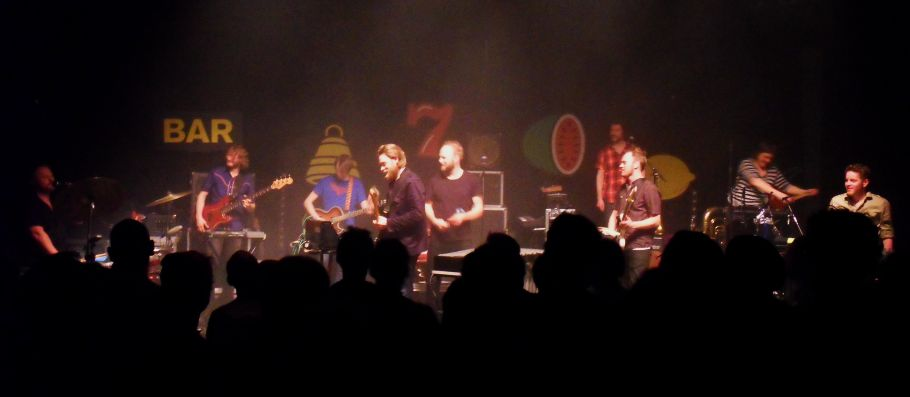
Jaga Jazzist live in Hamburg 2011.

Jaga Jazzist released their album Starfire in 2015 on Ninja Tune.

== Members ==
=== Current members ===
- Lars Horntveth – tenor sax, baritone sax, soprano sax, clarinet, bass clarinet, flute, guitar, piano, keyboards, programming, lap steel guitar (1994–present)
- Line Horntveth – tuba, flute, percussion, vocals (1994–present)
- Martin Horntveth – percussion, drums, programming (1994–present)
- Andreas Mjøs – guitar, percussion, glockenspiel, marimba, vibraphone (1994–present)
- Even Ormestad – bass, percussion, glockenspiel, keyboards (1995–present)
- Erik Johannessen – trombone, marxophone, percussion (2005–present)
- Øystein Moen – keyboards, percussion (2008–present)
- Marcus Forsgren – guitar, effects (2009–present)

=== Past members ===
- Harald Frøland – guitar (1994–2005, 2006–2007)
- Ivar Christian Johansen – trumpet, vocals (1994–2001)
- Jonas Bendiksen – keyboards (1994–1997)
- Lars Wabø – trombone (1994–2005)
- Mads Jansen – trombone (1994)
- Marius Hesby – trombone (1994)
- Tomas Viken – tenor saxophone (1994)
- Lars Erik Myran – bass (1994)
- Jørgen Munkeby – alto saxophone, tenor saxophone, flute, alto flute, bass clarinet, keyboards (1995–2002)
- Håvard Myklebust – trombone (1996)
- Torgeir Audunson – trumpet (1996–1997)
- Bjørn Strand – tenor saxophone (1997)
- Sjur Miljeteig – trumpet (1997)
- Mathias Eick – trumpet, French horn, keyboards, upright bass (1998–2014)
- Morten Qvenild – keyboards (2001)
- Ketil Einarsen – flute, keys, percussion (2002–2005, 2006–2007)
- Andreas Hessen Schei – keyboards (2002–2005, 2006–2007)
- Nils Martin Larsen – keyboards (2005)
- Anders Hana – guitar, effects (2005)
- Stian Westerhus – guitar, effects (2008–2009)

== Discography ==
=== Studio albums ===
- 1996: Jævla Jazzist Grete Stitz (Thug Records)
- 2002: A Livingroom Hush (Smalltown Supersound)
- 2003: The Stix (WEA International Inc.)
- 2005: What We Must (Ninja Tune)
- 2010: One-Armed Bandit (Ninja Tune)
- 2015: Starfire (Ninja Tune)
- 2020: Pyramid (Brainfeeder)

=== EPs ===
- 1998: Magazine (dBut)
- 2001: Airborne/Going Down (WEA International Inc.)
- 2002: Days (Smalltown Supersound)
- 2003: Animal Chin (Gold Standard Laboratories)
- 2004: Day (Ninja Tune)
- 2010: Bananfluer Overalt (Ninja Tune)

=== Live ===
- 2013: Live with Britten Sinfonia (Ninja Tune)
- 2021: The Tower (Brainfeeder)

=== DVDs ===
- 2009: Live at Cosmopolite (Smalltown Supersound)

=== Collaborations ===
- 2003: In the Fishtank 10 (Konkurrent) – Jaga Jazzist Horns (L. Horntveth, Eick and Munkeby) in collaboration with Motorpsycho

=== Contributions ===
- 2003: Sivil Ulyd 2: Sivilarbeiderplata (Passive Fist Productions), compilation various artists

Awards
Preceded by Kristin Asbjørnsen	Recipient of the Open class Spellemannprisen; 2010	Succeeded by Bárut – Inga Juuso
Preceded by Dag Arnesen	Recipient of the Jazz class Gammleng-prisen; 2015	Succeeded by -
