= Live with Britten Sinfonia =

Live album by Jaga Jazzist
- Released: 13 May 2013
- Recorded: June and September 2012
- Genre: Jazz, classical
- Length: 67:42
- Label: Ninja Tune

Jaga Jazzist chronology
| One-Armed Bandit (2009) | Live with Britten Sinfonia (2013) | Starfire (2015) |

Professional ratings
Aggregate scores
| Source | Rating |
|---|---|
| Metacritic | 67/100 |
Review scores
| Source | Rating |
| Allmusic | 3.5/5 stars |
| PopMatters | 5/10 |

Live with Britten Sinfonia is a live album by Norwegian band Jaga Jazzist and English orchestra Britten Sinfonia. It was recorded in 2012 and released in May 2013 under Ninja Tune.

== Track list ==
| No. | Title | Length |
|---|---|---|
| 1. | "One-Armed Bandit" | 15:24 |
| 2. | "Kitty Wu" | 6:24 |
| 3. | "Prungen" | 7:16 |
| 4. | "Bananfluer Overalt" | 10:57 |
| 5. | "For All You Happy People" | 6:33 |
| 6. | "Toccata" | 8:31 |
| 7. | "Music! Dance! Drama!" | 6:25 |
| 8. | "Oslo Skyline" | 6:12 |
