= Andreas Mjøs =

Norwegian musician (born 1976)

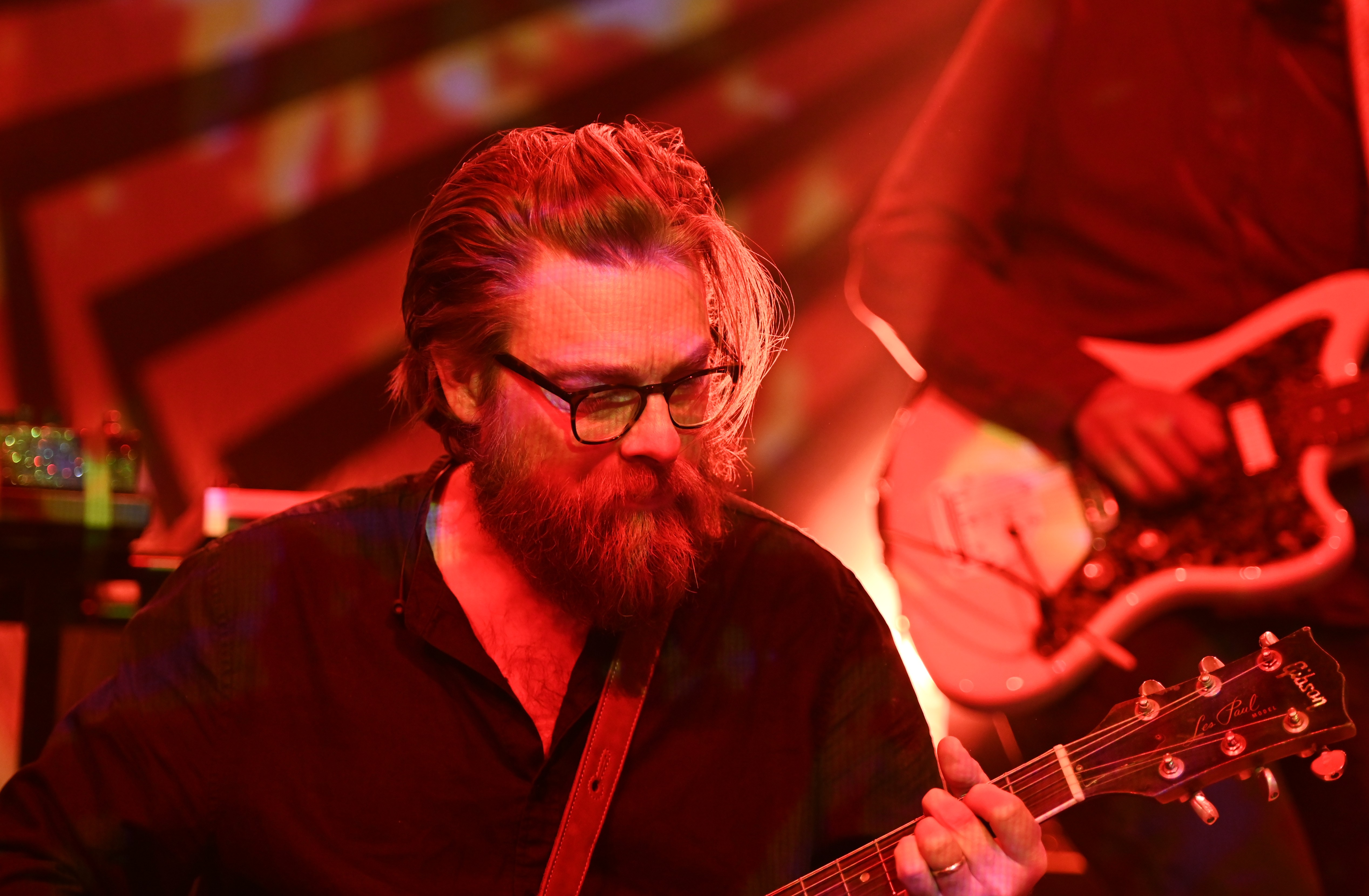
- Mjøs at Moldejazz 2026

Background information
- Born: 1 March 1976 (age 50); Tønsberg, Norway
- Genres: Jazz, rock, electronica
- Occupations: Musician, music producer
- Instruments: Vibraphone, percussions, guitar
- Labels: Smalltown Supersound; Warner; Jester

Andreas Mjøs (born 1 March 1976 in Tønsberg, Norway) is a Norwegian musician, record producer and composer, known from a series of performances and albums within Jaga Jazzist. He is also on a number of other album releases both as performer and producer.

== Discography (in selection) ==
=== Solo albums ===
Within «Rotoscope» including Jørgen Træen, Knut Aalefjær, Rune Brøndbo, Lars Horntveth, Rob Waring & Christine Sandtorv

- 2001: Great Curves (Jester), feat. Hild Sofie Tafjord & Marius Reksjø (also as composer & producer)

=== Collaborations ===
With Gebhardt & Mjøs

- 2005: Alt for Norge (Apache)

Within Jaga Jazzist

- 1996: Jævla Jazzist Grete Stitz (Thug)
- 1998: Magazine EP (Dbut)
- 2001: A Livingroom Hush (Warner Music Norway)
- 2001: Airborne/Going Down EP (Warner Music Norway)
- 2001: Going Down 12" (Smalltown Supersound)
- 2002: The Stix (Smalltown Supersound / Warner Music Norway)
- 2002: Days 12", (Smalltown Supersound)
- 2003: Animal Chin EP 12" (Golden Standard Labs)
- 2005: What We Must (Ninja Tune / Smalltown Supersound / Sonet)
- 2010: One-Armed Bandit (Sonet)

Within «In The Country»

- 2009: White Out (Rune Grammofon)
- 2011: Sounds And Sights (Rune Grammofon)

With other projects

- 2000: Clouds Rolling By (Warner Music Norway), with Bigbang
- 2001: Alfabet (Warner Music Norway), with Anne Grete Preus
- 2004: Miracle Working Man (Stickman & Sticksisters), with «HGH»
- 2004: List of Lights and Buoys (Rune Grammofon), with Susanna & the Magical Orchestra
- 2005: Adjágas (Trust Me), with Adjagas
- 2010: Synlige Hjerteslag (Grappa), with Frida Ånnevik
- 2010: World of the Free (Universal / Trust Me), with Haddy N'jie

As producer

- 2000 - Stella Polaris, Tristan & Isolde (Stella Polaris)
- 2004 - Susanna and the Magical Orchestra, List of Lights and Buoys (Rune Grammofon)
- 2005 - Adjagas, Adjagas (Trust Me )
- 2007 - Saralunden/Bjørkaas/Mjøs, Dubious (Nexsound)
- 2007 - Levi Henriksen & Thomas Mårud, Bang bang rett ned (Norskamerikaner)
- 2007 - «Slagr», Solaris (NorCD)
- 2007 - «Dinosau», A Little Crime (Propeller)
- 2009 - Adjagas: Manu Rávdnji (Trust Me)
- 2009 - «In The Country»: White Out (Rune Grammofon)
- 2009 - «One People»: Teranga Vol 2 (MTG)
- 2010 - Frida Ånnevik: Synlige Hjerteslag (Grappa )
- 2010 - Haddy N'jie: World of the Free (Universal/Trust Me)
- 2011 - «Kaia»: La La La (Northern Sound)
- 2011 - Pristine: Detoxing (no) (BluesNews)
- 2012 - Heidi Solheim: Found (Finito Bacalao/Phonofile)
