= Et Dukkehjem =

Sketch show on Norwegian TV

Et Dukkehjem was a sketch show shown on Norwegian NRK television channel NRK1, presented by Mari Grydeland and Gunhild Dahlberg. There were six episodes to the series and ran on Thursdays at 22:30 from 2 September 2004 until 14 October 2004 (missing one week).

Most probably named after the famous play by Norwegian Henrik Ibsen, the sketches each seem to come from a different room of a house. There were weekly sketches, such as one where they would give five alternative uses for common products, such as using slices of beef to make hats/gloves/tube tops etc., and one-off sketches like 'Sex og Oslo City'. Also throughout the series they launched a hate campaign against kabaret which is a dish in which ingredients are set into a gelatine, it can be either fish in aspic (fiskekabaret), meat in aspic, or, (as used in the show) vegetables in aspic (grønnsakkabaret).
