= Ravi (Ivar Johansen) =

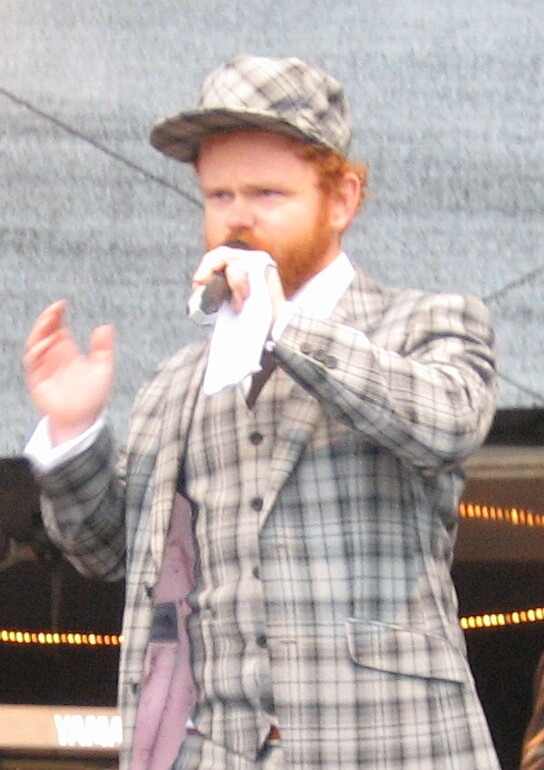
- Ravi on stage in 2008.

Background information
- Born: Ivar Christian Johansen; 28 April 1976 (age 50); Tønsberg, Norway
- Genres: Vocals, keyboards, trumpet
- Years active: 1994–present

Ivar Christian Johansen (born 28 April 1976 in Tønsberg, Norway) is a Norwegian popular artist, musician (vocals, keyboards and trumpet), composer, journalist and program manager (NRK and TV2 Norway), known under the pseudonym Ravi (his first name backwards).

== Career ==
Ravi writes songs with Anders Løvlie under the name Ravi og DJ Løv. He played in the bands like Briskeby, Folk & Røvere, Jessica Fletchers and was a founding member of Jaga Jazzist (1994-2001).

Ravi covered the song "Cheerio", originally sung by The Monroes, and renamed it Tsjeriåu/Tsjeriå. In the music video, he appears as a baby and DJ Løv is dressed as a Marine.

Ravi has also appeared in "Venn" ("Friend") by Espen Lind and Lene Marlin, which was made to raise money for tsunami victims.

Ravi has released many albums, in his own "Ravi language", he writes things phonetically, e.g. "cheerio" = "tsjeriåu", "kroppen min" (my body) = kråpn min, and "it's too late to cry" = "its tu leit tu krai".

Some of his other known songs are "Utadæsjælåplevelse", "E-Ore", "Ås To I Osjlo" and "Dødsøt".

In 2007, 2008 and 2009 he was the host of the show "Landeplage" on NRK.

== Discography ==
=== Solo albums ===
- Kjøpr Gitar (Sony BMG, 2006)

=== As sideman ===
- Jeans for Onassis (2000) with Briskeby
- Bagateller (Voices Music & Entertainment, 2002) with Folk & Røvere
- Lekr Butik (Nok Records, 2004), Ravi & DJ Løv
- Den Nye Arbæidsdagn (Sony BMG, 2005), Ravi & DJ Løv
