= Mongoland =

2001 film by Arild Østin Ommundsen

- Norwegian DVD cover
- Directed by: Arild Østin Ommundsen
- Written by: Gro Elin Hjelle; Eigil Kvie Jansen; Arild Østin Ommundsen
- Produced by: Ingrid Festøy Ottesen
- Starring: Pia Tjelta; Kristoffer Joner; Vegar Hoel
- Edited by: Erik Andersson
- Music by: Cloroform
- Distributed by: Europafilm AS
- Release date: 26 January 2001
- Running time: 84 minutes
- Country: Norway
- Language: Norwegian

Mongoland is a Norwegian film, from 2001, by Arild Østin Ommundsen.

Having lived in England for six months Pia returns home for Christmas. She is looking for Kristoffer, her boyfriend, who was supposed to go with her abroad. It turns out rather difficult to locate him as she contacts their mutual friends.

Her search for Kristoffer results in meeting several disillusioned people. Her old friend Vegar imagines a physical defect, the rapper Gary can find no inspiration because of a lack of social problems, Wayne fled England as a result of trouble with love. Stian is working at a plant nursery after Kristoffer's fear of travelling caused their band to lose a record deal. This turns out to be also the reason he did not come with her to England.

Amidst all this Santa Claus comes to visit Pia.
