= Arild Østin Ommundsen =

Norwegian film director and screenwriter (born 1969)

- Born: August 5, 1969 (age 56); Stavanger, Norway
- Occupations: Film director and screenwriter
- Spouse: Silje Salomonsen

Arild Østin Ommundsen (born August 5, 1969) is a Norwegian film director and screenwriter.

== Early life and education ==
Arild Østin Ommundsen was born in Stavanger. He attended Stavanger University College, where he studied directing.

== Career ==
In 1999, Østin Ommundsen won the Gullstolen Award at the Short Film Festival in Grimstad with the film Før solen ståd opp (1999). He made his debut with the feature film Mongoland in 2001, for which he wrote the script together with Gro Elin Hjelle. The film won the Amanda Committee's Golden Clapper technical award in the 2001 Amanda Awards. Mongoland helped start the Stavanger wave in Norwegian film, and several of the actors that were involved have subsequently had great success. Østin Ommundsen has since directed and written the screenplay for Hjemsøkt (2003), Monstertorsdag (2004), Rottenetter (2009), Eventyrland (2013), Now It's Dark (2018), and Tottori! Sommeren vi var alene (2020). For Eventyrland he won an Amanda award and two Kanon Awards. He also received both the Aamot Statuette and the Rogaland Municipal Cultural Award in 2013. In 2011, Østin Ommundsen directed the third film in the film trilogy about Anne-Cath. Vestly's characters Lillebror and Knerten, Knerten i knipe. This was his debut as a director of a children's film.

== Family ==
Arild Østin Ommundsen is married to the actress Silje Salomonsen. They live in Stavanger.

== Filmography ==
- 1999: Før solen står opp (short)
- 2001: Mongoland
- 2003: Hjemsøkt
- 2004: Monstertorsdag
- 2009: Rottenetter
- 2011: Knerten i knipe
- 2013: Eventyrland
- 2018: Now It's Dark
- 2020: Tottori! Sommeren vi var alene

== Awards and nominations ==
- Nominated for the 2010 Amanda Award in the category best director for Rottenetter
- 2013 Amanda Award
  - Best cinematography for Eventyrland
  - Nominated for best director for Eventyrland
  - Nominated for best sound design and cinematography for Eventyrland (together with Gisle Tveito)
- 2013 Kanon Award
  - Best director for Eventyrland
  - Best producer for Eventyrland (together with Gary Cranner)
  - Nominated for best screenplay for Eventyrland
  - Nominated for best cinematography for Eventyrland
- 2013 Aamot Statuette
- 2013 Rogaland Municipal Cultural Award
- Nominated for the 2021 Amanda Award in the category best director for Tottori! Sommeren vi var alene (together with Silje Salomonsen)
