= Line Horntveth =

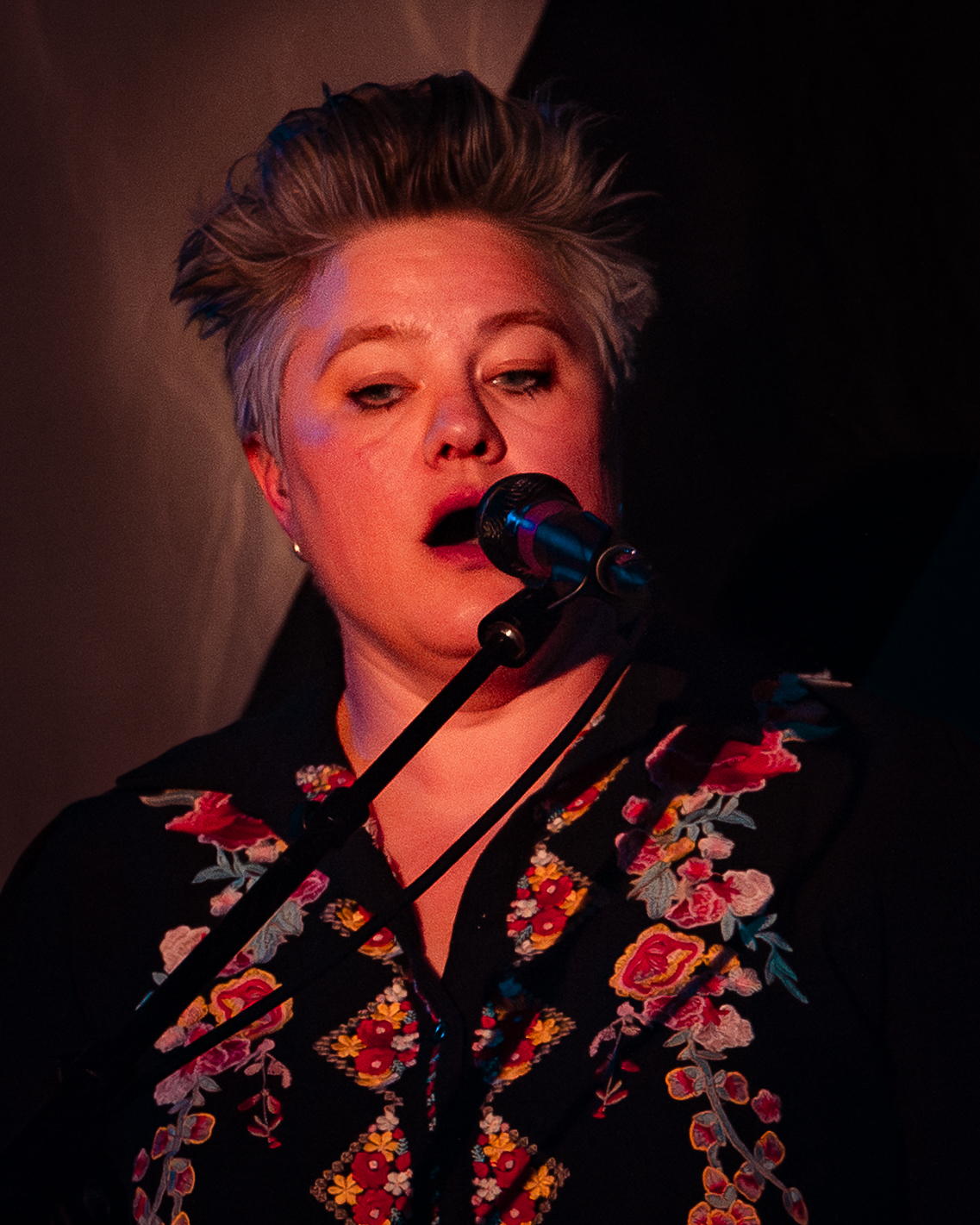
- Horntveth with Jaga Jazzist, 2021.

Background information
- Born: 26 November 1974 (age 51); Tønsberg, Vestfold
- Origin: Norway
- Genres: Jazz
- Occupations: Musician, composer, music producer
- Instruments: Tuba, flute, percussion, vocals
- Website: www.groove.no/artist/59385189/line-horntveth

Line Horntveth (born 26 November 1974 in Tønsberg, Norway) is a Norwegian musician (tuba, flute percussion, and vocals), the sister of the musicians Martin and Lars Horntveth, married to the upright bassist Bjørn Holm, and known from a series of recordings within Jaga Jazzist.

== Biography ==
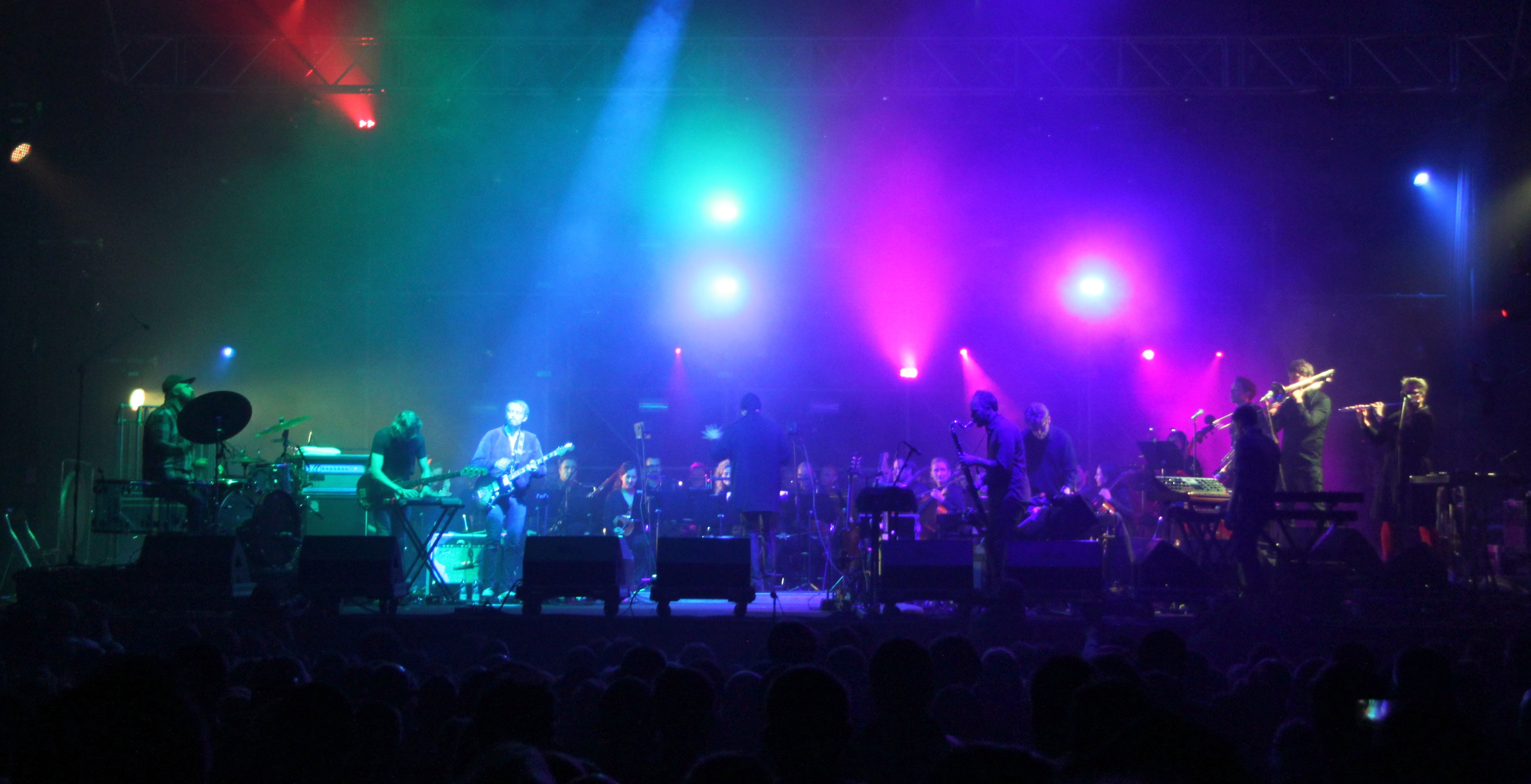
Jaga Jazzist at Tauron Nowa Muzyka 2014.

Horntveth got her Examen artium from the Tønsberg Gymnas in 1993. Her formal musical studies started at Toneheim Folkehøgskole and later she has attended studies at the University of Oslo.

Her latest project 'Budding Rose' released their debut album Where Were Ye All? (2013). This is a collaborative effort with the multi instrumentalist Terje Johanssen, known from collaborations with Lars Martin Myhre.

== Discography ==
Within Jaga Jazzist

- 1996: Jævla Jazzist Grete Stitz (Thug Records)
- 2001: A Livingroom Hush (Smalltown Supersound)
- 2002: The Stix (WEA International Inc.)
- 2003: Animal Chin (Gold Standard Laboratories)
- 2005: What We Must (Ninja Tune)
- 2010: One-Armed Bandit (Ninja Tune)
- 2013: Live with Britten Sinfonia (Ninja Tune)
- 2015: Starfire (Ninja Tune)

With Cato Salsa Experience

- 2000: A Good Tip for a Good Time (Garralda Records)

With Motorpsycho

- 2001: Phanerothyme (Columbia)

With The Lionheart Brothers

- 2007: Dizzy Kiss (Racing Junior)

With Marjit Vinjerui

- 2010: Friendly Fools (Vinjerui Records)

With Susanne Sundfør

- 2012: The Silicone Veil (EMI Music Norway)

With Flunk

- 2013: Lost Causes (Beatservice Records)

With Budding Rose

- 2013: Where Were Ye All? (Grappa Music)
