= Thomas Dybdahl =

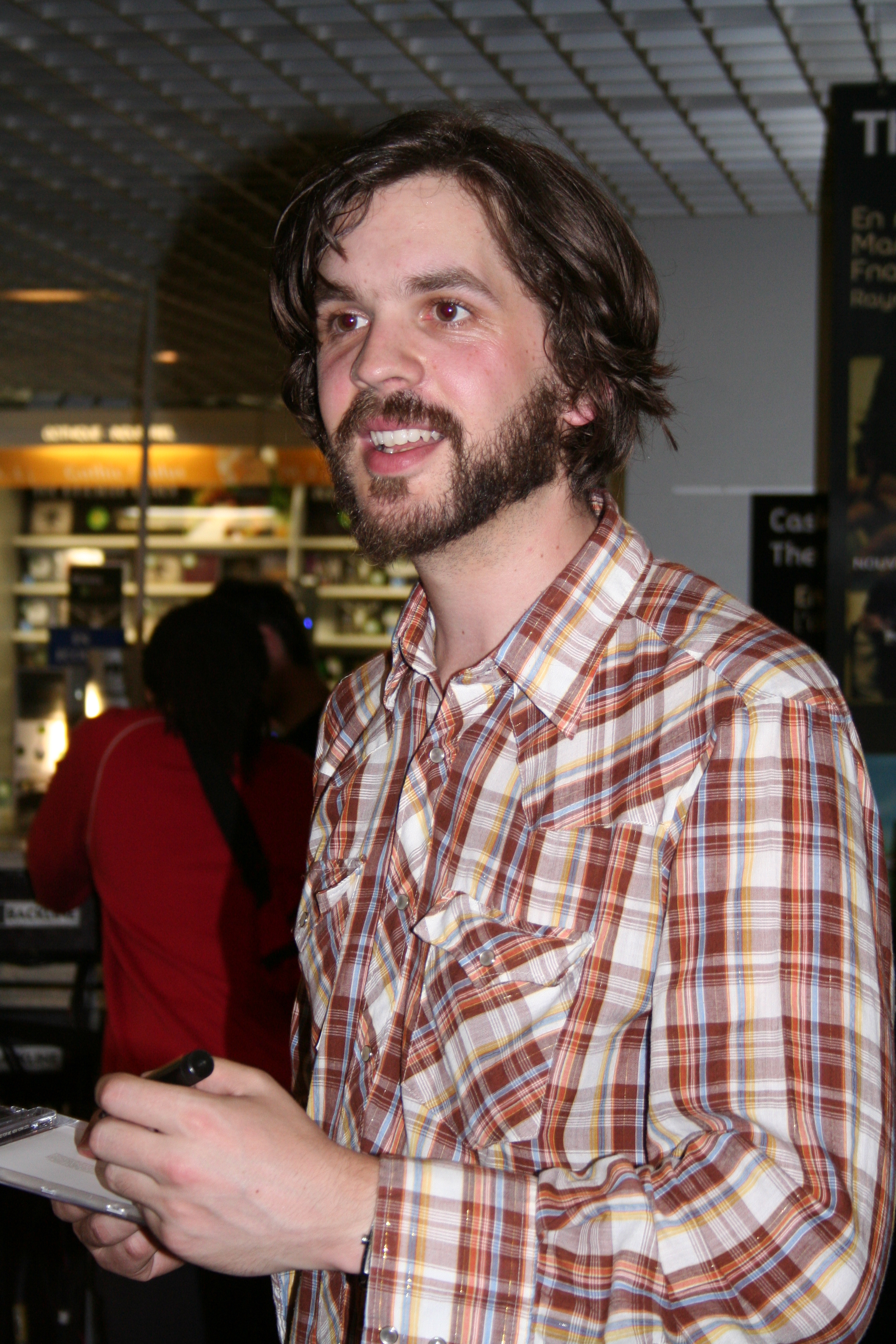
- Dybdahl in 2006

Background information
- Born: 12 April 1979 (age 47); Sandnes, Norway
- Instruments: Vocals, guitar, bass, percussion, harmonica, Hammond organ, mandolin, banjo, piano, harp
- Labels: Petroleum Records (Norway release only); V2BeNeLux
- Website: www.thomasdybdahl.no

Thomas Dybdahl (born 12 April 1979) is a Norwegian singer-songwriter and multi-instrumentalist.

== Background ==
Thomas Dybdahl grew up in Sandnes, Norway. He started his musical career as the guitarist in the band Quadraphonics. The band released one album in 2002 on Oslove Records.

== Career ==
Dybdahl's first release as a solo artist was the EP Bird, in 2000. His second EP, from 2001, was titled John Wayne.

Beginning with the release of his first album, ...That Great October Sound, in 2002, the first part of his "October" series, he received national and international appreciation for his work. Since then, and especially after the European release in 2004, Dybdahl's notability has increased significantly. The mostly positive reviews tout Dybdahl as a new pop wonder comparable to Nick Drake, Jeff Buckley and other solo artists. He received the Spellemannprisen and the Alarm Award for his work.

The release of his next two albums, Stray Dogs (European release in 2005) and One Day You'll Dance for Me, New York City, further increased his standing as a respected artist.

The album One Day You'll Dance for Me, New York City features the Norwegian philosopher Arne Næss speaking of quality of life, as a sort of interlude.

In 2004, Dybdahl teamed up with artists from the bands Jaga Jazzist and BigBang on the project The National Bank, which immediately entered the Norwegian charts with the project's self-titled debut album. It was released outside Norway in 2009.

His single "Damn Heart", written for the Danish movie En Soap, was released in 2006 on Copenhagen Records.

In 2007, Dybdahl performed as an opening act in the US for fellow Norwegian artist Sondre Lerche, and in 2011 he opened for Tori Amos during her Night of Hunters tour.

On 24 February 2017, his album The Great Plains was released. His eighth solo studio album, All These Things, came out on 12 October 2018.

== Discography ==
=== Studio albums ===
Album	Peak positions				
Album	NOR	DEN	FRA	NLD	BEL
...That Great October Sound: Year released: 2002; Record label: Checkpoint Charlie Audio Productions)	8	—	—	—	—
Stray Dogs: Year released: 2003; Record label: Checkpoint Charlie Audio Productions)	6	—	—	—	—
One Day You'll Dance for Me, New York City: Year released: 2004; Record label: Checkpoint Charlie Audio Productions)	1	33	—	—	—
Science: Year released: 2006; Record label: Universal Music	1	16	166	—	—
Waiting for That One Clear Moment: Year released: 2010; Record label: Universal Music	1	9	—	—	—
What's Left Is Forever: Year released: 2013; Record label: Petroleum/Sony Music	1	7	—	79	103
The Great Plains: Year released: 2017; Record label: Ferryhouse/V2	6	—	—	70	111
All These Things: Year released: 2018; Record label: 1MicAdventure/V2	18	—	—	—	178
Fever: Year released: 2020; Record label: 1MicAdventure/V2	11	—	—	—	—
Teenage Astronauts: Year released: 2024; Record label: 1MicAdventure/V2	—	—	—	—	—

=== Soundtracks ===
- 2006: Music from the Movie Rottenetter (1MicAdventure)
- 2015: This Love Is Here to Stay (House of Lies season 3, episode 11)

=== Compilation albums ===
- 2006: October Trilogy (box set featuring his first three albums, the remastered DVD and a bonus CD) (NOR #36)
- 2009: Thomas Dybdahl: En samling (NOR #9)
- 2011: Songs

=== EPs and singles ===
- 2000: Bird EP
- 2001 John Wayne EP
- 2003 Rain down on Me
- 2004 A Lovestory
- 2006: Damn Heart
- 2010: Cecilia
- 2015: Thomas Dybdahl & In the Country featuring In the Country, EP (vinyl and digital release)

=== Other releases ===
- 1998: Q, with the Quadrophonics
- 2004: The National Bank, with The National Bank
- 2008: Come On Over to the Other Side, with The National Bank
- 2008: Dive Deep, with Morcheeba

==== DVDs ====
- 2003: That Great October DVD (remastered in 2005)
- 2009: Live at Paradiso, Amsterdam DVD
