= Lars Horntveth =

Norwegian musician, band leader, and composer

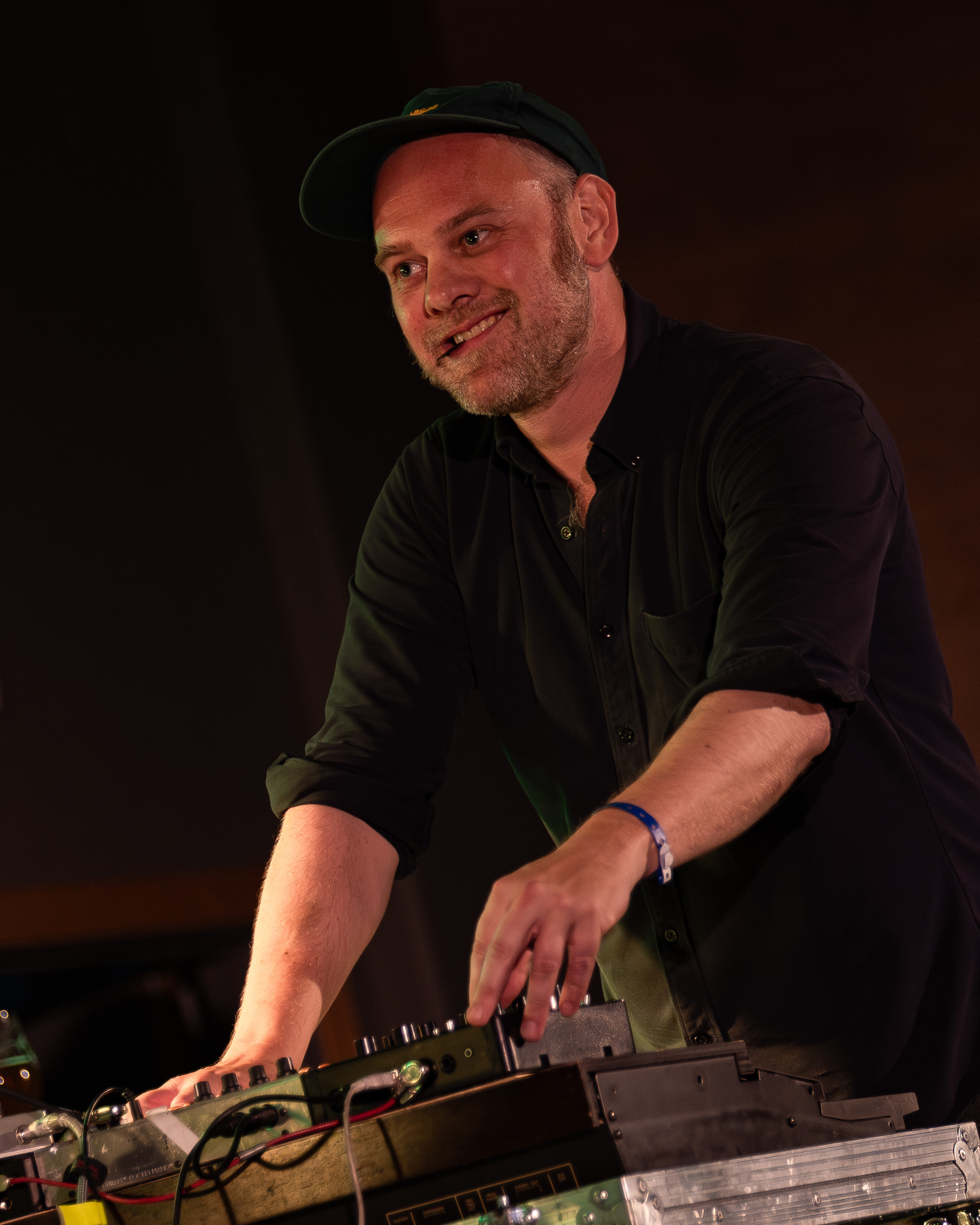
- Lars Horntveth with Amgala Temple 2021

Background information
- Born: 10 March 1980 (age 46); Tønsberg, Norway
- Genres: Jazz, rock, electronica
- Occupations: Musician, composer
- Instruments: Saxophone, clarinet, percussion, guitar
- Label: Smalltown Supersound

Lars Horntveth (born 10 March 1980) is a Norwegian musician (saxophones, clarinet, percussion and guitar), band leader, and composer. He was born in Tønsberg, the younger brother of tubaist Line Horntveth, but best known as a key member of the bands Jaga Jazzist and The National Bank, together with his brother, drummer Martin Horntveth.

== Career ==
In summer 2003 the brothers wrote a commissioned work to the "Vestfold Festival" in Tønsberg. The work was performed by the musicians who later became the band The National Bank. With his brother and the lyricist Martin Hagfors, he received the Edvard Prize in 2005 in the Class for pop music for the tune "Tolerate" from the band's debut album The National Bank.

In 2004 he released a solo album Pooka on Smalltown Supersound. For this he received Spellemannprisen 2004 in the class electronica and contemporary music, and Alarmprisen 2005 in the class jazz.

In 2008 he released his second solo album by the name Kaleidoscopic. The album consists of a 38 minutes long work, and is recorded with the Latvia National Symphony Orchestra. The album was released during the Øyafestivalen, with the Norwegian Radio Orchestra KORK.

In 2009 he played on the renowned Sonar Festival in Barcelona.

In 2017, he joined blues guitarist Amund Maarud and jazz drummer Gard Nilssen for the eclectic band project Amgala Temple. Their debut album Invisible Airships (2018) was nominated for the Spellemannprisen, open class.

Together with Natalie Sandtorv and Erlend Mokkelbost, he forms the band Orbits, which blends elements of jazz, soul, experimental pop, and electronica. The band originally emerged as a project for a commissioned work at Moldejazz 2022, under the name Glass. They received the NOPA Music Prize 2024 for the song "Synthetic Sweetness."

=== Cooperations ===
Horntveth is a widely used wind and string arranger for various artists like Turboneger, Ingrid Olava and Marit Larsen, and a studio and session musician for artists like Susanne Sundfør. By 2020 he has contributed to more than 150 releases by different artists.

== Honors ==
- Spellemannprisen 2004 in the class electronica and contemporary music, for the solo album Pooka
- Alarmprisen 2005 in the class jazz
- Edvard Prize 2005 in the class Pop music with The National Bank for "Tolerate" from the band's debut album The National Bank
- NOPA Music Prize 2024 with Orbits for the song "Synthetic Sweetness"

== Discography ==
=== Solo works ===
- 2004: Pooka (Smalltown Supersound)
- 2008: Kaleidoscopic (Smalltown Supersound)

=== Cooperative works ===
==== Within Jaga Jazzist ====
- 1996: Jævla Jazzist Grete Stitz (Thug Records)
- 1998: Magazine EP (dBut Records)
- 2001: A Livingroom Hush (Warner Music Norway)
- 2001: Airborne/Going Down EP (Warner Music Norway)
- 2001: Going Down 12" (Smalltown Supersound)
- 2002: The Stix (Smalltown Supersound / Warner Music Norway)
- 2002: Days 12", (Smalltown Supersound)
- 2003: Animal Chin EP 12" (Golden Standard Labs)
- 2005: What We Must (Ninja Tune / Smalltown Supersound / Sonet)
- 2010: One-Armed Bandit (Sonet)
- 2015: Starfire (Ninja Tune)

==== Within The National Bank ====
- 2004: The National Bank (Universal Music, Norway)
- 2008: Come on Over to the Other Side (Universal)

==== Within Amgala Temple ====
- 2018: Invisible Airships (Pekula Records)
- 2018: "Avenue Amgala" – single (Pekula Records)

==== Within Orbits ====
- 2024: "Synthetic Sweetness" – single (Jazzland)
- 2024: "Falling Apart" – single (Jazzland)
- 2024: Bad Mantras – EP (Jazzland)
- 2025: Blood Red Sky (Jazzland)

Awards
Preceded by Xploding Plastix	Recipient of the Elektronika/Contemporary music Spellemannprisen; 2004	Succeeded by Alog
