= Smalltown Supersound =

Norwegian record label

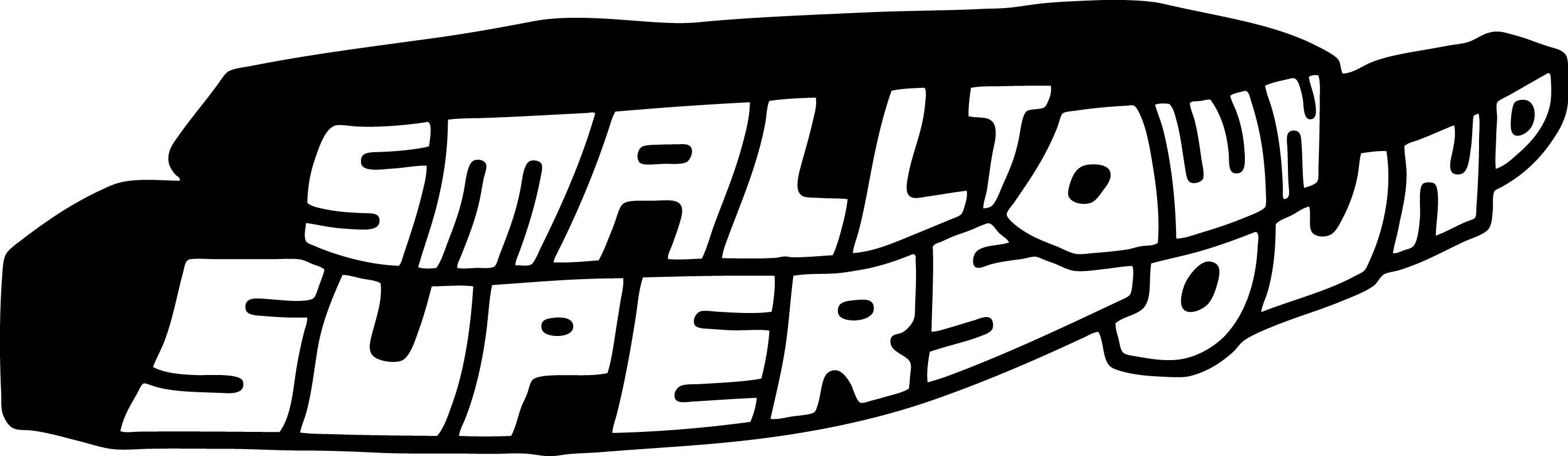
- Founded: 1993
- Founder: Joakim Haugland
- Distributor: Secretly Distribution (US)
- Genre: electronic; experimental; jazz; indie; rock
- Country of origin: Norway
- Location: Oslo/Flekkefjord, Norway
- Official website: www.smalltownsupersound.com

Smalltown Supersound is an independent record label, founded in Flekkefjord in 1993 and now based in Oslo, Norway. It is dedicated to new forms of jazz, rock and electronic music.

Their catalog features albums by Kelly Lee Owens, Deathprod, Neneh Cherry, Annie, Jaga Jazzist, 120 Days, Mental Overdrive, Bjørn Torske, Mats Gustafsson and Sonic Youth, amongst others.

== History ==
Smalltown Supersound was founded in 1993 by Joakim Haugland in the small town of Flekkefjord in southern Norway. At the time, the teenage Haugland was an active participant in the town's local DIY scene, centred on the festival Fjellparkfestivalen and the local rock club. "There was no vision and no plan, it was just one of many things I started when I was in my teens. I ran a club, a festival, a cinema club, a management and a record label. I guess the record label was what stuck" says Joakim about the origins of the label. Haugland founded the label to put out music by local indie and lo-fi bands, with the name being a combination of "smalltown" (referring to Flekkefjord) and "supersound", inspired by the fictional radio station K-Billy's Super Sounds of the '70s in Quentin Tarantino's movie Reservoir Dogs. The acronym and label catalog number "STS" was an homage to the influential American independent record label SST.

In the mid-'90s, Haugland relocated to the Norwegian capital Oslo and began working at Voices of Wonder, continuing to develop Smalltown Supersound as a side operation. At this point, the musical profile label began to drift more towards electronic music, free jazz and experimental music. An early milestone album for the label was the 2000 debut album by Kim Hiorthøy, Hei, followed by Jaga Jazzist's album A Livingroom Hush in 2002. The latter was named the best jazz album of 2002 by BBC.

Over the ensuing years, the label's profile grew increasingly international. It released albums by artists such as Neneh Cherry, Bruce Russell, Brian Reitzell, Kelly Lee Owens, DJ Harvey, Mats Gustafsson and Sonic Youth. However, Smalltown Supersound maintained a strong Norwegian presence in its roster, being one of the spearhead labels of the "Oslo disco" scene of the 2000s with artists such as Lindstrøm, Prins Thomas and Todd Terje.

Smalltown Supersound celebrated its 25th anniversary in 2018 with its own stage at the large Norwegian Øya festival, the first label to do so. The anniversary was commemorated by the compilation album The Movement of the Free Spirit, with tracks spanning the label's entire history remixed to a coherent musical piece by label stalwart Prins Thomas. In 2024, Smalltown Supersound collaborated with the Munch Museum in Oslo, where the label's artists provided music for the Edvard Munch exhibition Trembling Earth.

== Sub-labels ==
In 2004, the label launched the sub-label Smalltown Superjazzz to release "jazz with a punk attitude". The sub-label was cancelled in 2012, but reactivated in 2019 as the label series Actions for Free Jazz (AFJ-Series). In 2020, Smalltown Supersound also founded the label series Le Jazz Non (LJN-Series).

== See also ==
- List of record labels
