= Martin Horntveth =

Norwegian musician and composer

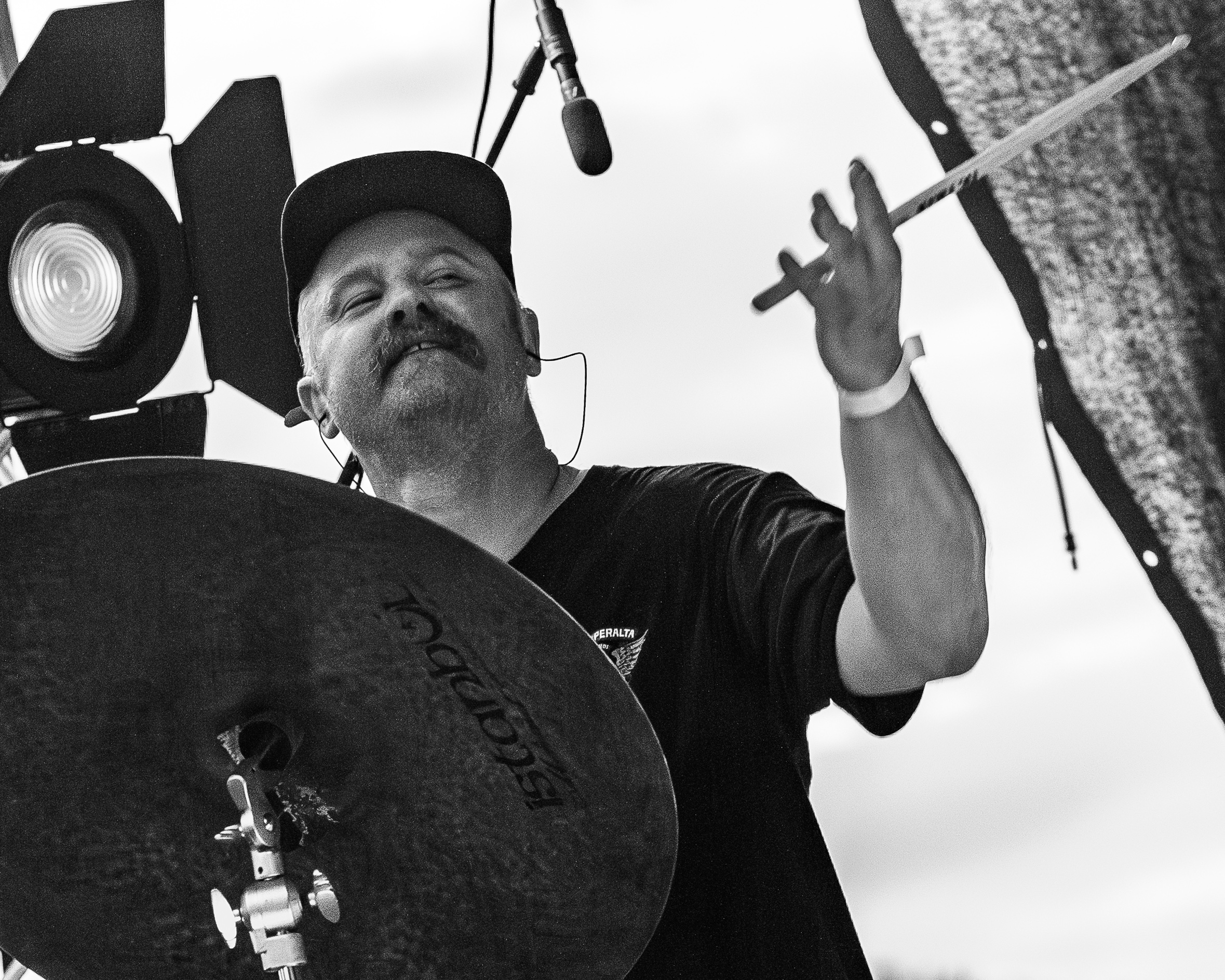
- Horntveth with Jaga Jazzist in 2021.

Background information
- Born: 20 September 1977 (age 48); Tønsberg, Norway
- Genres: Jazz, rock, electronica
- Occupation(s): Musician, composer
- Instrument: Drums
- Labels: Smalltown Supersound
- Website: Martin Horntveth on Myspace

Martin Horntveth (born 20 September 1977) is a Norwegian musician (primarily drummer), composer and electronica artist. He was born in Tønsberg, and is the younger brother of tubaist Line Horntveth, but is best known as the drummer and key member of Jaga Jazzist and The National Bank together with his brother Lars Horntveth.

== Career ==
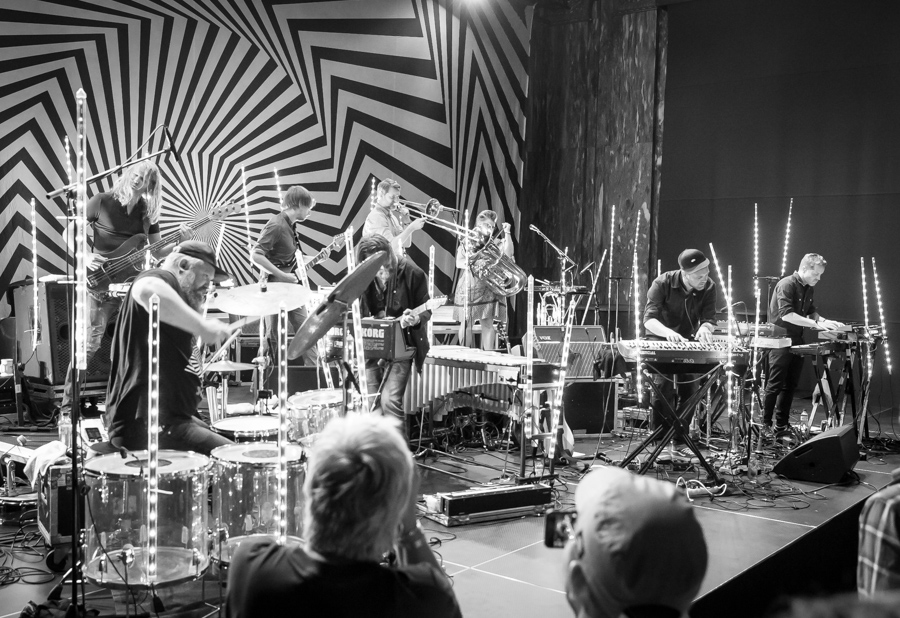
Horntveth with Jaga Jazzist at Sentralen during the 2016 Oslo Jazzfestival.

Together with Ravi (Ivar Johansen) he started in 1994 the band Jaga Jazzist, where he and his brother Lars are key members. In summer 2003 he and his brother Lars, wrote a commissioned work for Vestfold Festspillene in Tønsberg. The work was performed by the musicians who later became the band The National Bank. He received the Edvard Prize 2005 in the class pop music for the tune Tolerate from the band's debut album The National Bank, together with his brother Lars and the lyricist Martin Hagfors.

As a solo artist he has released two EP's with electronica music and toured the US and Europe. He also has a more pop/rock oriented solo project under the name Wolf Whistle where he plays all the instruments himself. Horntveth is also musician for the theater group Stella Polaris.

Horntveth has also been a drummer in Bigbang in the period 1997–1999, and was playing the drums on the album Electric Psalmbook. He has been a band leader for Bertine Zetlitz' backing band, and played with artists such as Anneli Drecker, Thomas Dybdahl and the band Home Groan. Horntveth has also written music for TV series Luftens helter and Himmelblå, and participated in the TV series Thursday evening with Steinar Sagen where he was musical director and studio musician in the fictional TV show. In 2003 he also became involved in a noise-rock side-project called Killl with Espen Hangård, Erlend Mokkelbost and Are Mokkelbost, which released a live DVD in 2011.

Horntveth played music for the theater troupe Stella Polaris, and has also established himself as a solo artist and composer for film, television and stage.

== Discography ==
- Fast Motion (Smalltown Supersound, 2002) EP
- Skull EP (Smalltown Supersound, 2003) EP
- Fast Motion/Skull EP (Smalltown Supersound, 2005) LP
