= Something Special – The Best of Bigbang =

Something Special - The Best of BigBang

Greatest hits album by BigBang
- Released: December 3, 2007 (Norway)
- Genre: Rock
- Label: Grand Sport/Warner Music

BigBang chronology
Too Much Yang (2007)	Something Special - The Best of BigBang (2007)	From Acid to Zen (2008)

Professional ratings
Review scores
Source	Rating
Aftenposten	5/6 stars
Dagbladet	5/6 stars

Something Special – The Best of BigBang is a compilation of greatest hits of the Norwegian rock band BigBang, released in Norway on December 3, 2007.

== Track listing ==
All tracks are written by Øystein Greni, with the exception of: "Long Distance Man", music by Egil Berg, lyrics by Greni; "In Your Heart", music by Jason Falkner and Greni, lyrics by Greni.

No.	Title	Album	Length
1.	"Wild Bird"	Electric Psalmbook	3:15
2.	"Saturn Freeway"	Poetic Terrorism	3:01
3.	"I Don't Wanna"	Too Much Yang	3:21
4.	"To the Mountains"	Clouds Rolling By	4:25
5.	"New Glow"	New Glow EP	3:15
6.	"Fly Like a Butterfly Sting Like a Bee"	Poetic Terrorism	3:25
7.	"Girl in Oslo"	Girl in Oslo EP	4:22
8.	"One of a Kind"	Frontside Rock'n'Roll	4:24
9.	"Long Distance Man"	Electric Psalmbook	3:50
10.	"Frontside Rock'n'Roll" (acoustic live)	Radio Radio TV Sleep	3:43
11.	"In Your Heart"	Previously unreleased	3:43
12.	"Early December"	Too Much Yang	3:02
13.	"Hurricane Boy"	Too Much Yang	2:33
14.	"All the Time"	Too Much Yang	2:37
15.	"From a Distance"	Poetic Terrorism	3:51
16.	"Smiling For"	Radio Radio TV Sleep	3:34
17.	"Something Special"	Electric Psalmbook	4:13

== Personnel ==
- Øystein Greni – vocals, guitar (all tracks), classical guitar (15), bass (2, 12, 16), drums (8, 16)
- Erik Tresselt – bass (1, 6, 9, 14, 15, 17), vocals (14, 15)
- Lasse Weeden – bass (3)
- Nikolai Eilertsen – bass (4, 5, 7, 8), organ (8, 16)
- Jarle Bernhoft – bass, vocals (11)
- Christian Engfelt – bass (13)
- Christer Engen – drums (1, 7)
- Olaf Olsen – drums (2, 3, 6–8, 11–15), vocals 15)
- Karim Sayed – drums (4, 5)
- Martin Horntveth – drums (9, 17)

Additional personnel

- Øystein Greni – producer (1– 4, 6– 8, 10)
- Michael Ilbert – producer (4, 5, 7)
- Nils B. Kvam – producer (9, 17)
- Jason Falkner – producer (11)
- Alexander Kayiambakis – photography (cover, booklet), design
- Fin-Serck Hansen – photography (booklet)
- Jan Erik Svendsen – photography (booklet)
- Jan Inge Janbu – photography (booklet)
- Nils Vik – photography (booklet)
