= Bjørn Klakegg =

Norwegian jazz musician (born 1958)

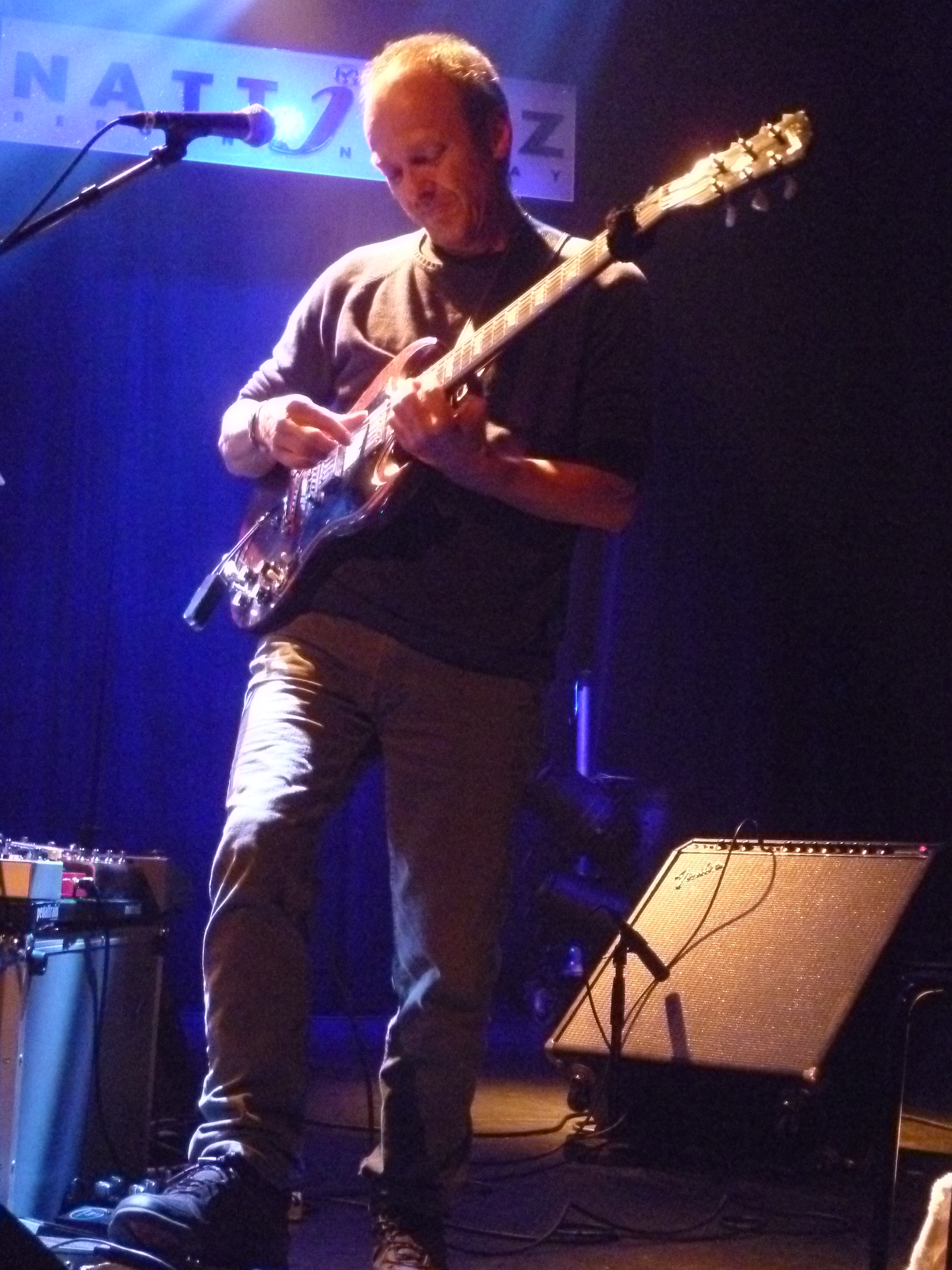
- Klakegg with Needlepoint at the 2016 Nattjazz in Bergen.

Background information
- Born: 30 January 1958 (age 68); Skien, Telemark
- Origin: Norway
- Genres: Jazz
- Occupations: Musician, composer
- Instrument: Guitar
- Label: Curling Legs

Bjørn Klakegg (born 30 January 1958) is a Norwegian jazz musician (guitar) and composer, known from a number of recordings and cooperations with the likes of Nils Petter Molvær, Sverre Gjørvad, Ernst-Wiggo Sandbakk, Frode Alnæs, Knut Værnes, Knut Reiersrud, Hanne Hukkelberg, Tove Karoline Knutsen, Terje Gewelt and Tore Brunborg.

== Career ==
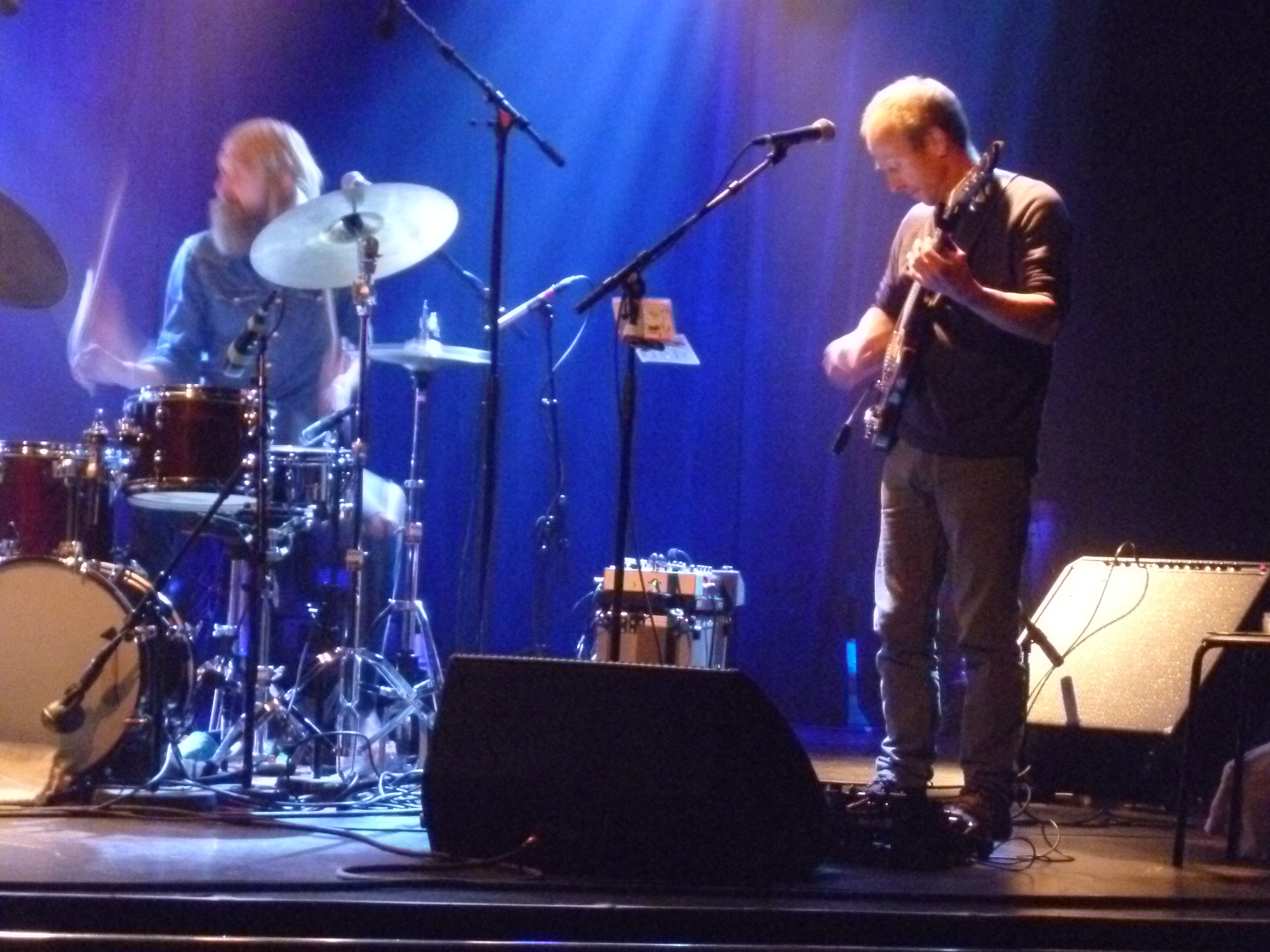
Olaf Olsen and Klakegg with Needlepoint at the 2016 Nattjazz in Bergen.

Klakegg was born in Skien. With his brother, the jazz pianist Rune Klakegg, he played in bands led by Guttorm Guttormsen when he was young. He studied music at "Toneheim folkehøgskole" (1978) and on the Jazz program at Trondheim Musikkonservatorium (1979–83). During his studies he established his own bands with among others his fellow students Nils Petter Molvær, Ernst-Wiggo Sandbakk, Frode Alnæs and Tore Brunborg, before he settled in Oslo and joined Sun, Extended Noise, Out to Lunch and Nuku. He plays in the Sverre Gjørvad Quartett and has otherwise contributed to releases by Tove Karoline Knutsen, Elsa Kvamme (1990) and Terje Gewelt (2004 and 2007). He leads his own quartet with Harald Skullerud (percussion), Andreas Utnem (keyboards) and Per Willy Aaserud (trumpet). In recent years he has toured with Rikskonsertene, in the production På hodet og bak frem, together with Celio de Carvalho and Nils Einar Vinjor, and contributed to the Ingun Bjørnsgaard projects with his compositions (together with Rolf Wallin). He has been a musician for several of NRK Radio Theatre's radio drama. He also plays in the group "Needlepoint" in collaboration with David Wallumrød, Nikolai Eilertsen (bass) and Thomas Strønen (drums), releasing the albums The Woods Are Not What They Seem (2010), Outside The Screen (2012) and Aimless Mary (2015).

== Discography ==
=== Solo albums ===
- 1998: Gloria (Curling Legs), with his own compositions together with Harald Skullerud
- 1999: Swing Waltz (Curling Legs)
- 2005: A day with no plans at all (Curling Legs), with his own compositions together with Harald Skullerud and Kåre Vestrheim
- 2008: Sidewalk View (BJK-music), with his own compositions together with Harald Skullerud, Andreas Utnem and Per Willy Aaserud

=== Collaborative works ===
Within Out to Lunch

- 1988: Out to Lunch (Odin Records)

With Needlepoint

- 2010: The Woods Are Not What They Seem (BJK Music)
- 2012: Outside The Screen (BJK Music)
- 2015: Aimless Mary (BJK Music)
- 2018: The Diary of Robert Reverie (BJK Music)
- 2021: Walking up That Valley (BJK Music)

With Karin Krog & John Surman

- 2013: Songs About This And That (Meantime Records), including with Ivar Kolve, Terje Gewelt & Tom Olstad

With other projects

- 1992: Det absolutte nullpunkt (Curling Legs), within Nuku
- 2000: 4G (Curling Legs), with Frode Alnæs, Knut Værnes and Knut Reiersrud
- 2006: Sundslegen, herja og naken (Tylden & Co.), with Lars Klevstrand, Rune Klakegg & Jan Olav Renvåg
- 2007: Rykestrasse 68 (Nettwerk), with Hanne Hukkelberg
- 2009: Lost Animals (2009), with Vidar Johansen Quartet
- 2013: Spindrift (Resonant Music), with Terje Gewelt
