= From Acid to Zen =

Compilation album by BigBang
- Released: September 9, 2008
- Studio: Grand Sport Studio; Studio 4 Recording
- Genre: Rock
- Label: Oglio Records
- Producer: Phil Nicolo; Øystein Greni

BigBang chronology
Something Special - The Best of Bigbang (2007)	From Acid to Zen (2008)	Edendale (2009)

From Acid to Zen is the second compilation album by the Norwegian rock band BigBang. It is the band's first album released exclusively for the American market and consists mainly of previously released material, in addition to two new songs, "The One" and "Savior Soul". It was released on September 9, 2008.

== Reception ==
David Fricke of Rolling Stone chose the album as his "Fricke's Pick", calling it a "big step in a bigger gamble", and described it as a "shotgun buffet, like those early U.S. LPs by the Beatles and the Rolling Stones that combined album tracks and singles from unrelated sessions, and it succeeds the same way: like an instant greatest-hits record".

== Track list ==
No.	Title	Album	Length
1.	"Early December"	Too Much Yang	3:03
2.	"Wild Bird" (2008 version)	Electric Psalmbook	3:26
3.	"One"	New release	3:21
4.	"Saturn Freeway"	Poetic Terrorism	3:01
5.	"Hurricane Boy"	Too Much Yang	2:34
6.	"My First Time"	Too Much Yang	3:23
7.	"Savior Soul"	New release	3:16
8.	"From A Distance"	Poetic Terrorism	3:52
9.	"Wherever You Are"	Poetic Terrorism	4:13
10.	"From Acid To Zen"	Poetic Terrorism	3:46
11.	"Where The World Comes To An End" (2008 version)	Frontside Rock'n'Roll	4:23

== Personnel ==
Bigbang

- Øystein Greni – vocals, guitars, mixer
- Øyvind Hoel – bass, backing vocals
- Olaf Olsen – drums, backing vocals

Additional personnel

- Phil Nicolo – producer, mixer
- Christian Engfelt – engineer
- David Larring – engineer
- Sylvia Massy – mixer
- Michael Ilbert – mixer
- Rich Veltrop – mixer
- Patricia Sullivan – mastering
