= David Wallumrød =

Norwegian pianist (born 1977)

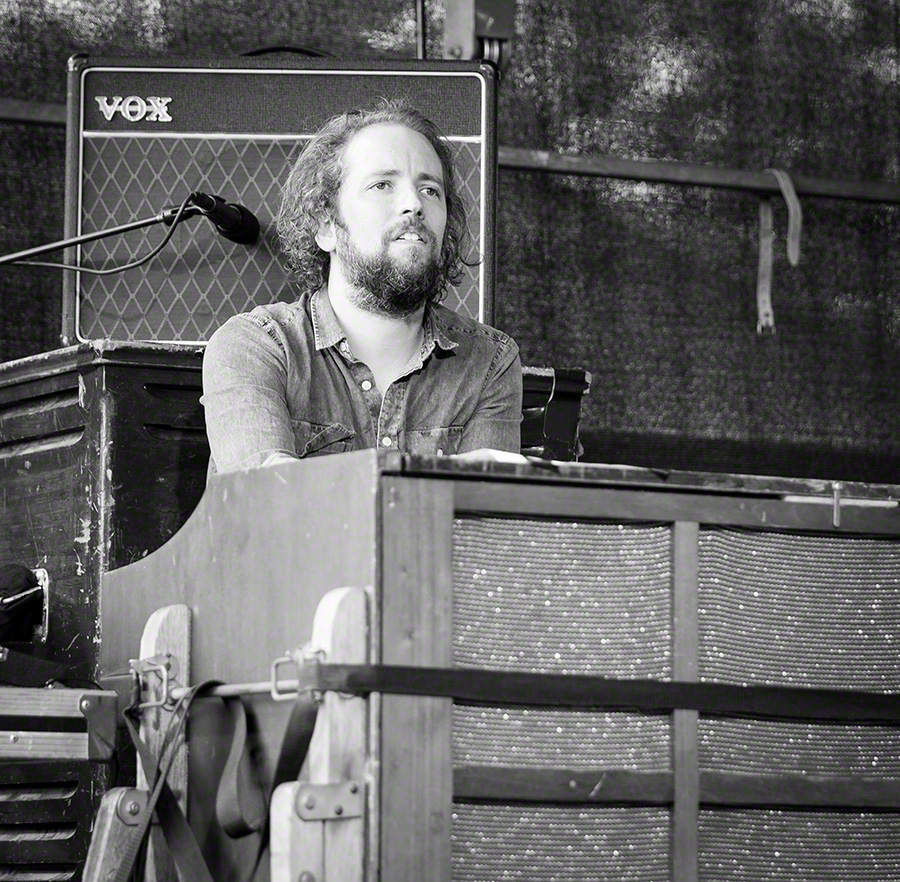
- Wallumrød at Piknik i Parken 2016

Background information
- Born: 2 October 1977 (age 49); Kongsberg, Buskerud, Norway
- Genre: Jazz
- Occupations: Musician and composer
- Instruments: Piano, organ, electronic keyboards
- Website: David Wallumrød on Facebook

David Wallumrød (born 1977) is a Norwegian pianist, known from cooperations with artists such as Knut Reiersrud, Torun Eriksen, Jarle Bernhoft, Marit Larsen, Maria Solheim, Vidar Busk, Bigbang, Maria Mena, Thomas Dybdahl and Bjørn Eidsvåg.

He is the cousin of the musical artists Susanna Wallumrød, Fredrik Wallumrød and Christian Wallumrød. David and Susanna has worked together on several occasions.

== Career ==
In 2015, Wallumrød formed the trio Spirit in the Dark together with Audun Erlien and Anders Engen. The band has released two albums: "Now is the Time" (2015) consists of stripped-down covers of gospel music while "Superbells" (2020) has cover versions of Christmas carols, psalms, and pop songs.

From 2012 to 2021, he was a member of the jazz-rock band Needlepoint.

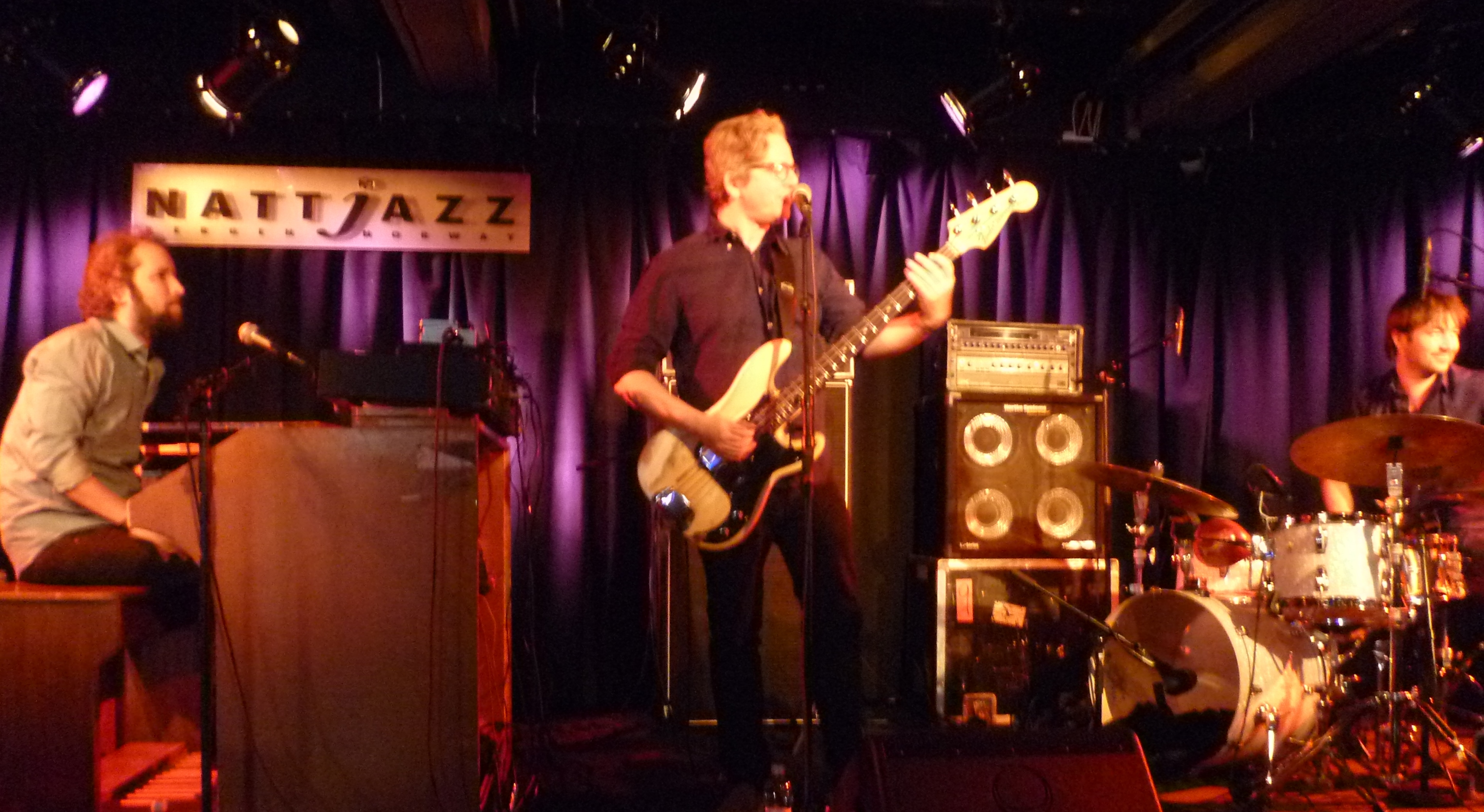
Wallumrød with Audun Erlien and Anders Engen at Nattjazz 2016.

Wallumrød contributed to the band "Cloudberry Cream" together with Nikolai Hængsle (bass) and Knut Reiersrud (guitar). Axel Røthe (drums) and his father Knut Røthe (guitar and vocals) were the main forces of this band project.

In the summer of 2013 Wallumrød and Kjetil Møster were guest artists at Bushman's Revenge's concert at Kongsberg Jazz Festival.

== Discography ==
With Southpaw

- 2004: Like I Do
- 2004: Move Out of Line

With Lester

- 2008: This Village (Deaf Ear Records)

With Cloudberry Cream

- 2010: The Rooftop Concert

With Needlepoint

- 2012: Outside The Screen (BJK Music)
- 2015: Aimless Mary (BJK Music)

Other projects

- 2002: Signs, with "Mosaic",
- 2002: Behind Closed Doors (Kirkelig Kulturverksted), with Maria Solheim
- 2002: Stolpesko (Warner Music Norway, Dagbladet, Frelsesarmeen), with various artists
- 2002: En håndfull håp, with Tore Ljøkjel
- 2003: Adjust You Stereo, with Ronnie Jacobsen & Salvador Sanchez
- 2003: Åpne mitt hjerte for deg, with various artists
- 2004: Shedding Skin, with Samsaya
- 2004: Frail (Kirkelig Kulturverksted), with Maria Solheim
- 2004: Mellow (Columbia Music), with Maria Mena
- 2004: Verve Today 2004 (Verve Records), with various artists
- 2004: These Days Do You No Justice, with Jake Ziah
- 2004: Lullabies From the Axis of Evil (Kirkelig Kulturverksted), with various artists
- 2005: Smooth Jazz Cafe 7 (Universal Music Polska), with various artists
- 2005: Serena Maneesh (Hype City Recordings), with Serena Maneesh
- 2005: 11–22 (Perfect Pop), with "The Loch Ness Mouse»
- 2005: I krig og kjærlighet, with "Evig Poesi»
- 2005: Forgetting to Remember (Tru Thoughts), with "Kinny & Horne»
- 2005: The Blueprint Dives (Century Media), with "Extol»
- 2005: Verve Today 2005 (Verve Records), with various artists
- 2005: Soulified, with Ronnie Jacobsen
- 2005: The Mirrors of My Soul (Kirkelig Kulturverksted), with Rim Banna
- 2006: Science (Universal Music, Norway), with Thomas Dybdahl
- 2006: Verve Today 2006 (Verve Records), with various artists
- 2006: Prayers & Observations, with Torun Eriksen
- 2006: Your Guide to the North Sea Jazz Festival 2006, with various artists
- 2006: Serena Maneesh (2006), with Serena Maneesh
- 2007: Will There Be Spring (Strange Ways Records), with Maria Solheim
- 2007: Too Much Yang (Warner Music Norway), with Bigbang
- 2007: Sonata Mix Dwarf Cosmos, with Susanna Wallumrød
- 2007: Seasons of Violet – Lovesongs from Palestine (Kirkelig Kulturverksted), with Rim Banna
- 2007: Songs From a Persian Garden (Kirkelig Kulturverksted), with "Mahsa & Marjan»
- 2007: Darkness Out of Blue (EmArcy), with Silje Nergaard
- 2008: Ceramik City Chronicles (Universal Music Norway), with Jarle Bernhoft
- 2008: Tattooed on My Eyes, with Martin Hagfors
- 2008: Hold on Be Strong (USM), with Maria Haukaas Storeng
- 2008: For du skin ikkje for deg sjølv – Norske artistar tolkar Olav H. Hauge (2008), with various artists
- 2008: Magiske kroker & hemmeligheter, Linn Skåber & Jacob Young
- 2008: Moments, with Jens Andreas Kleiven
- 2008: Pust (2008), with Bjørn Eidsvåg
- 2008: Stand Your Test in Judgement, with Ronnie Jacobsen
- 2008: Stayer (2008), with Lars Bremnes
- 2008: Voodoo Without Killing Chicken (Kirkelig Kulturverksted), with "Knut Reiersrud Band»
- 2008: Shockadelica – 50th Anniversary Tribute to the Artist Known as Prince, with "Prince Tribute»
- 2009: Lights and Wires, with Jake Ziah
- 2009: Best of Mosaic – 15th Anniversary, with "Mosaic»
- 2009: Thank You, with "Safari»
- 2009: April Blossoms (Songs from Palestine Didicated to All the Children (2009), with Rim Banna
- 2009: Isle of Now (Strømland Records), with "Montée»
- 2009: Vi som ser i mørket, with Siri Nilsen
- 2009: Men and Flies, with Martin Hagfors
- 2009: This Gig Almost Got Me Killed, with Ovidiu Cernăţeanu
- 2010: 1: Man 2: Band (Universal Music Norway), with Jarle Bernhoft
- 2010: All Good Things, with Thom Hell
- 2010: 7, with Unni Wilhelmsen
- 2010: Hav av tid, with Ola Bremnes
- 2010: S-M No. 2: Abyss in a Minor (4AD), with Serena Maneesh
- 2010: Starts and Ends, with D'Sound
- 2010: Passage, with Torun Eriksen
- 2010: Airwaves (Universal Music), with Bjørn Johan Muri
- 2010: One People – Volume 2: Teranga, with One People
- 2011: Kjærlighet og ærlighet 1, with Jan Eggum
- 2011: Solidarity Breaks (Universal Music Norway), with Jarle Bernhoft
- 2011: One Drop is Plenty (Valley Entertainment), with Knut Reiersrud & Mighty Sam McClain
- 2011: Jonas Alaska (Jansen Plateproduksjon), with Jonas Alaska
- 2011: Min Song Og Hjarteskatt (Kirkelig Kulturverksted), with Beate S. Lech
- 2012: Heilt Nye Vei (Brand New Path) (Ozella), with Elin Furubotn
- 2013: Cricklewood Broadway (Jazzland Recordings), with Beady Belle
- 2013: If Only As A Ghost (Columbia Music), with Jonas Alaska

Awards
Preceded by Ole Petter Andreassen and Kim Ofstad	Recipient of the Studio musician Gammleng-prisen; 2015	Succeeded by Kaja Fjellberg Pettersen
