= The Oslo Bowl =

Studio album by Bigbang
- Released: 1 March 2013
- Recorded: 2012
- Studio: Grand Sport Studio California; Rodeløkka Studio
- Genre: Rock music
- Label: Grand Sport, EMI
- Producer: Øystein Greni

Bigbang chronology
Epic Scrap Metal (2011)	The Oslo Bowl (2013)	Glory Chord (2019)

The Oslo Bowl is the ninth studio album of Norwegian rock band Bigbang. It was released in March 2013.

== Track list ==
All tracks are written by Øystein Greni. All lyrics by Greni and Andrew Pogany.

No.	Title	Length
1.	"Like Americans Do"	4:44
2.	"Little Heart Bomb"	3:05
3.	"The Oslo Bowl"	3:05
4.	"Lazy Eye"	3:54
5.	"Love Today"	4:39
6.	"In the Evening"	4:51
7.	"Dandelions"	3:56
8.	"No Place Nowhere"	3:06
9.	"Black Lights"	3:11
10.	"The World Is a Drumkit"	3:07
11.	"Song"	4:19

== Personnel ==
Bigbang

- Øystein Greni – vocals, guitars, percussion, producer
- Nikolai Hængsle Eilertsen – bass, piano, harmony vocals, co-producer
- Olaf Olsen – drums, harmony vocals, co-producer

Additional personnel

- Michael Ilbert – co-producer, mixer
- Jørn Christensen – co-producer, recording engineer (track 3), mixing (track 5, 11)
- Bryan Cook – engineer
- Tom Coyne – mastering
- Lissie – vocals (track 3)
- Linnea Dale – vocals (track 8)
- Sinikka Langeland – vocals, kantele (track 1, 5, 6, 7, 9, 11)
- Josh Moore – vocals, electric piano, electric organ (track 1, 4, 5, 7, 9)
- Erik Sollid – fiddle, violin (track 1, 3, 5, 6, 7, 9)
- Trygve Seim – saxophone (track 6)
- David Rawlings – guitar, banjo (track 7)
- Maria Orieta – guitar (track 7)
- Nikolai Torgersen – photography, artwork
- Øystein Ronander – management
