= Edendale (album) =

Studio album by BigBang
- Released: March 9, 2009 (Norway); January 19, 2010 (U.S.)
- Studios: Sound City Studios, Van Nuys, California
- Genre: Rock
- Labels: Grand Sport; Oglio Records
- Producers: Øystein Greni; Greg Richling

BigBang chronology
From Acid to Zen (2008)	Edendale (2009)	Epic Scrap Metal (2011)

Professional ratings
Review scores
Source	Rating
Bergens Tidende	6/6 stars
Dagsavisen	5/6 stars
Aftenposten	4/6 stars
Rolling Stone	3.5/5 stars

Edendale is the Norwegian rock band BigBang's seventh studio album (tenth in total), and the second album released to the American market. It was released on March 9, 2009 in Norway and in the U.S. on January 19, 2010. It was produced by Øystein Greni and Greg Richling of The Wallflowers.

== Overview ==
The album is named for a district north west of downtown Los Angeles, presently known as Echo Park and the eastern part of Silver Lake. It was generally received positively by critics.

== Track listing ==
All tracks are written by Øystein Greni, except where noted.

No.	Title	Writer(s)	Length
1.	"Play Louder"	Øystein Greni; Maria Orieta	4:51
2.	"Call Me"		2:37
3.	"Swedish Television"		4:41
4.	"Isabel"		6:30
5.	"Freeway Flowers"	Greni; Joshua Moore	4:04
6.	"Bag of Leaves"		4:54
7.	"To The Max"	Nikolai Hængsle Eilertsen; Greni	3:49
8.	"Jumpsuit"		2:11
9.	"Now Is Not a Good Time"		5:49
10.	"One Step at a Time"		2:54

Bonus tracks
No.	Title	Length
11.	"The One"	3:21
12.	"Savior Soul"	3:16

US edition bonus tracks
No.	Title	Length
11.	"Something Special"	4:12
12.	"Falling"	2:21
13.	"Wild Bird" (Live)	4:17

== Personnel ==
Bigbang

- Øystein Greni – vocals, guitars, producer
- Nikolai Hængsle Eilertsen – bass, percussion, harmony vocals, piano (track 7)
- Olaf Olsen – drums, percussion, harmony vocals

Additional personnel

- Greg Richling – producer
- Bryan Cook – recording engineer, mixer
- Adam Fuller – recording engineer (assistant)
- Chris Constable – mixer (assistant)
- Gavin Lurssen – mastering
- Joshua Moore – harmonium, harmony vocals, piano, organ
- Maria Orieta – guitar (track 1)
- Dave Natale – harmony vocals (track 3)
- Jared Nelson Smith – guitar (track 6)
- James Gadson – drums (track 7)
- Martin Winstad – congas (track 7)
- Torgny Amdam – harmony vocals (track 7)
- Dave Rawlings – guitar (track 9)
- Dave Larring – harmony vocals (track 9)
- Greg Richling – harmony vocals (track 9)
- Stian Andersen – photography (cover)
- Sølve Sæther – photography (booklet)
- Dimitri Kayiambakis – design
