= Clouds Rolling By =

Studio album by BigBang
- Released: August 21, 2000
- Studio: Athletic Sound
- Genre: Rock
- Length: 44:23
- Label: Warner Music Group
- Producers: Bigbang; Michael Ilbert; Nils B. Kvam

BigBang chronology
Electric Psalmbook (1999)	Clouds Rolling By (2000)	Frontside Rock'n'Roll (2002)

Professional ratings
Review scores
Source	Rating
Dagbladet	4/6 stars

Clouds Rolling By is the third album by the Norwegian rock band BigBang, released in 2000. The album was released on both CD and LP, with the latter being limited to 500 copies.

The album's producers were Michael Ilbert and Nils B. Kvam, along with Bigbang. Drummer Olaf Olson was fired in the middle of the recording process and replaced by Karim Sayed.

"Across the Street" LP version is an extended re-recording of the "Across The Street (Demo '99)" released in the 2000 Girl in Oslo EP.

== Track listing ==
No.	Title	Length
1.	"To The Mountains"	4:25
2.	"Girl In Oslo"	2:23
3.	"Sing And Dance"	4:04
4.	"Street Parade"	2:57
5.	"Right Beside You"	3:33
6.	"Telepathic Interview"	3:19
7.	"Better Than Before"	4:50
8.	"Summer Rain"	3:20
9.	"Come Alive"	3:49
10.	"Clouds Rolling By"	5:26
11.	"Across The Street"	4:57
Total length:		44:23

== Personnel ==
Bigbang

- Øystein Greni – lead vocals, lead guitar, piano, percussion, drums
- Nikolai Eilertsen – bass, baritone guitar, piano, glockenspiel, backing vocals
- Karim Sayed – drums, percussion, backing vocals

Additional personnel

- Michael Ilbert – producer
- Nils B. Kvam – producer
- Olaf Olsen – drums (track 2, 6, 7, 10 and 11), percussion (track 8)
- Christer Engen – drums and percussion (track 2), percussion (track 1 and 3)
- Lars Horntveth – reeds (track 1, 7 and 11)
- Svein Greni – saxophone (track 1 and 2)
- Tarjei Grimsby – trombone (track 1 and 2)
- Thomas Olsen – trumpet (track 1)
- Martin Winstad – congas (track 2)
- Øystein Bjørk – trumpet (track 2)
- Michael Libert – piano (track 4)
- Yngve Volent – cello (track 7), congas (track 11)
- Øyvind Brække – trombone (track 7 and 11)
- Terje Johannesen – trumpet (track 7 and 11)
- Bendik Bjørnstad Foss – viola (track 7 and 11)
- Emma Strømberg – violin (track 7 and 11)
- Sunniva Attedal – violin (track 7 and 11)
- Andreas Mjøs – vibraphone (track 11)
