= Needlepoint (band) =

Norwegian jazz-rock band

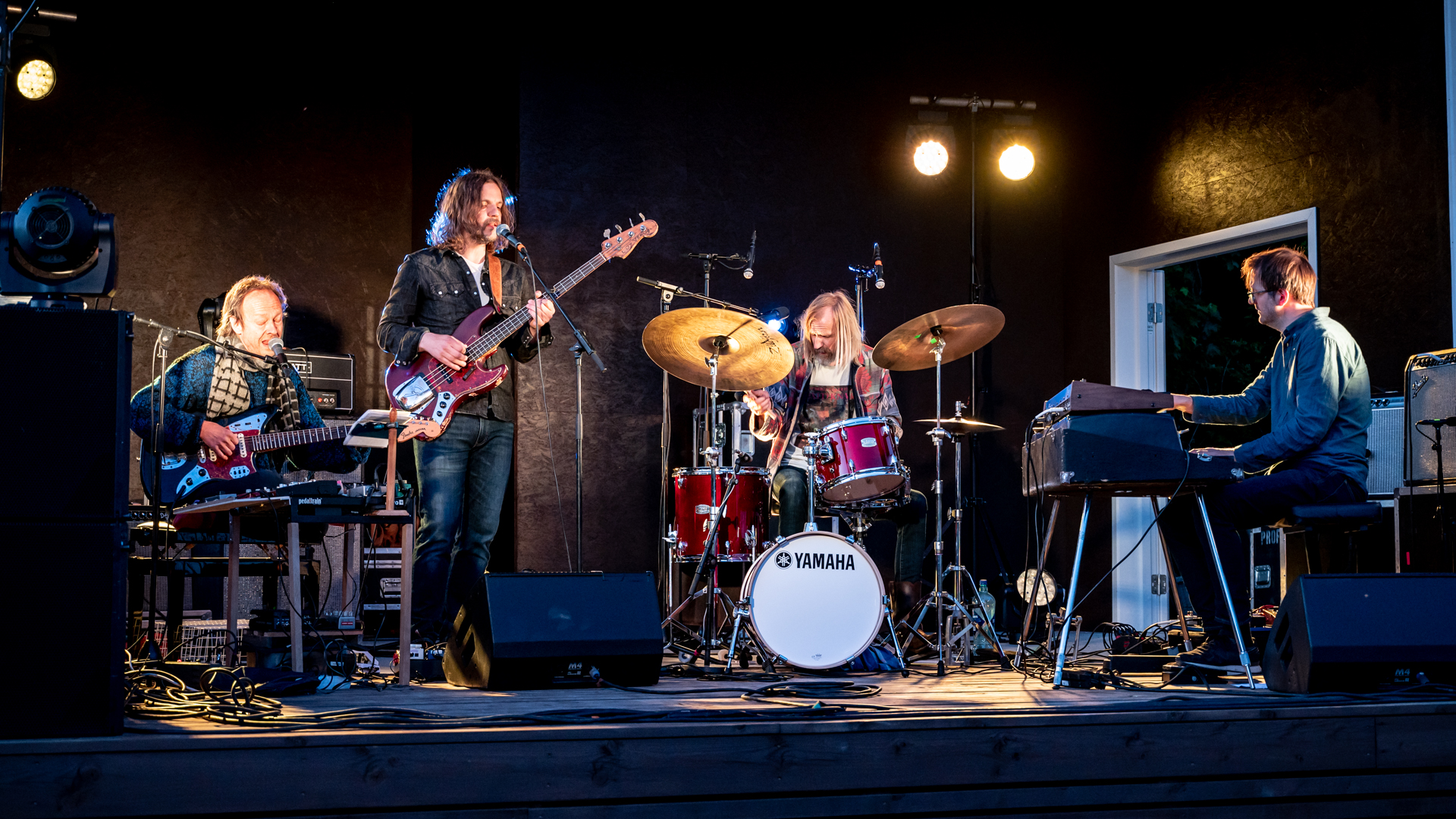
- Needlepoint at the 2022 Terrassejazz in Evje, Norway; Photo: Birgit Fostervold

Background information
- Origin: Oslo, Norway
- Genres: Prog-rock, jazz-rock
- Years active: 2010–present
- Members: Bjørn Klakegg; Nikolai Hængsle; Erlend Slettevoll; Ola Øverby
- Past members: Thomas Strønen; David Wallumrød; Olaf Olsen; Torjus Vierli (gig)

Needlepoint (initiated in 2010 in Oslo, Norway) is a Norwegian jazz-rock band.

== Biography ==
Needlepoint includes some leading Norwegian jazz musicians according to Tor Hammerø. The band started out as a trio with Bjørn Klakegg, Nikolai Hængsle and Thomas Strønen in 2010 releasing the album The Woods Are Not What They Seem (2010). David Wallumrød joined the team in 2012 and the album Outside The Screen was released the same year. Olaf Olsen known from Bigbang, replaced Thomas Strønen in 2014. He was replaced with Ola Øverbye, known from Fieh, in 2024. The latest album Walking up That Valley was released in 2021. They operate in a soundscape somewhere between psychedelic 1970's rock and jazz-rock.

Needlepoint have played at several festivals in Norway, at different clubs, and has also been touring in China. In November 2013 they played in Paris, and appeared at 2016 Nattjazz in Bergen, Norway.

== Band members ==
=== Current members ===
- Bjørn Klakegg - guitar, vocals
- David Wallumrød - keyboards (2012–present)
- Nikolai Hængsle - bass
- Ola Øverby - drums (2023–present)

=== Past members ===
- Olaf Olsen - drums (2014–2023)
- Erlend Slettevoll - keyboards, stand-in at gigs (2021)
- Torjus Vierli - keyboards, stand-in at gigs (2020)
- Thomas Strønen - drums (2010-2012)

== Discography ==
- 2010: The Woods Are Not What They Seem (BJK Music)
- 2012: Outside The Screen (BJK Music)
- 2015: Aimless Mary (BJK Music)
- 2018: The Diary of Robert Reverie (BJK Music)
- 2021: Walking up That Valley (BJK Music)
- 2024: Remnants Of Light (BJK Music)
