= Nikolai Hængsle =

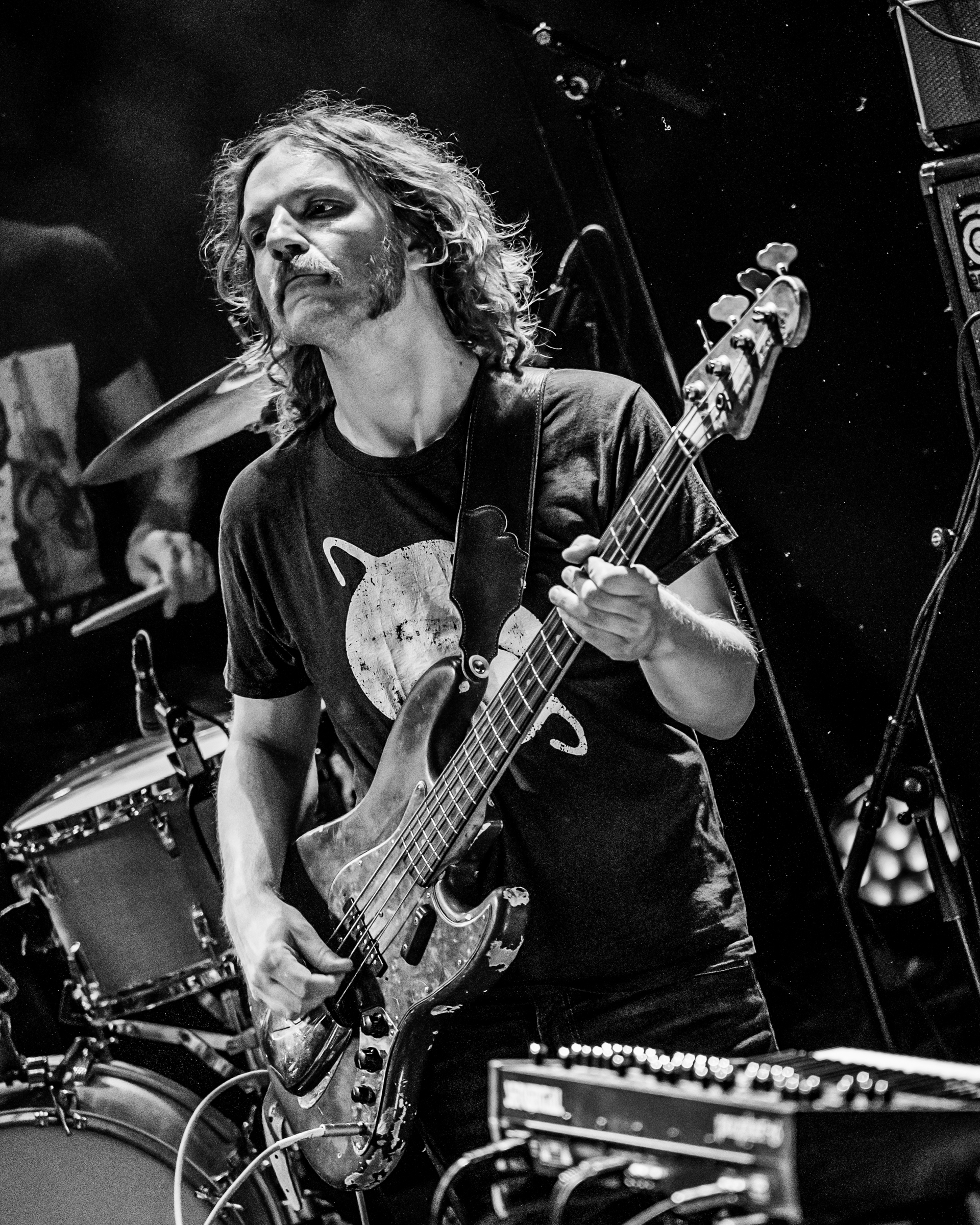
- Hængsle with Ola Kvernberg's Steamdome at Kongsberg Jazzfestival, 2023; Photo: Birgit Fostervold

Background information
- Born: Nikolai Hængsle Eilertsen; 24 June 1978 (age 48)
- Origin: Skotselv, Norway
- Genre: Rock
- Instruments: Bass, Keyboards
- Website: bigbang.no thenationalbank.no

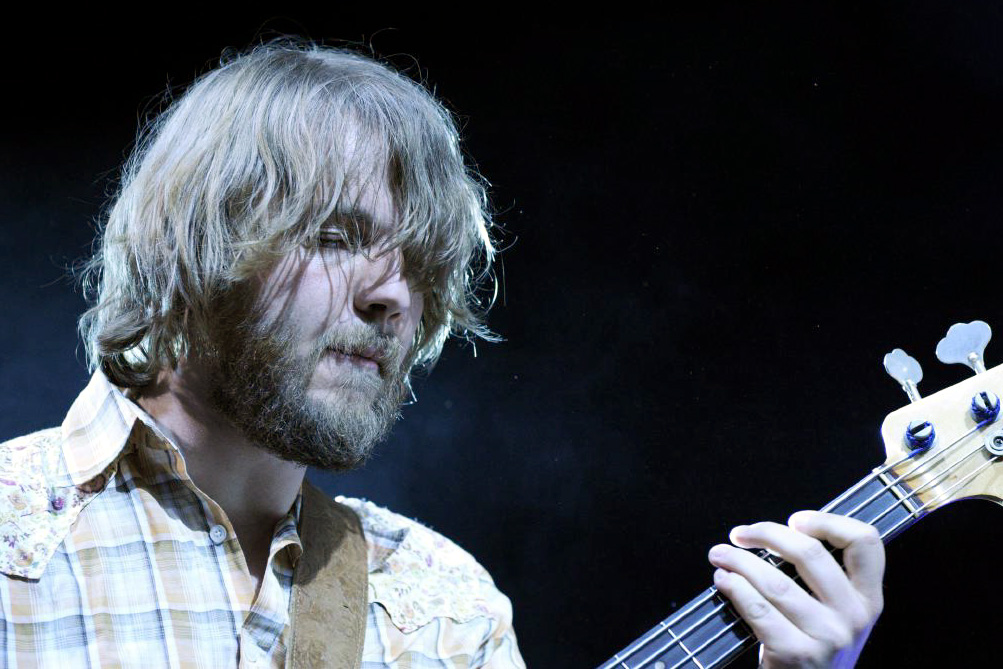
Nikolai Hængsle, moers festival 2009

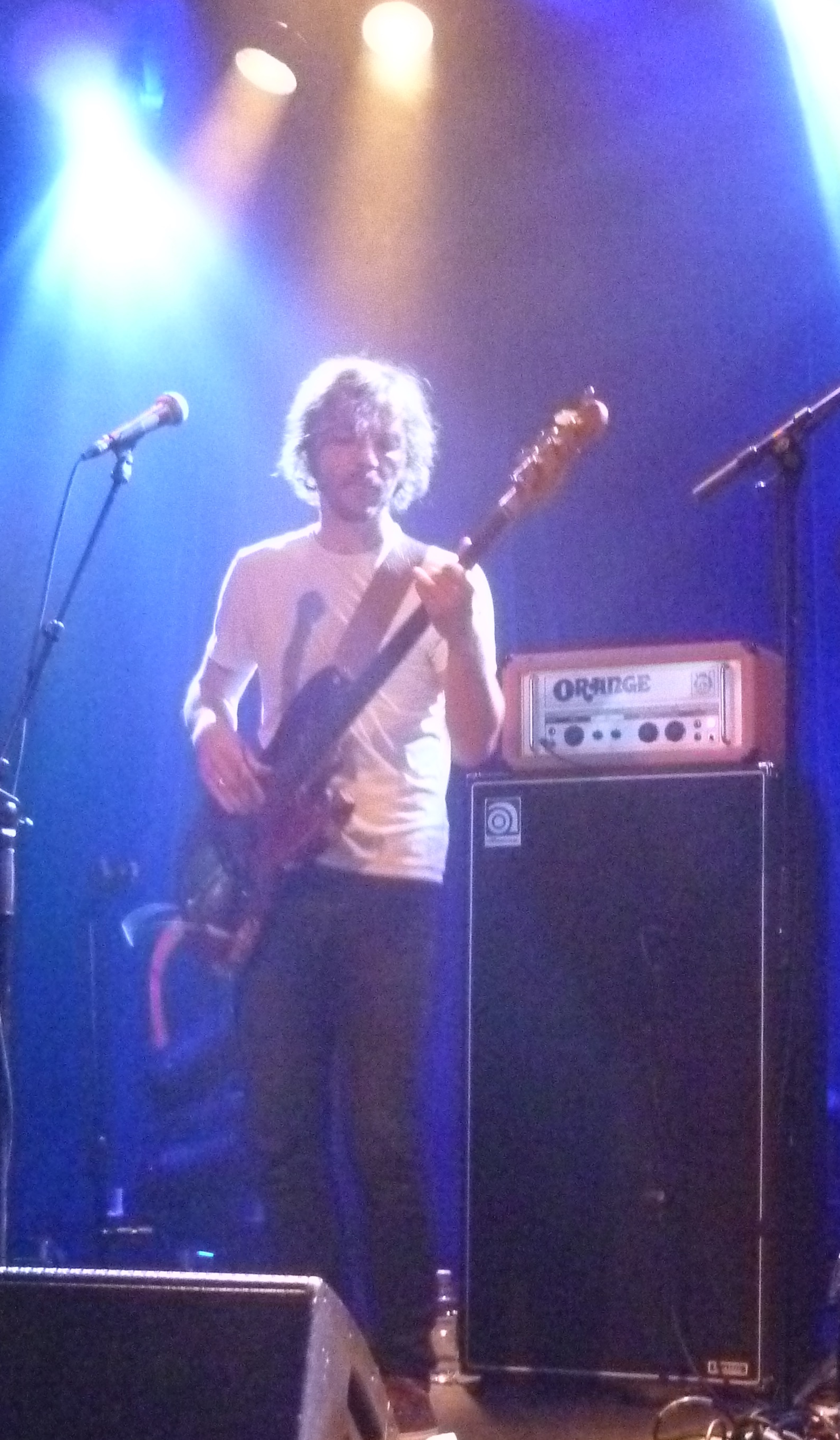
Hængsle with Needlepoint at the 2016 Nattjazz in Bergen.

Nikolai Hængsle (previously Nikolai Hængsle Eilertsen; born 24 June 1978) is a Norwegian bass guitarist. He is primarily known as a member of BigBang (1999–2004, 2009–present) and The National Bank (2004–present). Eilertsen, who was born in Skotselv, also participates in the bands Lester, Needlepoint and Elephant9.

== Honors ==
- Spellemannprisen 2004 in the class Pop band for the album The National Bank
- Spellemannprisen 2010 in the class Jazz for the album Walk the Nile

== Discography ==
Contributions by Nikolai Eilertsen:

With Bigbang

Albums:

- Electric Psalmbook (Grand Sport Records, 1999)
- Clouds Rolling by (Warner Music, 2000)
- Frontside Rock'n'Roll (Warner Music Norway, 2002)
- Radio Radio TV Sleep (Warner Music Norway, 2003), live
- Poetic Terrorism (Grand Sport Records, 2005)
- Too Much Yang (Grand Sport Records, 2007)
- Something Special – The Best of Bigbang (Grand Sport Records, 2005), compilation
- From Acid to Zen (Oglio Records, 2008)
- Edendale (Oglio Records, 2009)
- Epic Scrap Metal (Grand Sport Records, 2011)

EP's:

- Girl in Oslo (Warner Music Norway, 2000)
- New Glow (Warner Music Norway, 2000)
- Smiling for (Warner Music Norway, 2001)
- Not A Rolling Stone (Grand Sport Records, 2005)
- Fly Like A Butterfly Sting Like A Bee (Grand Sport Records, 2005)
- Saturn Freeway (Glitterhouse Records, 2006)
- Hurricane Boy (Grand Sport Records, 2007)
- Wild Bird E.P. (Grand Sport Records, 2008)
- Isabel (Grand Sport Records, 2009)

With The National Bank

- The National Bank (2004)
- Come On Over to the Other Side (2008)

With Thomas Dybdahl

- Science (Universal Music Norway, 2006)

With Knut Reiersrud Band

- Voodoo Without Killing Chicken (2008)

With Knut Reiersrud

- Gitar (Universal Music, 2009)

With Bjørn Eidsvåg

- Pust (Petroleum Records/Sony Music, 2008)

With Lester

- This Village (Deaf Ear/Mudi, 2008)

With Elephant9

- Dodovoodoo (Rune Grammofon, 2008)
- Walk the Nile (Rune Grammofon, 2010)
- Live at the BBC (Rune Grammofon, 2011)
- Atlantis (Rune Grammofon, 2012), with Reine Fiske

With Needlepoint

- The Woods Are Not What They Seem (BJK Music/Musikkoperatørene, 2010)
- Outside The Screen (BJK Music/Musikkoperatørene, 2012)
- Aimless Mary (BJK Music/Musikkoperatørene, 2015)

With Band of Gold including Nina Elisabeth Mortvedt

- Band of Gold (Jansen Plateproduksjon, 2015)

With various artists

- Sivil Ulyd 2: Sivilarbeiderplata (Passive Fist Productions, 2003), compilation
- Susanne Sundfør – Ten Love Songs

With Lars Fredrik Frøislie

- Fire Fortellinger (Karisma Records, 2023)
