= Epic Scrap Metal =

Studio album by Bigbang
- Released: March 4, 2011
- Studio: Grand Sport Studio California
- Genre: Rock music
- Label: Grand Sport, EMI
- Producer: Øystein Greni

Bigbang chronology
Edendale (2009)	Epic Scrap Metal (2011)	The Oslo Bowl (2013)

Professional ratings
Review scores
Source	Rating
Aftenposten	5/6 stars
Dagbladet	5/6 stars
NRK: Lydverket	5/6 stars
Verdens Gang	5/6 stars

Epic Scrap Metal is the Norwegian rock band BigBang's eighth studio album. It was released on March 4, 2011, and debuted at number 1 on the Norwegian Albums Chart on its first week of release. The album stayed on top of the chart for four consecutive weeks and spent a total of 21 weeks on the Norwegian charts.

== Overview ==
The album's title draws upon a metal recycling plant in California, named "Star Scrap Metal". Among the guest artist appearances on the album is a duet with American singer Lissie on the song "No One".

== Track listing ==
All tracks are written by Øystein Greni and Andrew Pogany, except were noted.

No.	Title	Writer(s)	Length
1.	"How Things Rot"		2:02
2.	"Everybody and Their Broken Hearts"		4:15
3.	"Cigarette"		3:41
4.	"Deserve Everything"		2:56
5.	"New Woman"		4:33
6.	"No One"		3:06
7.	"Cities of the Plain"	Thom Hell; Øystein Greni; Andrew Pogany	4:57
8.	"Don't Kill My Buzz"	Greni; Pogany; Thomas Seltzer	3:25
9.	"Nothing Finished Yet"		4:42
10.	"Cape"		4:38
11.	"Don't Believe in Change"		4:01
12.	"Epic Scrap Metal"		4:43

Deluxe edition/iTunes bonus track
No.	Title	Length
13.	"Magic Hour"	7:32

== Personnel ==
Bigbang

- Øystein Greni – lead vocals, guitars. bass, drums
- Nikolai Hængsle Eilertsen – bass, piano, vocals
- Olaf Olsen – drums, vocals

Additional personnel

- Lissie – vocals (track 6)
- Thom Hell – vocals (track 7)
- Joshua Moore – piano (track 2, 4, 10, 11)
- Michael Ilbert – mixer
- Bryan Cook – technician
- Martin Bowitz – technician
- Christian Engfelt – technician
- Ryan Smith – mixer
- George Marino – mastering
- Andrew Pogany – backing vocals (track 3)
- Mike Green – backing vocals (track 3)
- Joel Isaac Black – backing vocals (track 3)
- Jordan Ladyface – backing vocals (track 3)
- Timberlie Preite – backing vocals (track 3)
- Micah Preite – backing vocals (track 3)
- Mazie Preite – backing vocals (track 3)
- Keiko Hoshi – backing vocals (track 3)
- Camilla Green – backing vocals (track 3)
- Austen Hooks – backing vocals (track 5)
- Greg Richling – vocal coach (track 2)
- Sølve Sæther – photography
- Dimitri Kayiambakis – artwork
