= Nils Einar Vinjor =

Norwegian guitarist (born 1962)

- Born: 15 December 1962 (age 63); Øvre Årdal, Sogn og Fjordane
- Origin: Norway
- Genres: Jazz
- Occupations: Musician, composer
- Instrument: Guitar
- Website: myspace.com/nilseinarvinjor

Nils Einar Vinjor (born 15 December 1962 in Øvre Årdal, Norway) is a Norwegian guitarist known for his solo albums and the collaboration with musicians like Silje Nergaard, Iver Kleive and Knut Reiersrud.

== Career ==
Vinjor, residing in Oslo, is known in Norway as a central guitarist and composer on the Norwegian musical scene. As a freelance musician Vinjor played together with a number of famous Norwegian performers, and also toured in several European countries and East-Asia. In 1997 he released the solo album Sjonglør with music in the generes jazz, rock and blues, and later the album Silent Traveler (2004).

== Discography ==
=== Solo albums ===
- 1997: Sjonglør (Skald AS)
- 2004: Silent Traveler (Virgin Records)

=== Collaborations ===
With Silje Nergaard

- 1990: Tell me Where You're Going (Sonet Music)
- 1996: Hjemmefra (Kirkelig Kulturverksted)
- 2003: Nightwatch (EmArcy)
- 2005: Be Still my Heart - the Essential (EmArcy)
- 2007: Darkness Out Of Blue (EmArcy)
- 2012: Unclouded (Sony Music)

With Iver Kleive and Knut Reiersrud

- 1991: Blå Koral (Kirkelig Kulturverksted)

With Jonas Fjeld

- 1993: Texas Jensen (Stageway Records)

With Tove Nilsen

- 1995: Fly - Over (Self Releace)

With Havrøy & Johnsen

- 2004: Den Lange Taushet (Park Grammofon)

With Tirill_Mohn

- 2003: A Dance with the Shadows (The Wild Places)
- 2011: Tales from Tranquil August Gardens (FairyMusic)
- 2011: Nine And Fifty Swans (FairyMusic)
- 2013: Um Himinjǫður (FairyMusic)
