= Poetic Terrorism =

Studio album by BigBang
- Released: April 2005
- Studios: Grand Sport Studios; The Slovak Radio Studios (Note: Recording of The Bratislava Symphony Orchestra)
- Genre: Rock music
- Length: 39:04
- Label: Grand Sport
- Producer: Øystein Greni

BigBang chronology
Radio Radio TV Sleep (2003)	Poetic Terrorism (2005)	Too Much Yang (2007)

Professional ratings
Review scores
Source	Rating
Dagbladet	5/6 stars
Verdens Gang	5/6 stars

Poetic Terrorism is the fifth studio album by the Norwegian rock band BigBang, released in April 2005. The album was produced by Øystein Greni and recorded at his Grand Sport Studios. It was mixed by American producer and engineer Sylvia Massy, renowned for her work with Tom Petty, Prince, R.E.M. and Johnny Cash.

== Overview ==
Øystein Greni described the record as minimalistic and reminiscent of the Dinosaur Jr. and Hüsker Dü era punk rock. According to the frontman, what sets the album apart is its minimalistic indie production and variety. This is Bigbang's first album without an instrumental track or acoustic ballad.

It is also the band's first album since Waxed in 1995 to be released through Greni's Grand Sport Records indie label. The four-year deal with Warner Norway ended with Radio Radio TV Sleep as Greni chose to produce his own records.

A different version of "On Your Mind" was previously released on the Smiling For EP in 2001. An alternative version of "Not a Rolling Stone" appeared on a two-track EP of the same name, released later in 2005, which also included documentary footage and a Saturn Freeway video.

== Track listing ==
All tracks are written by Øystein Greni, except where noted.

No.	Title	Writer(s)	Length
1.	"Saturn Freeway"		3:05
2.	"Fly Like a Butterfly..."		3:28
3.	"Wherever You Are"		4:13
4.	"Looking Good From a Distance"		3:52
5.	"From Acid to Zen"	Erik Tesselt; Øystein Greni	4:00
6.	"Head Over Heels"		3:27
7.	"Not a Rolling Stone"		3:40
8.	"On Your Mind"		3:24
9.	"The Gullwing Groove"		3:22
10.	"Going Home"	Ando Woltmann; Per Schimmel	2:52
11.	"Music in Me"	Maria Orieta; Greni	3:41
Total length:			39:04

== Personnel ==
Bigbang

- Øystein Greni – lead vocals, guitars, percussion
- Erik Tresselt – bass, backing vocals
- Olaf Olsen – drums, percussion, backing vocals

Additional personnel

- Christian Engfelt – engineer
- Helge Sten – engineer (additional)
- Nils B. Kvam – engineer (additional)
- Sylvia Massy Shivy – mixer
- Kalé Holmes – mixer (assistant)
- Rich Veltrop – mixer (assistant)
- Vlado Meller – mastering
- Ståle Storløkken – keyboards (track 3, 4, 9 and 10)
- Nikolai Eilertsen – guitar (track 8), piano (track 7)
- Christer Engen – drums (track 8)
- Hege Rimestad – violin (track 2)
- Lise Sørensen – violin (track 2)
- Bjørn Asper – horns (track 7)
- Svein Greni – horns (track 7)
- Tarjei Grimsby – horns (track 7)
- Tara Creme – arrangements (track 11)
- David Hernando – conductor (track 11)
- The Bratislava Symphony Orchestra – orchestra (track 11)
- Maria Orieta – piano (track 11)
- Thor S. Greni – creative supervisor (track 2 and 4)
- Joachim Trier – creative supervisor (track 1, 3, 5 and 11)
- Nils Vik – photograph
- Sebastian Ludvigsen – photograph
- Dimitri Kayiambakis – artwork
