= Torun Eriksen =

Norwegian jazz singer

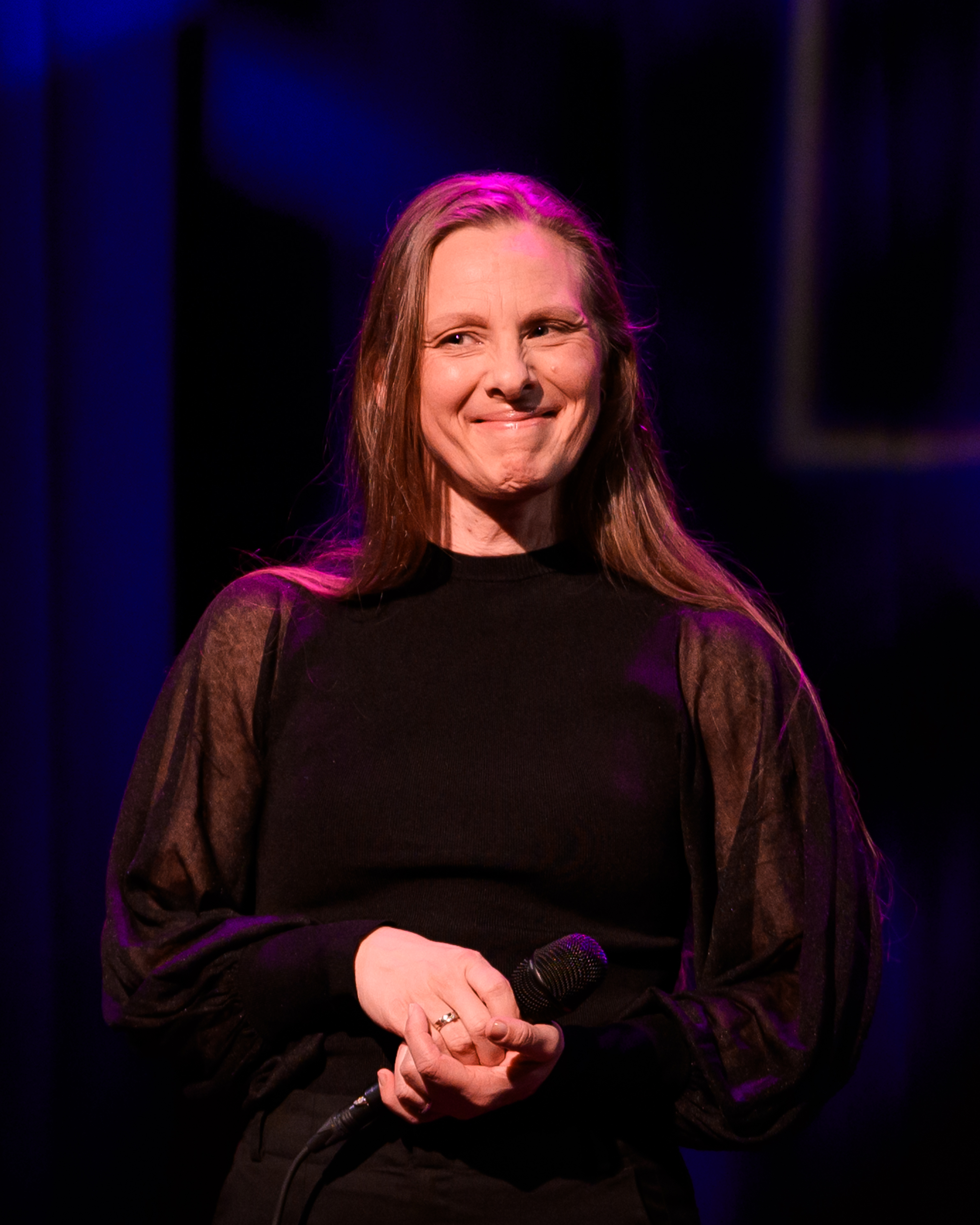
- Torun Eriksen in 2025

Background information
- Born: January 8, 1977 (age 49); Lunde, Telemark, Norway
- Genres: Jazz, Norwegian music
- Occupations: Musician, composer
- Instrument: Vocals
- Label: Jazzland
- Website: toruneriksen.no

Torun Eriksen (born 8 January 1977 in Lunde, Telemark) is a Norwegian jazz singer, whose musical talents first came to prominence as a music student at high school in Norway.

Eriksen was born in Lunde, Telemark. From the age of six, she sang in various gospel choirs, and by the age of 19 had become a featured soloist. With a background steeped in soul, jazz, pop, and through her choral experience she began writing her first compositions. A major influence was the world of jazz standards via the Real Book. After moving to Oslo in 1997, she enrolled at the Norwegian Institute for Stage and Studio.

== Discography ==
- Glittercard (Jazzland, 2003)
- Prayers & Observations (Jazzland, 2005)
- Passage (Jazzland, 2010)
- Visits (Jazzland, 2013), with David Wallumrød (keyboards), Audun Erlien (bass) and Ola Hultgren (drums)
- Grand White Silk (Jazzland, 2016)
