= Knut Reiersrud =

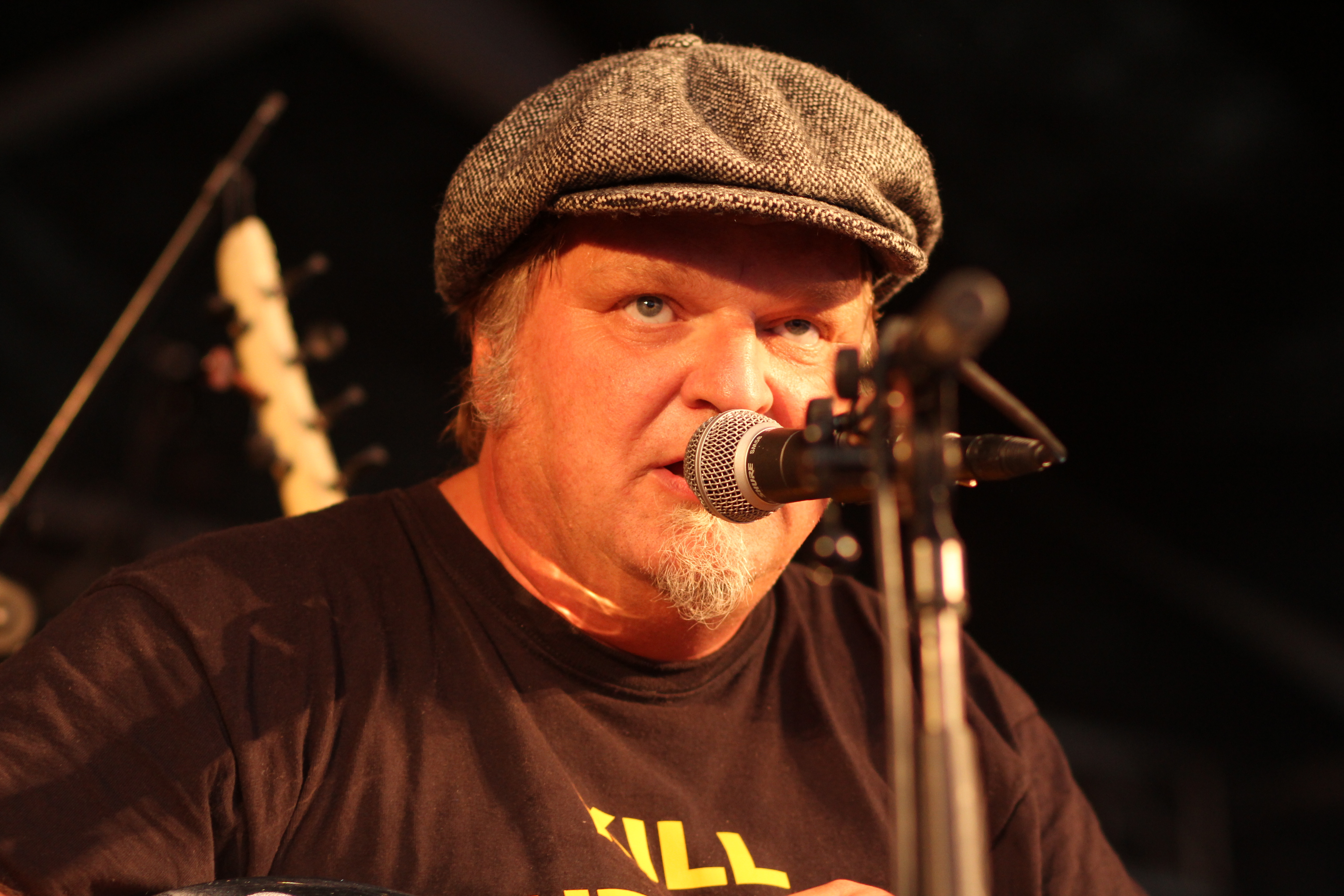

Background information
- Born: 12 February 1961 (age 65); Oslo, Norway
- Genres: Blues, pop, rock
- Occupation: Singer
- Instrument: Guitar
- Years active: 1990s–present
- Label: Kirkelig Kulturverksted
- Website: knutreiersrud.no

Knut Reiersrud (born 12 February 1961) is a Norwegian blues guitarist. His work also incorporates elements of Norwegian traditional music and African music. Reiersrud has recorded and played with David Lindley, the Blind Boys Of Alabama, Rickie Lee Jones, Nina Hagen and Swedish blues musician Sven Zetterberg. He has also numerous collaborations with Middle East performers like Rim Banna and Mahsa Vahdat. He lives in Oslo. He has collaborated extensively with the Norwegian organist Iver Kleive. He is lead guitarist and one of the original members of Cloudberry Cream.

== Career ==
Reiersrud also plays the harmonica, mandolin, langeleik, oud, and Turkish saz, he has composed music for four Norwegian movies, and together with Iver Kleive, took part in the opening ceremony of the '94 Olympic Winter Games.

In 2008 Reiersrud established his own festival «Trestock» at Nesodden, where a superteam of Norwegian musicians contributed. Among the artists can be mentioned Odd Nordstoga, Valkyrien Allstars and Reiersrud with his own Knut Reiersrud Band, and in collaboration with organist Iver Kleive. Upcoming artists, exciting for the younger audience, include Jarle Bernhoft (ex «Span») with his new project; the band «Lester», composed of Nikolai Eilertsen (ex BigBang) and David Wallumrød; and the indie band «Maika». Other names include The Grand; Amund Maarud's rock band, Spellemannprisen nominated Hemisfair; the girls who play lively frantic noise in Katzenjammer; the Rockabilly girls in Lucky Lips; the country artist Ivar Thomas; the Nesodden heroes «Foggy Boys» and «Midnight Special»; the traditional music trio «Vrang»; and «Drøbak Bluesband».

Reiersrud has for many years been host of the NRK radio program, Blues Asylet, together with Knut Borge. The program is meant to be a playground and a respite for blues and blues-friends of all shades. In 2004, Krissy Matthews undertook a radio session with Reiersrud for Blues Asylet on NRK P2.

== Honors ==
- 1991: Spellemannprisen for the album Blå koral
- 1992: Gammleng-prisen in the class Studio
- 1995: Notodden Bluesfestivalpris
- 2004: Spellemannprisen for Pretty Ugly
- 2006: Danish Grammy for the tune "Nåde Over Nåde"

== Discography ==
=== Solo albums ===
- 1993 - Tramp (Kirkelig Kulturverksted), released in the U.S. in 1994 under the title Footwork
- 1995 - Klapp (Kirkelig Kulturverksted)
- 1998 - Soul of a Man (Kirkelig Kulturverksted)
- 1999 - Sub (Kirkelig Kulturverksted)
- 2001 - Sweet Showers of Rain (Kirkelig Kulturverksted)
- 2004 - Pretty Ugly (Kirkelig Kulturverksted)
- 2009 - Gitar (Big Dipper Records)
- 2013 - Aftonblues (Bluestown Records)
- 2015 - Tears Of The World (ACT Music), with Mighty Sam McClain
- 2018 - Heat (Jazzland Recordings)

=== Collaborative works ===
- 1982 - Rooster Blues (Hot Club Records), with «The Four Roosters»
- 1993 - Roots To Scandinavian Blues (Hot Club Records), with Nappy Brown
- 1991 - Blå koral (Kirkelig Kulturverksted), with Iver Kleive
- 1996 - Himmelskip (Kirkelig Kulturverksted), with Iver Kleive
- 2000 - Den Signede Dag (Kirkelig Kulturverksted), with Iver Kleive & Povl Dissing
- 2000 - 4G (Curling Legs), guitar album with Frode Alnæs, Knut Værnes & Bjørn Klakegg
- 2006 - Nåde For Nåde (Kirkelig Kulturverksted), with Iver Kleive
- 2011 - One Drop Is Plenty (Kirkelig Kulturverksted), with Mighty Sam McClain
- 2012 - Infinite Gratitude, with Trondheim Soloists
- 2013 - Som Den Gylne Sol, with Iver Kleive and Povl Dissing
- 2014 - Blues Detour, with Eric Bibb and Ale Moeller
- 2015 - Trail of Souls, with Solveig Slettahjell and In the Country
- 2019 - Flying like Eagles (ACT), feat. Knut Reiersrud, Phil Donkin and Jim Black

Awards
Preceded by No Open class award	Recipient of the Open class Spellemannprisen; 1991	Succeeded by Ole Edvard Antonsen
Preceded by Olav Dale, Terje Methi & Bent Wiedswang	Recipient of the Studio Gammleng-prisen; 1992	Succeeded by Edvard Askeland, Karl Johan Helgesen & Ida Lind
Preceded by Vidar Busk	Recipient of the Blues/country Spellemannprisen; 2004	Succeeded by Award split into two classes
