= The Edge of Christmas =

Compilation album by Various artists
- Released: August 15, 1995
- Genre: Christmas, alternative rock, new wave
- Label: Oglio

Professional ratings
Review scores
Source	Rating
AllMusic	3/5 stars

The Edge of Christmas is a compilation album released in 1995 by Oglio Records. It features Christmas songs with a general new wave/rock theme.

== Track listing ==
1. "Thank God It's Christmas" – Queen
2. "Please Come Home for Christmas" – Pat Benatar
3. "2000 Miles" – The Pretenders
4. "December Will Be Magic Again" – Kate Bush
5. "Peace on Earth/Little Drummer Boy" – David Bowie and Bing Crosby
6. "Winter Wonderland" – Cocteau Twins
7. "Rudolph the Red-Nosed Reindeer" – The Smithereens
8. "Run Run Rudolph" – Dave Edmunds
9. "Christmas is Coming" – The Payolas
10. "Fairytale of New York" – The Pogues
11. "Merry Christmas (I Don't Want to Fight)" – The Ramones
12. "Christmas Wrapping" – The Waitresses
