= Prayers & Observations =

Studio album by Torun Eriksen
- Released: February 17, 2006
- Genre: Jazz
- Length: 45:09
- Label: Jazzland
- Producer: Bugge Wesseltoft

Torun Eriksen chronology
Glittercard (2003)	Prayers & Observations (2006)

Prayers & Observations (released 2006 by the label Jazzland 2006) is the second album by jazz composer and vocalist Torun Eriksen. In ten new songs written by Eriksen, she is once again joined by her loyal musicians. As her first release Glittercard (Jazzland 2003) was produced by Bugge Wesseltoft, he again applies his trademark production to this album.

== Musicians ==
- Kjetil Dalland (bass)
- Torstein Lofthus (drums)
- David Wallumrød (keyboards)
- Frøydis Grorud (saxophone and flute)

== Track listing ==
1. «Joy» (4:05)
2. «My Boys» (4:26)
3. «Way To Go» (4:33)
4. «Song Of Sadness» (3:49)
5. «Featuring Youth» (5:24)
6. «The Sky From Where I Live» (5:12)
7. «Stories» (4:39)
8. «This Is Real» (4:44)
9. «Tired» (4:46)
10. «Saviour» (3:27)

== Credits ==
- Producer – Bugge Wesseltoft
- Recorded By, Mixed By – Andy Mytteis, Bugge Wesseltoft

== Notes ==
- Recorded at Bugges Room Spring & Fall 2005
- P 2005 Jazzland Recordings c 2005 Universal Music Norway
- Total playing time: 45:09
