= Vidar Busk =

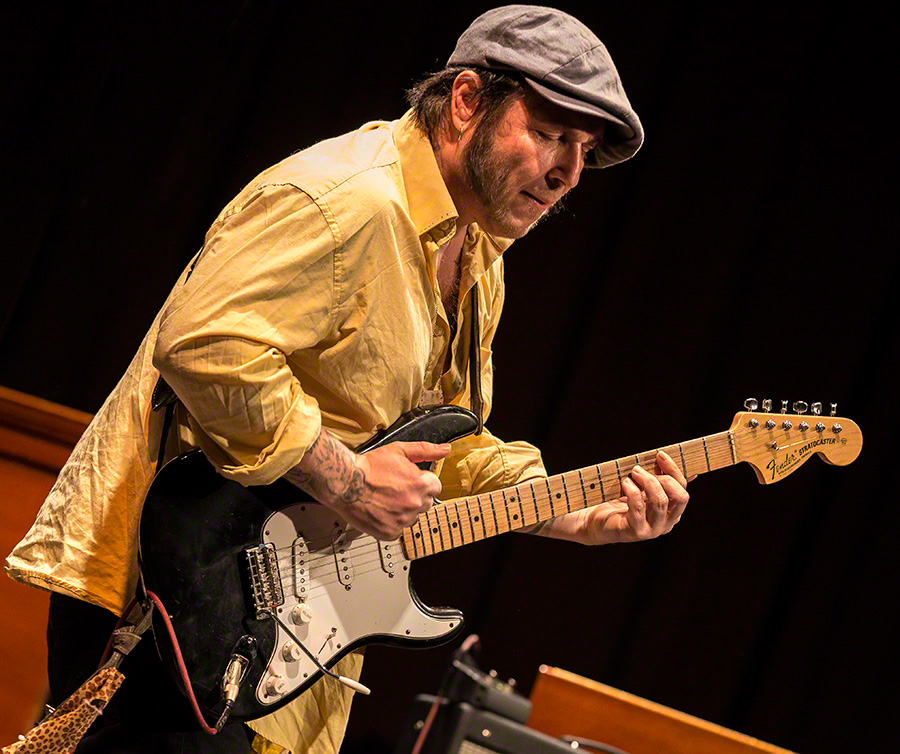
- Vidar Busk at a concert at Cosmopolite in Oslo in April 2016

Background information
- Born: 19 May 1970 (age 55); Langesund
- Origin: Norway
- Genres: Blues, soul
- Occupations: Musician, composer
- Instruments: Guitar, vocals
- Website: vidarbusk.no

Vidar Busk (born 19 May 1970 in Langesund, Norway) is a Norwegian guitarist, vocalist, composer and record producer within genres blues and soul.

== Career ==
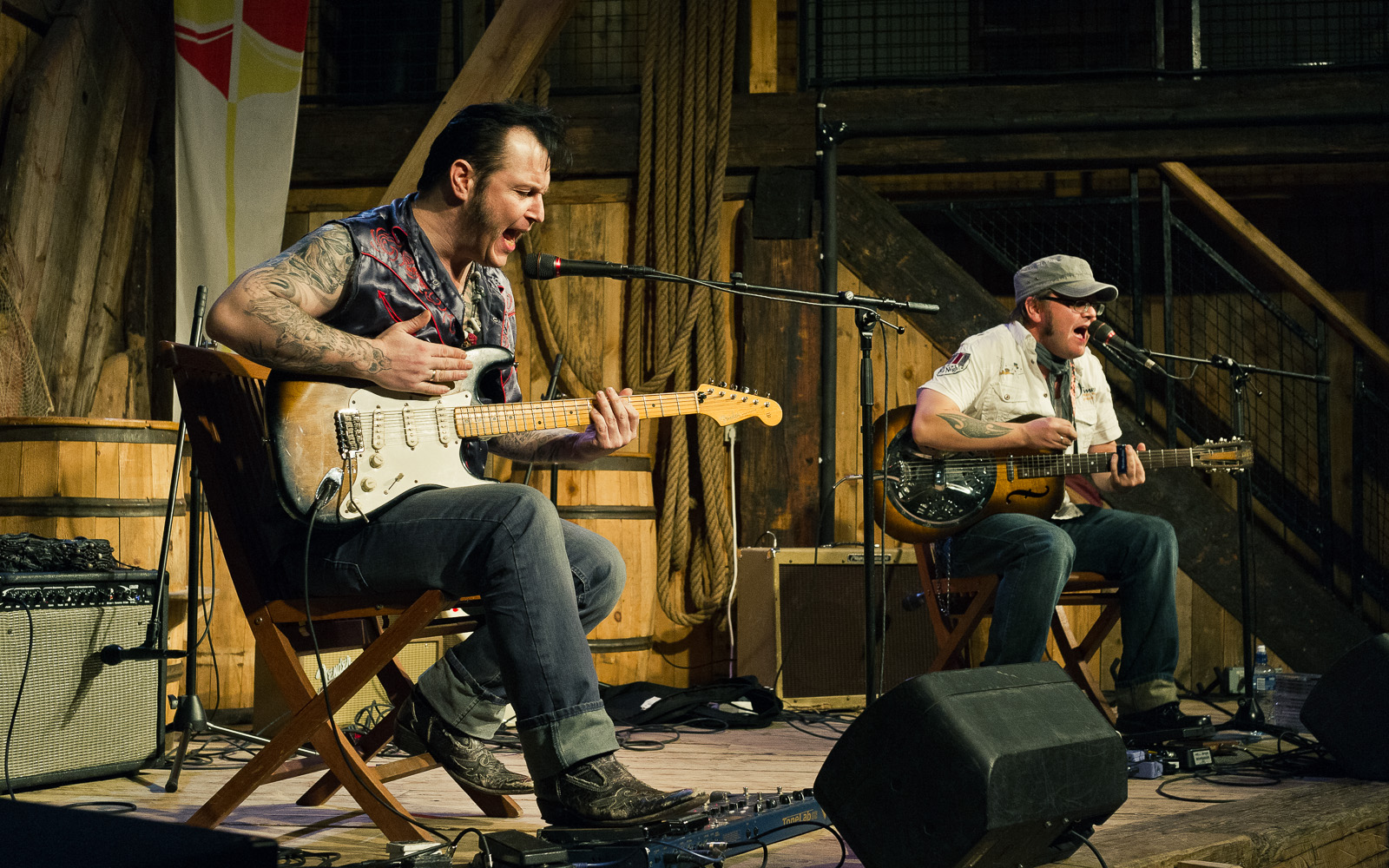
Busk – Blues i fjæra 2010.

Busk grew up in Langesund, but went to the U.S. at age 15 to play with the American blues artist Rock Bottom. He toured the U.S. for several years before returning to Norway in 1990. He was awarded Smugetprisen in 1994. Later he was awarded Spellemannprisen on two different occasions, as Artist of the Year in 1998 and in the blues/country class in 2003.

Busk played at Moldejazz 2011, 16 years after the formation of His True Believers.

== Honors ==
- Smugetprisen 1994
- Bluesprisen 1997, from The Norwegian Blues Union
- Spellemannprisen 1998, as This year's artist
- Spellemannprisen 2003, in the class Blues/country

== Discography ==
=== Vidar Busk and His True Believers ===
- Stompin Our Feet With Joy (1997) (nyutgitt i 2011)
- I Came Here To Rock (1998)
- Atomic Swing (1999)
- Civilized Life (2021)

=== Vidar Busk ===
- Venus Texas (2001)
- Love Buzz (2003)
- Starfish (2005)

=== Vidar Busk and The Voo Doodz ===
- Jookbox Charade (2007)

=== Vidar Busk and His Bubble of Trouble ===
- Troublecaster (2011)

=== Vidar Busk, Daniel Eriksen & Stig Sjostrom ===
- Hustle & Flow (2019)

Awards
Preceded by Espen Lind	Recipient of the Artist of the year Spellemannprisen; 1998	Succeeded by Lene Marlin
Preceded by Bjørn Berge	Recipient of the Blues Spellemannprisen; 2003	Succeeded by Knut Reiersrud
