= Frontside Rock'n'Roll =

Studio album by BigBang
- Released: 2002
- Recorded: December 2001, January 2002
- Studio: GrandSport Studio
- Genre: Rock
- Length: 40:58
- Label: Warner Music Group
- Producers: Øystein Greni; Nikolai Eilertsen (Co-producer); Nils B. Kval (Co-producer)

BigBang chronology
Clouds Rolling By (2000)	Frontside Rock'n'Roll (2002)	Radio Radio TV Sleep (2003)

Professional ratings
Review scores
Source	Rating
Dagbladet	4/6 stars
Aftenposten	5/6 stars

Frontside Rock'n'Roll is the fourth album by the Norwegian rock band BigBang, released in 2002.

== Overview ==
Frontside Rock'n'Roll is the first full-length Bigbang album to be released outside of Norway. Warner Music Germany would also re-release their previous album Clouds Rolling By in the country.

Øystein Greni wrote the song "Frontside Rock 'n' Roll" as a tribute to two of his skater friends, who had died the same year. Frontside Rock 'n' Roll is also the name of a skateboard trick, a sport which Greni is a former European champion of. The song lyrics reference various skateboard tricks.

"Fire & Oil" was co-written with Nikolai Eilertsen and documents the 11th of September 2001 events from the point of view of a kamikaze pilot. "Earphones" is an homage to Ray Charles. "One of a Kind" is dedicated to his friend the Norwegian film director Joachim Trier, while "Mercedes" is dedicated to 'M.E.O.' (Maria Eva Orieta), a performer from Argentina and Greni's then-fiancée.

== Track listing ==
All tracks are written by Øystein Greni, except where noted.

No.	Title	Writer(s)	Length
1.	"One of a Kind"		4:36
2.	"Fire and Oil"	Nikolai Eilertsen; Øystein Greni	5:12
3.	"Heaven and Stars Above"		4:47
4.	"Spiritual Heart Surgery"		2:42
5.	"Liquid Gold"		3:33
6.	"Mercedes"		3:52
7.	"Where the World Comes to an End"		4:30
8.	"Earphones"		3:19
9.	"The Elephant Man"		3:14
10.	"Frontside Rock'n'Roll"		5:13

== Personnel ==
Bigbang

- Øystein Greni – lead vocals, guitars, piano, mandolin, horns, drums, percussion, producer
- Nikolai Eilertsen – bass, organ, piano, harmonica, horns, percussion, backing vocals, co-producer
- Olaf Olsen – drums, percussion

Additional personnel

- Nils B. Kvam – co-producer
- Stig Morten Sørheim – engineer
- Morten Lund – mastering
- Stig Morten Sørheim – percussion, backing vocals
- Karim Sayed – backing vocals
- Martin Windstad – congas (track 1)
- Lars Håvard Haugen – lead guitar (track 3)
- Christian Engfelt – backing vocals (track 3)
- Jon Riise – backing vocals (track 3)
- Sølvguttene – choir (track 7)
- Sindre E. Røysland – backing vocals (track 8)
- Åshild Stensrud – backing vocals (track 8)
- Åste Sem – backing vocals (track 8)
- Asgeir Innerdal – skateboard noise (track 10)
- Amelie Poulain – photography
- Jan Inge Janbu – photography
- Dimitri Kayiambakis – artwork
- Millimeter – artwork
