= Radio Radio TV Sleep =

Live album by BigBang
- Released: 25 August 2003
- Recorded: June 2002; February 2003
- Genre: Rock music
- Length: 104:12
- Label: Warner Music
- Producer: Øystein Greni

BigBang chronology
| Frontside Rock'n'Roll (2002) | Radio Radio TV Sleep (2003) | Poetic Terrorism (2005) |

Professional ratings
Review scores
| Source | Rating |
|---|---|
| Dagbladet | 5/6 stars |

Radio Radio TV Sleep is a live album by the Norwegian rock band BigBang, which was released in 2003. The album was recorded during Bigbang's tour of the same name in February 2003, with the exception of "Better Than Before", recorded at Ullevål Stadion, Oslo, in June 2002.

== Overview ==
The album contains two discs, one with recordings from some of their acoustic concerts, and the other a collection of live electric tracks. Two different releases were made, a regular one and a digipack limited edition. "Can't Find My Way Home" is Øystein Greni's favourite song and was written in the 1960s by Steve Winwood of the group Blind Faith.

The other non-LP electric tracks are "Wrong Number" (Girl In Oslo EP '00) and "Better Than Before" (Girl In Oslo Europe EP '01). Acoustic tracks "Old People" (New Glow EP '00) and "Smiling For" (Smiling For EP '01) are EP-only numbers. Remaining songs "Lights Go Out" and "Cry Right" were concert tunes never released before.

Radio Radio TV Sleep sold to platinum and became until then the most successful live album ever released in Norway. The video version of the album, known as Radio Radio TV Sleep DVD, features six tracks taken from each disc plus bonus material such as music videos and TV live, including a cover of Jimi Hendrix' Purple Haze which Øystein Greni played on Norwegian television at the age of twelve.

The album title refers to a cheatcode that could be applied onto hotel room TV remote controls to access pay-television.

== Track listing ==
All tracks are written by Øystein Greni, except where noted.

Disc 1 (Electric disc)
| No. | Title | Writer(s) | Venue | Length |
|---|---|---|---|---|
| 1. | "Where the World Comes to an End" | | Folken, Stavanger | 5:10 |
| 2. | "Heaven and Stars Above" | | Rockefeller, Oslo | 5:32 |
| 3. | "Wild Bird" | | Meieriet, Sogndal | 4:49 |
| 4. | "Sing and Dance" | | Samfundet, Trondheim | 4:17 |
| 5. | "To the Mountains" | | Samfundet, Trondheim | 5:20 |
| 6. | "Elephant Man" | | Rockefeller, Oslo | 3:37 |
| 7. | "Wrong Number" | | Samfundet, Trondheim | 4:00 |
| 8. | "Make a Circle" | | Hulen, Bergen | 3:33 |
| 9. | "Something Special" | | Hulen, Bergen | 4:22 |
| 10. | "Girl in Oslo" | | Rockefeller, Oslo | 6:37 |
| 11. | "Long Distance Man" | Eigil Berg; Øystein Greni | Rockefeller, Oslo | 5:21 |
| 12. | "Better Than Before" | | Ullevål Stadion, Oslo | 6:23 |
| 13. | "How Do You Do?" | | Folken, Stavanger | 3:50 |
| Total length: | | | | 62:51 |

All tracks are written by Øystein Greni, except where noted.

Disc 2 (acoustic disc)
| No. | Title | Writer(s) | Venue | Length |
|---|---|---|---|---|
| 1. | "Frontside Rock'n'Roll" | | Hulen, Bergen | 3:52 |
| 2. | "Long Distance Man" (With Taran Greni) | Eigil Berg; Øystein Greni | John Dee, Oslo | 4:20 |
| 3. | "Right Beside You" | | Samfundet, Trondheim | 3:42 |
| 4. | "Old People" | | John Dee, Oslo | 4:31 |
| 5. | "Street Parade" | | Samfundet, Trondheim | 3:04 |
| 6. | "Lights Go Out" (With Taran Greni) | | John Dee, Oslo | 4:01 |
| 7. | "Smiling For" | | John Dee, Oslo | 3:37 |
| 8. | "Cry Right" (With Erik Tresselt) | | John Dee, Oslo | 1:59 |
| 9. | "Summer Rain" | | John Dee, Oslo | 3:28 |
| 10. | "Clouds Rolling By" | | Hulen, Bergen | 4:55 |
| 11. | "Can't Find My Way Home" (Blind Faith cover) | Steve Winwood | Hulen, Bergen | 3:52 |
| Total length: | | | | 41:21 |

== Personnel ==
Bigbang

- Øystein Greni – lead vocals, guitars, piano, mandolin, woodwinds, drums, percussion
- Nikolai Eilertsen – bass, organ, piano, harmonica, brass, percussion, vocals
- Olaf Olsen – drums, percussion

Additional personnel

- Kai Andersen – engineer
- Stig Morten Sørheim – engineer
- Helge Sten – mixer (track 1-2, 1-6, 1-7, 1-11, 2-2 to 2-4, 2-6 to 2-9)
- Michael Ilbert – mixer (track 1-1, 1-3 to 1-5, 1-8 to 1-10, 1-12, 1-13, 2-1, 2-10, 2-11)
- Vlado Meller – mastering
- Steve Kadison – mastering (assistant)
- Taran Greni – vocals (track 2-2, 2-6)
- Erik Tresselt – vocals (track 2-8)
- Karim Sayed – ensemble (track 10)
- Kristian Syvertsen – ensemble (track 10)
- Svein Greni – ensemble (track 10)
- Søren Brandt – ensemble (track 10)
- Tarjei Grimsby – ensemble (track 10)
- Thor Sigbjørn Greni – ensemble (track 10)
- Øystein Bjørk – ensemble (track 10)
- Anders Wolfgang Aasebøe – crew
- Christian Jajauhm Engfeldt – crew
- Freddie Freeloader Eilertsen – crew
- Kristian Sterkenils Syvertsen – crew
- Terje Disko Olsen – crew
- Nils Vik – photography, spiritual guidance
- Dimitri&Bengt – design
- Terje Pedersen – A&R
