= Oglio Records =

American record company

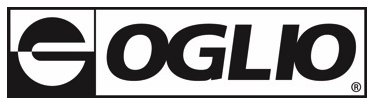
- Parent company: Oglio Entertainment
- Founded: 1993
- Founder: Carl Caprioglio
- Distributor: INgrooves
- Genre: Rock, new wave
- Country of origin: U.S.
- Official website: www.oglio.com

Oglio Records is an American record company started in 1993 by Carl Caprioglio. The label issues compilations of rare 1980s modern rock and new wave songs, many previously unreleased on CD. In addition to releasing new material by artists such as BigBang, Nerf Herder and Wesley Willis, the label has also re-released albums by artists such as Brian Wilson and Barnes & Barnes. Oglio Entertainment has also released stand-up comedy CDs by the likes of Jackie Martling and George Lopez.

== History ==
The founder of Oglio Records, Carl Caprioglio, has stated that as a youth he was influenced by both the rock playing on Los Angeles radio stations KMET and KLOS and the modern rock of KROQ. He also listened heavily to new wave music. In 1984 he and a friend began to disc jockey at dances and parties in California, eventually forming a DJ business with a variety of other DJs. After he filled in for a friend at a gig with the KROQ DJ, Caprioglio's business began supplying light sound equipment to KROQ, as well as Power 106.

In 1992 Caprioglio released his first compilation album, which was titled Flashback! New Wave Classics. In 1993 he left his DJ business to found Oglio Records, which quickly gained a reputation for compilations of rare 1980s modern rock releases. At the time music reissues on CD were a burgeoning field, and Oglio Records successfully competed with larger labels. The label also began releasing re-issues of complete albums by bands such as King, Sparks, the Red Rockers, and Wire Train. Other compilations included Flashback Cafe (1994), Punk University Vol. 2 (1995), and Straight Outta Cleveland (1995). In 1995 the label released the compilation The Edge of Christmas, which included Christmas songs by Pat Benatar, The Pretenders, David Bowie and Bing Crosby, The Ramones, The Pogues and others. Oglio Records quickly began releasing original albums as well, such as the 1996 album Rock 'N' Roll Will Never Die by Wesley Willis. In 1998 Oglio Entertainment was included by Inc. Magazine as one of the 500 fastest growing companies in America. They have also reissued the catalog for the classic Television's Greatest Hits compilation series.

== Overview ==
Oglio Records is now an imprint of Oglio Entertainment, which is headquartered in Las Vegas, Nevada. Oglio Entertainment has different divisions for comedy, rap, rock, kids, holiday, and video, with Oglio Records handling rock and reissues. The sub-division Glue Factory Records handles alternative rock, and DMAFT Records handles rap and hip-hop. The label continues to be known for preserving and re-issuing new wave music of that late 1970s and early 1980s, especially tracks which had previously been unavailable on CD. It distributes in the United States and Canada through INgrooves. The label also works with Planetworks/MVD.

== Artists ==
=== Current ===
- Beatallica
- Andy Dick
- Cyndi Lauper
- Jamie James
- Jean-Jacques Perrey
- Dana Countryman
- Margo Guryan
- MC Lars
- Naked Eyes
- Nerf Herder
- Palmdale
- Parry Gripp
- Roger Joseph Manning, Jr.
- Wisely

=== Former ===
- 20/20
- The Arrogant Worms
- Big Daddy
- Boo-Yaa T.R.I.B.E.
- Jackie Martling
- The Leftovers
- The Motels
- The Muffs
- The Shocker
- Shonen Knife
- Wesley Willis

== Release history ==
Year	No.	Artist	Title
1992	S2157944	Various	Flashback! New Wave Classics
1994	S2117513	Various	Richard Blade's Flashback Favorites Vol. 4
1994	OGL81565	Killer Pussy	Bikini Wax
1994	OGL81565	Various	The Obscurity File
1994	OGL81566	Freur	Doot-Doot
1994	OGL81567	King	Steps in Time
1994	OGL81568	Various	Richard Blade's Flashback Favorites Vol. 5
1994	OGL81569	Various	Richard Blade's Flashback Favorites Vol. 6
1995	OGL81572	Various	Punk University Vol. 2
1995	OGL81573	Various	Straight Outta Cleveland
1994	OGL81574	Various	Flashback Cafe Vol. 1
1995	OGL81575	Various	Flashback Cafe Vol. 2
1995	OGL81576	Red Rockers	"Good as Gold/Schizophrenic Circus"
1995	OGL81577	Wire Train	In A Chamber / Between Two Words
1995	OGL81581	20/20	"20/20 / Look Out!"
1995	OGL81583	Various	Hit That Perfect Beat! Vol. 1
1995	OGL81584	Various	Hit That Perfect Beat! Vol. 2
1995	OGL81585	Various (Pat Benatar, The Pretenders, David Bowie and Bing Crosby, The Ramones, The Pogues, etc.)	The Edge of Christmas
1995	OGL89100	20/20	4 Day Tornado
1995	OGL85001	David Bowie and Bing Crosby	"Peace on Earth/Little Drummer Boy"
1996	OGL81586	Wesley Willis	Rock 'N' Roll Will Never Die
1997	OGL81588	Men Without Hats	Rhythm of Youth / Folk of the 80s (Part III)
1998	OGL81594	Peter Godwin	Images of Heaven: the Best of Peter Godwin
1997	OGL81595	Barnes and Barnes	Spazchow
1997	OGL89103	Various (Motörhead, Sublime, etc.)	Tromeo and Juliet soundtrack
	OGL89105	Unknown	Sex-O-Rama
1998	OGL8502	Peter Godwin and Sasha	Rendezvous
1998	OGL89107	Various	Psycho Sisters soundtrack
1998	OGL89108	Unknown	Sex-O-Rama 2
1998	OGL89109	Sparks	Plagiarism
1998	OGL85003	Sparks	No. 1 in Heaven
1998	OGL81600	Sparks	Terminal Jive
1998	OGL81601	Sparks	Whomp That Sucker
1998	OGL81602	Sparks	Angst in My Pants
1998	OGL81603	Sparks	In Outer Space
1998	OGL81604	Sparks	Pulling Rabbits Out of a Hat
1999	OGL81605	Sparks	12" Mixes
1999	OGL89110	Evil Genius Orchestra	Cocktails from the Cantina (Star Wars covers in lounge style)
2001	OGL84001	Sparks	Live in London
2000	OGL81606	Barnes and Barnes	Yeah: The Essential Barnes and Barnes
2005	OGL81611	Shonen Knife	712
2000	OGL82008	Margo Guryan	Take a Picture
2000	OGL89119	Sparks	Balls
2000	OGL89121	Richard Cheese	Lounge Against the Machine
2001	OGL82012	Brian Wilson	Live at the Roxy Theatre
2001	OGL82013	Margo Guryan	25 Demos
2001	OGL89124	George Lopez	Right Now Right Now
2002	OGL89128	Jaymz Bee and the Deep Lounge Coalition	Sub Urban
2002	OGL89129	Dan Castellaneta	I Am Not Homer
2002	OGL82014	Anna Waronker	Anna
2002	OGL82015	Cyndi Lauper	Shine
2002	OGL82016	Redd Kross	Neurotica
2003	OGL82019	Cyndi Lauper	Shine (Remixes)
2003	OGL82024	Boo Yaa Tribe	West Koasta Nostra
	OGL82025	Red Peters	I Laughed, I Cried, I Fudged my Undies
	OGL82026	Red Peters	Ol' Blue Balls is Back
2004	OGL82029	The Muffs	Really Really Happy
2005	OGL82030	The Plimsouls	One Night in America – Live!
2006	OGL89138	Jean-Jacques Perrey and Dana Countryman	The Happy Electropop Music Machine!
2007	OGL82032	Naked Eyes	Fumbling With The Covers
2008	OGL89145	Nerf Herder	Nerf Herder IV
2008	OGL82035	BigBang	From Acid to Zen
2009	OGL82037	Bigband	Edendale
2010	OGL82040	Rob Schneider	Registered Offender
1998		Jackie Martling	Hot Dogs + Donuts
