= Waxed =

Studio album by BigBang
- Released: 1995
- Recorded: June 1995
- Studio: G.L. Studio; Rodeløkka Studios
- Genre: Rock music; funk rock; hardcore Hip Hop
- Length: 38:22
- Label: Grand Sport; Warner Music
- Producer: Bigbang; Børge Finnstad; Jørn Christensen

BigBang chronology
Waxed (1995)	Electric Psalmbook (1999)

Waxed is the debut album of the Norwegian rock band BigBang. It was first released in 1995 then reissued in 2002 by Warner Music.

== Overview ==
All tracks where recorded at G. L. Studio, with the exception of "Little Cloud", recorded at Rodeløkka Studios. "Elle Vogue" is a hidden instrumental track that appears after nine minutes and thirty-six seconds of silence following "Down There Again".

== Track listing ==
All tracks are written by Øystein Greni, except where noted.

No.	Title	Writer(s)	Length
1.	"Busride"		4:04
2.	"Limo Driver"		3:38
3.	"The Man"		2:38
4.	"Little Cloud"		4:48
5.	"Two O'Clock"		4:06
6.	"Tennis Club"		4:06
7.	"Marvin Dae"	Stein Gudmundsen	2:36
8.	"Rules Understood"	Thor S. Greni; Øystein Greni	2:44
9.	"Situations"		4:30
10.	"Usually"		3:17
11.	"Down There Again"	Erik Tresselt; T. S. Greni; Ø. Greni	2:55
12.	"Ellè Vouge" (Hidden track)		2:00
Total length:			38:22

== Personnel ==
Bigbang

- Øystein Greni – lead vocals, guitars, arrangements, mixing, mastering
- Erik Tresselt – bass, vocals, arrangements, mixing, mastering,
- Christer Engen – drums, vocals, arrangements, mixing, mastering

Additional personnel

- Børge Finnstad – producer, engineer, mixer (all tracks except "Little Cloud")
- Jørn Christensen – producer, recording engineer ("Little Cloud")
- Audun Strype – mastering
- Iver Olav Erstad – Organ ("Tennis Club")
- Aud Vikør – cover design
- Fin Serck Hanssen – photography
- Management – Grand Sport Management
