= Too Much Yang =

Studio album by BigBang
- Released: 19 March 2007 (Norway)
- Recorded: September and November 2006
- Studio: Grand Sport Studios; Capitol Studios
- Genre: Rock
- Length: 35:34
- Label: Grand Sport Records; Warner Music
- Producer: Øystein Greni

BigBang chronology
Poetic Terrorism (2005)	Too Much Yang (2007)	Something Special - The Best of Bigbang (2007)

Professional ratings
Review scores
Source	Rating
Dagbladet	5/6 stars
Verdens Gang	5/6 stars

Too Much Yang is the sixth studio album made by the Norwegian rock band BigBang. It was released in Norway on 19 March 2007 by Warner Music and Grand Sport Records. The album was received generally well by critics in Norway.

== Title and recording ==
The name, "Too Much Yang", comes from a Feng Shui book drummer Olaf Olsen bought in Los Angeles. Under a picture of an AmCar, the picture text stated: "an example of too much yang". Øystein Greni decided to use the phrase "Too Much Yang" for the title of the album. Most of the album was recorded at Greni's studio Grand Sport in Oslo, with the exception of the track "Hurricane Boy", which was recorded at Capitol Studios in Hollywood.

== Track listing ==
All tracks are written by Øystein Greni, except where noted

No.	Title	Writer(s)	Length
1.	"Too Much Yang"		3:17
2.	"Hurricane Boy"		2:33
3.	"I Don't Wanna"		3:21
4.	"L.A. Song"	Øystein Greni; Maria Orieta	3:46
5.	"My First Time"		3:22
6.	"The Third Act"	Øystein Greni; Martin Hagfors	2:51
7.	"All The Time"		2:38
8.	"A Thousand Times Over"	Øystein Greni; Martin Hagfors	3:49
9.	"Early December"		3:02
10.	"We Belong Together"		2:47
11.	"Angelina"	Øystein Greni; Martin Hagfors	4:03
Total length:			35:34

== Personnel ==
Bigbang

- Øystein Greni – vocals, guitar
- Lasse Weeden – bass
- Olaf Olsen – drums

Additional personnel

- Nils B. Kvam – producer (additional vocals)
- David Larring – engineer, bass (track 1), piano (track 6)
- Charles Paakari – engineer (track 2)
- Michael Ilbert – mixer
- Rich Veltrop – mixer (track 2 and 9)
- Sylvia Massy Shivy – mixer (track 2 and 9)
- Christian Engfelt – mixer (track 8)
- Ulf Holand – mixer (track 11)
- Vlado Meller – mastering
- Maria Orieta – vocals (track 4)
- Erik Tresselt – vocals (track 7 and 10)
- Nikolai Eilertsen – vocals (track 10)
- Christian Engfelt – bass (track 2)
- Øyvind Storli Hoel – bass (track 7)
- Lars H. Haugen – guitar (track 5)
- Martin Winstad – congas (track 3)
- David Wallumrød – piano (track 3)
- Janne Solberg – background vocals (track 3)
- Sindre Røyland – background vocals (track 3)
- Tone Heidi Borhaug – background vocals (track 3)
- Bjørn Asper – horns (on track 3 and 10)
- Svein Greni – horns (on track 3 and 10)
- Tarjei Grimsby – horns (on track 3 and 10)
- Kaja Fjellberg Pettersen – cello (track 8)
- Nikolai Matthews – double bass (track 8)
