= Electric Psalmbook =

Studio album by BigBang
- Released: February 1999
- Recorded: August and December 1998
- Studio: Athletic Sound; Oslo Lyd
- Genre: Rock music
- Length: 48:16
- Label: Grand Sport, Warner Music
- Producer: Nils B. Kvam; Lars Lundevall (Note: Producer on track 12)

BigBang chronology
Waxed (1995)	Electric Psalmbook (1999)	Clouds Rolling By (2000)

Professional ratings
Review scores
Source	Rating
Dagbladet	5/6 stars

Electric Psalmbook is the second album by the Norwegian rock band BigBang, released in 1999. The album was produced by Nils B. Kvam and recorded at Athletic Sound in August 1998, with the exception of the song "Wild Bird", which was recorded at Oslo Lyd in December of that year.

== Overview ==
For the Warner Music release of the album, "Volume or Tone" and "Wild Bird (live)" were added as bonus tracks. The former being produced by Lars Lundevall and recorded at Musikkloftet in September 1996, while the latter was recorded at Norwegian Wood in 1999 by NRK Musikkteknikk. The original album released through Grand Sport Records ends after the title track.

"Long Distance Man" is Øystein Greni's English adaptation of the Undertakers Circus song "Nettenes Prinsesse" (Princess of the Night). The original song was available in the Ragnarock LP released in February 1973 by Polydor. Live versions of the track with Øystein Greni's lyrics were later released on the Smiling For 2001 EP (live at Rockefeller '01), on the 2003 live album Radio Radio TV Sleep and a special duet version with Greni's sister, Taran Greni, was included in the Radio Radio TV Sleep video album. An anterior version of "How Do You Do" was released on the 1997 How Do You Do? / Something Better limited print vinyl single.

== Track listing ==
All tracks are written by Øystein Greni, except where noted.

No.	Title	Writer(s)	Length
1.	"Wild Bird"		3:12
2.	"Something Special"		4:12
3.	"Still Have The Time"		4:28
4.	"So In Love"		3:03
5.	"How Do You Do"		3:25
6.	"In Love With You"		3:25
7.	"Major Pronin"		2:19
8.	"Make A Circle"		3:34
9.	"Reflection"		3:50
10.	"Long Distance Man" (Undertakers Circus cover)	Eigil Berg	4:33
11.	"Electric Psalmbook"		3:50
Total length:			48:16

Bonus tracks
No.	Title	Length
12.	"Volume Or Tone"	3:46
13.	"Wild Bird" (Live)	4:41
Total length:		56:43

== Personnel ==
Bigbang

- Øystein Greni – lead vocals, guitars, arrangements
- Erik Tresselt – bass, backing vocals, arrangements
- Kristian Syvertsen – drums, backing vocals, arrangements

Additional personnel

- Nils B. Kvam – producer, photography
- Lars Lundevall – producer (track 12)
- Kai Andersen – engineer
- Vidar Lunden – engineer (track 12)
- Arne Dypevik – engineer (track 13)
- Øystein Halvorsen – engineer (track 13)
- Stig Morten Sørheim – mixing (track 13)
- Ola Johansen – mastering
- Martin Horntveth – drums, percussion, accordion (track 13), backing vocals (all tracks except 1 and 11)
- Christer Engen – drums, percussion (track 1), backing vocals (tracks 4 and 5)
- Knut Schreiner – lead guitar (track 10)
- Vegar Bakke – organ (track 4)
- Alex Kayiambakis – cover photography
- Rob Erickson – photography
- Jan Inge Janbu – artwork
- Dimitri "D.F.O" Kayiambakis – artwork, layout
