= Bigbang (Norwegian band) =

Norwegian rock band

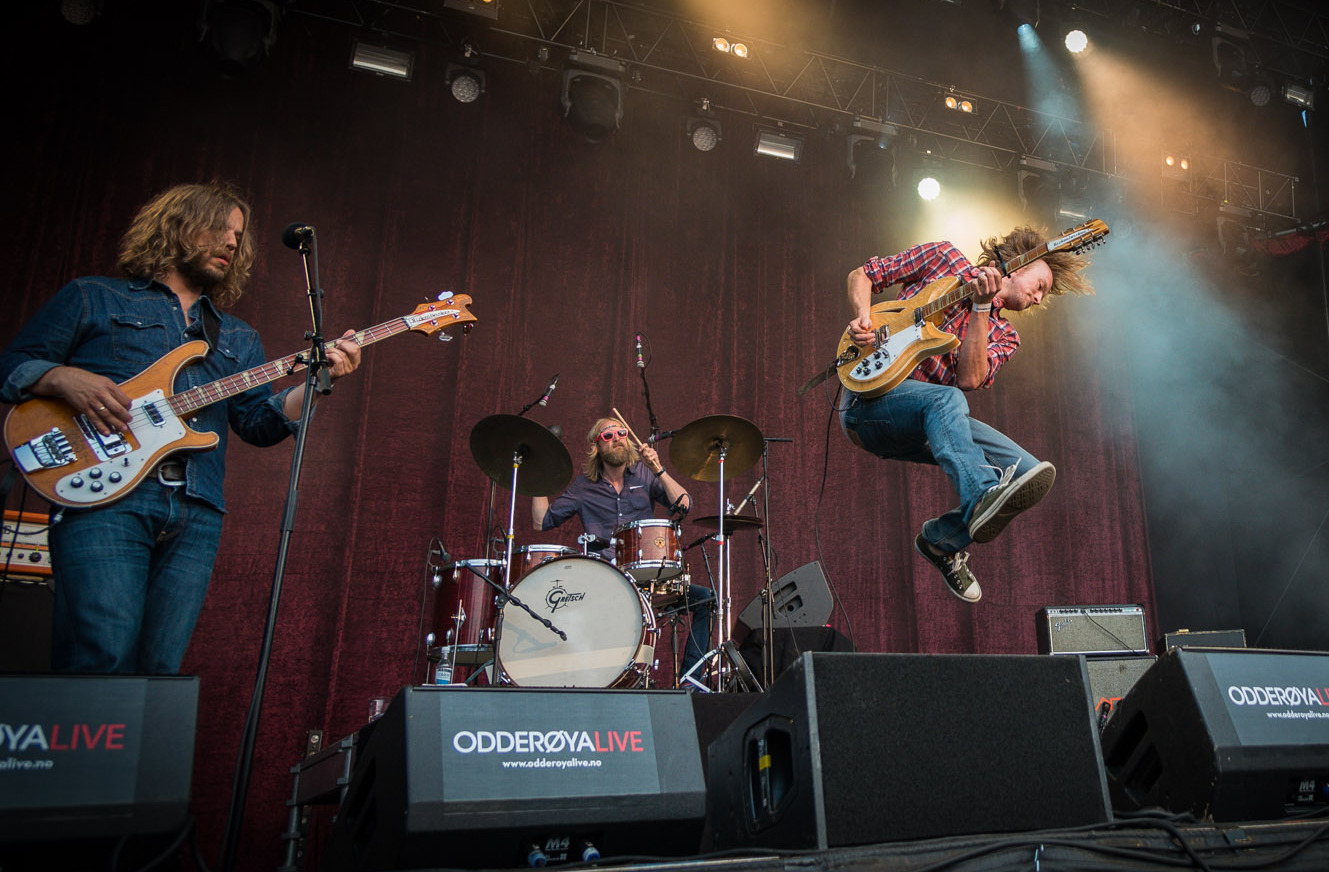
- Bigbang performing live in 2013. From left to right: Nikolai Eilertsen, Olaf Olsen and Øystein Greni.

Background information
- Origin: Oslo, Norway
- Genres: Rock; rock and roll; blues rock; indie rock
- Years active: 1992–present
- Labels: Grand Sport; Warner Music; Oglio
- Members: Øystein Greni; Olaf Olsen; Nikolai Eilertsen
- Past members: Christer Engen; Øyvind Storli Hoel; Karim Sayed; Stig Morten Sørheim; Kristian Syvertsen; Martin Horntveth; Erik Tresselt; Lasse Weeden
- Website: Official website

Bigbang (also styled BigBang, bigbang or BIGBANG) is a Norwegian rock band. Formed in 1992, the band is led by frontman and chief songwriter Øystein Greni. Over the years, the band's lineup has changed several times while remaining a trio and with Greni as the only constant member.

Bigbang has been described as "Norway's best live band", with their album Radio Radio TV Sleep holding the distinction of being the best selling live album released in Norway. The band has released eleven studio albums, one live album and two compilation albums.

== History ==
Bigbang was formed in 1992 by guitarist and vocalist Øystein Greni and drummer Christer Engen while they were in high school. Among their influences were American punk and hardcore bands, and classic rock from the 1960s, 70s and 80s, while they also had parents active in the music business. Bassist Erik Tresselt completed the band's first lineup and the trio went on a month-long tour of the United States in 1993, and released their first album Waxed in 1995 on their own independent record label, Grand Sport.

Drummer Engen left the band to join Turbonegro in 1997, and was replaced by Martin Horntveth, previously with Jaga Jazzist. They released the single "How Do You Do", and remained together until January 1999 when Horntveth returned to Jaga Jazzist, to be replaced by Kristian Syvertsen. Syvertsen remained with the band until April of that year when he left and was replaced by Olaf Olsen. Bassist Tresselt left the band in August 1999 and was succeeded by Nikolai Eilertsen.

Greni sold his Vespa to pay the final installment to finance the production of Electric Psalmbook recorded during 1998 in Athletic Sound Studio in Halden, and released on the own label Grand Sport in March 1999. The band's breakthrough came about following a highly successful 1999 by:Larm concert in Stavanger, when suddenly several record companies demonstrated great interest in signing them. The band signed with Warner Music in 1999, and immediately re-released Electric Psalmbook in the fall of 1999.

For a period during 1999 as the song "Wild Bird" received considerable radio exposure and became established as a hit, BigBang as a group was temporarily dissolved. The BigBang song "Long Distance Man" is an English adaptation (with completely rewritten lyrics) of a Norwegian song by Undertakers Circus, "Nettenes Prinsesse" from 1973.

The album Clouds Rolling By from 2000 was the start of commercial success for BigBang, as the song "Girl In Oslo" became established as a hit and had been released in several compilation albums by that time. In early 2001, BigBang was Launched in Germany, Switzerland and Austria with the EP release Girl In Oslo.

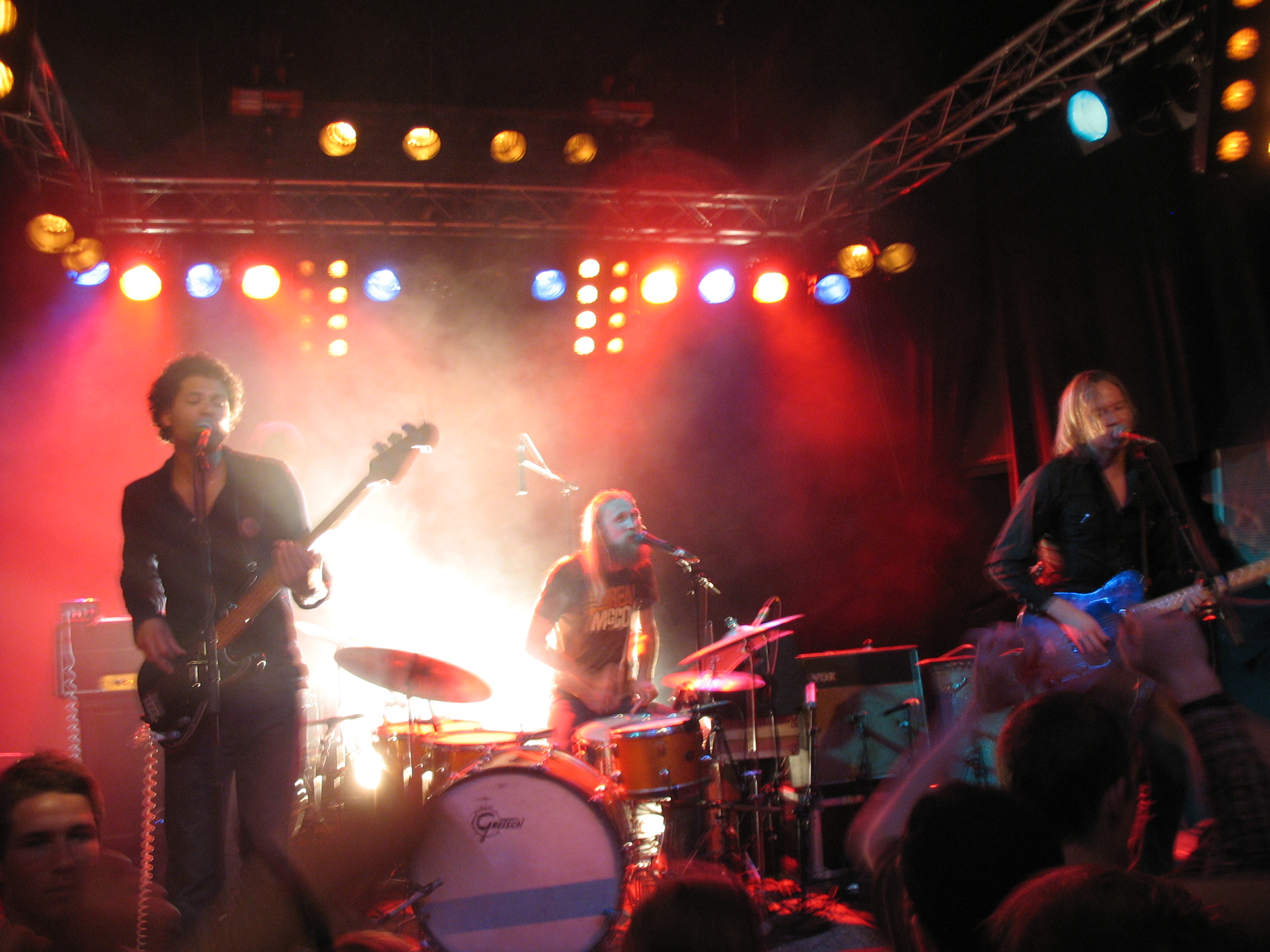
BigBang live in Kongsberg, April 2007

Drummer Olaf Olsen was absent from the band from May 2000 until he returned in May 2001. During this time, drums were played by Karim Sayed. In March 2002, BigBang released Frontside Rock'n'Roll. The album features the song "Frontside Rock'n'Roll", which Øystein Greni dedicated to two skaters he knew that had died in their youth. The title refers to a skateboarding trick requiring a high level of proficiency. The release was followed by a U.S. tour spanning five weeks.

The live album Radio Radio TV Sleep was released in August 2003. A double CD with half acoustic material, the album's title refers to a cheatcode often found on Norwegian hotel room TV remote controls to access pay-television. National network NRK taped a documentary over these live sessions, which climax is a performance of "Girl in Oslo" featuring five drummers, one of whom being Thor S. Greni.

In 2004 bassist Eilertsen departed from the band in order to focus on the group The National Bank, and former bassist Erik Tresselt returned to the band. With the April 2005 release of Poetic Terrorism, the band again utilised their own independent label Grand Sport in Norway, maintaining the role of Warner Music was for international and not domestic use.

Shortly after the release of the 2005 EP, Erik Tresselt left the band for the second time, and was replaced by Jarle Bernhoft, a former guitarist and vocalist of the Norwegian punk rock band Span. Bernhoft performed only one concert in Norway with the band. On the 2006 acoustic tour, former bassist and keyboardist Nikolai Eilertsen joined the band. During the concerts of this summer, Lasse Weeden played the bass.

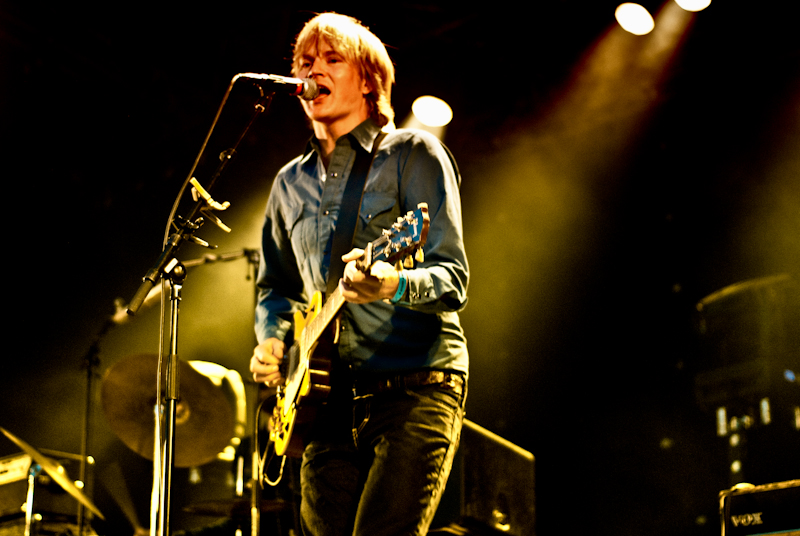
Øystein Greni performing live in 2009

Following their March 2007 album, Too Much Yang (2007), the band moved to Los Angeles, California in September 2007. Having employed several bassists during the year, Eilertsen did not wish to move to the U.S., and the role was filled by Lasse Weeden. The 2008 album From Acid to Zen was their American debut release, which received complementary reviews from among others David Fricke of Rolling Stone who selected the album as his "Fricke's Pick" and compared it to "a shotgun buffet".

As of 2009, the band released the seventh studio album Edendale, with Nikolai Eilertsen returning as bassist. In March 2011, BigBang released their eighth studio album, Epic Scrap Metal, and on exactly the same date two years later, in 2013, the trio released the album The Oslo Bowl. Big Bang released their tenth studio album, Glory Chord, in May 2019. The band’s most recent studio album, Le Californie, was released in April 2023.

== Members ==
Present

- Øystein Greni – guitar, bass, drums, percussion, vocals (1992–)
- Olaf Olsen – drums, percussion, backing vocals (1999–2000, 2001–)
- Nikolai Eilertsen – bass, keyboards, backing vocals (1999–2004, 2009–)

Past

- Christer Engen – drums (1992–1997)
- Martin Horntveth – drums (1997–1999)
- Kristian Syvertsen – drums (1999)
- Karim Sayed – drums (2000–2001)
- Erik Tresselt – bass (1992–1999, 2004–2005)
- Øyvind Storli Hoel – bass, backing vocals (2007–2008)
- Lasse Weeden – bass (2007)

Timeline

== Discography ==
=== Albums ===
Year	Album	Peak positions	Certification
Year	Album	NOR	Certification
1995	Waxed	—	
1999	Electric Psalmbook	—	
2000	Clouds Rolling By	2	
2002	Frontside Rock'n'Roll	3	
2005	Poetic Terrorism	1	
2007	Too Much Yang	1	
2009	Edendale	1	
2011	Epic Scrap Metal	1	
2013	The Oslo Bowl	1	
2019	Glory Chord	4	
2023	Le Californie		

=== Live albums ===
Year	Album	Peak positions
Year	Album	NOR
2003	Radio Radio TV Sleep (live, 2 CDs)	1

=== Compilation albums ===
Year	Album	Peak positions
Year	Album	NOR
2007	Something Special – The Best of Bigbang (live, 2 CDs)	15
2008	From Acid to Zen	

=== EPs and singles ===
Year	Title	Format	Peak positions	Certification	Notes
Year	Title	Format	NOR	Certification	Notes
1997	"How Do You Do?" / "Something Better"	7" promo	–		Yellow & Brown/Black limited editions
2000	Girl in Oslo	EP	3		Rereleased as an EP European edition in 2001
2000	New Glow	EP	12		
2001	Smiling For	EP	7		
2005	Not A Rolling Stone	EP	12		
2007	"Hurricane Boy"	7" promo	12		US promo limited edition
2007	"I Don't Wanna"	Single	9		
2009	"Swedish Television"	Single	11		US promo limited edition
2010	"Cigarette"	Single	-		
2011	"Everybody and Their Broken Heart"	Single	-		
2011	"Deserve Everything"	Single	-		
2011	"Field of Fire"	Single	-		
2012	"Like Americans Do"	Single	-		
2013	"The Oslo Bowl"	Single	-		
2019	"Glory Chord"	Single	-		
2019	"Compensator"	Single	-		
2019	"BELLS"	Single	-		

=== Video albums ===
- Radio Radio TV Sleep - (Live footage + bonus material) (2003)
