= Øystein Greni =

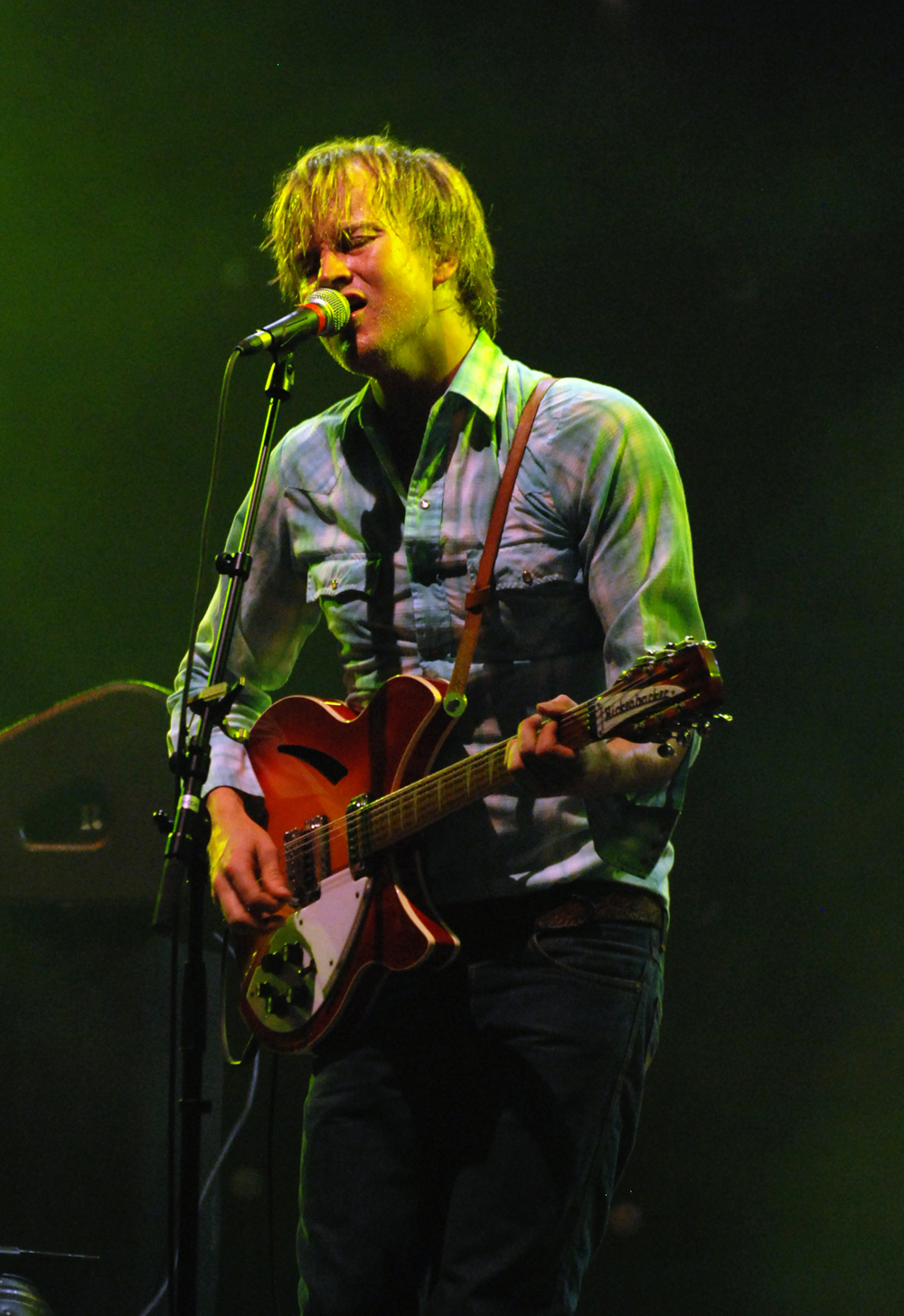
- Greni live with Bigbang in 2009

Background information
- Born: 15 June 1974 (age 52)
- Origin: Oslo, Norway
- Genres: Rock
- Instruments: Vocals; guitar
- Years active: 1992–present
- Label: Grandsport Records
- Website: https://bigbang.no/

Øystein Greni (born 15 June 1974 in Oslo) is the frontman and chief songwriter of the Norwegian rock band Bigbang. Greni founded the band in 1992 and has been the only constant member since its formation. He has released eleven studio albums with the Bigbang and one solo album.

== Biography ==
Øystein Greni is the son of Thor Sigbjørn Greni, singer and songwriter of the Undertakers Circus, a 60/70s soul band. In 1992, Greni, Erik Tresselt and Christer Engen formed Bigbang which has since established its position as one of the principal rock acts of Norway. As the only consistent member throughout the band's history, Bigbang's success is often attributed to Greni's skills as a guitarist and songwriter. In 2007, Greni and the band relocated to the United States.

In addition to his work with Bigbang, Greni also produces other acts. In 2003, he produced the EP debut of Latin performer Maria Orieta (Greni's fiancée) Buenos Aires via the Grandsport Records indie label. Greni is a former skateboarding champion, having won the 1991 European Skateboard amateur championship in Antwerp.

== Discography ==
=== With BigBang ===
==== Studio albums ====
- Waxed (1995)
- Electric Psalmbook (1999)
- Clouds Rolling By (2000)
- Frontside Rock'n'Roll (2002)
- Poetic Terrorism (2005)
- Too Much Yang (2007)
- From Acid to Zen (2008)
- Edendale (2009)
- Epic Scrap Metal (2011)
- The Oslo Bowl (2013)
- Glory Chord (2019)
- Le Californie (2023)

==== Live albums ====
- Radio Radio TV Sleep (2003)

==== Studio EPs ====
- Girl In Oslo (2000)
- New Glow (2000)
- Smiling For (2001)
- Not A Rolling Stone (2005)

=== Solo ===
- Pop Noir (2017)
