= Olaf Olsen (drummer) =

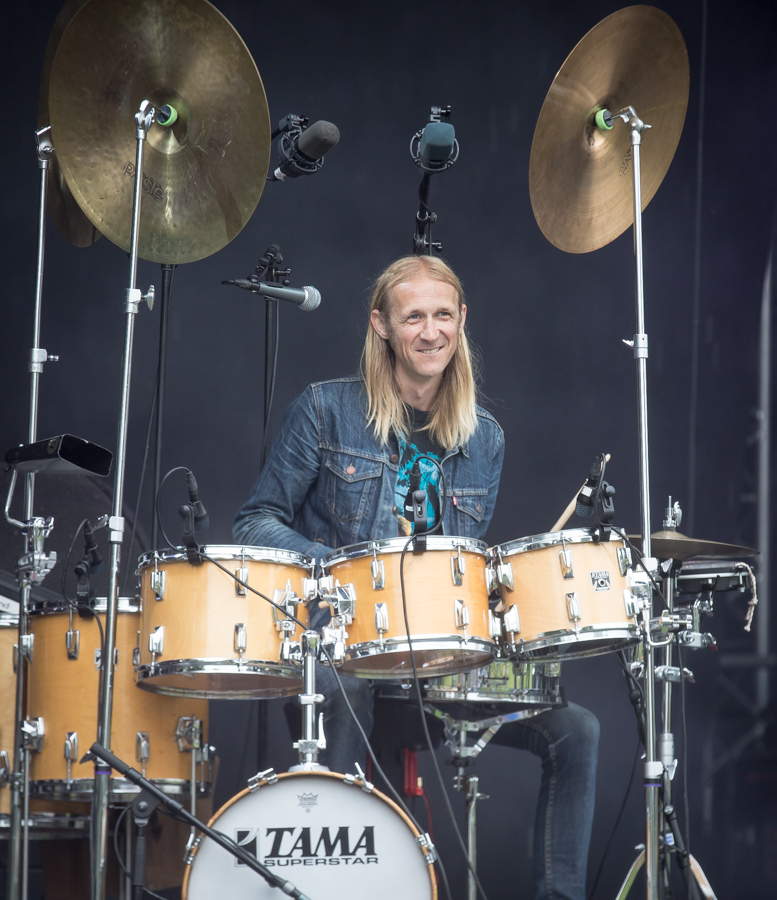
- Olaf Olsen performing in 2017

Background information
- Born: 8 August 1976 (age 48)
- Origin: Mjondalen, Norway
- Genres: Rock
- Instrument: Drummer
- Years active: 1999—present
- Labels: Grand Sport/Warner Music
- Website: bigbang.no

Olaf Olsen (born 8 August 1976) is a Norwegian musician, known as the drummer of BigBang (1999–May 2000, May 2001–current) with whom he has remained the longest after frontman Øystein Greni. He is renowned for his tall posture rising high above his drum kit, emphasized by his long blonde hair and beard. Olsen currently resides in Los Angeles, California, along with the other members of the band to try their luck in the United States.

== Career ==
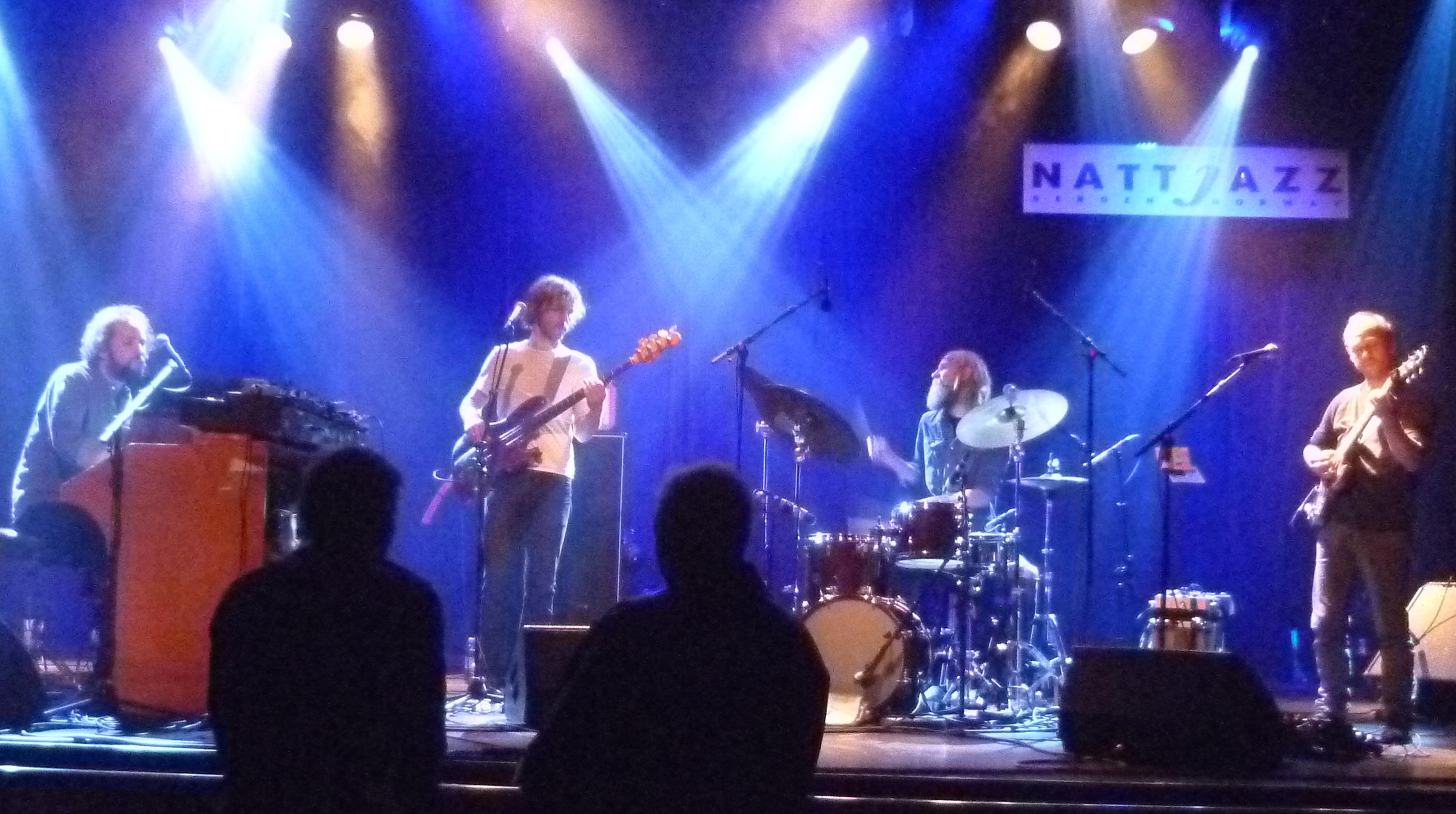
Olsen with Needlepoint at the 2016 Nattjazz in Bergen.

Following the departure of original BigBang drummer Christer Engen in the summer of 1997, it was long uncertain who would become the band's drummer. Singer and guitarist Øystein Greni would often take place behind the drums, and both Martin Horntveth (of Jaga Jazzist) and Christian Syvertsen (January–April 1999) did not stay long. In 1999, Olsen joined the band as their band's fourth drummer.

Olsen had left BigBang in May 2000. During this time, Danish rock musician Tim Christensen was just looking for a drummer to replace a replacement for Laust Sonne, who had accepted the position of drummer in the hard rock band D-A-D. They had just finished recording Christensen's first solo album Secrets on Parade and were getting ready to go on tour, so that a drummer was desperately needed at short notice. Since Christensen could not immediately find a suitable drummer, his record company EMI-Medley placed an anonymous ad in the June 2000 issue of GAFFA requesting applications for "a drummer for an established Danish rock artist". It asked for an experienced, energetic and technically good drummer between 20 and 30 years old that enjoys both hard and melancholic rock, and is available for a year ahead starting July 2000 for a domestic and international tour and related promotional activities. Christensen explains, "I subsequently spent endless difficult nights listening through the applications but before choosing between them, but before I had to decide, one of my friends told me about a drummer who had just left his Norwegian band BigBang, which seemed a fantastic opportunity to me. And it went well during a tryout, so we went with him." Olsen moved to Copenhagen and Christensen would later admit that "he [Olsen] has saved the band"

In May 2001, Olsen returned to BigBang but also continued playing in Christensen's band. He recorded albums and went on tour with both acts. The only time schedules conflicted was in the summer of 2002, during which time Johan Lei Gellet stood in for Olsen in Christensen's band. After recording drums for Christensen's second solo album Honeyburst (2003), the band toured extensively through Denmark, Norway, the Netherlands and the United Kingdom, to finish with a performance at the Abbey Road Studios, which was released as Live at Abbey Road Studios 2004 (2004). During the song Surfing the Surface, Olsen would often play on a miniature short-neck Fender Stratocaster, which strongly contrasted with his appearance. The Abbey Road performance was Olsen's final performance in Christensen's band; he left in 2005 to focus on drumming for BigBang and was replaced by Jesper Lind in Christensen's band. In 2008, he did play drums on half of the tracks on Superior (2008). In 2014 Olsen replaced Thomas Strønen in the band Needlepoint and performed with them on the album Aimless Mary and at the 2016 Nattjazz in Bergen.

Being the older brother of producer Todd Terje, Olaf often performs drums with Terje on his live shows.

== Equipment ==
- Gretsch (Round Badge and Stop-Sign Badge)
- Ludwig
- Slingerland
- Zildjian and Paiste cymbals
