= Ten Love Songs =

Studio album by Susanne Sundfør
- Released: 16 February 2015
- Recorded: 2012 – March 2014
- Studios: Lady Lazarus (Norway); La Colline Argentée (France); Det Grønne Rommet (Nesodden); Duper (Bergen); Echo Park (Bloomington, Indiana); Engfelt & Forsgren (Oslo); Pooka (Norway); Scorpius; Six Feet Over (Oslo); Spacebar (Brooklyn); Øra (Trondheim); The Exchange (London)
- Genres: Art pop; electropop; baroque pop; Italo disco; synth-pop; dance-pop; experimental pop
- Length: 46:39
- Label: Warner Music Norway
- Producers: Susanne Sundfør; Lars Horntveth

Susanne Sundfør chronology
| The Silicone Veil (2012) | Ten Love Songs (2015) | Music for People in Trouble (2017) |

Singles from Ten Love Songs
- 1. "Fade Away" Released: 24 October 2014; 2. "Delirious" Released: 12 January 2015; 3. "Kamikaze" Released: 18 May 2015; 4. "Accelerate" Released: 19 October 2015

Ten Love Songs is the fourth studio album by Norwegian singer-songwriter Susanne Sundfør, released on 16 February 2015 by Warner Music Norway. Sundfør began writing the album in 2012 with the intention of it being about violence, but as she noticed themes of love and relationships coming into place of all the songs she was writing for the album, she titled it Ten Love Songs.

The production and style of the record differed from Sundfør's previous albums; she was much more focused on making a pop album with "repetitive" and "direct" musical and lyrical structures than her past works. This was also the first time she was involved in all aspects of producing an album, including writing, recording, mixing, orchestration, and audio editing, and this huge amount of work as well as the extreme personal themes of the project led her to feel very ill, depressed, and "naked" when production ended in 2014. While half of Ten Love Songs was self-produced by Sundfør, the album also features collaborations with producers such as Lars Horntveth, Anthony Gonzalez, Jon Bates and Röyksopp.

Ten Love Songs spawned four singles: "Fade Away", "Delirious", "Kamikaze", and "Accelerate". The album and its lead single "Fade Away" became a commercial success in Sundfør's home country, with both receiving a gold certification. Ten Love Songs received acclaim from music critics, some of them called it one of the best albums of 2015 as well as all-time. The record landed on the year-end lists of several publications, topping Dagsavisen's annual Kritikertoppen list, also appearing on the lists of sources such as The Guardian and Rolling Stone, and ranking number 72 on The Village Voice's 2015 Pazz & Jop poll. It won Sundfør three Spellemannprisen in the categories of Album of the Year, Producer of the Year and Pop Soloist.

== Development and lyrical themes ==
In an interview on 26 March 2013, Sundfør revealed she was working on her fourth studio album; she stated that the project was going to be more "repetitive" and less "shifting" and "busy" than her previous record The Silicone Veil (2012). She also said that she recently bought a Roland TR-909 drum machine to give the record an "industrial and very cold" vibe.

Sundfør initially intended to make a record mainly about violence. Writing of Sundfør's fourth album began shortly after the release of The Silicone Veil, her first plan being to make a "universe" out of two songs she wrote before: "Accelerate" and "Trust Me". She initially visualized the tracks to consist of scenarios involving statues, buildings, and weaponry. When she wrote "Fade Away", however, she decided to go for a more romantic theme different from "Accelerate" and "Trust Me". The material she wrote later on for the album involved subject matter relating to the connection between love, relationships, and hatred; thus, the record ended up as a set of Ten Love Songs, titled as such after more than half of the songs that appear on the album were written. While most of the writing of Ten Love Songs took place in Norway, Sundfør also stayed at an apartment in New York for two months where she tried to write songs; however, she felt too uninspired to write much material, blaming it on the city she was in, and the attempt was unsuccessful.

The lyrics were influenced by numerous poets and writers notable for taking risks in their works, such as Anne Sexton, Sylvia Plath and Ernest Hemingway. While she wrote personal lyrics that were "heavy" to her when creating her previous albums, Ten Love Songs was where she went "too far" with what she was writing to the point where it "change[d] her mind". Writer Brenna Carley noted the use of long sentences for dramatic effect in the lyrics, calling it "a device that could sink a sterling ship were it not for the fact that such a slowdown allows for complete appreciation of her interwoven, goth-tinged lyrics."

Ten Love Songs deals with loss, grief, and the very dark and compulsive aspect of someone's love. It is a critique of humans being "vulnerable" and the consideration of this fact being "taboo". As Sundfør explained, "It's almost like the biggest weakness today is to be a human being, because everything around us is about perfection, as if we're trying to be like robots… If I listen to music or read books where people are saying 'I'm very human, I feel a lot of things, bad things, good things', that's what touches me." The title of Ten Love Songs is contradictory to the lyrical topics of the album; Sundfør called the title kitsch, explaining that the lyrics are never really about the topic of "love" that was "corny" at the time of its release, but rather the extreme topics about sex and violence that was discussed in the media. The tone of the artwork for Ten Love Songs, as well as its singles, done by artist Grady McFerrin also did not match that of the actual music on the album, which Sundfør said it "brought an interesting element to the record" by creating another "world or dimension" for it.

== Production ==
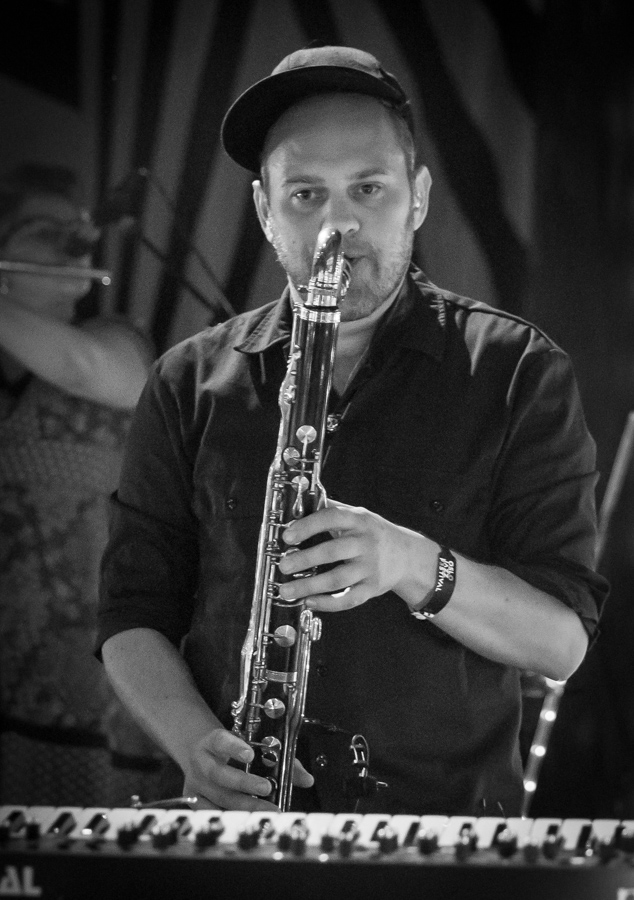
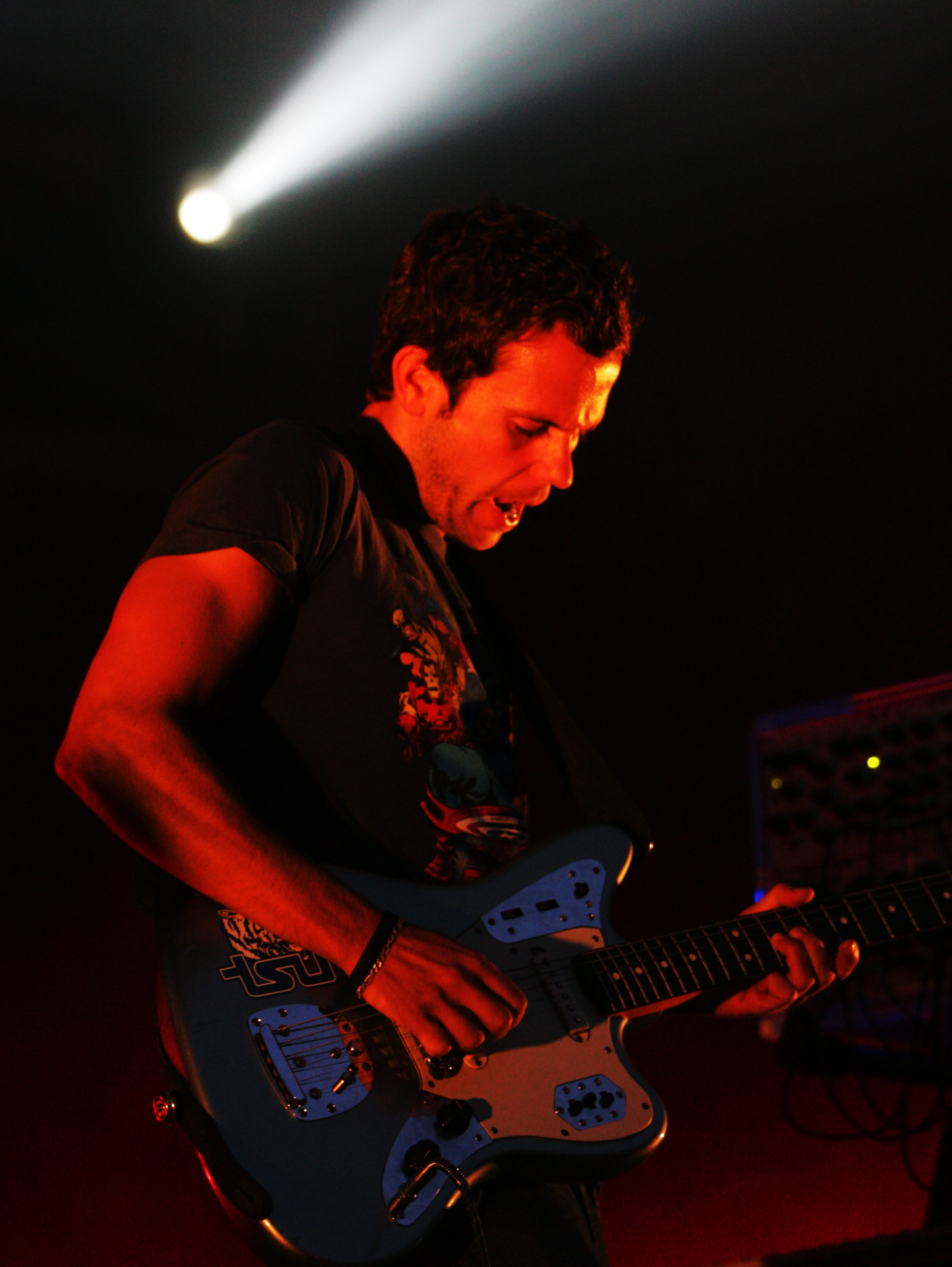
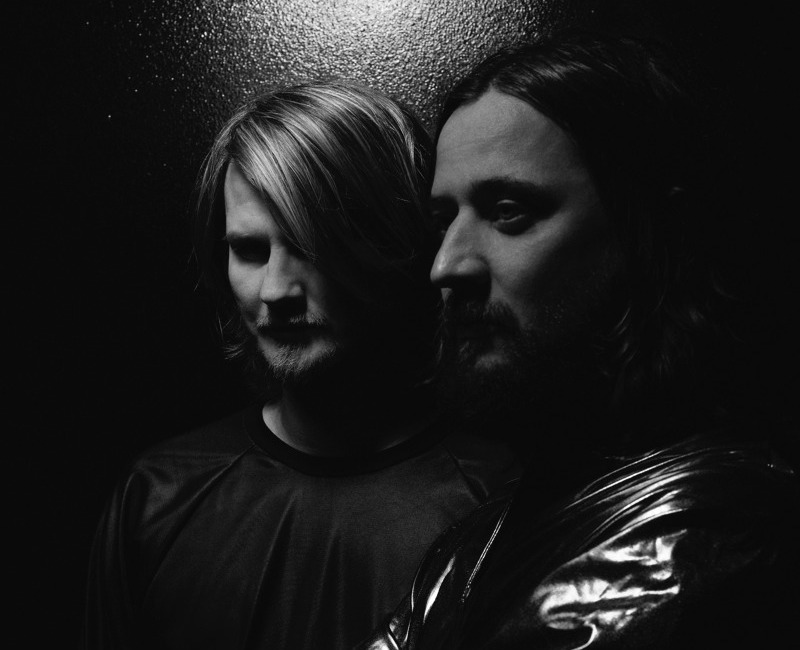
Ten Love Songs features production contributions from musicians such as Lars Horntveth (left), Anthony Gonzalez (middle), and Röyksopp (right).

"I feel that I have made a lot of progress working in the studio, especially different boxes involved! I have learnt so much about production; from how to use new synths to writing string arrangements. It's been a very exciting album to make. It was a lot of hard work but it was fun as well."

— Sundfør in an interview with No Fear of Pop

Sundfør garnered inspiration from the works of Philip Glass, Carly Simon and Roy Harper in making Ten Love Songs. While Ten Love Songs retains the same "cold" and bleak feel of her previous records such as The Brothel and The Silicone Veil, it is different from said previous records in terms of production and music style; Ten Love Songs was the first time Sundfør was majorly involved in every part of producing an album, including writing, recording, mixing, orchestration and audio editing. This independence led her to execute her ideas much better on Ten Love Songs than on her past albums. In order to keep herself creative and inspired while producing the album, she read the David Lynch book Catching the Big Fish (2006). In an October 2015 retrospective interview, she suggested the huge amount of work she did for the record, as well as the album's concepts about love and violence that were a part of her life, caused her to feel sick and suffer through depression after production of the album was finished in March 2014: "Joni Mitchell says it's like peeling your own onion, and that's how it is. I felt naked. Without skin."

Half of the album's cuts were self-produced by Sundfør, while other tracks, due to the fact that she occasionally felt "a bit lonely" when making the album, were collaborations with other producers. Ten Love Songs features production work from Lars Horntveth, Anthony Gonzalez of French band M83, American Big Black Delta leader Jon Bates and Norwegian duo Röyksopp. She learned from collaborating that another artist could bring "so much beauty and interest" on a track, leading her "to just admit to yourself that you can't be everything."

In going for an Italo disco sound, many elements of electronic dance music were incorporated into Ten Love Songs also unlike her past albums. As Sundfør explained, "It's quite instant. It's not like jazz, you can pretty much get it after a few listens. It doesn't mean it's bad but there's something more immediate about it – it's like candy almost." Her move towards electronic music from her previous folk works also led her to use "the studio as a creative tool in itself." Most of the album includes sounds influenced by 1980s synthesizer music. Sundfør used various hardware synthesizers and vintage drum machines such as Elektron's Machinedrum and SidStation. Sundfør focused on using hardware synths instead of software synths, reasoning that she liked "having real knobs and faders since it speeds up the process." Jørgen Træen mixed Ten Love Songs at Duper Studio in Bergen and was also responsible for a majority of the "mysterious sound effects" on the record, Sundfør's favorite being insects crawling out of an opening door that creaks. The mastering was handled by Mike Marsh at The Exchange in London.

== Composition ==
Another difference between Ten Love Songs from Sundfør's past works was that she was more prioritized making a pop album with "direct" sounds and lyrics over her past works. As she explained, "I wanted to be more mainstream. Not in the sense of the sound, but in terms of expression. There is something about pop songs that, to me, hits me more than any other types of song do. I've been a sucker for pop music since I was a little girl, and I've always wanted to make a pop record. So I guess this is my attempt!" The biggest challenge for Sundfør when creating Ten Love Songs was the melody writing, more specifically writing melodies that would be suitable for pop songs: "I read about how people's brains feel comfortable with patterns, but even better if it takes a little turn, so that you have surprise but also familiarity. It's like an orgasm for the brain." While keeping the structure of the songs "direct", she also went for making compositional elements that were "surprising" and "radical" in order to excite the listener. She loved music that was "going one way then goes another, like a beautiful maths piece." Journalist Doron Davidson-Vidavski compared these surprising elements, which are sudden shifts of tempo and volume, to those of Stanley Kubrick's 1980 film adaptation of Stephen King's The Shining (1977). There is also "greater dynamic variation" of the "darker, slower-moving and theatrically voiced aspects" of Sundfor's works present on Ten Love Songs than her past works, wrote The Quietus' Luke Slater.

Davidson-Vidavski categorized Ten Love Songs as a combination of the album Ceremony (2013) by Anna von Hausswolff and the Body Talk trilogy (Pt. 1, Pt. 2, and Pt. 3) by Robyn. Slater writes that the tracks are "movements" and their verses and choruses are "parts" of the movements. He writes that the orchestral segments of the record cripple the "grandness" of the album to let the listener process what they have just heard while moving on to the next track on the album. Chi Ming Lai of Electricity Club described the construction of the tracks as a "bizarre musical jigsaw puzzle", "a fascinating experience that continually asks the question: whats next?." musicOMH reviewer John Murphy wrote that Ten Love Songs is "not an easy listen", labeling it as "pop music beamed in from another planet, with an astonishing quota of ideas." Carley categorized Ten Love Songs as "Lykke Li by way of disco". The 405 spotlighted the record's "inconsistent" style, ranging from "languorous tragedies, to marketable pop gems, to tracks defined by distant, space-age syncopation". A critic for God is in the TV wrote that the style of the songs range from ABBA-esque ballads like "Darlings" and "Trust Me" to melancholy electronic dance numbers such as "Delirious" and "Slowly", that sound like more menacing versions of the works of Annie or Robyn.

== Songs ==
=== Tracks 1–5 ===
Ten Love Songs opens with "Darlings", the final track completed for the album. Chi Ming Lai of Electricity Club analyzed the track to be a "short church service", with only a harmonium and choir in its instrumental. Sundfør mournfully looks back about what she was hoping for and afraid of in her relationship, singing "So, it's definite, then." Murphy compared "Darlings" to "Hymn to Her" by rock band The Pretenders. The 405 reviewer Jennifer Jonson was mixed towards the track, criticizing its use of overused pop song breakup tropes in the lyrics with lines such as "We wanted to believe that love/could lift us to the skies and above" and, "We thought love could change our names/and free us from earthly chains."

"Accelerate" was the first song finished for Ten Love Songs. Analogized by Carley to be a "sequel" to Robyn's song "Dancing on My Own", "Accelerate" is about someone asking their lover to end their relationship. Murphy wrote that the song has an "indefinable quality that all good Scandi-pop music has." He reasoned that, while it has a mainstream dance element, the song is threatening and ominous, resolves on a gloomy note, and "adds layer after layer of oddness onto it." As he explained, "there’s a ridiculously catchy chorus that buries its way into your brain almost instantly, but there’s also a moment where you feel like you’ve accidentally broken into a particularly spooky abandoned church and you could be trapped in there forever." Opening with influences of what Ming Lai described the "spiritual longing" of the works of Depeche Mode, there are menacing, sober-sounding synthesizer arrangements as the song goes into a "rumbling rhythmic aggression" that are performed by a surrealist combination live and electronic drums. Ming Lai noted Sundfør's change of vocal tone on the track, writing that she "is resigned one moment, then vicious the next." Ming Lai analyzes the track's chorus then "turns into a widescreen assault." As the track reaches its climax, a baroque organ solo plays.

Sundfør wrote "Fade Away", Ten Love Songs's third track while driving down Los Angeles Route 101 when she felt the desire to make "a car song, just for fun." Musically, "Fade Away" was described as the most radio-friendly and upbeat song Sundfør has released in her career, and Slater called it to be one of Sundfør's best songs. The track was described by Chi Ming Lai as a Nordic noir. It features choir voice layers, "pulsing" electronic sounds and what Stein Østbø of Verdens Gang described as a "hypnotic" polyphony synthesizer solo inspired by the works of British rock band Queen. Østbø called the song's structure "quite easy, playful and almost a little naive in building". "Fade Away" was another track to garner comparison to "Dancing On My Own" from a journalist, this time James Hall of The Daily Telegraph who wrote that it borrowed its mid-tempo, "throbbing" synth bass, and "joyously upbeat and heartbreakingly sad" vibe from Robyn's song.

"Silencer" starts with a scarce feel as Sundfør sings, "Here I stand, with a gun in my hand, waiting for the water to come", before a harp and an arrangement of chamber strings enter the track. Ming Lai categorized the song as an "Ennio Morricone soundtrack for a glacial Spaghetti Western with a Fjord as the scenic backdrop". Jonson compared the beginning of the song to the Radiohead album Hail to the Thief (2003) due to its "haunting" electronic textures and Sundfor's high-pitched vocals. "Kamikaze", also called by Slater one of Sundfør's best tracks, is a Europop track that begins as a ballad with the vibe of a sparse setting similar to that of "Silencer". It then it turns into a thundering four-on-the-floor dance song that includes space-like synthesizer staccatos, a trance-style drop and sound effects of guns and war fields. The song ends with a harpsichord part. For making "Kamikaze", Sundfør wanted to make a plane crash sound effect with the analogue synthesizer Swarmatron. She signed up for a six-month waiting period to get the synthesizer, but was still unable to receive it. She then tried to a build a similar synthesizer from scratch, but failed. This led her to contacting Swarmatron's inventor, Leon Dewan, via Skype in order to find out how to get the synthesizer.

=== Tracks 6–10 ===
"Memorial" is a ten-minute track that follows a person's lament of an ended relationship. Sundfør began writing "Memorial" in 2012 as simply a piano ballad. However, Sundfør then chose to add other instruments such as "starry" synthesizer sounds and an acoustic guitar to the track's instrumentation in order for it to fit with the "big" sound of Ten Love Songs. Thus, the piano ballad served as the final half of the track and Sundfør arranged strings for the song while in New York to add a Philip Glass element to it. Sundfør used a score sheet of an arrangement of one of Glass's compositions for reference. The part's viola line was borrowed from Fantaisie-Impromptu by Polish composer Frédéric Chopin. The end result was a collaboration with Gonzalez that consists of three acts. The first movement is a 1980s-power-ballad-style reimagining of the song "Fernando" by ABBA, consisting of drums, electric guitars, and synthesizers courtesy of Gonzalez and vocals. The second act is a baroque chamber piano-and-strings part and the final movement is where Sundfør vocals re-enter the track. Murphy described the track as a self-parody piece of work that "never tips over into ludicrousness". Ming Lai used the song's lyric "You are heartless cos you took off my dress, and you never put it on again" as an example of Sundfør's use of her theatrical representation of vulnerability that she previously experimented with her previous, such as the song "Meditations in an Emergency" from The Silicone Veil or "Walls", a cut from her self-titled debut studio album.

The spy film-esque song "Delirious" follows the viewpoint from a femme fatale about how love is really a fight someone doesn't want to have, as Sundfør sings in a vibrato, "I'm not the one holding the gun." The song begins with an intro in the style of "The Electrician" by pop group The Walker Brothers, before string sections, gun-like percussion sounds, and harsh electronic instruments enter the track. Murphy noted it to be similar to the works of Tove Lo. "Slowly" is the most vintage-sounding track on Ten Love Songs, as well as the lightest in terms of tone, and slows down the pace of the record. "Trust Me", like "Darlings", is a ballad only consisting of an organ. Ten Love Songs ends on a fierce cliffhanger with the techno track "Insects", a "dark take on Carpe Diem" according to Sundfør. It is about the non-existence of relationships and love in the corporate landscape. As Ming Lai described the meaning of the song, "it is said that only insects will survive a nuclear holocaust, so this is a stark consequential reminder of what could happen in a world without love." It is the album's harshest track, consisting of what Ming Lai described as an apocalyptic sound palette of "machine gun drums" and "unsettling air raid sirens"

== Singles ==
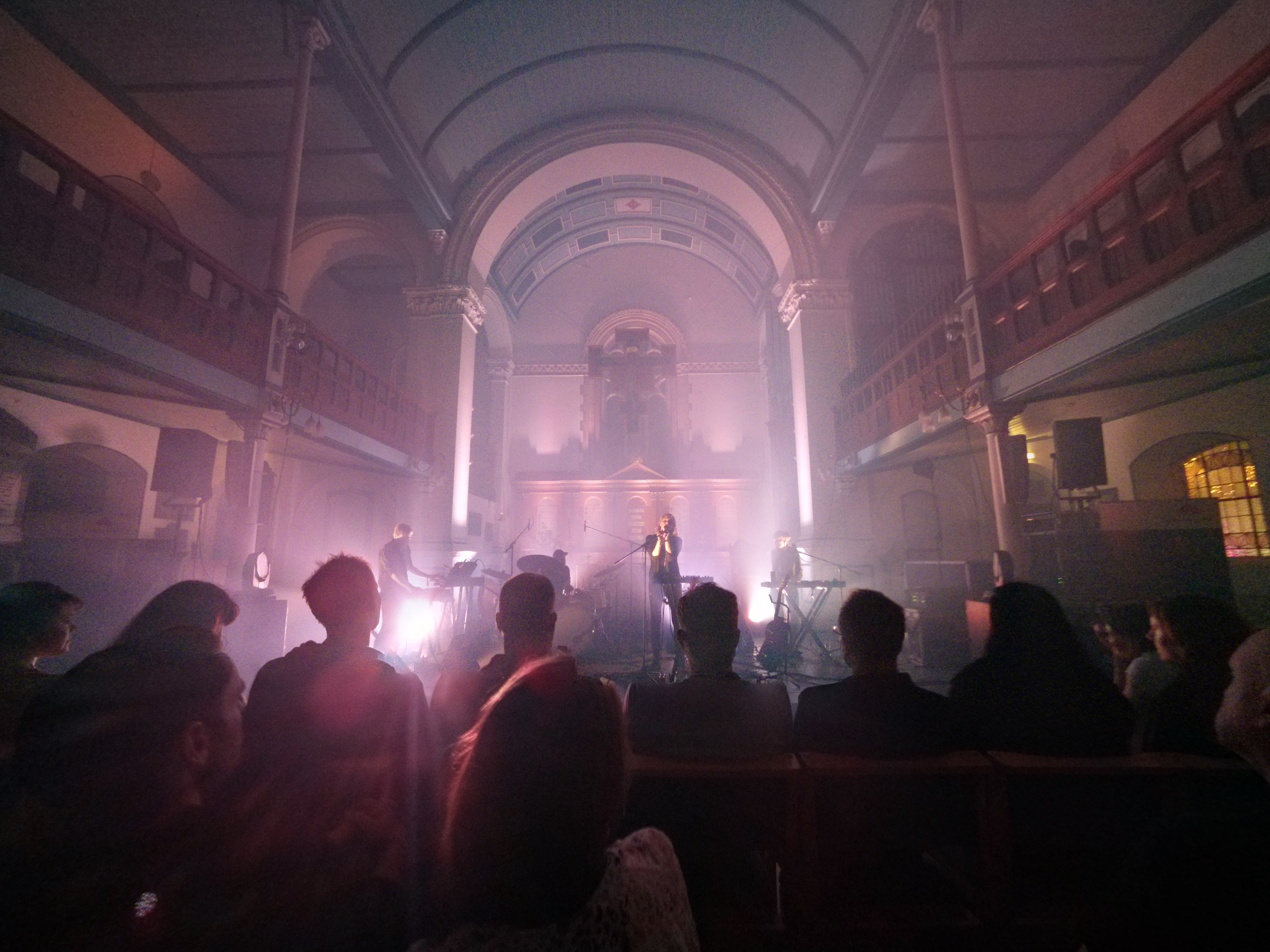
Sundfør performing at The Great Escape Festival, in St George's Church, Brighton, 2015

On 24 October 2014, it was announced Ten Love Songs was to be released on 16 February 2015, and "Fade Away" was released as the album's lead single. Upon the album's release, the song debuted at number 25 on the Norwegian VG-lista singles chart and lasted on the chart for two weeks. On 13 April 2015, the song was certified gold by IFPI Norway. The remix EP for the song was released on 28 November 2014 and includes four remixes by Maps, Coucheron, Bjørn Torske, and Bates' Big Black Delta project. The 405 premiered the Maps' remix of the song on 24 November 2014. On 3 December 2014, the music video for "Fade Away" was released. Directed by Lærke Herthoni, it depicts Sundfor in a hectic, foggy dream world filled with silhouettes. On 8 January 2015, the second single of the album, "Delirious", premiered in the magazine The Fader. A remix EP for the song, issued on 2 February 2015, is a set of three remixes by Richard X, Andre Bratten, and I Break Horses. "Delirious" was ranked number 97 on Pretty Much Amazing's list of "The 100 Best Songs of 2015". Pitchfork released the "dark, glitchy" video for "Accelerate", which was directed by Stian Andersen, on 19 October 2015. The clip directed by Stian Andersen shows a "dark, glitchy perspective on the artist as she thrashes around on stage".

== Reception ==
Professional ratings
Aggregate scores
| Source | Rating |
|---|---|
| AnyDecentMusic? | 8.2/10 |
| Metacritic | 87/100 |
Review scores
| Source | Rating |
| Dagsavisen | 5/5 |
| Gaffa (Denmark) | 4/6 stars |
| Gaffa (Norway) | 6/6 stars |
| Gaffa (Sweden) | 6/6 stars |
| The Guardian | 5/5 stars |
| Mojo | 4/5 stars |
| musicOMH | 5/5 stars |
| Nothing but Hope and Passion | 4/5 |
| Release Magazine | 10/10 stars |
| Spin | 7/10 |

Ten Love Songs received widespread acclaim from music critics upon its release, with some reviewers calling it one of the best albums of 2015 as well as of the decade and all-time. The record was the sixteenth most critically well-received release of 2015 according to Metacritic, receiving perfect-score reviews from reviewers of publications such as musicOMH, Release Magazine, the Norwegian and Swedish editions of Gaffa magazine, and The Guardian. Some critics called Ten Love Songs perfect in every way. These included a reviewer from God Is in the TV, who said that it "has so many special moments" and "not a single second feels wasted", and Fredrik Schlatta Wik, who wrote that "there is something about her voice, melodies, chord progression and lyrics that move me", which he wrote it was rare for an album to move him.

Murphy called Ten Love Songs "enormously creative", "endlessly surprising", and "what Lana Del Rey could be if she stopped moping about bad boys and wore something other than that damned red dress". Ming Lai praised Ten Love Songs for its successful combination of experimental avant-garde and accessible pop music, calling it an "artistically accomplished albums that grows and gets better with each listen". Reviewer Michael Hann deemed it a "quite brilliant album" and "both appealingly direct yet perfectly thought-through". Some critics, including Slater and a reviewer for Sonic Seducer, called Sundfor's lead vocals the best aspect of the album. Writer Maura Johnston highlighted the record's "gorgeous, rich backing arrangements". A reviewer for the newspaper Dagsavisen praised Sundfør's singing as well as her songwriting: "This is her personal reminiscences about love, but it is impossible not to immerse themselves in the universal suffering aspects of love that are produced here. The combination of her popkløkt and intimate narrative style has resulted in an album that will move the listener." In a more lukewarm review, Jonson called Ten Love Songs "musically captivating without being thematically original", calling the lyrics "a bit familiar" but otherwise praising the record as an "undoubtedly unique" take "to an often-tired genre".

=== Accolades ===
Ten Love Songs landed on numerous year-end lists by publications such as Drowned in Sound, The Guardian, and Rolling Stone, and it ranked number 72 on The Village Voice's annual Pazz and Jop poll. For her work on Ten Love Songs, Sundfør won three 2015 Norwegian Grammy Awards: Best Album of the Year, Best Pop Artist, and Best Music Producer. While she was very thankful for receiving these awards, she also called it "strange" she garnered them.

| Publication | Rank |
|---|---|
| Dagsavisen | 1 |
| Drowned in Sound | 22 |
| Gigwise | 52 |
| Gorilla vs. Bear | 27 |
| The Guardian | 21 |
| Mashable | 9 |
| musicOMH | 13 |
| Pazz & Jop (The Village Voice) | 72 |
| Popjustice | 12 |
| Pretty Much Amazing | 48 |
| Rolling Stone (Pop) | 18 |

== Track listing ==
All tracks are written by Susanne Sundfør.

Ten Love Songs track listing
| No. | Title | Producer(s) | Length |
|---|---|---|---|
| 1. | "Darlings" | Sundfør | 2:39 |
| 2. | "Accelerate" | Sundfør; Jon Bates^{[a]} | 5:26 |
| 3. | "Fade Away" | Sundfør | 3:18 |
| 4. | "Silencer" | Sundfør; Lars Horntveth | 3:28 |
| 5. | "Kamikaze" | Sundfør | 5:12 |
| 6. | "Memorial" | Sundfør; Anthony Gonzalez^{[b]} | 10:06 |
| 7. | "Delirious" | Sundfør | 4:56 |
| 8. | "Slowly" | Sundfør; Röyksopp^{[a]} | 4:27 |
| 9. | "Trust Me" | Sundfør | 4:02 |
| 10. | "Insects" | Sundfør | 3:05 |
| Total length: | | | 46:39 |

Notes

- ^{^[a]} signifies an additional producer
- ^{^[b]} signifies a co-producer

== Personnel ==
Credits adapted from the liner notes of Ten Love Songs.

Musicians

- Susanne Sundfør – vocals, arrangements, synthesizers, acoustic guitar, autoharp, harmonium, celesta, cembalo, drum programming, grand piano, Rhodes piano, percussion
- Gard Nilssen – drums, percussion
- Lars Horntveth – arrangements (4), classical guitar, synthesizers
- Nikolai Hængsle Eilertsen – bass guitar
- Anthony Gonzalez – electric guitar, drum programming, synthesizers
- Jon Bates – synthesizers, drum programming, electronics, "microwave oven"
- Jørgen Træen – synthesizers, drum programming, electronics
- Josh Humphrey – electronics
- Abe Seiferth – electronics
- Nils Martin Larsen – synthesizers
- Morten Qvenild – celesta
- Leon Dewan – synthesizers
- Morten Myklebust – acoustic guitar
- Röyksopp – "healing", "aura displacement", synthesizers
- Iver Sandøy – percussion
- Trondheim Soloists – strings:
  - Anders Larsen – first violin
  - Anna Adolfsson Vestad – first violin
  - Erling Skaufel – first violin
  - Stina Elisabet Andersson – first violin
  - Åse Våg Aaknes – first violin
  - Tora Stølan Ness – second violin
  - Hilde Kjøll – second violin
  - Ingrid Martine Wisur – second violin
  - Nella Penjin – second violin
  - Frøydis Tøsse – viola
  - Anne Våg Aaknes – viola
  - Ragnhild Torp – viola
  - Cecilie Koch – cello
  - Marit Aspås – cello
  - Eivind Rossbach Heier – cello
  - Rolf Hoff Baltzersen – double bass

Technical

- Susanne Sundfør – production, recording at Lady Lazarus Studio in Norway
- Marcus Forsgren – recording at Engfelt & Forsgren Studio in Oslo, Norway
- Lars Horntveth – production (4), recording at Pooka Studio in Norway
- Anthony Gonzalez – co-production (6), recording at Studio La Colline Argentée in France
- Josh Humphrey – recording at Studio La Colline Argentée in France
- Jørgen Træen – recording and mixing at Duper Studio in Bergen, Norway
- Abe Seiferth – recording at Spacebar Studios in Brooklyn, New York
- Nils Martin Larsen – recording at Six Feet Over in Oslo, Norway
- Morten Qvenild – recording at Det Grønne Rommet in Nesodden, Norway
- Jon Bates – additional production (2), recording at Echo Park Studios in Bloomington, Indiana
- Röyksopp – additional production (8), recording at Scorpius Studio
- Jo Ranheim – strings recording at Øra Studio in Trondheim, Norway
- Mike Marsh – mastering at The Exchange in London, United Kingdom

Artwork

- Grady McFerrin – artwork
- Magnus Rakeng – album layout

== Charts ==
Chart performance for Ten Love Songs
| Chart (2015) | Peak position |
|---|---|
| Norwegian Albums (VG-lista) | 1 |
| Scottish Albums (Official Charts) | 90 |
| Swedish Albums (Sverigetopplistan) | 47 |
| UK Albums (Official Charts) | 78 |
| UK Independent Albums (Official Charts) | 23 |

== Certifications ==
Certifications for Ten Love Songs
| Region | Certification | Certified units/sales |
|---|---|---|
| Norway (IFPI Norway) | Gold | 15,000^{‡} |
^{‡} Sales+streaming figures based on certification alone.
