= Yngve Sætre =

- Born: Yngve Leidulv Sætre; 13 May 1962 (age 63); Ørsta, Møre og Romsdal
- Origin: Norway
- Genres: Electronica, rock music
- Occupations: Musician & music producer
- Instruments: Keyboards, vocals
- Label: Smalltown Supersound

Yngve Leidulv Sætre (born 13 May 1962 in Ørsta, Norway) is a Norwegian record producer, musician (vocals and keyboards). He worked as a record producer in Sigma Studio, before, together with Jørgen Træen, he started Duper Studio in Møhlenpris, Bergen in 1996.

== Career ==
Sætre has produced albums for several well-known Norwegian artists and bands, like DumDum Boys (five albums), Anne Grete Preus (Alfabet), Kaizers Orchestra, Kjetil Grande (Uppers, Downers, Screamers & Howlers), Ephemera (Sun), Vidar Vang (Stand Up Straight), "Trang Fødsel" (Hybel and Damp), Christine Sandtorv (First last dance), og 3 album for John Olav Nilsen & Gjengen.

He is also known as the lead singer of the Norwegian band Barbie Bones (1987–1993) from Bergen. They received the Spellemannprisen 1992 award in the category Pop band, for the album Death in the Rockinghorse Factory. He has in recent years been the keyboardist in the bands Popium and Tweeterfriendly Music. Sætre was awarded producer price during Spellemannprisen 2009.

== Honors ==
- 1992: Spellemannprisen in the category Pop band, for the album Death in the Rockinghorse Factory, within the band Barbie Bones
- 2009: Spellemannprisen in the category Producer

== Discography (in selection) ==
Within Secret Mission

- 1986: Watch The Night (Famous Records)
- 1986: ........To Be Continued (Famous Records)

With deLillos

- 1987: Før Var Det Morsomt Med Sne (Sonet Grammofon), ("Hun Har Gått Seg Vill")

Within Forbidden Colours

- 1989: Words to the World & Songs for the Girl (Colour Records)

Within Barbie Bones

- 1990: Brake For Nobody (EMI Records)
- 1992: Death in the Rockinghorse Factory (EMI Records)

With Pogo Pops

- 1992: Pop Trip (Norsk Plateproduksjon)
- 1993: Crash (Norsk Plateproduksjon)
- 1995: Pure (Norsk Plateproduksjon)
- 2009: Darling Emm, Northern girl (VME)

With Butterfly Garden

- 1996: For You (Service Records), including with Kjartan Kristiansen

With Ephemera

- 2000: Sun (Ephemera Records)
- 2004: Monolove (Ephemera Records)

Within Tweeterfriendly Music

- 2000: Vol. 1 Maxi Single (Warner Music Norway)
- 2001: Enjoy Tweeterfriendly Music Vol. 2 (Warner Music Norway)
- 2003: Gin & Phonic ***3-03 (Warner Music Norway)

With Sondre Lerche

- 2001: Faces Down (Virgin Records)

With Ralph Myerz & The Jack Herren Band

- 2001: A Special Album (Emperor Norton)
- 2004: Your New Best Friends (Emperor Norton)

With Sister Sonny

- 2001: The Bandit Lab (Rec90)

With Morten Abel

- 2003: Being Everything, Knowing Nothing (Virgin Records)

With Christine Sandtorv

- 2006: First Last Dance (Ifemmera Records)

With Toy

- 2007: Half Baked Alaska (Smalltown Supersound)

With John Olav Nilsen & Gjengen

- 2009: For Sant Til Å Være Godt (Voices of Wonder Records)
- 2012: Den Eneste Veien Ut (Virgin Records)

With Maria Due

- 2010: Kissing in Public (Trust Me Records)

With Fjorden Baby!

- 2011: Se Deg Rundt I Rommet (Fjorden Biznizz)

With Razika

- 2011: På Vei Hjem (K. Dahl Eftf.)
