= Hypertext (band) =

Norwegian band

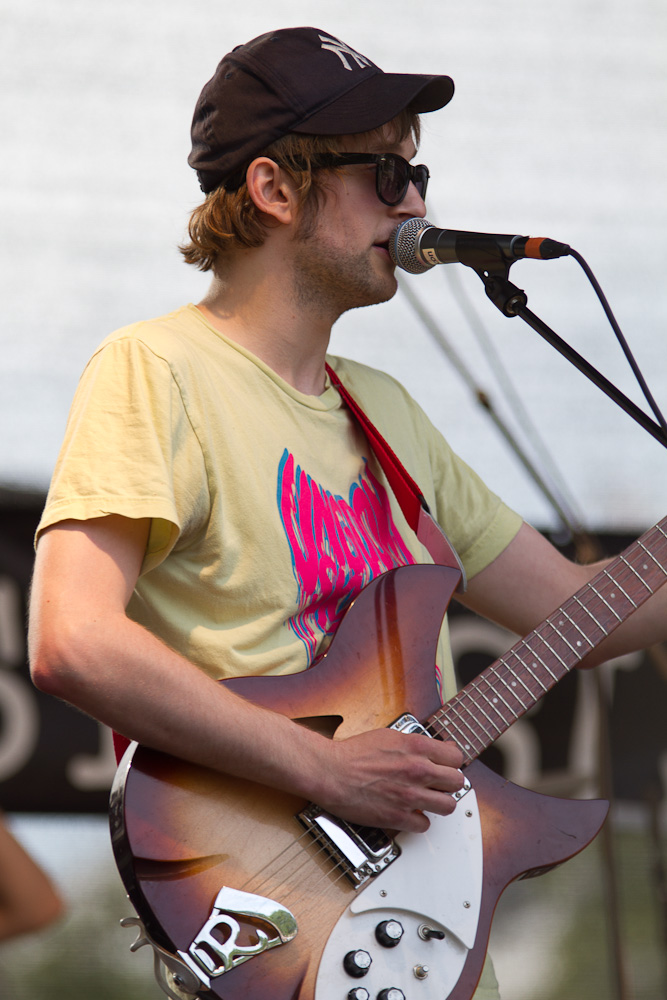
- Erik Johan Bringsvor performing with Hypertext during Musikkfest Oslo, 2010.

Background information
- Origin: Bergen, Norway; Oslo, Norway
- Genres: Krautrock; experimental pop; noise; shoegaze; electronic
- Years active: 2006–present
- Labels: Emelie; Sound Collective
- Members: Erik Johan Bringsvor; Anders Bjelland; Snorre S. Lyngstad; Joachim A. Trana; Øivind Hatleskog; Annette Kathinka Servan
- Past members: Susanne Sundfør

Hypertext (stylized as HYPERTEXT) is a Norwegian band based in Bergen and Oslo and formed in 2006.

== Biography ==
Based in Bergen and Oslo and established in 2006 as a quartet, the band has since grown into a sextet including members from various other bands. It consists of Annette Kathinka Servan (vocals, keyboards), Øivind Hatleskog (vocals, keyboards), Erik Johan Bringsvor (vocals, guitar), Anders Bjelland (guitar), Joachim A Trana (drums), and Snorre Lyngstad (bass). Over the years, the band has played many shows in Norway and Europe, among them festivals like Øya, Hove, Spot and by:Larm.

Their debut studio album, Corrente Elektro, was released in 2007. It was described as an alternative rock record with British punk influences. Bringsvor stated that the album "was a result that, as a 19-year-old, I tried to make music without doing it before," and later mentioned that it was heavily inspired by bands such as Sonic Youth and Blonde Redhead. In 2010, singer-songwriter Susanne Sundfør briefly joined the band, contributing vocals and keyboards. They released their second album, Astronaut Kraut! later that year, which they worked on with producer Jørgen Træen and several guest musicians including Kjetil Møster. Since then, they have released the albums Progmatism (2013) and SuperSystem Vibe (2017).

Borrowing from many different genres, the band has been noted for mixing elements of krautrock, noise, shoegaze, electronic, Steve Reich, melodies and vocal harmonies. The Fly stated that "there's nothing not to like about Hypertext, with all of their little Wilco-esque quirks, expansive, shimmering guitars and soaring melodies. They are excellent." The 405's Hector Barley characterized the band as experimental pop, later adding that the band's music "is some of the most highly distinctive, inventive and engaging that I've heard of late. Their sound is undoubtedly hard to pin down, schizophrenically jumping all the way between kraut-rock, space-pop to rich harmony-led indie pop, yet always retains a strong pop sentiment and idiosyncratic arrangements." Lyngstad and Hatleskog cited the Residents and the Flaming Lips as influences, respectively.

== Band members ==
Current members

- Annette Kathinka Servan – vocals, keyboards
- Øivind Hatleskog – vocals, keyboards
- Erik Johan Bringsvor – vocals, guitar
- Anders Bjelland – guitar
- Joachim A Trana – drums
- Snorre Lyngstad – bass

Former members

- Susanne Sundfør – vocals, keyboards

== Discography ==
=== Studio albums ===
- Corrente Elektro (2007)
- Astronaut Kraut! (2010)
- Progmatism (2013)
- SuperSystem Vibe (2017)

=== Singles ===
- "Wales" / "Futuristic Box" (2008)
- "Ivy League" / "Mary" (2010)
- "Landing in Rotation" (2012)
- "Walken" (2012)
- "Hwacha" (2012)
- "The Paradox Decide" (2013)
- "Skyhook" (2013)
- "White Prints" (2016)

=== Guest appearances ===
- "Silence Room" – Alternative Trippin', Vol. 2 (2008)
