= A Night at Salle Pleyel =

Live album by Susanne Sundfør
- Released: 18 November 2011
- Recorded: 18 August 2011
- Venue: Sentrum Scene (Norway, Oslo)
- Genre: Experimental; electronica
- Length: 47:02
- Label: EMI Music Norway

Susanne Sundfør chronology
The Brothel (2010)	A Night at Salle Pleyel (2011)	The Silicone Veil (2012)

A Night at Salle Pleyel is a live instrumental album by Norwegian singer-songwriter Susanne Sundfør, released on 11 November 2011. The album was recorded at Sentrum Scene in Oslo on 18 August 2011, and served as commission piece for the Oslo Jazzfestival's 25th anniversary. It is composed solely of synthesizers with a team of four keyboardists chosen by Sundfør.

== Background ==
The album was commissioned by the Oslo Jazzfestival, which asked Sundfør to write 44 minutes of music: "I didn't have any other restrictions or guidelines or anything. So I decided to make a piece of music for a string quintet. And then, when I started writing, during the process I got more and more convinced that this would sound really cool with just five synths. So at the beginning it sounds more like classical music and then it goes more and more into this synth world." Sundfør said she considers the album to be more of a side project to her main project.

== Track listing ==
All tracks are written by Susanne Sundfør.

No.	Title	Length
1.	"Movement 1"	8:53
2.	"Movement 2"	7:24
3.	"Movement 3"	3:58
4.	"Movement 4"	13:30
5.	"Movement 5"	3:37
6.	"Movement 6"	9:40
Total length:		47:02

== Credits and personnel ==
Credits adapted from the liner notes of A Night at Salle Pleyel.

=== Locations ===
- Recorded at Sentrum Scene
- Mixed at Duper Studio
- Mastered at Digital Domain

=== Personnel ===
- Susanne Sundfør – composition, Waldorf Blofeld Synthesizer, Korg KP-3 Kaosspad
- Ådne Meisfjord – Waldorf Blofeld Synthesizer, Electro-Harmonix Memory Man, Electro-Harmonix POG, Electro-Harmonix Frequency Analyser, Electro-Harmonix Holy Grail, Roland RE-20 Space Echo, Robotalk Random Arpeggiator
- Morten Qvenild – Waldorf Blofeld Synthesizer, Moog Voyager Filter Section, Roland RE-20 Space Echo, Ibanez Tube Screamer Keeley Mod, Zvex Tremorama, Zvex Fuzzfactory, Moogerfooger Analog Delay, Oto Machines Biscuit, Mackie 802-VLZ3 Line Mixer
- Øystein Moen – Waldorf Blofeld Synthesizer, Elektron Octatrack, Ableton Live, Motu Express 128, Akai LPK25, Akai MPK25, Boss Spaceecho, Roland RE-20 Space Echo
- Christian Wallumrød – Waldorf Blofeld Synthesizer, Electro Harmonix Micro Synthesizer, Moogerfooger LFO
- Thomas Hukkelberg – recording
- Jørgen Træen – mixing
- Bob Katz – mastering
- MVM – design, artwork
