= Brothel (disambiguation) =

A brothel is a place where people engage in sexual activity with prostitutes.

Brothel may also refer to:

- Brothel (film), 2008 film by Amy Waddell
- "Brothel" (Law & Order: Special Victims Unit), a 2019 episode of the twentieth season of the TV series
- The Brothel, 1888 painting by Vincent van Gogh
- The Brothel, 2010 album by the Norwegian artist Susanne Sundfør
