= Bjarte Ludvigsen =

Bjarte Ludvigsen, a.k.a. Blue, (born 20 May 1975) is a record producer from Bergen, Norway. He started out as a drummer for the Norwegian-Grammy Award winning band Poor Rich Ones. In 1997, after working as a session musician for several years and as an assistant engineer at Sigma Audio, Bjarte started Tinnitus Recording together with Christer Hjelmeland. After helping several acts rise to the ranks and signing with major companies, the studio got popular with more established Norwegian artists.

In 2004, Bjarte Ludvigsen took over the company and is now the owner of the studio.

In 2007, he produced and engineered William Hut's gold selling album Nightfall, where he also played drums, keyboards and programmed. The single "Take it easy" stayed 29 weeks in the Top 20 charts, reaching number 1 and sold 3 times platinum.

Bjarte Ludvigsen has been working with acts such as; William Hut, Askil Holm, Corvine, Lorraine, Furia, Ralph Myerz and the Jack Herren Band, Röyksopp, Brimstone Solar Radiation Band, Tucos lounge, Ephemera, Matias Tellez, Syme, Marthe Valle, Chand and Malsain.

Bjarte Ludvigsen owns Bluenoise Plugins. The company creates useful and professional sounding plugins for the studio recording business. The first commercial plugin released was Bandecho which is a tape delay plugin and the company is well known for its Drummix line.

Bjarte Ludvigsen has written several screenplays and was in 2010 signed to the company Woolf+Lapin for a manuscript called The Divided Story.

== Discography ==
Doddo og Unge Frustrerte Menn, Doddo og Unge Frustrerte Menn, (CD, Album) 1995

Ephemera, Temporarily Happy (CD, Single, Promo), BMG Norway AS, RCA 1996

Ephemera, Glue (CD, Album), BMG Music 1996

Poor Rich Ones, Naiveties Star, Rec 1996

Poor Rich Ones, Bubble Bowling (CD, EP), Rec90 1997

Trang Fødsel, Hybel (CD), Norsk Plateproduksjon AS 1997

Poor Rich Ones, From the makers of Ozium, Rec 1997

Anne Lorentzen, Kvinne Søker Kvinne (CD, Single, Promo), Grappa 1997

Various, North Transit - A Sampler From Rec 90 (CD, Smplr, Promo, Car), Rec90 1998

Rune Hauge, Taxi (CD, Album), Bergen Records 1999

S.O.S, Diverse Artister (CD, DVD) 1999

Poor Rich Ones, Happy Happy Happy (CD), Rec90 2000

Covine, Nova (CD, EP) EMI music 2002

Ephemera, Sun (CD, Album), Ephemera Records 2000

Ephemera, Happy, Grateful, Aware / Saddest Day (Fet Frokost Mix) (CD, Single), Ephemera Records 2001

Ephemera, Tornardo (CD, Single) (Remix), Ephemera Records 2001

Poor Rich Ones, John Maynards Favourites (CD, Double Album), Rec 90 2001

Askil Holm, Seven Days In The Sun EP (CD, EP, Ltd), Apache Records 2002

Diverse Artister, This is Norway, (CD, Album) 2002

Furia, ...And Then We Married The World (CD, Album), MTG, Dreamlab Records 2003

Multipass, This is Jiggy Jiggy, (CD, Album) 2003

Ralph Myerz & The Jack Herren Band - Think Twice / Dub Pirates / A Special Morning (CD, Mini), Emperor Norton 2003

Lorraine, Lorraine EP (CD, EP), Rec90 2003

Lorraine, Perfect Cure (CD, Album), Rec90 2004

Diverse Artister, Gullars...og barndommen fortsetter (CD, DVD) PS! Records 2004

The Brimstone Solar Radiation Band, (CD, Album) Big Dipper Records 2004

Syme, Planetarium (CD, EP) 2004

Tucos Lounge, Bounty (CD, EP) 2004

Malsain, They Never Die (CD, Album), Karisma Records 2005

Brimstone Solar Radiation Band, Solstice (CD, Album), Big Dipper Records 2005

Push, Rum in Raspberry Jelly (CD, Album) Karisma 2005

William Hut, Nightfall (CD, Album), Universal, Mercury 2006

Tucos Lounge, Crazy Love (CD, Album), Banana Party 2007

Bart, Esperanto Of Cool (CD, Album), More Cowbell Records 2008

Brimstone, Smorgasbord, (CD, Album), Big Dipper 2009

Fenrik Lane, 317 (CD, Album), 2010

Major Parkinson, Songs from a Solitary Home (CD, Album), Degaton Records 2010

Alfred Hall, So Bright (CD, Single) Waterfall Music 2011

Marthe Valle, Si (CD, Single) Universal Music 2o12

Chand Torsvik, Livet Ditt (Digital, Single) 2012

William Hut, The Gathering (CD, Album) Universal Music, 2012
