= Music for People in Trouble =

Studio album by Susanne Sundfør
- Released: 8 September 2017
- Studio: Duper Studio; NRS Recording Studio; Tropical Hi-Fi Studio; Bella Union Studios; Lady Lazarus Studio; Amper Tone Studio; Propeller Music Division
- Genre: Art pop; chamber folk
- Length: 44:39
- Label: Bella Union
- Producer: Susanne Sundfør; Jørgen Træen

Susanne Sundfør chronology
Ten Love Songs (2015)	Music for People in Trouble (2017)	Blómi (2023)

Singles from Music for People in Trouble
- 1. "Undercover" Released: 6 June 2017; 2. "Mountaineers" Released: 24 July 2017

Music for People in Trouble is the fifth studio album by Norwegian singer-songwriter Susanne Sundfør, released on 8 September 2017 through Bella Union. Recorded with longtime collaborator Jørgen Træen in breaks between Sundfør's travels across the world, the album represents a departure from the synth-pop of Ten Love Songs (2015) in favor of a return to her roots as a folk singer-songwriter.

The album received highly positive reviews from music critics, with some calling it her best work to date. It debuted at number one on the Norwegian album charts, making it her fourth consecutive album to achieve this feat. The album was supported by two singles, "Undercover" and "Mountaineers". The first was released as the album's lead single on 6 June, and the latter, which features American singer-songwriter John Grant, on 24 July.

== Background ==
Sundfør released her fourth studio album, Ten Love Songs, on 16 February 2015. The album showcased Sundfør experimenting with an electronic dance pop sound alongside textured orchestral arrangements. The album was considered to be Sundfør's international breakthrough, while also debuting at number one in Norway, receiving universal acclaim from music critics and appearing on various year-end lists. She later went on tour in promotion of the album. Sundfør has stated that after she finished the album she became physically and mentally ill: "I was getting flu all the time. Depression, anxiety. It's taken me a long time to get back again. I was wobbling and...I'm still struggling with it." She believes this was partly a result of almost every aspect of the album's making, including production, composition, mixing and recording, which she mostly worked on by herself, but also as a result of the album's themes, "in which she delved into her own life to examine the links between extreme love and violent hatred." It was shortly after when she began work on Music for People in Trouble.

== Writing and recording ==
In a November 2015 interview, Sundfør stated that she was working on the album, calling it "very cosmic" and added that a lot of the inspiration for it came from reading the book A Universe from Nothing. The album was mainly inspired by a journey Sundfør made, "travelling across continents to contrary environments and politically contrasting worlds from North Korea to the Amazon jungle." She stated: "[The trips] made me focus on something other than myself; it made me curious and hungry for new impressions and new motives for my photography. It's hard to pinpoint exactly how it affected my music, but all experiences are potentially inspiring for creativity. I didn't travel to write; I traveled to take pictures, which to me is an important part of the album. that emptiness is the place where things start to grow. Most of the universe is empty. So, I'm not afraid of that anymore." She said the album is about how "we are living in a time of great changes. Everything is moving so rapidly, sometimes violently, sometimes dauntingly. I think a lot of people experience anxiety these days. I wanted to address these emotions on the album." She also cited American poet Robert Bly's 1980 anthology News of the Universe as one of the album's inspirations.

Sundfør wrote most of the songs "in bed in Dalston, looking at foxes pooping in the garden", with an ease she hadn't experienced since her self-titled debut album (2007). She began writing all the "guitar songs" at home in London, while she later traveled to Los Angeles and wrote "Good Luck Bad Luck" and "No One Believes in Love Anymore". She then went back to London and wrote "Mountaineers", followed by "Bedtime Stories" at a cabin in Woodstock, with the final track she wrote for the album being "The Golden Age". Unlike the self-produced Ten Love Songs, which led her to depression, Sundfør decided not to try and do everything herself this time, and worked with longtime collaborator Jørgen Træen, which she thought "was a very good idea." The recording of the album was completed in 2016 in Bergen.

== Music and lyrics ==
"Everybody's got issues. We are all insane. It's not a political album, and it's not therapy. It's music that you can listen to [in order] to hear somebody else is thinking the things you are thinking. We are killing our planet. You can engage politically, you can join Greenpeace, but at the same time you can still feel really sad and scared and appalled. This album is about trying to find a way to stay sane and calm."

—Sundfør regarding the album's title.

Music for People in Trouble represents a departure from the synth-heavy, "disco-infused prog" Ten Love Songs (2015), with a stripped back focus on Sundfør's "high, plangent" voice and acoustic guitar and piano. Sundfør explained this by being "tired of technology": "I wanted to feel like I was a musician again. But also, what I wanted to say needed something organic to convey it." She called the album a return to her roots, whereas Ten Love Songs was "more of a detour." Throughout the album, Sundfør's vocals are mostly accompanied only by piano or guitar, with occasional usage of samples and electronic textures which "take the songs into experimental territory," such as "trickling water sounds, wiry bleeps and animal peeps," inspired by Sundfør's travels from North Korea to the Amazon rainforest. Sundfør stated she wanted to "try and mix up some innocent romantic sounds with something very industrial and dry sounds." The album has been described as Sundfør's most personal, affecting and poignant record yet.

Characterized primarily as an art pop and folk album, Music for People in Trouble also incorporates jazz, ambient, chamber pop, country, drone and musique concrète. Sundfør co-produced the album with Jørgen Træen, who could contribute through his arrangements, "such as the sounds of an old lady in her apartment and a ticking grandfather clock on 'Bedtime Story' or the spoken-word intro on 'Music for People in Trouble'." Sundfør has cited several influences on this album, including Carole King, Carly Simon, Joni Mitchell, Elton John, Leonard Cohen, and alternative music. The Daily Telegraph described the album's subject matter as "dark, conflating a destructive personal relationship with environmental damage, heartbreak and climate change," while also noting that it represents an almost complete about-turn from the shiny commercialism of Ten Love Songs. The Guardian called the album Sundfør's Biophilia moment. PopMatters noted the experimental sound of the album, and thought it resonates with the music of Jenny Hval.

=== Songs and lyrical content ===
The albums opens with the acoustic "Mantra", where Sundfør proclaims herself to be "as clever as a crow, as lucky as the moon, and as mighty as a shark." Sundfør said "all the objects in the song often have ominous or negative connotations in history," so she "wanted to give them a more positive meaning." Evening Standard said Sundfør sings on the track "like she's haunted by Leonard Cohen." On the second track "Reincarnation", which is the first she wrote for the album, Sundfør sings over an "achingly beautiful" slide guitar about disbelieving the news, questioning mortality and the nature of love. She stated she thinks the song is "more about light than about darkness." "Good Luck Bad Luck" is a "resigned end-of-romance dirge" sung over folk guitar, piano, double bass and baritone sax, and ends with a slowed-down jazz break. The Guardian's Harriet Gibsone said it is "like an Adele song, if Adele sung about oil spills to the sound of smoky, late-night jazz."

The next track, "The Sound of War" is a near eight-minute folk song that declares "chaos remains." It features the lyric "the buzzing of the drones," which appear later in the song, adding a "moody, cinematic soundscape." The track begins "with the sound of a mountain stream and all manner of bird calls, it blossoms out into a modern madrigal, with lute-like guitar and Sundfør's voice restrained and husky. About halfway through, it falls away to leave a hellish, industrial synth drone, reminiscent of the textures of the Knife's Shaking the Habitual, or the ambient sound design of a David Lynch soundtrack." Described as "an art installation-like interlude," the "glitchy" title track begins with an echoing voice punctuated by bleeps (samples of Gesang der Jünglinge by Karlheinz Stockhausen) that recall sound effects from 80s sci-fi, and follows with a spoken passage from naturist Andres Roberts, in which he responds to the question: "What would you say to someone who has given up on life?" asked in an interview by Sundfør. Halfway through the song, a plucked acoustic guitar, later accompanied by a flute, carries the song to its conclusion. Tom Pinnock of Fopp said Sundfør embraces musique concrète on the track. The "spooky, meditative" track "Bedtime Story" contains "ambient footsteps, cell phone beeps, and wandering clarinet that highlight the cruel boredom of insomnia." The Quietus described it as the album's "most lyrical moment: a sweeping fusion of piano and clarinet that recalls the heady, jazz-flecked adventuring of Joni Mitchell and her woodwind virtuoso Tom Scott on For the Roses."

The lead single "Undercover" is a country-tinged piano ballad that grows as the song progresses, and ends with climactic, "chilling vocals." Sundfør has stated she was inspired by Dolly Parton when she wrote the song. The eighth track "No One Believes in Love Anymore" is a mournful piano ballad that is a "cynical loss of faith in romance." "The Golden Age" is the last song Sundfør wrote for the album. It contains a "bleeping Moog melody" which The Irish Times described as "a gloriously avant garde moment." The song is built on a simple arpeggio progression, and has hints of jazz, folk and electronica, although according to musicOMH "its real roots lie with 'Feed the Birds' from Mary Poppins, a song that not only deals with keeping the wildlife well fed, but also concerns social responsibility and empathy. For a song so delicate and gentle, there's a surprising amount going on here." The album closes with "Mountaineers", a "gothically glittering" duet with American singer-songwriter John Grant, who "chants a tale of romantic breakdown and plane crashes over an ominous drone reminiscent of late-period Scott Walker." The songs contain electronic textures and gospel influences within its church organ and soulful choir.

== Release and promotion ==
On 28 May, Sundfør started posting on Twitter every day a song title with a few of its lyrics in the order of the track listing until 6 June, when she announced the album's release. That same day, "Undercover" was released as the first single along with a pre-order of the album, which was originally scheduled for release on 25 August 2017. "Undercover" was supported by a radio edit, cutting the song to a length of 3:28. The album is her first to be released under Bella Union. It includes the song "Reincarnation", which Sundfør released in 2016. Tour dates in support of the album were later announced via her official website. On 24 July, "Mountaineers" featuring John Grant was released as the second single.

On 18 August, Sundfør announced that the album's release date has been delayed to 8 September for CD and digital download and 29 September for vinyl release, due to "unforeseen circumstances."

On 21 August, "Mantra" was premiered on the BBC Radio 6 Music show, Jon Hillcock Sits In.

== Critical reception ==
Professional ratings
Aggregate scores
Source	Rating
AnyDecentMusic?	7.9/10
Metacritic	80/100
Review scores
Source	Rating
AllMusic	4/5 stars
Clash	8/10
Evening Standard	4/5 stars
The Guardian	4/5 stars
The Irish Times	4/5 stars
The Line of Best Fit	8/10
MusicOMH	4/5 stars
The Observer	3/5 stars
Q	4/5 stars
Spectrum Culture	4.5/5 stars

At Metacritic, which assigns a normalized rating out of 100 to reviews from mainstream publications, the album received an average score of 80, based on twelve reviews, indicating "generally favorable reviews". In her review for The Guardian, Harriet Gibsone said the album is "another triumph for Sundfør, who delivers complex, maudlin subjects with lightness and majesty." Claire Biddles from The Line of Best Fit said "Music for People in Trouble perhaps doesn't have the crossover appeal that Ten Love Songs had, and its head-on engagement with contemporary struggles will certainly not be for everyone. But for those who are done with escapism, at least for an hour or so, its sustained mood brings rich rewards." Writing for The Observer, Emily Mackay said, "as the album's title suggests, Sundfør wishes to pour oil on the choppy waters of a weary world, and the warm clarity of her voice offers beautiful moments of respite." MusicOMH's Sam Shepherd stated that the album "will perhaps be a surprise for those who came to Sundfør via her last album, but they won't be disappointed. This is an album full of hidden depths, stark emotion, and most importantly, absolutely beautiful songs."

The Quietus' Gary Kaill praised the album, saying Sundfør "turns experience into art with a painter's eye and a warrior's heart, and Music for People in Trouble is a profoundly humanist work: her finest by some distance." Jennifer Gannon of The Irish Times said the album "is a sweeping, seductive cinematic slice of sorrow. It's not all brooding bombast, though: the pastoral folk of 'The Golden Age', with its bleeping Moog melody, gives it a touch of Wicker Man weirdness, a gloriously avant garde moment that leaks into the haunting finale of the John Grant duet 'Mountaineers', which soars to anthemic levels of beauty. This kind of sadness can truly be a blessing." James Christopher Monger of AllMusic said the album "is rooted in empathy, and even at its most cynical – the woebegone 'No One Believes in Love Anymore' comes to mind – the warmth of its core radiates outward."

Jonathan Wright from God Is in the TV said "Sundfør has followed perfection with an equally brilliant album. The sparse instrumentation and bleak lyrics are part of her captivating journey into new territories, where she continues to create enriching music. She does it all with no sign of compromising. Music for People in Trouble is another exceptional masterpiece from the best songwriter around." Clash's Luke Winstanley wrote, "Music for People in Trouble takes more creative risks than its predecessor, and though this may deter some, it proves to be a decision that pays off. Far from diminishing the project, the end product is another outstanding record, executed with fearlessness and grace." Spectrum Culture's John Paul praised the album, writing, "Music for People in Trouble is nothing short of a personal and professional triumph for Susanne Sundfør."

== Track listing ==
All tracks are written by Susanne Sundfør, except track 5, written by Sundfør and Jørgen Træen; all tracks produced by Sundfør and Træen.

Music for People in Trouble track listing
No.	Title	Length
1.	"Mantra"	3:31
2.	"Reincarnation"	4:05
3.	"Good Luck Bad Luck"	3:40
4.	"The Sound of War"	7:49
5.	"Music for People in Trouble"	2:55
6.	"Bedtime Story"	3:31
7.	"Undercover"	4:17
8.	"No One Believes in Love Anymore"	5:21
9.	"The Golden Age"	4:09
10.	"Mountaineers" (featuring John Grant)	5:21
Total length:		44:39

== Personnel ==
Credits adapted from the liner notes of Music for People in Trouble.

- Susanne Sundfør – vocals, production, grand piano, acoustic guitar, synthesizer, arrangements, programming, recording, creative direction, photography
- Jørgen Træen – production, double bass, electric guitar, synthesizer, arrangements, programming, mixing, recording
- John Grant – vocals (track 10)
- Jesse Chandler – flute, clarinet, alto clarinet
- Jon Balke – grand piano
- Gard Nilssen – drums, percussion
- Frans Petter Eldh – double bass
- Greg Leisz – pedal steel guitar
- André Roligheten – saxophone
- Megan Kovacs – kanklės
- Erik Johan Bringsvor – acoustic guitar
- Andres Roberts – spoken vocals (track 5)
- Lewis Sebastian Kay-Thatcher – spoken vocals (track 9)
- Iggy B – recording
- Johnny Skalleberg – recording
- Scott Petito – recording
- Clay Schmitt – recording
- Kåre Christoffer Vestrheim – recording
- Greg Calbi – mastering
- Luke Jarvis – layout, design

== Charts ==
Chart performance for Music for People in Trouble
Chart (2017)	Peak position
Belgian Albums (Ultratop Flanders)	124
Norwegian Albums (VG-lista)	1
Scottish Albums (OCC)	51
UK Albums (OCC)	93

== Certifications ==
Certifications for Music for People in Trouble
Region	Certification	Certified units/sales
Norway (IFPI Norway)	Gold	10,000^{‡}
^{‡} Sales+streaming figures based on certification alone.

== Release history ==
Release history and formats for Music for People in Trouble
Region	Date	Label	Format	Ref.
Various	8 September 2017	Bella Union	CD; digital download	
Various	29 September 2017	Bella Union	LP	

== See also ==
- List of number-one albums in Norway
