= The Silicone Veil =

Studio album by Susanne Sundfør
- Released: 23 March 2012
- Studio: Pooka Studio; Kikitépe Tearoom Studio
- Genre: Folktronica; electronic; art pop; baroque pop; synth-pop
- Length: 44:26
- Label: EMI Norway; Sonnet Sounds
- Producer: Susanne Sundfør; Lars Horntveth

Susanne Sundfør chronology
A Night at Salle Pleyel (2011)	The Silicone Veil (2012)	Ten Love Songs (2015)

Singles from The Silicone Veil
- 1. "White Foxes" Released: 24 February 2012; 2. "The Silicone Veil" Released: 8 June 2012; 3. "Among Us" Released: 2013

The Silicone Veil is the third studio album by Norwegian singer-songwriter Susanne Sundfør, released on 23 March 2012 in Norway and on 15 October in the United Kingdom. It is her first album to be released in the UK. The album was recorded at Pooka Studio and Kikitépe Tearoom Studio. Three singles were released from the album, "White Foxes", "The Silicone Veil" and "Among Us". The video for "Among Us" was directed by Evan McNary and was premiered on Vice's Noisey. Sundfør chose the video as part of a competition by Genero.tv for fans to make a video for the single.

== Composition ==
Characterized primarily as electro-folk, The Silicone Veil has also been classified as a mixture of baroque pop, electronic, and art pop. The Daily Telegraph said the album is "a flawless distillation of dreamy synth-pop, imposing Scandinavian electronica and showy baroque classicism." The Ontarion wrote, "Sundfør displays an extensive vocal range – from high warbling pitches to quietly provocative tones – but it is the presence of a deeply entrancing and eclectic array of unique electronic and orchestra generated sounds which makes this sensory experience truly worthwhile."

Sundfør described the songs on The Silicone Veil as being a reflection of "apocalypse, death, love and snow."

== Critical reception ==
Professional ratings
Review scores
Source	Rating
Gaffa (Denmark)	4/6 stars
Gaffa (Norway)	5/6 stars
The Line of Best Fit	8.5/10
MusicOMH	4.5/5 stars
Sputnikmusic	4/5

The album received critical acclaim from music critics. In his rave review of the album, Daniel Paton of MusicOMH praised Sundfør for not being afraid to explore "both her lyrical and musical preoccupations to challenging and sometimes uncomfortable depths," stating that "The Silicone Veil is every bit as magisterial and conceptually loaded as her previous album of songs. [...] Selecting examples and highlights can hardly begin to offer an impression of the boldness and confidence of this wonderful album. Sundfør's combination of careful, detailed arrangement and unrepentant magic realism is visionary and enriching." Sputnikmusic's Nick Butler said "while her voice feels like the album's main strength on first listen, it doesn't take long to appreciate how good the music is here. The mood is consistent, wistful and pretty, but the sound touches on all sorts of bases," while later hailing the album for being "carefully orchestrated, beautiful sung, and imaginatively written." The Line of Best Fit critic Michael James Hall wrote, "this is an album of spectral, elemental romance and intrigue, playfully but precisely woven into a tremulous tapestry of seemingly ever-oscillating sound."

In 2015, The Ontarion awarded the album their "Album of the Week" accolade, stating: "While the 29-year-old Norwegian artist released her fifth studio album Ten Love Songs earlier this year, The Silicone Veil is one album that definitely calls for (repeated) revisiting." The Daily Telegraph included the album in their "50 amazing albums you've never heard" list in August 2017, calling it Sundfør's finest work to date.

== Track listing ==
All tracks are written by Susanne Sundfør.

No.	Title	Length
1.	"Diamonds"	5:02
2.	"White Foxes"	4:16
3.	"Rome"	6:44
4.	"Can You Feel the Thunder"	4:56
5.	"Meditations in an Emergency"	2:39
6.	"Among Us"	4:23
7.	"The Silicone Veil"	5:02
8.	"When"	4:05
9.	"Stop (Don't Push the Button)"	4:13
10.	"Your Prelude"	3:16
Total length:		44:26

== Credits and personnel ==
Credits adapted from the liner notes of The Silicone Veil.

=== Locations ===
- Recorded at Pooka Studio and Kikitépe Tearoom Studio
- Strings recorded at Øra Studio
- Mixed at Duper Studio
- Mixed at The Best Studio in Oslo (track 2)
- Mastered at Cutting Room Studios

=== Personnel ===
- Susanne Sundfør – vocals, production, arrangements, piano, synthesizers, Fender Rhodes Electric Suitcase piano, synth bass, vibraphone, autoharp, drum programming, string arrangements, recording
- Lars Horntveth – production, arrangements, bass guitar, synthesizers, lap steel guitar, pedal steel guitar, acoustic guitar, vibraphone, tubular bells, synth bass, church organ, piano, drum programming, string arrangements, recording
- Gard Nilssen – drums, percussion
- Jørgen Træen – additional drum programming and editing, electronics, mixing
- Øystein Moen – synth bass (track 6), church organ (track 8)
- Erik Johannessen – trombone
- Line Horntveth – tuba
- Sunniva Rødland Wettre – harp
- Rolf Hoff Baltzersen – contrabass
- Stian Westerhus – electronics (track 1), mixing (track 2)
- Jo Ranheim – strings recordings
- Björn Engelmann – mastering
- MVM – artwork

TrondheimSolistene

- Anders Larsen – violin
- Anna Adolfsson Vestad – violin
- Daniel Turcina – violin
- Erling Skaufel – violin
- Fride Bakken Johansen – violin
- Hilde Gimse – violin
- Ingrid Wisur – violin
- Karl Jonatan Lilja – violin
- Tora Stølan Ness – violin
- Bergmund Waal Skaslien – viola
- Frøydis Tøsse – viola
- Lars Marius Hølås – viola
- Cecilie Koch – cello
- Marit Aspås – cello
- Tabita Berglund – cello
