= Kjell Aartun =

Norwegian theologian and linguist (1925–2023)

Kjell Aartun (6 July 1925 – 28 May 2023) was a Norwegian theologian and linguist. He was considered a leading expert on Semitic languages, particularly the Ugaritic language. He was also known for several controversial theories on runic interpretation and the origin of Minoan civilization. Aartun received a government scholarship (statsstipendiat) in 1983 and received HM The King's Medal of Merit in Gold for his scientific work in 2001. He was a member of the Norwegian Academy of Science and Letters from 1986.

== Life and career ==
Aartun was born in Sjernarøy Municipality on 6 July 1925. He obtained the Cand.theol. degree in 1954, and an additional degree in Greek in 1956. He was a Research Fellow from 1956 to 1961 and a Research Fellow/Lecturer from 1962 to 1965. Aartun was Research Fellow in West Berlin from 1965 to 1968, and Lecturer/Associate Professor at Stavanger lærerhøgskole from 1968 to 1992. He was also a Docent in Jerusalem in 1971, director of the Swedish Theological Institute in Jerusalem in 1974 and Docent of Semitic Languages at Lund University from 1976 until 1978. He obtained the dr. philos. degree in 1978, with a dissertation on the Ugaritic language in two volumes titled Die Partikeln des Ugaritischen (Kevelaer, 1974/1978).

In his extensive two-volume work on Minoan civilization, Die Minoische Schrift (Harrassowitz Verlag, 1992/1997), Aartun asserts that the ancient Minoan culture was Semitic. His book Runer i kulturhistorisk sammenheng (Pax Forlag, 1994) asserts that Runic inscriptions found in Scandinavia were written in a Semitic language. These publications have made him a controversial figure among both non-linguists and mainstream linguists since the early 1990s, with critics accusing him of producing pseudoscience.

His autobiography, Et forskerliv i Janteland ("A Researchers Life in the Country of Jante"), was published in 2004.

Aartun was the grandfather of singer-songwriter Susanne Sundfør. She dedicated her sixth studio album Blómi to Aartun, incorporating excerpts of his works in the lyrics.

Kjell Aartun died on 28 May 2023, at the age of 97.

== Selected publications ==
- Die Partikeln des Ugaritischen, 2 vol., Kevelaer, Butzon & Bercker, 1974/1978
- Die Minoische Schrift, 2 vol., Wiesbaden, Harrassowitz Verlag, 1992/1997
- Runer i kulturhistorisk sammenheng: En fruktharhetskultisk tradisjon, Oslo, Pax Forlag, 1994
- Et forskerliv i Janteland, Oslo, Kolofon, 2004
