= Blómi =

Studio album by Susanne Sundfør
- Released: 28 April 2023
- Genre: Folk; ambient
- Length: 45:56
- Label: Bella Union
- Producer: Jørgen Træen

Susanne Sundfør chronology
Music for People in Trouble (2017)	Blómi (2023)

Singles from Blómi
- 1. "Alyosha" Released: 9 March 2023; 2. "Leikara Ljóð" Released: 22 March 2023; 3. "Blómi" Released: 11 October 2023

Blómi (transl. To Bloom) is the sixth studio album by Norwegian singer-songwriter Susanne Sundfør. It was released on 28 April 2023, by Bella Union. Sundfør dedicated the album to her family, particularly to her daughter and her grandfather, theologian and linguist Kjell Aartun. The album was supported by two singles: "Alyosha" and "Leikara Ljóð", both released in March 2023.

== Background and release ==
In an August 2018 interview, Sundfør revealed that she started the writing for the record; she said she was "see[ing] a lot of red" but clarified that it was not about apocalypse. She also stated that her upcoming sixth studio album would continue the sound developed on her fifth album Music for People in Trouble, in which she returned to her roots as a folk singer-songwriter.

The album's title comes from the Old Norse word blómi, which translates "to bloom". Alongside album's announcement, the songs "Alyosha" and "Leikara Ljóð" were released as a double single on 28 February 2023. The former was released as a single on 9 March, while the latter on 22 March.

== Critical reception ==
Professional ratings
Aggregate scores
Source	Rating
Metacritic	88/100
Review scores
Source	Rating
AllMusic	4.5/5 stars
The Arts Desk	5/5 stars
The Guardian	4/5 stars
Slant Magazine	4/5 stars

Writing for AllMusic, Timothy Monger claimed that, "Despite its arcane references and philosophical nature, Blómi remains approachable and is often quite moving. That Sundfør continues to make such consistently challenging music and be justly rewarded for it is its own small miracle, and with Blómi she reaches yet another career high."

== Track listing ==
All tracks are written by Susanne Sundfør except "Leikara Ljóð", written by Sundfør and Jørgen Træen. All tracks are produced by Træen.

Blómi track listing
No.	Title	Length
1.	"Orð Vǫlu"	3:47
2.	"Ashera's Song"	3:44
3.	"Blómi"	4:59
4.	"Rūnā"	4:46
5.	"Fare Thee Well"	4:23
6.	"Leikara Ljóð"	6:47
7.	"Alyosha"	5:31
8.	"Ṣānnu Yārru Lī"	5:44
9.	"Náttsǫngr"	3:49
10.	"Orð Hjartans"	2:26
Total length:		45:56

== Charts ==
Chart performance for Blómi
Chart (2023)	Peak position
Norwegian Albums (VG-lista)	2
UK Album Downloads (OCC)	31
UK Independent Albums (OCC)	31

== Release history ==
Release dates and formats for Blómi
Region	Date	Format	Label	Ref.
Various	28 April 2023	CD; digital download; LP; streaming	Bella Union	
