= Take One (Susanne Sundfør album) =

Live album by Susanne Sundfør
- Released: 10 March 2008
- Studio: Your Favorite Music (Bergen, Norway)
- Genre: Folk pop
- Length: 39:31
- Label: Your Favorite Music
- Producer: Susanne Sundfør; Geir Luedy

Susanne Sundfør chronology
Susanne Sundfør (2007)	Take One (2008)	The Brothel (2010)

Take One is a live album by Norwegian singer-songwriter Susanne Sundfør, released on 10 March 2008 through Your Favorite Music. The album consists of new, acoustic recordings of the tracks from Sundfør's self-titled debut album, with only "Morocco" being taken out and replaced with an interlude. The release of the album comes upon the request of many who have wanted to hear the songs as they were originally composed and performed at the beginning of Sundfør's career. Unlike the debut album in which she was supported by her band, Sundfør is the only musician on the album, which consists solely of her voice and piano or guitar.

As the album's title suggests, all the songs on Take One were recorded in a single take in the order of the track listing. The artwork of the album is an illustration based on a photo by Lars K. Lande.

== Track listing ==
All tracks are written by Susanne Sundfør, except where noted.

No.	Title	Length
1.	"I Resign"	3:59
2.	"The Waves"	1:58
3.	"Dear John"	3:35
4.	"Interlude"	2:22
5.	"Moments"	4:20
6.	"Gravity"	4:34
7.	"Walls"	4:12
8.	"Torn to Pieces (On Roses)" (writers: Sundfør, Janemil Kolstø)	3:55
9.	"The Dance" (writers: Sundfør, Kolstø)	3:40
10.	"Day of the Titans"	4:44
11.	"After You Left"	2:12
Total length:		39:31

== Personnel ==
- Susanne Sundfør – vocals
- Geir Luedy – production
- Kamikaze Media AS – artwork
