= White Foxes =

Single by Susanne Sundfør

from the album The Silicone Veil
- Released: 24 February 2012
- Genre: Electronic
- Length: 4:16
- Label: Sonnet Sound
- Songwriter(s): Susanne Sundfør
- Producer(s): Susanne Sundfør; Lars Horntveth

Susanne Sundfør singles chronology
"Turkish Delight" (2011)	"White Foxes" (2012)	"The Silicone Veil" (2012)

Music video
- "White Foxes" on YouTube

"White Foxes" is a song recorded by Norwegian singer-songwriter Susanne Sundfør. It was released on 24 February 2012 as the lead single from her third studio album, The Silicone Veil (2012).

== Release ==
"White Foxes" was released as the lead single from Sundfør's third studio album, The Silicone Veil (2012). It quickly became the most downloaded song on iTunes in Norway. Its accompanying music video was filmed over two days in Stockholm and its surrounding forests, and detailed four different stories connected by a common theme – a fox.

== Composition ==
According to Sundfør, "White Foxes" is a love song about "wanting to be peaceful." She stated that, to her, the most idealistic place to cleanse oneself is in the middle of nowhere, where the only thing one can see is snow and white foxes. Sundfør originally wrote the song for the Norwegian-Swedish film, Verden Venter (2014). The song was produced by Sundfør and Lars Horntveth.

While writing the song, Sundfør developed what she calls a "basic melody and basic chords." The song opens with a "dark piano melody" that comes to include "menacing vocals." Luke Slater of the BBC characterized it as an "invasively electronic track" that features soaring vocals accompanied by "meaty synthesisers and heavy electronics." IndieWire's Daniel D'Amours described the song as "pretty spiritual," as "most of its lyrics talk about the apocalypse, love, faith, death, earth, and everything in between." Pitchfork noted the presence of a "foggy bassline" as "the drum line lopes steady behind" Sundfør's "high and tense" voice.

== Critical reception ==
The song received highly positive reviews from music critics, with most highlighting Sundfør's voice. Pitchfork awarded the song with their "Best New Track" label, with Katherine St. Asaph stating: "Her vocal pirouettes and lyrics ("I wish to God that the earth would turn cold/ And all the pretty tulips would disappear") could have wandered in from a grief ballad, but the chorus's blooming synths and the electric-drill bridge suggest a tale far more contemporary and no less haunting." IndieWire named it as their "Song of the Week", with Daniel D'Amours noting that the song was "well orchestrated, creatively written and beautifully sung," further stating: "I'd never heard Susanne Sundfør's name not too long ago, but now it's one I'm unlikely to forget." Flux referred to it as a "majestic song" that possesses "rhythm and beats on the track coupled with the electronic blips and blurts are as delicious and catchy as they are complex" Luke Slater of the BBC opined that "White Foxes" featured Sundfør "at her most versatile." Glamour's Jason Lamphier added that Sundfør's voice "really gives 'White Foxes' its power, as it is filled with high-strung tension that perfectly complements the song's elusive lyrics," and later went on to call the song's chorus "nothing short of glorious". Out named it the 33rd best song of 2012.

== In popular culture ==
In 2013, the song was used in a trailer for the BBC Police procedural television series, Line of Duty. In 2020, the song was used in the opening credits for the Amazon Prime Video documentary series, Ted Bundy: Falling for a Killer.

== Track listing ==
Digital download

1. "White Foxes" – 4:16

Remixes digital EP

1. "White Foxes" – 4:16
2. "White Foxes" (Big Black Delta Mix) – 3:34
3. "White Foxes" (Maps Remix) – 5:40
4. "White Foxes" (Kleerup & Enochson Remix) – 3:47
5. "White Foxes" (Susanne Sundfør Remix) – 5:01

CD

1. "White Foxes" (Radio Edit) – 4:03
2. "White Foxes" (Maps Remix) – 5:40
3. "White Foxes" (Maps Remix Radio Edit) – 4:15
4. "White Foxes" (Kleerup & Enochson Remix) – 3:25
5. "White Foxes" (Album Version) – 4:21

== Charts ==
Chart (2012)	Peak position
Norway (VG-lista)	19
