= Fade Away (Susanne Sundfør song) =

Single by Susanne Sundfør

from the album Ten Love Songs
- Released: 24 October 2014
- Genre: Art pop; synth-pop; Electropop
- Length: 3:18
- Label: Warner Music Norway
- Songwriter(s): Susanne Sundfør
- Producer(s): Susanne Sundfør

Susanne Sundfør singles chronology
"The Silicone Veil" (2012)	"Fade Away" (2014)	"Delirious" (2015)

Music video
- "Fade Away" on YouTube

"Fade Away" is a song by Norwegian singer-songwriter Susanne Sundfør from her fourth studio album Ten Love Songs (2015). It was released as the first single from the album on 24 October 2014. The music video for the single was released on 3 December.

== Background and composition ==
The song deals with the theme of a breakup between lovers. In an interview with MusicOMH, Susanne said "It is personal, but at the same time it’s not. I read literature where I can connect. Everything I write I want to be from a perspective where other people can understand it. Love is pastiche. Love is such a cliché" in response to a question about whether the song is written primarily based on her personal experience.

== Critical reception ==
Michael Hann of The Guardian reviewed "The way the bass hook in Fade Away, a straight pinch from scores of dancefloor hits before, is kept stiff and hard seems to symbolise a mood of thwarted desire." Oda Faremo Lindholm of Dagsavisen described "Fade Away is a Duran Duran-style track that gives a better idea of how the rest of the album will develop. Sundfør has definitely popped up, with a clear anchoring in a very melodic 80s expression, where layer-heavy synths and dark electric drums drive the music forward."

== Track listing ==
Fade Away – Single
No.	Title	Length
1.	"Fade Away"	3:18

== Charts ==
Chart (2014)	Peak position
Norway (VG-lista)	25
