= Toy (Norwegian band) =

Norwegian electronic music duo

- Origin: Bergen, Norway
- Genres: Electropop
- Years active: 2002–present
- Labels: Smalltown Supersound; Telle Records
- Members: Jørgen Træen; Alisdair Stirling
- Website: Toy on Myspace

Toy (established 2002 in Bergen, Norway) is an electronic duo formed by musician and producer Jørgen Træen from Bergen and the Bergen-based composer Alisdair Stirling originally from London.

== Biography ==
Toy released the single Rabbit Pushing Mower/Valley Cars (2002) as a vinyl seven inch on Telle Records described by the BBC as an amusing cream puff of a tune. The next single was released on the label Smalltown Supersound, Sedan Through Tunnel/Decorama. Both of these singles was sold out quickly. The debut album by the duo Toy (2006), was the released on Smalltown Supersound, and received brilliant criticism. The track "Rabbit Pushing Mower" opened their friend Annie`s DJ Kicks mix album for Studio K7 (2005). Jørgen Træen runs Duper Studios in Bergen together with Yngve Sætre, where they collaborates with the likes of Röyksopp, Datarock and Bjørn Torske. Træen is a highly recognized producer that has produced albums for Sondre Lerche, Magnet and Jaga Jazzist, among others. He also has his own solo project 'Sir Dupermann' on Smalltown Supersound. Although a Londoner Stirling has his roots in Bergen where he is the driving force behind the Bergen pop workshop/collective 'House of Hiss'.

In a review of Norwegian music flowering outside Norway, Nick Sylvester of the Pitchfork states:

- "09. Toy: Sedar Through Tunnel (Smalltown Supersound) - Most people are hearing about Toy from Annie's DJ-Kicks mix, which opens with Toy's "Rabbit Pushing Mower" track from way back, issued as a seven-inch on one of Bergenite Mikel Telle's labels. I had said earlier my whole project with Norwegian music, at least at first, was to find songs that sound like Röyksopp's "Poor Leno"—cold, lonely pop, bedroom danceparty shit (though "Leno" killed Webster Hall when the boys came through). This track comes pretty damn close to the target sound, in no small part due to the haze of vocal samples, much like the Field's Things Keep Falling Down EP on Kompakt this year."

... Another statement is:

- "Prozac-flavoured glory" (BBC radio 3)

... and:

- "Sounds like a lot of fun being in Toy" (4/5, DJ Magazine)

== Discography ==
- 2005: Toy (Smalltown Supersound)
- 2006: Celebrity (Toy Remix) (12" single with Max Sedgley, released by Sunday Best Recordings)
- 2007: Half Baked Alaska (Smalltown Supersound)
- 2015: 40* 44* 34* (Smalltown Supersound)
