= The Brothel =

Studio album by Susanne Sundfør
- Released: 15 March 2010
- Studio: Pooka Studio
- Genres: Art-folk; electropop
- Length: 44:52
- Labels: EMI Norway; Grönland
- Producer: Lars Horntveth

Susanne Sundfør chronology
Take One (2008)	The Brothel (2010)	A Night at Salle Pleyel (2011)

Singles from Susanne Sundfør
- 1. "The Brothel" Released: 29 January 2010; 2. "It's All Gone Tomorrow" Released: 4 June 2010; 3. "Turkish Delight" Released: 12 August 2011

The Brothel is the second studio album by Norwegian musician Susanne Sundfør, released on 15 March 2010 in Norway, through EMI Music Norway and Grönland Records. The album sees a shift from the piano driven pop from previous releases towards a more ambitious and electronic sound.

The Brothel was a critical and commercial success in Norway, spending 30 weeks in the Norwegian album charts and becoming platinum certified and the best-selling album in Norway in 2010. It also won Sundfør a Norwegian Grammy award for "best composer" as well as a nomination for "best lyrics".

== Track listing ==
All tracks are written by Susanne Sundfør, except where noted.

No.	Title	Length
1.	"The Brothel"	6:15
2.	"Lilith"	3:35
3.	"Black Widow"	3:16
4.	"It's All Gone Tomorrow"	6:07
5.	"Knight of Noir"	5:02
6.	"Turkish Delight"	4:48
7.	"As I Walked out One Evening" (writers: Sundfør, Lars Horntveth)	3:18
8.	"O Master"	4:21
9.	"Lullaby"	4:48
10.	"Father Father"	3:22
Total length:		44:52

== Credits and personnel ==
Credits adapted from the liner notes of The Brothel.

=== Locations ===
- Recorded at Pooka Studio
- Vocals recorded at Tomba Emmanuelle
- Drums and strings recorded at Malabar Studios
- Mixed at Duper Studio
- Mastered at Cutting Room Studios

=== Personnel ===
- Susanne Sundfør – vocals, arrangements, piano, Fender Rhodes synthesizers, vibraphone, glockenspiel, marimba, sansula, drum programming, string arrangements, tambourine
- Lars Horntveth – production, arrangements, lap steel guitar, electric and acoustic guitars, bass guitar, baritone guitar, synth bass, bass clarinet, vibraphone, marimba, synthesizers, marxophone, percussion, kokle, water harp, piano, drum programming, strings arrangements, recording
- Morten Qvenild – synthesizer
- Gard Nilssen – drums
- Frode Larsen – violin
- Øyvind Fossheim – violin
- Nora Taksdal – viola
- Emery Cardas – cello
- Hans Petter Bang – contrabass
- Erik Johannessen – trombone, tuba
- Heming Valebjørg – snare drum, timpani
- Martin Horntveth – additional drum programming, orchestral bass drum, cymbals
- Jørgen Træen – additional drum programming and editing, mixing
- Helge Sten – vocal recording (tracks 1–3, 8–10)
- Alex Kloster-Jensen – drums and strings recording
- Björn Engelmann – mastering
- Kristin Austreid – artwork

== Certifications ==
Region	Certification	Certified units/sales
Norway (IFPI Norway)	2× Platinum	40,000^{‡}
^{‡} Sales+streaming figures based on certification alone.
