= Christine Sandtorv =

Norwegian musician (born 1976)

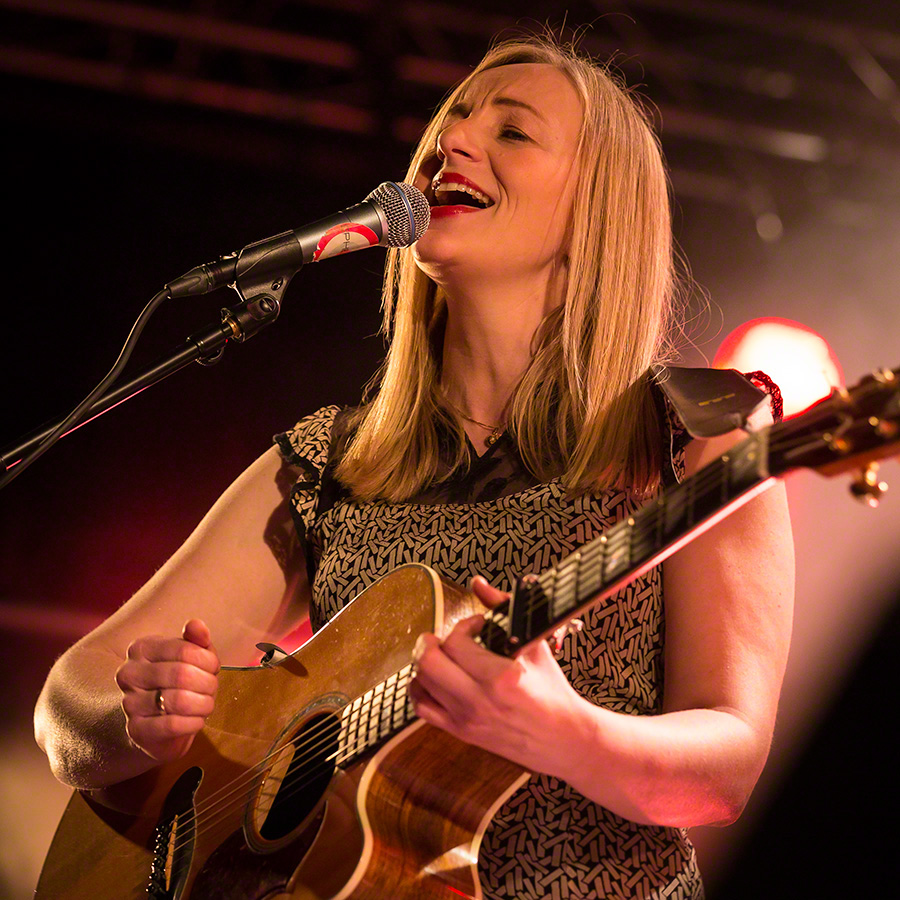
Christine Sandtorv at Parkteatret, 2016.

Christine Sandtorv (born 1976) is an artist from Bergen, Norway. She has won five Spellemann Awards, three of them as a solo artist.

== Career ==
Sandtorv started the music group Ephemera in 1994 together with Inger-Lise Størksen and Jannicke Larsen. All members handled vocals, guitar and songwriting, and Sandtorv and Larsen also handled keyboards. The group won two Spellemann Awards.

Sandtorv made her debut as a solo artist in 2006 with the album First Last Dance. She then made a series of children's albums called Stjerneteller, which consisted of the standalone albums Godnattsanger (2009), Gullamanter (2012), Dinomaur (2014), Klokvarm (2016) and Automagisk (2021). Three of the albums earned her further Spellemann Awards in the children's music category, first in 2012, then in 2014 and again in 2021.

Sandtorv also released several singer-songwriter albums; I Mellom Skyer (2017), Hei menneske (2020) and Lyden av et år (2022).
