= Susanne Sundfør =

Norwegian singer-songwriter and producer (born 1986)

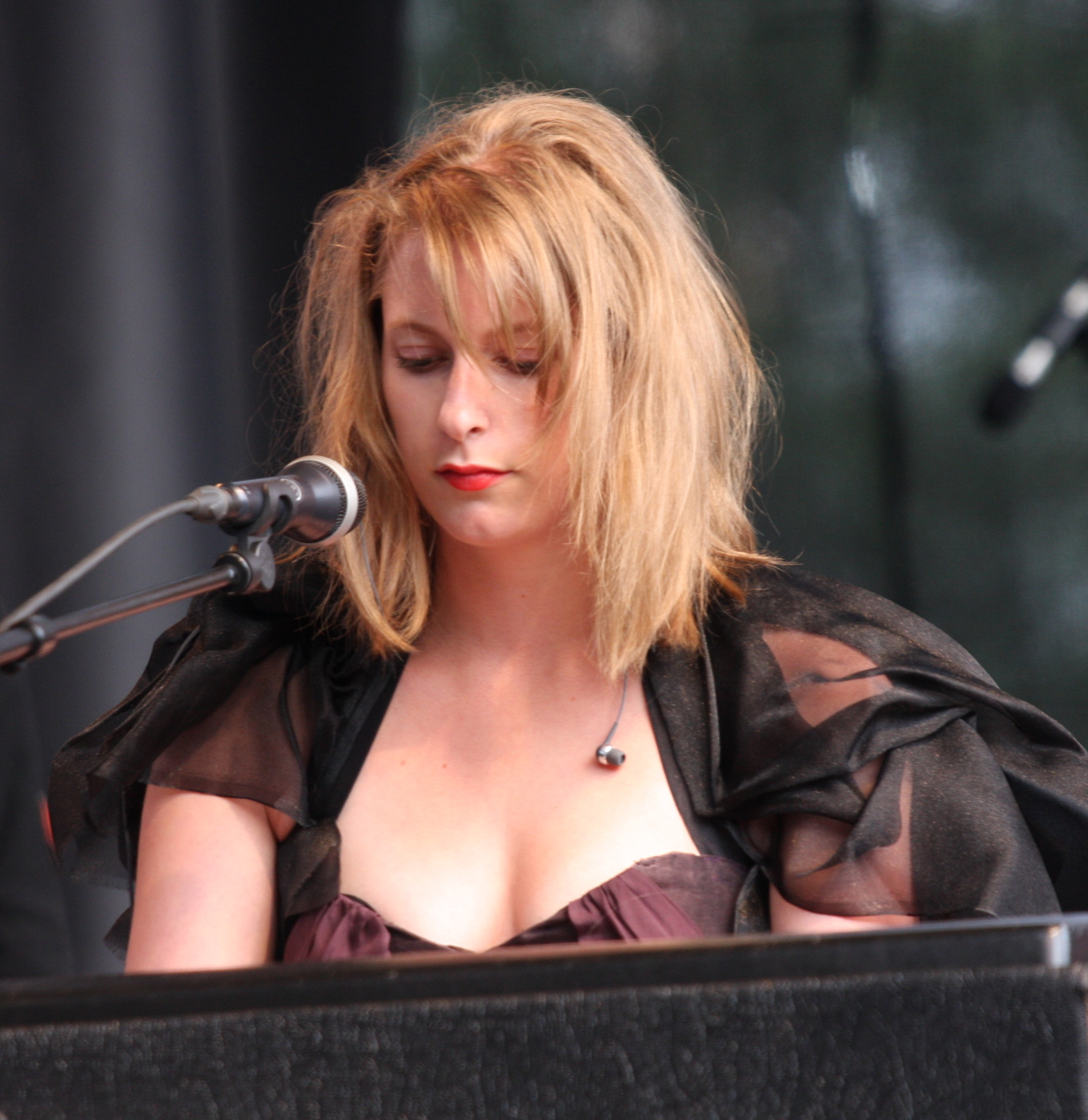
- Sundfør performing in Stavanger, 2010
- Born: 19 March 1986 (age 40); Haugesund, Norway
- Occupations: Singer-songwriter; record producer
- Spouse: André Roligheten (m. 2022)
- Children: 1
- Relatives: Kjell Aartun (grandfather)
- Musical career
- Genres: Art pop; electronic; folk; experimental pop
- Instruments: Vocals; piano; guitar; synthesizer; keyboards
- Years active: 2005–present
- Labels: EMI; Sonnet Sound; Warner; Bella Union
- Website: susannesundfor.com

Susanne Aartun Sundfør (Norwegian pronunciation: [sʉˈsànːə ˈòːɣtʉːn ˈsʉ̀nføːɣ] (local Haugesund dialect; [sʉˈsɑ̀nːə ˈɔ̀ʈːʉːn ˈsʉ̀nføːr] in Urban East ("standard") Norwegian); born 19 March 1986) is a Norwegian singer-songwriter and record producer. Born and raised in Haugesund, Sundfør started touring in 2005.

Susanne Sundfør (2007), her self-titled debut studio album, reached number three on the Norwegian album chart. It was followed by Take One in 2008, a live album consisting of songs from her debut. Her second studio album, The Brothel, was released in 2010, peaking at number one in Norway and becoming the best-selling album of that year. The album saw a shift from the piano-driven pop of previous releases towards a more ambitious and electronic direction; its title track reached number two on the Norwegian singles charts, the highest of Sundfør's career. In 2011, she released a live instrumental album composed solely of synthesizers, A Night at Salle Pleyel, serving as a commission piece.

Her third studio album, The Silicone Veil (2012), topped the Norwegian album chart and received critical acclaim. Her international breakthrough came in 2015 with her fourth studio album, Ten Love Songs, which saw Sundfør experimenting with an electronic dance pop sound. The album reached number one and garnered universal acclaim. Her fifth studio album Music for People in Trouble (2017) represented a departure from the electronic-driven sound of previous records in favor of a return to her roots as a folk singer-songwriter. The album reached number one in Norway as well, making it her fourth consecutive album to achieve this feat. Her sixth album Blómi was released in 2023.

== Early life ==
Sundfør was born in Haugesund on 19 March 1986. She is the granddaughter of theologian and linguist Kjell Aartun. After attending a music high school, she began making music as a hobby. She started playing music when she was six; "I would go to these classes where we would just sing and play the tambourine. You know, it wasn't really serious, but I really liked it so I started playing the violin when I was eight, then taking piano lessons when I was nine, and then singing lessons when I was twelve. So I was playing music at an early stage, but I didn't really take it that seriously. I wasn't practicing that much or anything. Then I went to a music high school, and I guess that's what you'd call my education in music."

Sundfør also studied English and art at the University of Bergen.

== Career ==
=== 2005–2007: Career beginnings and Susanne Sundfør ===
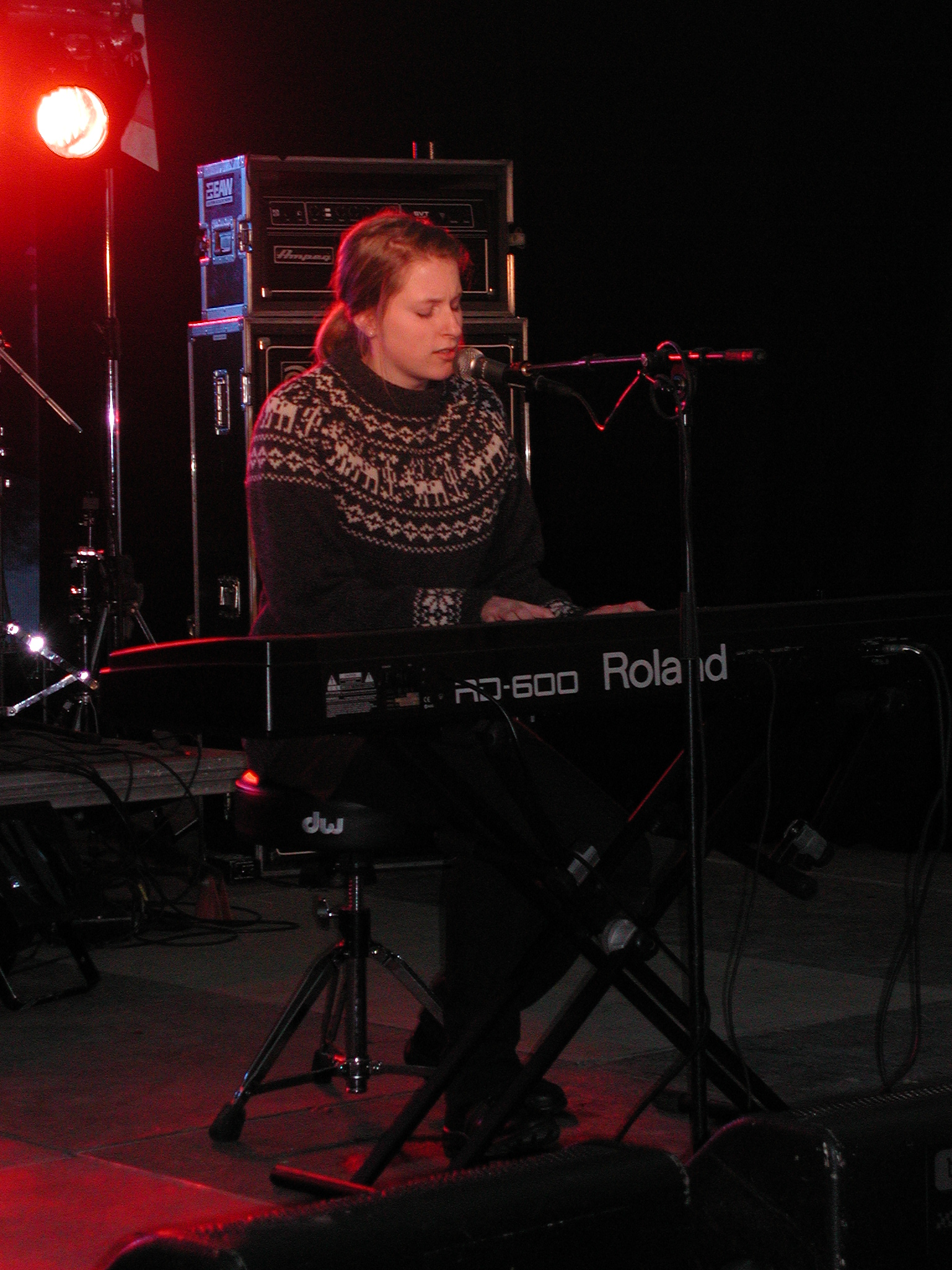
Sundfør performing in Tromsø, 2006

Sundfør rose to fame in her homeland in 2005, when she toured Norway opening for English singer Tom McRae. In 2006, she joined Norwegian band Madrugada on tour, performing their song "Lift Me", a duet the band originally recorded in the studio with singer Ane Brun. In November, she released her debut single "Walls", which would climb to number three on the Norwegian singles chart. Her self-titled debut studio album was released in March 2007 and peaked at number three on the Norwegian album chart.

=== 2008–2009: Take One ===
Susanne Sundfør was followed by the 2008 album Take One, consisting of acoustic versions of songs from her debut album. Although perhaps not immediately apparent to the listener, it is technically a live album - Take One was recorded in one take. Sundfør considers it to be "kind of like a remix album. Like if you have an album of just remixes of an earlier record you made, that's how I see it. So I don't really see it as an album like the other ones." That same year, Sundfør covered Bob Dylan's "Masters of War" at Store Studio, NRK. The following month, she was awarded Spellemannprisen for Female Artist. She spurred nationwide debate when she accepted the award, stating her work represented her as an artist first, and a woman second, bringing into question whether the Spellemann board was acting archaically with such gender-specific awards. That same month, Sundfør appeared on Mette-Marit, Crown Princess of Norway's album Sorgen og Gleden (English: The Sorrow and the Joy), with the Norwegian folk-tune psalm "Ingen Vinner Frem til Den Evige Ro" (English: "No One Reaches the Eternal Calm") by Lars Linderot and Gustav Jensen. Later in 2008, Sundfør moved to Oslo.

=== 2010–2011: The Brothel ===
In 2010, her second studio album The Brothel was released to critical acclaim in Norway and ended up becoming the best-selling album of the year. The album saw a shift from the piano driven pop from previous releases towards a more ambitious and electronic sound. Sundfør described it as a "conceptual album with both quite acoustic and electronic soundscapes." Dagbladet wrote that Sundfør was so good that other young Norwegian artists would start crying when hearing her—both because she is several leagues above them, but also because her music is so moving and beautiful. It was at this time that Sundfør decided to commit to music as a profession. She said in a 2013 interview, "I think I only decided that this is something that I wanted to spend my entire life doing after I released The Brothel, because that was the first time I really felt like I had 'found' a sound." Later that year, Sundfør briefly joined the band Hypertext, and they released their second album Astronaut Kraut!. She also appeared that year on folk/rock band Real Ones' single "Sister to All".

In 2011, she provided vocals on the title track from Nils Petter Molvær's album Baboon Moon. She also released an instrumental album, A Night at Salle Pleyel. The album is a live recording of a specially commissioned piece for the Oslo Jazz Festival's 25th anniversary. Sundfør composed it solely of synthesizers with a team of four keyboardists chosen by her: Ådne Meisfjord, Morten Qvenild, Øystein Moen and Christian Wallumrød. Sundfør considers the album to be more of a side project from her main project.

=== 2012–2013: The Silicone Veil ===
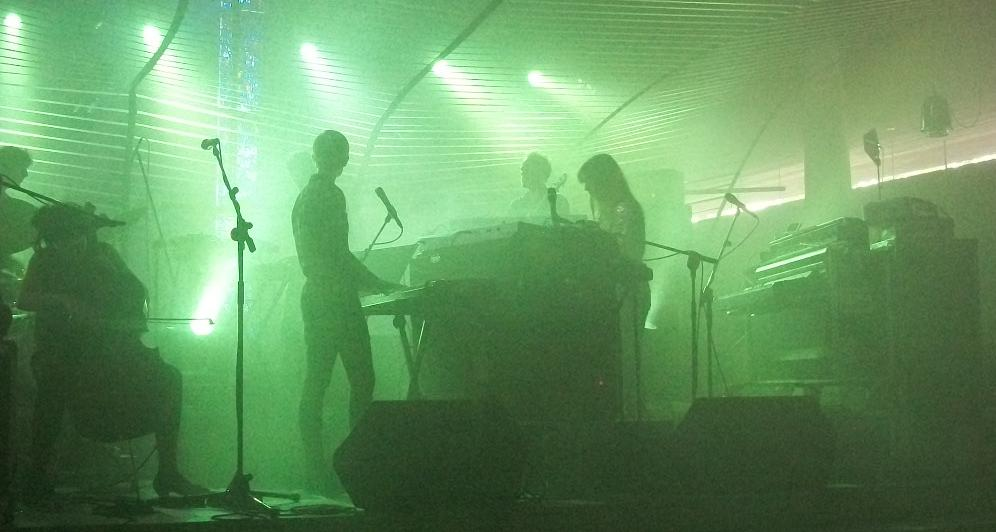
Sundfør and her band performing at Steinkjerfestivalen in Steinkjer Municipality, 2012

In 2012, Sundfør released the critically acclaimed "White Foxes", which served as the lead single to her third studio album The Silicone Veil, which is also Sundfør's first album to be released in the UK. The album received highly positive reviews from music critics internationally, and was a commercial success in Norway, debuting at number one on the album chart. Later that year, her collaboration with Norwegian musician Morten Myklebust on the single "Away" was released. On 6 December, she released a collaboration with the Norwegian electronic duo Röyksopp, "Running to the Sea". They performed the song at Lydverket on 28 November 2012, as well as a cover of "Ice Machine" by Depeche Mode. A studio version of "Ice Machine" was later featured on the duo's compilation album, Late Night Tales: Röyksopp (2013), and "Running to the Sea" was later featured on the duo's fifth studio album, The Inevitable End (2014).

Sundfør collaborated with French electronic band M83 on the soundtrack for the 2013 film Oblivion. The soundtrack was released on 9 April 2013 and features the title song "Oblivion" with Sundfør contributing the main vocals. Later that month, Sundfør's back catalog was released for the first time in the United Kingdom to positive critical response. The following month, Sundfør was featured on a single by Susanna alongside Siri Nilsen. The song was recorded by the three in 2012 for the Oya Container during the Øyafestivalen in Oslo, and was released worldwide on 24 May 2013 on streaming services and for digital download. In June 2013, Sundfør remixed Maps' single "A.M.A". She also produced, programmed, arranged, recorded, provided backing vocals and played the keyboards and autoharp on the indie pop band Bow to Each Other's debut album The Urge Dreams, marking her debut as a producer.

=== 2014–2017: Ten Love Songs and Music for People in Trouble ===
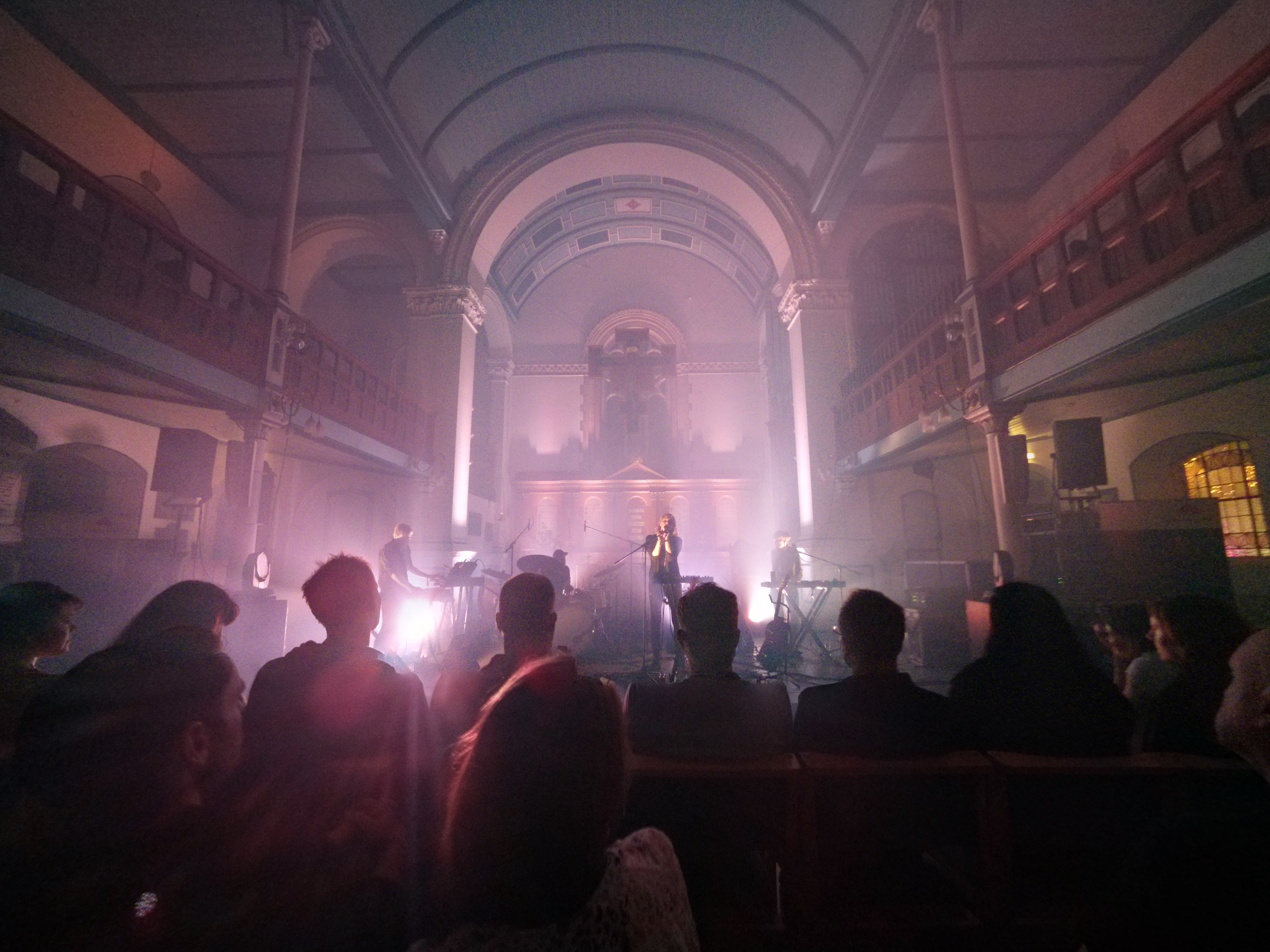
Sundfør performing at The Great Escape Festival, in St George's Church, Brighton, 2015

In October 2014, "Fade Away" was released. It served as the lead single to her fourth studio album Ten Love Songs, released in February 2015. The album was Sundfør's international breakthrough, and became a commercial and critical success, debuting at number one on the Norwegian album chart and garnering critical praise from music critics, with many listing it as one of the best albums of 2015. Sundfør began a European tour to coincide with the album in March at Scala, London. Sundfør briefly moved from Oslo to East London in 2015, where she wrote in Dalston most of the songs for her next album, although she has later moved back to Oslo.

On 6 June 2017, Sundfør announced her fifth studio album Music for People in Trouble would be released on 25 August 2017 through Bella Union, although it was later delayed to 8 September due to "unforeseen circumstances". The first single from the new album "Undercover" was released on the same day of the announcement. That same day, it was also announced Sundfør would embark on a tour in support of the album. The second single "Mountaineers" featuring John Grant was released on 24 July. Upon release, the album received highly positive reviews from music critics. It debuted at number one on the Norwegian album chart, making it her fourth consecutive album to achieve this feat. The album represents a departure from the electronic-driven sound of previous records in favor of a return to her roots as a folk singer-songwriter.

=== 2018–2023: Blómi ===
In 2020, Sundfør composed the score to the biographical film Self Portrait, about the late Norwegian artist Lene Marie Fossen.

On 23 February 2023, Sundfør released the lead singles "Alyosha" and "Leikara ljóð" and announced her sixth album Blómi, which was released on 28 April 2023. The album debuted at number two in Norway. The album was dedicated to her linguist grandfather Kjell Aartun and her recently born daughter.

=== 2026–Present: Revelations Of Divine Love ===
On August 7, 2026, Sundfør announced her next studio album, 'Revelations Of Divine Love', recorded with a british artist, Kit Downes. The announcement coincided with the release of the first single from the album, "I It Am". The second single "All Shall Be Well", along with its music video, was released on September 16, 2026. The album was released on October 2, 2026 to generally positive reviews.

== Musical style and influences ==
"I go on all these musical adventures but somehow always come back to the country and folk music. It's close to my heart, maybe because I listened to it in my childhood."

— Sundfør, 2017

Sundfør's music is varied, experimenting with various styles. Described as a mixture of experimental pop, electronica, folk, jazz, and classical music, the music she's released throughout the years also incorporates synth-pop, baroque music, electro-folk, electropop, dream pop, country, and avant-garde, while generally being labeled as an art pop musician. She has been compared to various artists, such as Kate Bush and Björk, although she's rejected these comparisons. She said the music she writes is heavily inspired by Carly Simon. Other influences she has cited include Joni Mitchell, Stevie Nicks, Carole King, Cat Stevens, Radiohead, Burial, Skream, Aphex Twin, Depeche Mode, Scott Walker, Philip Glass, Sylvia Plath, and Elton John, as well as traveling, books, films, music, and "life in general."

Sundfør grew up in a mix of country, folk rock and pop music, while in 2015 she started listening to early dubstep: "When creating music in a folk rock environment the creative process isn't really taking place in the studio like it is when you're working with electronica. This ability to use the studio as a creative tool in itself made me lean more and more towards electronic music." As a record producer who's known for standing up against sexism in the music industry, she mentioned that "being a woman in electronic music often means fighting against prejudices that male persons do the programming and the females do the singing."

== Personal life ==
Sundfør has stated that she is an atheist but that she "doesn't think science can explain everything that surrounds us," continuing: "Sometimes it's fun to imagine that there is a 'bigger' meaning, a connection, something we have not yet thought about and is expecting to reach a higher level of understanding. Sometimes the questions are more interesting than the answers."

In August 2020, Sundfør announced on Instagram that she was pregnant with her first child. She married jazz musician André Roligheten two years later, in summer 2022.

Sundfør is an advocate of regenerative agriculture and has produced an Instagram series on sustainable farming alongside chef Per Theodor Tørrissen, visual artist Johanne Log, and the Nybo Regenerative Farm.

=== Politics ===
Prior to the 2017 Norwegian General Election, Sundfør showed her support for the Socialist Left Party on Twitter, writing: "Vote for solidarity and protecting our planet. Vote against capitalism. It's the only humane future."

The drone outro in "The Sound of War" from 2017's Music for People in Trouble was inspired by a BBC report on Gaza. In November 2023, Sundfør performed at a "Songs for Gaza" fundraiser in Norway for Doctors Without Borders.

== Discography ==
=== Studio albums ===
List of studio albums, with selected chart positions
Title	Album details	Peak chart positions						Certifications
Title	Album details	NOR	BEL (FL)	SCO	SWE	UK	UK Indie	Certifications
Susanne Sundfør	Released: 19 March 2007; Label: Your Favourite Music, Warner Norway; Formats: CD, digital download, streaming	3	—	—	—	—	—	
The Brothel	Released: 12 March 2010; Label: EMI Norway; Formats: CD, LP, digital download, streaming	1	—	—	—	—	—	IFPI NOR: 2× Platinum
The Silicone Veil	Released: 23 March 2012; Label: EMI Norway; Formats: CD, LP, digital download, streaming	1	—	—	—	—	—	
Ten Love Songs	Released: 16 February 2015; Label: Warner Norway; Formats: CD, LP, digital download, streaming	1	—	—	47	78	—	IFPI NOR: Gold
Music for People in Trouble	Released: 8 September 2017; Label: Bella Union; Formats: CD, LP, digital download, streaming	1	124	51	—	93	—	IFPI NOR: Gold
Blómi	Released: 28 April 2023; Label: Bella Union; Formats: CD, LP, digital download, streaming	2	—	—	—	— (Note: Blómi did not enter the UK Albums Chart, but peaked at number 31 on the UK Album Downloads Chart.)	31	
Revelations of Divine Love	Released: 2 October 2026; Label: Bella Union; Formats: CD, LP, digital download, streaming	4	—	—	—	—	—	
"—" denotes a recording that did not chart or was not released in that territory.

=== Live albums ===
List of live albums, with selected chart positions
Title	Album details	Peak chart positions
Title	Album details	NOR
Take One	Released: 10 March 2008; Label: Your Favourite Music; Formats: CD, digital download, streaming	32
A Night at Salle Pleyel	Released: 18 November 2011; Label: EMI Norway; Formats: CD, LP, digital download, streaming	—
Music for People in Trouble: Live from the Barbican	Released: 29 November 2019; Label: Bella Union; Formats: CD, LP, digital download, streaming	—
"—" denotes a recording that did not chart or was not released in that territory.

=== Extended plays ===
List of extended plays, with selected details
Title	Details
Self Portrait Original Soundtrack - EP	Released: 10 January 2020; Label: Bella Union; Formats: Digital download, streaming

=== Singles ===
==== As lead artist ====
List of singles as lead artist, with selected chart positions, showing year released and album name
Title	Year	Peak chart positions	Certifications	Album
Title	Year	NOR	Certifications	Album
"Walls"	2006	3		Susanne Sundfør
"The Brothel"	2010	2		The Brothel
"It's All Gone Tomorrow"	2010	—		The Brothel
"Turkish Delight"	2011	—		The Brothel
"White Foxes"	2012	19		The Silicone Veil
"The Silicone Veil"	2012	—		The Silicone Veil
"Fade Away"	2014	25	IFPI NOR: Gold	Ten Love Songs
"Delirious"	2015	—		Ten Love Songs
"Kamikaze"	2015	—		Ten Love Songs
"Accelerate"	2015	—		Ten Love Songs
"Undercover"	2017	—		Music for People in Trouble
"Mountaineers" (featuring John Grant)	2017	—		Music for People in Trouble
"When the Lord"	2020	—		Self Portrait Original Soundtrack - EP
"Alyosha"	2023	—		Blómi
"Leikara ljóð"	2023	—		Blómi
"Blómi"	2023	—		Blómi
"I It Am" (with Kit Downes)	2026	—		Revelations of Divine Love
"—" denotes a recording that did not chart or was not released in that territory.

==== As featured artist ====
List of singles as featured artist, with selected chart positions, showing year released
Title	Year	Peak chart positions			Album
Title	Year	NOR	DEN	FRA	Album
"Sister to All" (Real Ones featuring Susanne Sundfør)	2010	—	—	—	First Night on Earth
"Kapitulera" (Timbuktu featuring Susanne Sundfør)	2011	12	—	—	Sagolandet
"Away" (Morten Myklebust featuring Susanne Sundfør)	2012	—	—	—	Morten Myklebust
"Oblivion" (M83 featuring Susanne Sundfør)	2013	—	—	114	Oblivion: Original Motion Picture Soundtrack
"Death Hanging" (Susanna featuring Susanne Sundfør)	2013	—	—	—	non-album single
"Running to the Sea" (Röyksopp featuring Susanne Sundfør)	2014	14	10	—	The Inevitable End
"Let Me In" (Kleerup featuring Susanne Sundfør)	2014	—	—	—	As If We Never Won
"Never Ever" (Röyksopp featuring Susanne Sundfør)	2016	22	—	—	Non-album single
"If You Want Me" (Röyksopp featuring Susanne Sundfør)	2022	—	—	—	Profound Mysteries
"Oh, Lover" (Röyksopp featuring Susanne Sundfør)	2022	—	—	—	Profound Mysteries II
"—" denotes a recording that did not chart or was not released in that territory.

=== Guest appearances ===
List of non-single guest appearances, with other performing artists, showing year released and album name
Title	Year	Other artist(s)	Album
"Ingen Vinner Frem Til Den Evige Ro"	2008	Mette-Marit, Crown Princess of Norway	Sorgen og gleden
"Baboon Moon"	2011	Nils Petter Molvær	Baboon Moon
"Ice Machine"	2013	Röyksopp	Late Night Tales: Röyksopp
"Save Me"	2014	Röyksopp	The Inevitable End
"For the Kids"	2016	M83	Junk
"Tobacco Road"	2019	Mercury Rev	Bobbie Gentry's The Delta Sweete Revisited
"The Mourning Sun"	2022	Röyksopp	Profound Mysteries
"Tell Him"	2022	Röyksopp	Profound Mysteries II
"Stay Awhile"	2022	Röyksopp	Profound Mysteries III

== Awards and nominations ==
2016: Berlin Music Video Awards, nominated in the Best Cinematography category for 'Accelerate'

== Notes ==
Awards
Preceded by Marit Larsen	Recipient of the female pop solo artist Spellemannprisen; 2007	Succeeded by Maria Mena
Preceded by Svein Berge / Torbjørn Brundtland	Recipient of the Spellemannprisen popular composer award 2010	Succeeded by Rolf Wallin
Preceded by Emilie Nicolas	Recipient of the pop artist Spellemannprisen; 2015	Succeeded by Aurora
Preceded by -	Recipient of the album Spellemannprisen; 2015	Succeeded by Aurora
Preceded by -	Recipient of the music producer Spellemannprisen; 2015/2016	Succeeded by Ole Torjus Hofvind
