= Sound Collective =

London-based music ensemble

- Music ensemble
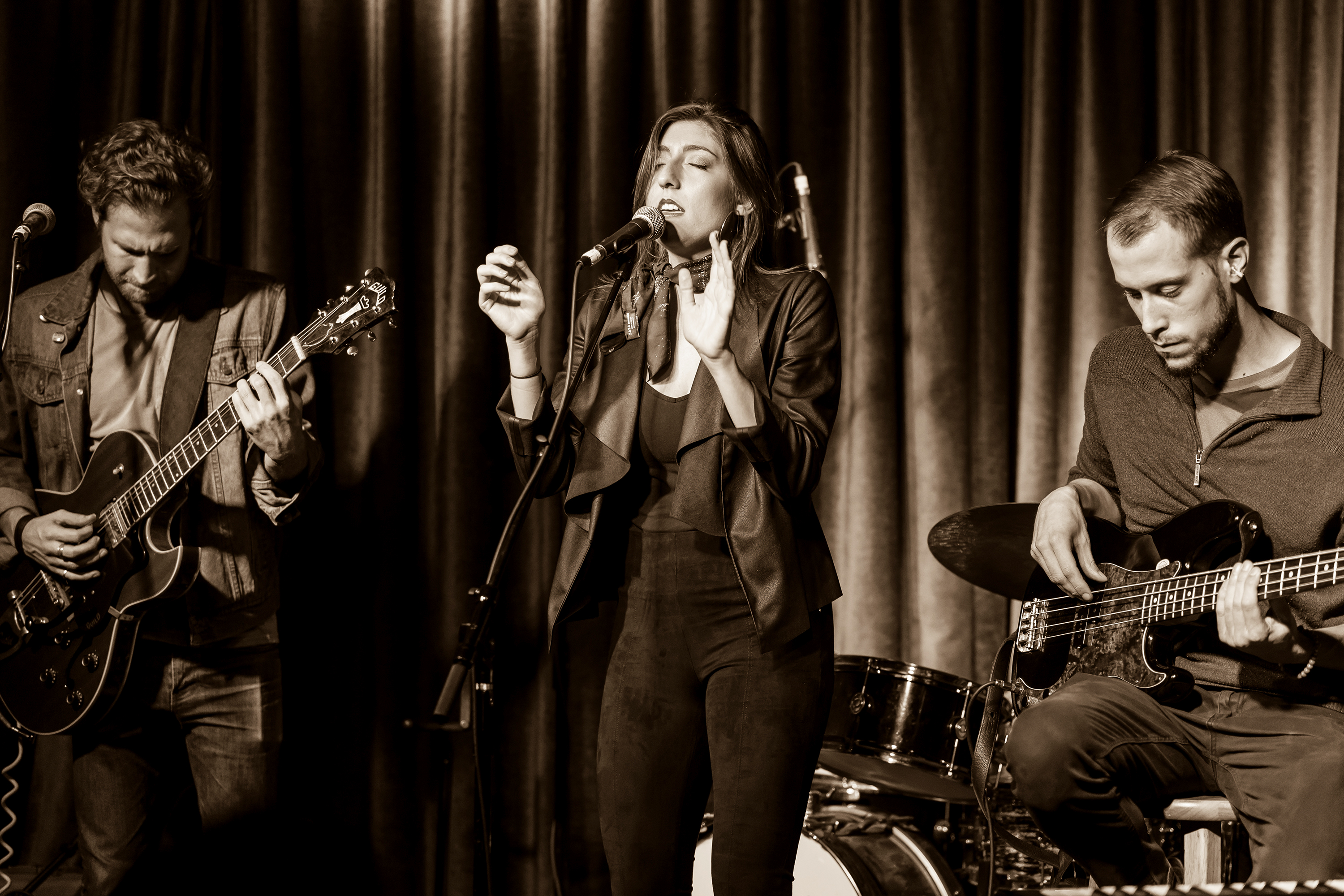
- Sound Collective at the Hotel Café, Hollywood, December 3, 2017
- Founded: 2003
- Location: London, United Kingdom

Sound Collective is a London-based professional music ensemble.

== History ==
Sound Collective, formed in 2003 was a home for classical musicians, who were hand-picked from the British orchestral, chamber and freelance scene.

Sometimes coming together as a chamber orchestra with conductor, but also formed as smaller chamber ensembles, they met just a few times each year to create bespoke performance and education projects.

The guiding principles behind the group were excellence in performance through adequate rehearsal time, intelligent programming, a democratic ethos in both choice of repertoire and rehearsal approach, and a commitment to communication with their audiences.
