= Poor Rich Ones =

Norwegian pop and rock band

- Origin: Bergen, Norway
- Genres: Rock, folk rock, pop
- Years active: 1989 – 2003,2015–present
- Labels: Rec 90/EMI
- Members: William Hut; Bjørn Bunes; Tor Sørensen; Eivind Kvamme; Bjarte Ludvigsen
- Past members: Espen Mellingen; Kjetil Gåsland

Poor Rich Ones (1989-2003) was a pop and rock band from Bergen, Norway, comprised by lead singer, songwriter and guitarist William Hut, keyboardist Bjørn Bunes, bassist Tor Sørensen, guitarists Eivind Kvamme, Espen Mellingen, and drummer Bjarte Ludvigsen ("blue").

Formed in 1994, the band released their debut album Naivety's Star in 1996 on the local label Rec 90. Q magazine described their style as "infinitely sad and nocturnal, yet uplifting rather than depressing", calling the band "Norway's own Radiohead".

After four successful album releases, including a final "best of" album after a United States tour, the band effectively dissolved in 2003. Although they have not broken up officially, the band's homepage states they have "no future plans". Vocalist William Hut has pursued a solo career, often assisted by ex-band colleague Bjørn Bunes. In 2015 the band reformed for a one-off gig, but have since continued playing shows every now and then.

== Honors ==
- Spellemannprisen 1997 in the class Rock for the album From the Makers of Ozium

== Discography ==
=== Albums ===
- Naivety's Star (1996)
- From the Makers of Ozium (1997)
- Happy Happy Happy (February 15, 2000)
- Joe Maynard's Favourites (2001)

=== EPs ===
- Soundtrack EP (Besteborgere) (1999)
- Bubble Bowling (1997)
- All Those Present/Drown EP

=== Singles ===
- "Mummy" (1995)
- "This Great Standing Still" (1996)
- "Fear of Losing" (1997)
- "Strong" (1997)
- "Anyway/Somehow" (1998)
- "Hunting High and Low" (1999)
- "Small Glimpse" (1999)
- "Old Age and Failures"

Awards
Preceded by Motorpsycho	Recipient of the Rock Spellemannprisen; 1997	Succeeded by Midnight Choir
