= Jørgen Træen =

Norwegian musician (born 1973)

- Born: Norway
- Genre: Electronica
- Occupations: Musician, music producer
- Instruments: Guitar, keyboards, bass guitar
- Label: Smalltown Supersound

Jørgen Træen also known by his stage name Sir Dupermann is a Norwegian record producer, musician (guitar, keyboards and bass guitar) and electronica artist from Bergen. He is best known for his work as a music producer and for the studio Duper Studio, which he runs together with Yngve Sætre.

== Career ==
Several Norwegian artists have recorded their albums at the Duper Studio. Among the artists he has collaborated with as a producer is Kaizers Orchestra, The National Bank (on both albums), Sondre Lerche (on the first three albums), Jaga Jazzist ( A Livingroom Hush), Poor Rich Ones (Naivety's Star) and Helén Eriksen (City Dust).

As a musician he is in and has been in bands and projects like noise band Golden Serenades, the pop band House of Hiss, Toy, Slut Machine, and Der Brief. In 2002 he released electronica album Sir Duperman under the stage name Sir Dupermann.

== Discography ==
- With Slut Machine
  - 1996: Slut Machine (SlutMachine)
- With Lars-Erik Ter Jung
  - 1999: 8.-10. December 1998 (Albedo)
- With Spunk
  - 2001: Filtered Through Friends (Rune Grammofon)
- With Sir Dupermann
  - 2002: Sir Dupermann (Smalltown Supersound)
- With Jaga Jazzist
  - 2002: A Livingroom Hush
- With Magnet
  - 2003: On Your Side (Ultimate Dilemma)
  - 2004: Lay Lady Lay (Ultimate Dilemma), feat. Gemma Hayes
- With Lars Horntveth
  - 2004: Pooka (Smalltown Supersound)
  - 2004: The Joker Maxi Single (Smalltown Supersound)
- With Sondre Lerche
  - 2004: Two Way Monologue (EMI Music Norway)
- With Ralph Myerz & The Jack Herren Band
  - 2004: Your New Best Friends (Emperor Norton)
- With Toy duo with Alisdair Stirling
  - 2006: Toy (Smalltown Supersound)
  - 2007: Half Baked Alaska (Smalltown Supersound)
- With Golden Serenades
  - 2007: Golden Serenades / Sewer Election (Roggbif Records)
  - 2009: Hammond Pops (+3DB Records)
- With Nils Martin Larsen
  - 2011: Endless Repeats (Spoon Train Audio)
- With Susanne Sundfør
  - 2012: The Silicone Veil
  - 2017: Music For People In Trouble
  - 2023: Blómi
