= Ephemera (band) =

Norwegian band

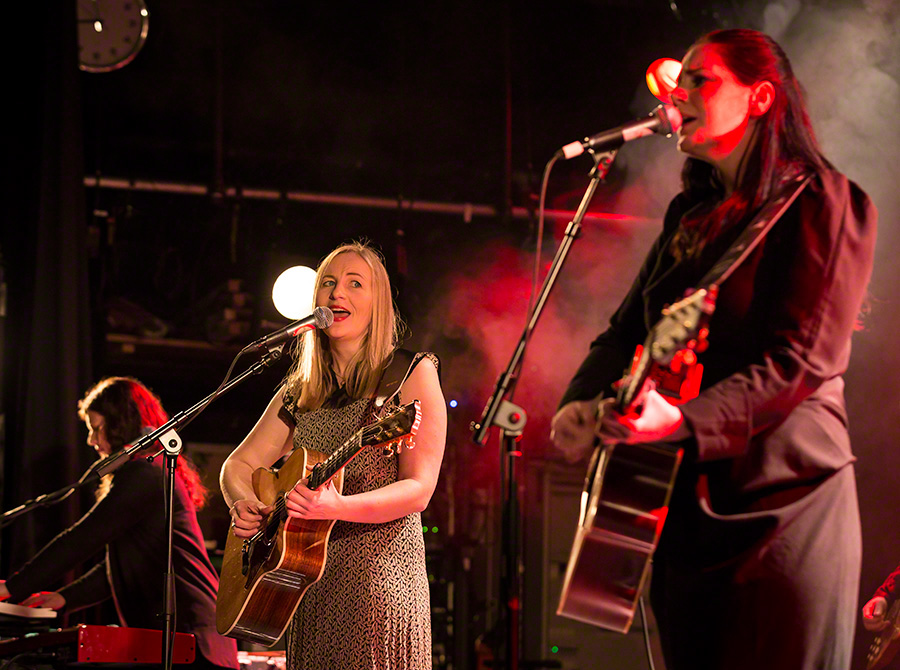
- Ephemera in concert at Parkteatret in Oslo (2016)

Background information
- Origin: Bergen, Norway
- Genres: Alternative rock, easy listening, electronic music
- Years active: Since 1994
- Labels: Ephemera Records
- Members: Christine Sandtorv; Jannicke Larsen; Inger Lise Størksen
- Website: ephemera.no

Ephemera is a Norwegian pop trio from Bergen. Formed in 1994, it consists of Christine Sandtorv, Inger-Lise Størksen and Jannicke Larsen.

== History ==
Their first album, Glue, was released in 1996.

After several years of touring, studying music, and writing new songs, a second album, Sun, was released in 2000. That album earned the band a Best Group nomination in the Spellemannprisen awards, Norway's equivalent of the Grammy Awards.

Three more albums were released across the next five years, and the band won the Spellemannprisen award in the category Best Pop Album for the album Balloons and Champagne (2002) and Air (2003).

The band was an essential part of the defining "Bergensbølgen" (The Bergen Wave) that heavily influenced Norwegian music and paved the way for a new international recognition of Norwegian music and up and coming artists. Ephemera earned a solid fan base in Northern Europe and in Asia, and they have been an immense inspiration for new Norwegian artists now seen on stages in Norway and around the world. Their music is also found in films, commercials and TV-series.

The band took a break in 2005 after extensive touring. The break however, was extended several times to give room for new professional careers and solo albums, in addition to family extensions. After two fully booked concerts in Oslo and Bergen in 2015 and 2016, the break finally seemed to reach an end.

Since 2017 they have spent time in studio with their long-time producer Yngve Saetre, and in June 2019 they released their new single MAGIC – the first taste of their new compositions.

=== Members ===
- Christine Sandtorv – vocal, guitar, keyboards, songwriter
- Jannicke Larsen – vocal, guitar, keyboards, percussion, songwriter
- Inger Lise Størksen – vocal, percussion, chimes, songwriter

=== Honors ===
- The Alarm Music Prize (2003)
- Spellemannprisen nominations (Best Pop Album for Sun in 2001, Balloons and Champagne in 2003)

=== Discography ===
- 1996: Glue
- 2000: Sun
- 2001: Balloons and Champagne
- 2003: Air
- 2005: Monolove

== See also ==
- List of all-female bands
- List of alternative-rock bands
- List of Norwegian musicians
- Music of Norway

Awards
Preceded by Savoy	Recipient of the Pop Band Spellemannprisen; 2002/2003	Succeeded by The National Bank
