= Susanne Sundfør (album) =

Studio album by Susanne Sundfør
- Released: 19 March 2007
- Genre: Folk pop
- Length: 50:10
- Label: Your Favourite Music
- Producer: Geir Luedy; Hans Petter Aaserud

Susanne Sundfør chronology
Susanne Sundfør (2007)	Take One (2008)

Singles from Susanne Sundfør
- 1. "Walls" Released: 29 November 2006

Susanne Sundfør is the debut studio album by Norwegian singer-songwriter Susanne Sundfør, released on 19 March 2007 through Your Favourite Music. The album reached number three on the Norwegian album chart and was supported by its lead single, "Walls", which also reached number three on the Norwegian singles chart. Sundfør described the record as "folk-inspired."

== Track listing ==
All tracks are written by Susanne Sundfør; all tracks produced by Geir Luedy, except where noted.

No.	Title	Length
1.	"I Resign"	4:20
2.	"The Waves"	0:55
3.	"Dear John,"	3:17
4.	"Walls" (producers: Luedy, Hans Petter Aaserud)	4:23
5.	"Gravity"	4:25
6.	"Moments"	4:36
7.	"The Dance"	3:23
8.	"Morocco" (producers: Luedy, Aaserud)	4:33
9.	"Torn to Pieces"	3:16
10.	"Day of the Titans"	5:02
11.	"After You Left"	12:00
Total length:		50:10

Notes

- "Morocco" features vocals from Odd Martin Skålnes
- The ending of "After You Left" contains a hidden track– an instrumental version of "The Dance"

== Personnel ==
Credits adapted from the album's liner notes.

- Susanne Sundfør – vocals, piano (tracks 1–4, 6, 9–11), acoustic guitar (track 7)
- Odd Martin Skålnes – vocals (track 8)
- Jarle Bernhoft – backing vocals
- Jonny Sjo – bass (tracks 4, 6, 7, 9)
- Vemund Stavenes – bass (tracks 1, 3, 8, 10)
- Ivar Thormodsæter – drums (tracks 1, 3, 4, 7, 8, 10)
- Tommy Kristiansen – guitar (tracks 1, 3, 4, 8)
- Morten Qvenild – synthesizer (tracks 9, 10), autoharp (track 10)
- Geir Luedy – electric guitar (track 8), hand claps, production
- Hans Petter Aaserud – hand claps, production (tracks 4, 8), mixing (tracks 4, 8)
- Angi Harley – violin
- Espen Lilleslåtten – violin
- Hillary Foster – violin
- Judith Starr – violin
- Julia Dibley – violin
- Siv Grønnli – violin
- Tor Jaran Apold – violin
- Ursula Muhlberger – violin
- Bergmund Waal Skaslien – viola
- Hans Gunnar Hagen – viola
- Ben Nation – cello
- Johan Sebastian Blum – cello
- Eivind Buene – strings arrangements, strings conductor
- Erlend Fauske – strings recording
- Espen Berg – mastering
- Kristin Austreid – artwork
