= List of Ekkofestival artists =

This is a list of artistic performers that have visited the international Ekkofestival in Bergen through the years.

== Ekkofestival bands and artists (in selection) ==
=== Years 2003 - 2007 ===
2003 (October 17–25)

- Lackluster
- Datarock
- Annie
- Brothomstates
- Skatebård

2004 (September 30 - October 3)

- Bjørn Torske
- Datarock
- Jeans Team
- Aavikko
- Andreas Tilliander
- Me At Sea
- Dub Tractor
- Mr Velcro Fastener
- Automat.piss.tool

2005 (October 20–23)

- Biosphere
- Mental Overdrive
- Moen meets Me At Sea
- ESG
- Bjørn Torske

No Ekkofestival 2006

2007 (August 23–26)

- Puma feat. Lasse Marhaug
- A Certain Ratio
- Datarock
- Me At Sea
- Sissy Wish
- Annie
- Skatebård
- Röyksopp

=== Years 2008 - 2011 ===
2008 (September 5–7)

- Zombie Zombie
- Mari Kvien Brunvoll
- Annie
- ESG
- Datarock
- Skatebård
- Planningtorock
- Automat.piss.tool.

2009 (September 24–26)

- Röyksopp
- Efterklang
- Karin Park
- Jonathan Johansson
- The Field
- Woolfy

2010 (October 15–23)

- Casiokids
- Kim Hiorthøy
- Moderat
- Lo-Fi-Fnk
- Vinnie Who

2011 (September 29 - October 1)

- Pierre Henry
- The Wombats
- Bjørn Torske
- Planningtorock
- Robert Henke
- White (Stian Westerhus & Øystein Moen) feat. Susanne Sundfør

=== Years 2012 - 2015 ===
2012 (October 22 - November 3)

- Todd Terje
- El Perro del Mar
- John Talabot
- GusGus
- Stian Westerhus
- Bjørn Torske

2013 (October 25 – November 2)

- Pantha Du Prince & The Bell Laboratory
- Holly Herndon
- Andrew Weatherall
- Jon Hopkins
- Lindstrøm
- Mykki Blanco
- Andrew Weatherall
- Vessels

2014 (October 17–25)

- Nils Frahm
- Future Brown
- The Haxan Cloak
- Shackleton

2015 (October 28–31)

- Max Cooper "Emergence"
- Kindness
- The Megaphonic Thrift
- East India Youth
