= Ekkofestival =

Music festival in Bergen, Norway

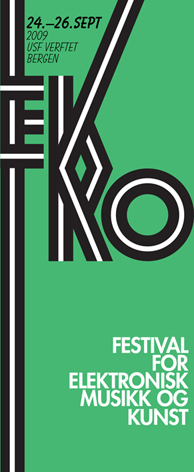
- Ekko 2009, logo.
- Status: Active
- Genre: Electronic dance music festival
- Date: Late October
- Begins: 26 October 2016
- Ends: 4 November 2016
- Frequency: Annually
- Venue: Østre
- Location: Bergen
- Country: Norway
- Years active: 2003 – present
- Website: www.ekko.no

The Ekkofestival, Ekko or Ekko - Bergen Electronic Music and Art Festival, is a music festival which takes place in Bergen, Norway in the fall every year.

== Biography ==
Ekko mainly focus on presenting electronic music and contemporary art, where the musical expressions encompasses a multitude of genres, with electronic music as the common denominator. The festival started in 2003, and it has grown substantially since the beginning.

During the years Ekko has presented over 400 artists and/or bands, and Ekko has been early in fronting many new artists. Artists like Skatebård, Jeans Team, Me At Sea, Annie, Booka Shade and Kleerup have all played at the festival, as well as established musicians like ESG, Puma, Lasse Marhaug, Biosphere, Stian Westerhus, Øystein Moen, Susanne Sundfør, and A Certain Ratio.

In 2009 the festival started the 24th and ended 26 September, and the venue is USF Verftet in Bergen. The line-up includes artists / bands like Röyksopp, Efterklang, Karin Park, Woolfy, The Field, Jonathan Johansson and many more. In addition the festival will present an extended visual art-program.

== Bands and artists (in selection) ==
2010 (15–23 October)

- Casiokids
- Kim Hiorthøy
- Moderat
- Lo-Fi-Fnk
- Vinnie Who

2011 (29 September – 1 October)

- Pierre Henry
- The Wombats
- Bjørn Torske
- Planningtorock
- Robert Henke
- White (Stian Westerhus & Øystein Moen) feat. Susanne Sundfør

2012 (22 October – 3 November)

- Todd Terje
- El Perro del Mar
- John Talabot
- GusGus
- Stian Westerhus
- Bjørn Torske

2013 (25 October – 2 November)

- Pantha Du Prince & The Bell Laboratory
- Holly Herndon
- Andrew Weatherall
- Jon Hopkins
- Lindstrøm
- Mykki Blanco
- Andrew Weatherall
- Vessels

2014 (17–25 October)

- Nils Frahm
- Future Brown
- The Haxan Cloak
- Shackleton

2015 (28–31 October)

== See also ==
- List of electronic music festivals
