= Damasiewicz =

Damasiewicz is a Polish surname. Notable people with the surname include:

- Julia Damasiewicz (born 2004), Polish kitesurfer
- Piotr Damasiewicz (born 1980), Polish composer and musician
