= Dominik Wania =

Polish pianist and composer (born 1981)

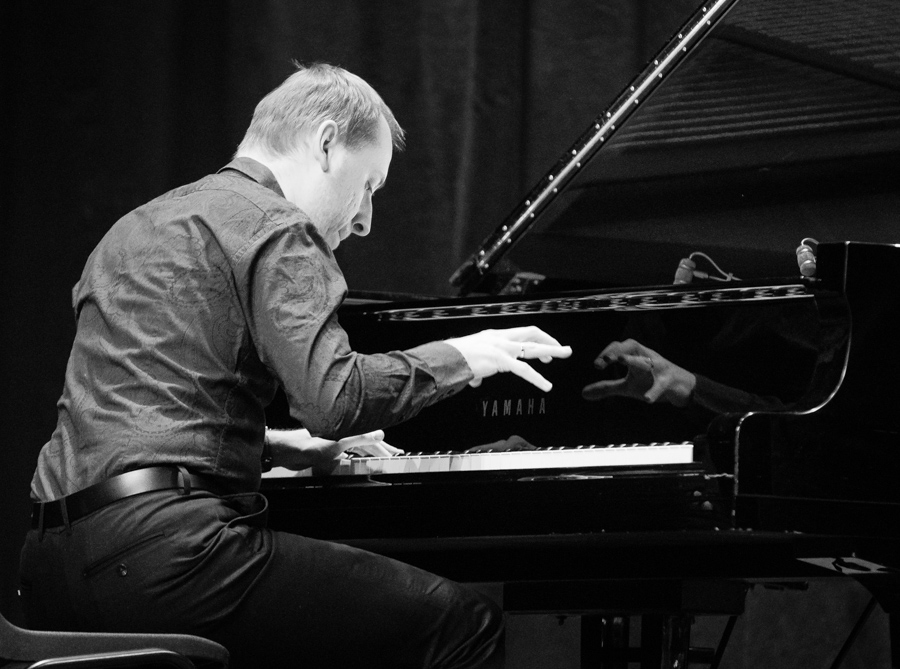
- Dominik Wania playing Piano

Background information
- Born: 24 November 1981 (age 44)
- Origin: Poland
- Genres: Jazz
- Occupations: Musician, composer
- Instrument: Piano
- Labels: For Tune, ECM Records
- Website: www.jazzfest-bonn.de/en/dominik-wania-trio

Dominik Wania (born 24 November 1981 in Sanok, Poland) is a Polish pianist and composer.

== Biography ==
Wania started his piano studies at age three. In 2005 he graduated from the Academy of Music in Kraków, Poland, where he was an honors music student studying classical piano performance. In 2006 he was awarded The Helena Foundation Presidential Scholarship at New England Conservatory of Music in Boston where he pursued Master of Music degree in Jazz Performance. While at NEC Dominik Wania studied with Danilo Perez, Jerry Bergonzi, George Garzone, Ran Blake, Allan Chase and Frank Carlberg. He also was a member of one of NEC’s prestigious Honors Ensembles.

Wania has performed and collaborated with musicians like Vladislav Sendecki, Tomasz Stańko, Marcus Miller, Dave Liebman, Lee Konitz, Anders Jormin, Gary Thomas, George Garzone, Eddie Henderson, Marilyn Mazur, Joey Baron, Nguyen Le, Don Byron, Jacek Kochan, Zbigniew Namysłowski, and Janusz Muniak among others. Currently he is involved with projects including Maciej Obara International Quartet with Ole Morten Vågan, Gard Nilssen, and Noise Trio. Besides giving performances he is also a DMA faculty member at the Academy of Music in Krakow and Institute of Jazz in Katowice. The release of his debut album Ravel (2013) was with Ravel’s Miroirs arranged for jazz trio.

== Honors ==
- 2003: 1st Prize at the 7th International Contemporary Chamber Music Competition in Kraków
- 2005: 1st Prize at the 2nd Jazz Piano Competition in Warsaw
- 2008: Ministry of Culture and National Heritage Scholarship 'Młoda Polska'
- 2014: Gwarancja Kultury in the 'Jazz, Rock, and Other' category
- 2014: Fryderyk Awards in categories: Jazz Album of the Year (Ravel), Jazz Artist of the Year, Jazz Debut of the Year

== Discography ==
=== Solo albums ===
- 2020: Lonely Shadows (ECM)

Trio with Lisa Gerrard/Zbigniew Preisner

- 2019: Zbigniew Preisner: Melodies of My Youth (Preisner Productions, Universal Music Polska, Chester Music Ltd.)

With Dominik Wania Trio

- 2013: Ravel (For Tune)

=== Collaborations ===
With George Garzone, Jacek Kochan Andrzej Święs

- 2011: Filing The Profile (Intuition)

With JWP.org

- 2004: Organizacja Live at Radio Katowice

With Vitaliy Ivanov Quartet

- 2006: Returning Live in Kiev DVD

With Bronisław Suchanek & Dominik Wania duo

- 2008: Sketch in Blue (Self Release)

With Geni Skendo & Dominik Wania duo

- 2008: Portraits (Shakuhachi & Piano Duets)

With Jacek Kochan and Michał Barański feat. Gary Thomas

- 2008: Man of No Words (GOWI)

With Tomek Grochot Quintet feat. Eddie Henderson

- 2010: My Stories (Self Release)

With Jacek Kochan Trio feat. George Garzone

- 2011: Filling the Profile (Intuition)

With Maciej Obara Quartet

- 2011: Equilibrium (Ars Cameralis Silesiae Superiors), with Maciej Garbowski, Krzysztof Gradziuk
- 2017: Unloved (ECM Records), with Ole Morten Vågan, Gard Nilssen
- 2019: Three Crowns (ECM Records), with Ole Morten Vågan, Gard Nilssen

With Piotr Baron Quintet

- 2012: Jazz na Hrade Live at Prague Castle (Multisonic)

With Wojtek Fedkowicz Noise Trio

- 2013: Post-Digital Dreamers (Audio Cave)

With Power of the Horns

- 2013: Alaman Live (For Tune)

With Maciej Obara International (Ole Morten Vågan, Gard Nilssen)

- 2013: Live at Manggha (For Tune)
- 2013: Komeda Live (For Tune)
- 2015: Live in Mińsk Mazowiecki (For Tune)

With Nak Trio

- 2015: The Other Side of If (Double Moon)
- 2017: Ambush (ForTune), Nak Trio & Arcos

With N S I Quartet (Bartek Prucnal, Cyprian Baszyński, Dawid Fortuna, Maciej Adamczak)

- 2017: The Look of Cobra (Audio Cave)
