= Isak Strand =

Norwegian musician (born 1982)

Isak Barosen Strand
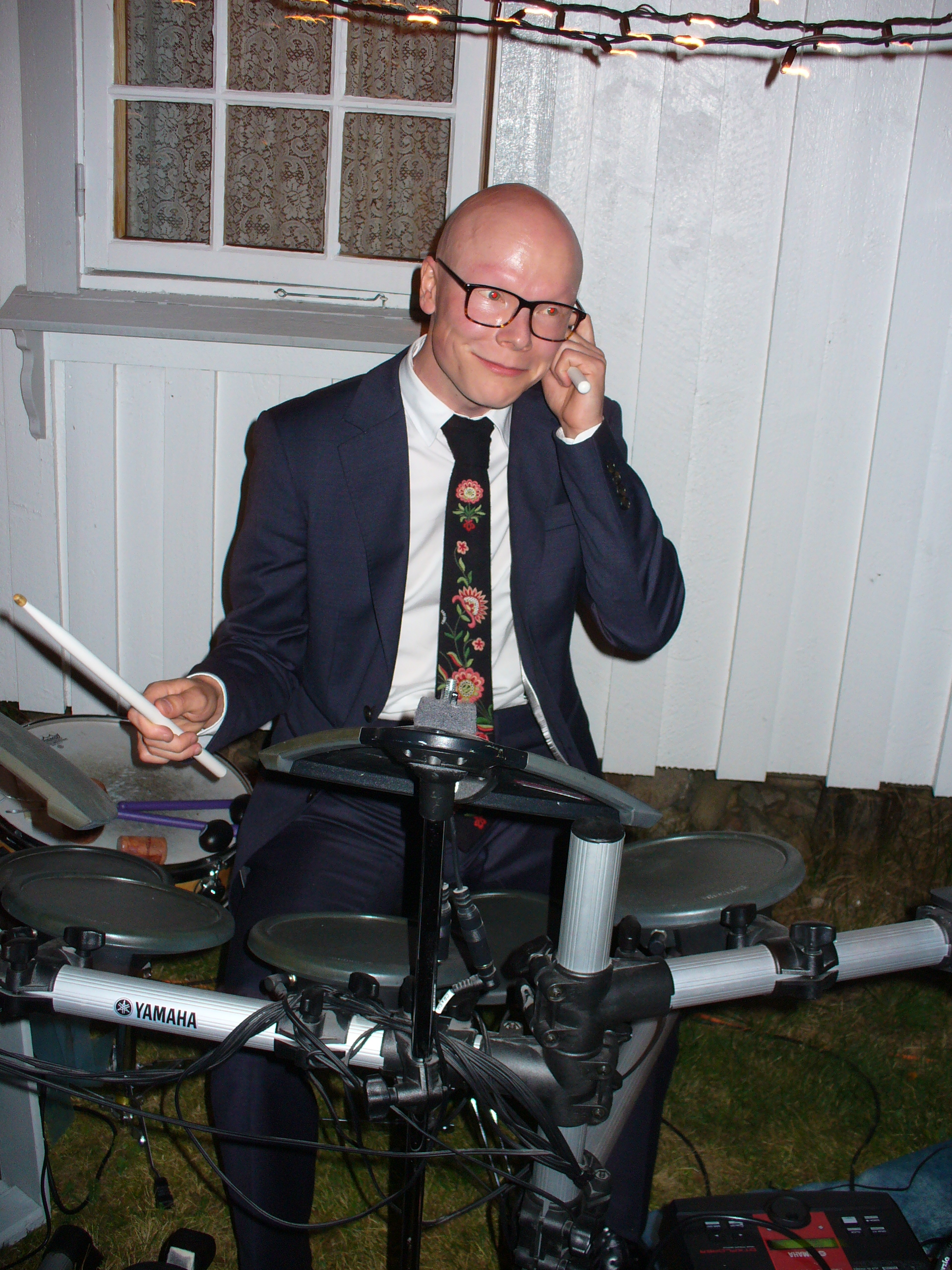
- Isak Strand at the Hvaler Summer Event, 2013.

Background information
- Born: Isak Strand; 8 March 1982 (age 44); Bergen, Hordaland
- Origin: Norway
- Genres: Electronica
- Occupations: Musician, composer, sound engineering, music producer
- Instruments: Drums, guitar and vocals
- Label: Knott Records
- Member of: Me At Sea
- Website: meatsea.com

Isak Barosen Strand (born 8 March 1982) is a Norwegian musician. He is known for his musical projects in different styles such as electro and techno.

== Career ==
Strand started playing drums at an early age, and attended the "Bergen Kulturskole" (1995–98) under guidance of Terje Isungset and Ivar Kolve among others. In 1998–2001 he went to the Music department at "Langhaugen vgs." in Bergen. Then he joined the Jazz program at Trøndertun folkehøgskole (specialization in audio engineering and midi), and principal instrument drums under guidance of Bjørnar Søreng.

Strand initiated Me At Sea in 2003, as a medium for his creative ideas in sound sampling. He has composed music for this project and another, Mezzophone (from 2001), for about a year before the local club Transformator found interest in his music and invited him for a gig in 2004. Me at Sea appeared on stage for the first time, hammering on beertins, bicycles, stones and grit. The show was met with great interest, and showed a way of presenting electronica for a live audience.

In 2005 Strand started a project with the Norwegian Jazz pianist Øystein Moen. This was a crossover project mixing his synthscape with the acoustic piano. Combining lyrical piano pieces with noise and suggestive drums they found a strange relaxing sound they wanted to go on working with. The band presented a gig at the Ekkofest the same year well received by the audience.

Strand also has regular DJ nights at the rock club Garage in Bergen with the concept *Menn med ærlig arbe'.

== Discography ==
Albums

- 2005: Moen Meets Me at Sea (Knott Records)
- 2007: The Last Years of Joy (Knott Records)

EPs

- 2005: Some Place EP (Knott Records)
- 2005: Floorkillers Volume 1 (Knott Records)
- 2005: Floorkillers Volume 2 (Knott records)
- 2010: Dunk! Dunk! (Knott Records)

As producer and sound engineer

- 2006: Definition of Ill – The mixtape (Definition of Ill)
- 2007: Stereo21 – Amazing Space/As We Run Through The Places We Love 7"(Kontrabande Records)
- 2007: Iris Waves – The non-exclusive EP (Knott Records)
- 2010: The Soul Express Orchestra – Time for a change (Lill'-Bit Records), with Stig van Eijk
- 2010: Stereo21 – Stereo21 (Kontrabande Records)
- 2011: Lovecult – Supersonic (Knott Records)

As sound engineer

- 2006: Galar – Skogskvad (Heavy Horses Records)
- 2008: Sunn O)) – Dømkirke (Southern Lord))) (5 versjioner)
- 2009: Dbo – Rooms (+3db Records)
- 2010: Bjørn Hellfuck – Innforjævlig (Universal Music)
- 2010: Gravdal – Torturmantra (Unexploded Records)
- 2012: Her Name and Mine – The Oslo Recordings (Little Blue Records) including Pernille Koch (vocals) and Fredrik Mikkelsen (guitar)
