= Piotr Damasiewicz =

Polish musician (born 1980)

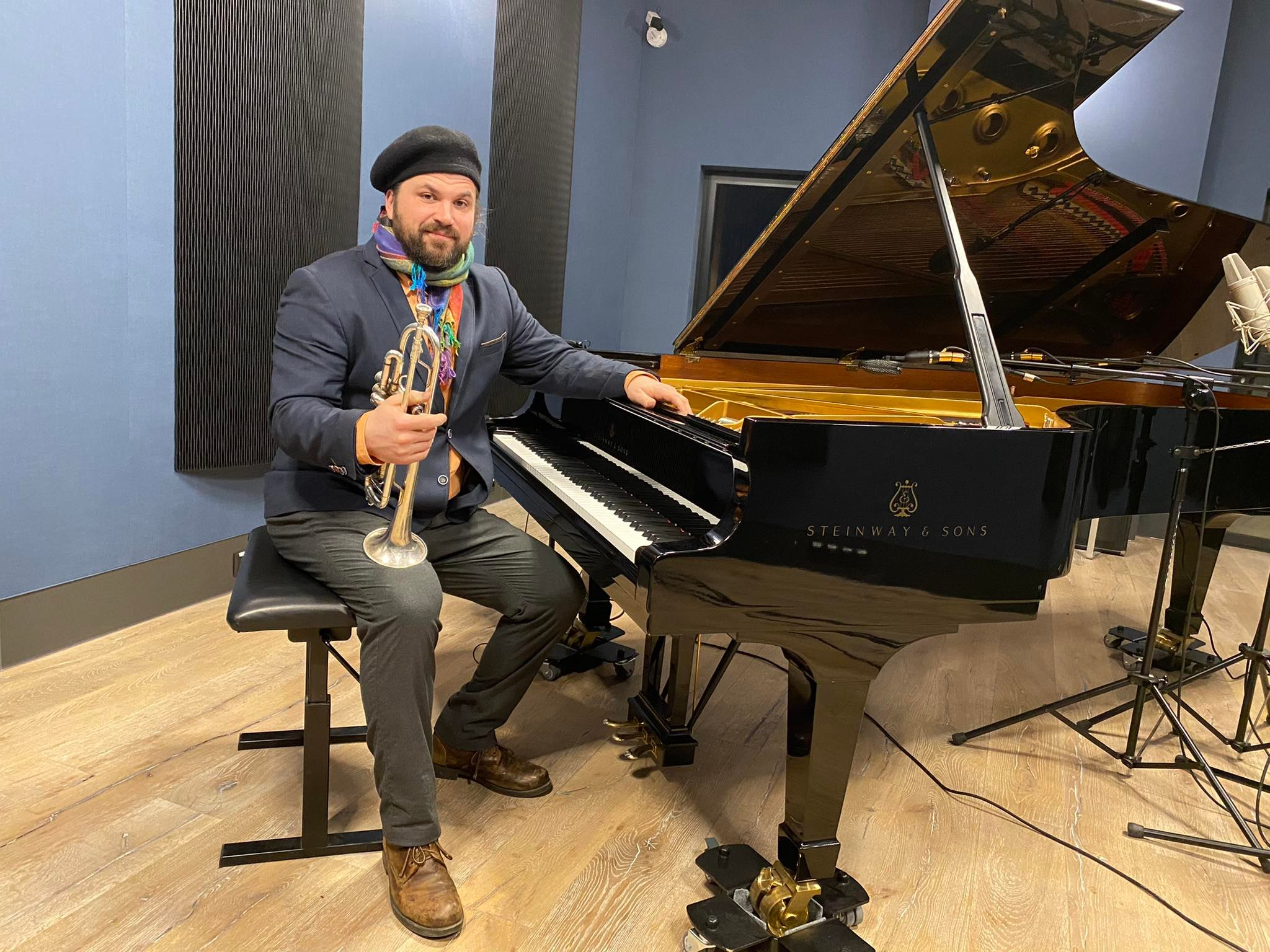
- Damasiewicz in 2022
- Born: Piotr Damasiewicz; 11 April 1980 (age 45); Wrocław, Poland
- Education: Wrocław Academy of Music; Feliks Nowowiejski Music Academy; Karol Szymanowski Academy of Music
- Occupation: Composer
- Website: https://piotrdamasiewicz.com/en/

Piotr Damasiewicz (born 11 April 1980), also known as Damaś, is a Polish composer, vocalist and multi-instrumentalist. His instruments include the trumpet, double bass and piano. He studied music in Wrocław, Bydgoszcz and Katowice.

== Early life and education ==
Damasiewicz was born on 11 April 1980 in Wrocław, Poland. He pursued his studies in Wrocław (Wrocław Academy of Music), Bydgoszcz (Feliks Nowowiejski Music Academy), and Katowice (Karol Szymanowski Academy of Music). He later established the Music According To Art Association (MATA), which supports artists pursuing alternative forms of expression.

== Career and compositional works ==
Damasiewicz has formed the bands: Power of the Horns, Mnemotaksja and Into The Roots. L.A.S. Collective, and also as a coolider: Hangar Musics with Emilio Gordoa, Damasiewicz - Wójcik duo, Damasiewicz- Miguła Duo. He has composed orchestral, solo, and chamber works.

His compositional repertoire draws on classical music influences such as Gregorian chant and choral works. Furthermore, he incorporates elements of jazz, 20th-century classical music, ethnic music, and European improvised music into his compositions.

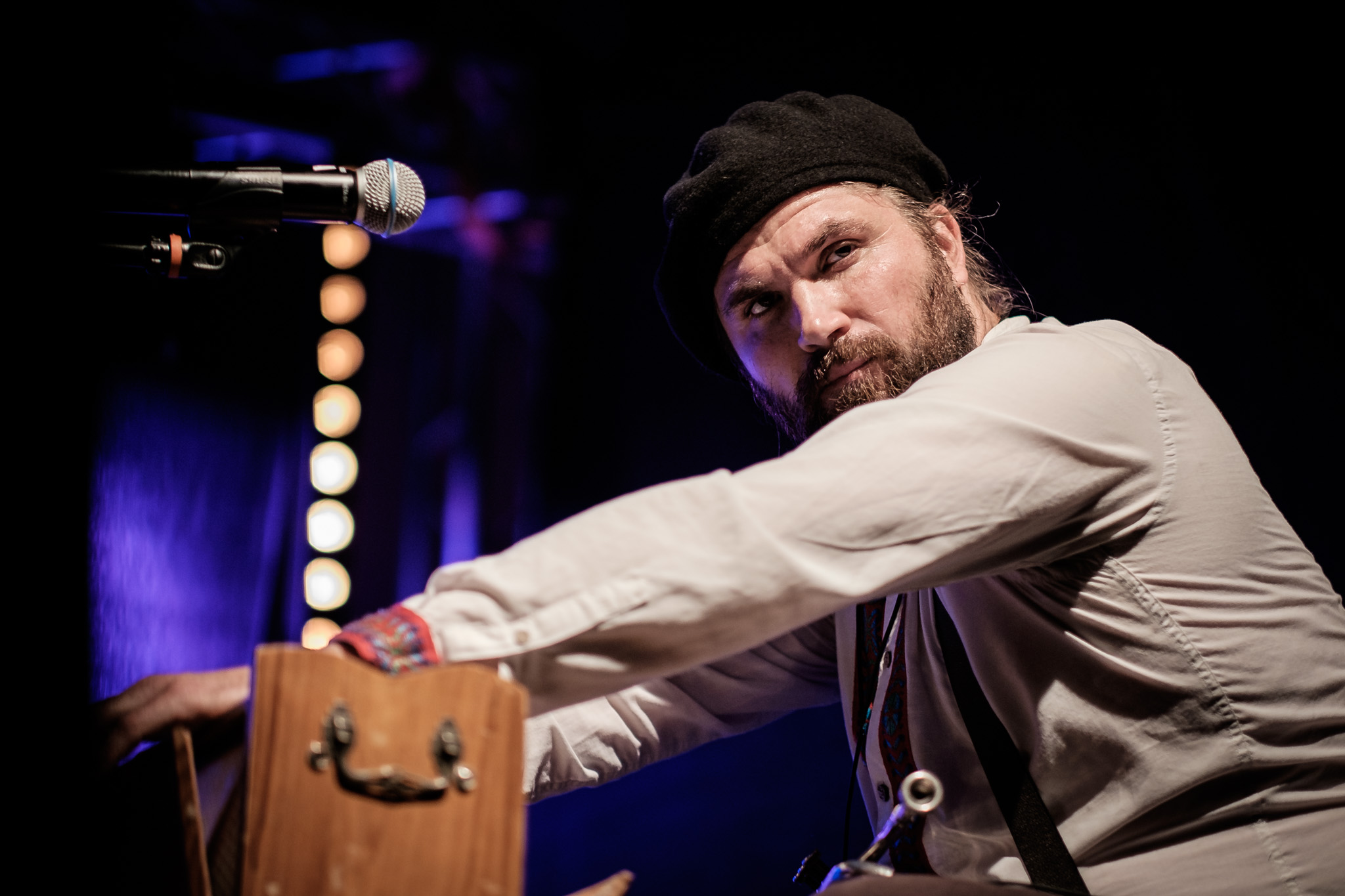
Piotr Damasiewicz, photo by Grzegorz Czech

Damasiewicz has represented Poland in four international music programs and initiatives, including Take Five Europe, JazzPlaysEurope Laboratory, Art Meetings and Melting Pot Laboratory (Jazztopad). He received a doctorate from the Instrumental Department of the Feliks Nowowiejski Academy of Music in Bydgoszcz.

Damasiewicz composed "Hadrons" following a commission from the Jazztopad festival, "Suite 29" was written for the World Jazz Days event, organized by Polish Radio Program II. He also composed a piece for 27 improvisers as part of the final Melting Pot (Jazztopad) platform in Wrocław and created "Some Kind of Greek Story" written for Polish-Portuguese improvise orchestra, commissioned by Casa de Musica in Porto. Additionally, Damasiewicz composed the music for The Scent of Lviv, a film by Grzegorz Korczak.

He is a co-composer of the European Jazz Anthem, created for the 25th anniversary of the European Jazz Network.

== Collaborations ==
- David Murray
- Jason Moran
- James Carter
- Tomasz Stanko
- Antoine Roney
- Kojo Roney
- Lotte Anker
- Magda Mayas
- Phil Minton
- Cleveland Watkiss
- Jeb Bishop
- Andrzej Bauer
- Dave Rempis
- Michael Zerang
- joe Smith
- Paul Nilsen Lowe
- Skalpel
- Jon Fält
- Satoko Fuji
- Morihide Sawada
- Hans Koch
- Joker Nies
- Kazuhisa Uchihashi
- Rodrigo Amado
- Zdzisław Piernik
- Per Zanussi
- Marcin Masecki
- Cezary Duchnowski
- Josh Sinton
- Betina Wenzel
- Wolfgang Reisinger
- Eduardo Maraffa
- Mathias Muche
- Maciej Garbowski
- Aukso Chamber Orchestra
- Red Trio
- Gerard Lebik
- Ranijd Prasad
- Marek Moś
- Aukso

He frequently collaborates with Maciej Obara and Dominik Wania.

== Selected discography ==
=== As leader ===
Year	Project/Title	Label
2011	Piotr Damasiewicz / "Hadrons"	Ars Cameralis Records
2013	Piotr Damasiewicz / ''Power Of The Horns''	For Tune
2013	Piotr Damasiewicz/ "Imprographic"	For Tune
2014	Piotr Damasiewicz Quartet / ''Mnemotaksja''	For Tune
2020	Piotr Damasiewicz Into The Roots / "Śpiwle"	L.A.S listening and sounding
2021	Piotr Damasiewicz / "Hadrons"	L.A.S listening and sounding
2021	Piotr Damasiewicz Into The Roots / "Watra"	L.A.S listening and sounding

=== As co-founder ===
Year	Project/Title	Label
2013	veNN circles Tuple	B.D.T.A.
2014	veNN circles	
2015	Red Trio / Lebik / Damasiewicz Mineral	Bocian

=== As a sideman ===
Year	Project/Title	Label/Country	
2011	''Concept Art Orchestra Katowice''	Conductor Ed Partyka	Cesky Rozhlas / Czech Republic
2012	''Maciej Garbowski Elements''	IMP (international music production)	
2012	"Kariera Kolysanki"	kariera.art.pl	
2015	''Maciej Garbowski Sesto Elemento''	Fundacja Sluchaj	
2015	''Marek Kądziela ADHD In Bloom''	For Tune	
2015	Spinifex "Maximus”	Tryton / Holland	
2018	Michał Jaros “Floating Bridges”		
