= Trøndertun Folk High School =

Trøndertun folkehøgskole
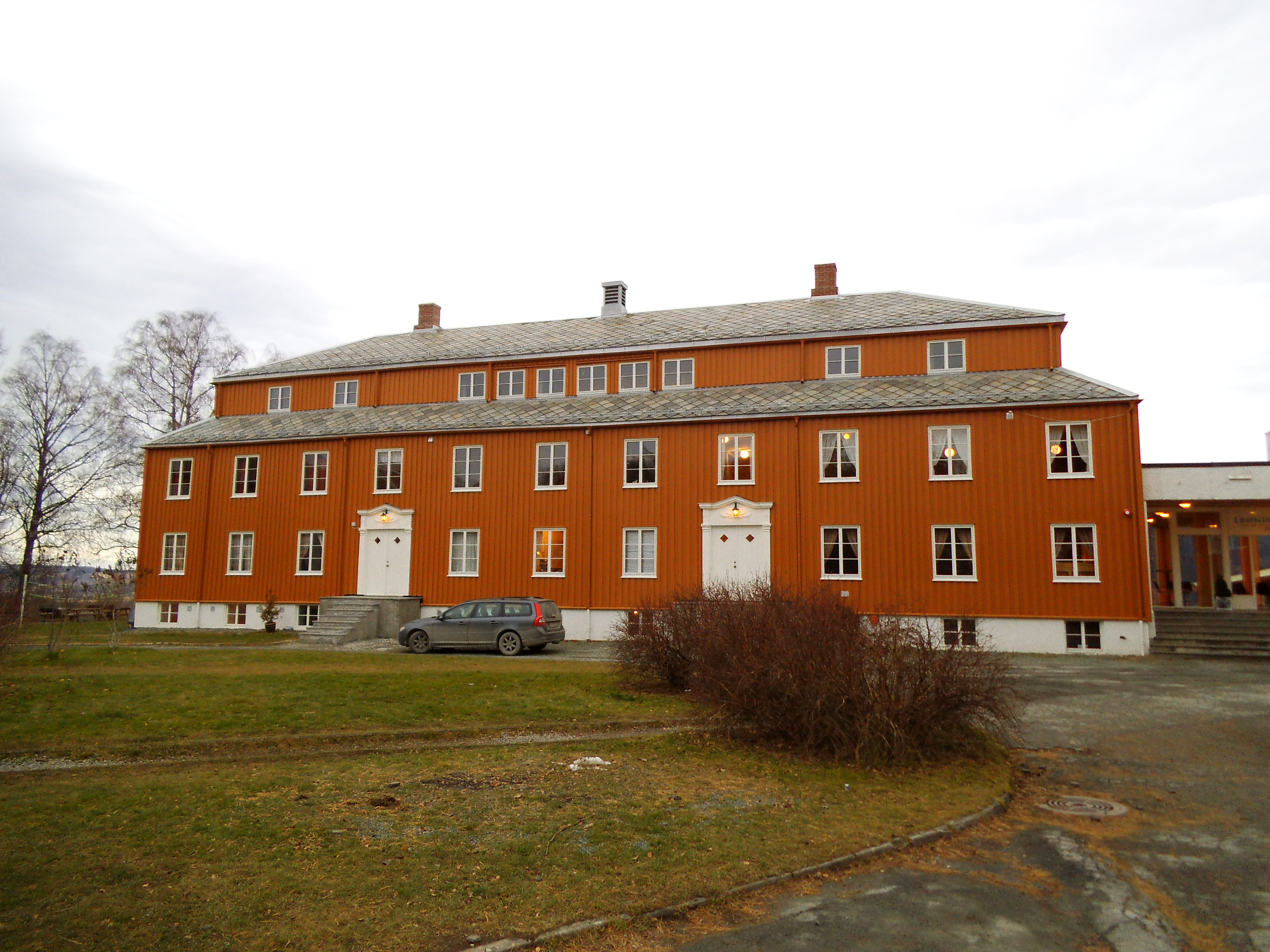
- Trøndertun folkehøgskole in 2012

Location
- Gimse, Trøndelag; Norway
- 63°16′37″N 10°15′08″E

Trøndertun folkehøgskole is a "frilynt folkehøgskole" (not Christian) in Gimse in the village of Melhus in Melhus Municipality in Trøndelag county, Norway. The school annually welcomes about 150 students and is owned by "Gauldal Høgskulelag".

Teachers at the school are professionally strong with experience as performing artists.

== Main subjects of this school are ==
- Dance
- Singer Songwriter
- Music Production
- Jazz
- Rock
- Instrumental (genre free)

== Alumni ==
- 1983-84: Kåre Kolve - saxophone (Voss)
- 1991-92: Ståle Storløkken - keyboards (Dombås)
- 1988-89: Lars Håvard Haugen - guitar (Hallingdal)
- 1991-92: Hans Magnus Ryan - guitar (Trondheim)
- 1991-92: Håkon Gebhardt - drums (Tromsø)
- 1997-98: Nikolai Eilertsen - bass guitar (Skotselv)
- 1997-98: Torstein Lofthus - drums (Øystese)
- 1999-00: Siri Wålberg - vocals (Oppegård)
- 2001-02: Isak Strand - drums & electronics (Bergen)
- 2006-07: Henrik B. Michelsen - sound engineering (Bergen)
- 2007-08: Jonas Alaska - vocal & guitar (Åmli)
- 2016-17: Berit Dybing
- 2017-18: Synne Vo
