= Fredrik Mikkelsen =

Norwegian musician and composer (born 1981)

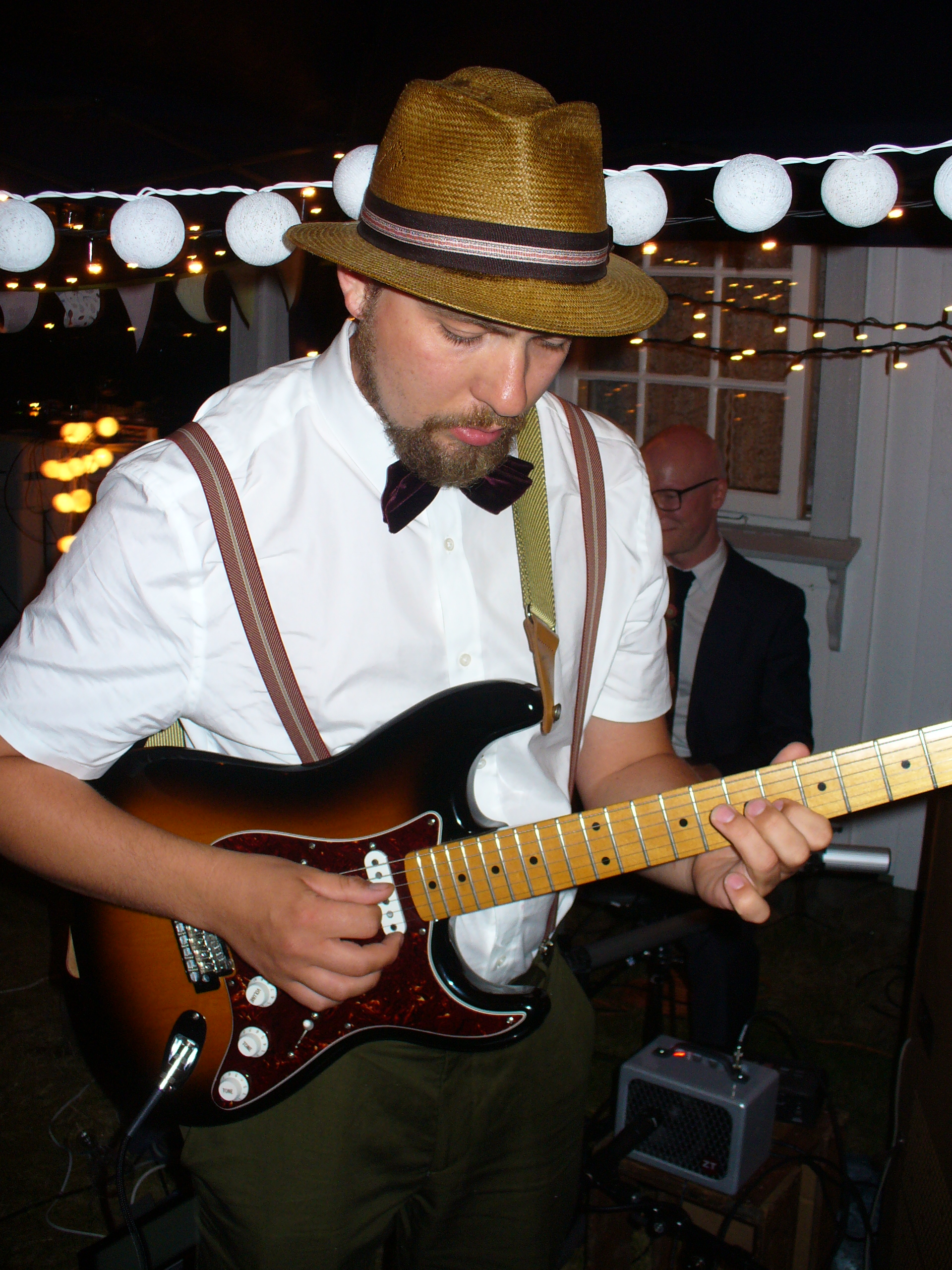
- Fredrik Mikkelsen at the Hvaler Summer Event.

Background information
- Born: 24 October 1981 (age 44); Bergen, Hordaland
- Origin: Norway
- Genres: Jazz
- Occupations: Musician, composer
- Instrument: Guitar
- Website: Fredrik Mikkelsen on Myspace

Fredrik Mikkelsen (born 24 October 1981 in Bergen, Norway) is a Norwegian musician and composer, playing both the traditional and lap steel guitar, within a series of genres like jazz, blues and folk, living in Copenhagen since 2008.

== Career ==
Mikkelsen started early to play the guitar and is largely an autodidact musician. He got his formal musical training from the Music program at "Voss gymnas" (1997–2000), which gave him the fundamental tools to understand music and continue studying on his own accord. Together with friends like Isak Strand he performed on various locations and recordings within local bands, for the most part solo or duo constellations.

Mikkelsen holds a Bachelor of Nursing at Høgskolen i Bergen (2006), and during his studies he traveled to Zansibar and got influences from African musical traditions there. Later, he moved to Copenhagen, where he started playing more blues, folk and jazz inspired music with the vocalist Pernille Koch, under the name "Her Name and Mine", performing at the Dancing at Copenhagen Jazz Festival in the summer of 2013.

== Discography ==
- 2012: The Oslo Recordings (Little Blue Records), within "Her Name and Mine" including vocalist Pernille Koch
