= Me At Sea =

Solo electronica project for Isak Strand

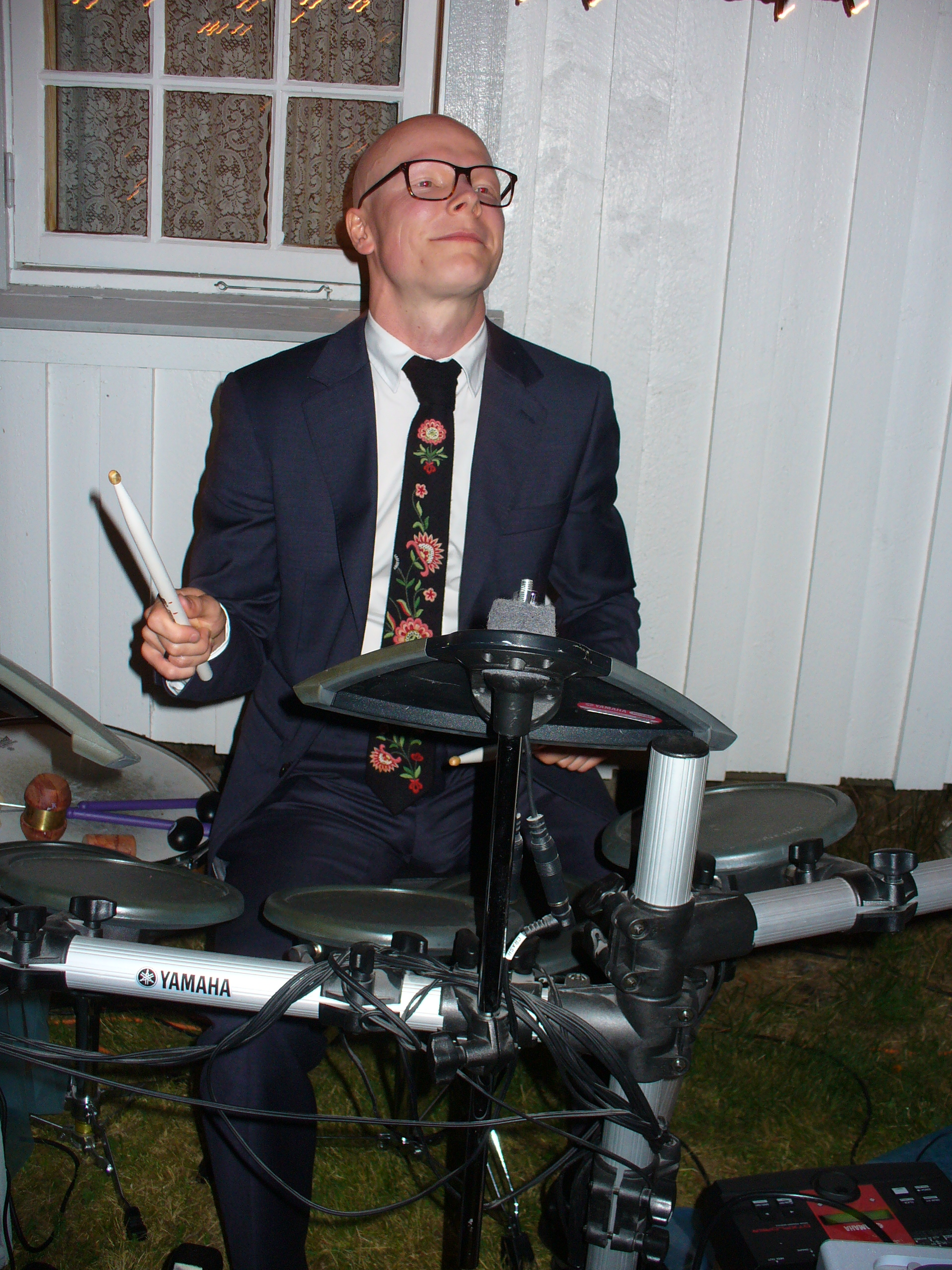
- Me At Sea at the Hvaler Summer Event, 2013.

Background information
- Origin: Bergen, Norway
- Genres: Electronica
- Years active: 2003–present
- Labels: Knott Records
- Members: Isak Strand
- Website: www.meatsea.com

Me At Sea (initiated 2003 in Bergen, Norway) is a solo electronica project of Isak Strand.

== Biography ==
While wandering around the streets of Bergen sampling city sounds, hammering on stones and grit, Strand sampled sounds for the first song of the project, «No need for hibernation». Me At Sea appeared at local clubs from 2004, and the great Bergen electronic music Ekkofestival. The szynthskape meets the acoustic piano in a challenging creative union. Moen Met Me At Sea the summer 2005 in studio with open minds, letting new musical ideas flowing into their cooperative musical minds. Working with some takes they soon discovered a musical mix they both wanted to elaborate on. They worked together from two different starting points, this creating an astonishingly new soundscape.

Strand, influenced by Terje Isungset and other former drum teachers, show a percussive musical mind often with melodic lines that argue their way through an electronic soundscape pointing to his IDM influences. His solo performances is known for its springy ideas combining computers with Frank Zappa inspired bisicle concerts, often including electronic drums and creative percussions. Pianist Øystein Moen, in the line-up of bands like Jaga Jazzist and Puma, bring along a huge pack of musical ballast ranging from lyrical piano pieces to contemporary electric freebag. Moen meets Me at Sea are presenting original material including different emotions like the piceful harmonies to externalizing parts of noise-impro. They want to keep the music in between genres, and show elements of their musical influences, such as Brad Mehldau, Paul Bley and Keith Jarrett has to be mentioned, and electronic artists such as Flotel and Ilkae.

== Discography ==
Albums

- Moen Meets Me At Sea (Knott Records, 2005)
- The Last Years Of Joy (Knott Records, 2007)

EP's

- Some Place EP (Knott Records, 2005)
