= Gard Nilssen =

Norwegian jazz drummer and composer

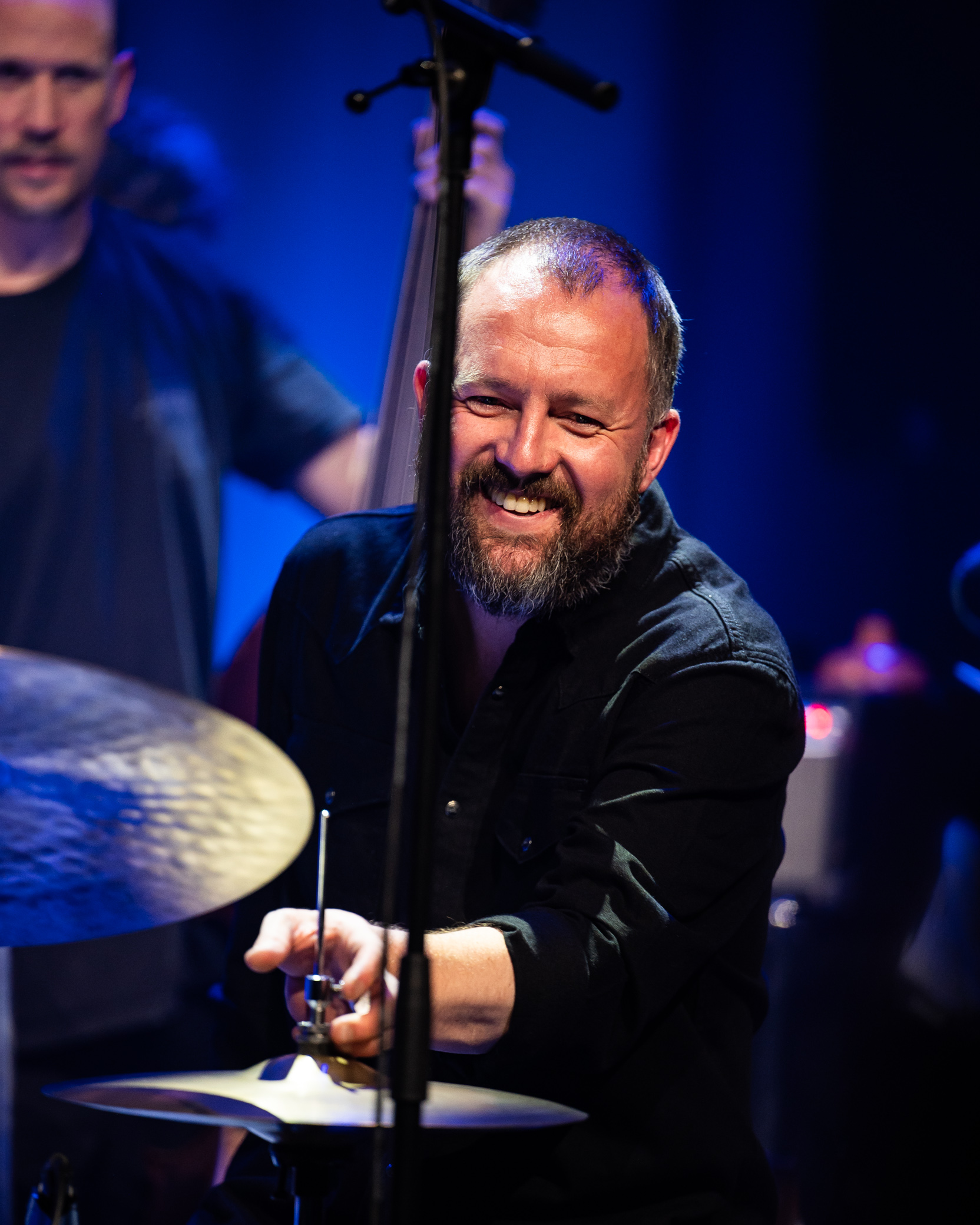
- Gard Nilssen at the Kongsberg Jazzfestival 2025

Background information
- Born: 24 June 1983 (age 43); Skien, Telemark, Norway
- Origin: Norway
- Genre: Jazz
- Occupations: Musician, composer
- Instrument: Drums

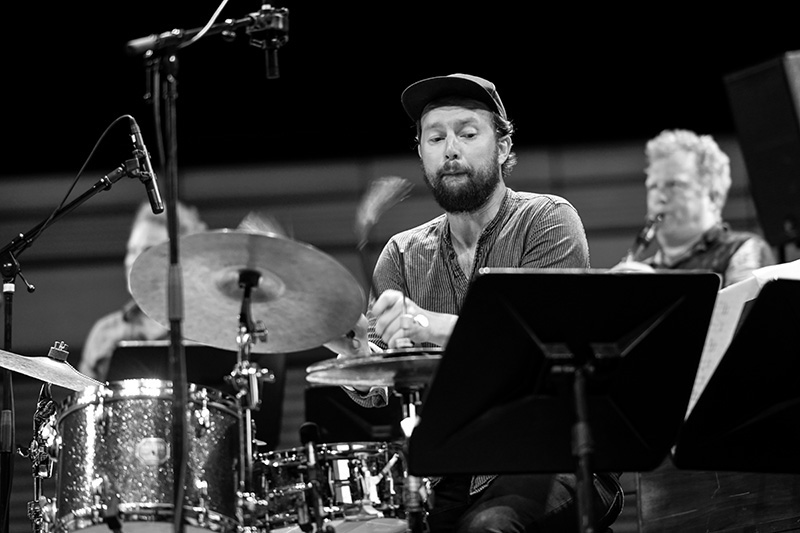
Gard Nilssen performing with Trondhjem Jazz Orchestra at Reykjavik Jazz Festival 2017

Gard Nilssen (born 24 June 1983) is a Norwegian jazz drummer and composer. He is a member of the bands Gard Nilssen' Acoustic Unity, Gard Nilssen's Supersonic Orchestra, Bushman's Revenge, Amgala Temple, and Puma. He also plays in trio format with Bugge Wesseltoft and Arild Andersen.

== Career ==
Nilssen was born in Skien, and got his musical education on the Jazz program at Trondheim Musikkonservatorium (2003). He was voted this year's young jazz musicians in 2006 with the group Puma. Otherwise Nilssen is very active in bands like Bushman´s Revenge, Lord Kelvin, and Heidi Skjerve Kvintett.

Nilssen was chosen to represent Norway in the artist development program Take Five, a music developer program promoted by the London-based concert promoter Serious.

== Honors ==
- This year's young jazz musicians 2006, with the band Puma by Rikskonsertene and Norsk Jazzforum

== Discography ==
=== Solo albums ===
==== Gard Nilssen's Acoustic Unity, including André Roligheten and Petter Eldh ====
- 2015: Firehouse (Clean Feed Records)
- 2017: Live in Europe (Clean Feed Records)
- 2019: To Whom Who Buys a Record (Grappa Musikkforlag AS)
- 2022: Elastic Wave (ECM Records)
- 2025: Live At The Barbican (Action Jazz)
- 2025: Great Intentions (Action Jazz)

==== Gard Nilssen's Supersonic Orchestra ====
- 2020: If You Listen Carefully The Music Is Yours (Odin)
- 2023: Family (We Jazz)

=== Band releases ===
==== Within Puma trio including Øystein Moen and Stian Westerhus ====
- 2007: Isolationism (Bolage Records)
- 2008: Discotheque Bitpunching (Bolage Records)
- 2009: Fist Full of Knuckles (Knuckleman Records), with Lasse Marhaug
- 2010: Half Nelson Courtship (Rune Grammofon)

==== Within Bushman's Revenge trio including Rune Nergaard and Even Helte Hermansen ====
- 2007: Cowboy Music (Jazzaway Records)
- 2009: You Lost Me At Hello (Rune Grammofon)
- 2010: Jitterbug (Rune Grammofon)
- 2012: A Little Bit Of Big Bonanza (Rune Grammofon)
- 2012: Never Mind The Botox (Rune Grammofon)
- 2013: Electric Komle – Live! (Rune Grammofon)
- 2016: Jazz, Fritt Etter Hukommelsen (Rune Grammofon)
- 2016: Bushman's Fire (Rune Grammofon), live LP with Kjetil Møster and David Wallumrød
- 2019: Et Hån Mot Overklassen (Hubro)
- 2023: All The Better For Seeing You (Is It Jazz? Records)

==== Within Lord Kelvin trio including Eirik Hegdal and Erik Johannessen ====
- 2009: Dances In The Smoke (Jazzland Recordings)
- 2011: Radio Has No Future (Gigafon Records)

==== Within Cortex quartet including Ola Høyer, Kristoffer Berre Alberts and Thomas Johansson ====
- 2011: Resection (Bolage Records)
- 2012: Göteborg (Gigafon Records)

==== Within Amgala Temple including Lars Horntveth and Amund Maarud ====
- 2018: Invisible Airships (Pekula Records)

=== Collaborations ===
==== With Marita Røstad ====
- 2007: Silent Sunday (Magica Records)

==== Within "Team Hegdal" quartet including Eirik Hegdal, André Roligheten and Rune Nergaard ====
- 2010: Vol 1 (Øra Fonogram)
- 2011: Vol 2 (Øra Fonogram), sextet including additional Mattias Ståhl and Ola Kvernberg

==== Within Scent Of Soil quintet including Tore Brunborg, Kirsti Huke, Petter Vågan and Rune Nergaard ====
- 2011: Scent Of Soil (Hubro Music)

==== With Obara International ====
- 2013: Komeda (For Tune)
- 2013: Live At Manggha (For Tune)
- 2015: Live In Mińsk Mazowiecki (For Tune)

==== With Elvira Nikolaisen and Mathias Eick ====
- 2013: I Concentrate On You (Grappa)

==== With Arild Andersen and Helge Lien ====
- 2016: The Rose Window (Deutsche Media Productions), live at Theater Gütersloh

==== With Maciej Obara Quartet ====
- 2017: Unloved (ECM Records)
- 2019: Three Crowns (ECM Records)
