= Synne Vo =

Norwegian singer (born 1998)

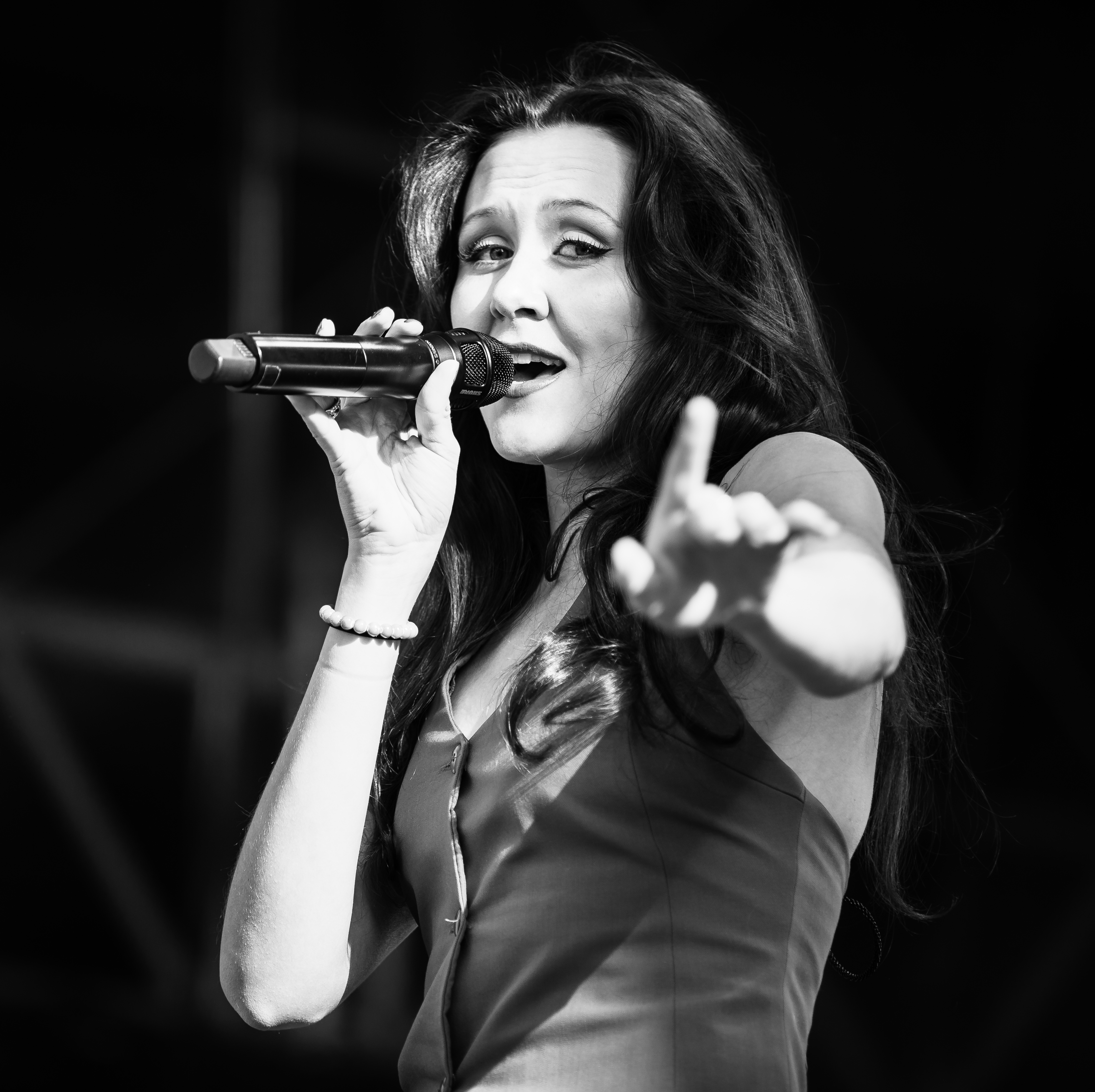
- Synne Vo performing at Kirketorget, Kongsberg 2024; Photo: Tore Sætre

Background information
- Born: Synne Vorkinn; 1998 (age 27–28); Oppland, Norway
- Genre: Pop
- Occupations: Singer; songwriter
- Years active: 2018–present
- Label: Warner Music Norway

Synne Vorkinn (born 1998), known professionally as Synne Vo, is a Norwegian singer and songwriter.

== Musical career ==
Vorkinn comes from Lesja Municipality, Norway. In 2018 she took part in the TV show Idol. After graduating from secondary school, she attended the pop music branch of Trøndertun folkehøgskole. She then studied music production in Lillehammer for a year. After graduating in 2020, she received a recording contract with Warner Music Norway. For the film Børning 3, she contributed the English-language song "Gonna Be Alright". However, she mostly sings in her dialect, which comes from the Gudbrandsdalen region.

Vorkinn co-wrote the song How About Mars, with which the singer Anna Jæger competed at the Melodi Grand Prix 2020. She was also involved as a songwriter on the songs Bare når det regner and Smilet i dit eget speil, which were released as singles by Chris Holsten. Smilet i ditt eget speil was awarded “Song of the Year” at the two Norwegian music awards P3 Gull and Spellemannprisen for the music year 2021. She was also nominated in the newcomer category at P3 Gull. With the song Ett minutt, released at the beginning of 2021, she was able to place herself in the Norwegian single charts for the first time in 2022. The song was used in the NRK series Rådebank. She was nominated in the "Artist of the Year" category at the P3 Gull music award in 2022 and 2023.

== Discography ==
=== Studio albums ===
List of studio albums, with selected details
Title	Details	Peak chart positions
Title	Details	NOR
Kanskje det går te helvete	Released: 27 September 2024; Label: Warner Music Norway; Formats: Digital download, streaming	8

=== Extended plays ===
List of EPs, with selected details
Title	Details	Peak chart positions
Title	Details	NOR
MVH	Released: 3 March 2023; Label: Warner Music Norway; Formats: Digital download	13

=== Singles ===
Title	Year	Peak chart positions	Certifications	Album or EP
Title	Year	NOR	Certifications	Album or EP
"Lær meg å lever"	2018	—		Non-album singles
"Ikkje tenk på meg"	2020	—		Non-album singles
"Gonna Be Alright"	2020	—		Non-album singles
"Ett minutt"	2021	26	IFPI NOR: Gold	Non-album singles
"De e OK um du glømme me"	2021	—		Non-album singles
"Seksten"	2021	—		Non-album singles
"Spagetti for to"	2021	—		Non-album singles
"Heime"	2022	38		Non-album singles
"Lykke te"	2022	31		Non-album singles
"St.Hanshaugen"	2022	—		Non-album singles
"Desember"	2022	73		Non-album singles
"OK"	2023	16		Non-album singles
"Synnes sumarvise"	2023	—		Non-album singles
"Ti kniver i hjertet"	2023	—		Non-album singles
"Ser du den såmmå himmelen"	2023	62		Non-album singles
"Du ska få en dag i mårgå"	2025	21		PS. Kanskje det går
"Her vil e vær"	2025	6		PS. Kanskje det går
"Kanskje det går te helvete"	2025	50		PS. Kanskje det går
"Alle vil til himmelen" (with Emma Steinbakken)	2025	3		Non-album singles
"Uerstattele"	2026	6		Non-album singles
"Under våre laken"	2026	5		Non-album singles
"Lommeringe" (with Emma Steinbakken)	2026	6		Non-album singles
"Te de som elske han"	2026	4		Non-album singles
"Det tek ei bygd" (with Jonas Benyoub)	2026	45		Non-album singles
"Bygda"	2026	3		Non-album singles
"Nonchalant" (with Marcus & Martinus)	2026	35		Non-album singles
"Tar det i morgen" (with Marit Larsen)	2026	82		Non-album singles
"Full og fin"	2026	4		Non-album singles
"Heldig"	2026	14		Non-album singles
"Mellom hei og hade"	2026	56		Non-album singles
"—" denotes a recording that did not chart or was not released in that territory.
