= Side Brok =

Norwegian rap group

- Origin: Ørsta, Norway
- Genres: Hip hop
- Years active: 2000–present
- Label: PinaDGreitt Records
- Members: Sjef R/Thorstein Hyl III; Skatebård; Tore B Odd G

Side Brok is a Norwegian rap group from Ørsta, in western Norway. The members of Side Brok are Sjef R, his alter ego Thorstein Hyl III, Skatebård, Tore B, Odd G and Tunk. The group received the Nynorsk User of the Year award in 2004.

== Discography ==
- Side Brok EP (2002)
- Høge Brelle (2004)
- Side Brooklyn EP (2005)
- Kar Me Kjøme Frå (2006)
- Ekte Menn (2009)
- H.O.V.D.E.B.Y.G.D.A. (2013)
- All verda (2025)
