= Ber (musician) =

American indie pop musician (born 1998)

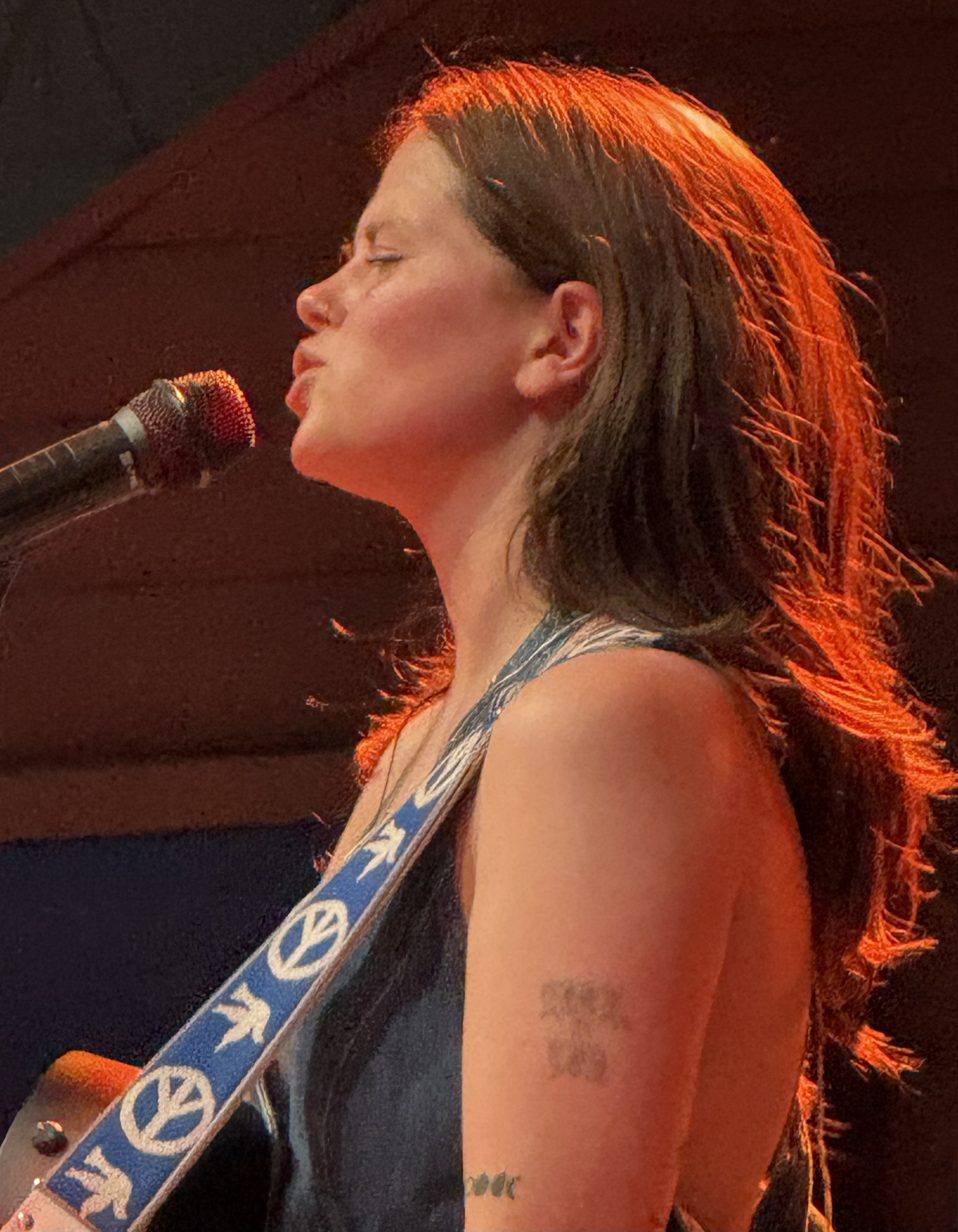
- Ber performing in 2025

Background information
- Born: Berit Dybing; April 7, 1998 (age 28)
- Genre: Indie pop
- Instruments: Guitar; vocals
- Label: AWAL

TikTok information
- Page: heythereitsber
- Followers: 105.1 thousand
- Last updated: June 12, 2024

Berit Dybing (born April 7, 1998), known as Ber, is an American indie pop singer-songwriter. She has released three EPs: And I’m Still Thinking About That (2022), Halfway (2023), and Room for You (2024).

== Early life and education ==
Dybing grew up in Walker, Minnesota. She is of Norwegian heritage and her name is of Scandinavian origin, although her friends and family always referred to her as the shortened "Ber". She took lessons in music, guitar, and piano as a child, supported by her parents. At age 7, she used GarageBand on her parents' laptop to create her first song, "In My Head". In 2016, she graduated from Bemidji High School in Bemidji, Minnesota. In high school, she listened to a lot of folk music and indie pop, including Mumford & Sons and The Lumineers as well as the Blurryface album by Twenty One Pilots. As a teenager, she performed cover versions of Mumford & Sons songs in bars. After high school, she took a gap year and participated in a program at Trøndertun Folk High School in Trondheim, where she focused on jazz and started a folk band with three other students. She was accepted into a vocal performance program at Leeds Conservatoire and moved to the UK with one of her bandmates as well as her then boyfriend. She graduated from the school in 2020, completing her last semester via Zoom due to the COVID-19 pandemic. In December 2020, with her visa expired, she moved back to Minnesota, where she spent a year-and-half living in her aunt and uncle's basement in south Minneapolis. She took two part-time jobs to be able to afford rent. Although she was frustrated with her dating experiences, they influenced her to write songs.

== Career ==
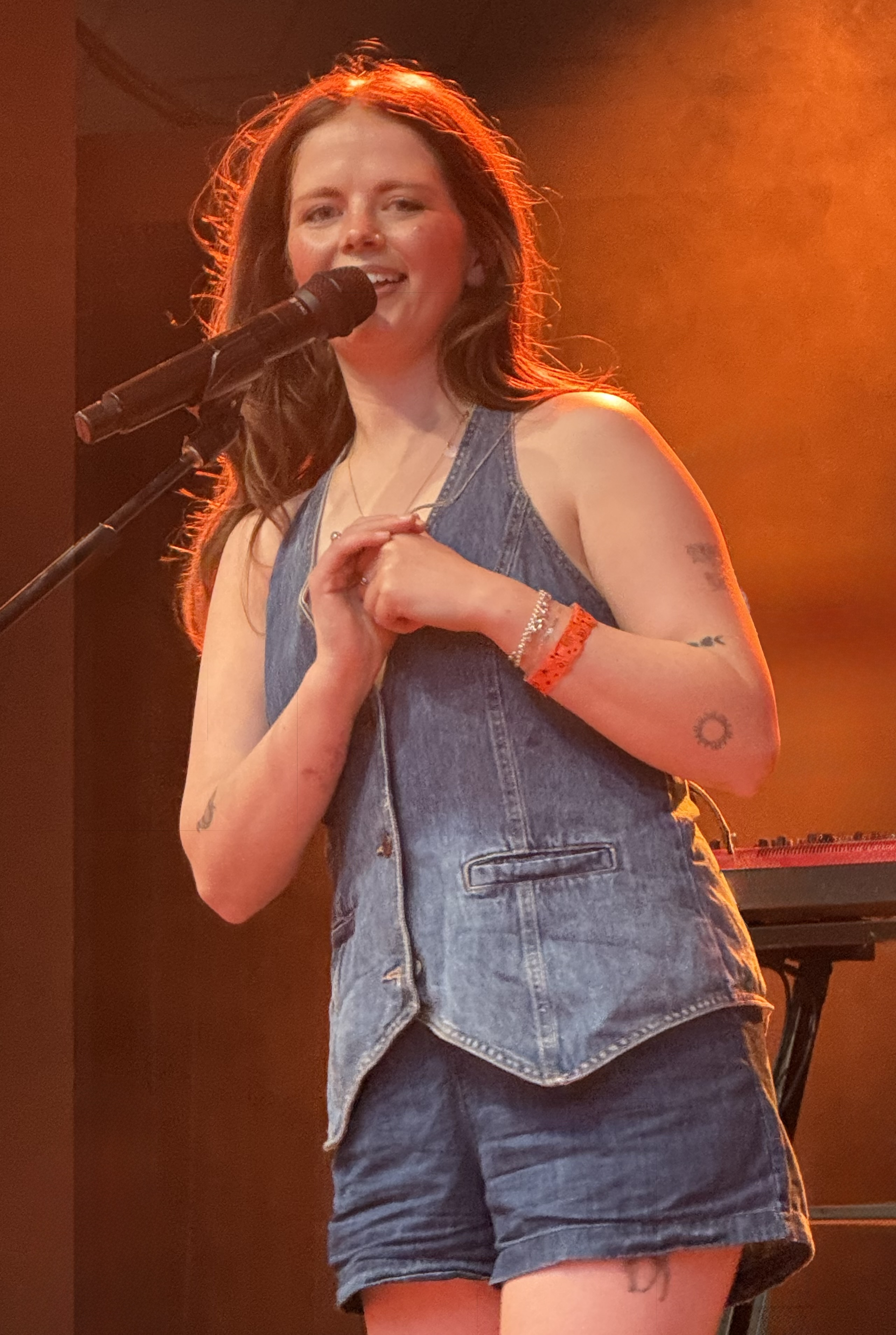
Ber performing at the 2025 Minnesota State Fair

In April 2021, Ber posted her first songs to YouTube. In August 2021, a snippet of her song "Meant to Be", a collaboration with singer-songwriter Charlie Oriain from Isle of Wight, became a viral video on TikTok. She then performed at shows locally in Minnesota. Her debut EP, And I'm Still Thinking of That, which includes the heartbreak songs "Bad for Me" and "Same Effect" as well as the lighter songs "Dead Dear (Deer)" and "Feels So Easy", was released in February 2022.

In March 2022, Ber performed at South by Southwest, where she was introduced by Linda Perry.

In February 2023, Dybing released her second EP, Halfway, via AWAL. It has six songs including "Boys Who Kiss You in Their Car" and "Your Internet Sucks". The EP is about Dybing unsuccessfully trying to get over a man who ghosted her.

In May 2024, Dybing released her third EP, Room for You. Its six songs include "Better Man", "Middle of Nowhere", and the title track. The songs feature collaborations with Now, Now.

== Artistry and influences ==
Ber's music has been described as "Olivia Rodrigo with more pop-punk tones and a little of Lana Del Rey's wicked wordplay".

Ber cites influences from Marcus Mumford, John Denver, Chris Martin, Joni Mitchell, Maggie Rogers, Sigrid, Taylor Swift, Julia Michaels, and Jeremy Zucker.

== Tours ==
=== Headlining ===
- Halfway Across America Tour (2023)
- Halfway Across The Pond (2023)

=== Opening act ===
- Tom Odell - The Monsters Tour (2022) - U.S. shows
- Sigrid - How To Let Go Tour (2022) - U.S. shows
- Good Neighbours - The Good Neighbours World Tour (2024) - U.S. shows
- Calum Scott - The Avenoir Tour (2026)
- Tors
