= Jacek Kochan =

Polish musician (born 1955)

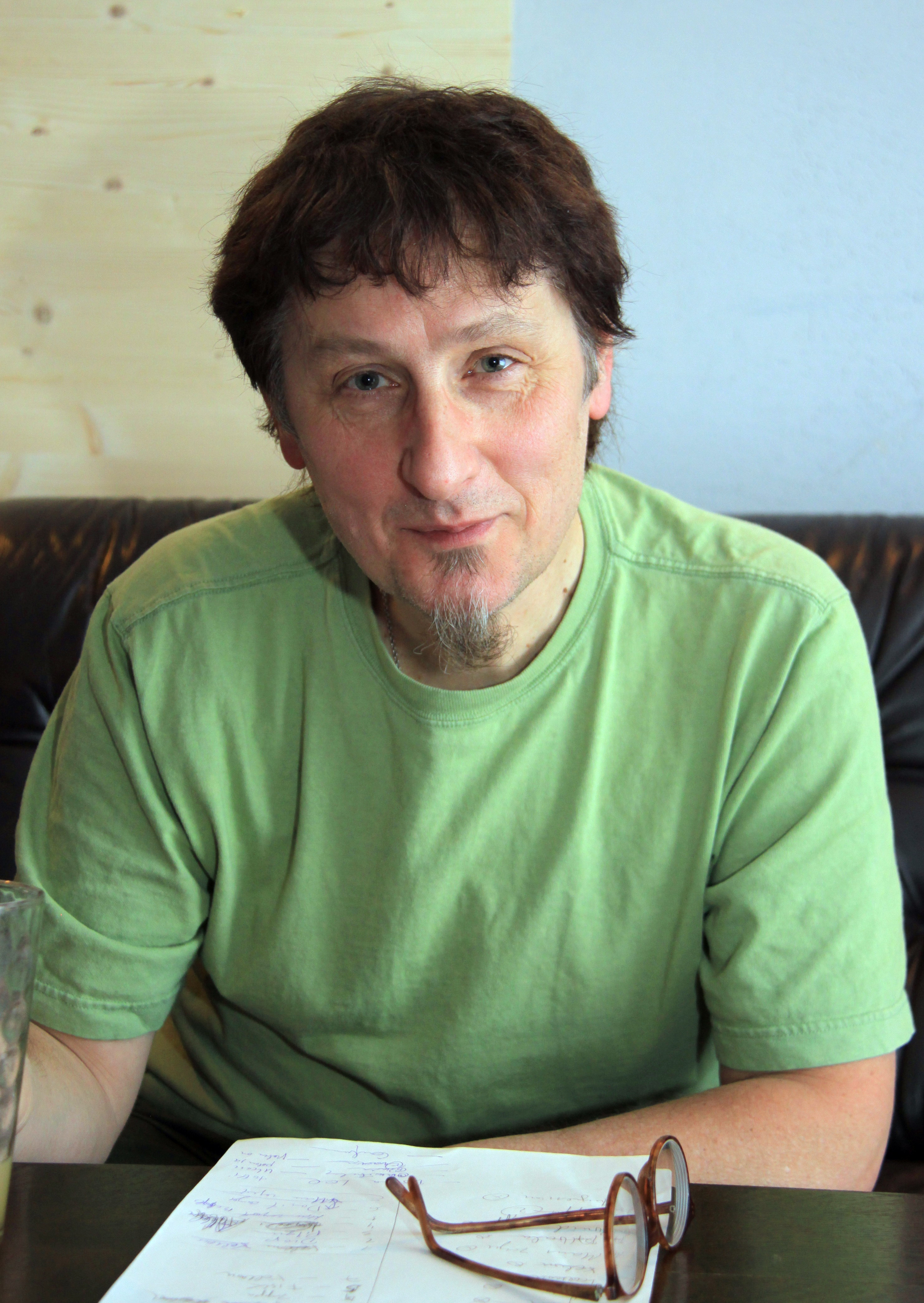

Background information
- Born: 1955 (age 70–71); Poland
- Genres: Jazz
- Occupations: Musician, composer, arranger
- Instrument: Percussion
- Labels: Unity; Counterpoint; GOWI; Not Two; Bomba; Intuition

Jacek Kochan (born 1955) is a Polish-born drummer, composer, arranger and music producer. After having started his adventures in music in Poland in the seventies, he moved in the early eighties first to New York City and then to Canada. There he worked with among many others Michel Donato, Karen Young, Andrew Leroux, Yannick Rieu, Oliver Jones, Jean-Pierre Zanella, Michel Cusson, John Abercrombie, Jerry Bergonzi, Pat Labarbera and Kenny Wheeler.

In 1995, he returned to Europe where he continued to compose, play, tour and record music with artists like Brian Conlon Dave Liebman, Greg Osby, Marc Copland, Gary Thomas, Joey Calderazzo, Palle Mikkelborg and Eddie Henderson. Kochan has released several albums as a leader. Among those are One Eyed Horse (2004) and Yearning (2006).
