= Maciej Obara =

Polish jazz saxophonist, composer and bandleader

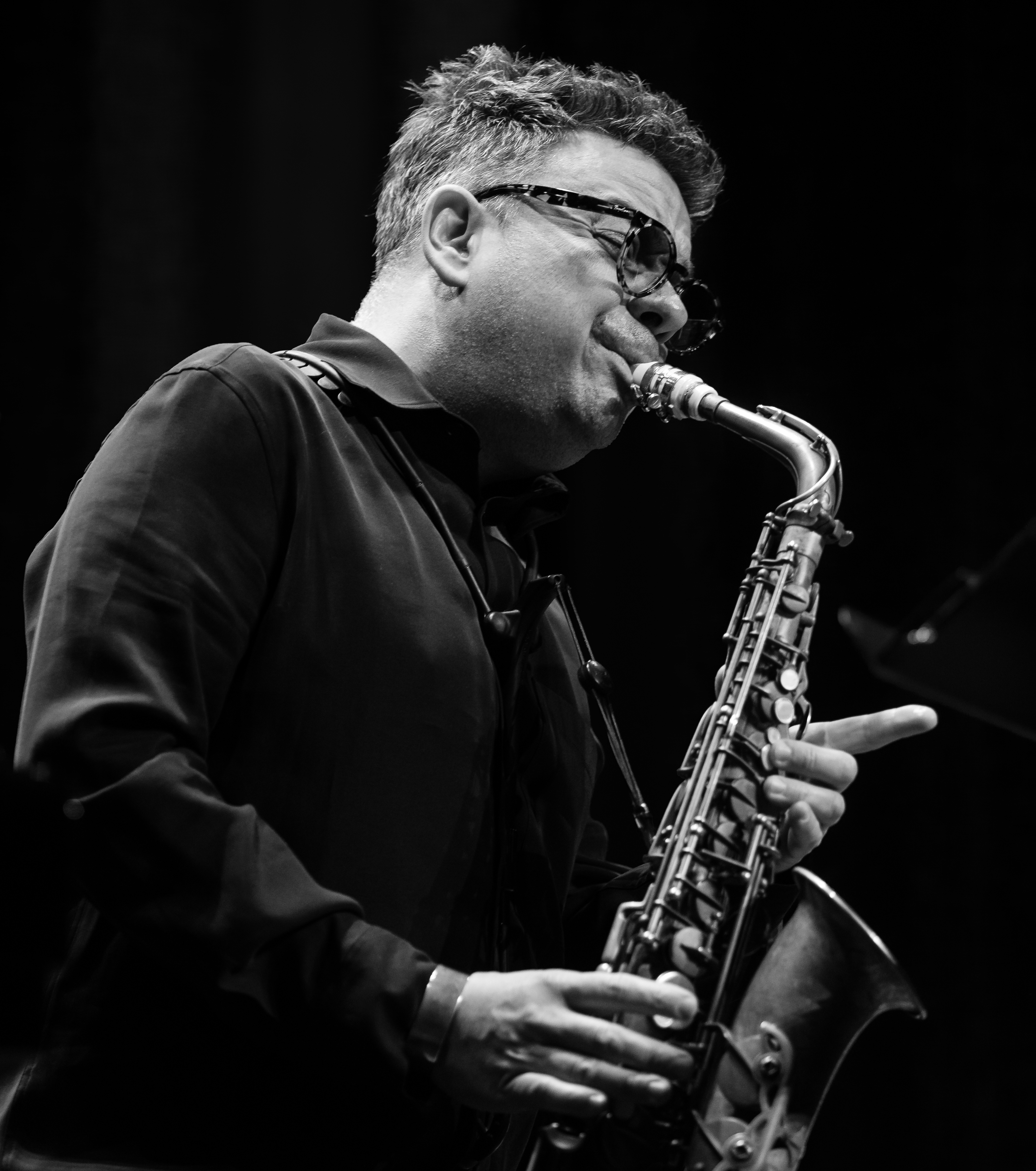
- Maciej Obara performing in 2026; Photo: Tore Sætre

Background information
- Born: 18 December 1981 (age 44)
- Origin: Poland
- Genres: Jazz
- Occupations: Musician, composer
- Instrument: Saxophone
- Labels: ECM Records
- Website: www.maciejobara.com

Maciej Obara (born 18 December 1981) is a Polish jazz musician (alto and tenor saxophone), composer and bandleader.

== Biography ==
From the mid-2000s, Obara worked with Marek Kądziela's ensemble ADHD (mit Kasper Tom Christiansen, Piotr Damasiewicz, Rudi Mahal) and the band and Power of the Horns, and also recorded with several of his own projects, first with his own trio Message from Ohayo (2007, mit Krzysztof Gradziuk, and Maciej Garbowski). The music documented there won the jazz competition of Bielska Zadymka for young jazz bands in 2006, and led to his international breakthrough. In 2008 he toured in Poland with Antoine Roney. Manfred Eicher became aware of him and recommended him to Tomasz Stańko, to play for the Tomasz Stańko Special Project and in New Balladyna Quartet. In the following years he continued with his own projects, in addition to another trio with John Lindberg und Harvey Sorgen (Three, 2010), with his Quartet (Equlilibrium, 2011, including Dominik Wania, Krzysztof Gradziuk, Maciej Garbowski) as well as the Obara International (Quartet) (with Dominik Wania, Gard Nilssen, Ole Morten Vågan, Tom Arthurs), with whom he has appeared internationally at numerous festivals since 2013 and has produced several albums, including a production of compositions by Krzysztof Komeda. He was also involved in recordings by Michael Jefry Stevens/Joe Fonda.

== Discography ==
=== Solo albums ===
Maciej Obara Trio

- 2007: Message from Ohayo (Polskie Radio Katowice), with Maciej Garbowski og Krzysztof Gradziuk
- 2009: I Can Do It (Jaz Records), with Maciej Garbowski og Krzysztof Gradziuk
- 2010: Three (Ars Cameralis), with John Lindberg og Harvey Sorgen

Obara Special Quartet

- 2010: Four (Ars Cameralis Silesiae Superior), with Mark Helias, Nasheet Venter og Ralph Alessi

Maciej Obara Quartet

- 2011: Equilibrium (Ars Cameralis Silesiae Superiors), with Maciej Garbowski, Krzysztof Gradziuk, and Dominik Wania
- 2017: Unloved (ECM Records), with Dominik Wania, Ole Morten Vågan and Gard Nilssen
- 2019: Three Crowns (ECM Records), with Dominik Wania, Ole Morten Vågan and Gard Nilssen
- 2023: Frozen Silence (ECM Records), with Dominik Wania, Ole Morten Vågan and Gard Nilssen

Obara Internasjonal (Dominik Wania, Gard Nilssen, Ole Morten Vågan, Tom Arthurs)

- 2013: Live at Manggha (For Tune)
- 2013: Komeda (For Tune),
- 2015: Live in Mińsk Mazowiecki (For Tune),

=== Collaborations ===
With The Fonda/Stevens Group Trio + 2 (Ireneusz Wojtczak, Michael Jefry Stevens, Joe Fonda, Michael Zerang, Harvey Sorgen)

- 2009: Live in Katowice (Not Two)

With Power Of The Horns

- 2011: Alaman (For Tune)

With Marek Kądziela ADHD

- 2015: In Bloom (For Tune)

With Silberman New Quintet

- 2015: Pieśń Gęsi Kanadyjskich (Audio Cave)
