= Siri Wålberg =

Norwegian musical artist performing as Sissy Wish (born 1980)

- Also known as: Sissy Wish
- Born: 17 October 1980 (age 45); Oppegård, Akershus
- Origin: Norway
- Genres: Pop
- Occupation: Singer songwriter
- Instruments: Vocals, piano, guitar
- Years active: 2000–present
- Labels: Sony Music; SissyMusic
- Website: sissywish.com

Siri Wålberg (born 17 October 1980 in Oppegård, Norway) is a Norwegian musical artist performing as Sissy Wish.

== Career ==
Wålberg studied music at Trøndertun Folk High School (1999/2000). In 2003 she won the NRK Urørt competition at by:Larm for the single The Six Feet Tall. The year after she released the album You May Breathe (2004), recipient of the 2004 Spellemannprisen award in the category best Female pop artist. In 2005 she released her second album Tuning In followed up in 2007 with a third album Beauties Never Die.

== Honors ==
- 2004: Spellemannprisen in the category best Female pop artist, for the album You May Breathe

== Discography ==
=== Albums ===
- 2004: You May Breathe... (Bauta Recordings, Tuba Records)
- 2005: Tuning In (Bauta Recordings, Tuba Records)
- 2007: Beauties Never Die (Sissy Music, Sony Music)
- 2013: Happy Monster (SissyMusic)

=== Singles/EP's ===
- 2003: The Six Feet Tall EP (Bauta Recordings, Tuba Records)
- 2007: Table 44 7" (Sissy Music)
- 2008: DWTS 7" (Sissy Music)
- 2011: Dance All Night With You Single (Sissy Music)

=== Collaborations ===
With Sondre Lerche

- 2009: Heartbeat Radio (Rounder Records)

Awards
Preceded by Bertine Zetlitz	Recipient of the best Female Pop Solo Artist Spellemannprisen; 2004	Succeeded by Ane Brun
