= Øystein Moen =

Norwegian jazz pianist and composer (born 1980)

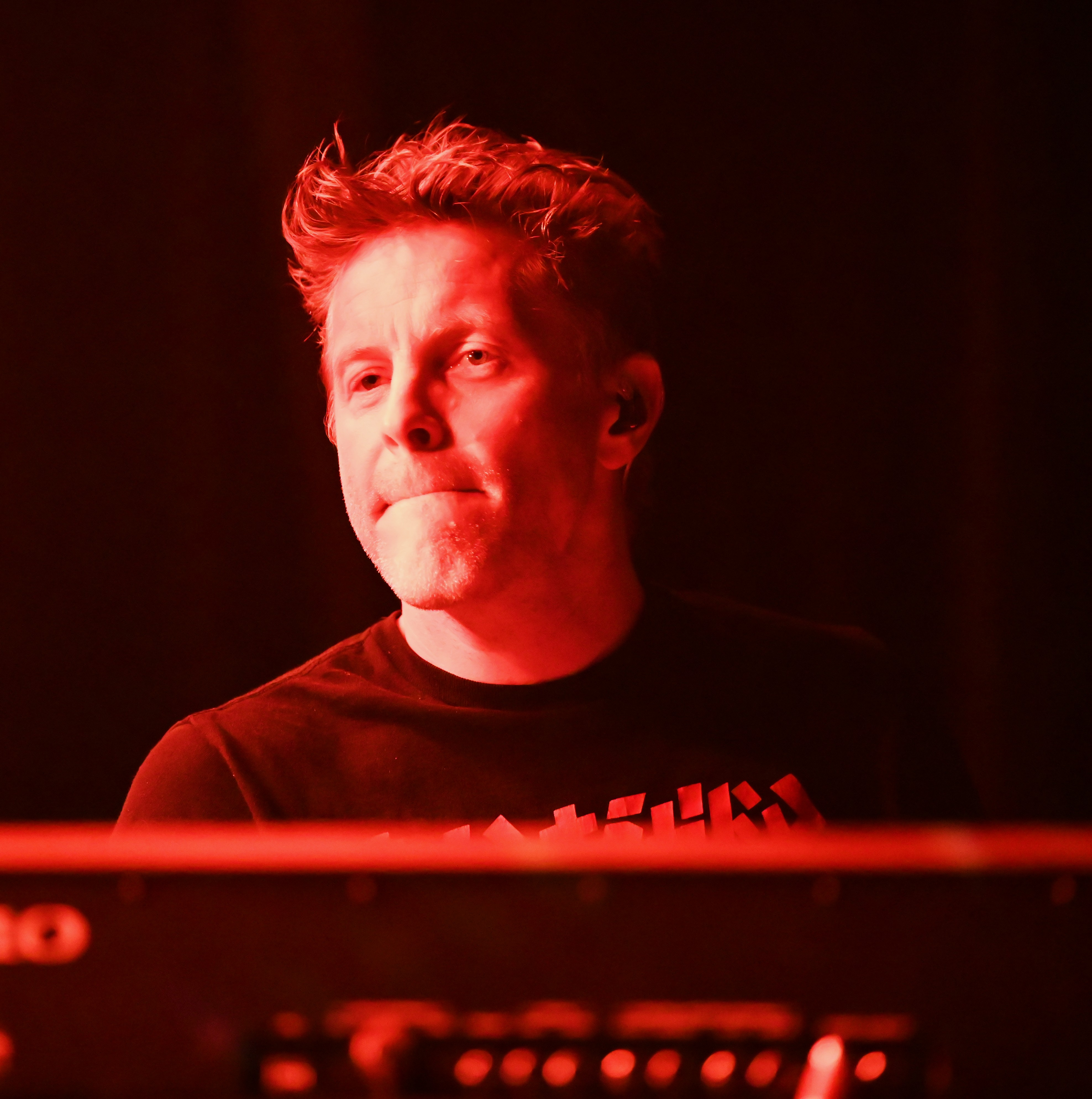
- Øystein Moen at Moldejazz 2026.

Background information
- Born: 16 August 1980 (age 46); Steinkjer Municipality, Nord-Trøndelag, Norway
- Genres: Jazz
- Occupations: Musician, composer
- Instruments: Piano, keyboards
- Labels: Rune Grammofon; Bolage Records
- Website: Øystein Moen on Myspace

Øystein Moen (born 16 August 1980) is a Norwegian jazz pianist and composer known for his participation in the bands Jaga Jazzist, Puma and Highasakite.

== Career ==
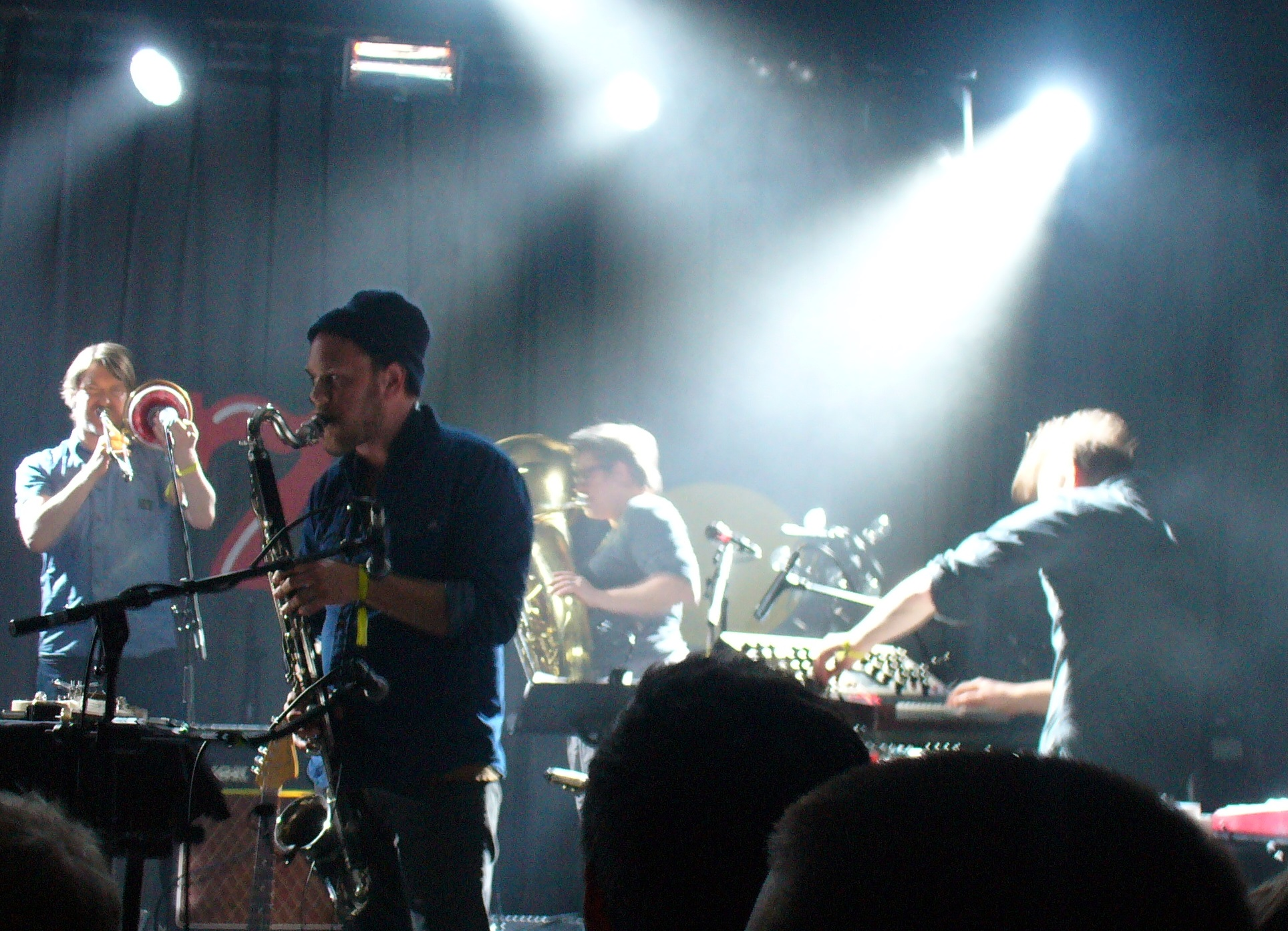
Moen with Jaga Jazzist in 2014

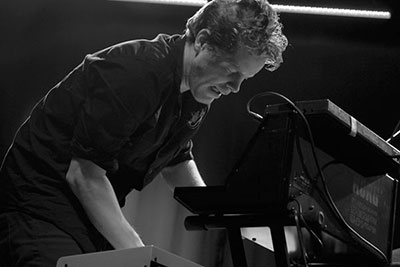
Øystein Moen

Moen was born in Steinkjer Municipality, and studied music on the Jazz program at Trondheim Musikkonsevatorium, where he and some fellow students started the band Puma, a cousin band musically to Supersilent. Puma is Øystein Moen (synthesizers and electronics), Stian Westerhus (guitar and electronics) and Gard Nilssen (drums). Their new album, Half Nelson Courtship (2010), shows a band with a stronger identity, clearer focus, more mature and fully developed musical ideas and directions. Puma is first and foremost a contemporary and progressive unit making their own path on the ever growing Norwegian experimental scene mixing improvisation, jazz, electronics and free rock. During his service in Bergen he met with drummer Isak Strand alias Me At Sea, and they initiated a cooperation resulting in performance on the Ekkofestivalen 2005, an electronica festival in Bergen, leading to the album Moen Meets Me At Sea (2005).

In 2008 Moen started his Jaga Jazzist performances, leading to a series of festival appearances. He has also appeared with Susanne Sundfør with two other Norwegian keyboardists Morten Qvenild and Christian Wallumrød, at the Oslo Jazzfestival 2011. The commissioned work for this year's Ekkofestivalen is composed by Stian Westerhus and Moen, both members of Jaga Jazzist and Puma, both experimental musicians who really enjoy themselves when allowed to play and find new musical landscapes. On vocals they are joined by vocalist Susanne Sundfør.

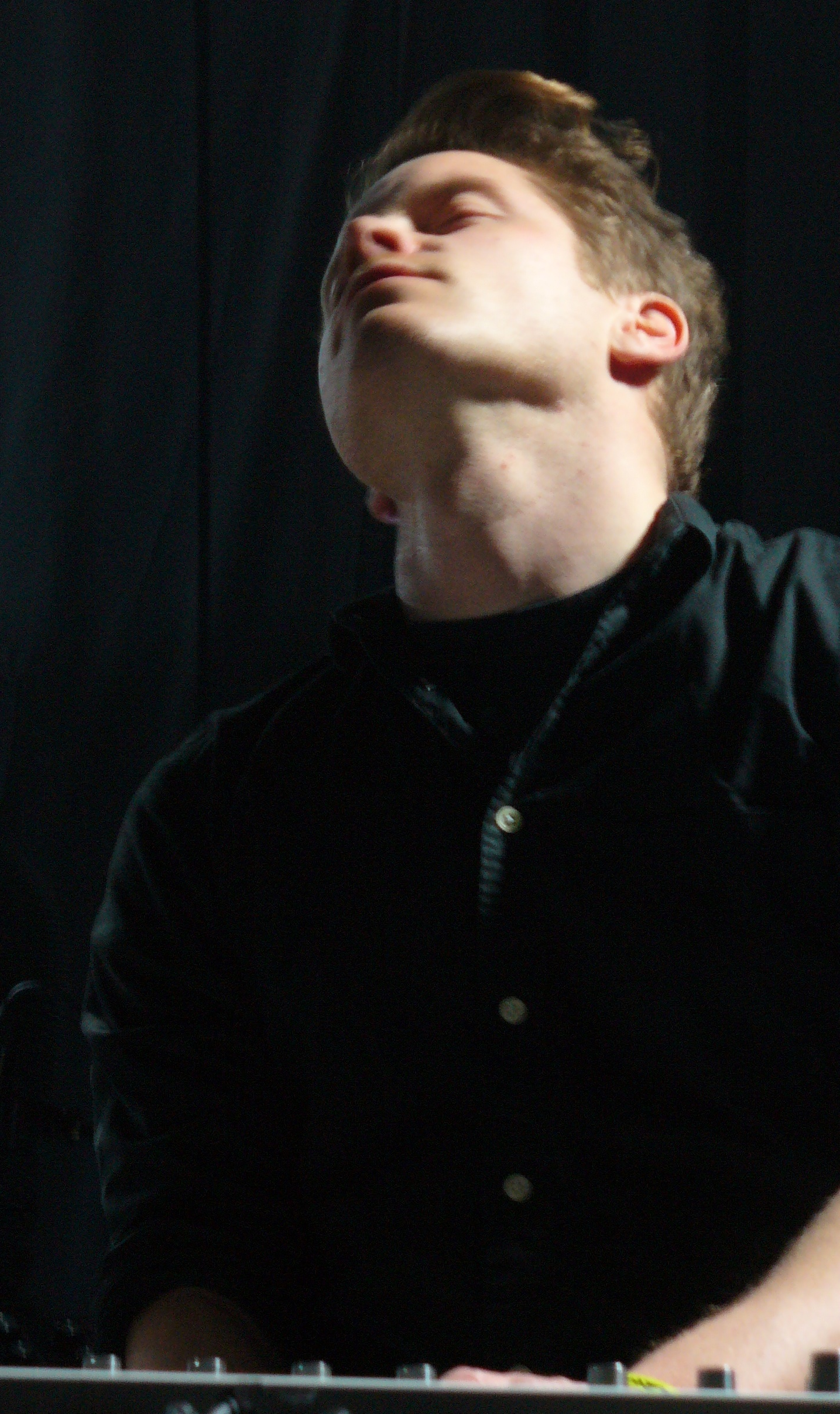
Øystein Moen at Vossajazz 2014.

== Honors ==
- This year's young jazz musicians 2006 with Puma at Moldejazz, awarded by Rikskonsertene and Norsk Jazzforum.
- Finalist in Young Nordic Jazz Comets 2006 in Reykjavík, Iceland

== Discography ==
With Me At Sea

- Moen Meets Me At Sea (Knott Records, 2005)

Within Puma

- 2007: Isolationism (Bolage Records)
- 2008: Discotheque Bitpunching (Bolage Records)
- 2009: Fist Full of Knuckles (Knuckleman Records), with Lasse Marhaug
- 2010: Half Nelson Courtship (Rune Grammofon)

With Jaga Jazzist

- 2010: One-Armed Bandit (Ninja Tune)
- 2013: Live with Britten Sinfonia (Ninja Tune)

With Susanne Sundfør

- 2011: A Night At Salle Pleyel (EMI Music, Norway)

With Stian Westerhus & Pale Horses

- 2014: Maelstrom (Rune Grammofon)
