= Skatebård =

- Born: Bård Aasen Lødemel
- Origin: Norway
- Genres: Electronica; Techno; House
- Years active: 2002—present
- Labels: Digitalo Enterprises, Radius Records, Supersoul Recordings, Tellè Records, Keys of Life Finland, Sex Tags Mania, PinaDgreitt Records, Playback Recordings

Skatebård is the pseudonym of the Norwegian DJ and producer Bård Aasen Lødemel. Skatebård was born in 1976 in Harstad, grew up in Hovdebygda, but has since relocated to Bergen. Skatebård is well known for being a part of the hip-hop act Side Brok formed together with Sjef R and Thorstein Hyl III, but he is also a notable electronic artist who generally fits into the Italo disco genre. Skatebård is the founder of the record label Digitalo Enterprises.

== Selected discography ==
- (2015) Skatebård - CDIII (Balsa Wood)
- (2011) Skatebård - Vill Stil (Digitalo Enterprises)
- (2010) Skatebård - The Starwatcher EP (Luna Flicks)
- (2008) Skatebård - Cosmos (Digitalo Enterprises)
- (2007) Skatebård - Love Attack EP (Digitalo Enterprises)
- (2007) Skatebård - Marimba/Pagans (Supersoul Recordings)
- (2007) Skatebård - Vuelo EP (Radius Belgium)
- (2006) Skatebård - June Nights South of Siena (Sex Tags Mania)
- (2006) Skatebård - Midnight Magic (Digitalo Enterprises)
- (2006) Skatebård - Flashes in the Night (Digitalo Enterprises)
- (2005) Skatebård - Conga (Sex Tags Mania)
- (2003) Skatebård - Future (Keys of Life Finland)
- (2002) Skatebård - Skateboarding was a crime (in 1989) (Tellè Records/Tellektro)

== Remixography ==
- (2012) Omar V & Robin C - "Complete (Skatebård Remix)" - [12" Full Pupp]
- (2008) Annie - "Two Of Hearts (Skatebård's High Energy In The Night Remix)" [CD Universal-Island Records]
- (2008) Sally Shapiro - "He Keeps Me Alive (Skatebård Remix)" [CD Paper Bag Records]
- (2007) Datarock - "Fa Fa Fa (Skatebård Remix)" [12" Network (record label)]
- (2007) Frost - "One Hundred Years (Skatebård Remix)" [CD Frostworld Recordings]
- (2007) The Wörk - "Just Talk (Skatebård Remix)"
- Au Revoir Simone - "Fallen Snow (Skatebård Remix)"
- Simian Mobile Disco - "Hustler (Skatebård Remix)"
