= Vinnie Who =

Danish singer

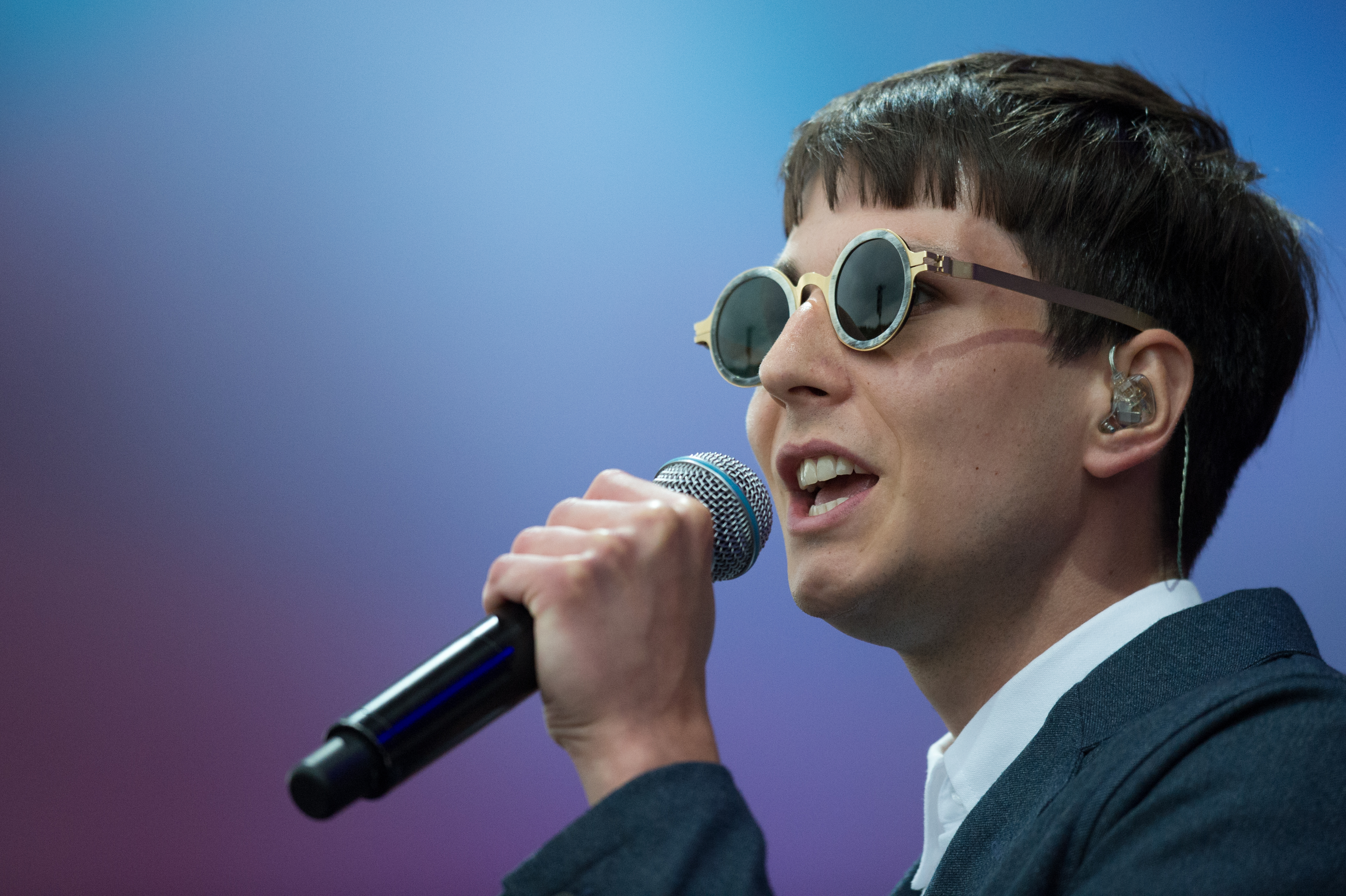
- Vinnie Who during the Roskilde Festival (2013)

Background information
- Born: Niels Bagge Hansen; 1 November 1987 (age 38); Solrød Strand, Denmark
- Genres: Indie pop, disco music
- Occupations: Singer, songwriter, musician
- Years active: 2010 – present
- Labels: EMI; Tiger Music
- Website: www.vinniewho.dk

Niels Bagge Hansen (better known by the stage name Vinnie Who; born 1 November 1987) is a Danish indie pop and disco singer and songwriter. Who has released three albums, and is currently signed to his independent record label Initiated Records. An androgynous male singer, he sings in a distinctive high-pitched feminine voice.

== Awards and nominations ==
In 2011, Vinnie Who was nominated for three Danish Music Awards, namely for "best Male Danish Artist", "Best Newcomer" and "Best Danish Album of the Year" for his Then I Met You album.

== In popular culture ==
In 2013, he also served as an advisor to judge Thomas Blachman in the sixth season of the Danish X Factor music reality show .

== Discography ==
=== Albums ===
Year	Album	Peak positions	Certification
Year	Album	DEN	Certification
2010	Then I Met You	11	
2013	Midnight Special	4	
2015	Harmony		

=== EPs ===
- 2011: A Step

=== Singles ===
Year	Single	Peak positions	Album
Year	Single	DEN	Album
2010	"Remedy"	36	Then I Met You
2024	"So Real Surreal"		
