= Stian Westerhus =

Norwegian guitarist

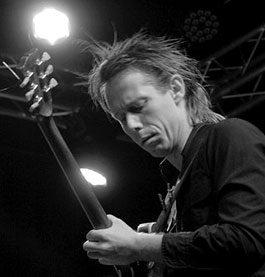

Background information
- Born: 2 April 1979 (age 47); Steinkjer, Nord-Trøndelag, Norway
- Genres: Jazz
- Occupation: Musician
- Instrument: Guitar
- Website: stianwesterhus.com

Stian Westerhus (born 2 April 1979) is a Norwegian guitarist known for his experimental style, explored with keyboardist Øystein Moen in the bands Jaga Jazzist and Puma and with Sidsel Endresen, Nils Petter Molvær, Arve Henriksen, Jan Bang, and Ingar Zach.

== Career ==
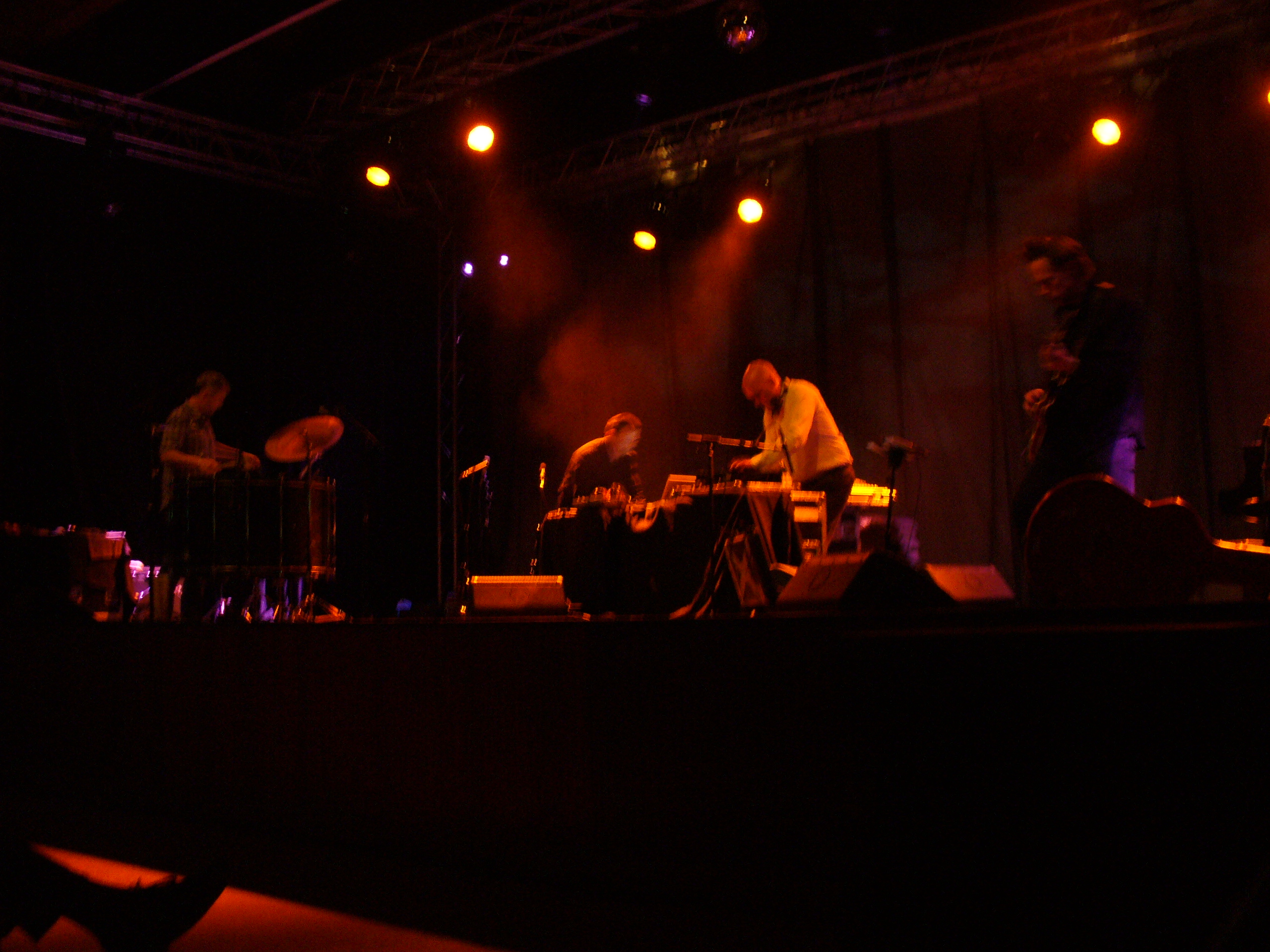
Henriksen/Bang/Westerhus/Zach at Vossajazz April 11, 2014.

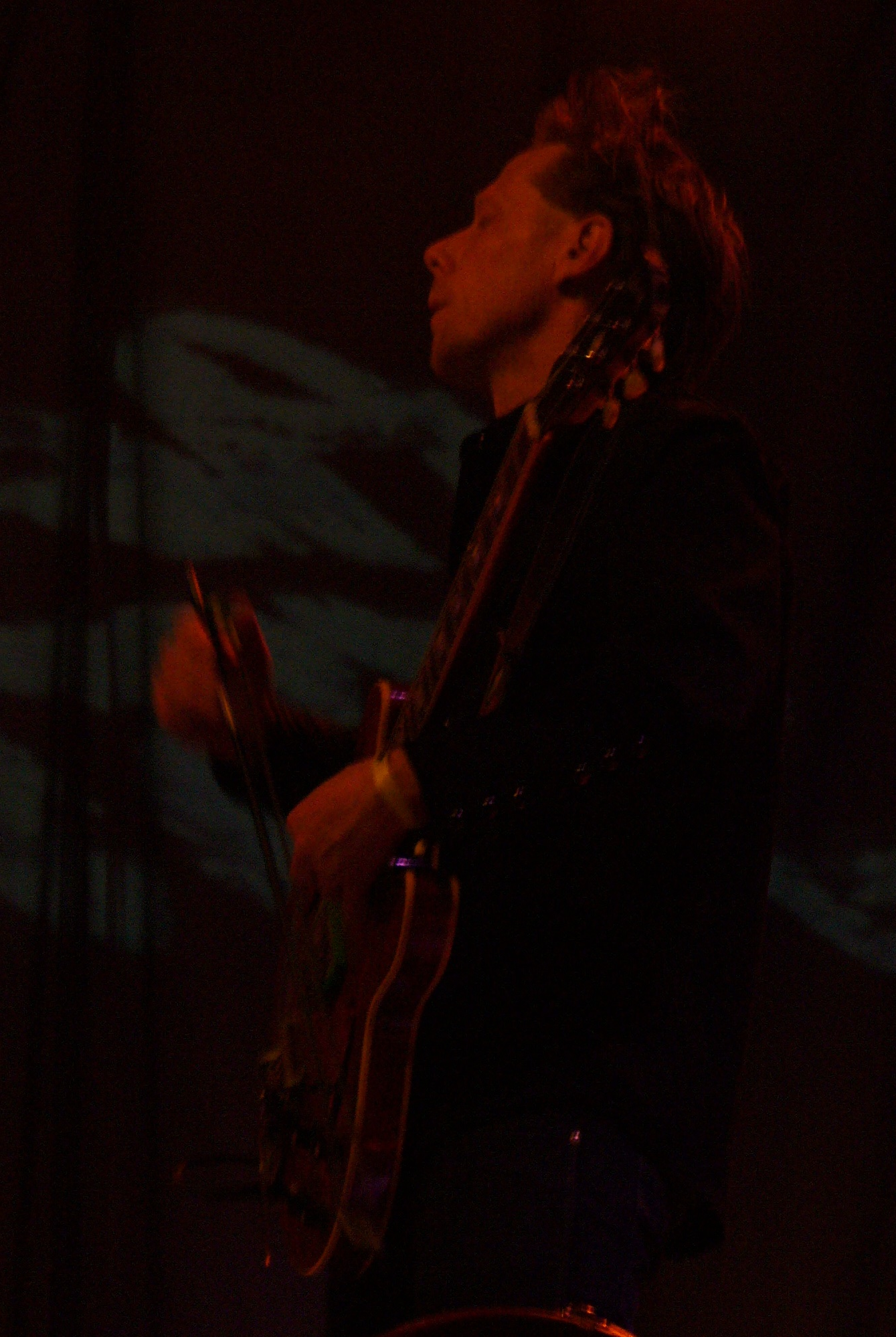
Stian Westerhus at Vossajazz 2014.

Westerhus holds a bachelor in jazz from Middlesex University under Stuart Hall, and a master from the Jazz program at Trondheim Musikkonservatorium, (NTNU, 2005).

He was first recognised by a broader audience within the experimental jazz band Puma, with whom he released four albums. The soloalbum Pitch Black Star Spangled (2010) on Rune Grammofon got some attention in reviews.

The album Didymoi Dreams (2012) is his debut as a duo with experimental jazz singer Sidsel Endresen. They have been of great inspiration to new experimental Norwegian musicians like Natalie Sandtorv and Torgeir Standal in The Jist duo.

== Gallery ==
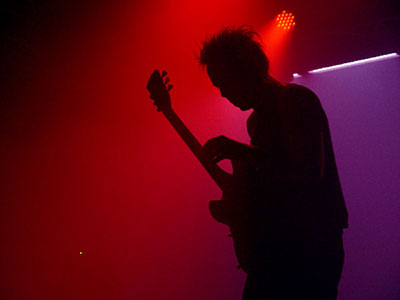

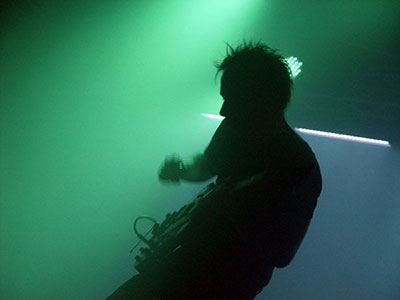

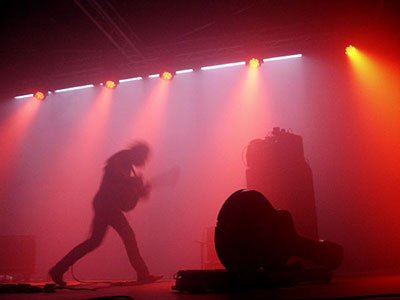

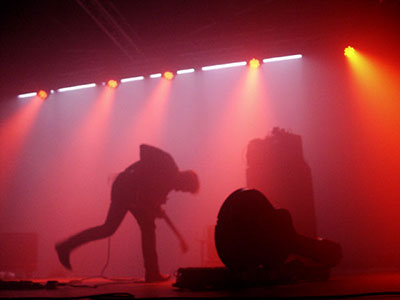

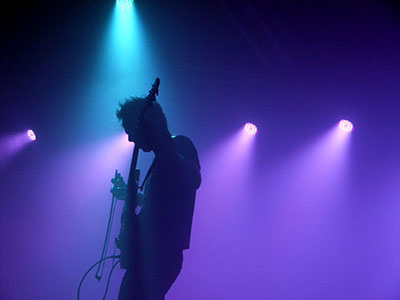

== Honors ==
- Spellemannprisen 2012, in the class Jazz together with Sidsel Endresen, for the album Didymoi Dreams

== Discography ==
=== Solo albums ===
- 2009: Galore (Rune Grammofon/The Last Record Company)
- 2010: Pitch Black Star Spangled (Rune Grammofon)
- 2012: The Matriarch and the Wrong Kind of Flowers (Rune Grammofon)
- 2016: Amputation (House of Mythology)
- 2020: Redundance (House of Mythology)
- 2023: SOTT (House of Mythology)

=== Collaborations ===
With Puma

- 2007: Isolationism (Bolage Records)
- 2008: Discotheque Bitpunching (Bolage Records)
- 2009: Fist Full of Knuckles with Lasse Marhaug (Knuckleman Records)
- 2010: Half Nelson Courtship (Rune Grammofon)

With Fraud

- 2007: Fraud (The Babel Labell UK)

With Terje Isungset

- 2008: Laden With Rain (FMR Records)
- 2015: Terje Isungset & Stian Westerhus (All Ice Records)

With Monolithic

- 2009: Black Science (RoggBif/Vendlus)

With Bladed

- 2009: Mangled Dreams (Crispin Glover Records)

With Eldbjørg Raknes and Eirik Hegdal

- 2009: From Frozen Feet Heat Came (MyRecordings)

With Sidsel Endresen

- 2012: Didymoi Dreams (Rune Grammofon)

With BOL

- 2012: Numb, Number (Gigafon)

With Pale Horses

- 2014: Maelstrom (Rune Grammofon), as Stian Westerhus & Pale Horses

With Ulver

- 2017: The Assassination of Julius Caesar (House of Mythology)

=== As producer ===
- 2010: Eldbjørg Raknes - Sense (MyRecordings)
- 2011: PELbO - Days of Transcendence (Riot Factory)
- 2012: Nils Petter Molvær - Baboon Moon (Sula Records)

== Awards and scholarships ==
- 2010 - Sparebank 1 SNM's jazz scholarship awarded at Moldejazz.
- 2008 - BBC’s Award for Innovation in Jazz with Fraud
- 2007 - Sparebank 1 SNM's jazz talent scholarship awarded at Moldejazz
- 2007 - Ronnie Scott's Award for Best Newcomer 2007 (UK) with Fraud
- 2006 - Trondheim Jazz Festival's talent prize with Bladed
- 2006 - Moldejazz's young jazz musician of the year with Puma

Awards
Preceded by Ola Kvernberg	Recipient of the Jazz Spellemannprisen; 2012	Succeeded by Karin Krog & John Surman
