= Puma (band) =

Norwegian jazz band

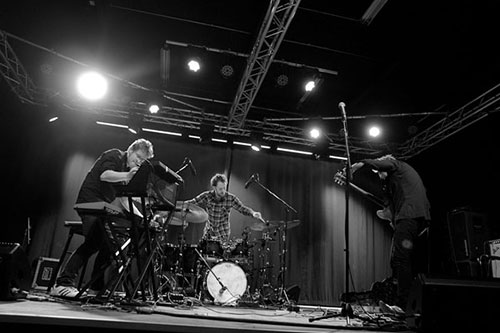

Background information
- Origin: Trondheim, Norway
- Genres: Jazz; Electronica; Experimental rock
- Years active: 2005–present
- Labels: Rune Grammofon
- Members: Stian Westerhus; Gard Nilssen; Øystein Moen

Puma (established 2005 in Trondheim, Norway) is an experimental jazz band.

== Biography ==
Puma's music is described as energetic and intense, and they have played a variety of concerts internationally and in Norway. They have been held up as one of the greatest talents in the new Norwegian improvised music.

In 2007 Puma began a collaboration with sound artist Lasse Marhaug, for the celebration of Grieg anniversary 07.

== Band members ==
- Stian Westerhus (guitar)
- Gard Nilssen (drums)
- Øystein Moen (keyboards)

== Honors ==
- 2006: Puma was awarded Årets unge jazzmusikere, by Rikskonsertene and Norsk Jazzforum
- 2006: Finalist in the Young Nordic Jazz Comets, held in Reykjavík on Island

== Discography ==
- 2007: Isolationism (Bolage Records)
- 2008: Discotheque Bitpunching (Bolage Records)
- 2009: Fist Full of Knuckles (Knuckleman Records), with Lasse Marhaug
- 2010: Half Nelson Courtship (Rune Grammofon)
