= Signe Førre =

Norwegian singer, bassist, and composer

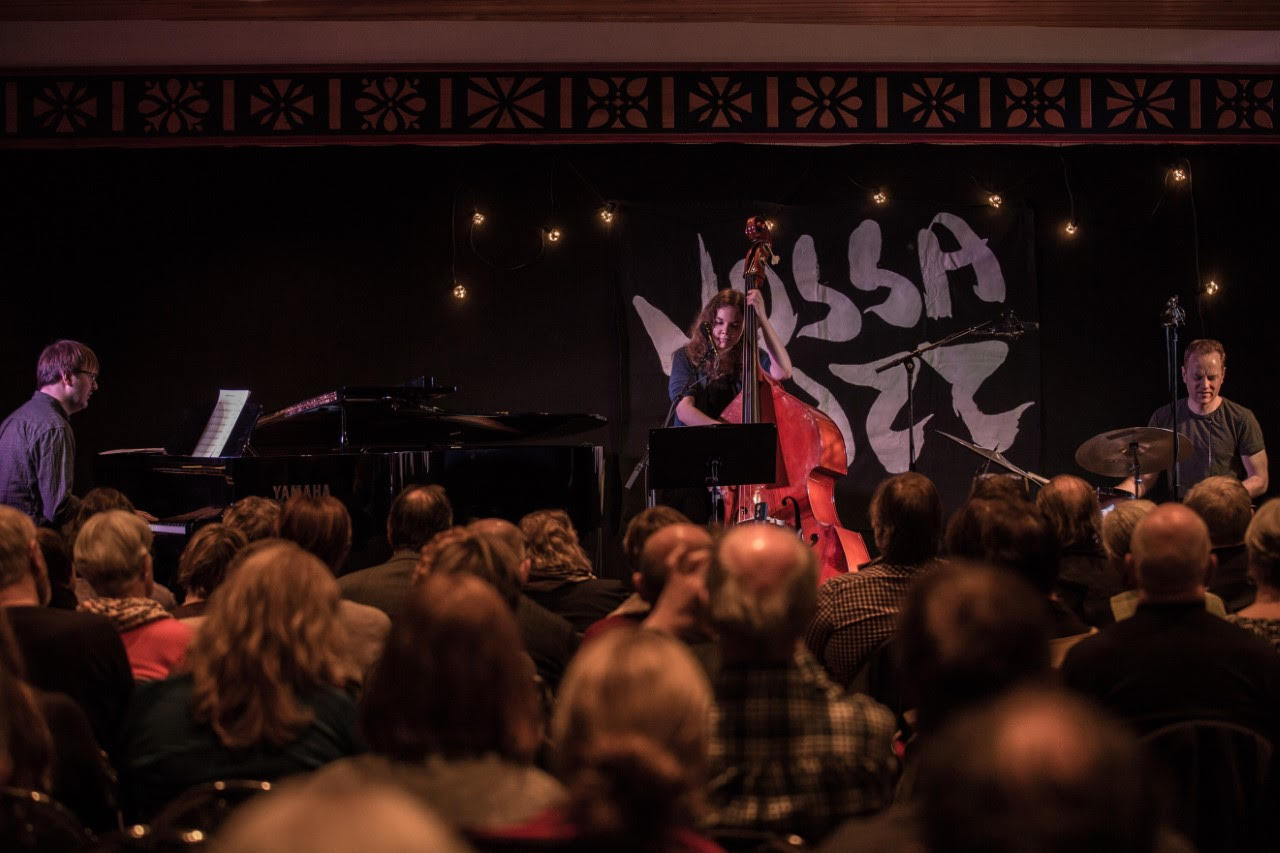
- Signe Førre at Vossa Jazz 2018

Background information
- Born: Signe Elisabeth Lygre Førre; 3 May 1994 (age 32); Voss Municipality, Hordaland, Norway
- Genres: Jazz, Folk music, World music
- Occupations: Singer, musician, composer
- Instruments: Vocals, upright bass

Signe Elisabeth Lygre Førre (born 3 May 1994) is a Norwegian singer, upright bassist, and composer from Voss, Norway.

== Biography ==
Førre was born in Voss Municipality. She studied jazz at Voss Jazzskule. Her debut concert as band leader was at Vossajazz 2014 with Signe Førre Band. The lineup in addition to Førre, was saxophonist Elisabeth Lid Trøen, pianist Eivind Austad, and drummer Håkon Mjåset Johansen. In 2015 she played with the band Peace, Love and Swing, at Vossajazz, showing herself as composer. At the 2018 Vossajazz Førre appeared with her own trio playing a mixture of standards, her own compositions, and old folk tunes. The trio included additional pianist Erlend Slettevoll and drummer Håkon Mjåset Johansen.

Førres debut album Fagert was released in 2024, by Ta:lik Records. The album is composed of multicultural folk music, from Norway, Turkey, and the Balkans. Two tracks of the album has been placed in rotation on the Norwegian radio station NRK Folkemusikk, which is the folk music radio station run by the national Norwegian broadcasting corporation.

== Honors ==
- 2014: Awarded the UNGjaJAZZja by Vossajazz, with Signe Førre Band
