= Trygve Waldemar Fiske =

Norwegian jazz musician

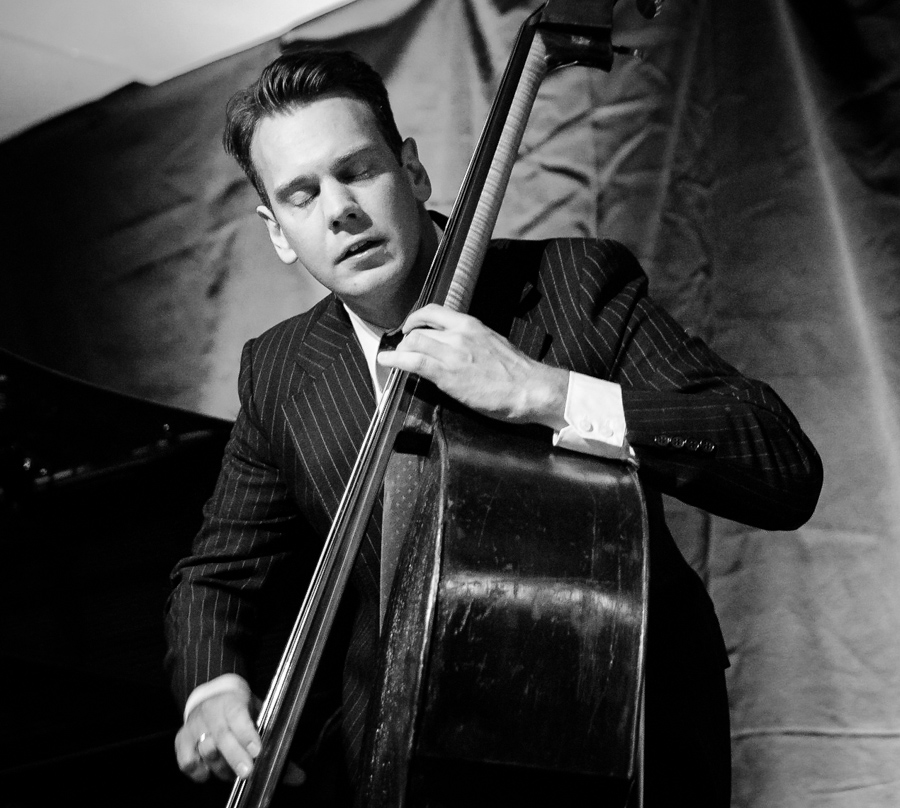
- Fiske with Hanna Paulsberg at Kongsberg Jazzfestival 2018.

Background information
- Born: 15 February 1987 (age 39); Frei Municipality, Møre og Romsdal
- Origin: Norway
- Genres: Jazz
- Occupations: Musician, composer
- Instrument: Upright bass
- Label: Øra Phonogram
- Website: Trygve Waldemar Fiske on Myspace

Trygve Waldemar Fiske (born 15 February 1987 in Frei Municipality, Norway) is a Norwegian jazz musician (upright bass), known from different Norwegian jazz bands and recordings.

== Career ==
Fiske was educated on the jazz program at Trondheim Musikkonsevatorium, and the Norwegian Academy of Music. He played in Heidi Skjerve Quartet Vegen Åt Deg (2012) and Hanna Paulsberg Concept Waltz For Lilli (2012). After receiving the Shell Oil Company's Jazz Scholarship in 2013, Fiske started up his own quartet, Waldemar 4. They have offered performances at Norwegian jazz festivals like Moldejazz and the Kongsberg Jazz Festival, and released their self-titled debut album in 2015.

== Honors ==
- 2013: Shell's Jazz Scholarship

== Discography ==
=== Solo albums ===
Within Waldemar 4

- 2015: Waldemar 4 (Gigafon Records)

=== Collaborations ===
Within the Heidi Skjerve Quartet

- 2012: Vegen Åt Deg (Øra Fonogram), including John Pål Inderberg & Vigleik Storaas

Within the Hanna Paulsberg Concept

- 2012: Waltz For Lilli (Øra Fonogram), including Oscar Grönberg & Hans Hulbækmo
- 2014: Song For Josia (Øra Fonogram), including Oscar Grönberg & Hans Hulbækmo

With Ine Hoem

- 2015: Angerville (Propeller Recordings)
