= Jon Rune Strøm =

Norwegian jazz musician (born 1985)

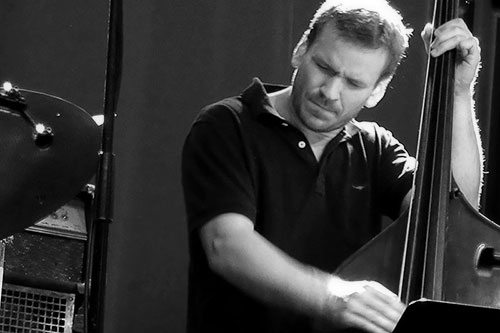
- Strøm with Paal Nilssen-Love at Large Unit in 2015.

Background information
- Born: 29 January 1985 (age 41); Namsos Municipality, Trøndelag
- Origin: Norway
- Genres: Jazz
- Occupations: Jazz musician, composer
- Instruments: Upright bass, bass guitar
- Label: Stone Floor Records
- Formerly of: Friends & Neighbors

Jon Rune Strøm (born 29 January 1985) is a Norwegian jazz musician (upright bass, bass guitar).

== Biography ==
Strøm was born in Namsos Municipality, and was raised on an island in the north-western coast of Norway. His early influences included Gary Peacock and Frode Gjerstad, and he participated in the album East of the West (2011), the Kjersti Stubø album How High Is the Sky (2011), he collaborates on the Norwegian Free Jazz scene with Paal Nilssen-Love's band Large Unit, Petter Wettre and with Mats Gustafsson's Nu Ensemble, further with musicians like Mats Äleklint, John Dikeman, Martin Küchen, Thomas Johansson and Tollef Østvang in different constellations like the SAKA Trio, Universal Indians, All Included and Friends & Neighbors. In 2013 he released the solo album Jøa.

== Discography ==
=== Solo albums ===
- 2013: Gøa (Stone Floor Records)

=== Collaborations ===
With Kjersti Stubø

- 2011: How High Is the Sky (Bolage)

With SAKA trio (Dag Erik Knedal Andersen, Kristoffer Berre Alberts)

- 2011: Posh?! (FMR Records)
- 2012: Cementen (Stone Floor Records)

With Friends & Neighbors (Tollef Østvang, Oscar Grönberg, André Roligheten, Thomas Johansson)

- 2011: No Beat Policy (Øra Fonogram)
- 2014: Hymn For A Hungry Nation (Clean Feed)

With Frode Gjerstad Trio

- 2011: Mir (Circulasione Totale)
- 2011: East Of West (Circulasione Totale)
- 2012: Hide Out (PNL)
- 2014: Russian Standard (Not Two Records)
- 2015: Miyazaki (FMR Records)
- 2015: At Constellation (Circulasione Totale), with Steve Swell

With Universal Indian (Tollef Østvang, John Dikeman)

- 2012: Nihil Is Now (Stone Floor Records)
- 2014: Skullduggery (Clean Feed), with Joe McPhee

With All Included (Tollef Østvang, Martin Küchen, Mats Äleklint, Thomas Johansson)

- 2012: Reincarnation Of A Free Bird (Stone Floor Records)
- 2015: Satan In Plain Clothes (Clean Feed)

With Mats Gustafsson & NU Ensemble (Ingebrigt Haker Flaten, Per Ake Holmlander, Kjell Nordeson, Agustí Fernández, Christer Bothenm, Joe McPhee, Peter Evans, Stine Janvind Motland, Paal Nilssen-Love)

- 2013: Hidros6: Solos, Duos, Groups (Not Two Records)
- 2014: Hidros6: Knockin (Not Two Records)

With Paal Nilssen-Love) Large Unit

- 2014: Erta Ale (PNL)

With Martin Küchen, Tollef Østvang

- 2015: Melted Snow (NoBusiness Records)

With Keefe Jackson, Josh Berman, Tollef Østvang

- 2015: Southern Sun (NoBusiness Records)

== See also ==
- List of jazz bassists
