= Odd Magne Gridseth =

Norwegian jazz musician (1959–2025)

- Born: 27 April 1959; Ørsta, Sunnmøre, Norway
- Origin: Norway
- Died: 22 April 2025 (aged 65) Ørsta, Sunnmøre, Norway
- Genres: Jazz
- Occupations: Jazz musician, composer
- Instruments: Upright bass, bass guitar

Odd Magne Gridseth (27 April 1959 – 22 April 2025) was a Norwegian musician, known as a bassist from the Trondheim music scene.

== Life and career ==
Gridseth was regular bassist in the band «Soundtrip» together with guitarist Ove Bjørken, drummer Ernst-Wiggo Sandbakk and keyboardist Jan Gunnar Hoff, a collaboration that was continued with the ensemble «Trondheim Bop-service», which included Ernst-Wiggo Sandbakk, Odd André Elveland (tenor saxophone), Ove Bjørken, Torgeir Andresen (trumpet) and Kåre Kolve (alto saxophone). He was also part of Kjersti Stubø Band, and achieved international fame through being part of Siri Gellein's Svaleband (1987–), while attending the Jazz program at Trondheim Conservatory of Music (NTNU).

Otherwise, he was occasionally in «Brand new sisters» (1984–1988). He also attended the releases Herberget sannheten (1987) by Hans Rotmo, Blodig Alvor (NaNaNaNa) (1988), Splitter Pine (1989), and Pstereo (1990) with DumDum Boys, The Song We Forgot / Mijjen Vuelieh (1991) with Frode Fjellheim, Vårsøg (1991) with Henning Sommerro, Rai Rai (1993) with D.D.E., The Music Machine (1996) with Gunnar Andreas Berg, and Landstryker (1996) with Ove Bjørken.

Gridseth died in Ørsta, Sunnmøre on 22 April 2025, at the age of 65.

== Discography ==
=== DumDum Boys ===
- 1988: Blodig Alvor Na Na Na Na Na (CBS)
- 1989: Splitter Pine (CBS)
- 1990: Pstereo (CBS)

=== Siri's Svale Band ===
- 1990: Blackbird (Sonor Records)
- 1997: Necessarily So… (Sonor Records)
- 2007: Best of Siri's Svale Band (Mesa Music)

=== Other collaborations ===
- 1985: You Say... (CMS Records), with Castberg & Co
- 1987: Herberget Sannheten (Plateselskapet), with Ola Uteligger
- 1988: På Frifot (Plateselskapet), with Nellie Neuf & Knutsen
- 1989: Sorgens Bar (Plateselskapet), with Ola Uteligger
- 1991: Humbug & Campari (Plateselskapet), with Feskhandler Thorske
- 1991: The Song We Forgot / Mijjen Vuelieh (Iđut), with Frode Fjellheim
- 1992: Mikis & Arja (Plateselskapet), with Mikis & Arja
- 1992: Slow Burning (Columbia Records), with James Knudsen
- 1993: Supernatural (Norsk Plateproduksjon), with Gunnar Andreas Berg
- 1993: Rai-Rai (Tylden & Co), with D.D.E.
- 1995: Kanskje Kommer Kongen (CNR), with Gustav Lorentzen
- 1996: The Music Machine (Curling Legs), with Gunnar Andreas Berg
- 1996: Landstryker (Sonor Records), with Ove Bjørken
- 1997: Vårsøg (Norske Gram), with Henning Sommerro
