= Mathias Stubø =

Norwegian musician and DJ (born 1992)

- Also known as: Proviant Audio
- Born: 6 April 1992 (age 34); Tønsberg
- Origin: Norway
- Genres: Electronica
- Occupations: Musician, composer
- Instrument: Multi instrumentalist
- Website: www.oslorecords.com/artists/proviantaudio

Mathias Stubø (born 6 April 1992 in Tønsberg, Norway) is a Norwegian musician and DJ in the genre electronica, also known as Proviant Audio. He is the son of jazz vocalist Kjersti Stubø, grandson of jazz guitarist Thorgeir Stubø and nephew of jazz guitarist Håvard and theater director Eirik Stubø.

== Career ==
At only fourteen years old Stubø was named this week's Urørt on NRK P3, and in 2010 he was nominated for Årets Urørt for the project Proviant Audio. He released the albums Real Love Tastes Like This! and 1979 in 2011, and the self-titled album Mathias Stubø in 2012, where the jazz trumpeter Kristoffer Eikrem appeared.

Stubø has already played together with his live band, at several major Norwegian festivals such as Hove Festival, Kongsberg Jazz Festival, Slottsfjellfestivalen, Moldejazz 2011 and by:Larm 2010.

== Discography ==
Album

- 2011: Real Love Tastes Like This! (Paper Recordings)
- 2011: 1979 (BBE Records)
- 2012: Mathias Stubø (BBE Records)
