= Urban Connection (album) =

2001 album by the Norwegian jazz band Urban Connection

Studio album by Frode Nymo Steinar Raknes Håkon Mjåset Johansen
- Released: 2001
- Genre: Jazz
- Length: 34:52
- Label: Bergland Production/Bare Bra Musikk
- Producer: Gunnar Andreas Berg

Urban Connection chronology
Urban Connection (2001)	French Only (2002)

Urban Connection (released 2001 in Oslo, Norway by Bergland Production/Bare Bra Musikk – BE0032) is a jazz album by the Norwegian jazz band Urban Connection.

== Critical reception ==
Professional ratings
Review scores
Source	Rating
Dagbladet	5/6 stars

Urban Connection played together for a long time before they released their self-titled debut album, and have established themselves as the best of the best in young Norwegian jazz both in Norway and internationally. Tomas Lauvland Pettersen in the Norwegian Jazz magazine «Ballade» states: "Their take on modern Konitzesque jazz is highly integral and utterly convincing on their third full-length outing ‘UC 3’. Bassist Raknes is not only able to swing and solo, he writes strong tunes with challenging harmonic and rhythmic twists that keep the listener on his toes throughout the recording".

The review by the Norwegian newspaper Dagbladet awarded the album 5 stars (dice).

== Honors ==
- Spellemannprisen 2001 in the class Jazz

== Track listing ==
1. "Turban Collection" (3:31) – written by Steinar Raknes
2. "Passion Dance" (6:00) – written by McCoy Tyner
3. "No Fret Blue Z" (4:38) – written by Steinar Raknes
4. "Song For Everyone" (3:30) – written by Frode Nymo, Håkon Mjåset Johansen, Steinar Raknes
5. "Drivers Escape" (4:44) – written by Steinar Raknes
6. "Blue Span" (9:47) – written by Steinar Raknes
7. "Oblivion" (2:32) – written by Steinar Raknes

== Personnel ==
- Alto Saxophone – Frode Nymo
- Bass – Steinar Raknes
- Drums – Håkon Mjåset Johansen

== Credits ==
- Producer and engineer – Gunnar Andreas Berg
- Engineer – Rune Holme
- Mastering – Skansen Lydstudio
- Recording – MIT-Studio
- Cover – Per Finne
