= Oofotr (album) =

1995 studio album by Oofotr

Studio album by Ernst-Wiggo Sandbakk Jørn Øien Kjersti Stubø John Pål Inderberg, Tore Brunborg Yngve Moe Ove Bjørken Børge Petersen-Øverleir
- Released: 1995
- Recorded: Hønsehuset Lydstudio, Bodø, December 1994
- Genre: Traditional folk music, Jazz
- Length: 41:00
- Label: Norske Gram
- Producer: Ernst-Wiggo Sandbakk

Oofotr chronology
Oofotr (1995)	Oofotr II (2001)

Oofotr (released 1995 by Norske Gram – Ekgcd 11) is a Norwegian studio album by the band Oofotr performing traditional music from Ofoten with a jazz influence.

== Personnel ==
Standard lineup

- Ernst-Wiggo Sandbakk – drums and percussions
- Jørn Øien – keyboards
- Kjersti Stubø – vocals

Additional musicians

- John Pål Inderberg alt saxophone
- Tore Brunborg – tenor saxophone
- Yngve Moe – bass guitar
- Ove Bjørken – violin
- Børge Petersen-Øverleir – guitar

== Track listing ==
1. «Hører du sangen...» (3:44), lyrics by Kjersti Stubø
2. «Alene Gud» (4:36)
3. «Sat i blomsten som en dronning» (2:10)
4. «Ofte I Trængsel og Motgangens Dage» (4:51)
5. «Hos Gud er Idel Glæde» (3:39), recorded live in "Kjeldebotn kirke"
6. «O Lam jeg Ser» (3:13)
7. «Astøingsvisa» (2:80)
8. «Ak mon min veg til kana'an» (4:14)
9. «Rypejægeren» (2:41)
10. «Pajeb Njuorajaure» (4:25), by Thorgeir Stubø
11. «Voggesang» (4:42)

== Credits ==
- All melodies are arranged by Jørn Øien & Ernst-Wiggo Sandbakk
- All melodies except 2, 10 & 11 are written down by Kaare Petersen in 1928
- Recorded at Hønsehuset Lydstudio, Bodø, December 1994
- Sound engineers Are B. Simonsen & Jøran Johnsen
- Toppings made at Sigma Studio, Bergen, Lydmakeriet A/S, Tønsberg, and Nidaros Studio, Trondheim
- Mastered by Rune Nordal
- Studio recordings mixed at Nidaros Studio by Kjell Ove Grimsmo
- Cover design by Astrid Lien
- Cover photo by Merete Lien
