= Eivind Austad =

Norwegian jazz pianist

- Born: Eivind Waage Austad; 3 November 1973 (age 52); Bergen, Hordaland
- Origin: Norway
- Genres: Jazz
- Occupations: Musician, composer
- Instrument: Piano
- Label: Ozella
- Website: www.eivindaustad.no

Eivind Waage Austad (born 3 November 1973) is a Norwegian jazz pianist living in Bergen.

== Biography ==
Austad was born in Bergen, Norway, and attended the Jazz program at the Norwegian University of Science and Technology in Trondheim (NTNU), where he received a Bachelor's degree in jazz performance. Later he earned a Master's degree in Music teaching at the Bergen University College (Hib). He has been working as a freelance musician since the mid 1990s and has played in different musical settings and with musicians like Kjetil Møster, Thomas T. Dahl, Frode Alnæs, Sigurd Køhn, Elisabeth Lid Trøen, Ole Hamre, Håkon Mjåset Johansen, Frank Jakobsen, Ernst-Wiggo Sandbakk, Magne Thormodsæter, Signe Førre, and Sigvart Dagsland. His main jazz projects are his own Eivind Austad Trio and the jazz quartet Living Space, fronted by the saxophonist Kjetil Møster.

Austad released his debut solo album Moving in 2015, with his trio including bassist Magne Thormodsæter and drummer Håkon Mjåset Johansen. He also collaborates in projects with the multi-artist Ole Hamre, different kinds of theater groups, different band gigs, and as an accompanist for different singers and choirs. He is a long time faculty member of the Grieg Academy, where he holds a post as Associate Professor in jazz piano, ear training, arranging/composition, jazz history and ensemble.

== Discography ==
=== Solo albums ===
With Eivind Austad Trio

- 2015: Moving (Ozella)
- 2019: Northbound (Losen)
- 2022: Live in Oslo (Austad Music)
- 2024: Explore (Losen)

With Eivind Austad New Orleans Trio

- 2020: That feeling (Losen Records)

=== Collaborations ===
With Sølvi Helén Hopland

- 2001: Ein Løvetann (Gilead)

With Karin Park

- 2003: Superworldunknown (Waterfall Records, Universal)

With Vise menn

- 2004: «Forbud mot å fly» (In Productions)

With Tone Lise Moberg

- 2006: Looking On (NorCD)

With Ole Amund Gjersvik

- 2006: “Circus” (Acoustic records)
- 2013: “Latin collection” (Acoustic records)
- 2014: All Together Now (Acoustic Records)
