= My Shining Hour (album) =

Studio album by Kjersti Stubø
- Released: 2001
- Genre: Jazz
- Length: 41:32
- Label: Blue Jersey
- Producer: Kjersti Stubø

Kjersti Stubø chronology
Oofotr II (2001)	My Shining Hour (2001)	How High is the Sky (2011)

My Shining Hour is a studio album by the Norwegian jazz singer Kjersti Stubø. It was released in 2001 in Oslo by Blue Jersey Records (BJCD 02).

== Background ==
Her debut album as a solo artist, Stubø chose to go her own ways and approach her musical roots in jazz standard material.

== Track listing ==
1. "If I Should Lose You" (Ralph Rainger, Leo Robin) – 3:44
2. "My Shining Hour" (Harold Arlen, Johnny Mercer) – 3:36
3. "My Foolish Heart" (Victor Young, Ned Washington) – 5:22
4. "I'm Old Fashioned" (Jerome Kern, Mercer) – 3:18
5. "It Could Happen to You" (Jimmy Van Heusen, Johnny Burke) – 3:58
6. "Angel Eyes" (Matt Dennis, Earl K. Brent; arr. Vigleik Storaas) – 4:18
7. "Blame It on My Youth" (Oscar Levant, Edward Heyman) – 5:52
8. "It's All Right With Me" (Cole Porter) – 3:50
9. "I Could Never Fool You" (Hans Mathisen) – 2:59
10. "My One and Only Love" (Guy Wood, Robert Mellin) – 3:14

== Personnel ==
Musicians

- Kjersti Stubø – vocals
- Anders Bergcrantz –trumpet, flugelhorn
- Vigleik Storaas – piano
- Olaf Kamfjord – double bass
- Per Oddvar Johansen – drums

Technical

- Kjersti Stubø – producer
- Jan Erik Kongshaug – recording engineer
