= Jørn Øien =

Norwegian jazz pianist (born 1968)

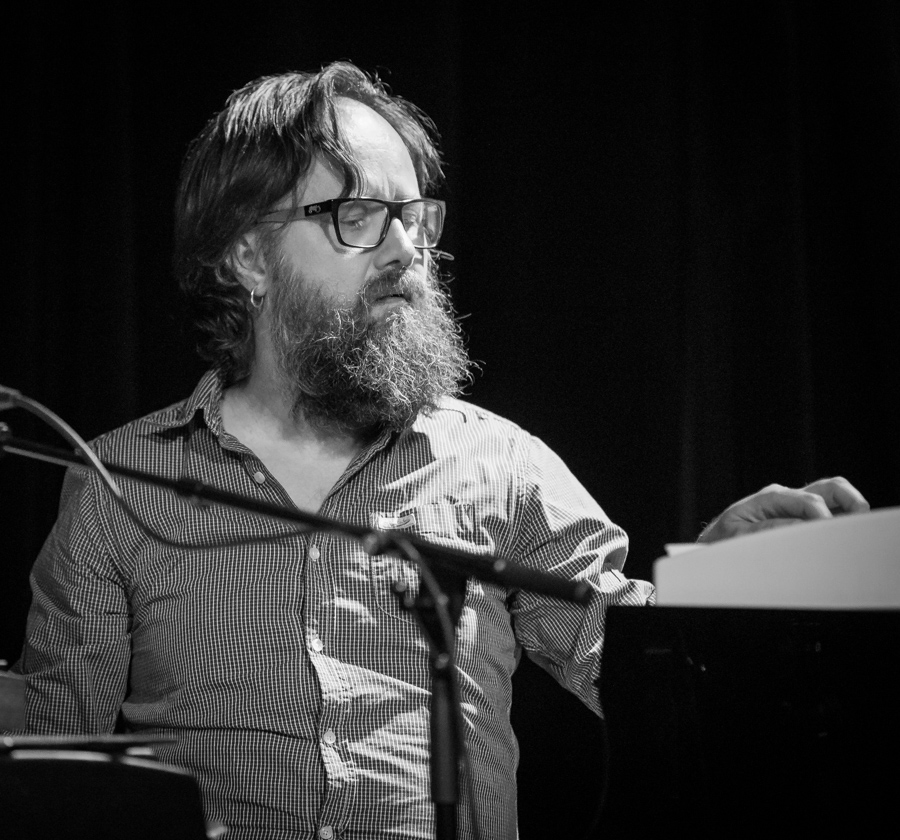
- Øien at the 2017 Oslo Jazzfestival

Background information
- Born: 19 January 1968 (age 58); Narvik, Norway
- Genres: Jazz
- Occupations: Musician, composer
- Instrument: Piano
- Labels: Bolage; Grappa; Curling Legs
- Member of: Oofotr
- Website: www.avantgong.com

Jørn Øien (born 19 January 1968 in Narvik) is a Norwegian jazz pianist and keyboard player. He is known from a number of festival performances and record releases, and cooperations with the likes of Thorgeir Stubø, Kjersti Stubø, Ernst-Wiggo Sandbakk, John Pål Inderberg, Tore Brunborg, Knut Værnes, Kjell Karlsen, Terje Gewelt, Roger Johansen, Paal Nilssen-Love, Per Zanussi and Torstein Lofthus.

== Career ==
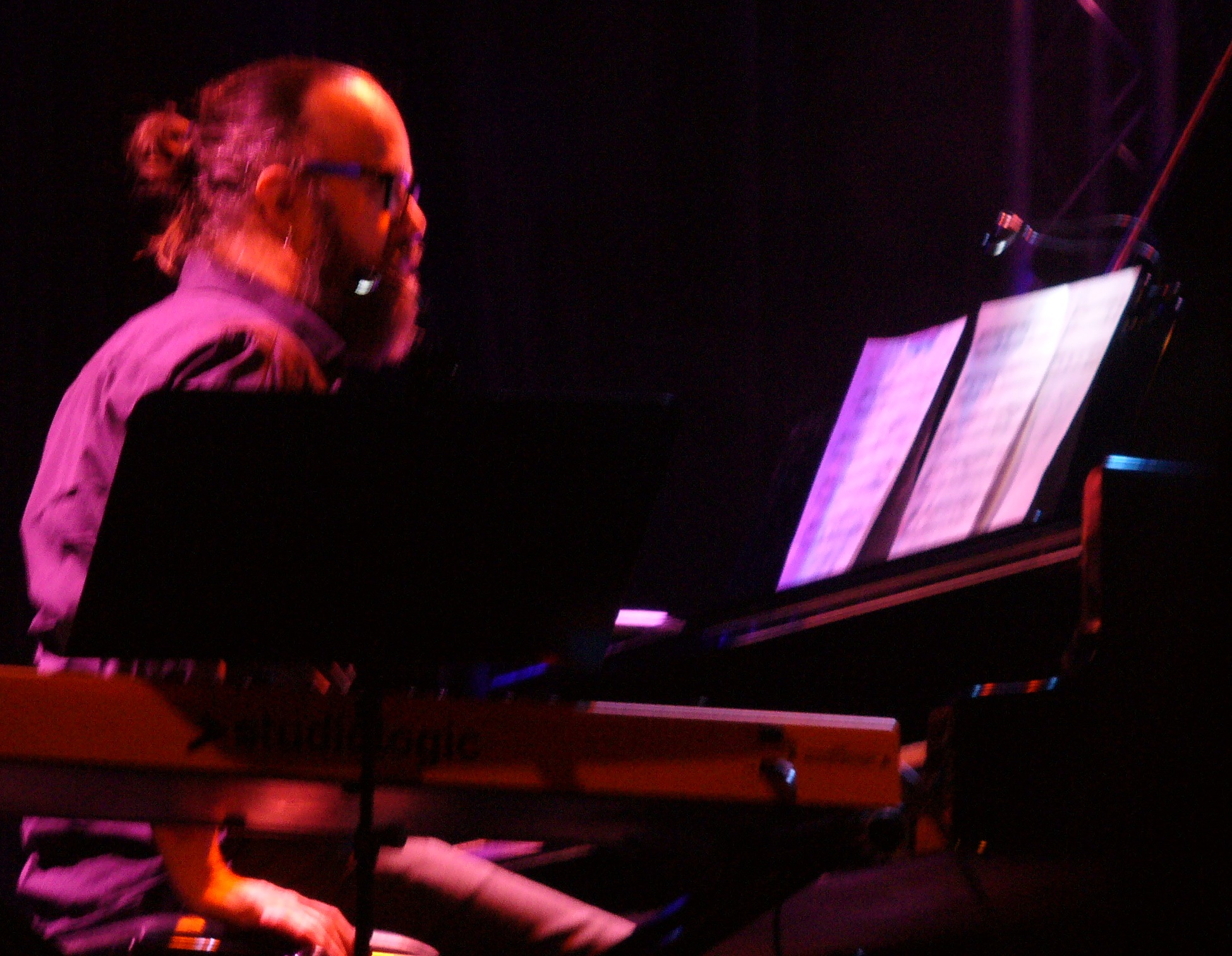
Øien at Vossajazz 2014.

Øien was educated at the "Nord-Norsk Musikkonservatorium" (1987–91), where he studied the music of Edvard Grieg while he played in bands such as "Stett", "Tutu" and "Corny Horns". Øien participated in the NRK series "Ung norsk jazz" with a trio comprising Trond Sverre Hansen (drums) and Konrad Kaspersen (bass). This led to the formation of a jazz band "Jazz i Nord" from Troms, consisting of country musicians, where the trombonist Øystein B. Blix also contributed. This partnership is evidence on the record Song, Fall Soft (1995) with the vocalist Marit Sandvik.

In 1996 he led the jam backing band at Moldejazz Festival, and moved to Oslo, and settled as one of the most used freelance pianists in the last half of the 20th century in the Norwegian capital. Other cooperation was with Knut Værnes, Staffan William-Olsson's records Smile (1998) and Oak road boogaloo (2000), Alf Kjellman Project, Beady Belle and Trionic, Ole Jacob Hansen, Espen Lind's band, Espen Rud Sextett, awarded Spellemannprisen 1998 for the album Rudlende, Tine Asmundsen's "Lonely Woman", and Geir Lysne's "Listening Ensemble". Øien is part of the band Oofotr (with two records) and the Nordland quintet North. In 2003 he led the "Nordnorsk jazzforum" prosjekt Milestones and appeared at Moldejazz together with George Garzone. He also play in Nils-Olav Johansen Band (2006–), and the band Moment with Tore Brunborg, Jens Fossum and Andreas Bye. Moreover, he played a central part in the play "Chet spiller ikke her" at "Torshovteateret" 2009–10.

Øien Short stories (2004) with his own trio Jørn Øien Trio in Oslo, comprising Terje Gewelt (bass) and Roger Johansen (drums). Former members were Paal Nilssen-Love (drums) and Kåre Garnes (bass). The trio now with Per Zanussi (bass) and Torstein Lofthus (drums) released the album Digging in the Dark (2010). In 2011 Erling Wiclund of NRK highlighted him as "one original and brilliant arrangerer in the upper world class".

At Vossajazz 2014, he appeared within Ivar Kolve's Polyostinat experience. He performed with a team of Norwegian musicians, including Kåre Kolve, Ellen Andrea Wang and Jarle Vespestad.

== Works ==
- Commission for the "Festival of Northern Norway" (1998)
- Steam Loco, commission for the "Vinterfestuka" in Narvik (2000)

== Discography ==
As Jørn Øien Trio

- 2004: Short stories (Resonant Music)
- 2010: Digging in the Dark (Bolage Records)

With Oofotr

- 1995: Oofotr (Norske Gram)
- 2001: Oofotr II (Heilo)

With Geir Lysne Listening Ensemble

- 2002: Aurora Borealis – Nordic Lights (Groove Records, NRK), Suite For Jazz Orchestra
- 2003: Korall (ACT Records), feat. Sondre Bratland
- 2006: Boahjenásti – The North Star (ACT Records)
- 2009: The Grieg code (ACT Records)

With Staffan William-Olsson

- 1998: Smile! (Real Records)
- 2000: Oak road boogaloo (Real Records)

With Beady Belle

- 2003: Cewbeagappic
- 2005: Closer
- 2008: Belvedere (Jazzland Records)

With other projects

- 1995: Song, fall soft (Taurus/Gemini Records), with Marit Sandvik
- 1997: The Alf Kjellman Project
- 1997: Rudlende (Gemini Records), with Espen Rud Sextett
- 1998: Sympathetic, with Ernst-Wiggo Sandbakk & "The Sympathy Orchestra»
- 1999: Super Duper (Curling Legs), with Knut Værnes
- 2001: Big Band Bonanza (2001), with Kjell Karlsen
- 2003: aLive (Hazel Jazz, 2003), with Tine Asmundsen's Lonely Woman
- 2008: Paradiso, with Moment
- 2010: Live, with Magni Wentzel at Oslo Jazz Festival 2003
- 2011: How High is the Sky (Bolage), within Kjersti Stubø Band
- 2012: Northern Arc (Curling Legs), with Northern Arc
- 2012: New Surroundings (Schmell), within Kåre Nymark Band
