= Trøen =

Trøen or Troen is a surname. Notable people with the surname include:

- Elisabeth Lid Trøen (born 1992), Norwegian jazz saxophonist and composer
- S. Ilan Troen, Israeli scholar
- Tone Wilhelmsen Trøen (born 1966), Norwegian politician
