= Oofotr =

Norwegian musical group

- Origin: Narvik, Norway
- Genres: Jazz ambient world music
- Years active: 1993–present
- Labels: Norske Gram; Heilo
- Members: Kjersti Stubø; Jørn Øien; Ernst-Wiggo Sandbakk

Oofotr is a Norwegian music group consisting of jazz musicians from Narvik Municipality. They arrange traditional music from Ofoten and had their debut in Kjeldebotn Church, 1994 with music contributions from local historian Magnus Pettersen from Ballangen Municipality. After a series of performances on the north Norwegian music and album, belonged new material from Tromsø Museum and a second album in 2001.

The band combines ambient and world music and is partly inspired by Sandbakk's engagement with the Trondheim choir Chorus, as in 1981–82 recordings of Ballangen music. "Oofotr" comes from Ofoten in Aslak Bolt's land register.

== Band members ==
- Kjersti Stubø - vocal
- Ernst-Wiggo Sandbakk - drums
- Jørn Øien - piano

== Discography ==
- Oofotr (Norske Gram, 1995)
- Oofotr II (Heilo, 2001)
