= How High Is the Sky =

How High is the Sky

Studio album by Kjersti Stubø
- Released: September 17, 2011
- Genre: Jazz
- Length: 49:21
- Label: Bolage
- Producer: Kjersti Stubø

Kjersti Stubø chronology
| My Shining Hour (2001) | How High is the Sky (2011) |

How High is the Sky (released 14 November 2011 in Oslo, Norway, by the Bolage label – BLGCD 018) is a jazz album by the Norwegian jazz group Kjersti Stubø Quartet featuring MiNensemblet.

== Critical reception ==
Professional ratings
Review scores
| Source | Rating |
|---|---|
| Dagbladet | 5/6 stars |

Erling Wicklund spoke highly of the album for NRK: "Stubø picks some of her favorite tunes on his second solo album, and along with her regular quartet and the MiN ensemble, she offers music of the highest quality, sprawling and full of surprises. Jørn Øien has done a wonderful job with the arrangements, ranging all the way from the playful riffs to steel blue textures, associating with Gil Evans, Debussy and Messiaen."

The Norwegian newspaper Dagbladet rated the album 5/6.

== Track listing ==
1. Charade (6:14)
2. If I were a bell (3:48)
3. Some other time (5:54)
4. All of you (3:24)
5. Åh, så intensiv (5:43)
6. You've changed (7:34)
7. If you never come to me (3:41)
8. How deep is the ocean (5:50)
9. Radio Ga Ga (5:01)
10. Mood (2:17)

== Musicians ==
=== Kjersti Stubø Quartet ===
- Kjersti Stubø - vocals
- Jørn Øien - piano
- Håkon Mjåset Johansen - drums
- Jon Rune Strøm - double bass

=== MiNensemblet ===
- Øivind Nussle – violin
- Tor Johan Bøen - violin
- Kate Read – viola
- Hans-Urban Andersson – cello
- Jon Sjøen – contrabass
- Ole Kristoffersen – clarinet
- Inge Rolland – flute
- Anton Biehe - bassoon
