= Baritone Landscape =

Studio album by John Pål Inderberg
- Released: 2001
- Recorded: All other tracks recorded in Sofienberg Kirke, Oslo, 4 December 1998
- Genre: Jazz
- Length: 39:38
- Label: Gemini Records
- Producer: Roger Valstad & Björn Petersen

Baritone Landscape (released 2001 by the label Gemini Records - GMCD 107) is a solo album by John Pål Inderberg.

== Critical reception ==
Professional ratings
Review scores
Source	Rating
Dagbladet	5/6 stars

Barytone saxophone is an unusual solo instrument. Reviewer Tomas Lauvland Pettersen on Listen to Norway, states: "On the aptly titled Baritone Landscape he has gathered a crew of formidable players to explore what could loosely be described as the Tristano School. Joining in on the unorthodox key changes and augmented chords is piano player Vigleik Storaas, bassist Sondre Meisfjord and drummer Ernst Wiggo Sandbakk – all highly respected players with a strong background from Trondheim’s Jazz Conservatory. Inderberg is one of the few baritone players to attempt the challenging multi-noted theme statements and serpentine-like solos, which form such important aspects of Tristano’s work. Most will agree that he has succeeded in his attempt".

The review by Terje Mosnes of the Norwegian newspaper Dagbladet awarded the album dice 5.

== Track listing ==
1. «Brother Can You Spare a Dime» (5:47)
  (Jay Gorney)
2. «It's You» (5:07)
  (Lee Konitz)
3. «Bassalter» (7:04)
  (John Pål Inderberg)
4. «Feather Bed/No Splice» (5:28)
  (Ted Brown/Lee Konitz)
5. «Baritone Landscape» (4:17)
  (John Pål Inderberg)
6. «Dream Stepper» (3:28)
  (Lee Konitz)
7. «Dixies Dilemma/Emma» (8:23)
  (Warne Marsh)

== Personnel ==
- John Pål Inderberg – barytone saxophone
- Vigleik Storaas – piano
- Sondre Meisfjord – double bass
- Ernst-Wiggo Sandbakk - drums

== Credits ==
- Alun Morgan - liner notes
- Björn Petersen - executive producer
- Roger Valstad - engineer & producer
