= Elisabeth Lid Trøen =

Norwegian jazz saxophonist, and composer (born 1992)

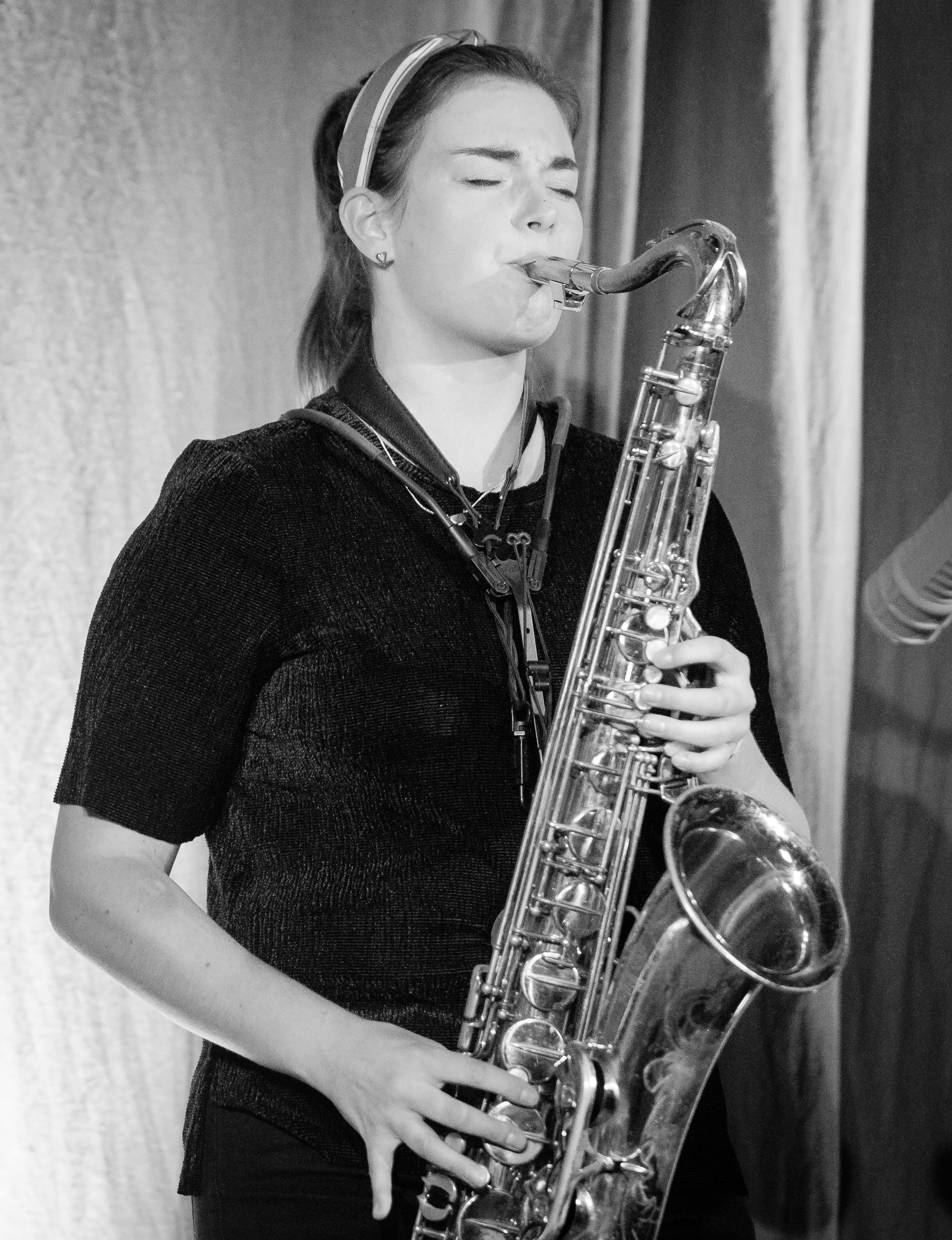
- Trøen at Jazz på Jølst 2018.

Background information
- Born: 15 March 1992 (age 34); Voss Municipality, Hordaland, Norway
- Genres: Jazz
- Occupations: Musician, composer
- Instrument: Saxophone

Elisabeth Lid Trøen (born 15 March 1992 in Voss Municipality, Norway) is a Norwegian jazz saxophonist, and composer.

== Biography ==
Trøen picked up the saxophone at 16 in 2008, and studied jazz at Voss Jazzskule. By the age of 20, she had already played with musicians like Terri Lyne Carrington, Tineke Postma, Andy Sheppard, Tord Gustavsen, and not the least Joshua Redman. In 2013, she played with her own Elisabeth Lid Trøen Quartet, at Vossajazz, including with pianist Erlend Slettevoll, bassist Steinar Raknes, and drummer Erik Nylander. At the 2014 Vossajazz she played with Signe Førre Band. The lineup included pianist Eivind Austad, and drummer Håkon Mjåset Johansen. In 2016 Trøen continued the collaboration with Tord Gustavsen. At the 2018 Vossajazz Trøen appeared with the Bergen Big Band featuring keyboardist and orchestra leader Django Bates.

== Honors ==
- 2011: Awarded the Drømmestipendet (the dream scholarship) by the Norwegian Cultural Education Council

== Discography ==
With Dag Arnesen and Bergen Big Band

- 2017: Norwegian Song IV (Odin)
