= UC 3 (album) =

Studio album by Frode Nymo Steinar Raknes Håkon Mjåset Johansen
- Released: September 27, 2004
- Genre: Jazz
- Length: 46:08
- Label: Bergland Production/Musikkoperatørene

Urban Connection chronology
French Only (2002)	UC 3 (2004)

UC 3 (released 2004 in Oslo, Norway by Bergland Production/Bare Bra Musikk – BE0102) is a Jazz album by the Norwegian Jazz band Urban Connection.

Professional ratings
Review scores
Source	Rating
Adresseavisen	5/6 stars
Bergens Tidende	4/6 stars
Smaalenenes Avis	4/6 stars

== Review ==
Urban Connection comprises the jazz musicians Frode Nymo (saxophone), Steinar Raknes (bass) and Håkon Mjåset Johansen (drums).

The Norwegian Jazz magazine «Ballade» (Listen to Norway) critique Tomas Lauvland Pettersen, in his review of the Urban Connection album UC 3 states:

... Their take on modern Konitzesque jazz is highly integral and utterly convincing on their third full-length outing ‘UC 3’. Bassist Raknes is not only able to swing and solo, he writes strong tunes with challenging harmonic and rhythmic twists that keep the listener on his toes throughout the recording...

The magazine Down Beat in a review of the Urban Connection concert at Vossajazz 2012, states:

... Another fresh-sounding Norwegian act on the bill was the increasingly popular Urban Connection, an acoustic chordless trio with bass, sax and drums, finding its way between lyricism, tighten-up funk and post-bopping gymnastics. They assert a cool, nimble collective vibe. ...

== Reception ==
The review by the Norwegian newspaper Adresseavisen awarded the album 5 stars (dice), the review by the Norwegian newspaper Bergens Tidende awarded the album 4 stars (dice), and the review by the Norwegian newspaper Smaalenenes Avis awarded the album 4 stars (dice).

== Track listing ==
1. «Nexus» (5:07)
2. «Oh Yeah!» (6:03)
3. «I Need an Exit» (5:31)
4. «Brannigans Law» (4:53)
5. «Show!» (7:15)
6. «The Black Meat» (4:36)
7. «Flower» (7:12)
8. «Interzone» (5:31)

== Credits ==
- Alto Saxophone - Frode Nymo
- Bass – Steinar Raknes
- Drums – Håkon Mjåset Johansen
