= Frode Nymo =

Norwegian jazz saxophonist

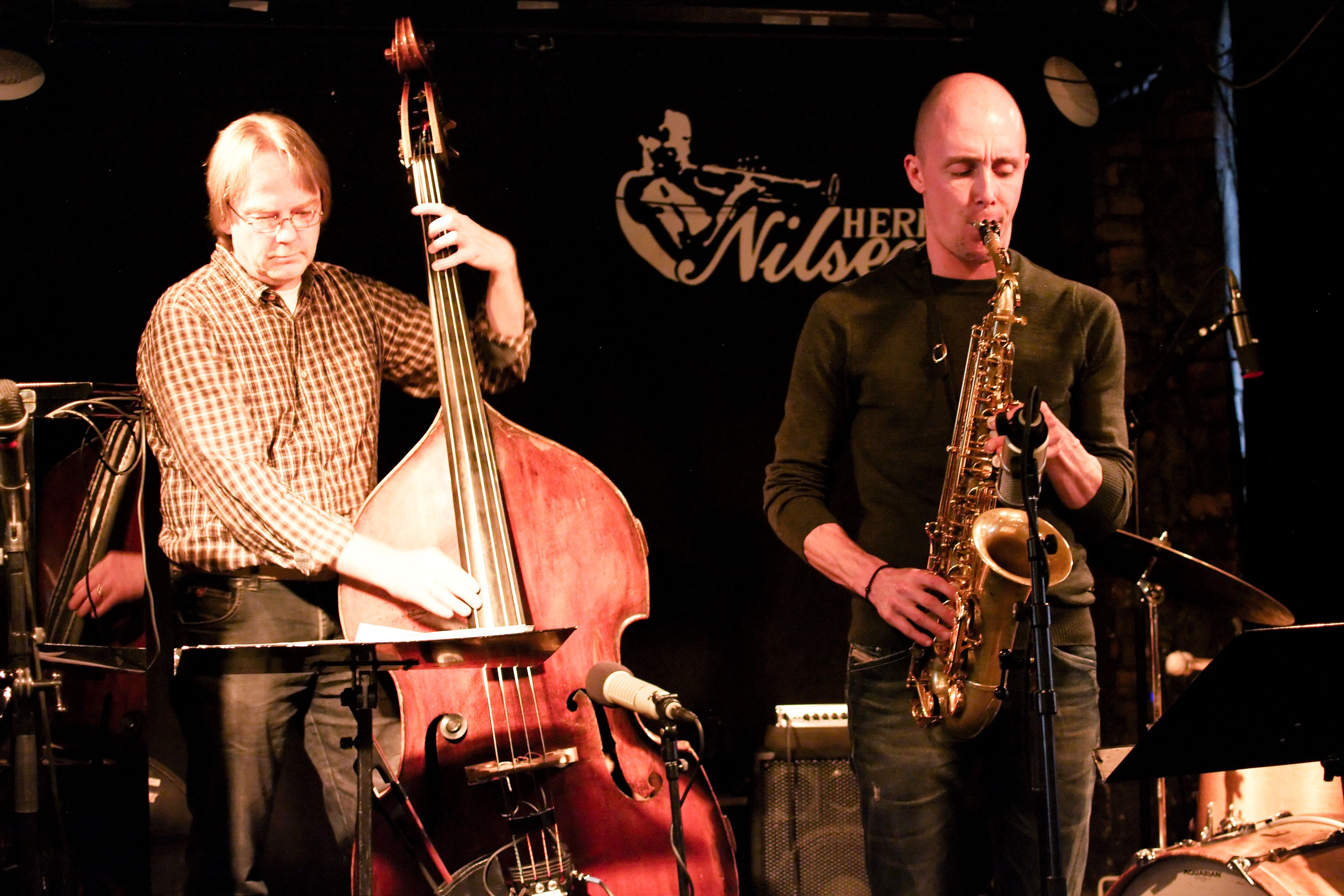
- Terje Gewelt and Frode Nymo live at Herr Nilsen in Oslo February 25, 2012. (Photo: Bjørn Erik Pedersen)

Background information
- Born: 27 November 1975 (age 50); Egersund, Rogaland
- Origin: Norway
- Genres: Jazz
- Occupations: Musician, composer
- Instrument: Saxophone

Frode Nymo (born 27 November 1975), is a Norwegian jazz musician (alto Saxophone), and older brother of the tenor sax. player Atle Nymo.

== Career ==
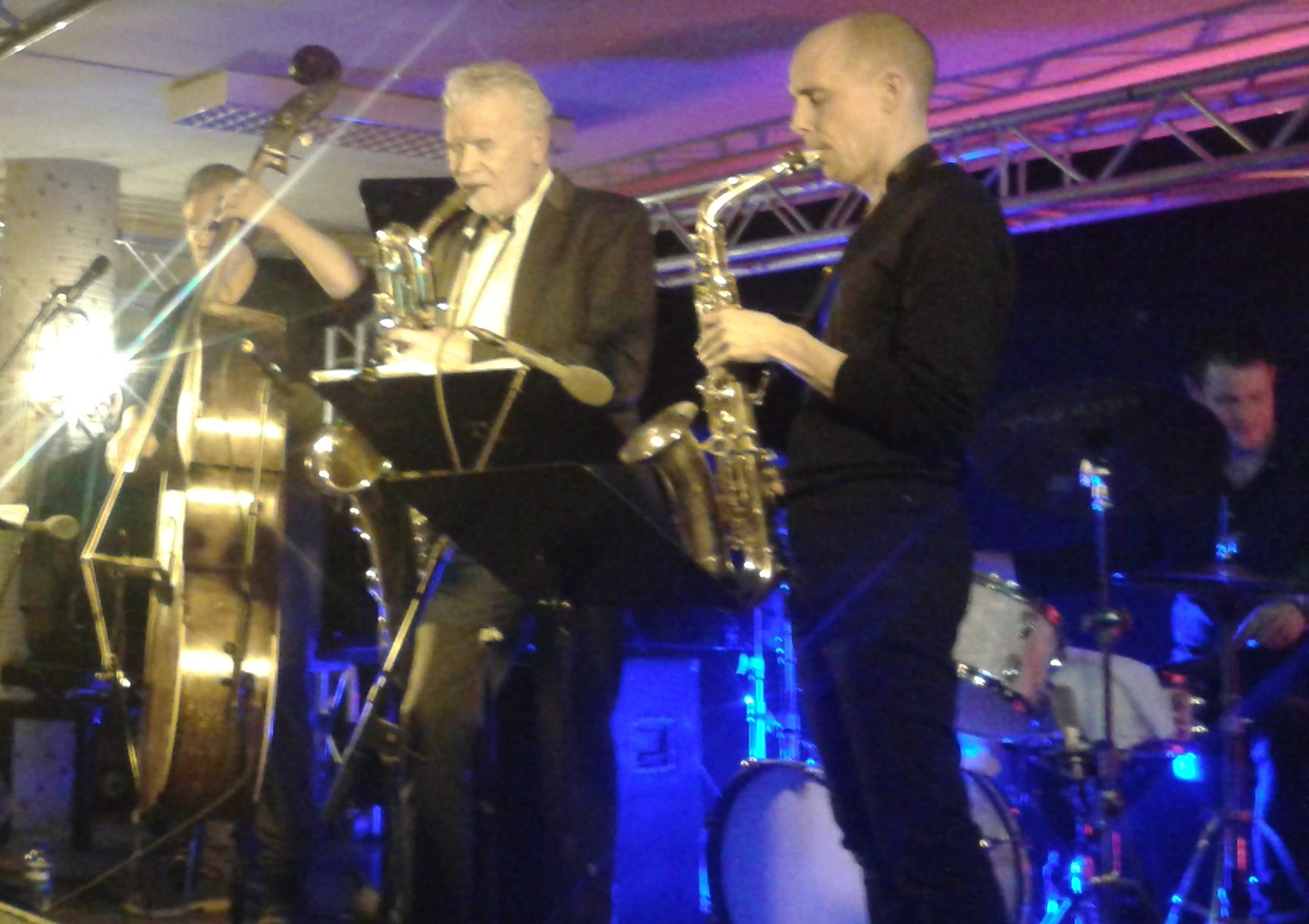
Nymo and John Pål Inderberg with Bjørn Alterhaug Quintet at Vossajazz 2016.

Nymo was born in Egersund and brought up in Valnesfjord, near Fauske. Early in his career, he was a member of the Bodø Big Band led by Henning Gravrok, and he is a graduate of the Jazz Program at Trondheim Musikkonservatorium, where he and fellow students established Urban Connection, awarded the title of "Young Jazz Musicians of the Year" in 1998, at Norway's prestigious Molde International Jazz Festival, forerunner of today's Jazz Intro Award, and Spellemannprisen 2001. The result have been three album releases, and touring under the auspices of the Moldejazz, where they visited several of the major festivals in Europe, like the Montreaux Jazz Festival, the North Sea Jazz Festival in Rotterdam, and the Istanbul Jazz Festival amongst others, as well as being Norway's contribution EBU Festival in the Czech and Norwegian jazz forums envoys to the jazz festival in the Faroe Islands. With his brother, he released the album Inner Urge (2004), and was honored "This year's attention" in Valnesfjord 1997.

== Honors ==
- "This year's attention" in Valnesfjord 1997
- "Young Jazz Musicians of the Year" 1998 at Moldejazz
- Spellemannprisen 2001 in the class Jazz, for the album Urban Connection (2001), within Urban Connection

== Discography (in selection) ==
=== Within Urban Connection ===
- 2001: Urban Connection (Bergland Productions)
- 2002: French Only (Bergland Productions)
- 2004: UC 3 (Bergland Productions)

=== Within "Atle Nymo and Frode Nymo Quartet" ===
- 2004: Inner Urge (Taurus Records), feat. Roger Kellaway, with additional Håkon Mjåset Johansen (drums) and Ole Morten Vågan (bass)

=== Within Børre Dalhaug's "Bigbandblast" ===
- 2004: Bigbandblast! (Real Records)

With Erik Wesseltoft

- 2013: To Someone I Knew (Normann Records)
