= Ernst-Wiggo Sandbakk =

Norwegian jazz drummer (born 1957)

- Born: 28 September 1957 (age 69); Kjeldebotn, Ballangen Municipality
- Origin: Norway
- Genre: Jazz
- Occupations: Musician, composer
- Instrument: Drums
- Labels: Taurus; Grappa Music; Gemini
- Member of: Oofotr
- Website: www.ntnu.edu/employees/ernst.wiggo.sandbakk

Ernst-Wiggo Sandbakk (born 28 September 1957) is a Norwegian jazz musician (drums) and music teacher. Known from a series of concerts, festival performances and records with the likes of DumDum Boys, Thorgeir Stubø, Frode Alnæs, Palle Mikkelborg, Terje Bjørklund, Vigleik Storaas, Bjørn Alterhaug, Nils Petter Molvær, Knut Riisnæs, John Pål Inderberg, Sondre Meisfjord, Jan Gunnar Hoff, Kjersti Stubø and Henning Sommerro.

== Career ==
Sandbakk was born in Kjeldebotn in Ballangen Municipality. He appeared on Thorgeir Stubø's first album Notice, later establishing himself in Trondheim, where he teaches on the Jazz programme at the Trondheim Musikkonservatorium, where he holds an instrumental teaching degree from 1982. In addition he is associate professor at the Musikkonservatoriet i Tromsø, and has also written several textbooks on drumming like Hvordan spille moderne trommesett, to mention one.

Sandbakk appeared on the album Blodig Alvor (1988), with the renowned Norwegian rock band DumDum Boys, playing drums on the song "Idyll". In 1993 he initiated the band Oofotr in Narvik Municipality, together with jazz singer Kjersti Stubø, daughter of the legendary jazz guitarist Thorgeir Stubø, and the pianist Jørn Øien.

Sandbakk has worked as Program Director at NTNU Department of Music, Performing music, in addition to teach the drum set and aural training. He is managing director of Trondheim Jazz Festival, has been freelance musician since 1977, and has played with such orchestras as "Trondheim Sympatiorkester", "Trondheim Bop-Service", "Konerne Ved Vandposten", "Arvid Martinsen Band", "Bjørn Willadsen Band", "Gunnar A. Berg & The Music Machine", "E.W.S. & The Sympathy Orchestra" (including keyboardist Arve Furset and pianist Jørn Øien). He also plays on a regular basis with his own prosjects Oofotr and Afrocadabra".

== Discography ==
=== Solo works ===
- 1998: Sympathetic, "E.W.S. & The Sympathy Orchestra»

=== Collaborative works ===
Within Oofotr

- Oofotr (Norske Gram, 1995)
- Oofotr II (Heilo, 2001)

With John Pål Inderberg

- 2000: Baritone Landscape (Gemini Records), within "The Zetting»
- 2004: Sval Draum (Taurus Records)

With other projects

- 1981: Notice (Odin Records), with Thorgeir Stubø
- 1982: It's Just A Game (Experience Records), with "Arvid Martinsen Band»
- 1988: Blodig Alvor Na Na Na Na Na (CBS Records), with DumDum Boys "Idyll"
- 2012: Eg Vandrar Langs Kaiane (Øra Fonogram), with Annjo K. Greenall
- 2014: Exit Sigurd Bjørhovde Groups, recorded 1981
- 2013: Live No Evil Sigurd Bjørhovde Quintet, recorded 1980
