= Oofotr II =

2001 studio album by Oofotr

Studio album by Ernst-Wiggo Sandbakk Jørn Øien Kjersti Stubø Arve Furset, Gunnar Andreas Berg Ivar Gafseth
- Released: 2001
- Recorded: Volt Studio, Oslo; Skansen Lydstudio, Trondheim
- Genre: World Ambient
- Length: 48:17
- Label: Heilo catalog on Grappa Music
- Producer: Ernst-Wiggo Sandbakk

Oofotr chronology
Oofotr (1985)	Oofotr II (2001)

Oofotr II (released 2001 in Norway by Grappa Music, Heilo catalog – HCD 7169) is a Norwegian studio album by the band Oofotr performing traditional music from Ofoten, like World Ambient, in a Nordic Traditional style.

Professional ratings
Review scores
Source	Rating
Dagbladet	4/6 stars

== Review ==
Oofotr II is the second album from this acclaimed Norwegian jazz trio. The project of presenting electronic versions of traditional music from Ofoten in Nordland, is resilient and deserve attention. Keyboardist Jørn Øien and Arve Furset, drummer Ernst Wiggo Sandbakk and vocalist Kjersti Stubø creates intense soundscapes, heavily melody-based, but with a wide enough range of rhythms, harmonies, beats and timbres that they are far more interesting music to listen to, than a lot of other computer based music. The term ambient world is printed on the cover, and it may so be, but the album consists of a series of fine tunes anyway.

== Reception ==
The review by the Norwegian newspaper Dagbladet awarded the album dice 4.

== Personnel ==
Standard lineup

- Ernst-Wiggo Sandbakk – drums and percussions
- Jørn Øien – keyboards
- Kjersti Stubø – vocals

Additional musicians

- Arve Furset – keyboard
- Gunnar Andreas Berg – guitar
- Ivar Gafseth – vocals

== Track listing ==
1. «Meeting of the Hidden» (5:35), vocals by Ivar Gafseth
2. «The Soul» (4:56)
3. «New World» (3:34)
4. «The Message» (6:42)
5. «Walking in the Desert» (4:01)
6. «O Lam jeg Ser» (3:13)
7. «Poorboy» (4:41)
8. «Where You Go» (6:51)
9. «Land Of Babel» (5:15), feat. Gunnar Andreas Berg (mixed by Rune Holme)
10. «The Face» (6:42)

== Credits ==
- Featuring Arve Furset
- All titles based on trad folk songs from Ofoten, Norway
- Recorded and mixed in Volt Studio, Oslo
- Engineer Arve Furset
- Mastered in Skansen Lydstudio, Trondheim, by Stein Brattland
- Tracks 1, 2, 4, 6, 7, 8 produced by Arve Furset and Ernst Wiggo Sandbakk
- Tracks 3, 5, 9 produced by Arve Furset and Jørn Øien
- Executive producer: Ernst Wiggo Sandbakk
