= Song for Josia =

2014 studio album by Hanna Paulsberg

Song For Josia

Studio album by Hanna Paulsberg, Trygve Waldemar Fiske, Oscar Grönberg, and Hans Hulbækmo
- Released: 2014
- Recorded: Øra Studio, October 7–9, 2013
- Genre: Jazz
- Length: 40:36
- Label: Øra Fonogram
- Producer: Hanna Paulsberg

Hanna Paulsberg chronology
Waltz For Lilli (2012)	Song For Josia (2014)	TBC

Song For Josia (released 2014 in Oslo, Norway by Øra Fonogram – OF034) is the second solo album by the saxophonist Hanna Paulsberg, as "Hanna Paulsberg Concept".

Professional ratings
Review scores
Source	Rating
Dagbladet	5/6 stars

== Reception ==
The review by Fredrik Wandrup of the Norwegian newspaper Dagbladet awarded the album dice 5. Kongsberg Jazzfestival reviewer Tor Dalaker Lund awarded the album Record of the month, March.

== Review ==
Shorter and Miles acoustic bands influenced the saxophonist. All the compositions are made by Paulsberg, and the music is always in motion, carefully lifted by the rhythm strong section.

Song For Josia is Paulsberg's second album, following her solo debut Waltz For Lilli (2012).

TheJazzBreakfast.com critique Peter Bacon, in his review of Paulsberg's album Song For Josia states:

... Right from the opening notes this is an album which draws the listener in – it's the way the band interacts, it's the sound of their instruments, especially Paulsberg's saxophone. Not only does she have a compelling sound, rounded with both a puffy tone and a clear edge as well, but she constructs great lines with strong sense of searching and forward momentum...

== Track listing ==
All compositions by Hanna Paulsberg

No.	Title	Length
1.	"Frygia"	7:09
2.	"De Ensomme (The Lonely Ones)"	5:54
3.	"Diamond(ra)"	6:33
4.	"Song For Josia"	6:43
5.	"Elephant Mist"	6:43
6.	"A Coat Of Many Colors"	2:19
7.	"Hemulen"	5:57

- Recorded in Øra Studio 7th - 9th 2013

== Personnel ==
- Hanna Paulsberg - saxophone
- Trygve Waldemar Fiske - acoustic bass
- Oscar Grönberg - piano
- Hans Hulbækmo - drums
- Jo Ranheim - Mastered

== Notes ==
- Cover art & design – Heida Karine Johannesdottir Mobeck
- Innside photo - Andreas Hansson
- Mastering – Jo Ranheim in Redroom studios
- Mixing – Jo Ranheim, Jostein Ansnes
