= Heidi Skjerve =

Norwegian jazz musician and composer (born 1979)

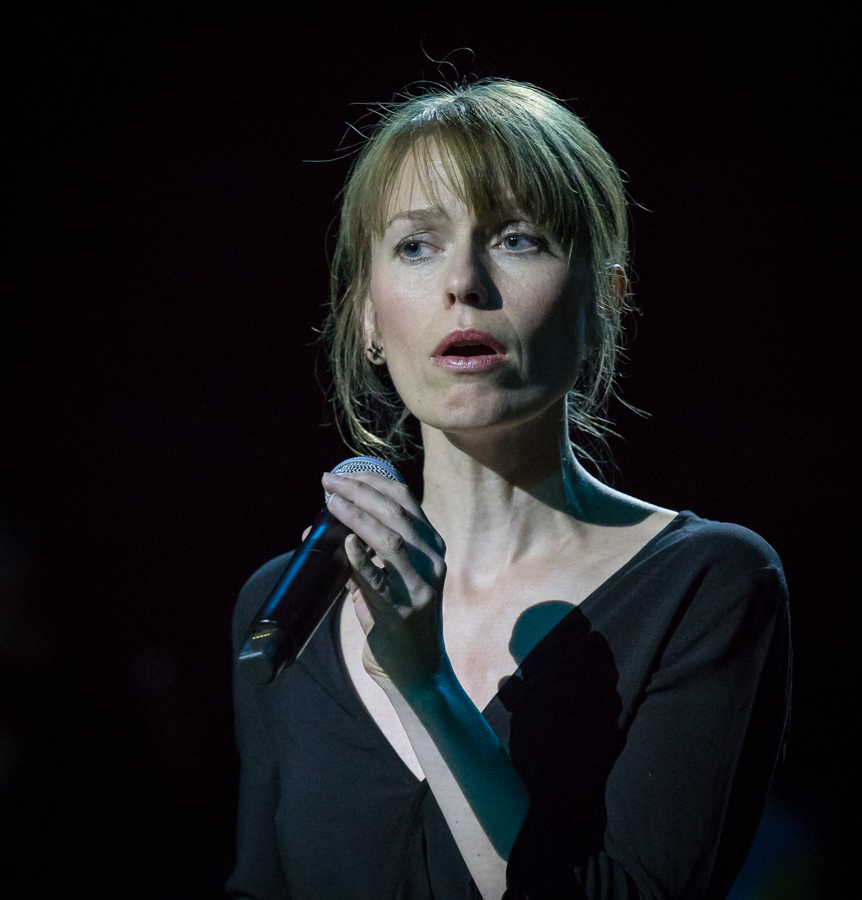
- In 2017

Background information
- Born: 24 July 1979 (age 47); Rennebu Municipality, Sør-Trøndelag
- Origin: Norway
- Genres: Jazz
- Occupations: Musician and composer
- Instrument: Vocals
- Website: Official website

Heidi Skjerve (born 24 July 1979 in Rennebu Municipality, Norway) is a Norwegian jazz musician (singer) and composer.

== Career ==
Skjerve is a jazz singer with a background of Jazz and music technology studies on the Jazz program at Trondheim Musikkonservatorium (1998–2002), including studies at Kungliga Musikhögskolan in Stockholm.

She collaborated within the Trondheim Voices for several years, as well as appearing as soloist with the Trondheim Jazz Orchestra, participated within the Swedish improvisation ensemble "Northern Alliance" (2001), participated in The Sources of Christmas (2002) and on Spill (2002) with traditional folk musicians "Flukt", and contributed to the Barramundi/Lina Langendorf Quartet, and Ståle Storløkken's "S. Møller" Blokk 80 (2002).

She has led her own quartet including Kjetil Eide (piano), Ole Morten Vågan (bass) Truls Rønning (drums), performing at the Vossajazz (2002). With her own quintet, she has released two albums, comprising Espen Reinertsen (saxophone), Erlend Slettevoll (piano), Roger Arntzen (bass), and Truls Rønning (drums). In recent years she has developed her artistic expression in improvisation at the intersection of jazz and folk music. Her project to smelt folk Trøndelag with jazz and an exciting musical expression, while helping to promote and preserve the peculiar folk song treasure.

== Honors ==
Geir Digerne's memorial award 2008

== Discography ==
- 2006: Coming Home (Curling Legs), with her own compositions performed by her own quintet
- 2008: Morning News of the Woods (Curling Legs), with her own quintet, with contributions from Thom Hell and Nidaros Strykekvartett.
- 2012: Vegen Åt Deg (Øra Fonogram), with her own quartet, including John Pål Inderberg, Vigleik Storaas and Trygve Waldemar Fiske
