= French Only =

Studio album by Frode Nymo Steinar Raknes Håkon Mjåset Johansen
- Released: 2002
- Recorded: Studio La Buissonne i Avignon, France, Jule - August 2001
- Genre: Jazz
- Length: 42:30
- Label: Bergland Production/Musikkoperatørene

Urban Connection chronology
Urban Connection (2001)	French Only (2002)	UC 3 (2004)

French Only (released 2002 in Oslo, Norway by Bergland Production/Bare Bra Musikk – BE0062) is a Jazz album by the Norwegian Jazz band Urban Connection, also this time with Steinar Raknes compositions for the most.

Professional ratings
Review scores
Source	Rating
Dagbladet	5/6 stars

== Review ==
French Only is the second album from this acclaimed Norwegian jazz trio. Their music is both hot and swingin', it is open and free, and it is melodic and lyrical. In fact it has so many facets to it as well imaginable for such an ensemble, and much of the credit must go to Steinar Raknes that once again have composed almost all the music, and thus has created a starting point full of challenges both for himself and his two musical companions.

== Reception ==
The review by the Norwegian newspaper Dagbladet awarded the album 5 stars (dice).

== Track listing ==
1. «Trick Book» (4:57)
2. «Tales Of Dr. Faustus» (6:48)
3. «Cricket Song, Part I» (3:26)
4. «Cricket Song, Part II» (3:16)
5. «Con Chord» (4:48)
6. «Hepburn Dance» (5:53)
7. «Greetings To Idris» (5:02)
8. «Manic Depression» (4:04)
9. «Snowdream» (4:12)

== Credits ==
- Alto Saxophone - Frode Nymo
- Bass – Steinar Raknes
- Drums – Håkon Mjåset Johansen
