= Waltz for Lilli =

2012 studio album by Hanna Paulsberg

Waltz For Lilli

Studio album by Hanna Paulsberg Trygve Waldemar Fiske Oscar Grönberg Hans Hulbækmo
- Released: 2012
- Recorded: Øra Studio 12–14 January 2012
- Genre: Jazz
- Length: 42:25
- Label: Øra Fonogram
- Producer: Hanna Paulsberg

Hanna Paulsberg chronology
Waltz For Lilli (2012)	Song For Josia (2014)

Waltz For Lilli (released 2014 in Oslo, Norway by Øra Fonogram – OF034) is the debut solo album by the saxophonist Hanna Paulsberg, as "Hanna Paulsberg Concept".

Professional ratings
Review scores
Source	Rating
Dagbladet	5/6 stars
The Jazz Mann	4/5 stars

== Reception ==
The review by Fredrik Wandrup of the Norwegian newspaper Dagbladet awarded the album 5 stars (dice), and the reviewer Ian Mann of the Jazz Mann awarded the album 4 stars

== Review ==
The harmonies between the energetic piano by the Swede Oscar Grönberg, and the secure saxophone of Paulsberg, characterize the album. All the compositions are made by Paulsberg, and the music is incessantly in motion, driving dynamics, but carefully lifted by the rhythm section, Hans Hulbækmo (drums) and Trygve Waldemar Fishing (bass).

All About Jazz critique John Kelman, in his review of Paulsberg's album Waltz For Lilli states:

... Despite Paulsen finding herself in a multiplicity of contexts, her allegiance to the jazz tradition is abundantly clear with Hanna Paulsberg Concept (HPC),
also featuring three other recognition-worthy young Scandinavians. Waltz for Lilli is many things, but one of them is that it swings—and when it swings, it swings hard...

== Track listing ==
All compositions by Hanna Paulsberg

No.	Title	Length
1.	"Waltz For Lilli"	8:02
2.	"Potters Lullaby"	6:28
3.	"Sang Til Pastor Wang"	6:21
4.	"Noahs Tune"	6:31
5.	"A Trip To The Brown Castle"	7:21
6.	"Mufasa"	5:42

- Recorded in Øra Studio 12–14 January 2012

== Personnel ==
- Hanna Paulsberg - saxophone
- Trygve Waldemar Fiske - double bass
- Oscar Grönberg - piano
- Hans Hulbækmo - drums

== Credits ==
- Cover design – Heida Karine Johannesdottir Mobeck & Leiv Aspèn
- Mastering – Jo Ranheim
- Mixing – Jostein Ansnes
- Photography (cover) – Johannes Selvaag
- Photography (inside) – Andreas Hansson

== Notes ==
- Mastered by Jo Ranheim in Redroom studios
- Recorded in Øra Studio 12–14 January 2012
- Rights Society: n©b
