= Urban Connection =

Norwegian jazz trio

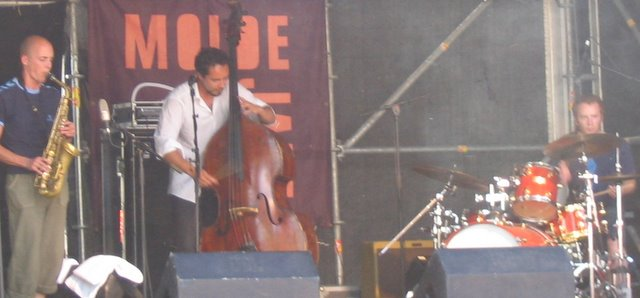
- Urban Connection at Moldejazz 2003. From left: Nymo, Raknes and Johansen.

Background information
- Origin: Trondheim, Norway
- Genres: Jazz
- Years active: 1996–present
- Labels: Bergland Productions
- Members: Steinar Raknes; Håkon Mjåset Johansen; Frode Nymo
- Website: www.urbanconnection.no

Urban Connection is a Norwegian jazz trio who have released three albums. For their first album in 2001, they received a Spellemannprisen.

In 1998, they were awarded the title of "Young Jazz Musicians of the Year" at Norway’s Molde International Jazz Festival (Moldejazz).

As part of Moldejazz, Urban Connection have visited several major European festivals, including the Montreux Jazz Festival, the North Sea Jazz Festival, and the Istanbul Jazz Festival.

They released their first album, Urban Connection, on 15 April 2001, and were awarded the Spellemannprisen as best Jazz record of the year. For their next album. French Only (23 March 2002), they had a release concert at the Ole Bull Academy in Vossavangen during the Vossajazz Festival.

Their third album, UC 3, was released on 13 December 2005; on their tour, they visited England, Canada, Japan, China, Nepal, South Africa and the Baltic countries. Of U3, Tomas Lauvland Pettersen of the Norwegian jazz magazine Ballade wrote, "Their take on modern Konitzesque jazz is highly integral and utterly convincing".

When they reformed in 2012 for a reunion concert, they received positive acclaim.

== Members ==
- Steinar Raknes (Double bass)
- Håkon Mjåset Johansen (Drums)
- Frode Nymo (Saxophone)

== Honors ==
- 1998 – Young Jazz Musicians of the Year, Moldejazz
- 2001 – Jazz Spellemannprisen for Urban Connection

== Discography ==
- 2001: Urban Connection (Bergland Productions)
- 2002: French Only (Bergland Productions)
- 2004: UC 3 (Bergland Productions)

== See also ==
- Music of Norway

== Notes and references ==
Awards
Preceded by Petter Wettre & Per Oddvar Johansen	Recipient of the Jazz Spellemannprisen; 2001	Succeeded by Come Shine
