= Vegen Åt Deg =

Studio album by Heidi Skjerve
- Released: November 28, 2012
- Genre: Jazz
- Length: 43:26
- Label: Øra Fonogram
- Producer: Roger Valstad & Björn Petersen

Heidi Skjerve chronology
Morning News Of The Woods (2008)	Vegen Åt Deg (2012)

Vegen Åt Deg (released 28 November 2012 by the label Øra Fonogram – OF036) is a solo album by Heidi Skjerve.

== Reception ==
Professional ratings
Review scores
Source	Rating
Nettavisen	5/6 stars

Here we are served Skjerve's delicate voice on an album where different genres like traditional folk music, Old Norwegian Folk Dance, Danish hymns and American cool jazz mixes and ascend into a higher unity. She challenges both herself and her teachers from the Jazz program at Trondheim Musikkonservatorium, when she gathers her musical roots, creating a highly personal expression anno 2012. Indeed, Skjerve stake out a new course and opportunities for peculiarly Norwegian improvised music.

The review by Tor Hammerø of the Norwegian electronic newspaper Nettavisen awarded the album dice 5.

== Track listing ==
1. «Nestekjærleik» (3:27)
2. «Vegen Åt Deg» (4:43)
3. «Lær Meg Å Kjenne Dine Veie» (6:57)
4. «Nysnøen» (2:53)
5. «Nu Rinner Solen Op Av Østerlide» (4:04)
6. «Pols Etter Hilmar Alexandersen» (1:35)
7. «Konstnaren/Den Forunderlige Dansen» (4:50)
8. «Stå Fast Min Sjel» (4:06)
9. «Kom Te Mæ» (3:57)
10. «Gløymsla/Bukkhornslåt» (2:54)
11. «Hem» (4:09)

== Personnel ==
- Heidi Skjerve – vocals
- John Pål Inderberg – barytone saxophone
- Vigleik Storaas – piano
- Trygve Waldemar Fiske – double bass

== Credits ==
- Recorded and mixed at Øra Studio, October 2012
- Mastered at Redroom Studio
