= Oscar Grönberg =

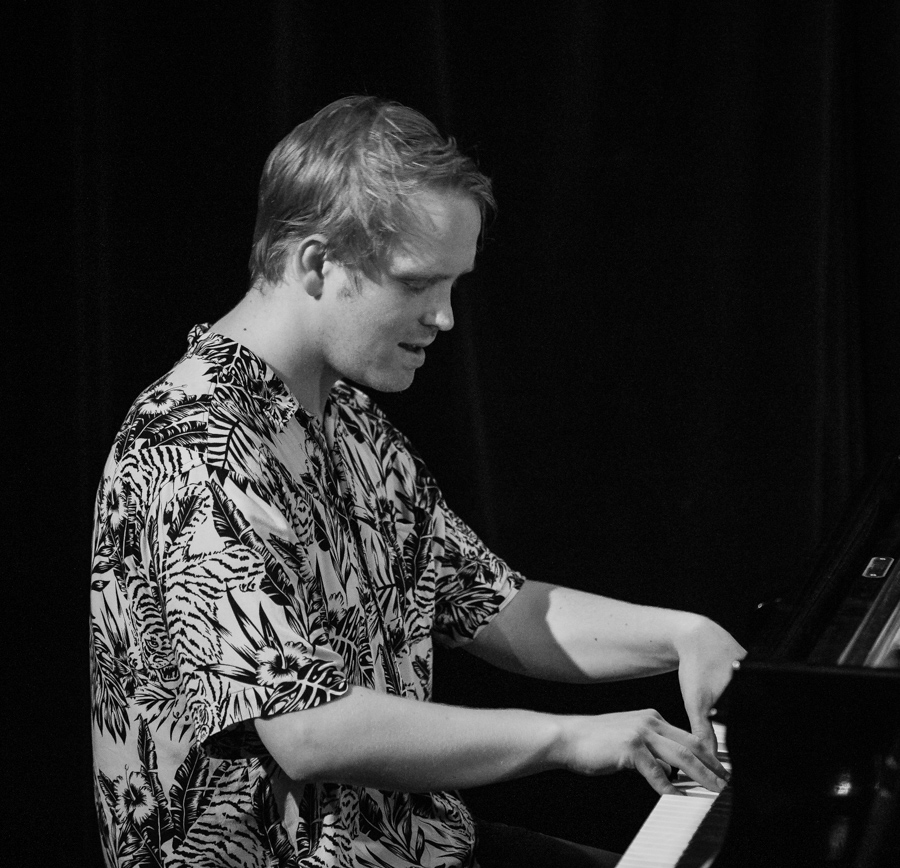
- Oscar Grönberg performing in Oslo in 2019

Background information
- Born: 1987 (age 38–39)
- Origin: Sweden
- Genres: Jazz
- Occupations: Musician, composer
- Instruments: Piano, keyboards
- Label: Øra Fonogram

Oscar Grönberg (born 19 April 1987c), is a Swedish/Norwegian jazz musician (piano) based in Trondheim, Norway, known as bandleader of his own O. G. Trio/O. G. Quartet and for his contributions in bands like Hanna Paulsberg Concept.

== Career ==
Grönberg was born in Sweden and graduated from the Jazz program at Trondheim Musikkonsevatorium in 2011, where he joined the Hanna Paulsberg Concept.

O. G. Trio, including Trygve Waldemar Fiske (double bass) and Tomas Järmyr (drums), is a new, young, creative, exciting and fearless trio that played its debut concert in 2009. Together they create a world of groove, improvisation, humor and playful interaction, all based on Grönberg's subtle and original compositions. The trio is at the same time deeply respectful of the compositions, but also irreverent and free in their interactions over the well-established and endangered species line. The music is inspired by the likes of Thelonious Monk, Ahmad Jamal and Andrew Hill.

== Discography ==
Within Friends & Neighbors

- 2011: No Beat Policy (Øra Fonogram)

Within Hanna Paulsberg Concept

- 2012: Waltz For Lilli (Øra Fonogram)
- 2014: Song For Josia (Øra Fonogram), including Trygve Waldemar Fiske & Hans Hulbækmo

With Doffs Poi

- 2012: Doffs Poi
- 2017: Dictionary Songs (Vilje - Record Label)

With The Maxx

- 2015: Master Blaster (Mindblast Records)
