= Kjersti Stubø =

Norwegian jazz vocalist (born 1970)

- Born: Kjersti Aasan Stubø; 25 April 1970 (age 56); Narvik, Northern Norway
- Origin: Norway
- Genres: Jazz
- Occupations: Musician, composer
- Instrument: Vocals
- Labels: Blue Jersey, Bolage; Grappa Music
- Website: jazzklubben.narviknett.no/miljoet/kjersti.html

Kjersti Aasan Stubø (born 25 April 1970) is a Norwegian jazz musician vocalist, daughter and musical successor of Jazz guitarist Thorgeir Stubø (1943–1986), mother of elektronica musician Mathias Stubø (b. 1992), and sister of Jazz guitarist Håvard and theatre director Eirik Stubø.

== Career ==
Stubø was born in Narvik, and studied jazz on the jazz program at the Trondheim Music Conservatory (1991–93). Aged 14 she performed with her father, Thorgeir, who died from cancer two years later. During her studies in Trondheim she established her own jazz orchestra Kjersti Stubø Band in 1991. Co-musicians on this project were Vigleik Storaas (piano), Tore Brunborg (saxophones), Odd Magne Gridseth (bass) and Ernst-Wiggo Sandbakk (drums). With a different lineup Vigleik Storaas (piano), Olaf Kamfjord (bass) and Per Oddvar Johansen (drums), she released an album in 2001. In 2010 there was a third lineup with Jørn Øien (piano), Magne Thormodsæter (bass) and Håkon Mjåset Johansen (drums). They performed at several festivals and released the record How High is the Sky in 2011. Stubø also joined the vocal band Kvitretten on their releases in 1991–97, and Ernst-Wiggo Sandbakk in his project Oofotr.

She has appeared on many national jazz festivals, in 1999 with Herbie Hancock on the Kongsberg Jazz Festival, but also the Scandinavian scenes, in Umeå International Jazz Festival and Haparanda/Torneå Jazz Festival. In 2009 she started a cooperation with MiNensemblet, and has performed with international artists like Doug Raney and Bernt Rosengren. In addition she has participated on numerous albums and/or performed live with Terri Lyne Carrington, Ira Coleman, Doug Raney, Jesper Lundgaard, Palle Mikkelborg, Svein Olav Herstad, Håkon Mjåset Johansen, Daniel Franck, Ernst-Wiggo Sandbakk, Jørn Øien, Håvard Stubø, Thorgeir Stubø, Vigleik Storaas, Per Oddvar Johansen, Per Mathisen, Jan Gunnar Hoff, Olga Konkova, Hallgeir Pedersen, Mimmi Hammar, Alex Acuna, Frode Nymo, Tore Johansen, Roger Johansen, Terje Venaas, Bjørn Alterhaug

== Discography ==
=== With Kjersti Stubø Quartet ===
- 2001: My Shining Hour (Blue Jersey)
- 2011: How High is the Sky (Bolage)

=== With Kjersti Stubø Quintet ===
- 2018: Notis (Bolage), (Jørn Øien, Håvard Stubø, Mats Eilertsen, Håkon Mjåset Johansen)

=== Within Oofotr ===
- 1995: Oofotr (Norske Gram)
- 2001: Oofotr II (Heilo)

=== Within Kvitretten ===
- 1996: Voices (Curling Legs)

=== With a tribute to DumDum Boys ===
- 1999: Solide Saker (Norska Jv)
