= Hanna Paulsberg =

Norwegian jazz musician and composer (born 1987)

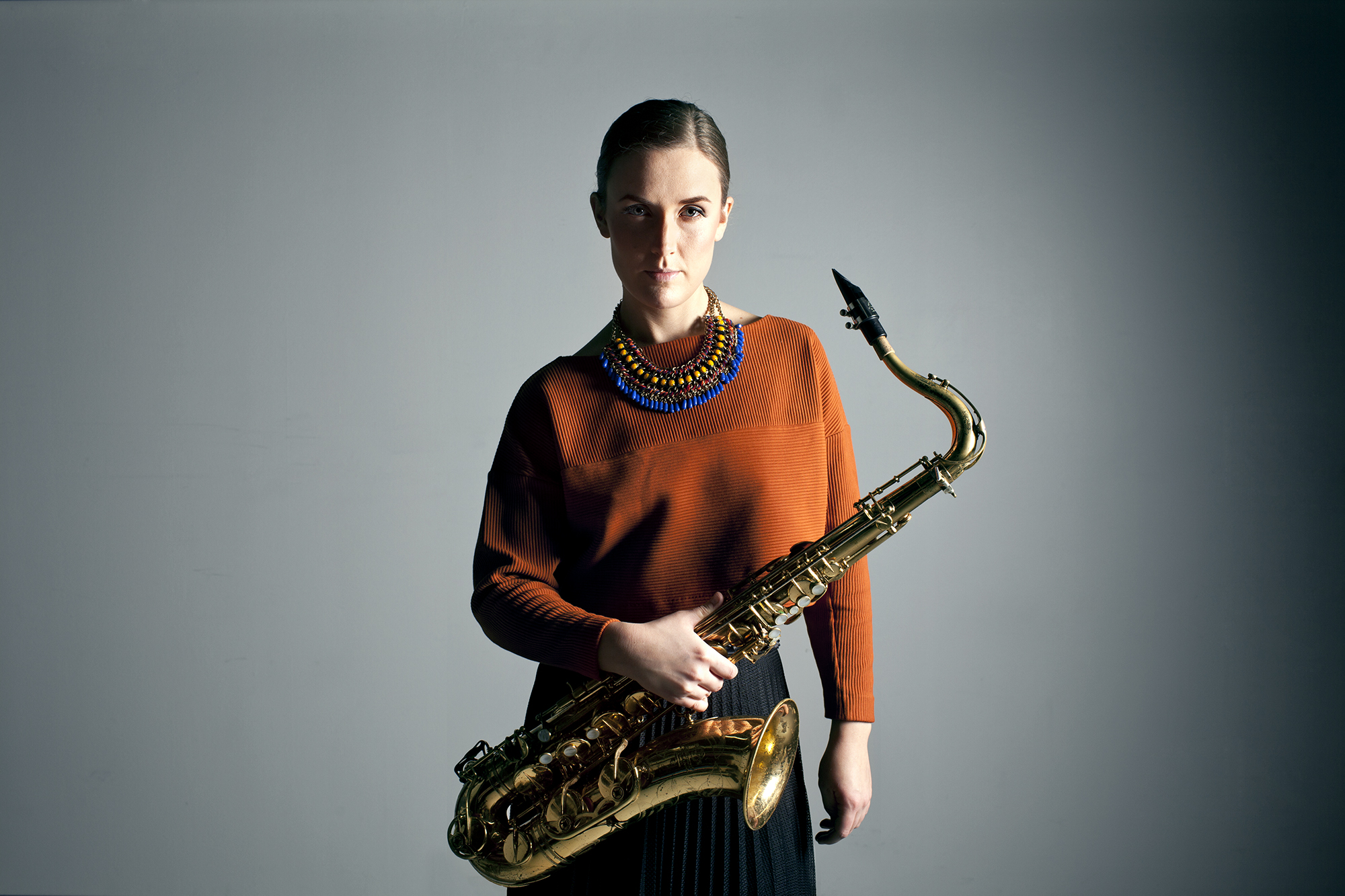
- Paulsberg in April 2014 (Photo: Johannes Selvaag)

Background information
- Born: 13 November 1987 (age 38); Rygge, Østfold
- Origin: Norway
- Genres: Jazz
- Occupations: Musician, composer
- Instrument: Tenor saxophone
- Labels: Odin Records, Grappa, Øra Fonogram
- Website: www.hannapaulsberg.com

Hanna Paulsberg (born 13 November 1987 in Rygge, Norway) is a Norwegian jazz musician (tenor saxophone) and composer.

== Career ==
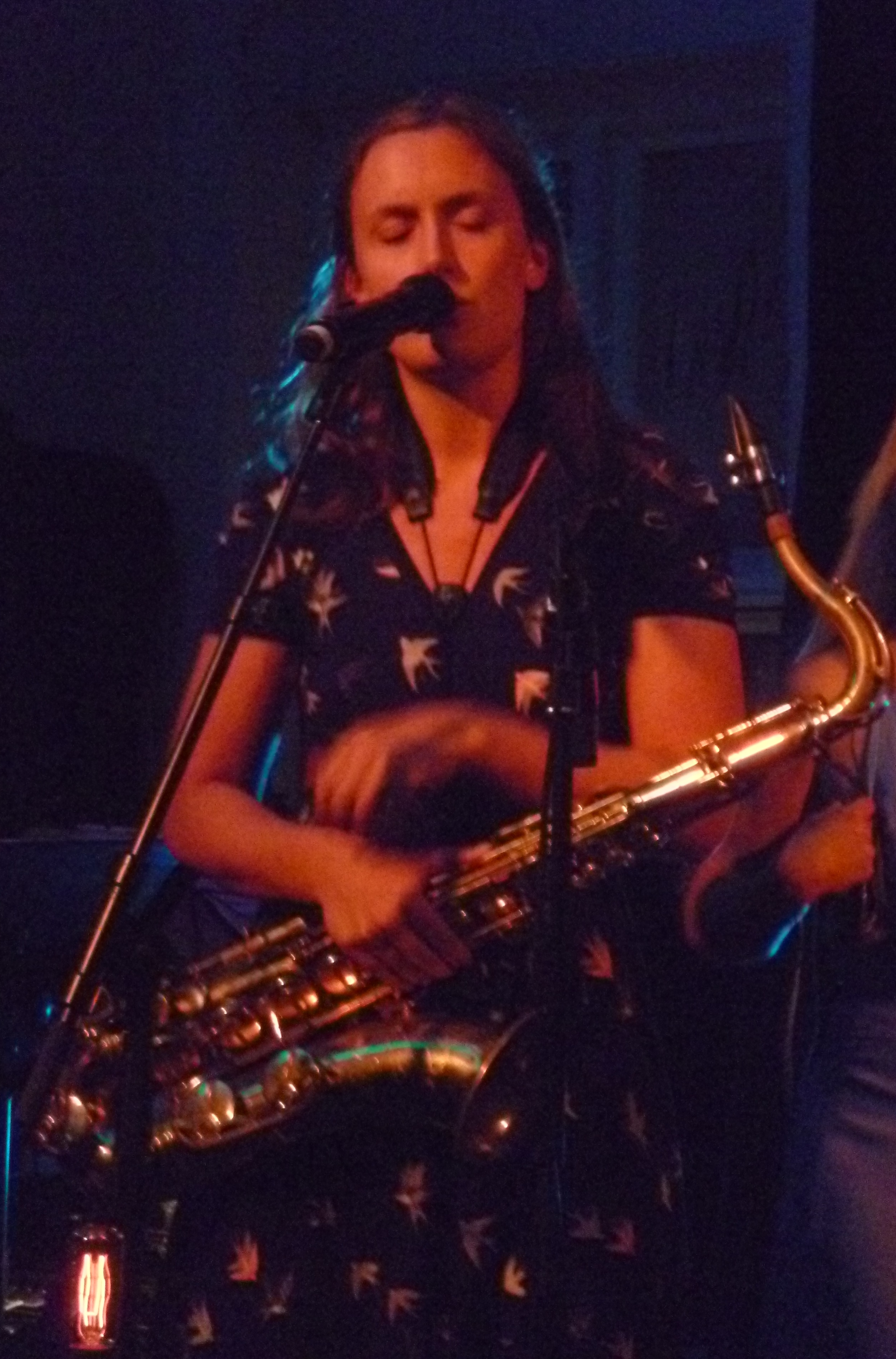
Paulsberg with Pitsj at Ingensteds in Oslo September 10, 2016.

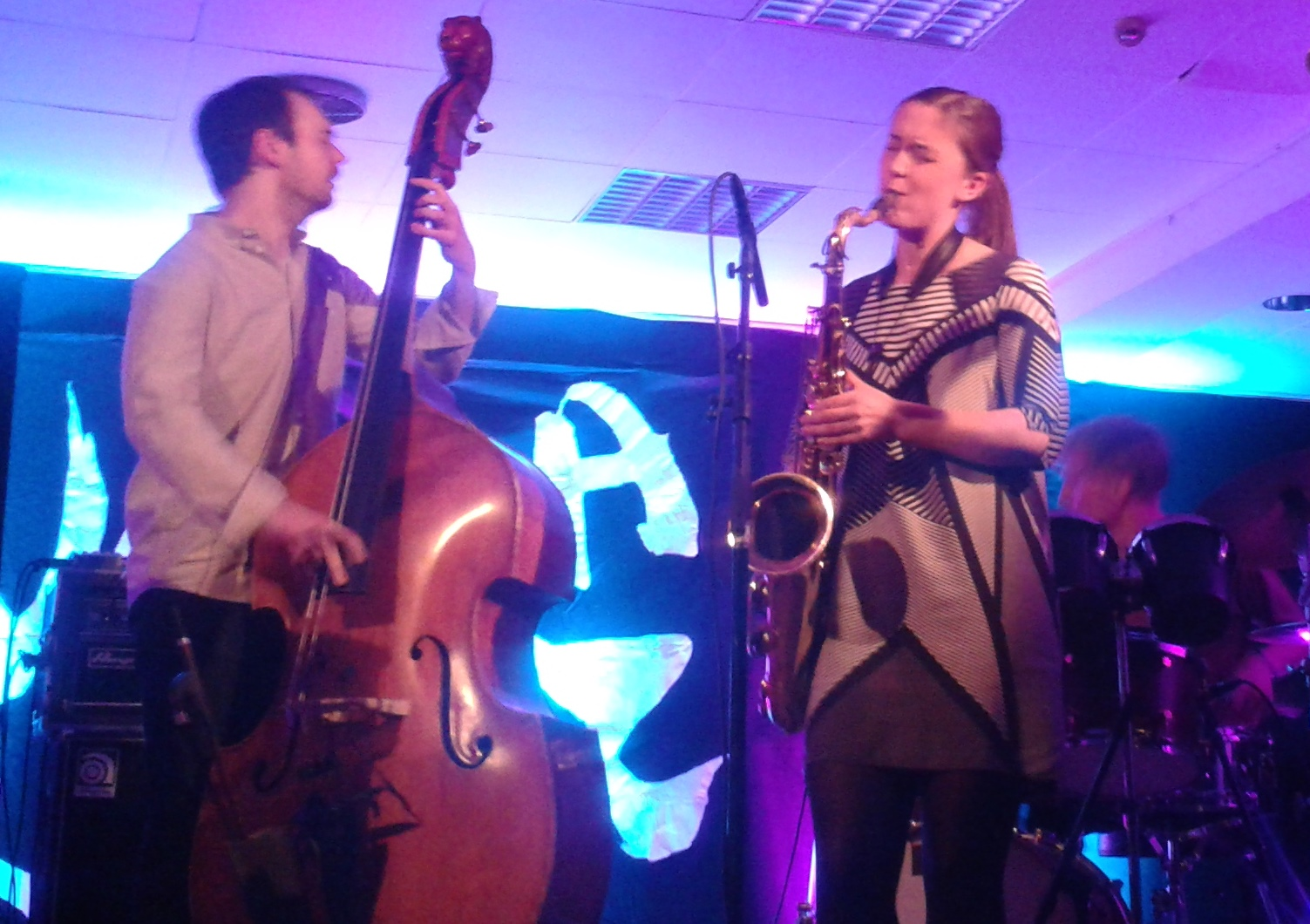
Hanna Paulsberg Concept with Trygve Waldemar Fiske and Hans Hulbækmo at Vossajazz 2016.

Paulsberg started playing saxophone at the age of fifteen, after listening to a cd with American saxophone player Stan Getz. The year after, she started the music program at "Kirkeparken videregående skole" in Moss, where she got her Examen artium in 2009. Later she became a graduate of the Jazz program at Trondheim Musikkonsevatorium in 2011, and released her debut album Waltz For Lilli (2012), including Trygve Waldemar Fiske (double bass), Oscar Grönberg (piano) and Hans Hulbækmo (drums).

Paulsberg often play with the renowned Trondheim Jazz Orchestra. In November 2016 they joined Chick Corea for two nights and four concerts at the Blue Note Jazz Club in New York City.

Hanna Paulsberg is the initiator and songwriter for the vocal trio GURLS including Rohey Taalah and Ellen Andrea Wang. In 2018 they released the album Run, Boy, Run. The album won the 2018 Norwegian Grammy award in the jazz category. They opened for a-ha in a sold out Oslo Spektrum for two nights in a row in February 2018, and they performed at the Norwegian Grammys the same year.

== Honors ==
- 2011: Titled "Young Nordic Jazz Comets"
- 2011: Trondheim Jazz Festival Young Talent Award
- 2015: Titled NTNU Jazzambassador 2015
- 2018: Spellemannsprisen (Norwegian Jazz Grammy) for Run boy, run with GURLS.
- 2019: Rolf Gammleng prisen
- 2020: Ella prisen (Oslo Jazzfestivals hederspris)
- 2021: Spellemannsprisen (Norwegian Jazz Grammy) for Velkommen Håp with FlUkten.

== Discography ==
Hanna Paulsberg Concept

- 2012: Waltz For Lilli (Øra Fonogram)
- 2014: Song For Josia (Øra Fonogram)
- 2016: Eastern Smiles (ODIN Records)
- 2018: Daughter of the Sun (ODIN Records)
- 2025: Himmel over Hav (Grappa Musikkforlag)

GURLS

- 2018: Run Boy, Run (Grappa)

As sideman:

Trondheim Jazz Orchestra

- 2012: The Death Defying Unicorn (Rune Grammofon), feat. Ståle Storløkken & Motorpsycho live at Moldejazz 2010
- 2014: Lion (ACT), feat. Marius Neset
- 2014: Ekko (MNJ Records), feat. Elin Rosseland
- 2017: Antropocen (Fanfare) feat SKRAP

Others

- 2023: Flukten - Flukten (Odin Records 2023)
- 2021: Velkommen Håp - Flukten (Odin Records 2021)
- 2020: If you listen carefully, the music is yours - Gard Nilssen Supersonic Orchestra (Odin Records 2020)
- 2019: The Moon Doesn't Drink - Lyder Øverås Røed (Jazzland 2019)
- 2019: We Are The Granddaughters Of The Witches You Didn't Burn - FINITY (Jazzland 2019)
- 2018: Atlantis - SKRAP (Fanfare 2018)
- 2017: Carla. The Fish - Espen Rud (Curling Legs 2017)
- 2016: I eit landskap - Dag-Filip Roaldsnes Ensemble (NORCD 2016)
- 2016: Reiseliv - Torstein Ekspress (Just for the Records 2016)
- 2016: Scripted Conversations - Simen Kiil Halvorsen (AMP Records 2016)
- 2016: Trøst for stusslige karer - Håkon Paulsberg (Grammofon 2016)
- 2014: Snøkorn - Thomas Torstrup (Just for the records 2014)
- 2014: Elevenette - Dan Peter Sundland (Øra Fonogram 2014)
- 2014: Ændre sida - Håkon Paulsberg (Grammofon 2014)
- 2013: Bror K - Bror K (Selskapsplater 2013)
- 2012: Kjellerbandet - The beat goes on – A tribute to Buddy Rich (Normann Records 2012)
- 2008: Kjellerbandet - Hyllest til Thad Jones - Kjellerbandet/Tore Johansen (Normann Records 2008)
