= Håvard Stubø =

Norwegian jazz guitarist and composer

- Born: Håvard Aasan Stubø; 26 March 1977 (age 49); Narvik, Nordland
- Origin: Norway
- Genres: Jazz
- Occupations: Musician, composer
- Instrument: Guitar
- Website: www.havardstubo.com

Håvard Aasan Stubø (born 26 March 1977 in Narvik, Northern Norway) is a Norwegian jazz musician (guitar) and composer, son and musical successor of Jazz guitarist Thorgeir Stubø (1943–1986) and Grete Karin Aasan Stubø (born 1943), and brother of Jazz singer Kjersti Stubø and Theater director Eirik Stubø.

== Early life ==
Stubø was raised in Narvik surrounded by jazz music. His father died from cancer when he was nine. He picked up the guitar when about twelve, and had his first gigs with local alternative rock bands in Narvik, such as Magnet. After a few years at the University of Oslo and the University of Bergen studying English language and philosophy, he went to study music with the jazz program at the Trondheim Conservatory of Music (2000–2004), where he participated in jazz the groups Marita Røstad & Velvet Lounge Orchestra, Ping Pong and a trio with Tore Johansen and Roger Arntzen. After that, he moved back to Oslo, working as a freelance musician.

== Career ==
Stubø has led band like Nordnorsk Kvintett also known as North, with Trond Sverre Hansen (drums), Atle Nymo (saxophone), Andreas Amundsen (bass) and Jørn Øien (piano), Håvard Stubø Quartet with Knut Riisnæs (tenor saxophone), Torbjörn Zetterberg (bass) and Håkon Mjåset Johansen (drums), JUPITER with Magnus Forsberg (drums) and Steinar Nickelsen (organ) featuring Jonas Kullhammar, Jazz & Fly Fishing, Håvard Stubø Trio with Roger Arntzen and Torstein Lofthus, Wes! with Daniel Franck and Håkon M. Johansen, and others.

In 2007 he started a record label, Bolage, together with a good friend, Tord Rønning Krogtoft. They have released more than 18 albums so far. Throughout his career as a jazz musician, Stubø has played with many talented musicians, like Tomasz Stanko, Jimmy Owens, Arve Henriksen, Olavi Louhivuori, among others, and appeared on many international Jazz festivals like Kongsberg Jazz Festival, Nattjazz in Bergen Municipality and Vossajazz in Voss Municipality.

== Honors ==
- Awarded the Spellemannprisen 2009 in the class Jazz, for the record Way Up (Way Down)

== Discography ==
With Håvard Stubø Quartet

- 2009: Way Up (Way Down) (Bolage)
- 2011: Spring Roll Insomnia (Bolage)
- 2014: Vilhelmina (Bolage)

With JUPITER

- 2005: Ignition (AIM Records)
- 2006: Live (AIM Records) with Jonas Kullhammar, from Glenn Miller Café in Stockholm
- 2007: III^{2} (Bolage) with Jonas Kullhammar

With Marita Røstad

- 2007: Silent Sunday (Magica Records)

With Wes!

- 2008: Wes! (Bolage)

With Jazz And Fly Fishing

- 2009: Tight Lines Quartet (Jazz And Fly Fishing)
- 2011: Slow Walking Water (Bolage)
