= Steinar Raknes =

Norwegian jazz upright bassist and composer

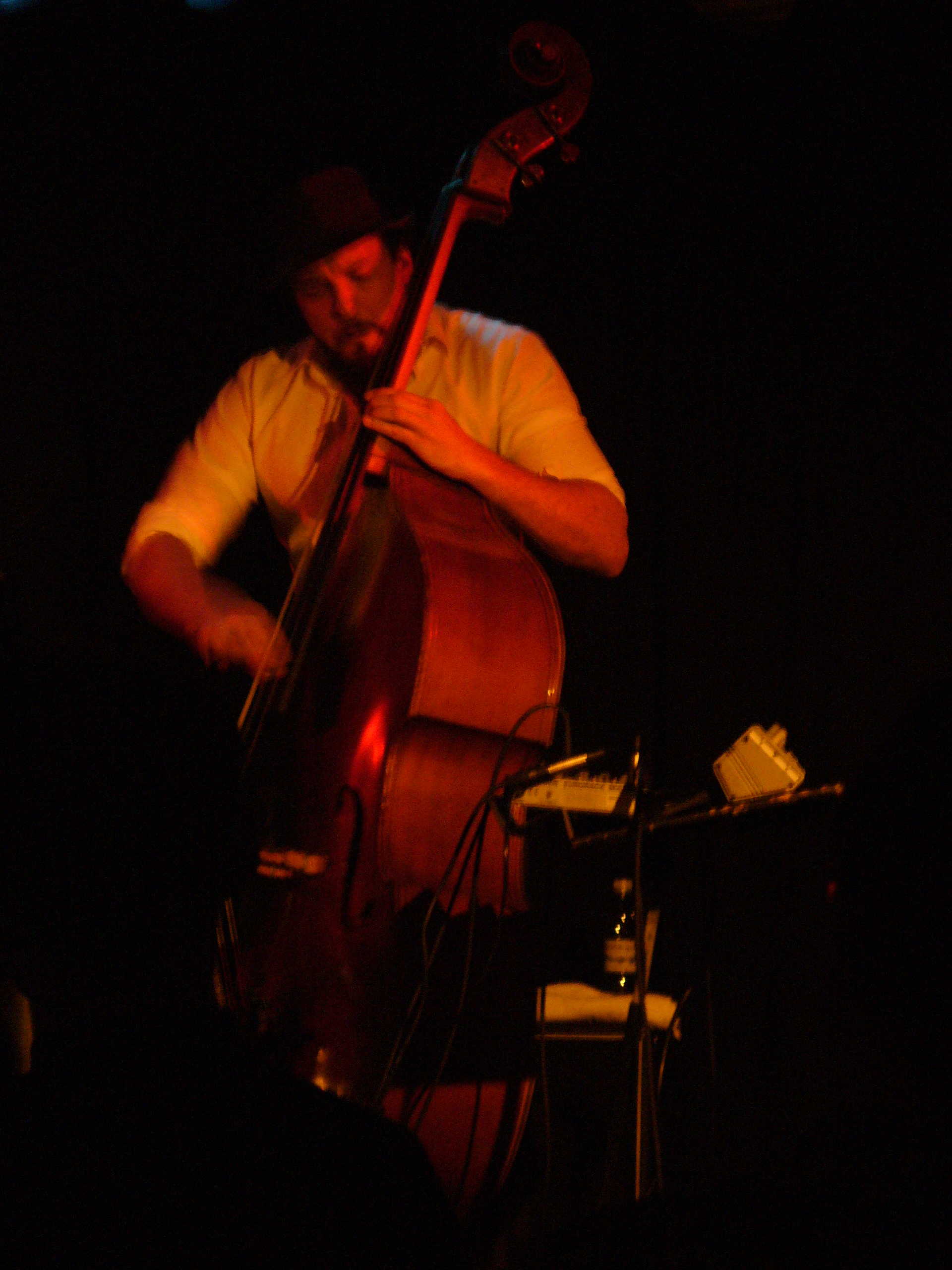
- Steinar Raknes at the Bergen Jazz Club "Sardinen", November 2012.

Background information
- Born: 22 March 1975 (age 51); Midsund Municipality, Møre og Romsdal
- Origin: Norway
- Genres: Jazz
- Occupations: Musician, composer
- Instruments: Upright bass, vocals
- Labels: Jazzland Recordings; Jazzaway Records; Bergland Productions; Park Grammofon; Reckless Records
- Website: www.steinarraknes.com

Steinar Raknes (born 22 March 1975) is a Norwegian jazz bassist, composer, and the younger brother of Jazz singer and pianist Eldbjørg Raknes. He is considered to be one of the most talented double bass players of his generation in Norway, and is known from collaborations with the like of Chick Corea, Michael Brecker, Bobby McFerrin, Ola Kvernberg and Hallgeir Pedersen.

== Career ==
Raknes was born in Midsund Municipality. He started to play bass at the age fifteen, graduated from the Music school in Kristiansund in 1994, and from the "Sund Folkehøgskole" 1995. As a student on the Jazz program at Trondheim Musikkonservatorium (1995–98) he established the bands The Core and Urban Connection (bouth in 1996). He played with the Trondheim Jazz Orchestra featuring Chick Corea as soloist, and the quartet "BounceTones". He contributed to the cooperated broadcast NRK/EBU "Jazz jorda rundt" as the bassist within the Hallgeir Pedersen Trio 2003.

Raknes has played on releases by Jens Arne Molvær (1998) and Ole Reinlund (2003), and is also steady in the band line up with Ola Kvernberg, played in the Kirsti Huke Trio and initiated Shagma in 2004. In 2008 he debuted as solo artist with the album Tangos, Ballads & More, followed up in 2012 by the album Stillhouse. He has also worked as instrumental double bass teacher on the Jazz program at Trondheim Musikkonservatorium.

== Discography ==
=== Solo albums ===
- 2008: Tangos, Ballads & More (Park Grammofon), with Ola Kvernberg, John Pål Inderberg & Håkon Mjåset Johansen
- 2012: Stillhouse (Reckless Records), with Mickey Raphael, Solveig Slettahjell, Unni Wilhelmsen, Kaja Bremnes, Paolo Vinaccia & Andrew Utnem

=== Collaborative works ===
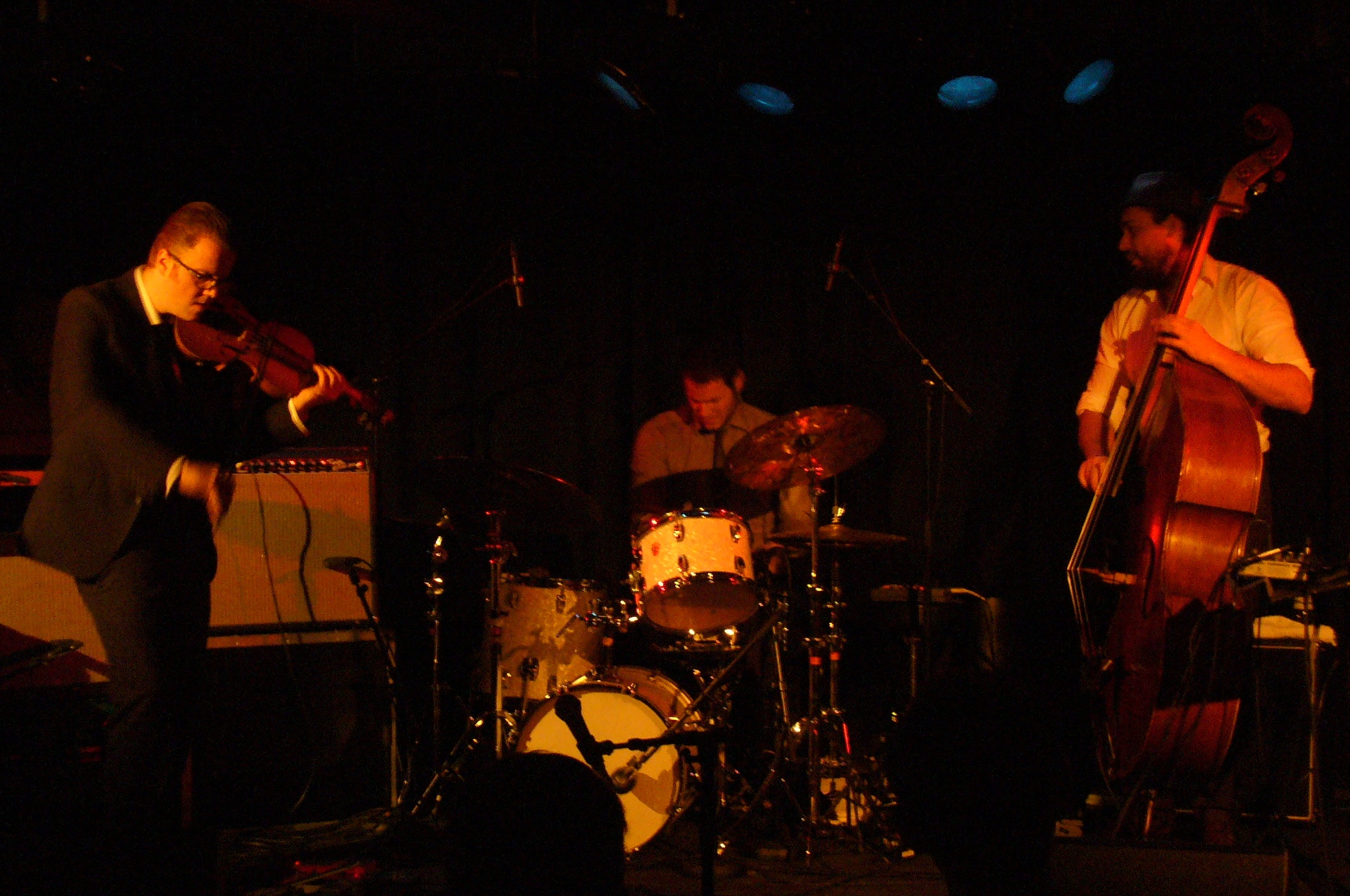
Ola Kvernberg, Erik Nylander and Steinar Raknes with the Jazzland Community at the Jazz club Sardinen, USF Verftet in November 2012.

Within Urban Connection

- 2001: Urban Connection (Bergland Productions)
- 2002: French Only (Bergland Productions)
- 2004: UC 3 (Bergland Productions)

With Siri Gjære

- Love Seriously Damages Health (2001, Bergland Prod.)

Within The Core

- 2004: Vision – (Jazzaway Records)
- 2006: Blue Sky – (Jazzaway Records)
- 2007: Office Essentials – (Jazzland Recordings)
- 2010: Party – (Moserobie Music)

Within "Shagma"

- 2005:Music – (Jazzaway Records)

Within Trondheim Jazz Orchestra

- 2005: Live in Molde – (MNJ Records), feat. Chick Corea

Within Ola Kvernberg Trio

- 2006: Night//Driver – (Jazzland Recordings)
- 2009: Folk – (Jazzland Recordings)

Within The Indian Core

- 2007: The Indian Core – (Grappa Music)

With Kirsti Huke

- 2007: Deloo – (Grappa Music)
- 2009: Kirsti Huke – (Fairplay)

With The Bergen Big Band

- 2007: Meditations on Coltrane – (Grappa Music), feat. The Core

With Håvard Lund

- 2010: My Sister Said – (Turn Left Prod.)
