= Håkon Mjåset Johansen =

Norwegian jazz drummer and composer

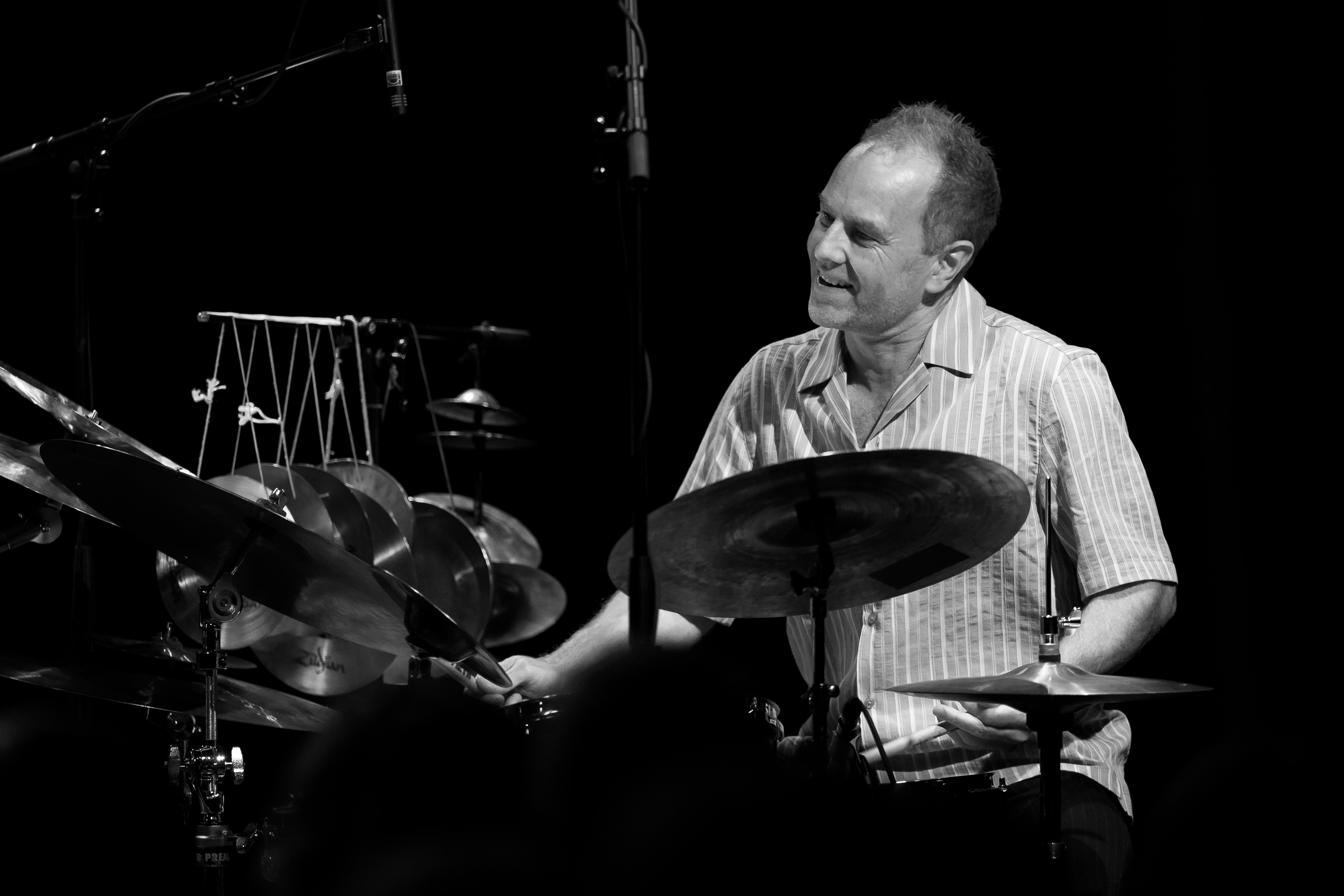
- Mjåset Johansen (2025)

Background information
- Born: 1 August 1975 (age 50); Trondheim, Sør-Trøndelag
- Origin: Norway
- Genres: Jazz
- Occupations: Musician, composer
- Instrument: Drums

Håkon Mjåset Johansen (born 1 August 1975 in Trondheim, Norway) is a Norwegian jazz drummer and composer, known from playing with the Trondheim Jazz Orchestra featuring Chick Corea at Moldejazz 2000, cooperations with Bugge Wesseltoft's New Conceptions of Jazz, Ole Morten Vågan's Motif, Siri Gjære's Cricket Club and the Ola Kvernberg Trio. He has also contributed to releases with Jon Larsen, the Atle Nymo/Frode Nymo Quartet and Jan Garbarek.

== Career ==
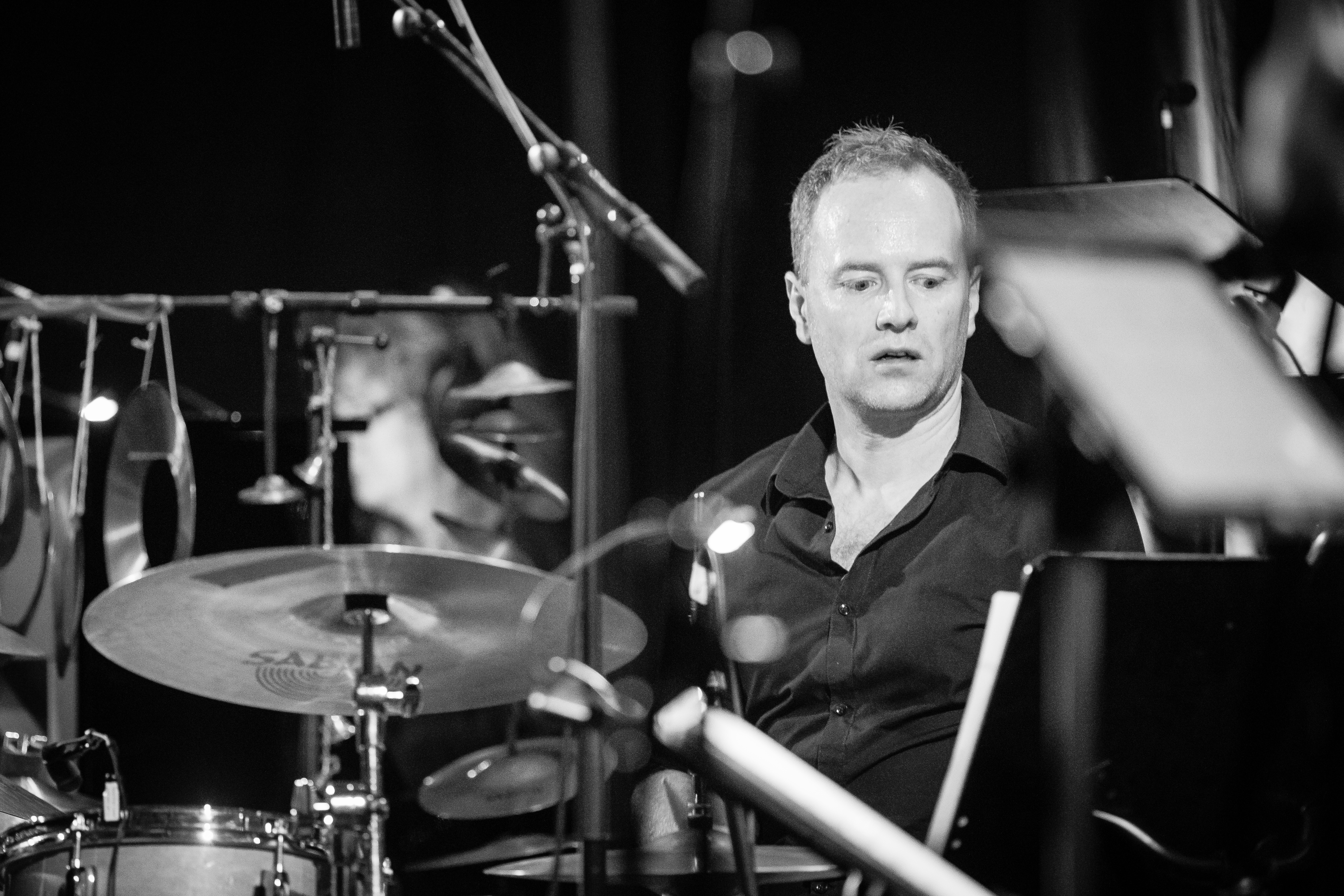
Mjåset Johansen at Jazz på Jølst October 12, 2018. Photo: Tore Sætre

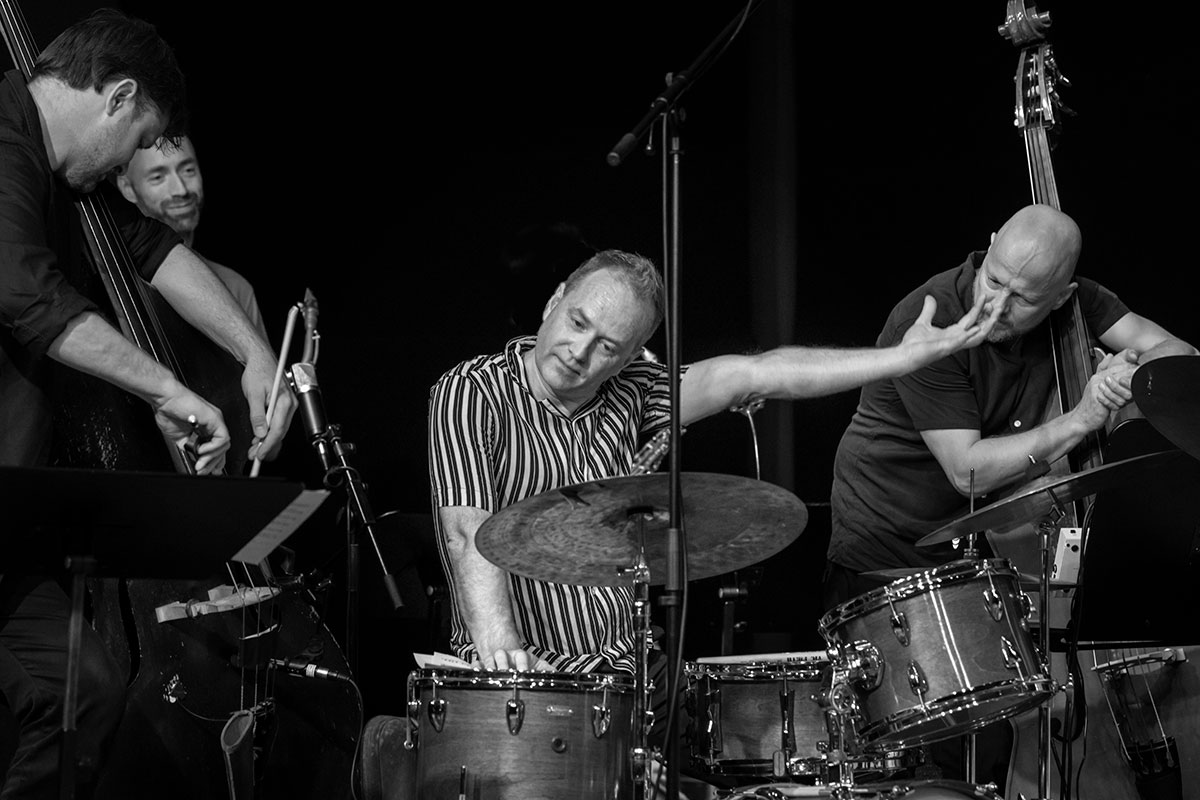
With Supersonic-Orchestra at Jazz Nights Festival, Denmark 2022.

Johansen was educated on the Jazz program at Trondheim Musikkonservatorium, where he and fellow students established the band Urban Connection in 1996 and Come Shine (1999–2003). He also plays with a series of other bands and participates on many recordings.

With the Håvard Wiik Trio he has performed with Ole Morten Vågan, and at the Oslo Jazz Festival 2006, he played with Jon Gordon in quartet with Roger Arntzen and Asbjørn Lerheim. He has also been a regular member of Håvard Stubø Quartet.

== Honors ==
- 1998: This year's Young Jazz Musicians
- 2000: 1st Prize in "Avignon Jazz Contest"
- 2001: "Young Nordic Jazz Comets" in København, with the band "Motif»
- 2001: "Spellemannsprisen" for the album Urban Connection, with "Urban Connection»
- 2002: "Spellemannsprisen" for the album Do do that voodoo, with "Come Shine»
- 2013: Kongsberg Jazz Award

== Discography (in selection) ==
With Come Shine

- 2000: Come Shine (Curling Legs)
- 2002: Do do that voodoo (Curling Legs), awarded Spellemannprisen 2002
- 2003: In concert (Curling Legs), with Kringkastingsorkesteret at Kongsberg Jazz Festival

With Urban Connection

- 2001: Urban Connection (Bergland Productions)
- 2002: French Only (Bergland Productions)
- 2004: UC 3 (Bergland Productions)

With Motif

- 2004: Motif (AIM Record)
- 2005: Expansion (AIM Record)
- 2007: Hello..my name is (Vidzone)
- 2008: Apo Calypso (Jazzland Records)
- 2010: Facienda (Jazzland Records)
- 2011: Art Transplant (Clean Feed), with Axel Dörner
- 2016: My Head Is Listening (Clean Feed Records)

With Svein Olav Herstad Trio

- 2004: Suite For Simmons (Jazzaway Records), featuring Sonny Simmons
- 2007: Inventio (Jazzaway Records)

With Excess Luggage (Trio including with Steinar Nickelsen and Vigleik Storaas)

- 2007: Excess Luggage (Park Grammofon)
- 2011: Hand Luggage Only (Parallell)

With Maryland (Quartet including with Maria Kannegaard, Håkon Kornstad and Ole Morten Vågan)

- 2008: Maryland (Moserobie Music)
- 2009: Maryland Live! (Moserobie Music), recorded at Vossajazz 2008

With Solid (Trio including with Bjørn Vidar Solli and Daniel Buner Formo)

- 2008: Happy Accidents (AIM Records)
- 2011: Visitor (Parallell Records), with Seamus Blake

With Håvard Stubø Quartet

- 2009: Way Up (Way Down) (Bolage)
- 2011: Spring Roll Insomnia (Bolage)
- 2014: Vilhelmina (Bolage)

With IPA (Quartet including with Atle Nymo, Ingebrigt Håker Flaten and Magnus Broo)

- 2009: Lorena (Bolage)
- 2011: It's A Delicate Thing (Bolage)
- 2013: Bubble (Moserobie Music)

With Hegge

- 2017: Vi är ledsna men du får inte längre vara barn (Particular Recordings Collective)

With others

- 1999: Horace Hello (Gemini Records), with Oddbjørn Blindheim Trio
- 2007: The Arcades project (Jazzland Recordings), within Håvard Wiik Trio
- 2008: The Jimmy Carl Black story (Hot Club Records), with Jon Larsen
- 2008: Complete Communion (Bolage), in trio with Atle Nymo and Ingebrigt Håker Flaten
- 2008: Wes! (Bolage), within Wes Trio including with Håvard Stubø and Daniel Frank
- 2011: How High is the Sky (Bolage), within Kjersti Stubø Band
- 2011: Examination of What (Losen Records), within Håvard Fossum/Børge-Are Halvorsen Quartet, including Håvard Fossum (saxophone), Børge Are Halvorsen (saxophone) & Jens Fossum (double bass)
- 2013: Live in Tokyo (Reckless Records), within Steinar Raknes Quartet recorded 2011

Awards
| Preceded by Ola Kvernberg | Recipient of the Kongsberg Jazz Award; 2013 | Succeeded by Mathias Eick |
