= Hans Hulbækmo =

Norwegian musician and composer (born 1989)

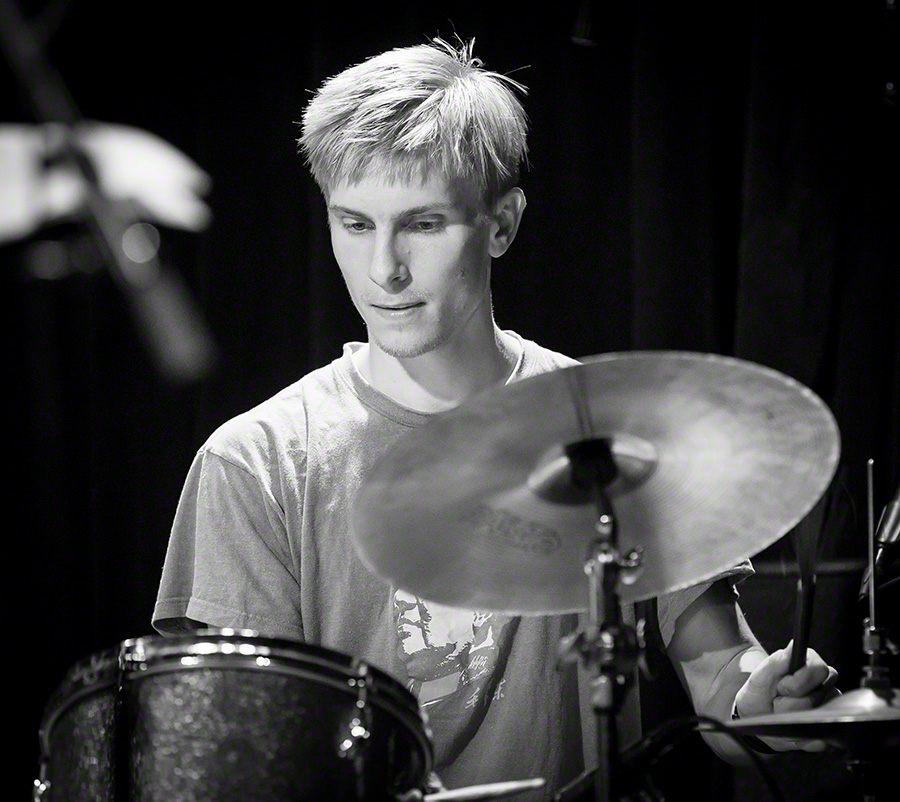
- Hulbekmo at Oslo jazzfestival 2016

Background information
- Born: 1989 (age 36–37); Tolga, Hedmark
- Origin: Norway
- Genres: Jazz
- Occupations: Musician, composer
- Instruments: Drums, percussion, vibraphone
- Labels: Dayladore Collective, Hubro, Nabovarsel
- Website: Hans Hulbækmo on Myspace

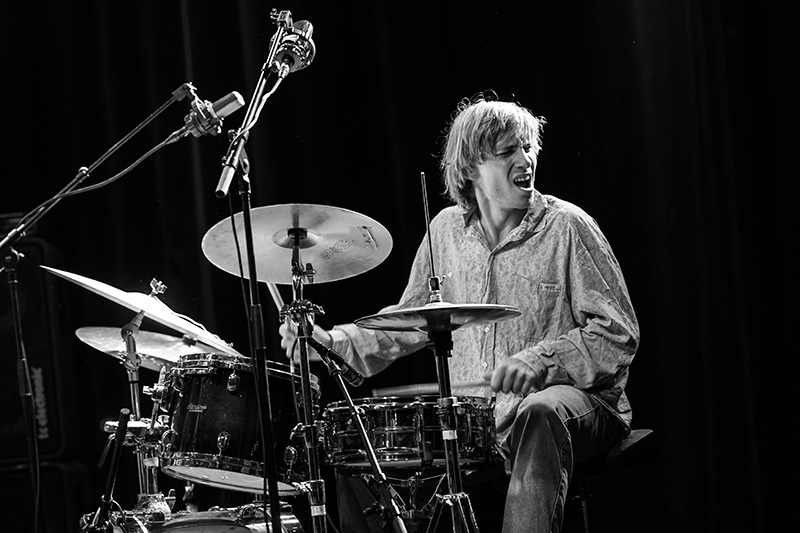
Hulbækmo at Aarhus Festival, Denmark, 2017

Hans Hulbækmo (born 1989) is a Norwegian musician (drums, percussion, saw, Jew's harp and vibraphone) and composer, son of the traditional folk musicians Tone Hulbækmo and Hans Fredrik Jacobsen, brother of pianist Alf Hulbækmo, and known from several Norwegian bands as Broen, Hanna Paulsberg Concept, Skadedyr, Moskus, Atomic, Kalenda Maya and his collaboration with Anders Røine.

== Career ==
Hulbækmo studied music on the Jazz program at Trondheim Musikkonsevatorium, NTNU, where he joined the acoustic jazz band "Moskus" together with fellow students, Fredrik Luhr Dietrichson (double bass) from Haugesund and Anja Lauvdal (piano) from Flekkefjord, at NTNU. Their debut album was Salmesykkel (2012) Hulbækmo also played in "Your Headlights Are On" with a self-titled debut album Your Headlights Are On (2011) and "Snøskred" debuting with the album Whiteout (2012), with Anja Lauvdal.

In 2014, Hulbækmo joined the group Atomic, replacing founding percussionist Paal Nilssen-Love.

In 2015, he released the album "Yoga" with the band Broen.

== Honors ==
- 2011: Grappas Debutantpris, with "Moskus"
- 2011: Young Nordic Jazz Comets, with "Hanna Paulsberg Concept"
- 2011: Trondheim Jazz Festivals Talent Price, with "Hanna Paulsberg Concept"

== Discography ==
Broen

- 2013: Broen/Invader Ace: The split jump drug EP (10" EP) (Kakao Musikk)
- 2015: Yoga' (LP) (Nabovarsel)
- 2017: I <3 Art (Su Tissue)

Moskus

- 2012: Salmesykkel (Hubro)
- 2014: Mestertyven (Hubro)
- 2016: Ulv Ulv (Hubro)
- 2018: Mirakler (Hubro)

Hanna Paulsberg Concept

- 2012: Waltz For Lilli (Øra Fonogram)
- 2014: Song For Josia (Øra Fonogram)
- 2016: Eastern Smiles (Odin)

Skadedyr

- 2013: Kongekrabbe (Hubro)
- 2016: Culturen (Hubro)
- 2018: Musikk! (Hubro)

Atomic

- 2015: Lucidity (Jazzland)
- 2017: Six Easy Pieces (Odin)

Anders Røine

- 2016: Kristine Valdresdatter (Ta:lik)

Your Headlights Are On

- 2011: Your Headlights Are On (Dayladore Collective)

Oluf Dimitri Røe

- 2011: Meltemi – wind of Mykonos (Etnisk Musikklubb)

Hans Fredrik Jacobsen

- 2013: Trå dansen (Grappa)

Tone Hulbækmo

- 2016: Stifinner (Grappa)

Snøskred

- 2012: We are (7" single) (Riot Factory, Sad songs for happy people)
- 2012: Whiteout (Riot Factory, Sad songs for happy people)

Therese Aune

- 2012: Billowing Shadows Flickering Light (Riot Factory)

Sommerfuglfisk

- 2013: The Guest House (Bergland Productions)
