= Gunnar Andreas Berg =

- Born: 14 January 1954 (age 71); Trondheim, Norway
- Origin: Norwegian
- Genres: Jazz, rock, pop
- Occupation(s): Musician, Label Manager
- Instrument: Guitarist
- Years active: 1974–present

Gunnar Andreas Berg (born 14 January 1954) is a Norwegian musician, educator, owner of the record label "Bergland Productions". He is known from cooperations with musicians like Palle Mikkelborg, Ole Edvard Antonsen, Bjørn Alterhaug, Siri Gjære, Åge Aleksandersen, and Morten Harket.

== Career ==
Berg is educated in classical guitar at the Trondheim Musikkonservatorium as well as Berklee College of Music i Boston. Later he was employed as Associated Professor on the Jazz program at NTNU.

Berg has released four solo albums.

== Honors ==
- Gammleng-prisen 2002 in the class Studio

== Discography ==
- Snowdawn (Arctic Records, 1980), with Sissel Kjøl Berg and Bård Ustad Svendsen (vocals), Carl Haakon Waadeland (drums), Terje Bjørklund (piano), Helge Sletvold (bass), and John Pål Inderberg (saxophone)
- Supernatural (Norsk Plateproduksjon, 1993), with Odd Magne Gridseth (bass) and Kim Ofstad (drums)
- The Music Machine (Curling Legs, 1996), with various artists
- Music Read in Teeth and Claws (Bergland Productions, 2008) with Yoruba Andabo from Cuba
- Two We Go (2009), with Henning Sommerro
