= John Pål Inderberg =

Norwegian jazz saxophonist (born 1950)

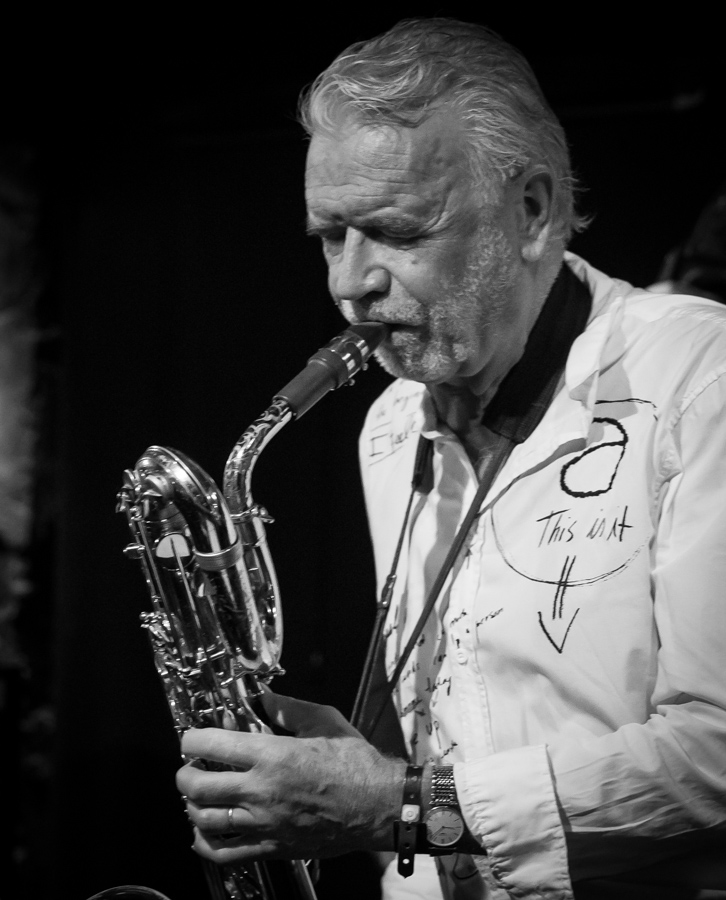
- Inderberg in 2016

Background information
- Born: 6 August 1950 (age 76); Steinkjer, Nord-Trøndelag, Norway
- Genres: Jazz
- Occupations: Musician, composer
- Instrument: Saxophone
- Website: www.inderberg.com

John Pål Inderberg (born 6 August 1950 Steinkjer, Norway) is a versatile saxophonist and one of the leading traditional musicians in Norway. His playing synthethises many different styles, not least when in partnership with Norwegian and American jazz musicians - players as contrasting as Gil Evans and Lee Konitz.

== Career ==
As an earlier member of the new cool quartet, Inderberg gave new popularity to the collective art of improvisation in the 1950s. Inderberg's soprano and baritone sax can be heard on a wide range of recordings. He has toured and recorded with Lee Konitz and Warne Marsh (saxophone), Chet Baker (trumpet), Bob Brookmeyer (trombone), as well as Siri Gellein and Henning Sommerro. He was previously member of Gil Evans' Scandinavian ensemble and has put his mark on several recordings with poet Jan Erik Vold.

Inderberg is a member of the EBU-band in 1980 and 1998. Besides his performing career, he holds the post Teacher of Improvisation and joint head of the jazz department at the Trondheim Musikkonservatorium, NTNU. He has received the Norwegian Jazz Forum award in 1991, known as the Buddy statuette. He was also awarded the Lindemanprisen 2010.

== Honors ==
- 1990: Buddyprisen
- 2010: Lindemanprisen

== Discography ==
Solo albums

- 2001: Baritone Landscape (Gemini Records)
- 2005: Sval Draum (Taurus Records)

Collaborative albums

- 1979: Moments (Arctic Records), with Bjørn Alterhaug
- 1980: Snowdown (Bergland Production), with Gunnar Andreas Berg
- 1987: Sax Of A Kind (Hot Club Records), with Warne Marsh
- 1988: Blodig Alvor Na Na Na Na Na (CBS), with DumDum Boys
- 1989: Annbjørg (Kirkelig Kulturverksted), with Annbjørg Lien
- 1990: Blackbird (Sonor Records), with Siri's Svale Band
- 1991: Constellations (Odin Records), with Bjørn Alterhaug
- 1991: Sangen Vi Glemte (Idut), with Frode Fjellheim
- 1992: Nattjazz 20 År (Grappa Music), with various artists
- 1995: Steps Towards A Dream (Odin Records), with Lee Konitz
- 1995: Oofotr (Norske Gram), with Oofotr
- 1995: Monk Moods (Odin Records), with Knut Kristiansen
- 1996: Her Er Huset Som Per Bygde (Hot Club Records), with Jan Erik Vold
- 1996: Svarrabærje (Kirkelig Kulturverksted), with Henning Sommerro
- 1997: Vårsøg (Norske Gram), with Henning Sommerro
- 2004: Across (Vossa Jazz Records), with Svein Folkvord
- 2005: We Are? (Jazzaway Records), with Eirik Hegdal & Trondheim Jazz Orchestra
- 2005: Live In Molde (MNJ Records), with Chick Corea & Trondheim Jazz Orchestra
- 2005: Tribute (MNJ Records), with Vigleik Storaas & Trondheim Jazz Orchestra
- 2007: Subtrio (Vossa Jazz Records), with Subtrio
- 2007: Melancholy Delight (Resonant Music), with Espen Rud
- 2007: Live In Oslo (Ponca Jazz Records), with Lee Konitz
- 2007: Live At Sting (Dravle Records), with Subtrio feat. Paolo Fresu
- 2008: Tangos, Ballads & More (Park Grammofon), with Steinar Raknes
- 2008: Wood And Water (MNJ Records), with Eirik Hegdal & Trondheim Jazz Orchestra
- 2009: Songlines (Ponca Jazz Records), with Bjørn Alterhaug
- 2009: What If? A Counterfactual Fairytale (MNJ Records), with Erlend Skomsvoll & Trondheim Jazz Orchestra
- 2011: Dobbeldans (Curling Legs), with Espen Rud
- 2011: Fine Together (Inner Ear), with Roger Johansen feat. Georg Riedel
- 2012: Vegen Åt Deg (Øra Fonogram), with Heidi Skjerve
- 2012: Løvsamleren (Curling Legs), with Espen Rud
- 2014: Exit Sigurd Bjørhovde Groups. where Inderberg is heard on Tenor Saxophone in 3 recordings from 1974.
- 2019: Live in Oslo (Jazzland Recordings) with Baker Hansen

Awards
Preceded by Per Husby	Recipient of the Buddyprisen; 1990	Succeeded by Stein Erik Tafjord
Preceded by No award in 2004	Recipient of the Open class Gammlengprisen; 2005	Succeeded by No award in 2006
