= Norske Gram =

Norwegian record label

Norske Gram was a Norwegian record label founded in 1993 in Trondheim by music executive Gunnar Hordvik, as a continuation of Plateselskapet, which closed that year.

The company mostly released titles from artists from Trøndelag, as well as reissues of the founder's previous company or Swedish rreleases. The company and its founder won the 1996 Bjellesauprisen. In 1998, the company had a market share of 22.4%; the company grew thanks to the increased number of sales of CDs by its local artists, at a time when other labels barely touched the local music scene.

The label was acquired by EMI in October 1999 and had Arve Løberg as its CEO until 2001, when Stein Vanebo took over. Norske Gram ceased operating in 2002 after the EMI-Virgin merger by order of EMI, then in 2003, it announced the relocation of its headquarters to Oslo, and with a new label (backed by Denmark) absorbing its artist inventory. Hordvik continued in the music industry with the founding of his new label Norwave in 2002, until he died in a canoe accident in 2005, ending the company.

== Artists with Norske Gram releases ==
- Åge Aleksandersen
- Adamseplene
- D.D.E.
- Postgirobygget
- Henning Kvitnes
- Terje Tysland
- Aftenlandet
- Funhouse
- Soda (took part in Stjerner i sikte and Popstars)
- Nidaros Cathedral Boys' Choir
- Trondheim Soloists
- Oslo Gospel Choir
- Bjølsen Valsemølle
- Brazz Brothers
- Arnsteins
- Ola Uteligger
- Claudia Scott
- Too Far Gone
- Flying Norwegians
- Björn Afzelius
- Scandinavia
