= Njål Ølnes =

Norwegian jazz saxophonist, composer and educator (born 1965)

- Born: 24 September 1965 (age 60); Sogndal Municipality, Sogn og Fjordane
- Origin: Norway
- Genres: Jazz
- Occupations: Musician, composer
- Years active: Saxophone
- Label: Jazzaway
- Member of: Dingobats
- Website: Njål Ølnes on Myspace

Njål Ølnes (born 24 September 1965 in Sogndal Municipality, Norway) is a Norwegian jazz musician (tenor saxophone), composer and jazz educator currently residing in Nesodden Municipality.

== Career ==
Ølnes is a graduate of the Jazz program at the Trondheim Musikkonsevatorium (1988–92), and was for many years music teacher at Sund Folkehøgskole, where he has been a major driving force behind the vital jazz studies. He was also a perennial leader of Inderøyningen Jazz Forum and organizer of the little connoisseur jazz festival "Soddjazz" in Inderøy Municipality. He also teaches jazz at Trondheim Musikkonsevatorium.

Ølnes' performances include the Woodwind trio Decoy with Trygve Seim and Håvard Lund, including one album release, within Dingobats together with Eirik Hegdal (saxophones), Thomas T. Dahl (guitar), Mats Eilertsen (bass) and Sverre Gjørvad (drums), including one album releases, within African Pepperbirds together with Bjørn Ole Solberg (alto saxophone), Vigleik Storaas/Erlend Slettevoll (piano), Mattis Kleppen (bass) and Tor Haugerud/Kenneth Kapstad (drums), including one album release, within Gibrish together with Michael Francis Duch (bass), Kjetil Møster (tenor saxophone) and Tor Haugerud (drums).

Ølnes is currently most active in the trio BMX, together with guitarist Thomas T. Dahl and drummer Øyvind Skarbø.

== Discography ==
Within Dingobats

- 1998: The New Dingobats Generation (Turn Left Prod)
- 2002: Pöck (Bergland Productions), which featured Live Maria Roggen (vocals)
- 2004: Follow (Jazzaway Records)

With Eirik Hegdal & Trondheim Jazz Orchestra

- 2005: We Are? (Jazzaway Records)
- 2008: Wood And Water (MNJ Records)

With Afric Pepperbirds

- 2006: Cape Point (Bergland Productions)

With BMX

- 2010: Bergen Open (NorCD), including with Øyvind Skarbø, Thomas T. Dahl & Per Jørgensen
