= Siri Gjære =

Norwegian jazz vocalist (born 1972)

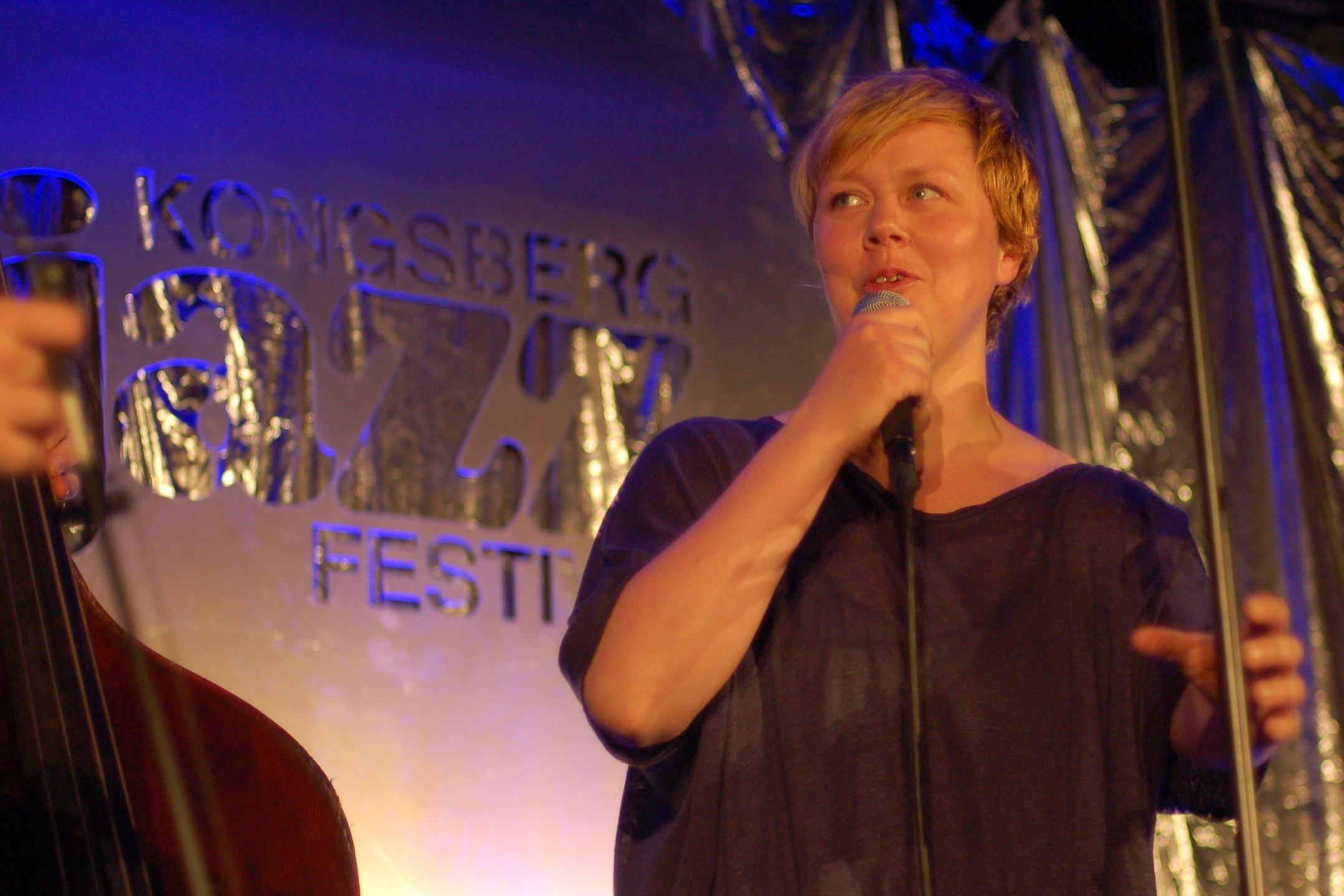
- Siri Gjære at Kongsberg Jazz Festival (Photo: Thomas Bjørndahl)

Background information
- Born: 1 February 1972 (age 54); Trondheim, Sør-Trøndelag
- Origin: Norway
- Genres: Jazz
- Occupations: Musician, composer
- Instrument: Vocals
- Website: Siri Gjære on Myspace

Siri Gjære (born 1 February 1972 in Trondheim, Norway) is a Norwegian jazz vocalist from Levanger Municipality, known for her collaborations with musicians like Tord Gustavsen, Stian Carstensen, Eirik Hegdal, Maria Kannegaard, Jarle Bernhoft, Eldbjørg Raknes, and Steinar Raknes.

== Career ==
Gjære was educated at the jazz program at Trondheim Musikkonservatorium (1995–1997), where she performed with Trondheim Jazz Orchestra (e.g. We Are? 2005, with Eirik Hegdal). Since 1999 she has been involved with the band "Cricket Club" (with Andreas Aase and Steinar Raknes), the Jazz duo "Aire & Angels" with Tord Gustavsen (two releases), and the soul-rock band "Moving Oos".

Gjære has also worked with children's music and church music, then in cooperation with Eldbjørg Raknes, Stian Carstensen and Steinar Raknes. She was This year's county artist of Sør-Trøndelag 2006, and is "Mona" in the musical Survival Kit, written by Klaus Hagerup, Benedicte Adrian and Ingrid Bjørnov. The music was released on record Survival Kit (2006), and presented at Vossajazz 2007, with additional musicians Maria Kannegaard (electric piano), Jarle Bernhoft (vocals, guitar) and Andreas Tor Haugerud (drums).

== Discography ==
=== Solo albums ===
- 2001: Love Seriously Damages Health – (Bergland Prod.)
- 2006: Survival Kit – (Bergland Prod.), with Gunnar Andreas Berg

=== Collaborative works ===
Duo with Tord Gustavsen and "Aire & Angels»

- 1999: Aire & Angels – (C+C Records)
- 2002: Aire & Angels II – (Bergland Prod.), with Tord Gustavsen, presenting texts by Rubert Brooke

Duo within Trondheim Jazz Orchestra

- 2005: We Are? (Jazzaway), works by Eirik Hegdal
- 2008: Wood And Water (MNJ Records), 24 songs by Eirik Hegdal, with contributions by Gjære, Nils-Olav Johansen, Ståle Storløkken, Ole Morten Vågan and Tor Haugerud

With other projects

- 2002: Små Sanger Mest I Det Blå – (Bergland Prod.), with Eldbjørg Raknes and Stian Carstensen
- 2010: Improvoicing – (MNJ Records), with "Trondheim Voices"
- 2011: Patience for the Little Things (Reflect Records), with Sverre Gjørvad

=== Singles ===
- 1999: Someone's Working Late Tonight – (Bergland Prod.)
