= 2019 in Nordic music =

The following is a list of notable events and releases that happened in Nordic music in 2019.

== Events ==
=== January ===
- 3 January – Swedish organist Hans Fagius is a recipient of the Royal College of Organists medal for "distinguished achievement in organ playing".
- 10 January – The 18th All Ears festival opens in Oslo, Norway, running until 12 January.
- 25 January – The 32nd Nordlysfestivalen opens in Tromsø, running until 3 February. Performers include Dmitry Shishkin and Wenche Myhre.
- 31 January
  - The 8th Bodø Jazz Open Vinterjazz opens in Bodø, Norway, running until 2 February.
  - The 21st Polarjazz Festival opens in Longyearbyen, Svalbard, Norway, running until 3 February.

=== February ===
- 14 February – The annual Ice Music Festival opens in Finse, Norway, running until 16 February. Performers include Maria Skranes, Ivar Kolve and Snorre Bjerck.
- 23 February – At the 49th Dansk Melodi Grand Prix final, held at the Jyske Bank Boxen in Herning, Leonora emerges as overall winner with the song "Love Is Forever"; she thus becomes Denmark's representative in this year's Eurovision Song Contest.

=== March ===
- 6 March – The 50th Turku Jazz Festival opens in Turku, Finland, running until 10 March.
- 9 March
  - Melodifestivalen 2019 concludes at the Friends Arena in Stockholm, with John Lundvik emerging as overall winner with the song "Too Late for Love"; he thus becomes Sweden's representative in this year's Eurovision Song Contest.
  - The 6th Faroese Music Awards ceremony takes place at the Nordic House (Norðurlandahúsið), Tórshavn. Teitur Lassen wins Best Artist and Best Song.
- 22 March – The Blue House Youth Jazz Festival opens in Stockholm, Sweden, running until 24 March.
- 28 March – Icelandic band Sigur Rós are charged with tax evasion, covering the period 2011-2014.

=== April ===
- 4 April – Wisting, Norway's most expensive TV series to date, is launched, with music by Jacob Groth, Ole Bo, and Sören Möller.
- 12 April – The Finnish Radio Symphony Orchestra (FRSO) announces that Hannu Lintu's term as chief conductor will end with the 2020-2021 season.
- 30 April – The Seoul Philharmonic Orchestra announces that Finnish conductor Osmo Vänskä has signed a three-year contract to be its next musical director, beginning from January 2020.

=== May ===
- 2 May – The Finnish Radio Symphony Orchestra names Nicholas Collon as its next chief conductor, to replace Hannu Lintu; Collon will be the first non-Finnish conductor ever to be chief conductor of the FRSO.
- 9 May – Finnish National Opera and Ballet names Hannu Lintu as its next chief conductor; Lintu will hold the post from 1 January 2022 to 30 June 2026.
- 18 May – In the final of the Eurovision Song Contest 2019, Sweden finish in 5th place, Norway in 6th place, Iceland in 10th place and Denmark in 12th place. Finland did not reach the final. The UK entry, written by Sweden's John Lundvik, finishes in last place.
- 22 May – The UK's Philharmonia Orchestra names Finnish conductor Santtu-Matias Rouvali as its next principal conductor, as from the 2021-2022 season, with an initial contract of 5 years.

=== June ===
- 12 June
  - The Iceland Symphony Orchestra announces that Eva Ollikainen will be its next chief conductor and artistic advisor, the first female conductor ever to take on the role; her contract will be from the 2020-2021 season until 2024.
  - The Bergenfest music festival opens in Bergen, Norway, running until 15 June. The line-up includes Patti Smith and Robert Plant.
- 13 June – The Norwegian Wood music festival opens in Oslo, Norway, running until 15 June.

=== July ===
- 4 July
  - The 20th Folk music festival of Siglufjordur opens in Siglufjordur, Iceland, running until 8 July.
  - The 23rd Skånevik Bluesfestival opens in Skånevik, Norway, running until 6 July.
- 5 July
  - The Baltic Jazz Festival opens in Dalsbruk, Finland, running until 7 July.
  - The 41st Copenhagen Jazz Festival opens in Copenhagen, Denmark, running until 14 July.
- 6 July – The 20th Øyafestivalen opens in Oslo, Norway, running until 10 August.
- 8 July – The 33rd Sildajazz festival opens in Haugesund, Norway, running until 9 August.
- 11 July – The 34th Oslo Jazzfestival opens in Oslo, Norway, running until 17 August.

=== August ===
- 13 August – The Britten Synfonia premières a new version of the Enigma Variations in celebration of the 60th birthday of conductor Martyn Brabbins. Kalevi Aho is one of the contributing composers.

=== September ===
- 5 September – The 20th Sibelius Festival opens in Lahti, Finland, running until 8 September. Performers include Karita Mattila, Folke Gräsbeck, and the Royal Stockholm Philharmonic Orchestra.

=== October ===
- 3 October – The Norrköping Symphony Orchestra names Karl-Heinz Steffens as its next principal conductor and artistic advisor, beginning from the 2020-2021 season.
- 4 October – The Copenhagen Opera Festival names Amy Lane as its new festival director; she will be the first woman and the first non-Dane to hold the post.
- 18 October – Hildur Guðnadóttir wins the Best Television Composer award at the World Soundtrack Awards for her score for the HBO/Sky series Chernobyl.

=== December ===
- 15 December – Finnish band Children of Bodom play their last show before disbanding, at the Black Box venue in Helsinki.
- 25 December – Swedish musical film, En del av mitt hjärta, is released.

== Albums released ==
=== January ===
Day	Album	Artist	Label	Notes	Ref.
4	Iihtallan	Festerday		First full-length album	
11	Verkligheten	Soilwork	Nuclear Blast		
18	Last Call: Live in Helsinki	Remu & Hurriganes			
18	Covered in Blood	Arch Enemy		Compilation album	
25	Songs for the Dead Live	King Diamond		Live album & Blu-Ray DVD	

=== February ===
Day	Album	Artist	Label	Notes	Ref.
1	And Then Comes The Night	Mats Eilertsen, Harmen Fraanje, Thomas Strønen	ECM		
1	Lotus	Soen			
8	Dualistic	Dualistic (Bernt Moen, Fredrik Sahlander, Tobias Solbakk)	Losen		
8	Tana	Sverre Gjørvad	Losen		
8	Æ	Anton Eger	Edition	Produced by Petter Eldh and Anton Eger, Executive producer Dave Stapleton	
22	Quilter	Thomas T Dahl	Losen	Produced by Thomas T Dahl	
22	The Door to Doom	Candlemass		Featuring Tony Iommi	
22	Come Home	Rigmor Gustafsson	ACT		
22	Esoteric Oppression	The Moth Gatherer	Agonia Records		

=== March ===
Day	Album	Artist	Label	Notes	Ref.
1	Human	Darkwater			
1	Léon	Léon	Léon Recordings	Digital download only	
1	Sucker Punch	Sigrid	Island Records	Produced by Martin Sjølie	
1	Westkust	Westkust	Run for Cover Records	Vocalist Julia Bjernelind plays guitar alongside Brian Cukrowski, drummer Philip Söderlind and new bassist Pär Karlsson	
8	Wings of Fire	Brymir			
8	Beyond the Void	Iron Fire			
8	Hexed	Children of Bodom	Danger Johnny	Produced by Mikko Karmila	
8	Voyage	Daniel Herskedal	Edition	Produced by Daniel Herskedal, Executive producer Dave Stapleton	
15	Teipillä tai rakkaudella	Anna Abreu			
22	Sounds Of 3 Edition 2	Per Mathisen feat. Ulf Wakenius and Gary Husband	Losen		

=== April ===
Day	Artist	Album	Label	Notes	Ref.
12	Hamferð	Ódn (EP)			
19	Per Wiberg	Head Without Eye	Despotz Records	First solo album	
26	Arvingarna	I do	Columbia Records		
26	Helheim	Rignir	Dark Essence Records		
26	Månegarm	Fornaldarsagorna			
26	Promoe	The Art of Losing			

=== May ===
Day	Album	Artist	Label	Notes	Ref.
3	Ofidians Manifest	Kampfar	Indie Recordings		
10	Glory Chord	Bigbang	Grand Sport Records		
10	Dark Morph	Dark Morph		Collaboration between Jónsi and Carl Michael von Hausswolff	
10	Departure	Eyolf Dale	Edition Records	In collaboration with Andre Roligheten	
11	Drone Activity	Ulver			
17	The King Live in Paris	Avatar		Live album	
24	Northbound	Eivind Austad Trio	Losen		

=== June ===
Day	Album	Artist	Label	Notes	Ref.
7	Första klass	Einár	Self-released	Digital download; reached no 1 in Swedish charts	
7	One Fire	Combichrist			
12	& Co.	Daði Freyr	Samlist ehf		
14	Return to Eden	Timo Tolkki's Avalon	Frontiers Music		

=== July ===
Day	Album	Artist	Label	Notes	Ref.
5	Outstrider	Abbath	Season of Mist	Named one of the 50 best metal albums of 2019 by Loudwire	
5	Live	Bullet		Live album	
19	The Great War	Sabaton	Nuclear Blast	Produced by Jonas Kjellgren	
26	Recordead Live – Sextourcism in Z7	Lordi	AFM Records	First official Live DVD of the band	

=== August ===
Day	Album	Artist	Label	Notes	Ref.
2	Rewind, Replay, Rebound	Volbeat	Vertigo, Republic, Universal	First studio album with Kaspar Boye Larsen on bass	
16	Dominion	HammerFall			
30	In the Raw	Tarja Turunen	earMUSIC	featuring Björn "Speed" Strid, Tommy Karevik and Cristina Scabbia	

=== September ===
Day	Album	Artist	Label	Notes	Ref.
5	Nummer 1	Einár	Self-released	Digital download; reached no 1 in Swedish charts	
13	Rust	Crashdïet	Diet Records; Frontiers Music Srl	First full-length album with Gabriel Keyes as vocalist	

=== October ===
Day	Album	Artist	Label	Notes	Ref.
4	Heart Like a Grave	Insomnium	Century Media Records	Mixed by Jens Bogren	
18	Alpha and the Omega	Konkhra	Hammerheart Records		
25	Transition	Art Nation	Gain Music Entertainment	Third studio album	
25	Pitfalls	Leprous	InsideOutMusic		
25	Daemon	Mayhem	Century Media		

=== November ===
Day	Album	Artist	Label	Notes	Ref.
8	Songs the Night Sings	The Dark Element		Featuring Anette Olzon and Jani Liimatainen	
8	The Enemy: Reality	Wolfbrigade	Southern Lord		
15	Fairytale – Joulun taikaa	Saara Aalto	Warner Music	Formats: Digital download, CD	
15	Non Debellicata	Ragnarok			

=== December ===
Day	Album	Artist	Label	Notes	Ref.
3	9 Elu	Laura Põldvere	Oh! Joy productions		
6	Brave Tin World	The Murder of My Sweet	Frontiers Music		
6	Decades: Live in Buenos Aires	Nightwish	Nuclear Blast	Live album issued as Blu-ray digibook, 2CD digipak, Blu-ray+2CD earbook and 3LP	

== Classical works ==
- Hans Abrahamsen – Horn Concerto
- Daniel Bjarnason – From Space I Saw Earth
- Sebastian Fagerlund – Nomade
- Anders Hillborg – Sound Atlas
- Aulis Sallinen – Concerto for Two Accordions, Strings and Percussion
- Anna S. Þorvaldsdóttir – Enigma (String Quartet No 1)

== Film and television scores ==
- Ole Bo, Jacob Groth & Sören Möller – Wisting
- Mikkel Hess – Darkness: Those Who Kill
- Martin Horntveth – Twin

== Musical films ==
- En del av mitt hjärta, with music by Tomas Ledin, Björn Ulvaeus and Andreas Carlsson

== Eurovision Song Contest ==
- Denmark in the Eurovision Song Contest 2019
- Finland in the Eurovision Song Contest 2019
- Iceland in the Eurovision Song Contest 2019
- Norway in the Eurovision Song Contest 2019
- Sweden in the Eurovision Song Contest 2019

== Deaths ==
- 12 February - Olli Lindholm, 54, Finnish singer and guitarist (heart attack)
- 26 February - Magnus Lindberg, 66, Swedish musician, singer and composer (cancer)
- 20 March - Terje Nilsen, 67, Norwegian singer-songwriter.
- 26 March - Master Fatman, 53, Danish comedian, film director and singer
- 27 March - Audun Laading, 25, Norwegian musician, member of Her's (car crash)
- 5 May - Ib Glindemann, 84, Danish jazz composer and bandleader
- 19 May - Alfred Janson, 82, Norwegian composer and pianist
- 10 June
  - Ib Nørholm, 88, Danish composer and organist
  - Sven-David Sandström, 76, Swedish composer
- 5 July - Paolo Vinaccia, 65, Italian drummer long resident in Norway
- 6 July – Thommy Gustafsson, 71, keyboardist of Swedish band Sven-Ingvars
- 8 August - Erling Wicklund, 75, Norwegian jazz trombonist and journalist.
- 18 September – Tony Mills, 57UK-born vocalist for Norwegian band TNT (cancer)
- 2 October - Morten Stützer, Danish guitarist and former bassist of Artillery, 57
- 4 November - Timi Hansen, 61, Danish bassist (cancer)
- 5 November - Jan Erik Kongshaug, 75, Norwegian jazz musician and sound engineer
- 9 December - Marie Fredriksson, 61, Swedish singer-songwriter (Roxette)
