= Erlend Skomsvoll =

Norwegian jazz musician, band leader, and composer

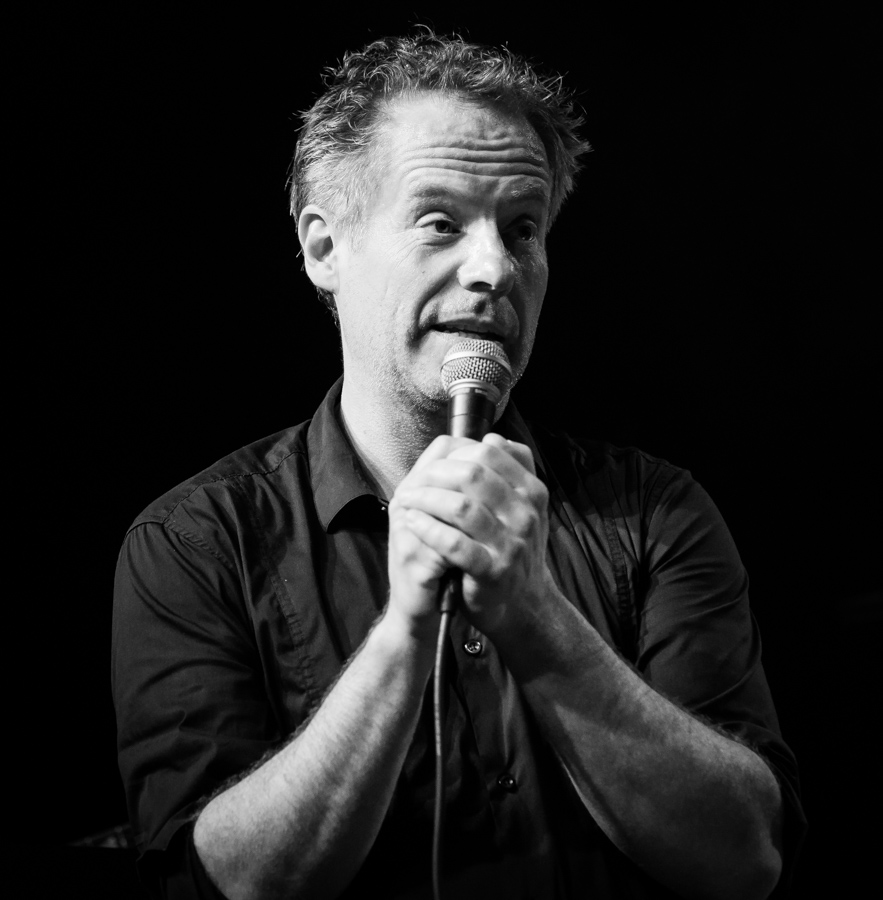
- Erlend Skomsvoll at the 2017 Kongsberg Jazzfestival.

Background information
- Born: Erlend Fredrik Skomsvoll; 12 May 1969 (age 57); Bærum, Akershus, Norway
- Genres: Jazz
- Occupations: Musician, composer, band leader, arranger
- Instruments: Piano, keyboards, accordion, tuba
- Website: home.online.no/~livero/skomsvoll.html

Erlend Fredrik Skomsvoll (born 12 May 1969) is a Norwegian jazz musician (piano, keyboards, accordion, and tuba), band leader, composer and arranger, known from his own band Skomsork and the band Wibutee with Live Maria Roggen, Madrugada, and Kaizers Orchestra. He has also cooperated with Nils Petter Molvær, Chick Corea and Pat Metheny.

== Career ==
Skomsvoll was born in Bærum. He was educated at Norges Musikkhøgskole in Oslo, and on the Jazz program at Trondheim Musikkonservatorium (1994–1998), where he contributed with Come Shine (1998–2003). In 2000 he got a trainee position at Midt-norsk jazzsenter from Norsk Kulturråd, and has thus served as a central performer, conductor and arranger for Trondheim Jazz Orchestra, which since 2000 has arranged music for concerts with Pat Metheny, New York Voices and Chick Corea.

Skomsvoll otherwise has collaborated with, among others Konsen Big Band, Marit Sandvik, Kirsti Huke, and Morten Abel. With Mark Adderley he developed the commissioned work for Oslo Filharmoniske Orkester (2004), and in 2005 he collaborated with Madrugada and Bodø Sinfonietta in a production for Nordland Musikkfestuke, as well as with Trondheim Musikkteater in the production «Spor». Skomsvoll was in 2003 awarded De unges Lindemanpris, voted by Christian Eggen, winner of the Lindeman Prize 2003.

He composes all the music to his own «Skomsvoll Orkester» (etablert 1996). Dette ble i 2004 videreført i «Skomsork», bestående av Eirik Hegdal (altsax), Thomas T. Dahl (guitar), Ole Marius Sandberg (bass) og Thomas Strønen (drums and elektronics). The band was nominated for Spellemannprisen for the album Skomsork. In 2008 he led the quartet Skoms with Ola Kvernberg (fiolin), Ole Morten Vågan (bass) and Børge Fjordheim (slagverk) the release of the CD and DVD.

== Honors ==
- 2001: The Norwegian candidate for the newly established European Jazz Prize
- 2002: Spellemannprisen in the category Jazz for the album Do do that voodoo (2002), with Come Shine
- 2014: Buddyprisen awarded by the Norwegian Jazz Federation
- 2014: Spellemannprisen in the category Classical music, for the album Holberg Variations (2014)

== Discography ==
=== Solo albums ===
With Skomsork

- 2004: Skomsork (Park Grammofon)

Other projects

- 2006: Variasjoner (Grappa Music), commissioned work for Vossajazz 2002
- 2008: 52:29 (Grappa Music), with Skoms (Attached was found Monstermort, DVD 2008)
- 2009: What If? A Counterfactual Fairytale (MNJ Records), with Trondheim Jazz Orchestra, compositions by Skomsvoll
- 2014: Holberg Variations (Grappa Music), with Christian Ihle Hadland and 1B1
- 2017: Louder Than You (Øra Fonogram), with 'Molecules'

=== Collaborations ===
Within Wibutee

- 1997: Newborn thing (Jazzland)
- 1999: Blå, Molde (Curling Legs), the track "Dans"

Within Come Shine

- 2000: Come Shine (Curling Legs)
- 2002: Do do that voodoo (Curling Legs), awarded Spellemannprisen
- 2003: In concert (Curling Legs), with Kringkastingsorkesteret at Kongsberg Jazz Festival 2003
- 2014: Red And Gold (Jazzland)

Awards
| Preceded by Jan Gunnar Hoff | Recipient of the Buddyprisen; 2014 | Succeeded by Håkon Kornstad |
