= Olavi Louhivuori =

Finnish jazz drummer and composer (born 1981)

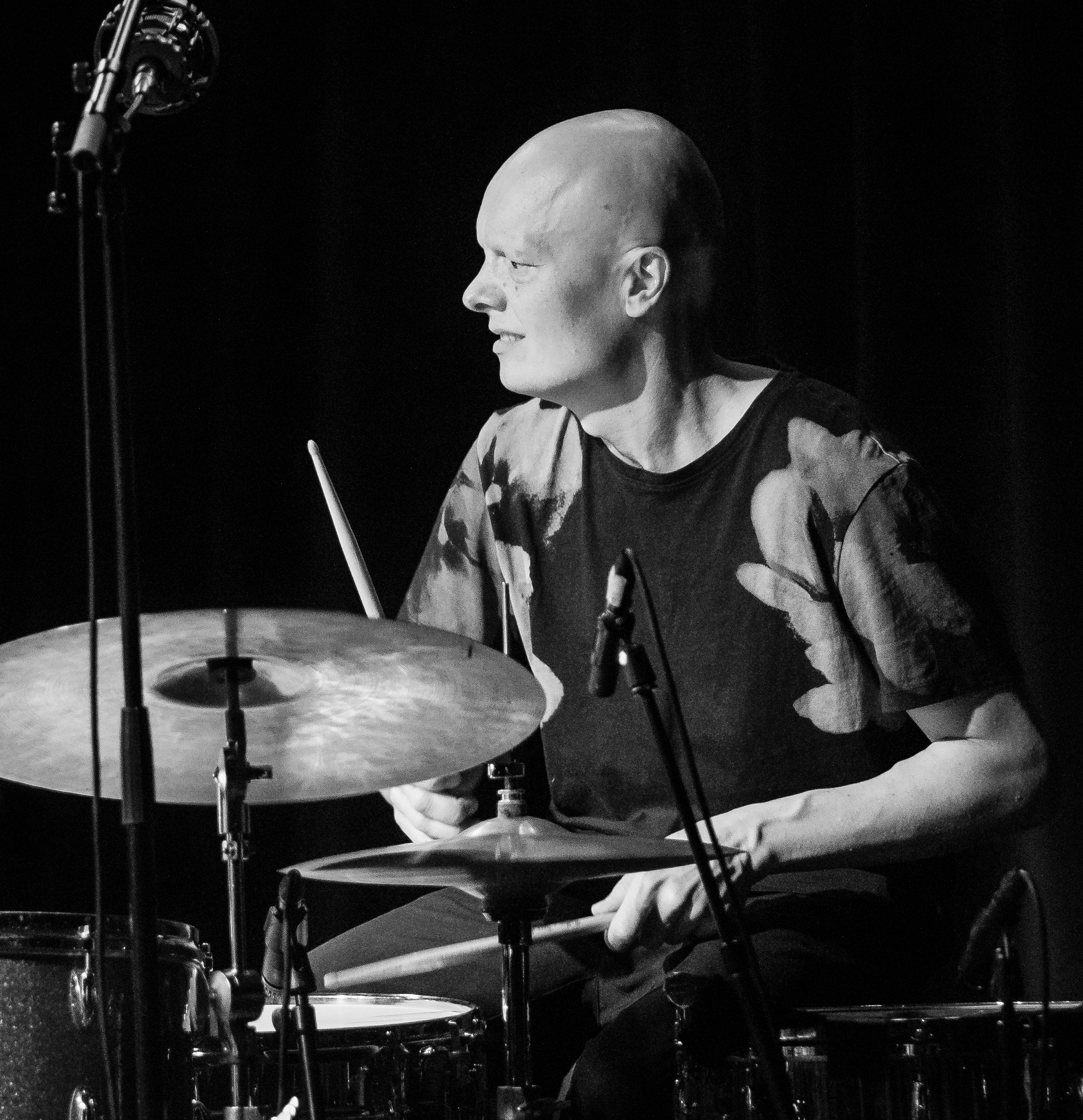
- Louhivuori performing with Linda Fredriksson at Victoria Teater, Oslo 2023; Photo: Tore Sætre

Background information
- Born: 13 July 1981 (age 45); Jyväskylä, Finland
- Origin: Finland
- Genres: Jazz
- Occupations: Musician, composer
- Instrument: Drums
- Website: www.olavilouhivuori.com

Olavi Louhivuori (born 13 July 1981 in Jyväskylä, Finland) is a Finnish jazz drummer and composer, the leader of his own ensemble Oddarrang, and also performer within several other bands. He is married to the singer Emma Salokoski.

== Career ==
Louhivuori was raised in a musical family. His father Jukka Louhivuori is professor at the Department of Music University of Jyväskylä and his mother, a violinist and music educator. Each of the five children in his family was taught to play instruments. Louhivuori started to play violin at four, and changed to cello and piano when eight. When he was nine years of age he changed to drums and founded his first band together with classmate Joona Toivanen.

While at Cygnaeus high school (1997), he played with the Joona Toivanen Trio, as well as joining gigs at local jam sessions. In 1998 he attended the jazz program at Finnish Music Conservatory, graduating in 2002, and then moved to Helsinki, and joined the Sibelius Academy to study jazz with Jukkis Uotila. In 2005–06, he studied composition under the guidance of Sonny Heinilä.

Louhivuori has also composed two works for the Jyväskylä Big Band.

== Bands ==
While a student at the Sibelius Academy, he met pianist Tuomo Prättälä, bassist Antti Lötjönen and trumpeter Verneri Pohjola, with whom he in 2002 founded the band Ilmiliekki Quartet. In 2003 their debut album March of the Alpha Males appeared, followed in 2006 by Take It With Me.

Louhivuori founded the Finnish experimental jazz ensemble Oddarrang in 2003. The band includes trombonist Ilmari Pohjola, cellist Osmo Ikonen, guitarist Lasse Sakara, as well as bassist Lasse Lindgren. Oddarrang's debut album Music Illustrated (2006), was awarded the Jazz-Emma award in 2006.

In 2008 he released his first solo album, Inhale Exhale, on Texicalli Records. This is a solo percussion album, where Louhivuori demonstrates his broad abilities.

Louhivuori also plays in the bands Ilmiliekki Quartet, Alexi Tuomarila Trio, Joona Toivanen, Olavi Trio and Sun Trio. He has three times been involved in winning the Nordic Jazz Comets competitions in: Joona Toivanen trio in 2000, Ilmiliekki Quartet in 2002, and Sun Trio in 2006. In addition, he has played with, among others, UMO Jazz Orchestra Tomasz Stanko, Jon Balke, Marilyn Crispell, Teppo Hauta-aho, Jukka Perko, Sakari Kukko and M. A. Numminen.

== Selected discography ==
=== Solo albums ===
- 2008: Inhale Exhale (Texicalli Records)
- 2014: Existence! (Eclipse Music)

With Oddarrang

- 2006: Music Illustrated (Texicalli Records)
- 2012: Cathedral (Texicalli Records)
- 2013: In Cinema (Edition Records)
- 2016: Agartha (Edition Records)
- 2019: Hypermetros (Edition Records)

With Olavi Trio & Friends

- 2012: Triologia (TUM Records)

=== Collaborations ===
With Joona Toivanen Trio

- 2000: Numurkah (JTT Records)
- 2002: Enchantment (JTT Records)
- 2006: Frost (Blue Note)

With Ilmiliekki Quartet

- 2003: March of the Alpha Males (TUM Records)
- 2006: Take It With Me (TUM Records)

With Ilmiliekki Quartet (Tuomo Prättälä, Antti Lötjönen, Verneri Pohjola)

- 2003: March of the Alpha Males (TUM Records)
- 2006: Take It With Me (TUM Records)
- 2009: Vi Sålde Våra Hemman (KHY Suomen Musiikki Oy), with Emma Salokoski

Alexi Tuomarila Trio (Mats Eilertsen)

- 2006: Constellation (Jazzaway)
- 2013: Seven Hills (Edition Records)
- 2017: Kingdom (Edition Records))

With Piirpauke

- 2006: Kalabalik

With Tomasz Stanko Quintet

- 2009: Dark Eyes (ECM)

With Mats Eilertsen

- 2009: Radio Yonder (Hubro), including with Tore Brunborg and Thomas T. Dahl
- 2016: Rubicon (ECM), with Eirik Hegdal, Thomas T Dahl, Trygve Seim, and Harmen Fraanje (commission for the 2014 Vossajazz)

With Mark O'Leary

- 2012: Astral Fishing Extended Edition (TIB Production Italy), including with Teppa Hauta-aho

With Yelena Eckemoff

- 2017: Blooming Tall Phlox (L&H Production)
- 2021: Adventures of the Wildflower (L&H Production)
