= Ole Morten Vågan =

Norwegian jazz musician and composer (born 1979)

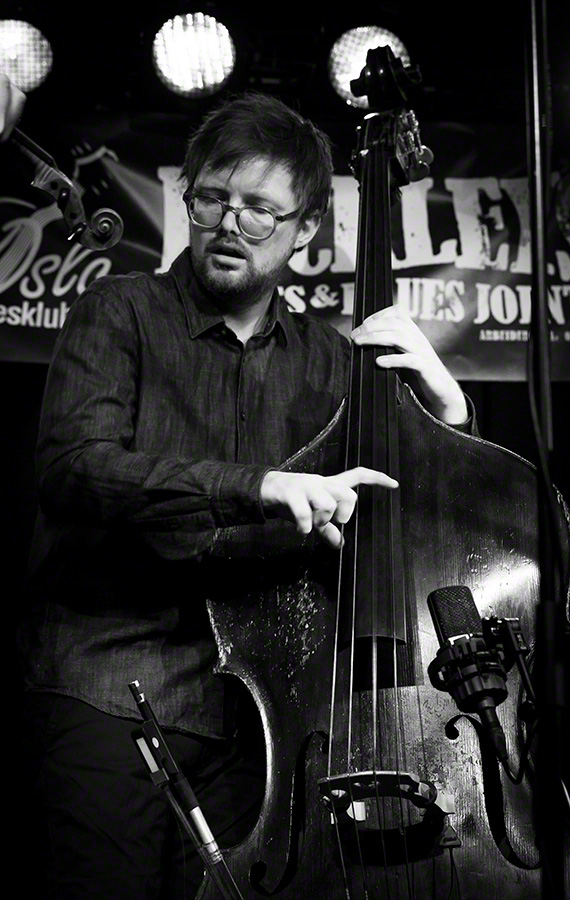
- Vågan at Buckleys during the 2016 Oslo Jazzfestival.

Background information
- Born: 8 May 1979 (age 47); Brønnøysund, Norway
- Genres: Jazz
- Occupations: Musician, composer
- Instrument: Upright bass
- Labels: Jazzland, AIM Records, MNJ Records
- Website: olemortenvagan.com

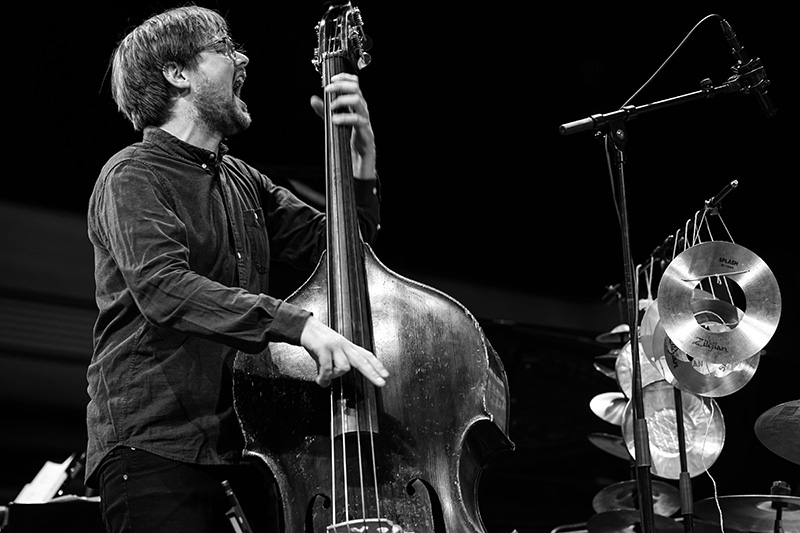
Ole Morten Vågan, at Reykjavik Jazz Festival performing with Trondhjem Jazz Orchestra (2017)

Ole Morten Vågan (born 8 May 1979) is a Norwegian jazz musician and composer (upright bass), and the older brother of guitarist Petter Vågan. He is known from several recordings and is currently acting as artistic director for the Trondheim Jazz Orchestra. Vågan is also known from cooperating with some of the most influential musicians and composers internationally and has released eight albums as a leader, recently with the TJO (Happy Endlings, Odin records 2018), as well as six albums with his group Motif and one with the group The Deciders.

== Career ==
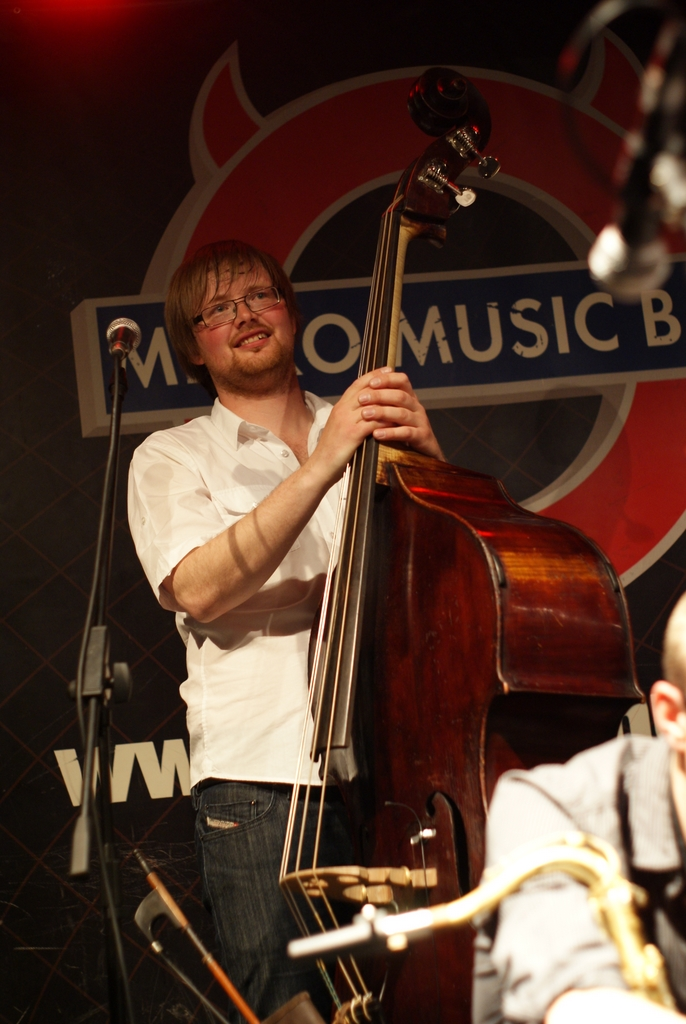
Vågan in 2010 at the Jazz Fest Brno.

Vågan was born in Brønnøysund. He began his career as a jazz musician in the Nord-Norsk Ungdomstorband at the end of the 1990s and launched his own project "Ole Morten Vågan Projekt" on tour for Nordnorsk Jazzforum in 1999. This was also documented with a concert for radio on NRK P2, Jazzklubben, hosted by Erling Wicklund recorded at Nordland Musikkfestuke. He was a graduate of the Jazz program at Trondheim Musikkonservatorium (1998–2002).

In 1999 he formed the quintet Motif, together with Atle Nymo (tenor saxophone), Mathias Eick (trumpet), David Thor Jonsson (piano) and Håkon Mjåset Johansen (drums), where he composes the main part of the repertoire himself. In 2000 Vågan lead the band Motif at Moldejazz and was awarded "NOPA's Composer Prize" the same year, as well as "Young Nordic Jazzcomets" the year after, at Copenhagen Jazz Festival.

As both a bassist and composer, he has worked at the intersection of improvised and notated music, and in 2011 published his seventh disc with the aforementioned MOTIF, to critical acclaim. In 2009 he wrote an hour's music to a tentett, which besides Motif's permanent members, included Mathias Eick, Mattias Ståhl, Ola Kvernberg, Håkon Kornstad, and Petter Vågan. Vågan received the DnB NOR award at Kongsberg Jazzfestival i 2009, and came back the following year with new music, this time for a band consisting of influential musicians from the European improvisational scenes: Axel Dörner and Rudi Mahall (DE), as well as Fredrik Ljungkvist and Jon Fält (SE).

== Honors ==
- 2009: Kongsberg Jazz Award

== Discography ==
With Motif

- 2004: Motif (AIM Records)
- 2005: Expansion (AIM Records)
- 2008: Apo Calypso (Jazzland Recordings)
- 2010: Facienda (Jazzland Records)
- 2011: Art Transplant (Clean Feed Records), with Axel Dörner
- 2016: My Head Is Listening (Clean Feed Records)

With Tore Johansen

- 2001: Happy Days (Gemini Records)
- 2002: Windows (Gemini Records)
- 2005: Like That (Gemini Records)
- 2007: Rainbow Session (Inner Ear)

With Klaus Ellerhusen Holm

- 2004: Two Way Street (Jazzaway Records)
- 2006: What Was That You Said? (Jazzaway Records), as Klaus Holm Kollektif

With Maria Kannegaard Trio

- 2005: Quiet Joy (Jazzland Records)
- 2007: Live in Oslo (MNJ Records), with Trondheim Jazz Orchestra
- 2008: Camel walk (Jazzland Records)

With Trondheim Jazz Orchestra feat. Eirik Hegdal

- 2005: We Are? (Jazzaway Records)
- 2008: Wood And Water (MNJ Records)
- 2009: What if? (MNJ Records)

With Jonas Kullhammar

- 2005: Andratx (Moserobie Music Production)
- 2009: Andratx Live (Moserobie Music Production)

With 'Juxtaposed'

- 2010: Tsar Bomba (Bolage Records)

With Gammalgrass

- 2013: Obsolete Music 1 (Division Records)

With The Deciders

- 2013: We Travel The Airwaves (Jazzland Recordings)

With Obara International

- 2013: Komeda (For Tune)
- 2013: Live At Manggha (For Tune)
- 2015: Live In Mińsk Mazowiecki (For Tune)

With Thomas Strønen

- 2015: Time Is A Blind Guide (ECM Records)
- 2018: Lucus (ECM Records)

With Snik

- 2015: Metasediment Rock (Clean Feed Records)

With Team Hegdal

- 2015: Vol 3 (Particular Recordings)
- 2017: Vol 4 (Particular Recordings)

With Maciej Obara Quartet

- 2017: Unloved (ECM Records)
- 2019: Three Crowns (ECM Records)
- 2023: Frozen Silence (ECM Records)

With others

- 2004: Please don't shoot (Moserobie Music), with the band 'Brat' (Eirik Hegdal)
- 2005: First Communion (Jazzaway Records), with Anders Aarum Trio
- 2005: Christmas Songs (Jazzavdelingen), with Nora Brockstedt
- 2005: Two Way Street (Jazzaway Records), with Roundtrip
- 2007: The Arcades Project (Jazzland Recordings/Universal Music Norway), with Håvard Wiik Trio
- 2007: Subaquatic Disco (AIM Records), with The Espen Reinertsen Organic Jukebox
- 2008: 52 : 29 (Grappa Music), with Erlend Skomsvoll (CD/DWD)
- 2008: New Conceptions of Jazz Box (Jazzland Recordings), with Bugge Wesseltoft (3xCD)
- 2008: Maryland – Live! (Moserobie Music), with Maryland (9) (Maria Kannegaard)
- 2008: Lucid Grey (Dravle Records), with Tore Brunborg
- 2008: A Festa Vale Tudo (Parallell Records), with Erik Nylanders Orkester
- 2009: Assim Falava Jazzatustra (Clean Feed), with Júlio Resende
- 2011: Liarbird (2011), with Ola Kvernberg
- 2011: You Taste Like A Song (Clean Feed), with Júlio Resende Trio

Awards
Preceded by Helge Lien	Recipient of the Kongsberg Jazz Award; 2009	Succeeded by Maria Kannegaard
