= Dingobats =

Norwegian jazz band

- Origin: Trondheim, Norway
- Genres: Jazz
- Years active: 1995–present
- Labels: Jazzaway
- Members: Eirik Hegdal; Njål Ølnes; Thomas Dahl; Mats Eilertsen; Sverre Gjørvad

Dingobats (established in 1995) is a Norwegian Jazz band, composed of students from Jazz program at Trondheim Musikkonsevatorium. The band leader, saxophonist, composer and music arranger Eirik Hegdal, is also known for his cooperation with Trondheim Jazz Orchestra performing with Pat Metheny and Chick Corea.

== Biography ==
Dingobats is very much part of the new wave of jazz that has come out of Norway the past decade. Its founder and main composer, Erik Hegdal, is an important figure at the Norwegian jazz scene. Doing big band arrangements of their music at Moldejazz and "Vossajazz" in 1996, and at "Vossajazz" in 1996 released on the album The New Dingobats Generation (1998), followed by performances at "SoddJazz" 1998, "Dølajazz" and "Kibneb" in 1999, and returning to "Vossajazz" in 2001. This was summarized on the album Pöck (2002), featuring Live Maria Roggen vocals, Fredrik Ljungkvist clarinet, Fredrik Lundin saxophone and Øyvind Brække trombone (2002), giving them a mature return to Moldejazz 2002 and 2003, and a third album Follow (2004). Dingobats has been touring in Baltikum 1997, Northern Norway 1998, Scandinavia 2002, and has received ensemble support from Norsk Kulturråd (2000–02).

== Band members ==
- Eirik Hegdal - alto, soprano, baritone saxophones
- Njål Ølnes - tenor saxophone
- Thomas Dahl - guitar
- Mats Eilertsen - double bass
- Sverre Gjørvad - drums

== Discography ==
- 1998: The New Dingobats Generation (Turn Left Prod)
- 2002: Pöck (Bergland Productions), which feat. Live Maria Roggen (vocals)
- 2004: Follow (Jazzaway)
