= Trondheim Jazz Orchestra =

Norwegian jazz orchestral project

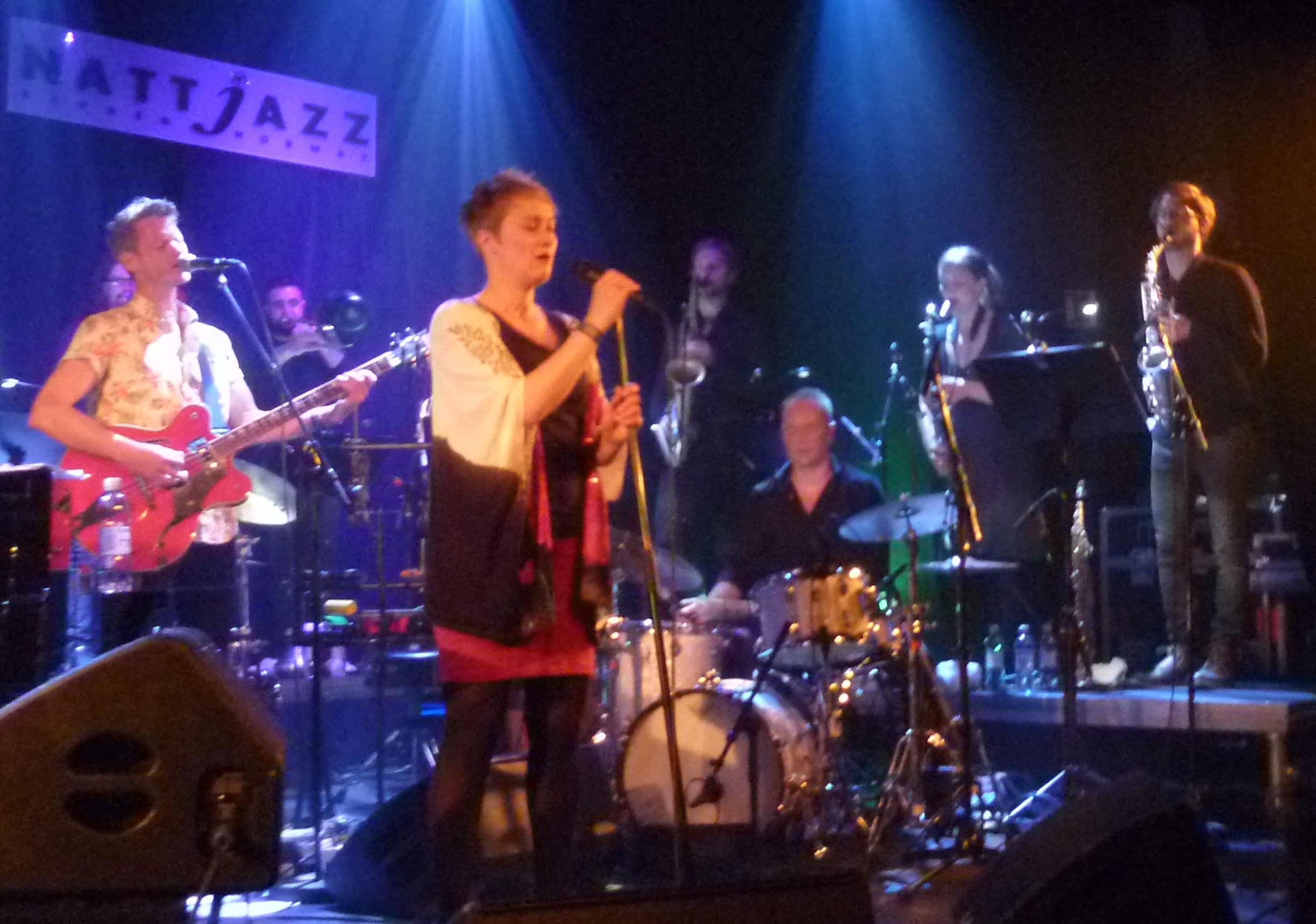
- Come Shine and TJO at the 2016 Nattjazz.

Background information
- Origin: Trondheim, Norway
- Genres: Jazz; Big band
- Years active: 1999–present
- Labels: Rune Grammofon; Jazzaway; MNJ Records
- Members: Anders Tveit, Anita Kaasbøll; Atle Nymo, Øivind Brække; Øyvind Brandtsegg, Øyvind Engen; Bjørn Ole Solberg; Bjørnar Habbestad; Christian Jaksjø; Christian Wallumrød; Clare Cooper, Eirik Hegdal; Eivind Lønning, Erik Eilertsen; Erik Johannessen, Erlend Skomsvoll; Espen Reinertsen, Frøy Aagre; Fredrik Sjølin, Frode Nymo; Hanne Rekdal; Hans Christian Frønes; Hayden Powell; Håkon Mjåset Johansen; Håvard Lund, Karin Hammar; Hedvig Mollestad Thomassen; Heidi Skjerve, Helge Norbakken; Hild Sofie Tafjord; Hildegunn Øiseth, Ingar Zach; Jørgen Mathisen, Jim Denley; Johan Hörlén, John Pål Inderberg; Jon Fält, Kari Rønnekleiv, Kim Myhr, Kjetil Møster; Klaus Ellerhusen Holm; Lene Grenager; Marianne Baudouin Lie; Martin Taxt, Mathias Eick; Mats Äleklint, Mats Eilertsen; Michael Francis Duch, Nils Jansen; Nils-Olav Johansen, Njål Ølnes; Ola Kvernberg, Ole Morten Vågan; Per Oddvar Johansen, Per Zanussi; Petter Kateraas, Petter Vågan; Sidsel Endresen, Siri Gjære; Sissel Vera Petterson; Ståle Storløkken; Steinar Raknes, Terje Isungset; Thomas Strønen, Tor Haugerud; Tor Yttredal, Tore Brunborg; Tore Johansen, Trude Eick
- Website: www.trondheimjazzorchestra.no

Trondheim Jazz Orchestra (TJO) (established 1999 in Trondheim, Norway) is an orchestral project based in Trondheim, and closely related to both the Midtnorsk Jazzsenter (MNJ - Mid Norwegian Jazz Center) and Jazz Line at the Trøndelag Conservatory of Music (NTNU).

== Biography ==
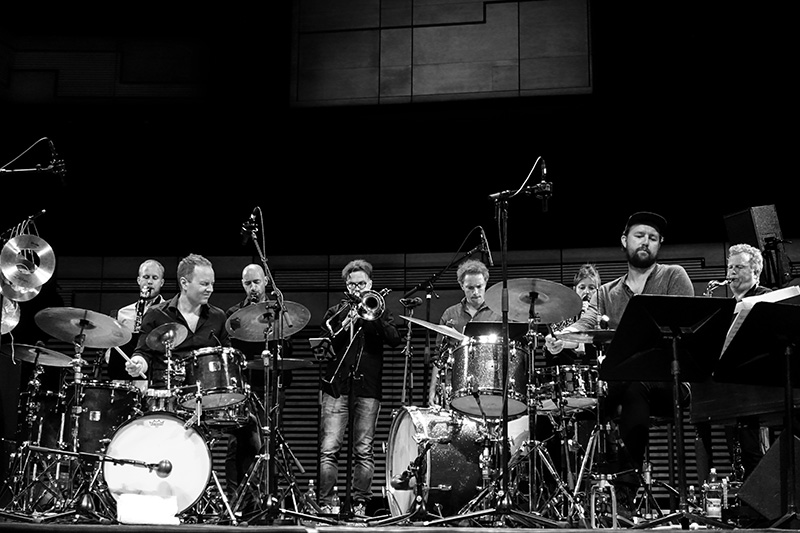
Trondheim Jazz Orchestra Reykjavik Jazz Festival 2017

During the 1990s the orchestra was a plain conservatory-band (Konsen Big Band). In 2000 the name of the band was changed to TJO. An important feature with Trondheim Jazz Orchestra is the band's flexible and varying size crew. The orchestra works on a project basis and performs mainly commissioned works of selected composers.

TJO has collaborated with Norwegian composers such as Erlend Skomsvoll, Eirik Hegdal, Vigleik Storaas, Jon Balke, Knut Kristiansen, Geir Lysne, Terje Rypdal and Bendik Hofseth, as well as with international soloists such as Chick Corea, Pat Metheny, New York Voices, Birger Sulsbruck and Joshua Redman.

In 2001 TJO toured Norway extensively with Chick Corea, a cooperation based on the concert at Moldejazz 2000. The collaboration resulted in a CD-release (Live in Molde), which has sold more than 8000 copies in Norway. The collaboration with Chick Corea was resumed in 2006 with a concert at the Hilton Ballroom in New York City during the Annual Jazz Conference (IAJE) in January of that year. This concert was a huge success, and as a result the orchestra was invited to the Tokyo Jazz Festival 2006. The cooperation between TJO and Chick Corea was successful once again and well received by a huge group of spectators while also being televised nationally. John Kelman, All About Jazz, states: "... a far reaching orchestra clearly capable of handling anything and everything that's put in front of it".

In 2003 the orchestra went on tour in Norway with Pat Metheny. This edition of TJO included musicians such as Live Maria Roggen, Ola Kvernberg and Steinar Nickelsen. On Moldejazz 2006 TJO did a project with music by Eirik Hegdal featuring Joshua Redman as a soloist, followed by a tour in the late fall of 2008. During Trondheim Chamber Music Festival TJO gave their first performance of commissioned work by saxophonist Bendik Hofseth. In 2007 Trondheim Jazz Orchestra were chosen to be the first national «Big Jazz Ensemble» to receive a permanent state subsidy. In 2012 TJO performed at the "Ultima Festival" in Oslo, Norway, performing a new work by Kim Myhr that, in addition to the guitarist, also featured singer Jenny Hval.

== Honors ==
- 2014: Spellemannprisen in the category Jazz, with Marius Neset for the album Lion

== Discography ==
- 2005: Live in Molde with Chick Corea (MNJ Records) – live recorded at Moldejazz 2000
- 2005: We Are? with Eirik Hegdal (Jazzaway) – recorded in 2004. featuring vocalist Siri Gjære.
- 2006: Tribute with Vigleik Storaas (MNJ Records) – live recorded in 2004 from 25 years anniversary for the Jazz Line at (NTNU)
- 2007: Live in Oslo with Maria Kannegaard Trio (MNJ Records) – from the Cosmopolite jazz scene in Oslo. music arranged by Eirik Hegdal.
- 2008: Wood And Water (MNJ Records) – 24 songs by Eirik Hegdal, with contributions by hired Siri Gjære, Nils-Olav Johansen, Ståle Storløkken, Ole Morten Vågan and Tor Haugerud
- 2008: Trondheim Jazz Orchestra & Kobert (Kobert Self-Released) – studio Version of the commissioned work to Moldejazz 2008
- 2009: What If? A counterfactual fairytale (MNJ Records) – feat. Erlend Skomsvoll
- 2010: Stems and Cages (MNJ Records) – Kim Myhr's commissioned work to Moldejazz 2009, with contributions by among others Sidsel Endresen, Christian Wallumrød and Ingar Zach
- 2010: Triads and More (MNJ Records) – feat. Eirik Hegdal & Joshua Redman
- 2011: Morning Songs (MNJ Records) – under the direction of composer and bass player Per Zanussi
- 2011: Kinetic Music (MNJ Records) – feat. Magic Pocket
- 2011: Migrations (MNJ Records) – feat. Øyvind Brække
- 2012: The Death Defying Unicorn (Rune Grammofon) – feat. Motorpsycho and Supersilent keyboardist Ståle Storløkken
- 2013: Sidewalk Comedy (MNJ Records) – feat. Eirik Hegdal
- 2014: Ekko (MNJ Records) – feat. Elin Rosseland
- 2014: Lion (ACT Music) – under the direction of Marius Neset
- 2015: Savages (MNJ Records) – feat. Kristoffer Lo
- 2016: In the End His Voice Will Be the Sound of Paper with Kim Myhr & Jenny Hval (Hubro)

Awards
Preceded by Karin Krog and John Surman	Recipient of the Jazz Spellemannprisen; 2014	Succeeded by Team Hegdal
