= Øyvind Skarbø =

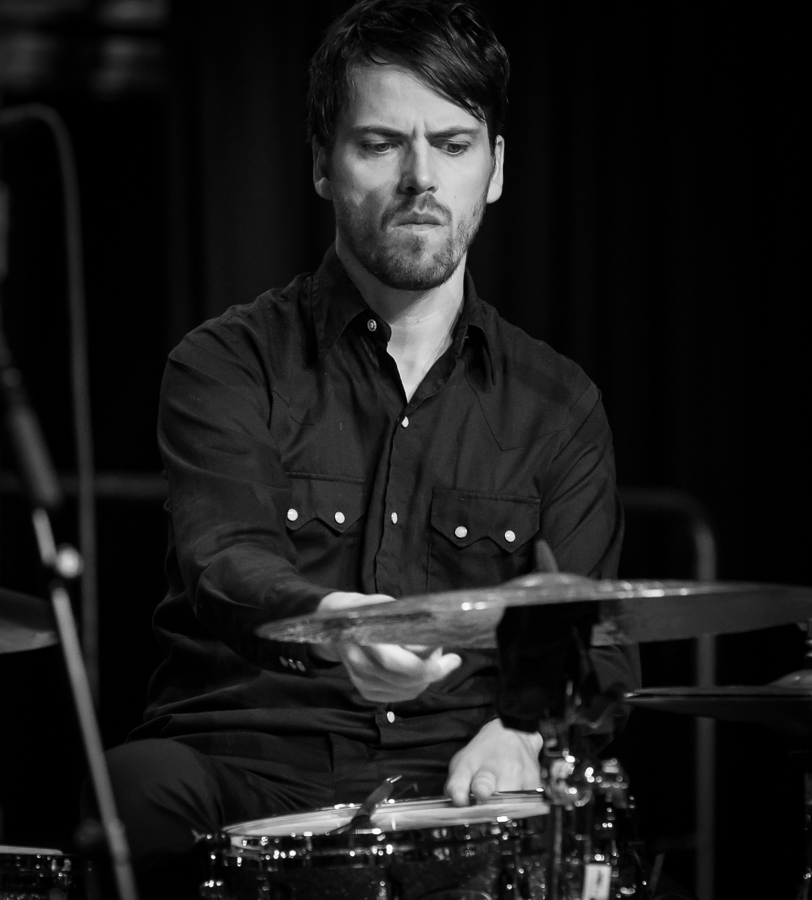
- Skarbø at the 2016 Oslo Jazzfestival.

Background information
- Born: 9 April 1982 (age 43); Stranda Municipality, Sunnmøre
- Origin: Norway
- Genres: Jazz
- Occupations: Musician, composer
- Instrument: Drums
- Website: www.oyvindskarbo.com

Øyvind Skarbø (born 9 April 1982 in Norway) is a Norwegian drummer and composer, raised in Stranda Municipality, and now residing in Bergen Municipality.

== Biography ==
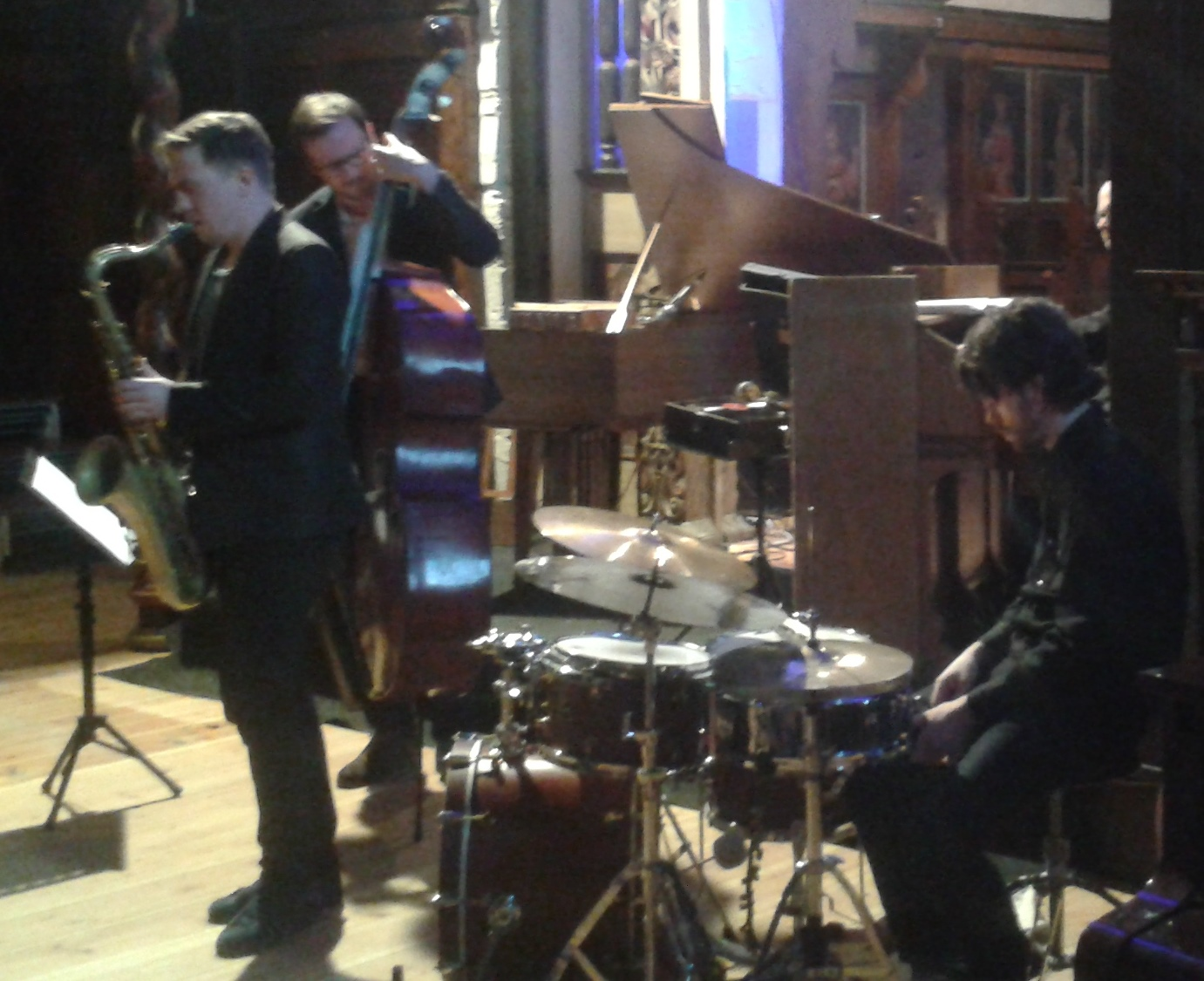
Skarbø with Håkon Kornstad's Tenor Battle at Vossajazz 2016.

Skarbø studied under the guidance of Terje Isungset at Griegakademiet, and has also carried out studies in Norwegian, Cuban and Nigerian traditional music. He is a driving force on the Norwegian improvisation music scene, both as a member and organizer of a number of bands. His main project '1982' and 'Bly de Blyant' are albums released on the Norwegian label Hubro. He has received great recognition in the international press in addition to the 2016 Vossajazz Award. Skarbø has directed 'Øyvind Jazzforum', a concert series of improvised music, since 2006.

== Honors ==
- 2016: The Vossajazz Award

== Discography ==
=== Solo albums ===
- 2011: Die, Allround Handwerker! (+3 dB SUB)

=== Collaborations ===
With 'Klangkameratane', including Even Helte Hermansen and Øyvind Hegg-Lunde

- 2007: Klangkameratane (Øyvind Jazzforum)

With '1982', including Sigbjørn Apeland and Nils Økland

- 2009: 1982 (NorCD)
- 2011: Pintura (Hubro)
- 2012: 1982 + BJ Cole (Hubro)
- 2014: A/B (Hubro)

With 'Stian Around A Hill', including Ola Høyer, Stian Omenås and Svein Magnus Furu

- 2009: Lille Stille (AIM Sound City)
- 2011: Alle Skal Få (Atterklang)

With 'BMX', including Njål Ølnes, Per Jørgensen and Thomas T. Dahl

- 2010: Bergen Open (NorCD)
- 2014: Rozel Point (Øyvind Jazzforum)

With 'Bly de Blyant', including Hilmar Jensson and Shahzad Ismaily

- 2013: ABC (Hubro)
- 2014: Hindsight Bias (Hubro)
- 2015: The Third Bly De Blyant Album (Hubro)

With 'Honeyleap', including Fredrik Ljungkvist, Klas Nevrin and Per Zanussi

- 2013: Honeyleap (Øyvind Jazzforum)

With 'Crab Is Crap', including Øyvind Hegg-Lunde

- 2015: Miradouro (Playdate Records), featuring Ståle Storløkken

With Håkon Kornstad

- 2015: Tenor Battle (Jazzland Recordings)
