= Yelena Eckemoff =

Russian-American composer and musician

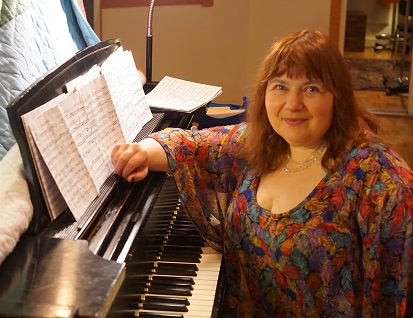

Background information
- Born: Moscow, Russia
- Genres: Classical; Jazz
- Occupations: Musician, composer, label founder, producer, educator
- Instrument: Piano
- Years active: 1991–present
- Labels: L&H Production
- Website: www.yelenamusic.com

Yelena Eckemoff is a Russian-born pianist, composer, poet, and visual artist. Her compositions blend classical music with jazz, and feature exploration and improvisation.

== Music career ==
Eckemoff was born in Moscow, Russia, in the Soviet Union. Her mother was a professional pianist and teacher. When Eckemoff was four, she started to play piano by ear and took lessons from her mother. At seven, she attended Gnessin State Musical College, a school for gifted children. She studied classical piano at Moscow State Conservatory. After graduating, she taught piano in Moscow. She gave solo concerts, took jazz classes, composed music for several instruments, and played in a jazz-rock band.

In her late 20th, she moved to the U.S. She has recorded in several genres: classical, vocal, folk, Christian, and jazz. Although jazz is typically associated with improvisation, Eckemoff often writes elaborate scores for her songs. Her music has been described as classical chamber music in the context of improvisational jazz.

== Jazz Discography ==
- Cold Sun (L&H, 2010) with Mads Vinding and Peter Erskine
- Grass Catching the Wind (L&H, 2010) with Mads Vinding and Morten Lund
- Flying Steps (L&H, 2010) with Darek Oles and Peter Erskine
- Forget-Me-Not (L&H, 2011) with Mats Eilertsen and Marilyn Mazur
- Glass Song (L&H, 2013) with Arild Andersen and Peter Erskine
- A Touch of Radiance (L&H, 2014) with Mark Turner, Joe Locke, George Mraz and Billy Hart
- Lions (L&H, 2014) with Arild Andersen and Billy Hart
- Everblue (L&H, 2015) with Tore Brunborg, Arild Andersen and Jon Christensen
- Leaving Everything Behind (L&H, 2016) with Mark Feldman, Ben Street and Billy Hart
- Blooming Tall Phlox (L&H, 2017) with Verneri Pohjola, Panu Savolainen, Antti Lotjonen and Olavi Louhivuori
- In the Shadow of a Cloud (L&H, 2017) with Chris Potter, Adam Rogers, Drew Gress and Gerald Cleaver
- Desert (L&H, 2018) with Paul McCandless, Arils Andersen and Peter Erskine
- Better Than Gold and Silver (L&H, 2018) with Ralph Alessi, Ben Monder, Christian Howes, Drew Gress and Joey Baron
- Colors (L&H, 2019) with Manu Katche
- Nocturnal Animals (L&H, 2020) with Arild Andersen, Jon Christensen and Thomas Stronen
- Adventures of the Wildflower (L&H, 2021) with Jukka Perko, Jarmo Saari, Panu Savolainen, Antti Lotjonen and Olavi Louhivuori
- I Am a Stranger in This World (L&H, 2022) with Ralph Alessi, Adam Rogers, Drew Gress and Nasheet Waits
- Lonely Man and His Fish (L&H, 2023) with Kirk Knuffke, Masaru Koga, Ben Street and Eric Harland
- Romance of the Moon (L&H, 2024) with Paolo Fresu, Riccardo Bertuzzi, Luca Bulgarelli and Stefano Bagnoli
- Scenes from the Dark Ages (L&H, 2025) with Carlo Nicita, Riccardo Bertuzzi, Eloisa Manera, Riccardo Oliva and Trilok Gurtu
- Rosendals Garden (L&H, 2026) with Svante Henryson and Morgan Ågren
- Bird Island (L&H, 2027) with Riccardo Bertuzzi, Carlo Nicita, Faso (Nicola Fasani) and Manu Katche
