= Maria Kannegaard =

Danish-born Norwegian jazz musician (born 1970)

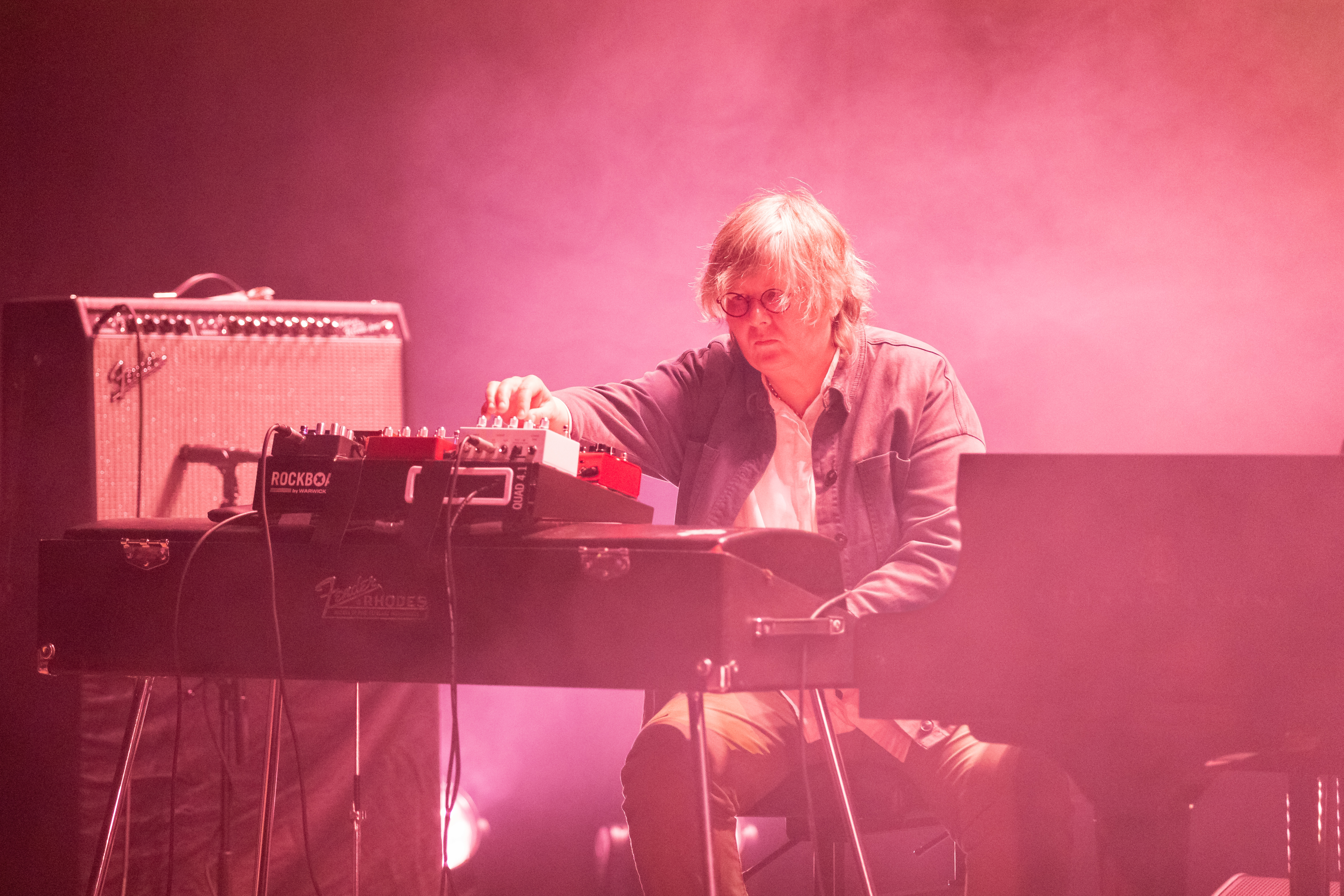
- Maria Kannegaard performing at Munch, Oslo 2024; Photo: Tore Sætre

Background information
- Born: 6 October 1970 (age 55); Copenhagen, Denmark
- Genres: Jazz
- Occupations: Musician, composer
- Instrument: Piano

Maria Kannegaard (born 6 October 1970) is a Danish-born Norwegian jazz musician and pianist. She has lived in Norway since age 10. She is known from her own Maria Kannegaard trio and cooperation with, among others Live Maria Roggen's LiveBand, Eldbjørg Raknes' Trio and TingeLing, and numerous appearances at Norwegian jazz festivals.

== Career ==
Kannegaard was born in Copenhagen. She was educated on the Jazz program at Trondheim Musikkonsevatorium (1992–1996). With Ole Morten Vågan (bass) and Thomas Strønen (drums) she is Maria Kannegaard Trio.

== Honors ==
- 2010: Kongsberg Jazz Award
- 2012: NTNU-ambassadør

== Discography ==
=== As leader/co-leader ===
Year recorded	Title	Label	Notes
2000?	Breaking the Surface	ACT Music	Trio, with Mats Eilertsen (double bass), Thomas Strønen (drums)
2005?	Quiet Joy	Jazzland/Universal	Trio, with Ole Morten Vågan (double bass), Thomas Strønen (drums)
2007?	Live in Oslo	MNJ	With trio, Trondheim Jazz Orchestra
2008?	Camel Walk	Jazzland	Trio, with Ole Morten Vågan (double bass), Thomas Strønen (drums)
2008?	Maryland	Moserobie Music Production	Quartet, with Håkon Kornstad (tenor sax), Ole Morten Vågan (double bass), Hakon MjaJohansen (drums)
2008?	Maryland Live!	Moserobie Music Production	In concert

=== Collaborations ===
- 1997: TingeLing (NorCD), with Eldbjørg Raknes’ TINGeLING
- 2005: Månge Röstar Talar (Bergland Productions), with Eldbjørg Raknes Trio (lyrics by Karin Boye)
- 2006: Survival Kit (Bergland Productions), with Siri Gjære
- 2007: I Live Suddenly (MYrecordings), with Eldbjørg Raknes’ 'TingeLing'
- 2007: Circuit Songs (Jazzland Recordings), with Live Maria Roggen
- 2007: Molecular Gastronomy (Rune Grammofon), with the Duo Iain Ballamy and Thomas Strønen, featuring Maria Kannegaard and Ashley Slater
- 2011: Monsters and Puppets (Gigafon), Duo with Thomas Strønen (drums, electronics)
- 2011: Song (Øra Fonogram), with Billy Fy
- 2013: Sidewalk Comedy (MNJ Records), with Trondheim Jazz Orchestra and Eirik Hegdal

Awards
Preceded by Ole Morten Vågan	Recipient of the Kongsberg Jazz Award; 2010	Succeeded by Arve Henriksen
