= Storytellers (Norwegian band) =

Norwegian jazz group

- Origin: Trondheim, Norway
- Genres: Jazz
- Years active: 1992–present
- Label: Curling Legs
- Members: Eivind Aakhus; Nils-Olav Johansen; Svein Folkvord; Sverre Gjørvad

Storytellers (established 1992 in Trondheim, Norway) is a Norwegian experimental Jazz band exploring the interface between music and lyrics.

Storytellers released the album Enjoy Storytellers in 1994.

== Band members ==
- Eivind Aakhus (composer, lyricist)
- Nils-Olav Johansen (guitar)
- Svein Folkvord (composer, double bass)
- Sverre Gjørvad (composer, drums)

== Discography ==
- Enjoy Storytellers! – (1994, Curling Legs)
