= Jon Klette =

Norwegian jazz musician (1962–2016)

- Born: 9 May 1962
- Died: 31 July 2016 (aged 54); Oslo
- Occupation: Jazz saxophonist

Jon Klette (9 May 1962 – 31 July 2016) was a Norwegian jazz musician, alto saxophone player, composer and record producer.

== Biography ==
Klette was born on 9 May 1962.

With his group Jazzmob Klette released the albums The Truth in 1999, and Pathfinder in 2003. He established the record company Jazzaway Records in 2003. He started the band Crimetime Orchestra, where he played with other musicians such as Paal Nilssen-Love, Ingebrigt Håker Flaten, Vidar Johansen, Bugge Wesseltoft, Per Zanussi, Sjur Miljeteig and Kjetil Møster, and their albums include Life Is a Beautiful Monster (2004), Atomic Symphony (2009).

He died in Oslo on 31 July 2016.
