= Tor Haugerud =

Norwegian jazz drummer and percussionist (born 1962)

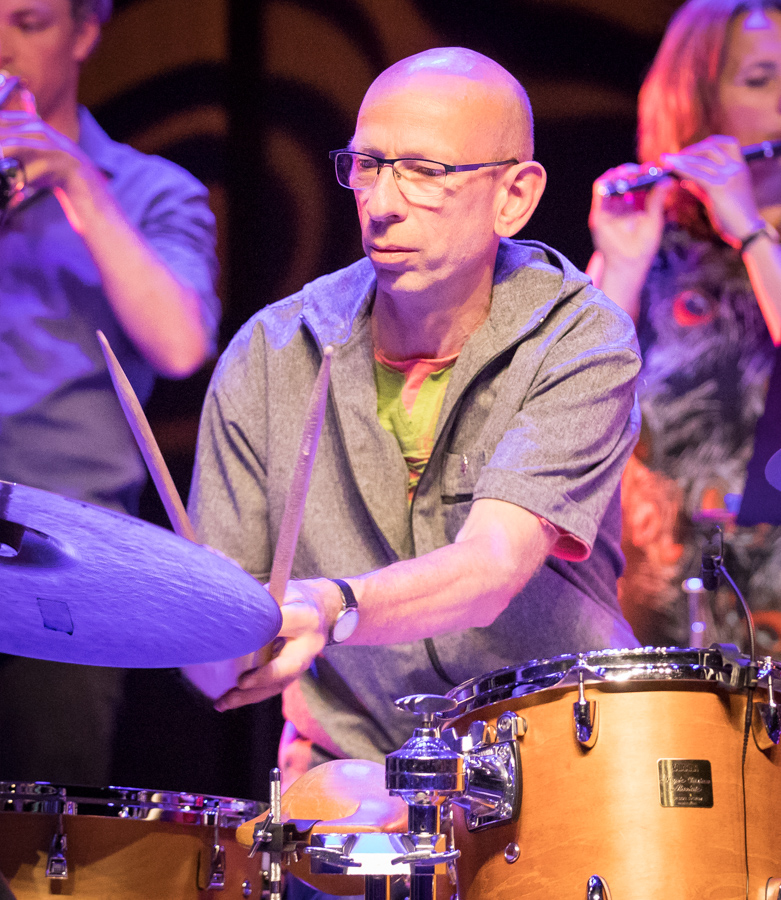
- Haugerud in 2017

Background information
- Born: Tor Andreas Haugerud; 7 January 1962 (age 64); Brattvåg, Norway
- Genres: Jazz
- Occupations: Musician and composer
- Instrument: Percussion
- Website: torhaugerud.no

Tor Andreas Haugerud (born 7 January 1962 in Brattvåg) is a Norwegian jazz musician (drums and percussion) known from Transjoik, Blixband, BOL, Möster Trio, and has created his own avant-garde band "MisterYtor" ("Nordland Musikkfestuke", 2006).

== Career ==
Haugerud is an experienced drummer and percussionist, living in Trondheim, Norway. As a musician, he has developed his own unconventional style based on improvised music influenced by the European contemporary music scene. He was involved in a production under "Trondheim Jazzfestival" (2005), and has contributed for "Cirka Teater", showing his background as a physical actor and performance artist in projects of surrealistic art, in groups like "Cirka Teater", "MisterYtor" and "Teater Fot", in which he also is a composer. At "SoddJazz" 2006 he performed with Trio Alpaca, and is now a member of Alpaca Ensemble which has released the records Tapet Tapet and Elevator with music composed by Eirik Hegdal.

Haugerud is playing in the Jazz trio ÉnÉnÉn with Eirik Hegdal and Michael Francis Duch, and in the bands "Gibrish" and "Bengalo". In 2008 he joined the free improvisation group "Murmur"/Muringa comprising Kim Myhr, Martin Taxt, Klaus Holm in addition to Haugerud. He also plays the improvisation duo Vertex with Petter Vågan. They released the album Shapes & Phases (2010) at the label Sofa, followed by extensive touring in among other places Germany and the United States.

Haugerud is also a guest lecturer at the Music Performance Studies at the Trondheim Musikkonservatorium.

== Discography ==
With Bol

- Bol – (2001, Via Music)
- Silver Sun – (2005, Curling Legs)
- Skylab – (2007, NorCD)
- Numb, Number – (2012, Gigafon)

With Transjoik

- Uja Nami – (2004, Vuelie), nominated for the Spellemannprisen
- Bewafá – (2005, Vuelie), with Sher Miandad Khan from Pakistan on vocals

With Trondheim Jazz Orchestra

- We Are – (2005, Jazzaway Records), with Eirik Hegdal
- Live in Oslo – (2007, MNJ Records), with Maria Kannegaard Trio
- Wood And Water – (2008, MNJ Records), with Eirik Hegdal
- Stems And Cages – (2010, MNJ Records), with Kim Myhr
- Morning Songs – (2011, MNJ Records), with Per Zanussi

with Eirik Hegdal's Alpaca Ensemble

- Tapet Tapet – (2007, Jazzaway Records)
- Elevator

with Vertex Duo Petter Vågan

- Shapes & Phases – (2010, Sofa)

with ÉnÉnÉn

- Rød & Blå – (2010, Øra Fonogram)

with Muringa

- The Unknown Knowns – (2011, Sofa)
