= TINGeLING =

Norwegian jazz band

- Origin: Trondheim, Norway
- Genres: Jazz,
- Years active: 1997–present
- Labels: My Recordings, NorCD
- Members: Eldbjørg Raknes; Nils-Olav Johansen; Maria Kannegaard; Per Oddvar Johansen
- Website: Eldbjørg Raknes on Platearbeiderne.no

TINGeLING (established 1997 in Trondheim, Norway) is a Norwegian jazz band, initiated by vocalist Eldbjørg Raknes.

The band's pianist Maria Kannegaard, has been replaced by Christian Wallumrød (2001) or Steinar Nickelsen (2003–). They toured in Norway 2002, with a performance where they presented lyrics by Karin Boye, and has also been widely used at Norwegian jazz festivals, as well as internationally (e.g. Montreaux Jazz Festival, 2004). Supported by Norsk Jazzforum, TINGeLING toured Scandinavia, France and Belgium (2005), and performed Norway's contribution to Jazz around the world (2006).

== Band members ==
- Eldbjørg Raknes – vocals
- Nils-Olav Johansen – guitar
- Maria Kannegaard – keyboards
- Per Oddvar Johansen – percussion

== Discography ==
- TINGeLING (1997, NorCD), with lyrics by Rudyard Kipling, Ernest Hemingway and Emily Dickinson
- So much depends upon a red wheel barrow (2002, Platearbeiderne), commissioned work for «Vossajazz»
- I live suddenly (2006, My Recordings), with lyrics by Paul Celan, Emily Brontë, Robert Frost, Pablo Neruda, Dorothy Parker.
