= Kongsberg Jazzfestival =

Jazz festival in Norway

Kongsberg Jazz Festival Kongsberg Jazzfestival
- Kongsberg Jazzfestival logo.
- Status: Active
- Genre: Jazz Festival
- Date: Early July
- Frequency: Annually
- Location: Kongsberg
- Country: Norway
- Years active: 1964 – present
- Inaugurated: Founded 1963
- Website: kongsbergjazz.no

Kongsberg Jazz Festival or Kongsberg Jazzfestival is an international jazz festival that has been held annually in Kongsberg, Norway, since 1964.

== Artists ==
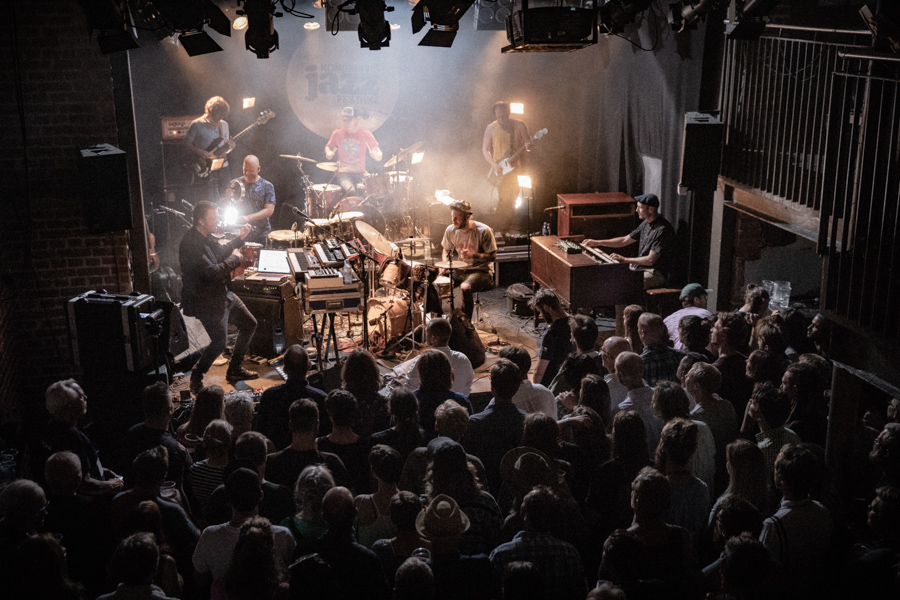
A concert at Energimølla during the 2018 festival.

Several worldwide great artists have visited Kongsberg during this festival. International stars including Chick Corea, Herbie Hancock, John Scofield, Nigel Kennedy, Niels-Henning Ørsted Pedersen, Dee Dee Bridgewater, Charles Mingus, Wayne Shorter, Dianne Reeves, McCoy Tyner, Radka Toneff, Bobby McFerrin, John Butcher, Anthony Braxton, Diana Krall and Pat Metheny have played in Kongsberg several times.

The festival has also offered performance opportunities for young musicians, and many now-renowned Norwegian jazz artists began their careers at Kongsberg.

== Awards ==
The Kongsberg Jazz Award (also called the DNB award, established in 1996) was an award given to the most prominent Norwegian jazz artists of the year at the festival, given in cooperation with DNB. The award was previously known as the DnB NOR Award, the Vital Award and the KlartSvar Award, reflecting its various sponsors over the years.

Until 2011, the prize was 100,000 Norwegian kroner, but from 2012 it was increased to 300,000 Norwegian kroner, making it the largest jazz prize in Norway. As part of the prize, the recipient performed a concert at the festival the following year.

=== Award winners ===
Year	Award winners	Instruments
2025	Hanna Paulsberg	saxophone
2024	Henriette Eilertsen	flute
2023	Per Zanussi	upright bass
2022	Thomas Strønen	drums/percussion
2021	Anja Lauvdal	keyboards
2019	Hedvig Mollestad Thomassen	guitar
2018	Eirik Hegdal	saxophone
2017	Marius Neset	saxophone
2016	Susanna Wallumrød	vocals
2015	Ellen Andrea Wang	bass
2014	Mathias Eick	trumpet
2013	Håkon Mjåset Johansen	drums
2012	Ola Kvernberg	violin
2011	Arve Henriksen	trumpet
2010	Maria Kannegaard	piano
2009	Ole Morten Vågan	double bass
2008	Helge Lien	piano
2007	Morten Qvenild	piano
2006	Håvard Wiik	piano
2005	Solveig Slettahjell	vocals
2004	Ingebrigt Håker Flaten	double bass
2003	Live Maria Roggen	vocals
2002	Håkon Kornstad Trio; Håkon Kornstad; Paal Nilssen-Love; Mats Eilertsen	saxophone drums upright-bass
2001	Christian Wallumrød	piano
2000	Petter Wettre	saxophone
1999	Audun Kleive	drums
1998	Sidsel Endresen	vocals
1997	Bugge Wesseltoft	piano
1996	Nils Petter Molvær	trumpet
