= Thomas T. Dahl =

Norwegian musician (born 1973)

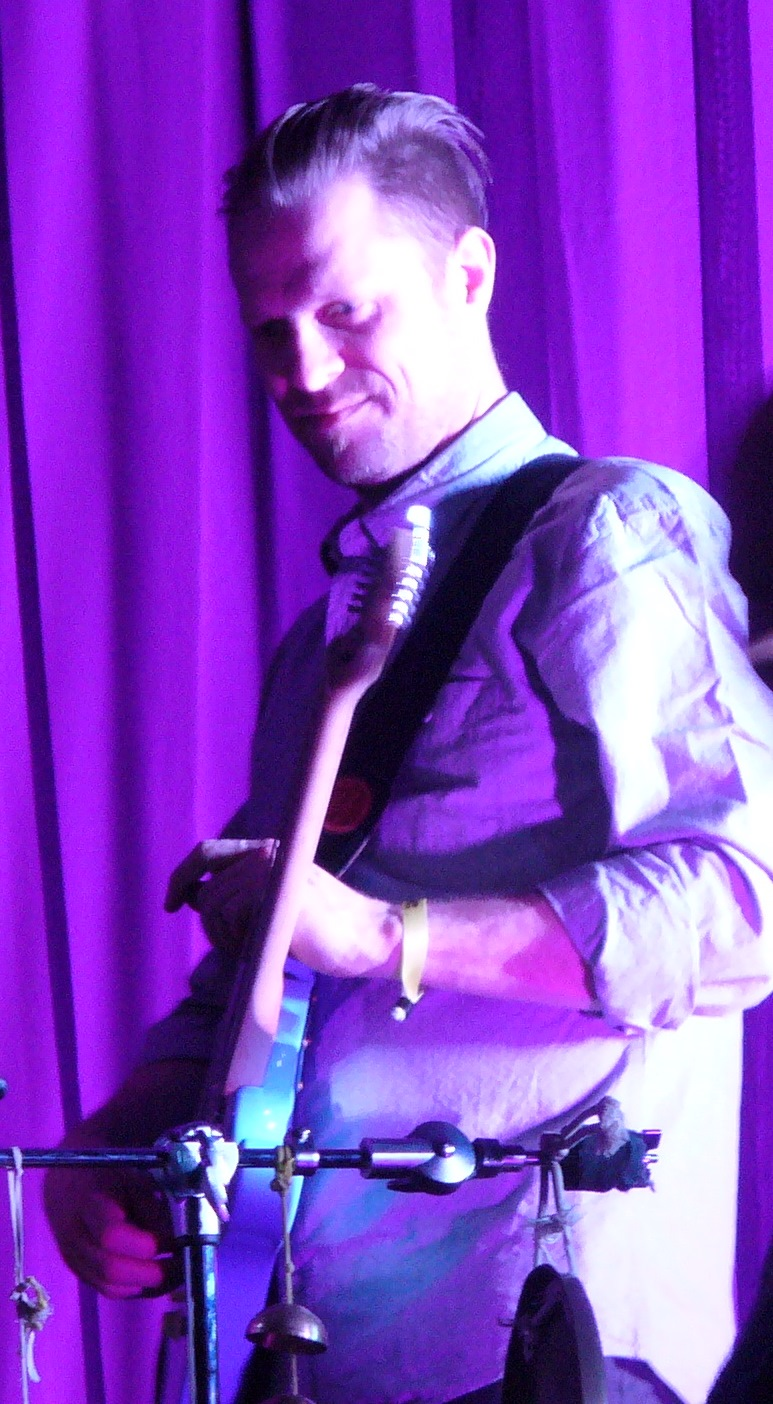
- Dahl at Vossajazz 2014.

Background information
- Born: Thomas Tellevik Dahl; 7 September 1973 (age 53); Bergen, Hordaland
- Origin: Norway
- Genres: Jazz
- Occupations: Musician, composer
- Instrument: Guitar
- Website: www.thomastdahl.com

Thomas Tellevik Dahl (born 7 September 1973) is a Norwegian jazz musician (guitar), music educator and composer, known from a series recordings, among others within bands like Krøyt and Dingobats.

== Career ==
Dahl is educated at the "Skeisvang videregående skole"(Skeisvang high school) in Haugesund Municipality (1989–92), "Sund folkehøgskole" in Inderøy Municipality (1992–93) and on the Jazz program at Trondheim Musikkonservatorium (1993–98). Dahl has released several albums and received Spellemannprisen 1999 with Krøyt (1993–2005), joined the band Dingobats (1995–2005), releasing three albums and within John Pål Inderberg's twelve-tone Quartet (1995–96), and Erlend Skomsvoll's "Skomsork" (1996–02).

He has written commissioned works for Nattjazz 2004 (Norsk Hydro), for "Finsejazz" 2005, and with Per Jørgensen and Frank Jakobsen, composed "Tomlane opp" (2006). Dahl has worked as a music educator on the Jazz program at Trondheim Musikkonservatorium (NTNU), Agder Musikkonservatorium, HiA (2002–05) and Griegakademiet, University of Bergen (2005–), where he is associate professor.

Thomas T Dahls main projects are "Thomas Dahl & Court" with Harmen Fraanje, Magne Thormodsæter and Håkon Mjåset Johansen, and "Skydive Trio" with Mats Eilertsen and Olavi Louhivuori.

Thomas Dahl & Court released their debut album "Quilter" (Losen Records) in 2019.

Skydive Trio released their first album "Sun Moee" in 2015 (Hubro). Skydive Trio comes out of Mats Eilertsens Skydive Quintet who also feature Tore Brunborg (tenor saxophone) and Alexi Tuomarila (Piano). He has also released two albums with BMX: Øyvind Skarbø (Drums), Njål Ølnes (tenor saxophone) and Per Jørgensen (trumpet, voice, perc).

== Honors ==
- Spellemannprisen 1999 – Krøyt – for the album Low
- Edvard Prize 2000 – Krøyt – for the composition "Silent»
- Vossajazzprisen 2002

== Discography ==
2019:

   Thomas Dahl & Court: Quilter (Losen records)
   Eivind Austad Trio: Northbound (Losen Records) as Producer (Releasedate 31.05.19)

2018:

   Michael Wallace Quartet: Hinterland (michaelwallacemusic.com)
   Skydive Trio: Sun Sparkle (Hubro)
   Ole Marius Sandberg: Ensemble (Skaret Music)

2017:

   Anne Hvidsten: Desembersang (Singel) (Anne Hvidsten music & media)
   Christine Sandtorv: I Mellom Skyer (Ifemmera Records)
   Ragnar Blichfeldt: Guder og Glitter (Tylden)
   Bergen Big Band & Dag Arnesen: Norwegian Song IV (ODIN)
   Lekerommet: Kyllingen som ikke kunne synge (Lekerommet/Bergen Jazzforum)

2016:

    Mats Eilertsen, Eirik Hegdal, Trygve Seim, Harmen Fraanje, and Olavi Louhivuori: Rubicon (ECM Records, 2016), commission for the 2014 Vossajazz
    Eivind Austad Trio: Moving (Ozella) - as Producer
    Knut Kristiansen & Bergen Big Band: Kuria Suite (Grappa) - as Producer

2015:

   SkyDive Trio: Sun Moee (Hubro)[9]
   Voksne Herrers Orkester: En Hyllest til Logen (Grappa)

2014:

   BMX: Rozel Point (Øyvind Jazzforum)
   Calle Hamre: Why do they call it Dying (Singel) (YFM)

2013:

   VHO: Hem Til Jul (Egil Eldøen)
   Ugress: Another Planet EP (Uncanny Planet)
   Lise Olden: Min Skattekiste (Loe Prod.)

2012:

   Kåre Kalvenes: Biter av Tid (Kåre Kalvenes)
   Ugress: Time Machine EP (Uncanny Planet)
   Qvales Ensemble: Bohem (Kirkelig Kulturverksted)
   HighasaKite : All That Floats Will Rain (Riot Factory/Highasakite)
   HighasaKite : Son Of A  (Single) (Riot Factory/Highasakite)

2011:

   Ugress: Wulfhöken Spaceport Affairs (Uncanny Planet)
   HighasaKite : Indian Summer (Single) (Riot Factory/Highasakite)
   Jan Eggum : Kjærlighet & Ærlighet 3 (Grappa Records)
   Mats Eilertsen : Skydive (Hubro) Norwegian Grammy Nomination

2010:

   BMX : Bergen Open (NorCD)
   Erik Moll : Fram til i dag (EMM Records)
   Jan Toft : Alle e aleina (WEA) Norwegian Grammy Nomination
   St. Satan : Horns for Adornment (Grindar)
   Elg : Storm (Big Box Records)

2009:

   Mats Eilertsen : Radio Yonder (Hubro)
   Christine Sandtorv : Stjerneteller – Godnattsanger (Ifemmera Records)

2008:

   Guttene : Du e' i Bergen no (Breiflabb Records)
   Pinocchio : Ai-Ai-Ai Pinocchio er her (Pinocchio)
   Vamp : St. Mandag (Major Selskapet) Norwegian Grammy Nomination

2007:

   Elvin Friendly : Elvin Friendly (Music Business Norway AS)
   Terje Nilsen : Portrett (Grammofon)
   Kloster : Big Fish (Kloster)
   Erlend Ropstad : Bright Late Nights (REC 90)

2006:

   Kristin Asbjørnsen : Factotum (Milan Music)
   Heidi Marie Vestrheim : Beautiful Houses (Bluebox Records)
   Christine Sandtorv : First Last Dance (Ifemmera Records)
   Siri Gjære : Survival Kit (Bergland Production)
   Erlend Skomsvoll : Variasjoner (Grappa Records)

2005:

   Linda Fosse Hagen : Eit Eventyr (Linda Fosse Hagen)

2004:

   Dingobats : Follow (Jazzaway Records)
   Christine Guldbrandsen : Moments (EPIC)
   Ephemera : Monolove (Ephemera Records)
   Skomsork : Skomsork (Park Grammofon) Norwegian Grammy Nomination

2003:

   Karin Park : Superworldunknown (Waterfall Records) Norwegian Grammy Nomination

2002:

   Ivar Neergaard : Mulle Miktor Synger og Fantasoferer (Bergen Records) Norwegian Grammy Nomination
   Dingobats : Pöck (Bergland Production)

2001:

   KRØYT : Body Electric (MNW)
   Lars Erik Drevvatne : Keys on and off (Acoustic Records)
   KRØYT : One Heart Is Too Small (MNW) Norwegian Grammy Nomination

1999:

   Blå – Blå i Molde (w/KRØYT) (BP)
   KRØYT : Low (BP) SNorwegian Grammy Winner
   KRØYT : Shall I Forget? (Single) (BP)

1998:

   Lina Holt : 14736 Tekopper (Teselskapet)
   Dingobats : The New Dingobats Generation (Turn Left Productions)

1997:

   KRØYT : Sub (Curling Legs Productions)
   Bluescreen : Change (Arcade Music/MSO)

1993:

   SFH '93 (SFH)

Awards
Preceded by Stein Inge Brækhus	Recipient of the Vossajazzprisen; 2002	Succeeded by Kåre Opheim
