= Sverre Gjørvad =

Norwegian jazz musician and composer (born 1966)

- Born: 26 October 1966 (age 59); Stathelle, Bamble Municipality, Telemark
- Origin: Norway
- Genre: Jazz
- Occupations: Musician, composer
- Instrument: Drums
- Labels: Reflect Records; Jazzaway Records; Curling Legs; Losen Records
- Website: Sverre Gjørvad on Myspace

Sverre Gjørvad (born 26 October 1966 in Stathelle, Norway) is a Norwegian jazz musician (drums) and composer. He is known for participating in establishing the SoddJazz festival and recording with various notable musicians including Live Maria Roggen, Ståle Storløkken, Mats Eilertsen and Nils-Olav Johansen.

== Career ==
Gjørvad studied jazz at Trondheim Musikkonservatorium, while performing with Bodega Band and Storytellers, with Nils-Olav Johansen (guitar) and Svein Folkvord (bass). Storytellers released their album Enjoy Storytellers! in 1994. He has performed with Dingobats, along with Eirik Hegdal (saxophone), Njål Ølnes (saxophone), Thomas T. Dahl (guitar), and Mats Eilertsen (bass). As regional musician in Nord-Trøndelag, Gjørvad taught music and composed the work Jazz Pathetique for the SoddJazz festival in 1999.

In 2006, Gjørvad moved to Hammerfest Municipality, where he currently works as producer for the Arctic Cultural Centre. He also leads his own quartet, doing occasional concerts and tours around Norway.

== Discography ==
=== Solo albums ===
- 2001: Denne lille pytten er et hav (Curling Legs), texts by Jan Kjærstad (Forføren and Speil) and novels by Peter Handke, which featured Live Maria Roggen (vocals), Ståle Storløkken (keyboards), Nils-Olav Johansen (guitar), Mats Eilertsen (bass), and Øyvind Brekke (trombone).
- 2011: Patience For The Little Things (Reflect Records), with Siri Gjære, Ståle Storløkken, Mark Fransman, Brydon Bolton, Gorm Helfjord, and Melanie Scholtz.
- 2019: Voi River (Losen Records), with Herborg Rundberg, Kristian Olstad and Dag Okstad.
- 2020: Elegy of Skies (Losen Records), with Herborg Rundberg, Kristian Olstad, Dag Okstad and Joakim Milder.
- 2021: Time To Illuminate Earth (Losen Records), with Herborg Rundberg, Kristian Olstad, Dag Okstad and Embrik Snerte.
- 2022: Here Comes The Sun (Losen Records), with Herborg Rundberg, Kristian Olstad, Dag Okstad and Eirik Hegdal.
- 2024: six pieces for cinema (Tyven Records), with Dag Okstad, Herborg Rundberg, Kristian Olstad.

=== Collaborations ===
With Epinastic Movements

- 1994: Rapid (Pop Eye)

With Storytellers

- 1994: Enjoy Storytellers! (Curling Legs)

With Dingobats

- 1998: The New Dingobats Generation (Turn Left Productions)
- 2002: Pöck (Bergland Productions)
- 2004: Follow (Jazzaway Records)

With Kjellerbandet

- 1999: Kjellerbandet På Plate ()

With Richard Badendyck

- 2004: That's All (Jazzavdelingen)

With Jienat

- 2010: Mira (Jienat)

With Ivar Thomassen

- 2011: Særlig Når Timan E Blå (Reflect)

With Håkon Follien

- 2019: Prærien Super (Tyven Records)
