= Mats Eilertsen =

Norwegian jazz musician and composer (born 1975)

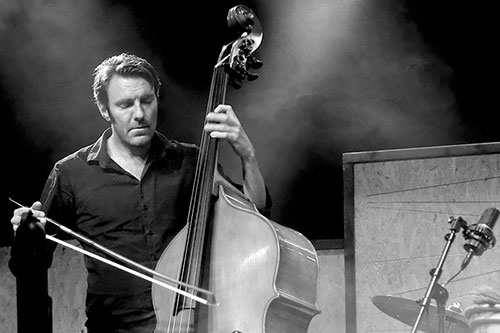
- Eilertsen at Aarhus Jazz Festival 2015 in Denmark with Pablo Held, Helge Norbakken, Christian Vuust, and Jacob Buchanan

Background information
- Born: 4 March 1975 (age 51); Trondheim, Sør-Trøndelag
- Origin: Norway
- Genres: Jazz
- Occupations: Musician, composer
- Instruments: Double bass, bass guitar, drums
- Labels: Jazzaway; Hubro Music, ECM
- Website: www.matseilertsen.com

Mats Eilertsen (born 4 March 1975) is a Norwegian jazz musician and composer. He is known for recording with numerous bands, including the Maria Kannegaard Trio, Ola Kvernberg, Nils Økland, Eldbjørg Raknes, Anders Aarum Trio, Eirik Hegdal, Sverre Gjørvad, Nymark Collective, SKRUK, «Jazzmob», «Dingobats», Håkon Kornstad Trio, Food with Iain Ballamy, Jacob Young Band, Solveig Slettahjell's Slow Motion Orchestra, Håvard Wiik Trio, and «JazzCode».

== Career ==
Eilertsen was born in Trondheim and attended the Trondheim Musikkonservatorium, where he participated in the Jazz program and was part of the Jazz band Dingobats along with fellow students Eirik Hegdal (saxophones), Njål Ølnes (tenor saxophone), Thomas Dahl (guitar) and Sverre Gjørvad (drums), primarily playing Hegdals compositions. He has two band releases as leader of the band Turanga, with band members Fredrik Ljungkvist, Ernst Reijseger, and Thomas Strønen. He also performed with the quartet «Parish», with some of the same members as of «Turanga». In 2006, he released the album Constellations (Jazzaway Records), with the Finnish pianist Alexi Tuomarila's trio, along with Olavi Luohivuori.

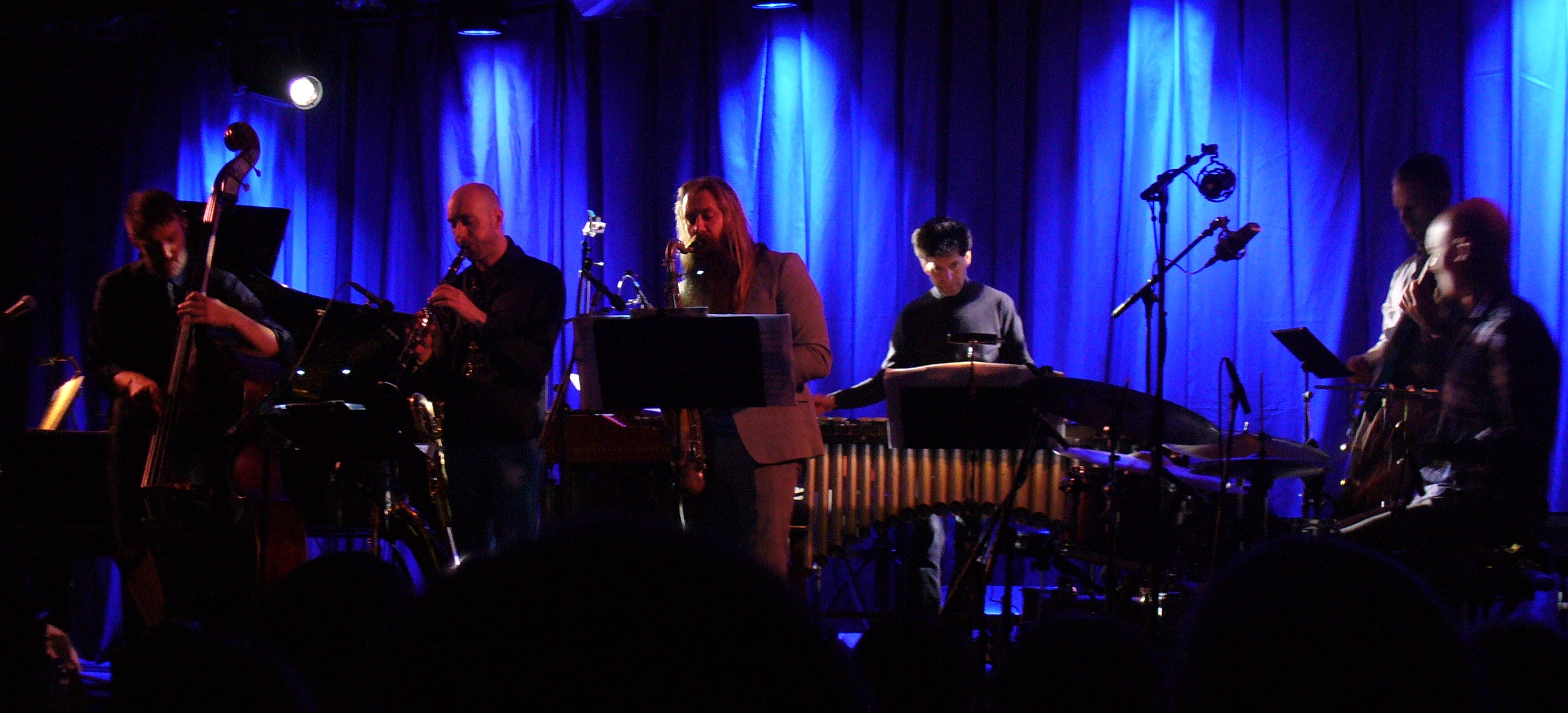
Rubicon, Eilertsen's commission for Vossajazz 2014, with Thomas Dahl, Trygve Seim, Olavi Louhivuori, Harmen Fraanje, Rob Waring and Eirik Hegdal.

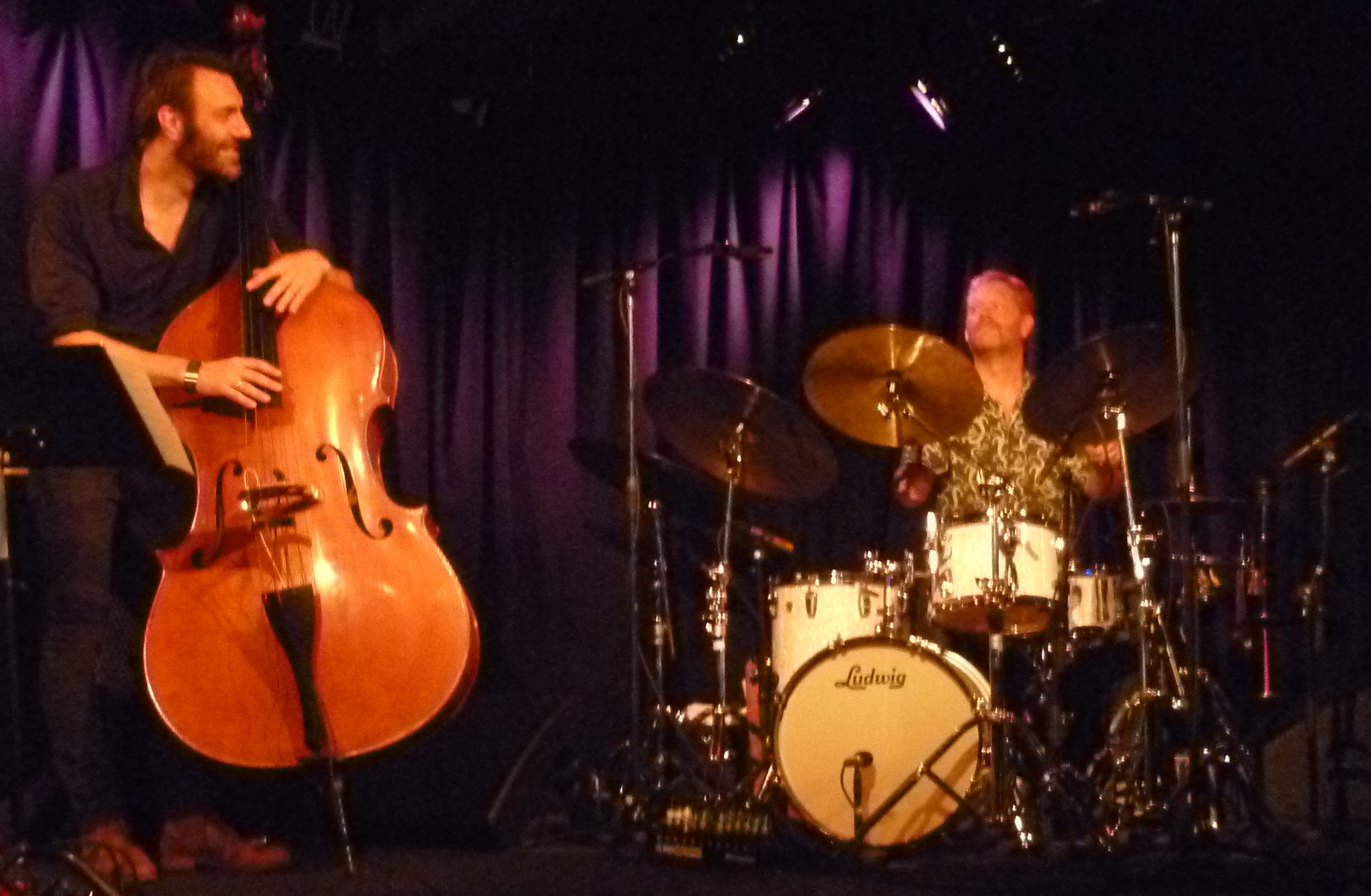
Eilertsen and Per Oddvar Johansen at the 2016 Nattjazz in Bergen, Norway.

== Honors ==
- 2002: Kongsberg Jazz Award, within Håkon Kornstad Trio

== Discography ==
=== Solo albums ===
- 2005: Turanga (Aim Records), with Turanga (voted this year's release of the Japanese jazz magazine Music Magazine)
- 2006: Flux (Aim Records), with Turanga
- 2009: Radio Yonder (Hubro Music), with Tore Brunborg, Olavi Louhivuori, and Thomas T. Dahl
- 2016: Rubicon (ECM Records), with Eirik Hegdal, Thomas T Dahl, Trygve Seim, Harmen Fraanje, and Olavi Louhivuori (commission for the 2014 Vossajazz)
- 2019: Reveries and Revelations (Hubro Music), with Thomas Strønen Arve Henriksen Eivind Aarset Geir Sundstøl and Per Oddvar Johansen
- 2021: Hymn for Hope (Hemli), with Thomas Dahl: guitar; Tore Brunborg: saxophone; Hans Hulbækmo: drums

SkyDive Trio

- 2011: SkyDive (Hubro Music)
- 2015: Sun Moee (Hubro Music)

Mats Eilertsen Trio including with Harmen Fraanje and Thomas Strønen

- 2013: Sails Set (Hubro Music)
- 2019: And Then Comes the Night (ECM)

=== Collaborations ===
Within Dingobats

- 1998: The New Dingobats Generation
- 2002: Pöck (Bergland Productions), which featured Live Maria Roggen (vocals)
- 2004: Follow (Jazzaway Records)

Within Food (Iain Ballamy, Arve Henriksen & Thomas Strønen)

- 2000: Food (Feral Records)
- 2001: Organic and GM Food (Feral Records)
- 2002: Veggie (Rune Grammofon)
- 2004: Last Supper (Rune Grammofon)

Within Håvard Wiik Trio

- 2003: Postures (Jazzland Acoustic)

With Jacob Young

- 2004: Evening Falls (ECM)
- 2008: Sideways (ECM)

Alexi Tuomarila Trio (Olavi Louhivuori)

- 2006: Constellation (Jazzaway - JARCD 030)
- 2013: Seven Hills (Edition Records - EDN1041)
- 2017: Kingdom (Edition Records - EDN1090)

Within Tord Gustavsen Ensemble/Quartet

- 2009: Restored, Returned (ECM Records)
- 2012: The Well (ECM Records)
- 2014: Extended Circle (ECM Records)

With Yelena Eckemoff

- 2012: Forget-me-not (L & H Production)

With Tuva Halse's Bento Box Trio

- 2024: Somehow I Lost My Way (Fjordgata Records)

Compilation projects

- 2007: Short Stories (Aim Records) with Frode Haltli and Torbjørn Dyrud
- 2010: Elegy (Hubro) with Harmen Fraanje and Thomas Strønen

Awards
Preceded by Christian Wallumrød	Recipient of the Kongsberg Jazz Award; 2002	Succeeded by Live Maria Roggen
