= Eirik Hegdal =

Norwegian jazz saxophonist, composer, and arranger (born 1973)

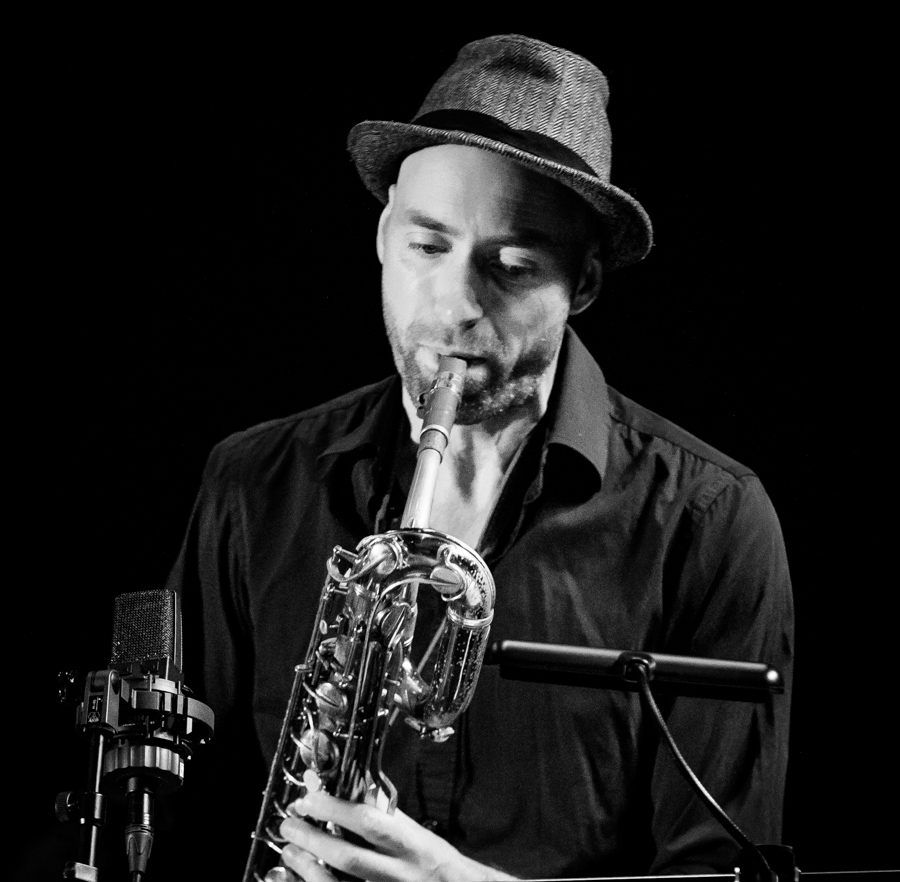
- Hegdal at the 2017 Kongsberg Jazzfestival

Background information
- Born: 3 October 1973 (age 52); Gjøvik, Oppland, Norway
- Genres: Jazz
- Occupations: Musician, composer, arranger, music teacher
- Instrument: Saxophone
- Website: eirikhegdal.com

Eirik Hegdal (born 3 October 1973 in Gjøvik, Norway) is a Norwegian Jazz musician (saxophone), composer, arranger and music teacher, known from the band Dingobats (1995-2005) and as leader of Trondheim Jazz Orchestra (from 2002).

== Career ==
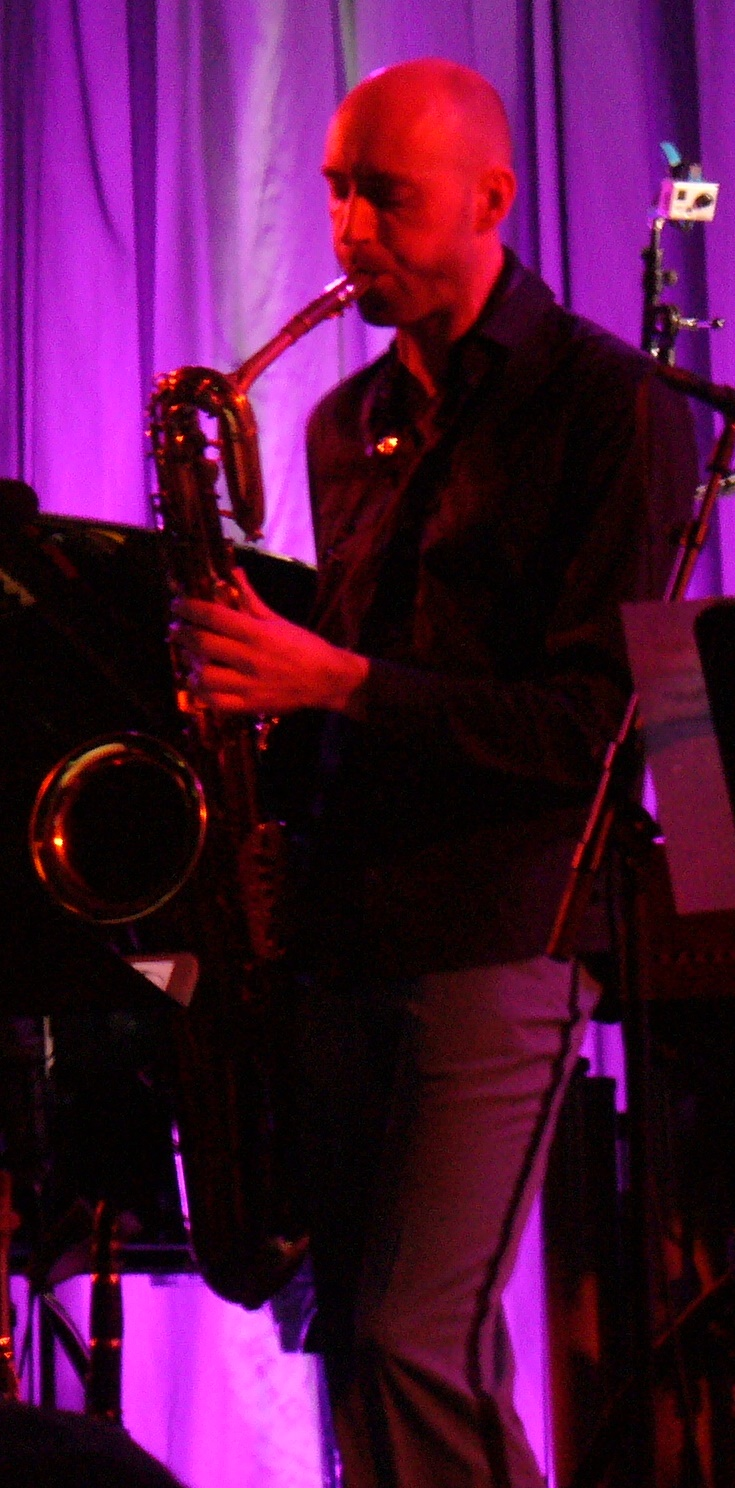
Eirik Hegdal at Vossajazz 2014

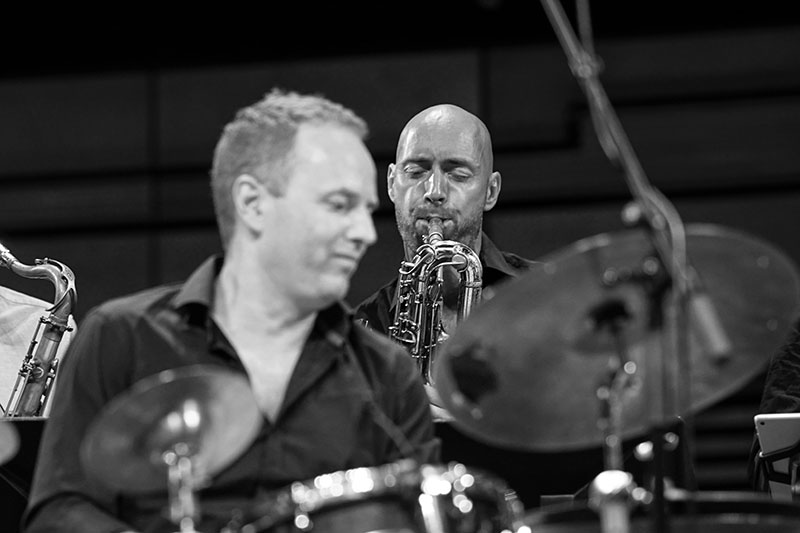
With Trondheim Jazz Orchestra at Reykjavik Jazz Festival 2017

After a year at Sund folkehøgskole, he attended the Jazz program at Trondheim Musikkonservatorium (1995–98), where he established the band Dingobats, with Njål Ølnes (tenor saxophone), Thomas Dahl (guitar), Mats Eilertsen (bass) and Sverre Gjørvad (drums), primarily playing Hegdals compositions. He later took over as leader of the Trondheim Jazz Orchestra, after pianist Erlend Skomsvoll. In 2006 he performed the commissioned work for the Trondheim Jazz Orchestra, Space is still the place with the US saxophonist Joshua Redman as guest soloist.

In 2002, Hegdal with drummer Tor Haugerud, started a collaboration with the classic piano trio Alpaca Trio, consisting of Else Bø (piano), Sigrid Elisabeth Stang (violin) and Marianne Baudouin Lie (cello). The group works with compositions by Hegdal in the intersection of improvisation and contemporary music, and released under the band name Alpaca Ensemble the EP Skråpanel and an album Tapet Tapet!, both in 2007. In 2010 came a tentet edition of the same ensemble piece Elevator, a collaboration between Hegdal and poet Matt Burt, with an album release from the premiere performance at Trondheim Kammermusikkfestival i 2008.

== Honors ==
- 2006: Commissioned work at Moldejazz, with Trondheim Jazz Orchestra and Joshua Redman
- 2015: Spellemannprisen, with Team Hegdal in the Jazz category, for the album Vol. 3

== Discography ==
=== Solo albums ===
Within Team Hegdal

- 2010: Vol 1 (Øra Fonogram)
- 2011: Vol 2 (Øra Fonogram)
- 2015: Vol 3 (Particular Recordings)

=== Collaborations ===
With «Dingobats»

- The New Dingobats Generation (Turn Left Prod., 1998)
- Pöck (Bergland Prod., 2001)
- Follow (Jazzaway, 2004)

With «Zanussi 5»

- Zanussi 5 (Moserobie, 2004)
- Alborado (Moserobie, 2006)
- Ghost Dance (Moserobie, 2010)

With «Trondheim Jazz Orchestra»

- We are? (Jazzaway, 2004)
- Live in Oslo (MNJ Records, 2006), with «Maria Kannegaard Trio»
- Wood and Water (MNJ Records, 2008)
- Triads and More (MNJ Records, 2010), with Joshua Redman
- Sidewalk Comedy (MNJ Records, 2013), as featured artist

With «Alpaca Ensemble»

- Skråpanel (EP, Øra Fonogram/Jazzaway, 2007)
- Tapet Tapet! (Øra Fonogram/Jazzaway, 2007)
- Elevator (Øra Fonogram, 2010)

With «Lord Kelvin»

- Dances in the Smoke (Jazzland, 2009)
- Radio Has No Future (Gigafon, 2011)

With Eldbjørg Raknes

- From Frozen Feet Heat Came (MyRecordings, 2010)

With «EnEnEn» Tor Haugerud, Michael Francis Duch

- Rød & Blå (Øra Fonogram, 2010)

With «Trondheim Sinfonietta»

- ''Snowblind (Øra Fonogram, 2011)

With Mats Eilertsen, Thomas T. Dahl, Trygve Seim, Harmen Fraanje, and Olavi Louhivuori

- Rubicon (ECM Records, 2016), commission for the 2014 Vossajazz

Awards
Preceded by Marius Neset & Trondheim Jazz Orchestra	Recipient of the Jazz Spellemannprisen; 2015	Succeeded by Nils Petter Molvær
