= Live Maria Roggen =

Norwegian jazz singer, songwriter and composer

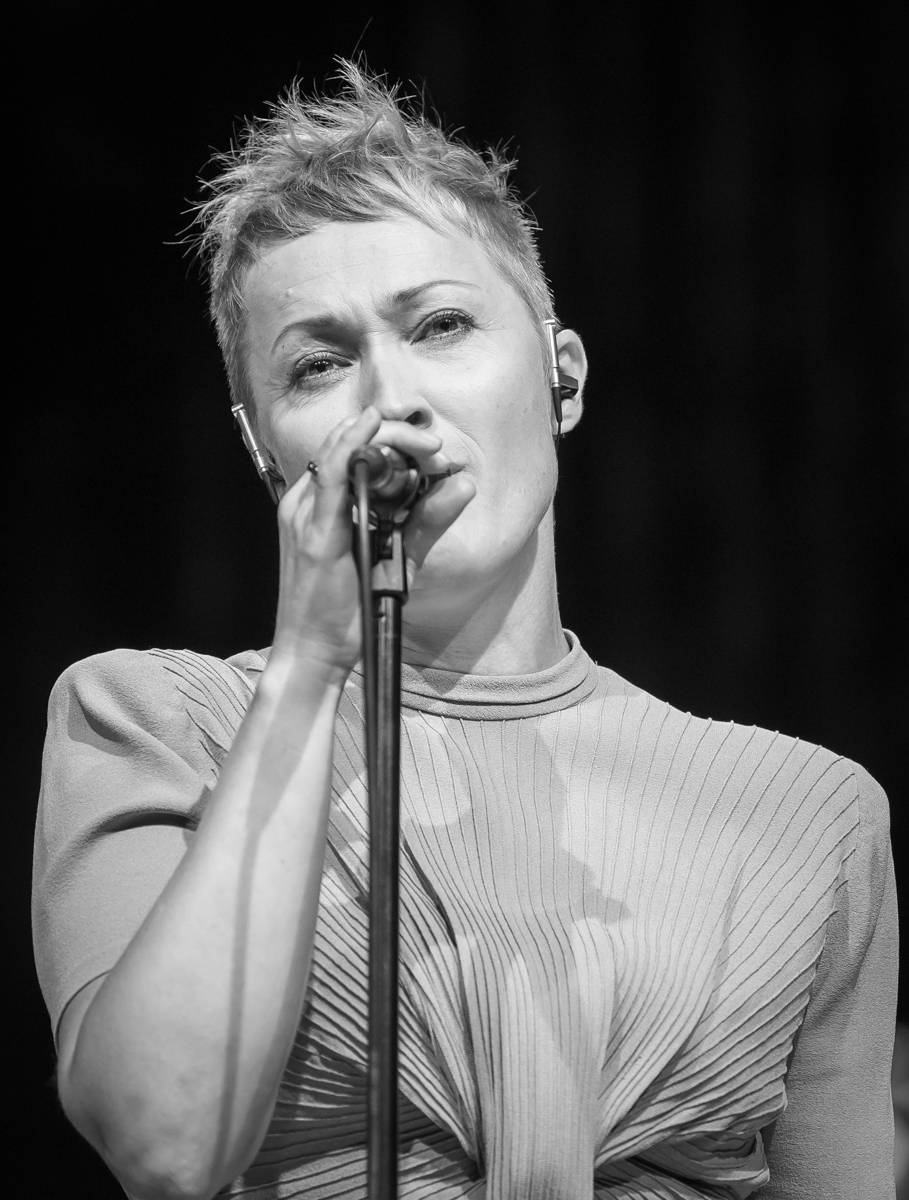
- Roggen at Oslo Jazzfestival 2016

Background information
- Born: 22 March 1970 (age 56); Oslo
- Origin: Norway
- Genres: Jazz
- Occupations: Jazz singer, songwriter, composer
- Instruments: Violin, vocals
- Website: www.livemaria.no

Live Maria Roggen (born 22 March 1970) is a Norwegian jazz singer, songwriter, and composer.

Roggen was born in Oslo and educated at Foss High School (violin and vocals). She studied sociology and musicology intermediate at the University of Oslo and Jazz Line at Trøndelag Conservatory of Music (NTNU) (1995–1998). She worked as a jazz and singing teacher at the Sund folkehøgskole, Høgskolen in Agder (music conservatory) and at Trøndelag Conservatory of Music (NTNU). Since 2006, associate professor, and since 2012 has been professor of jazz singing at the Norwegian Academy of Music. She is the older sister of the twin sisters Ane Carmen and Ida Roggen from the Norwegian vocal band Pitsj.

== Career ==
Roggen first appeared in the duo Tu'Ba with the tuba player Lars Andreas Haug 1994. She helped start the band Wibutee in 1997–2000, and then was the lead singer of the Norwegian jazz band Come Shine 1998–2004. In 2003–2008, she appeared with their own lyrics and compositions in the Live Band. In 2007, a solo disc Circuit songs which won Spellemannprisen the Norwegian Grammy Award in the Open class.

Since 2004 Roggen has been co-singer and one of the driving forces of the improvisational vocal ensemble Trondheim Voices, for whom she made the compositions. In 2009, Roggen and pianist Helge Lien formed the Norwegian-language duo Live/Lien that performs original music written to texts by Norwegian poets, cover songs and jazz tunes.

In addition to her own bands and groups Roggen have sung with, among other Trondheim Jazz Orchestra, the Norwegian Radio Orchestra, Trondheimsolistene, Bugge Wesseltoft, Tom Steinar Lund & Trio de Janeiro, deLillos and Leieboerne, and she has since 1996 been a backup singer in the group Young Neils. In 2008 and 2009 she participated in four tribute concerts For Radka together with Arild Andersen, Jon Eberson and Jon Christensen, including in the Norwegian National Opera. In 2006–2009 she sang the tango and jazz compositions in the Atle Sponberg and Frode Haltli s La Fuente. She participated in children's records Magiske kroker & hemmeligheter (Egmont 2008) and Go'natt (Jazzland/Universal 2009).

== Honors ==
- 1999: The Norwegian State Scholarship
- 2003: Spellemannprisen 2002 with Come Shine in the class Jazz
- 2003: Kongsberg Jazz Award
- 2003: Radka Toneff Memorial Prize 2003
- 2004: The Gammleng Prize, in the class Jazz
- 2005–2007: The Norwegian State Scholarship
- 2007: Spellemannprisen, in the Open class for record Circuit Songs

== Discography ==
=== Solo albums ===
- 2007: Circuit Songs (Jazzland)
- 2016: Apokaluptein (Kirkelig Kulturverksted), commissioned work for the 2016 Vossajazz

=== LiveLien ===
- 2011: Låvesalg (Jazzland/Universal)
- 2016: YOU (Ozella)

=== Collaborations ===
- 1998: Tu'Ba (Curling Legs), with Tu'Ba
- 1999: Newborn Thing (Jazzland), with Wibutee
- 2001: Come Shine (Curling Legs), with Come Shine
- 2002: Pöck (Bergland Productions), with Dingobats
- 2002: Denne lille pytten er et hav (Curling Legs), with Sverre Gjørvad
- 2002: Do Do That Voodoo (Curling Legs), with Come Shine
- 2003: In Concert (Curling Legs), with Come Shine
- 2007: Følg oss hjem, Ole Paus (Kirkelig Kulturverksted), with Leieboerne
- 2008: Magiske Kroker Og Hemmeligheter (Egmont), with Various artists
- 2009: Go' natt (Jazzland), with Various artists
- 2010: Improvoicing (MNJ Records), with Trondheim Voices
- 2015: Red and Gold (Jazzland), with Come Shine

Awards
| Preceded by Per Jørgensen | Recipient of the Radka Toneff Memorial Award; 2003 | Succeeded by Solveig Slettahjell |
| Preceded by Håkon Kornstad Trio including Paal Nilssen-Love & Mats Eilertsen | Recipient of the Kongsberg Jazz Award; 2003 | Succeeded by Ingebrigt Håker Flaten |
| Preceded by Jacob Young | Recipient of the Jazz Gammleng-prisen; 2004 | Succeeded by Silje Nergaard |
| Preceded by Hanne Hukkelberg | Recipient of the Open class Spellemannprisen; 2007 | Succeeded by Farmers Market |
| Preceded by Håkon Kornstad | Recipient of the Buddyprisen; 2016 | Succeeded by - |
