= Harmen Fraanje =

Dutch jazz pianist and composer

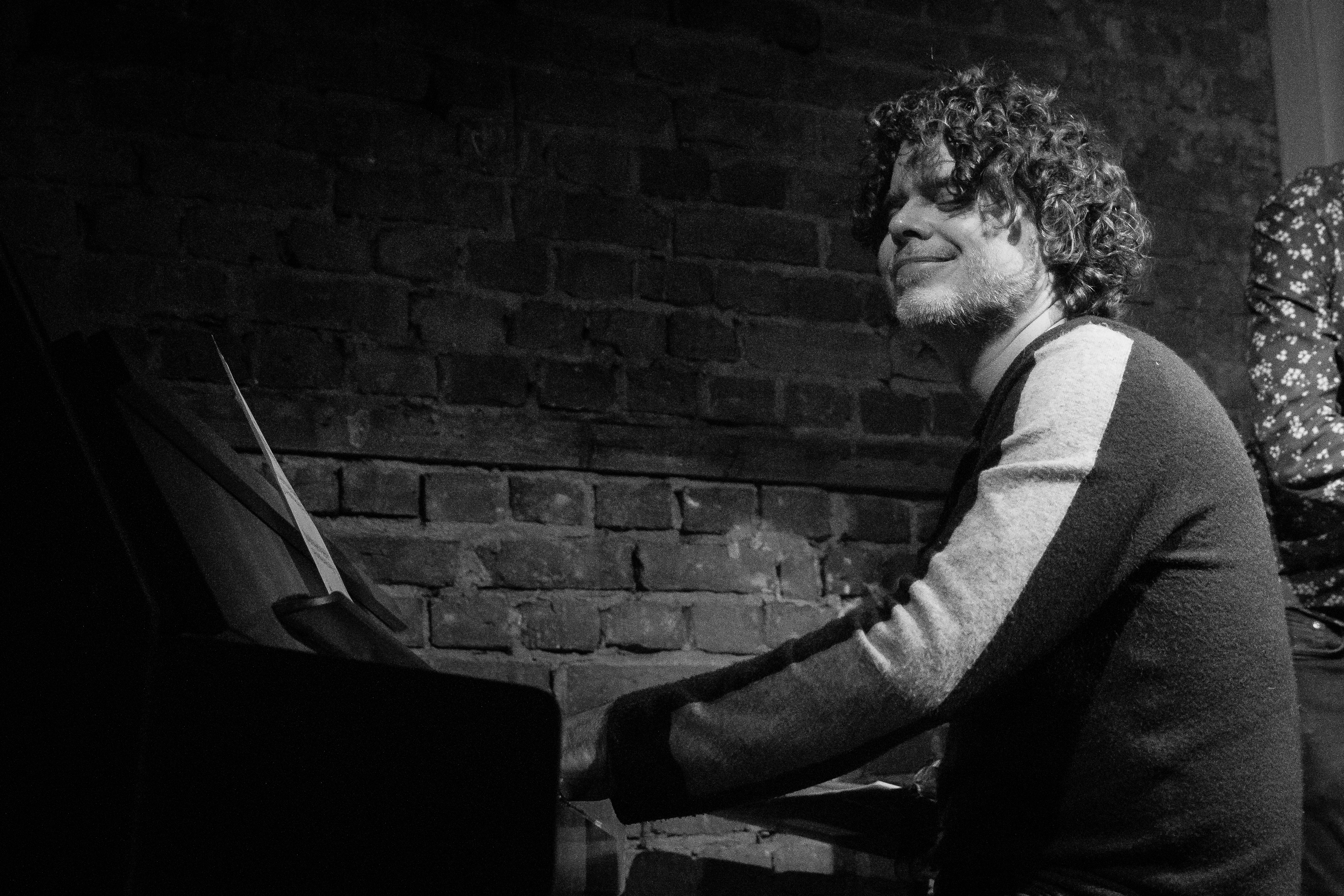
- Harmen Fraanje performing in Norway in 2019

Background information
- Born: 23 January 1976 (age 49); Roosendaal, Netherlands
- Origin: Dutch
- Genres: Jazz
- Occupations: Musician, composer
- Instrument: Piano
- Labels: ECM, Winter & Winter, Challenge Records, Cristal Records
- Website: www.harmenfraanje.com

Harmen Fraanje (born 23 January 1976 in Roosendaal, Netherlands) is a Dutch jazz pianist and composer. He currently lives in Amsterdam.

== Career ==
Harmen Fraanje is a pianist, composer, and educator from the Netherlands, currently based in Amsterdam. He leads and co-leads several projects like his solo project, trio Reijseger Fraanje Sylla, a duo with Norwegian trumpet player Arve Henriksen, a trio with Finnish musicians Aino Peltomaa on voice and Mikko Perkola on viola da gamba and effects, and a quartet with Magic Malik, Brice Soniano and Toma Gouband. These groups mostly perform original works with a lot of space for improvisation.

Harmen is also very active as a sideman in various projects in the European jazz scene, like the Mats Eilertsen Trio, Eric Vloeimans' Fugimundi trio with Anton Goudsmit, and Michael Moore's Fragile Quartet. With these projects, he frequently performs at festivals and concert venues throughout the world. Recordings of the projects he's involved in have been released by renowned record labels like ECM, Winter & Winter, Outhere Music, Hubro Music, Challenge Jazz...

Harmen collaborated with the likes of Ambrose Akinmusire, Mark Turner, Kenny Wheeler, Arve Henriksen, Thomas Morgan, Tony Malaby, Han Bennink, Ernst Reijseger, Trygve Seim, Jesse van Ruller, Magic Malik, Nelson Veras, Theo Bleckmann, Ben Monder, Enrico Rava, Werner Herzog, Trio Mediaeval, Hein van de Geyn, Perico Sambeat, Igor Roma, Louis Moholo, Ferenc Kovács, Rudi Mahall, Cristina Branco.

Harmen is chairman of the Jazz Piano Faculty at the Conservatorium van Amsterdam / University of the Arts Amsterdam. He is also frequently invited to give workshops and masterclasses at other European conservatories.

== Honors ==
- 2004: North Sea Jazz Composition Assignment
- 2005: Harmen's composition Sonatala was included in the Real Book, published by Sheer Music
- 2006: nominated for the Paul Ackett (Bird Award), the most important awards granted by the Jazz Festival of the North Sea.
- 2007: Named VIP 2007 by Dutch Jazz Club.
- 2008: He received the award Prins Bernhard Noord Brabant Cultuurprijs.

== Discography ==
=== Solo albums ===
Within Harmen Fraanje Quartet

- 2004: Sonatala (Challenge Jazz)

Within Harmen Fraanje Quintet

- 2006: Ronja (Challenge Jazz)

Within Harmen Fraanje Trio

- 2010: Avalonia (Challenge Jazz), featuring Michael Moore

=== Collaborations ===
Trio including Eric Vloeimans and Anton Goudsmit

- 2009: Live at Yoshi's (Challenge Jazz)

Within Mats Eilertsen Trio

- 2013: Sails Set (Hubro)
- 2019: And Then Comes The Night (ECM Records)

With Arve Henriksen

- 2024: Touah of Time (ECM Records)
