= Jazzaway Records =

Norwegian record label

- Founded: 2003
- Founder: Jon Klette
- Distributor(s): Northcountry (U.S.), Discovery Records (U.K.)
- Genre: Jazz
- Country of origin: Norway
- Location: Oslo
- Official website: www.jazzaway.com

Jazzaway is a Norwegian record label founded by saxophonist Jon Klette in Oslo, Norway. He is also the main composer/leader in the band Jazzmob. Their CD Pathfinder (2003) was the first release from the label.

The label includes artists and bands such as Crimetime Orchestra, Jazzmob, Morthana, The Core and Sonny Simmons.

== Roster ==
- Anders Aarum
- Bushman's Revenge
- Close Erase
- Dingobats
- Eirik Hegdal
- Jazzmob
- Jon Eberson
- Lucian Ban
- Per Zanussi
- Sam Newsome
- Sonny Simmons
- Svein Olav Herstad
- The Core
- Trondheim Jazz Orchestra

== See also ==
- List of record labels
