= Rune Grammofon albums discography =

The following is a summary of the Rune Grammofon albums. Rune Grammofon is a Norwegian record label.

Cat.no.	Artist	Title	Release date	Format(s)
RCD 2001	Supersilent	1-3	1998-01-12	3CD
RCD 2002	Arne Nordheim	Electric	1998-01-12	CD
RCD 2003	Chocolate Overdose	Whatever	1998-02-23	CD
RCD 2004	Tove Nilsen	Flash Caravan	1998-08-17	CD
RCD 2005	Biosphere & Deathprod	Nordheim Transformed	1998-09-30	CD
RCD 2006	Biosphere, Deathprod & Arne Nordheim	Electric / Transformed	1998-09-30	2CD
RCD 2007	Supersilent	4	1998-11-23	CD
RCD 2008	Furuholmen, Bjerkestrand & Wadling	Hermetic	1999-01-04	CD
RCD 2009	Chocolate Overdose	Dingledoodies	1999-02-15	CD
RCD 2010	SPUNK	Det eneste jeg vet er at det ikke er en støvsuger	1999-02-22	CD
RCD 2011	Alog	Red Shift Swing	1999-08-09	CD
RCD 2012	Various	Love comes shining over the mountains	1999-08-09	CD
RCD 2013	Fartein Valen	The Eternal	2000-01-17	CD
RCD 2014	Jazzkammer	Timex	2000-01-24	CD
RCD 2015	Nils Økland	Straum	2000-03-13	CD
RCD 2016	Phonophani	Genetic Engineering	2001-03-29	CD
RCD 2017	Tore Elgarøy	The Sound Of The Sun	2001-03-29	CD
RCD 2018	Supersilent	5	2001-05-14	CD
RCD 2019	Archetti / Wiget	Low Tide Digitals	2001-05-14	CD
RCD 2020	Alog	Duck-Rabbit	2001-10-22	CD
RCD 2021	Arve Henriksen	Sakuteiki	2001-10-15	CD
RCD 2022	SPUNK	Filtered by Friends	2001-11-26	CD
RCD 2023	Monolight	Free Music	2002-01-14	CD
RCD 2024	Information	Biomekano	2002-03-04	CD
RCD 2025	Raoul Björkenheim, Ingebrigt Håker Flaten & Paal Nilssen-Love	Scorch Trio	2002-03-18	CD
RCD 2026	SPUNK	Den øverste toppen på en blåmalt flaggstang	2002-04-29	CD
RCD 2027	Food	Veggie	2002-09-09	CD
RCD 2028/RLP 3028	Maja Ratkje	Voice	2002-10-21/2013-08-16	CD/LP
RCD 2029/RLP 3029	Supersilent	6	2003-01-20	CD/2LP
RCD 2030	Arne Nordheim	Dodeka	2003-03-17	CD
RCD 2031	Jono El Grande	Fevergreens	2003-09-15	CD
RCD 2032	Various	Money will ruin everything	2003-11-10	Book+2CD
RCD 2033	Skyphone	Fabula	2004-01-12	CD
RCD 2034/RLP 3034	Susanna and the Magical Orchestra	List of Lights and Buoys	2004-01-26/2010-05-31	CD/LP
RCD 2035	Deathprod	Morals and Dogma	2004-02-23	CD
RCD 2036	Deathprod	Deathprod	2004-02-23	4CD
RCD 2037/RLP3037	Arve Henriksen	Chiaroscuro	2004-06-01/2017-05-05	CD
RCD 2038	Phonophani	Oak or Rock	2004-08-30	CD
RCD 2039	Strønen & Storløkken	Humcrush	2004-09-27	CD
RCD 2040/RLP 3040	Scorch Trio	Luggumt	2004-10-11/2006-05-02	CD/2LP
RCD 2041	Food	Last Supper	2004-10-18	CD
RCD 2042	Nils Økland	Bris	2004-11-08	CD
RCD 2043	Alog	Miniatures	2005-01-17	CD
RCD 2044	Shining	In The Kingdom Of Kitsch You Will Be A Monster	2005-01-24	CD
RCD 2045	In The Country	This Was The Pace Of My Heartbeat	2005-03-07	CD
RCD 2046	Archetti / Wiget	Low Tide Digitals II	2005-05-23	CD
RDV 2047	Supersilent	7	2005-09-26	DVD
RCD 2048	SPUNK	En Aldeles Forferdelig Sykdom	2005-11-07	CD
RCD 2049	MoHa!	Raus Aus Stavanger	2006-01-16	CD
RLP 2050	Various	Until Human Voices Wake Us And We Drown	2006-04-24	5x10" in box
RCD 2051	Thomas Strønen	Pohlitz	2006-01-23	CD
RCD 2052/RLP 3052	The White Birch	Come Up For Air	2006-04-24	CD/LP
REP 2053	Deathprod	6-track	2006-04-24	10"
RCD 2054	Phonophani	Phonophani	2006-05-22	CD
RCD 2055	Humcrush	Hornswoggle	2006-05-29	CD
RCD 2056	Svalastog	Woodwork	2006-08-07	CD
RCD 2057	Susanna and the Magical Orchestra	Melody Mountain	2006-08-14	CD
RCD 2058	Huntsville	For The Middle Class	2006-10-09	CD
RCD 2059	In The Country	Losing Stones, Collecting Bones	2006-11-06	CD
RCD 2060	Shining	Grindstone	2007-01-29	CD
RLP 3060	Shining	Shining (In the Kingdom of Kitsch You Will Be a Monster + Grindstone)	2008-03-10	2LP
RCD 2061	Arve Henriksen	Strjon	2007-02-26	CD
RCD 2062	Opsvik & Jennings	Commuter Anthems	2007-03-26	CD
RCD 2063/RLP 3063	Alog	Amateur	2007-04-23/2007-05-14	CD/2LP
RCD 2064/RLP 3064	MoHa!	Norwegianism	2007-05-21/2007-05-25	CD/LP
RCD 2065/RLP 3065	Ultralyd	Conditions For A Piece Of Music	2007-05-21/2007-05-25	CD/LP
RCD 2066	Susanna	Sonata Mix Dwarf Cosmos	2007-08-20	CD
RCD 2067	Supersilent	8	2007-09-17	CD
RCD 2068	Ole-Henrik Moe	Ciaccona/3 Persephone Perceptions	2007-10-01	2CD
RCD 2069	Food	Molecular Gastronomy	2007-11-12	CD
RCD 2070/RLP 3070	Box	Studio 1	2008-01-10/2008-01-14	CD/LP
RCD 2071	Skyphone	Avellaneda	2008-02-18	CD
RCD 2072	Various	Money Will Ruin Everything 2	2008-02-18	Book+2CD
RCD 2073/RLP 3073	Motorpsycho	Little Lucid Moments	2008-03-31	CD/2LP
RCD 2074/RLP 3074	Scorch Trio	Brolt!	2008-04-21	CD/2LP
RCD 2075/RLP 3075	Elephant9	Dodovoodoo	2008-05-26	CD/LP
RSI 2076	MoHa!	Jeff Carey's MoHa!	2008-06-02	7"
RCD 2077	Hilde Marie Kjersem	A Killer For That Ache	2008-08-11	CD
RCD 2078/RLP 3078	MoHa!	One-way Ticket To Candyland	2008-09-01/2008-09-08	CD/LP
RCD 2079	Huntsville	Eco, Arches & Era	2008-09-22	2CD
RCD 2080/RLP 3080	Susanna	Flower Of Evil	2008-10-20/2008-12-15	CD/2LP
RCD 2081/RLP 3081	Humcrush	Rest At Worlds End	2008-12-01/2008-12-08	CD/2LP
RCD 2082/RLP 3082	The Low Frequency In Stereo	Futuro	2009-01-12	CD/LP
RCD 2083/RLP 3083	Bushman's Revenge	You Lost Me At Hello	2009-02-16	CD/LP
RCD 2084/RLP 3084	Jono El Grande	Neo Dada	2009-03-16/2009-03-23	CD/LP
RCD 2085	SPUNK	Kantarell	2009-04-20	CD
RCD 2086/RLP 3086	In The Country	Whiteout	2009-05-25	CD/2LP
RCD 2087	Archetti / Wiget	Low Tide Digitals III	2009-06-29	CD
RLP 2088	Motorpsycho	Child of the Future	2009-08-07	LP
RCD 2089	Circulasione Totale Orchestra	Bandwidth	2009-11-02	3CD
RCD 2090/RLP 3090	Susanna and the Magical Orchestra	3	2009-08-24/2009-11-16	CD/2LP
RCD 2091/RLP 3091	Fire!	You Liked Me Five Minutes Ago	2009-08-10	CD/LP
RCD 2092	Supersilent	9	2009-10-05	CD
RCD 2093/RLP 3093	Motorpsycho	Heavy Metal Fruit	2010-01-15/2010-01-18	CD/2LP
RSI 2094	Motorpsycho	X-3 (Knuckleheads in Space)	2010-02-22	7"
RCD 2095/RLP 3095	Elephant9	Walk the Nile	2010-02-22	CD/LP
RCD 2096	Espen Eriksen Trio	You Had Me At Goodbye	2010-03-08	CD
RCD 2097/RLP 3097	Bushman's Revenge	Jitterbug	2010-04-26	CD/LP
RCD 2098/RLP 3098	Puma	Half Nelson Courtship	2010-05-25	CD/LP
RCD 2099/RLP 3099	Stian Westerhus	Pitch Black Star Spangled	2010-05-25	CD/LP
RCD 2100/RLP 3100	Various	Twenty Centuries Of Stony Sleep	2010-09-20	CD/2LP
RLP 3100X	Various	Twenty Centuries Of Stony Sleep (Box set)	2010-09-27	2LP+12"+CD
RCD 2101/RLP 3101	Phonophani	Kreken	2010-06-21	CD/10"+CD
RCD 2102/RLP 3102	Supersilent	10	2010-08-23/2010-11-22	CD/LP
RCD 2103/RLP 3103	Supersilent	11	2014-09-19/2010-09-27	LP
RCD 2104/RLP 3104	Scorch Trio	Melaza	2010-10-25	CD/LP
RCD 2105/RLP 3105	Ultralyd	Inertiadrome	2010-10-18	CD/LP
RCD 2106/RLP 3106	Jono El Grande	Phantom Stimulance	2010-12-06	CD/LP
RCD 2107/RLP 3107	Phaedra	The Sea	2011-01-24	CD/LP
RCD 2108/RLP 3108	Jenny Hval	Viscera	2011-02-18	CD/2LP
RCD 2109/RLP 3109	The Last Hurrah!!	Spiritual Non-believers	2011-03-25	CD/LP
RCD 2110/RLP 3110	Motorpsycho	Roadwork Vol. 4 - Intrepid Skronk	2011-04-08	CD/2LP
RCD 2111/RLP 3111	Fire! with Jim O'Rourke	Unreleased?	2011-05-20	CD/LP
RDV 2112	SPUNK	Light	2011-05-27	DVD
RCD 2113/RLP 3113	In The Country	Sounds and Sights	2011-05-24/2011-06-24	CD+DVD/2LP+CD+DVD
RCD 2114	Humcrush with Sidsel Endresen	Ha!	2011-08-19	CD
RCD 2115/RLP 3115	Hedvig Mollestad Trio	Shoot!	2011-09-23	CD/LP
RCD 2116/RLP 3116	Alog	Unemployed	2011-11-11/2011-11-14	CD/4LP
RCD 2117	Albatrosh	Yonkers	2011-10-21	CD
RLP 2118	Elephant9	Live at the BBC	2011-11-09	LP
RLP 2119	Scorch Trio with Mars Williams	Made in Norway	2011-11-09	2LP
REP 2120	Fire! with Jim O'Rourke	Released!	2011-11-09	10"
REP 2121	The Last Hurrah!!	The Great Gig In Disguise	2011-11-09	10"
RCD 2122/RLP 3122	El Doom & The Born Electric	El Doom & The Born Electric	2012-01-06	CD/2LP
RCD 2123/RLP 3123	Bushman's Revenge	A Little Bit of Big Bonanza	2012-01-20	CD/LP
RCD 2124/RLP 3124	Motorpsycho and Ståle Storløkken	The Death Defying Unicorn	2012-02-10	2CD/2LP
RLP 2125	Bushman's Revenge	Never Mind the Botox	2012-01-20	LP
RCD 2126	Astrïd	High Blues	2012-03-02	CD
RCD 2127/RLP 3127	Volcano the Bear	Golden Rhythm / Ink Music	2012-03-02	CD/LP
RCD 2128	Susanna	Wild Dog	2012-03-16	CD
RCD 2129/RLP 3129	Espen Eriksen Trio	What Took You So Long	2012-05-04	CD/2LP
RCD 2130	Fire! with Oren Ambarchi	In the Mouth a Hand	2012-05-11	CD/2LP
RCD 2131	Sidsel Endresen & Stian Westerhus	Didymoi Dreams	2012-06-08	CD
RSI 2132	El Doom & The Born Electric	The Teeth That Match My Wounds	2012-05-11	7"
RCD 2133	Stian Westerhus	The Matriarch And The Wrong Kind Of Flowers	2012-08-17	CD
RCD 2134/RLP 3134	Elephant9 + Reine Fiske	Atlantis	2012-09-07	CD/2LP
RCD 2135/RLP 3135	Panzerpappa	Astromalist	2012-10-12	CD/LP
RCD 2136/RLP 3136	Colin Stetson & Mats Gustafsson	Stones	2012-09-11	CD/LP
RLP 2137	Arve Henriksen	Solidification	2013-02-15	7LP
RCD 2138/RLP 3138	Fire! Orchestra	Exit!	2013-01-11	CD/LP
RCD 2139/RLP 3139	Grand General	Grand General	2013-02-01	CD/LP
RCD 2140	SPUNK	Das Wohltemperierte Spunk	2013-02-15	6CD
RCD 2141/RLP 3141	Hedvig Mollestad Trio	All Of Them Witches	2013-03-15	CD/LP
RCD 2142/RLP 3142	Jenny Hval	Innocence is Kinky	2013-04-19	CD/LP
RCD 2143/RLP 3143	Motorpsycho	Still Life With Eggplant	2013-04-12	CD/LP
RLP2144	Bushman's Revenge	Electric Komle - Live!	20-04-2013	LP/LP+7"
RCD 2145/RLP 3145	The Last Hurrah!!	The Beauty Of Fake	07-06-2013	CD/LP
RCD 2146/RLP 3146	Fire!	Without Noticing	2013-08-16	CD/LP
RCD 2147/RLP 3147	Arve Henriksen	Places Of Worship	2013-09-06	CD
RCD 2148/RLP 3148	James Plotkin & Paal Nilssen-Love	Death Rattle	2013-10-18	CD/LP
RCD 2149/RLP 3149	Evan Parker & Joe McPhee	What/If/They Both Could Fly	2013-10-18	CD/LP
RLP 2150	Various	Sailing To Byzantium	2013-12-06	4x10"
RCD 2151/RLP 3151	Bushman´s Revenge	Thou Shalt Boogie!	2013-11-23	CD/LP
RCD 2152/RLP 3152	Arve Henriksen	Chron + Cosmic Creation	2014-01-10	2CD/LP/LP
RLP 2153	Fire! Orchestra	Second Exit	2014-01-10	LP
RCD 2154/RLP 3154	Krokofant	Krokofant	14-02-2014	CD/LP
RCD 2155/RLP 3155	Motorpsycho	Behind The Sun	2014-03-07	CD/2LP
RCD 2156/RLP 3156	Stian Westerhus & Pale Horses	Maelstrom	2014-03-28	CD/2LP
RCD 2157/RLP 3157	Hedvig Mollestad Trio	Enfant Terrible	2014-04-11	CD/LP
RCD 2158/RLP 3158	Fire! Orchestra	Enter	2014-05-30	CD/2LP
RCD 2159/RLP 3159	Sten Sandell & Paal Nilssen-Love	Jacana	2014-05-30	CD/LP
RBK 2160	J. Rød	Free Jazz And Improvisation On Vinyl 1965-1985	2014-07-11	Book
RCD 2161/RLP 3161	Arve Henriksen	The Nature Of Connections	2014-08-22	CD/LP
RCD 2162	Supersilent	12	2014-09-19	CD
RCD 2163	SPUNK	Adventura Botanika	2014-10-17	CD
RCD 2164/RLP 3164	Sidsel Endresen & Stian Westerhus	Bonita	2014-11-07	CD/LP
RCD 2165/RLP 3165	Albatrosh	Night Owl	2014-11-07	CD/LP
RCD 2166/RLP 3166	Detail	First Detail	2015-02-06	CD/LP
RSI 2167	Fire!	Det flygande barnet	2015-02-06	7"
RSI 2168	The Last Hurrah!!	The Weight of the Moon	2015-02-27	7"
RCD 2169/RLP 3169	Anneli Drecker	Rocks & Straws	2015-04-24	CD/LP
RLP 2170	Motorpsycho + Ståle Storløkken	En Konsert For Folk Flest	2015-04-17	2LP+CD+DVD
RCD 2171/RLP 3171	The Last Hurrah!!	Mudflowers	2015-05-15	CD/LP
RCD 2172/RLP 3172	Phaedra	Blackwinged Night	2015-06-16	CD/LP
RCD 2173/RLP 3173	Espen Eriksen Trio	Never Ending January	2015-08-28	CD/LP
RCD 2174/RLP 3174	Elephant9 with Reine Fiske	Silver Mountain	2015-08-21	CD/2LP
RCD 2175/RLP 3175	Jono El Grande	Melody Of A Muddled Mason	2015-10-02	CD/LP
RCD 2176/RLP 3176	Motorpsycho	Supersonic Scientists	2015-10-16	2CD/2LP
RCD 2177/RLP 3177	Krokofant	Krokofant II	2015-11-13	CD/LP
RCD 2178/RLP 3178	Fire!	She Sleeps, She Sleeps	2016-01-15	CD/LP
RCD 2179/RLP 3179	Motorpsycho	Here Be Monsters	2016-02-12	CD/LP
RSI 2180	Motorpsycho	Spin, Spin, Spin	2016-02-05	7"
RCD 2181/RLP 3181	Maja S. K. Ratkje	Crepuscular Hour	2016-03-18	CD+DVD/2LP+CD+DVD
RCD 2182/RLP 3182	Fire! Orchestra	Ritual	2016-04-29	CD/2LP
RCD 2183/RLP 3183	Hedvig Mollestad Trio	Black Stabat Mater	2016-06-03	CD/LP
RLP 2184	Hedvig Mollestad Trio	Evil In Oslo	2016-06-03	2LP
RCD 2185/RLP 3185	Bushman's Revenge	Jazz, Fritt Etter Hukommelsen	2016-09-02	CD/LP
RLP 2186	Bushman's Revenge	Bushman´s Fire	2016-09-02	LP
RLP 2187	Scorch Trio	XXX	2016-10-14	4LP
RCD 2188	SPUNK	Still Eating Ginger Bread For Breakfast	2016-11-11	CD
RCD 2189/RLP 3189	Krokofant	Krokofant III	2017-02-17	CD/LP
RCD 2190/RLP 3190	Irabagon, Hegre & Drønen	Axis	2017-02-17	CD/LP
RCD 2191/RLP 3191	Anneli Drecker	Revelation for Personal Use	2017-03-31	CD/LP
RCD 2192/RLP 3192	Arve Henriksen	Towards Language	2017-05-05	CD/LP
RLP 2193	Motorpsycho	Begynnelser	2017-06-09	2x10"+CD+DVD
RCD 2194/RLP 3194	Various	Sky Music: A Tribute to Terje Rypdal	2017-08-25	CD/2LP/3LP Box
RLP 2195	Various	Sky Music: A Tribute to Terje Rypdal Vol. 2	2017-08-25	LP
RCD 2196/RLP 3196	Kjetil Mulelid Trio	Not Nearly Enough to Buy a House	2017-10-27	CD/LP
RCD 2197/RLP 3197	Fire!	The Hands	2018-01-26	CD/LP
RCD 2198/RLP 3198	Elephant9	Greatest Show on Earth	2018-02-16	CD/LP
RCD 2199/RLP 3199	Espen Eriksen Trio with Andy Sheppard	Perfectly Unhappy	2018-05-04	CD/LP
RBK 2200	Various	Let´s Put It To Music: 20 Years Of Rune Grammofon	2018-11-30	Book+7"
RCD 2201/RLP 3201	Arve Henriksen with Eivind Aarset, Jan Bang and Jez Riley French	The Height of the Reeds	2018-08-31	CD/LP
RCD 2202/RLP 3202	The Last Hurrah!!	Los Angeles	2018-10-12	CD/LP
RCD 2203/RLP 3203	Hedvig Mollestad Trio	Smells Funny	2018-11-30	CD/LP
RCD 2204/RLP 3204	Maja S. K. Ratkje	Sult	2019-03-08	CD/LP
RCD 2205/RLP 3205	Fire! Orchestra	Arrival	2019-05-24	CD/2LP
RCD 2206/RLP 3206	Elephant9	Psychedelic Backfire	2019-05-31	CD/2LP
RCD 2207/RLP 3207	Elephant9 with Reine Fiske	Psychedelic Backfire II	2019-05-31	CD/2LP
RCD 2208/RLP 3208	Kjetil Mulelid Trio	What You Thought Was Home	2019-08-30	CD/LP
RCD 2209/RLP 3209	Krokofant with Ståle Storløkken and Ingebrigt Håker Flaten	Q	2019-09-27	CD/LP
RLP 3210	Arve Henriksen	The Timeless Nowhere	2019-11-01	4LP
RCD 2211/RLP 3211	Ivar Grydeland and Henry Kaiser	In the Arctic Dreamtime	2020-01-24	CD/LP
RCD 2212/RLP 3212	Fire! Orchestra	Actions	2020-02-28	CD/LP
RCD 2213/RLP 3213	Master Oogway	Earth and Other Worlds	2020-04-17	CD/LP
RCD 2214/RLP 3214	I Like to Sleep	Daymare	2020-04-17	CD/LP
RCD 2215/RLP 3215	Hedvig Mollestad Trio	Ekhidna	2020-06-12	CD/LP
RCD 2216/RLP 3216	Espen Eriksen Trio	End of Summer	2020-09-25	CD/LP
RCD 2217/RLP 3217	Fire!	Defeat	2021-02-12	CD/LP
RCD 2218/RLP 3218	Elephant9	Arrival of the New Elders	2021-02-12	CD/LP
RCD 2219/RLP 3219	Hedvig Mollestad Trio	Ding Dong. You're Dead	2021-03-19	CD/LP
RCD 2220/RLP 3220	Kjetil Mulelid	Piano	2021-03-12	CD/LP
RCD 2221/RLP 3221	Sex Magick Wizards	Your Bliss My Joy	2021-09-10	CD/LP
RCD 2222/RLP 3222	Krokofant with Ståle Storløkken and Ingebrigt Håker Flaten	Fifth	2021-09-10	CD/LP
RCD 2223/RLP 3223	Hedvig Mollestad	Tempest Revisited	2021-11-19	CD/LP
RCD 2224/RLP 3224	Master Oogway with Henriette Eilertsen	Happy Village	2022-03-25	CD/LP
RCD 2225/RLP 3225	Action & Tension & Space	Tellus	2022-03-25	CD/LP
REP 2226	Fire! with Stephen O'Malley and David Sandström	Requiēs	2022-06-03	12"
RCD 2227	Espen Eriksen Trio with Andy Sheppard	In the Mountains	2022-04-29	CD
RCD 2229	Kjetil Mulelid trio	Who Do You Love the Most?	2022-04-29	CD
RCD 2230/RLP 3230	I Like to Sleep	Sleeping Beauty	2022-06-03	CD/LP

Rune Arkiv
Cat.no.	Artist	Title	Release date	Format
RACD 101	Fra Lippo Lippi	The Early Years	2003-03-03	CD
RACD 102	Fra Lippo Lippi	The Best Of	2003-03-03	CD
RACD 103	Fra Lippo Lippi	Songs	2005-10-31	CD
RACD 104	Motorpsycho	Timothy's Monster	2009-10-08	4CD
RACD 105	Fra Lippo Lippi	Fra Lippo Lippi	2011-08-26	4CD
RACD 106	MoHa!	Meiningslaust Oppgulp (a singles compilation)	2011-07-11	CD
RACD 107	Jono El Grande	The Choko King	2011-11-25	CD
RACD 108	Deathprod	Treetop Drive	2011-11-04	CD
RACD 109	Deathprod	Imaginary Songs From Tristan Da Cunha	2011-11-04	CD
RACD 110	Motorpsycho	Blissard	2012-11-23	4CD
RACD 111	Shining	Shining (In the Kingdom of Kitsch You Will Be a Monster + Grindstone)	2014-04-04	2CD
RACD 112	Motorpsycho	Demon Box	2014-12-05	4CD+DVD/2LP
RALP 313	Tom Prehn Quartet	Axiom	2016-10-14	LP
RACD 114	Motorpsycho	Angels and Daemons at Play	2016-12-02	6CD
