= Kvitretten =

Norwegian vocal group

- Origin: Trondheim, Norway
- Genres: Jazz & Vocal music
- Years active: 1991–2001
- Labels: Curling Legs
- Members: Eldbjørg Raknes; Kjersti Stubø; Tone Åse; Anna Sundström; Hans Jørgen Støp; Kristin Asbjørnsen; Solveig Slettahjell
- Website: jagajazzist.com

Kvitretten (1991-2001 in Trondheim, Norway) was a Norwegian vocal group, known for improvisation and a cappella music releases, concerts, television shows, and international tours.

== Biography ==
Kvitretten was initially comprising arranger and composer Eldbjørg Raknes, Kjersti Stubø (91-97), Tone Åse, Anna Sundström (91-94) and Hans Jørgen Støp (91-95). They were to be found at the festival «Nordlyd» 1993 with the commissioned work Ro u ro by Elin Rosseland, composer supported by Rikskonsertene. After some replacements, Raknes, Stubø, Åse and Kristin Asbjørnsen released the debut album Voices (1996) with lyrics by Raknes and Sidsel Endresen. They collaborated on the commissioned work Hysj by Lars Martin Myhre for «Vestfoldspillene» 1997, with a record released in 1997, as well as on Vintersang (1998) by Odd Børretzen, and received Norsk Kulturråd's ensemble support 1997–99.

With Solveig Slettahjell replacing Stubø they released Everything turns (1999). Twenty-six texts by poet Torgeir Rebolledo Pedersen were performed as a commissioned work for Moldejazz 2000, and released on the album Kloden er en snurrebass som snurrer oss (2001). After touring in Germany, farewell concerts were held 2000–01.

Their music and arrangements have besides Raknes, been composed by Jon Balke, Elin Rosseland, Vigleik Storaas, Christian Wallumrød and Ståle Storløkken.

== Discography ==
=== As Trondheim Voices ===
- 1996: Voices (Curling Legs)
- 1999:Everything Turns (Curling Legs)
- 2002: Kloden er en snurrebass som snurrer oss (Curling Legs), lyrics by the poet Torgeir Rebolledo Pedersen

=== As backing ===
- 1997: Hysj (Tylden & Co.), with Lars Martin Myhre
- 1998: Vintersang (), with Odd Børretzen
