= Blindheim (surname) =

Blindheim is a surname. Notable people with the surname include:

- Charlotte Blindheim (1917–2005), Norwegian archaeologist
- Oddbjørn Blindheim (born 1944), Norwegian jazz pianist and dentist
- Svein Blindheim (1916–2013), Norwegian military officer
- Svein Olav Blindheim (born 1954), Norwegian jazz double bassist, composer and writer
