= Kjetil Mulelid =

Norwegian jazz pianist and composer (born 1991)

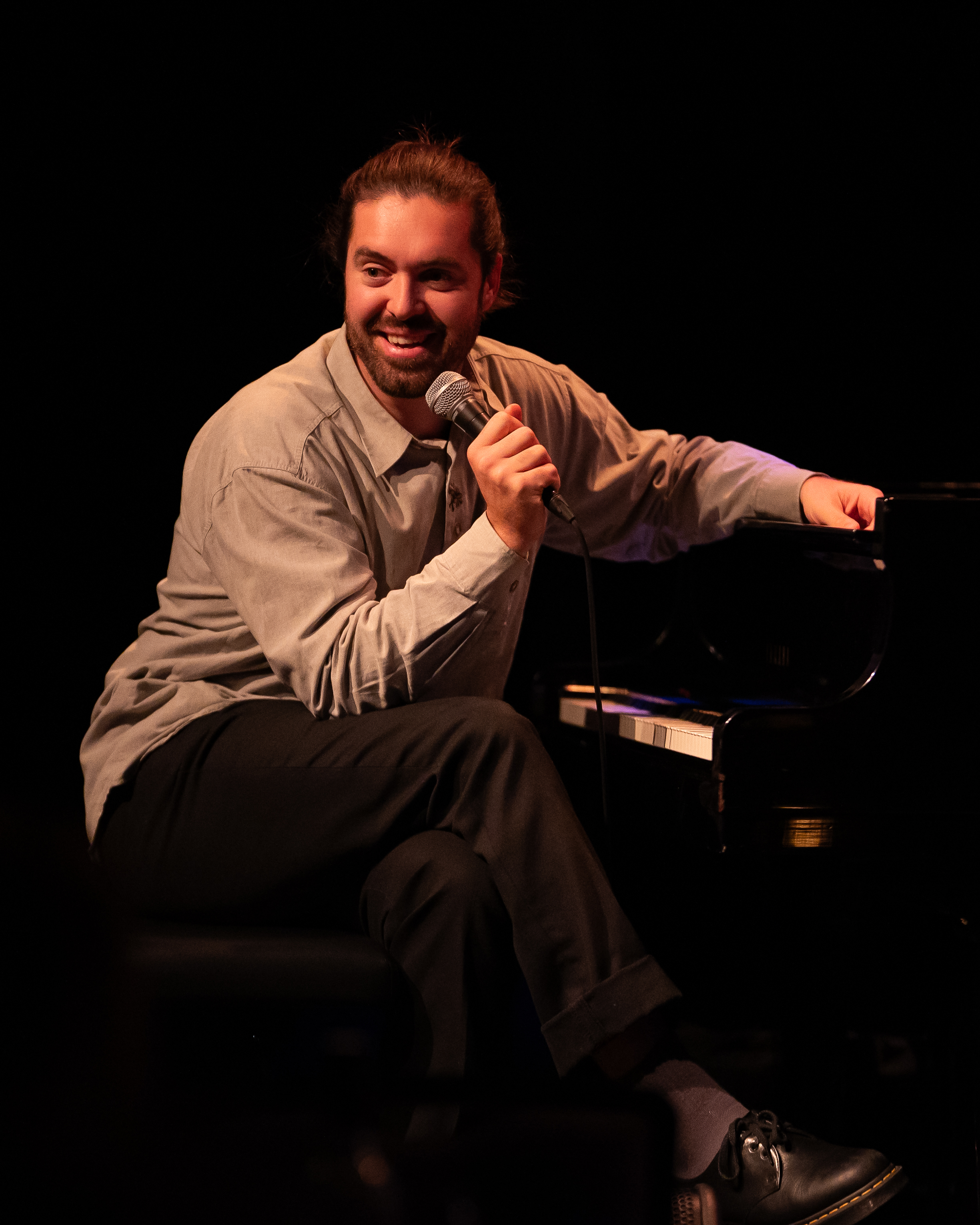
- Mulelid in 2025

Background information
- Born: 4 February 1991 (age 35); Hurdal, Akershus
- Origin: Norway
- Genres: Jazz
- Occupations: Musician, composer
- Instrument: Piano
- Labels: Rune Grammofon, Øra Fonogram
- Website: www.kjetilmulelid.com

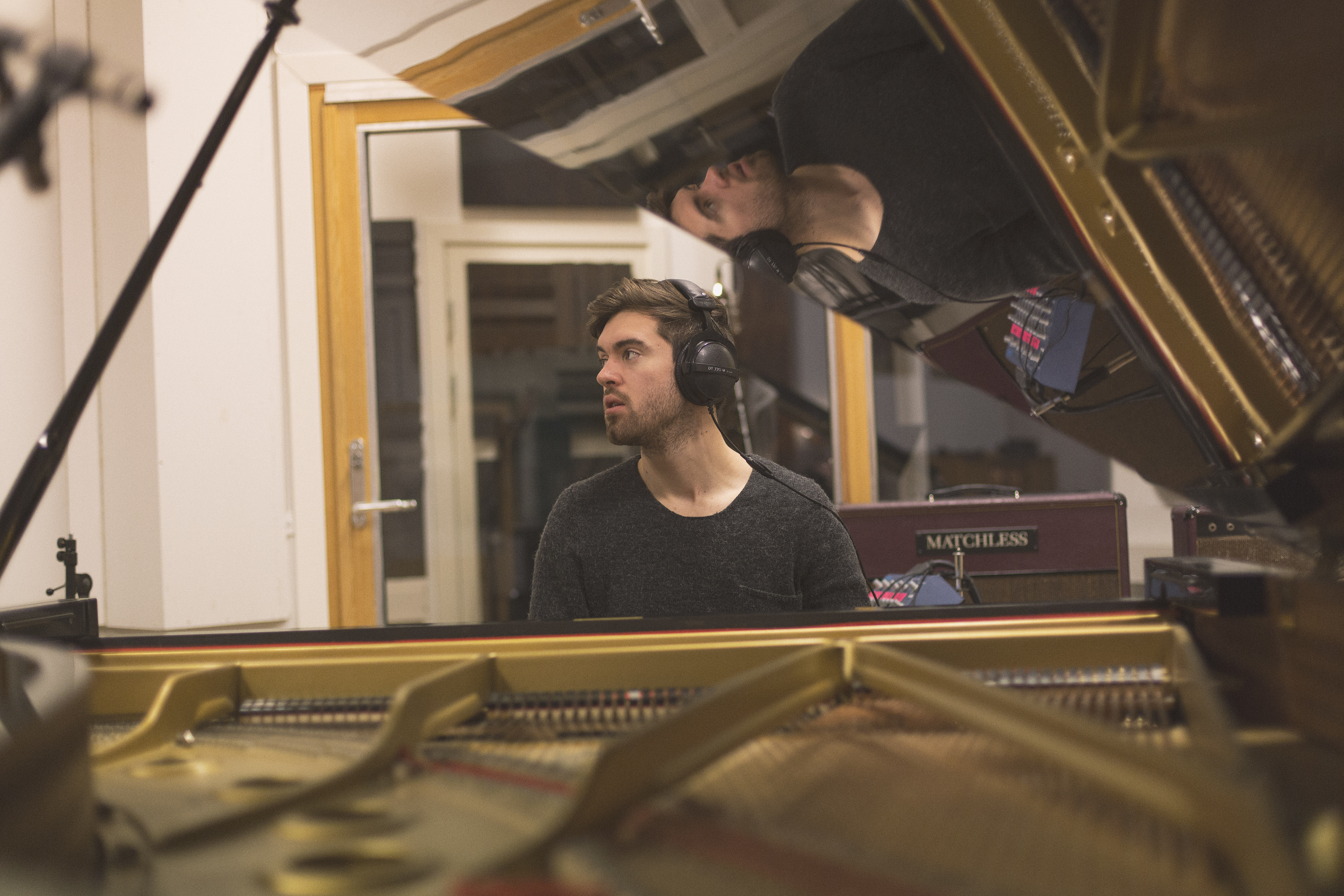
Photo by Henrik Fjørtoft, 2014

Kjetil André Mulelid (born 4 February 1991 in Hurdal, Norway) is a Norwegian jazz pianist and composer known from his own work with Kjetil Mulelid Trio, Kjemilie and Wako, and from collaborations with musicians like Siril Malmedal Hauge, Arve Henriksen, and Trygve Seim.

As a composer, his music has been described as energetic, rhythmically intricate, harmoniously rich, intimate and with appealing melodies.

== Biography ==
In 2014, Mulelid completed his studies at the Jazz program at Norwegian University of Science and Technology in Trondheim, and has thereafter been active with bands like Kjemilie, Wako, and a number of others.

Kjetil Mulelid Trio released their debut album Not Nearly Enough To Buy A House in 2017. The trio, consisting of Mulelid with bassist Bjørn Marius Hegge and drummer Andreas Skår Winther, is in the same musical landscape as In The Country and Espen Eriksen Trio, with youthful playfulness and curiosity. The trio has toured in most of Central Europe. After three albums, Hegge stepped away from the trio because of tinnitus issues, and since 2025, Rune Nergaard has taken over on bass.

== Discography ==
=== Solo ===
- 2021: Piano (Rune Grammofon)

=== Kjetil Mulelid Trio ===
- 2025: And Now (Grappa/Musikkoperatørene)
- 2022: Who Do You Love the Most?
- 2019: What You Thought Was Home (Rune Grammofon)
- 2017: Not Nearly Enough To Buy A House (Rune Grammofon)

=== Wako ===
- 2021: Live in Oslo (Øra Fonogram)
- 2020: Wako (Øra Fonogram)
- 2018: Urolige sinn (Øra Fonogram)
- 2017: Modes For All Eternity (AMP Music & Records)
- 2015: The Good Story (Øra Fonogram)

=== Kjemilie (duo with singer Emilie Storaas) ===
- 2017: Bakkekontakt (Øra Fonogram)
- 2016: Hverdagene (Øra Fonogram)

=== with Siril Malmedal Hauge ===
- 2021: Slowly, Slowly (Jazzland)
- 2019: Uncharted Territory (Jazzland)

=== with Fieldfare ===
- 2017: Fieldfare (Øra Fonogram)

=== with Lauv ===
- 2013: De Som Er Eldre Enn Voksne (ABC Studio)
