= Neo-Dada (disambiguation) =

Neo-Dada was an art movement.

Neo-Dada may also refer to:

- Neo-Dada Organizers, a Japanese art collective
- Neo Dada (album), 2009 album by Jono El Grande
