= Bjørn Marius Hegge =

Norwegian jazz musician and composer (born 1987)

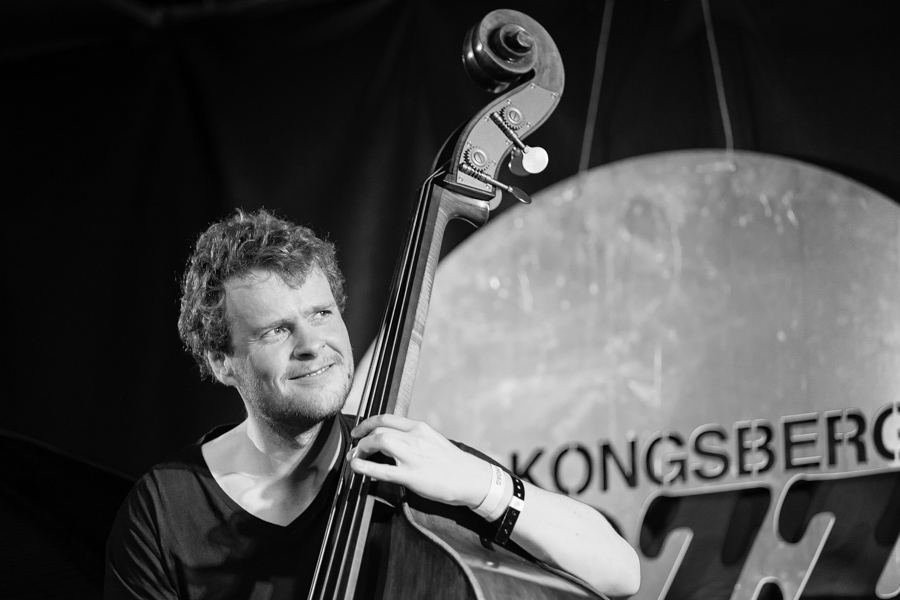
- Bjørn Marius Hegge performing at Kongsberg Jazzfestival in 2019

Background information
- Born: 11 September 1987 (age 38); Stjørdal Municipality, Nord-Trøndelag
- Origin: Norway
- Genres: Jazz
- Occupations: Musician, composer
- Instruments: Upright bass, guitar
- Website: www.bjornmariushegge.com

Bjørn Marius Hegge (born 11 September 1987 in Elvran, Stjørdal Municipality) is a Norwegian jazz musician (upright bass and guitar) and composer.

== Biography ==
Hegge completed his studies on the Jazz program at Norwegian University of Science and Technology in Trondheim, giving the exam concert with drummer Hans Hulbækmo and pianist Oscar Grönberg in 2016. While still a student he led his band Operasjon Hegge joined by former fellow students Martin Myhre Olsen, Petter Kraft, Simon Olderskog Albertsen, and Torstein Lavik Larsen, releasing his debut album Midt På Natta (2016) on the label Particular Recordings. He also collaborated in the Kjetil Mulelid Trio, including with drummer Andreas Skår Winther, releasing the album Not Nearly Enough To Buy A House (2017), What You Thought Was Home (2019) and Who Do You Love The Most (2022) on the label Rune Grammofon.

In 2016 Hegge started his quintet Hegge joined by Jonas Kullhammar (tenor saxophone), Martin Myhre Olsen (alto and soprano saxophones), Vigleik Storaas (piano) and Håkon Mjåset Johansen (drums). They released the albumet Vi Är Ledsna Men Du Får Inte Längre Vara Barn in 2017 and was awarded the Spellemannprisen in the jazz category.

== Honors ==
- 2017: Spellemannprisen in the category Jazz, for the album Vi Är Ledsna Men Du Får Inte Längre Vara Barn.

== Discography ==
=== Solo albums ===
With Operasjon Hegge

- 2016: Midt På Natta (Particular Recordings)

With Hegge

- 2017: Vi Är Ledsna Men Du Får Inte Längre Vara Barn (Particular Recordings)

=== Collaborations ===
With Kjetil Mulelid Trio

- 2017: Not Nearly Enough To Buy A House (Rune Grammofon)
- 2019: What You Thought Was Home
- 2022: Who Do You Love The Most?

Awards
Preceded by Nils Petter Molvær	Recipient of the jazz Spellemannprisen; 2017	Succeeded by -
