= 5 (Supersilent album) =

Live album by Supersilent
- Released: May 14, 2001
- Recorded: February 7, 1999–November 16, 2000
- Genres: Free improvisation, electronic
- Length: 70:53
- Labels: Rune Grammofon (RCD 2018)
- Producer: Deathprod

Supersilent chronology
4 (1998)	5 (2001)	6 (2003)

Professional ratings
Review scores
Source	Rating
Allmusic	4/5 stars

5 is a live album by Supersilent, released on May 14, 2001 through Rune Grammofon.

== Track listing ==
All music is composed by Supersilent.

No.	Title	Length
1.	"5.1"	19:45
2.	"5.2"	11:17
3.	"5.3"	13:48
4.	"5.4"	8:25
5.	"5.5"	17:38

== Personnel ==
Supersilent

- Arve Henriksen – trumpet, live electronics
- Helge Sten – live electronics, production, mixing, recording
- Ståle Storløkken – keyboards
- Jarle Vespestad – drums

Production and additional personnel

- Kim Hiorthøy – cover art
- Audun Strype – mastering, recording
