= Henrik Lødøen =

Norwegian jazz drummer (born 1991)

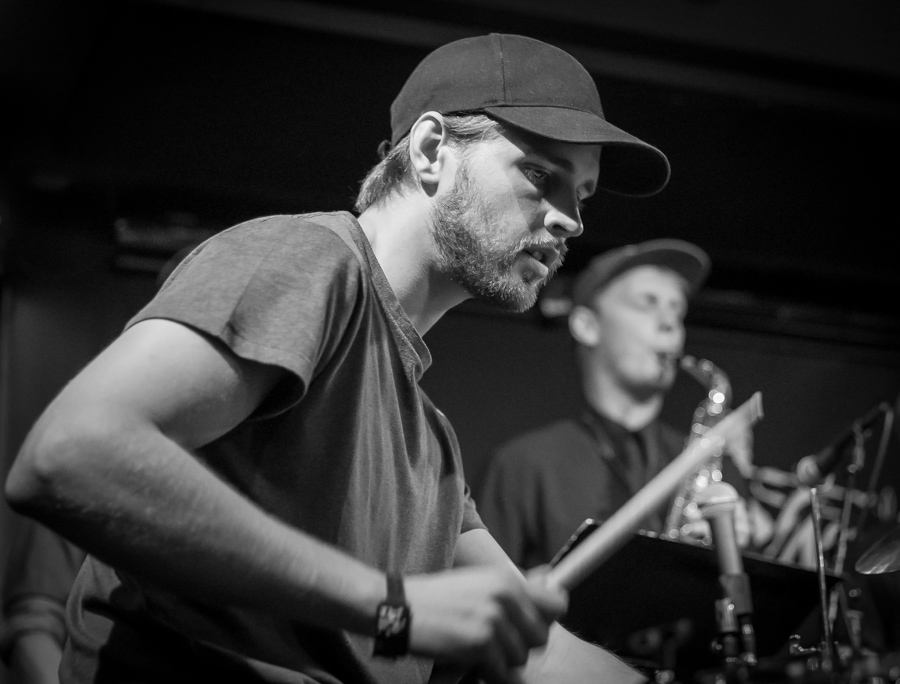
- Lødøen with Megalodon Collective at Herr Nilsen during the 2016 Oslo Jazzfestival.

Background information
- Born: Henrik Drabløs Lødøen; 20 October 1991 (age 34); Brattvåg, Sunnmøre
- Origin: Norway
- Genres: Jazz
- Occupations: Musician, composer
- Instrument: Drums

Henrik Drabløs Lødøen (born 20 October 1991 in Brattvåg, Norway) is a Norwegian jazz drummer.

== Career ==
Lødøen got his diploma from the jazz program at the Norwegian University of Science and Technology in 2015. In Trondheim he started collaborations with a number of the upcoming young Norwegian and Swedish jazz musicians. Among them are Megalodon Collective, Stig Ulv, DRØM, Rohey, Ósk and Les Casanovas.

== Honors ==
- 2016: Winner of Jazzintro at the 2016 Moldejazz with Megalodon Collective
- 2016: Nominated for best jazz album at Spellemann (Norwegian grammys) with Megalodon Collective
- 2018: Nominated for best newcomer of the year at Spellemann (Norwegian grammys) with Rohey

== Discography ==
Med Megalodon Collective

- 2015: Megalodon (Gigafon Records)
- 2017: Animals (Jazzland Recordings)
- 2019: The Triumph (Jazzland Recordings)

Med Rohey

- 2017: A Million Things (Jazzland Recordings)

Med Siril Malmedal Hauge

- 2019: Uncharted Territory (Jazzland Recordings)
- 2021: Slowly, slowly (Jazzland Recordings)

Med Rikke Normann

- 2021: the art of letting go (RikkiLeaks)

Med Louien

- 2019: None of My Words (Jansen Records)

Med Mosambique

- 2019: Big City Moves (Jazzland Recordings)

Med Jul på Sunnmørsk

- 2018: Jul på Sunnmørsk (Dugnad Rec)

Med Stein Helge Solstad

- 2018: Elvane Møtast

Med DRØM

- 2017: Drømmen Om Oss (Vilje)

Med Lillebror

- 2017: Lillebror (Alf Prøysen-viser) (Grappa)

Med Stig Ulv

- 2012: Strengetonar (Self-release)
- 2013: Klimprar (Self-release)

Med Circuit of Values

- 2012: Digital (Self-release)
