= BOL (band) =

Norwegian jazz/electronica band

- Origin: Trondheim, Norway
- Genres: Jazz, electronica
- Years active: 1995–present
- Labels: Via Music, Curling Legs, NorCD, Gigafon
- Members: Tone Åse; Ståle Storløkken; Tor Haugerud
- Past members: Tor Yttredal
- Website: www.bol.no

BOL (initiated 1995 in Trondheim, Norway) is a Norwegian experimental jazz and electronica band in a quartet/trio format, known for performances and releases in the borderline between jazz, noise and electronica.

BOL consisted originally of Tone Åse vocals and musical director, Ståle Storløkken (keyboards and piano), Tor Yttredal (saxophone) and Tor Haugerud (drums).

The new trio format (Yttredal left the band around 2000) they made (mainly Storløkken) the commissioned work «Interference harmony» for Trondheim Kammerfestival 2003. They also appeared on the Varangerfestivalen 2006.

== Discography ==
- 2001: BOL (Via Music)
- 2005: Silver sun (Curling Legs), with their own lyrics and compositions, and some texts by Olav H. Hauge
- 2007: Skylab (NorCD)
- 2012: Numb, Number (Gigafon), with Westerhus / Snah
