= Veslefrekk =

Norwegian jazz band

- Origin: Trondheim, Norway
- Genres: Jazz
- Years active: 1989-1997, 2004
- Label: NorCD
- Spinoffs: Supersilent
- Members: Ståle Storløkken; Arve Henriksen; Jarle Vespestad

Veslefrekk (established 1989 in Trondheim, Norway) was a Norwegian Jazz band, consisting of Ståle Storløkken (keyboards), Arve Henriksen (vocal and trumpet), and Jarle Vespestad (drums). They started in the academic environment of the Jazz program at the Trondheim Musikkonservatorium. Their debut album was Veslefrekk (1994), and they also took part in The Seventh Mute, part of the "Jazz from Norway" series. Moreover, they contributed on commissions to Vossajazz 1995.

After the concert Veslefrekk with DEATHPROD (Nattjazz, 1997), the trio transformed into the quartet Supersilent, where Helge Sten (also known as Deathprod) contributed effects he had picked up when collaborating with Motorpsycho. Supersilent has released several albums on Rune Grammofon.

In 2004 the trio Veslefrekk was back with the melodic album release Valse Mysterioso and participated on "Trondheim Jazz Festival".

== Discography ==
- 1994: Veslefrekk (NorCD)
- 2004: Valse Mysterioso (NorCD)
