= This Is Not a Miracle =

This is Not a Miracle

Studio album by Food
- Released: November 20, 2015
- Recorded: June 2013
- Studios: Holand Sound; Oslo, Norway
- Genres: Jazz, Experimental
- Length: 47:26
- Labels: ECM; ECM 2417

Food chronology
Mercurial Balm (2012)	This is Not a Miracle (2015)

This is Not a Miracle is an album by experimental group Food recorded in June 2013 and released on ECM in November 2015.

== Reception ==
Professional ratings
Review scores
Source	Rating
AllMusic	4/5 stars
All About Jazz	4/5 stars
The Guardian	3/5 stars
PopMatters	8/10 stars

AllMusic awarded the album 4 stars and the review by Thom Jurek states "The album is the most groove-driven, performable, and accessible record in Food's catalog."

All About Jazz reviewers said, "expect the unexpected. Strønen's production process distills the band's improvisational flights into compact pieces—not quite conventional tunes, but almost" and "This is Not a Miracle is not a miracle, in fact. What it is however, is another mindful collection of compositions that look at jazz music with an open mind and equally open process."

The Guardian's John Fordham said "The album belongs more to Strønen than Food’s previous recordings, and it’s none the worse for that."

PopMatters' John Garratt said "This Is Not a Miracle is the result of the heavy editing and thankfully the process has not diluted the power that Food have displayed in the past... Food, as usual, give us the tastiest of both worlds on another quiet winner that lives up to the ECM name."

In JazzTimes, Steve Greenlee wrote "This Is Not a Miracle is dreamy, effervescent and constantly shifting—waves bobbing on oceans, tree limbs swaying in breezes. Rarely has the marriage of acoustic and electronic seemed so natural."

Observer selected it as one of the 10 Best Jazz albums of 2015 noting "these guys not only have an advanced creative aptitude in the slipstream between laptop technology and acoustic instrumentation, but an uncanny sense of groove to boot."

== Track listing ==
All compositions by Thomas Strønen.

1. "First Sorrow" – 3:05
2. "Where Dry Desert Ends" – 4:18
3. "This Is Not a Miracle" – 4:08
4. "The Concept of Density" – 2:55
5. "Sinking Gardens of Babylon" – 4:22
6. "Death of Niger" – 3:43
7. "Exposed to Frost" – 3:27
8. "Earthly Carriage" – 6:55
9. "Age of Innocence – 4:27
10. "The Grain Mill" – 4:59
11. "Without the Laws" – 5:07

== Personnel ==
- Thomas Strønen – drums, electronics, percussion, Moog synthesizer, Fender Rhodes electric piano
- Iain Ballamy – saxophones, electronics
- Christian Fennesz – guitar, electronics
