= 4 (Supersilent album) =

Studio album by Supersilent
- Released: November 23, 1998
- Recorded: Audio Virus Lab 15 in Oslo, Norway
- Genres: Free improvisation, electronic
- Length: 49:20
- Labels: Rune Grammofon (RCD 2007)
- Producer: Supersilent

Supersilent chronology
1-3 (1998)	4 (1998)	5 (2001)

Professional ratings
Review scores
Source	Rating
Allmusic	3/5 stars

4 is the second album by Supersilent, released on January 12, 1998, through Rune Grammofon.

== Track listing ==
All music is composed by Supersilent.

No.	Title	Length
1.	"4.1"	6:17
2.	"4.2"	9:07
3.	"4.3"	10:02
4.	"4.4"	1:28
5.	"4.5"	2:31
6.	"4.6"	17:49
7.	"4.7"	2:06

== Personnel ==
Supersilent

- Arve Henriksen – trumpet, live electronics
- Helge Sten – live electronics, production, mixing, recording
- Ståle Storløkken – keyboards
- Jarle Vespestad – drums

Production and additional personnel

- Kim Hiorthøy – cover art
- Audun Strype – mastering
- Supersilent – production
