= Humcrush =

Norwegian jazz band

- Origin: Trondheim, Norway
- Genres: Jazz and electronica
- Years active: 2004–present
- Label: Rune Grammofon
- Members: Ståle Storløkken; Thomas Strønen
- Website: Puma official Website

Humcrush (established 2004 in Trondheim) is a Norwegian experimental jazz band initiated by Thomas Strønen and Ståle Storløkken.

Humcrush present futuristic electro-jazz, mixing hyper electronics, bleats of analogue keyboards and skittering live drums to great effect. The two musicians manage to take their varied influences and create a melange that, with a determination and sense of resolve, demonstrates how music can work on many levels. It is the sense of pulling ideas out of the ether and developing them into miniature pieces with an inner logic and sense of continuity that makes these nine improvisations so compelling.

Humcrush has been collaborating a couple years with singer Sidsel Endresen, delivering a particularly strong set at the 2011 Oslo Jazz Festival. But it was their 2010 show at Switzerland's Willisau Jazz Festival that provided the perfect grist for Ha! (2011).

== Band members ==
- Ståle Storløkken – keyboards
- Thomas Strønen – drums & electronics

== Discography ==
- 2004: Humcrush (Rune Grammofon)
- 2008: Rest At Worlds End (Rune Grammofon), Quartet
- 2011: Ha! (Rune Grammofon), with Sissel Endresen
