= Lars Martin Myhre =

Norwegian composer, guitarist and pianist (1956–2024)

Lars Martin Myhre (10 August 1956 – 28 December 2024) was a Norwegian composer, guitarist, pianist, singer and record producer residing in Sandefjord. He was best known for his collaboration with Odd Børretzen, but for more than 30 years was involved in the musical life of Norway and released a dozen albums, participated in or produced albums for other artists and composed film music, musicals and theater music. He was successful in a variety of music genres such as jazz, show and classical music.

== Life and career ==
Myhre was born on 10 August 1956. At the start of his career he was an active jazz musician. For one he started Slagen Big Band in 1977 and was conductor of the band for 10 years. With the SBB, he released the album Bak speilet with lyrics by Jens Bjørneboe in 1984. From 1980 until 1993, he was musical director for the group Friteater Thesbiteateret. In this period he wrote music to more than twenty plays and two musicals, namely Nattklubben in 1987 and Oppdagelsen av Columbus together with Odd Børretzen in 1992.

He wrote music for feature films Henrys bakværelse directed by Gianni Lepre in 1982 and Prinsen av Fogo directed by Inge Tenvik in 1987, and the documentary Å seile sin egen sjø of Øyvind Sandberg in 2002. He has also written music for several short films and commissioned films.

In 1981, he started the successful collaboration with Odd Børretzen and together they have released three albums. Their first album Noen ganger er det all right which appeared in 1995, was less than 98 weeks VG-lista and has sold about 150,000 copies. It is the first album out of a trilogy. The duo have been rewarded with Spellemannprisen four times, including one-time prize ever Norwegian hit for the song Noen ganger er det all right. At the same time Myhre had a project of his own.

In the 1980s, he started a partnership with the poet and singer Arild Nyquist. The collaboration resulted among others in the group Trio Tre where Svein Olav Blindheim was the third person. They released the album Kalde øl og heite jenter (Cold beer and hot girls) in 1985 and I sans og samling (In a stupor) in 1999. When Myhre composed the work Havet – reise til verdens ende (Sea – travel to the end of the world) his starting point was the poem Havet by Nyquist. The work was premiered at Vestfoldspillene in 1993.

To the Vestfoldspillene in 1997, he created the commissioned work Hysj together with the poet Gro Dahle. Hysj was also released on a record with the Danish Jazz trumpeter Palle Mikkelborg as soloist, and published in both Norwegian version and English by the name Hush. In addition to Mikkelborg, renowned jazz musicians like Joanna Foster, Jonathan Guy Lewis and Kvitretten participated. The album was nominated to Spellemannprisen the following year.

In 2001, Myhre released the album 10 sanger where he set music to poems by, among others Ingvar Hovland and Jens Bjørneboe. Basically he wanted to find different vocalists to sing the different songs, but ended up singing all of them himself. The collaboration with Hovland continued and in 2006 with the album Stengetid? ten lyrical pieces by Hovland.

Myhre died on 28 December 2024, at the age of 68.

== Awards and honors ==
- Urijazzprisen 1984
- Sem Sparebanks Culture Prize 1985
- Vestfold fylkeskommunes Kunstnerpris 1989
- First prize NOPA/NRK summer song competition 1995 for En sommer er aldri over (with lyricist Louis Jacoby)
- Spellemannprisen 1996 in the class song of the Year for «Noen ganger er det all right» (with Odd Børretzen)
- Spellemannprisen 1997 in the class folk rock for the album Vintersang (with Odd Børretzen)
- Kardemomme grant NOPA 1999
- Tidenens norske hit under Spellemannprisen 2001 for Noen ganger er det all right (with Odd Børretzen)
- Årets Norsktopplåt 2001 for «Deja-vu» (from 10 sanger')
- Sandefjord municipal Culture Prize 2002
- Spellemannprisen 2002 in the class folk songs for the album Kelner! (with Odd Børretzen)
- Gammleng-prisen 2005 i klassen viser

== Discography ==
- Søstrene (EMREC, 1983), single, with Slagen Storband. Lyrics by Jens Bjørneboe
- Bak speilet (Hot Club Records, 1984) sammen med Slagen Storband. Tekster av Jens Bjørneboe
- Kalde øl og heite jenter (Tunsberg, 1985) Trio Tre album
- Slemme Lars og noen andre (Tunsberg, 1987), children's music, with Arild Nyquist og Svein Olav Blindheim
- Sanger fra ei kjerre (1992) with Thesbiteateret
- Noen ganger er det all right (Tylden, 1995) sammen med Odd Børretzen
- Vintersang (Tylden, 1997) with Odd Børretzen
- Hysj (Tylden, 1997)
- I sans og samling (Tylden, 1999) Trio Tre album
- Hush (1999) Engelish version of Hysj
- 10 Sanger (Tylden, 2001)
- Kelner! (Tylden, 2002) with Odd Børretzen
- Fra øverste hylle (Tylden, 2004) with Odd Børretzen – compilation
- Stengetid? (Tylden, 2006)
- Syv sørgelige sanger og tre triste (2008) with Odd Børretzen
- Sibelius' åttende – eller så langt vi har reist for å komme til kort (Bigbox / Sony Music, 2011)
- Hans Majestet (Gramofon, 2016)

== See also ==
- Music of Norway
