= 1–3 =

Studio album by Supersilent
- Released: January 12, 1998
- Studio: Audio Virus Lab 15 and Athletic Sound in Norway
- Genre: Free improvisation, electronic
- Length: 188:20
- Label: Rune Grammofon (RCD 2001)
- Producer: Deathprod

Supersilent chronology
1–3 (1998)	4 (1998)

Professional ratings
Review scores
Source	Rating
Allmusic	4/5 stars

1–3 is the debut album of Supersilent, released on January 12, 1998, through Rune Grammofon.

== Track listing ==
All music is composed by Supersilent

Disc one
No.	Title	Length
1.	"1.1"	29:01
2.	"1.2"	5:08
3.	"1.3"	14:02
4.	"1.4"	15:52

Disc two
No.	Title	Length
1.	"2.1"	13:46
2.	"2.2"	9:26
3.	"2.3"	5:28
4.	"2.4"	6:28
5.	"2.5"	27:09

Disc three
No.	Title	Length
1.	"3.1"	9:58
2.	"3.2"	7:11
3.	"3.3"	24:48
4.	"3.4"	20:03

== Personnel ==
Supersilent

- Arve Henriksen – trumpet, live electronics
- Helge Sten – live electronics, production, mixing, recording
- Ståle Storløkken – keyboards
- Jarle Vespestad – drums

Production and additional personnel

- Kai Ø. Andersen – recording
- Ellen Ane Eggen – photography
- Audun Strype – mastering
