= Tone Åse =

Norwegian jazz vocalist and keyboardist

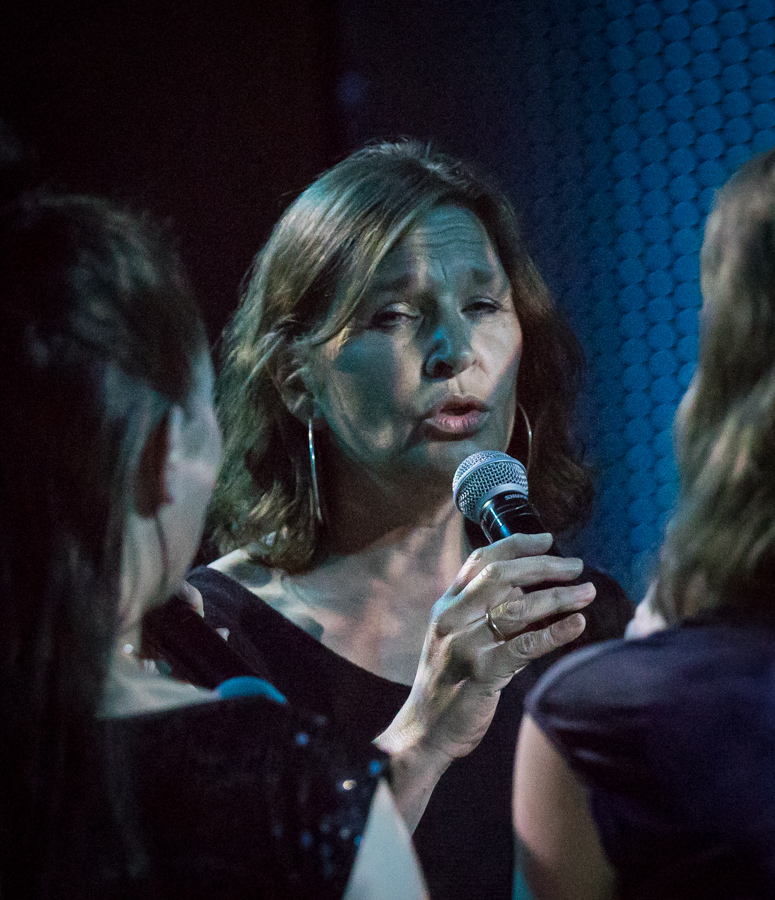
- Åse performing in 2017

Background information
- Born: 24 February 1965 (age 61); Bergen, Norway
- Genres: Jazz
- Occupations: Musician, composer
- Instrument: Vocals
- Labels: Gigafon Records; Curling Legs
- Member of: BOL
- Formerly of: Kvitretten
- Website: www.toneaase.no

Tone Åse (born 24 February 1965 in Bergen, Norway) is a Norwegian singer, known from Norwegian choirs and jazz scenes. She is married to, and musically cooperating with jazz keyboardist Ståle Storløkken.

== Career ==
After completing teacher education, she studied classical vocals at the Trondheim Musikkonservatorium and Tromsø Musikkonservatorium, and got a master's degree on the Jazz program at Trondheim Musikkonservatorium (2007), where she is still working as an assistant professor.

Åse joined Kvitretten (1991) and contributed to two records with Kristin Asbjørnsen, Solveig Slettahjell, and Eldbjørg Raknes which she still are cooperating with. She took over the lead of Sosialistisk Kor in Trondheim (1994), and is also involved with Trondheim Voices. She has performed with Trondheim Jazz Orchestra. She has also contributed in Live Maria Roggens «Liveband» (2006), and with Ingrid Storholmen she performed «Samtalen» at Olsokdagene (2006)

She leads the quartet BOL with her husband Ståle Storløkken (piano), Tor Yttredal (saxophone) and Tor Haugerud (drums) with the album Silver sun (2001). They appeared as a trio when Yttredal left the band, and composed the commission work for Trondheim Kammerfestival (2003). They performed at Varangerfestivalen (2006).

Åse is in the new lineup with Marilyn Mazur's Future Song.

== Discography ==
=== Solo albums ===
Within «Tone Åse & Thomas Strønen Duo»

- Voxpheria (Gigafon Records, 2012)

Within BOL

- BOL (Via Music, 2001)
- Silver Sun (Curling Legs, 2005)
- Skylab (Nor CD, 2008)
- Numb, Number (Gigafon Records, 2012)

=== Collaborative works ===
Within Kvitretten

- Voices (Curling Legs, 1996)
- Everything Turns (Curling Legs, 1999)
- Kloden Er En Snurrebass Som Snurrer Oss (Curling Legs, 2002), with Torgeir Rebolledo Pedersen (Reciting)
