= Thomas Strønen =

Norwegian jazz drummer (born 1972)

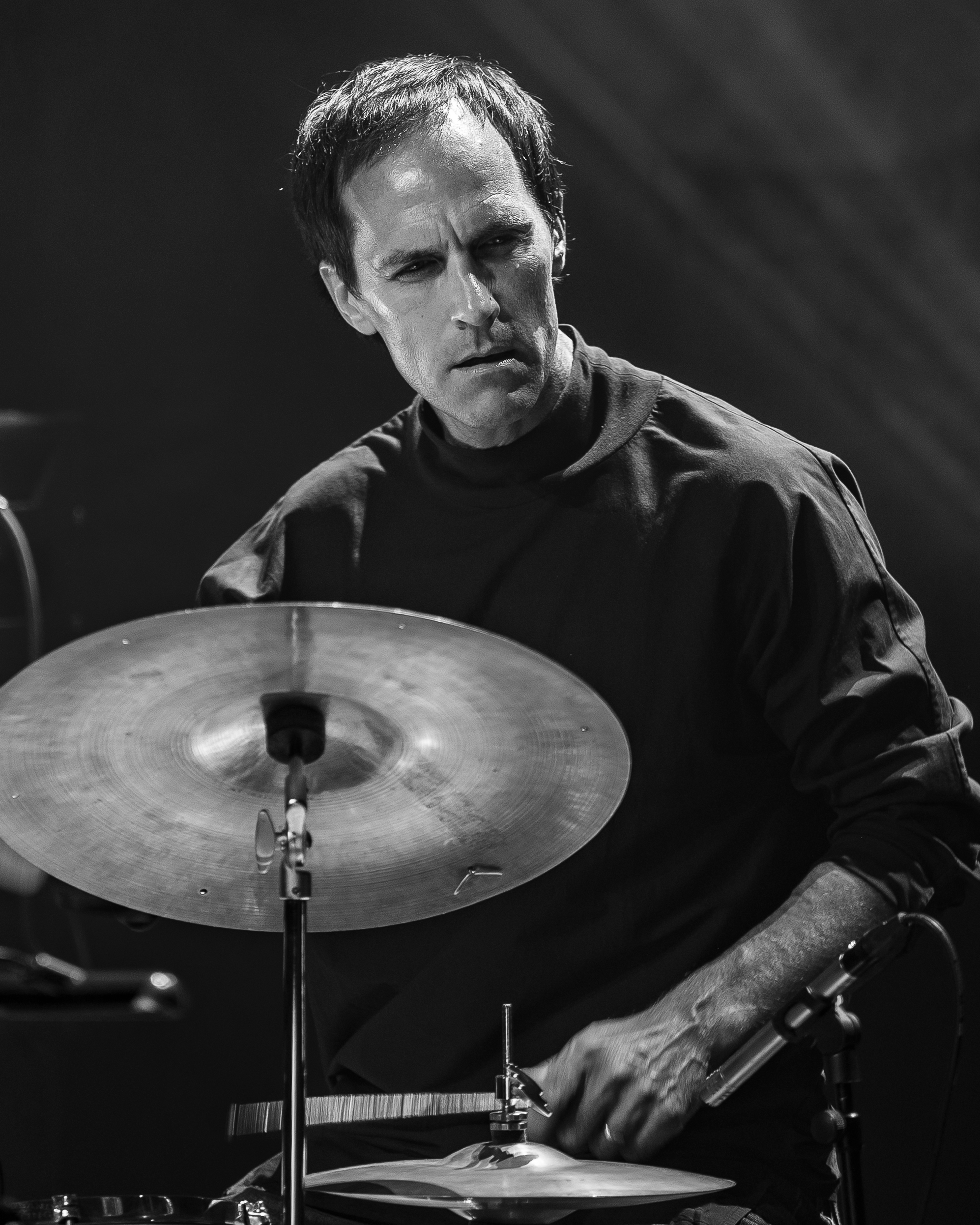
- Strønen in 2025

Background information
- Born: 7 December 1972 (age 53); Oslo, Norway
- Genre: Jazz
- Occupations: Musician, composer
- Instrument: Drums

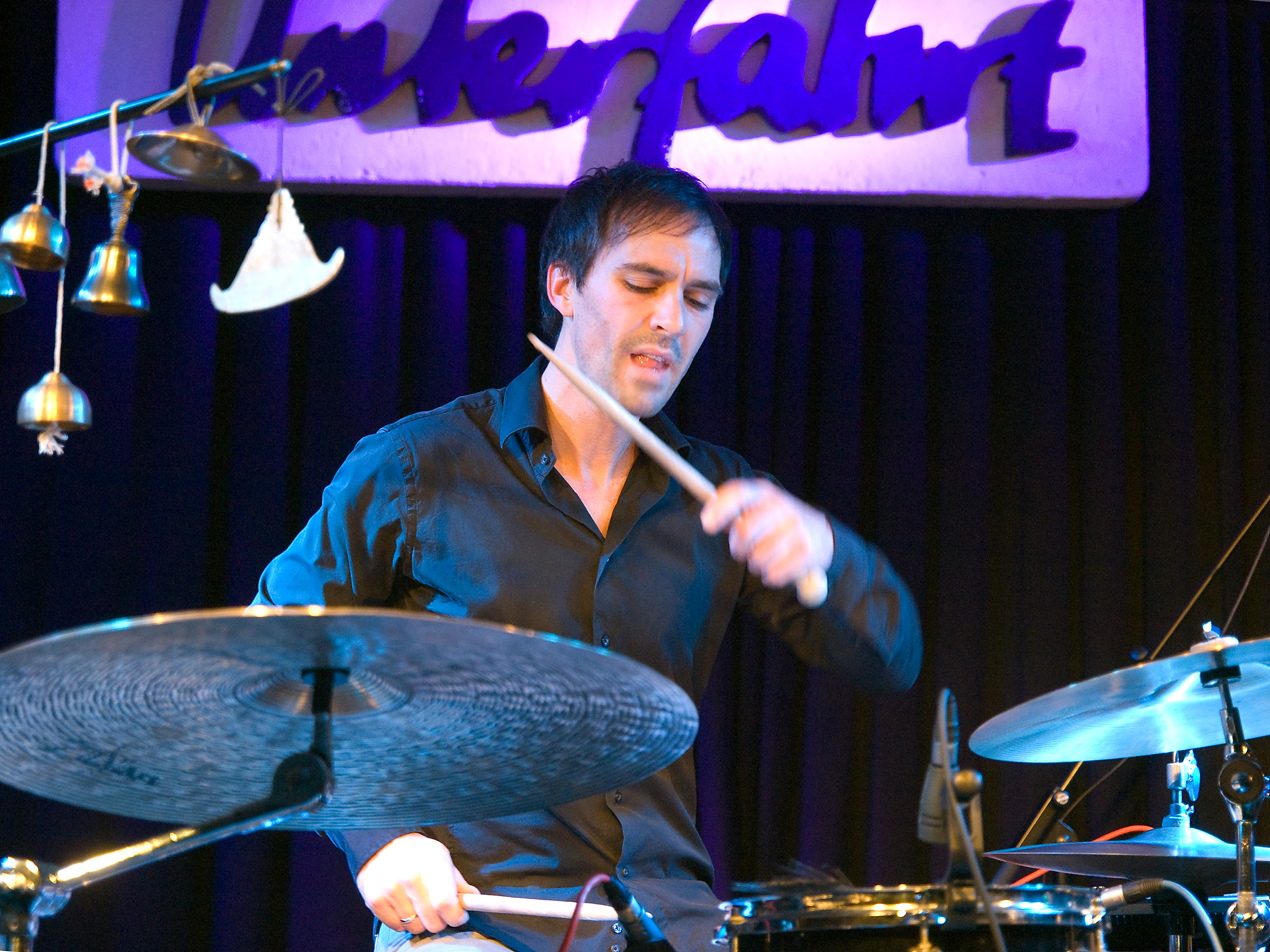
Strønen at Jazz Club Unterfahrt, Munich, 2010

Thomas Pohlitz Strønen (born 7 December 1972) is a Norwegian jazz drummer who has recorded more than 80 albums. He has worked with Joe Lovano, Craig Taborn, Micah Thomas, Eivind Opsvik, Iain Ballamy, Arve Henriksen, Mats Eilertsen, Eivind Aarset, Christian Fennesz, Nils Petter Molvaer, Bobo Stenson, John Taylor, Tore Brunborg, Morten Qvenild, Ingebrigt Håker Flaten, Sidsel Endresen, Bugge Wesseltoft, Tomasz Stanko, Koichi Makigami, Ernst Reijseger, Nils-Olav Johansen, and Stian Carstensen.

== Career ==
Strønen attended the Jazz Program at Trondheim Musikkonservatorium (1995–1999). He has participated in the following bands; Pohlitz (solo project), Humcrush with Ståle Storløkken and occasionally Sidsel Endresen, Food with Iain Ballamy and sometimes Christian Fennesz and the Swedish-Norwegian band Parish with Bobo Stenson, Mats Eilertsen trio (with Harmen Fraanje) Meadow with the British pianist John Taylor and Tore Brunborg. Furthermore, he plays with Maria Kannegaard Trio, Reflections in Cosmo (feat. Ståle Storløkken, Kjetil Møster, Hans Magnus "Snah" Ryan), Time Is A Blind Guide (feat. Ayumi Tanaka, Ole Morten Vågan, Leo Svensson Sander and Håkon Aase), Trinity and Turanga. He has also made several commissioned works, and produced and arranged works for a variety of artists. Strønen is also an associate professor at Norges Musikkhøgskole.

Strønen is recording for the renowned German label ECM and also for Rune Grammofon. As a composer, Strønen has contributed to the release of over seventy recordings as well as several commissioned works for festivals (including the Bath and Cheltenham Jazz Festival and Ultima Contemporary Music Festival) and radio (DR, BBC, Deutsche Rundfunk, NRK, BBC, Swedish Radio, and others).

== Composer of commissioned works ==
- Gildeskål-stevnet 1999, with the poet Tristan Vindthorn, performed at Ørnes July 1999, by the musicians Håvard Lund, Håvard Bendiksen and Ole Marius Sandberg
- Cheltenham Jazzfestival 1999, with Iain Ballamy, performed by the band Food
- Bath Jazzfestival 2000, with Iain Ballamy, Arve Henriksen, performed by the band Food
- Dølajazz 2000, with Tomasz Stanko, Christian Wallumrød, Håkon Kornstad, Johan Bertling
- Music for the percussion ensemble Bad Valley Drums (30 minutes of music) in 2001, 2002 and 2003
- Music for the Ultima Festival, 2003 (for 6 percussionists)
- Music for Parish 2004 recording for ECM (6 compositions)
- Music for solo percussion and sampler for Nattjazz, (30 minutes of music) in 2004.
- Music for solo percussion and sampler for Edinburgh Jazz Festival, (30 minutes of music) in 2004.
- Exquisite Pain (Utsøgt Smerte) – Sophie Calle. Music for theatre in København, Århus and Odense.
- Time is a blind guide – Commission for Conexions 2013, NRK/ BBC. (National Jazzscene)
- Badnajazz 2013. Commission for 25 drummers, saxophone (Tore Brunborg), elektronics and video.
- Winner of composition contest "Klangen av Kilden" (sound for Kilden)- sounds for the concert house Kilden (Kristiansand).
- Commission for drum ensemble and saxophone (8 drummers), 60min, 5. Oktober 2012.
- Urban X. Music for dance- performance (30min) for The Norwegian Opera, 2011.
- Commission for 7 drummers, Cosmopolite and Victoria in 2010, 74 min.
- Commission (Food) for Cheltenham Jazzfestival, 2010.
- Film- music for TV2, Sneglehuset, 2009.
- Commission, strings and drums – celebration of Edvard Grieg's 100-year jubilee in UK, 55 min. (2007
- Urban X: Piece for drums, electronics and keyboards (30minutter) for The Norwegian Opera and ballet.
- Badnajazz, Vossajazz: Commission for kids. Piece for 25 drummers, saxophone, electronics, dance and video.
- Time is a blind guide: Commission for Conexions 2013, NRK/ BBC.
- Food/ Emulsion: Emulsion Sinfonietta, UK. Verk for Sinfonietta, 15min, 2014.
- Utsøgt Smerte/ Exquisite Pain: Sophie Calle. Theater i Copenhagen, Århus and Odense, DK. Full play.
- På drømt hav/ On Dreamt Ocean: Music/ installation with Knut Bry for Kjersti Alveberg, The Norwegian Opera and ballet.
- This is not a miracle: Composing full material for recording for ECM Records, 65min. Christian Fennesz/ Iain Ballamy.
- Civilization and its Discontents: Commission for Theatre by Mark Hewitt, Brighton, UK.
- Time is a blind guide/ Lucus: Composing full material for recording for ECM Records, Chamber ensemble.
- Sylvia: Commission for Theatre, Drama Teater, Tallinn, Estonia. Full piece.
- Lemur: Commission for Emulsion Sinfonietta, Cheltenham Music Festival. Durata 20 min.
- Extended blind Guide to India: Commission for Oslo World Festival, 2018. 75min for chamber-ensemble, drum- ensemble, vocal og steelguitar.
- Conversations with trees: Commission for Reading Fringe Festival (UK), 2019. Full concert for violin, accordion, voice, tap dance and drums.
- Bobo: Commission for Nordbotten Big band with Bobo Stenson (pn) as soloist, performed 10 times in 2019 to celebrate Stensons 75-years anniversary. Durata 25min.

== Discography ==
- Pohlitz (Rune Grammofon, 2006)
- Time is a Blind Guide (ECM, 2015)
- Lucus (ECM, 2018) with Time is a Blind Guide (Ayumi Tanaka, Hakon Aåse, Lucy Railton, Ole Morten Vågan)
- Bayou (ECM, 2021) with Ayumi Tanaka and Marthe Lea
- Relations (ECM, 2024)
- Off Stillness (ECM, 2025) with Time is a Blind Guide (Ayalon Tanaka, Håkon Aase, Leo Svensson Sander, Ole Morten Vågan)

With Yelena Eckemoff

- Nocturnal Animals (L & H Production, 2020)

With Parish

- Rica (Challenge, 2003)
- Parish (ECM, 2006)

With Food

- Food (Feral, 2000)
- Organic and GM Food (Feral, 2001)
- Veggie (Rune Grammofon, 2002)
- Last Supper (Rune Grammofon, 2004)
- Molecular Gastronomy (Rune Grammofon, 2007) with Iain Ballamy feat. Maria Kannegaard and Ashley Slater
- Quiet Inlet (ECM, 2010) feat. Christian Fennesz, Eivind Aarset, Prakash Sontakke, and Nils Petter Molvær
- Mercurial Balm (ECM, 2012), feat. Christian Fennesz, Eivind Aarset, Prakash Sontakke, Nils Petter Molvær
- This Is Not a Miracle (ECM, 2015) with Iain Ballamy, Christian Fennesz

With Humcrush

- Humcrush (Rune Grammofon, 2004) with Ståle Storløkken
- Hornswoggle (Rune Grammofon, 2006)
- Rest at World's End (Rune Grammofon, 2008)
- Ha! (Rune Grammofon, 2011) feat. Sidsel Endresen
- Enter Humcrush (Shhpuma, 2017)

With Maria Kannegaard Trio

- Breaking the Surface (ACT, 2000) with Maria Kannegaard, Mats Eilertsen
- Quiet Joy (Jazzland/Universal, 2005) with Maria Kannegaard, Ole Morten Vågan
- Camel Walk (Jazzland, 2008)

With Meadow

- Blissful Ignorance (Hecca/Musikkoperatørene, 2009) with John Taylor, Tore Brunborg

With Needlepoint

- The Woods Are Not What They Seem (BJK, 2010)
- Outside the Screen (BJK, 2012)

With others

- Atmosfear (Turnleft, 1997), with Bergmund Waal Skaslien
- Soundoff (Turnleft, 2000), with Bergmund Waal Skaslien
- Ståhls Blå (Dragon, 2001), with Ståhls blå
- Big Bambus (Bergland, 2001), with Big Bambus
- At First Light (Universal, 2001), with Silje Nergaard
- Love Seriously Damages Health (Bergland, (2001) with Siri Gjære
- Help is on Its Way (Ayler, 2003), with Bayashi
- African Flower (Haug, 2003), with Haug/Zanussi/Strønen
- Rica (Challenge, 2004), with Parish
- Absence in Mind (Jazzaway, 2004), with Anders Aarum Trio
- Skomsork (Park Grammofon, 2004), with Skomsork
- …………… (Caber, 2004), with Phil Bancroft Quartet
- Turanga (AIM, 2004), with Mats Eilertsen
- Schlachtplatte (Mooserobie, 2004), with Ståhls blå
- Sparkling (Jazzaway, 2004), with Trinity
- Rock! (Jazzaway, 2004), with Bayashi
- Time goes by (Universal, 2004), with Nora Brockstedt
- Soil (Ayler, 2004), with Fredrik Nordstrøm
- Flux (AIM, 2006), with Mats Eilertsen
- Monsters and Puppets (Gigafon, 2011) with Maria Kannegaard
- Voxpheria (Gigafon, 2012), with Tone Åse
