= The Low Frequency in Stereo =

Norwegian band

The Low Frequency in Stereo (Norwegian: den lave frekvensen i stereo)
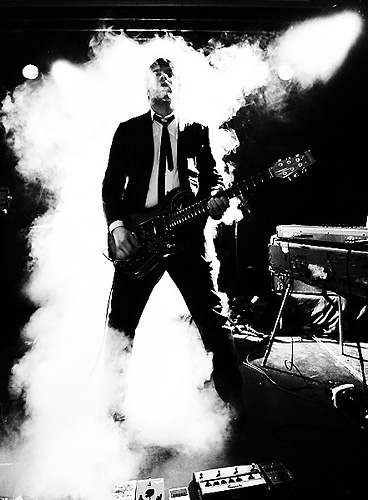
- The Low Frequency in Stereo in 2008

Background information
- Origin: Haugesund, Norway
- Genres: Lo-Fi Post-Rock
- Years active: 2000–present
- Labels: Rec 90, Rune Grammofon
- Members: Per Steinar Lie; Ørjan Haaland; Hanne Andersen; Njål Clemetsen

The Low Frequency in Stereo are a post-rock group that was founded in February 2000 in Haugesund, Norway.

The band is known both in Norway and internationally and have played renowned festivals like Quart, Dour and South By Southwest

Senior Editor of Rolling Stone David Fricke described their concert in Austin, Texas in 2005 as "a mixture of the long solo elements in The Doors set to the riptide of Joy Division's "Transmission" with the surf guitar twang of Dick Dale."

== Current line-up ==
- Per Steinar Lie - bass, vocals
- Ørjan Haaland - drums, vocals
- Hanne Andersen - guitar, organ, vocals
- Njål Clementsen - guitar, vocals
- Linn Frøkedal - guitar, organ, vocals

=== Former members ===
- Per Plambech Hansen - guitar (2000–2005)

== Discography ==
=== Albums ===
- The Low Frequency in Stereo (2002)
- Travelling Ants who Got Eaten by Moskus (2004)
- The Last Temptation Of...The Low Frequency in Stereo Vol. 1 (2006)
- Futuro (2009)
- Pop Obskura (2013)

=== Live ===
- Live at MoldeJazz feat. Kjetil Møster (LP, 2014)

=== EPs ===
- Die Electro Voice/Low Frequency 7" (2001)
- Moonlanding EP 10" (2001)
- Astro Kopp EP (2005)

=== Singles ===
- Monkey Surprise (2006)
