= Panzerpappa =

Norwegian progressive rock band

- Origin: Oslo, Norway
- Genres: Progressive rock, psychedelic rock
- Years active: 1998–present
- Label: Rune Grammofon
- Members: Steinar Børve; Trond Gjellum; Anders Krabberød; Jarle Storløkken
- Website: panzerpappa.com

Panzerpappa is a contemporary Norwegian progressive rock band based in Oslo.

== Biography ==
The band plays instrumental RIO or progressive rock with a humoristic twist ("Progressive Rock with a friendly face", in their own words), which is often reminiscent of inspirational precursors such as Samla Mammas Manna, King Crimson, Henry Cow, Univers Zero, Happy The Man and Frank Zappa.

Panzerpappa have released eight studio albums since their inception in 1998.

== Members ==
- Steinar Børve (saxophones, keyboards)
- Trond Gjellum (drums, percussion, samplers and several other instruments and sounds)
- Anders Krabberød (bass guitars, Chapman Stick, ekstra keyboards)
- Jarle Storløkken (guitars, keyboards, accordion)
- Torgeir Wergeland Sørbye (keyboards, trumpet)

== Discography ==
Albums

- 2000: Passer Gullfisk (Panzerpappa)
- 2002: Hulemysteriet (Panzerpappa)
- 2004: Farlig Vandring (Avant Audio Productions)
- 2006: Koralrevens Klagesang (Schmell Records)
- 2012: Astromalist (Rune Grammofon)
- 2016: Pestrottedans (AltrOck Records)
- 2019: Summarisk Suite (Apollon Records)
- 2025: Landsbysladder (Apollon Records)
