= Oddbjørn Blindheim =

Norwegian jazz pianist and dentist

- Born: Oddbjørn Sverre Blindheim; 24 February 1944 (age 82); Vigra, Sunnmøre, Norway
- Genres: Jazz
- Occupation: Musician
- Instrument: Piano

Oddbjørn Sverre Blindheim (born 24 February 1944 in Ålesund, Norway) is a jazz pianist from Vigra, the older brother of jazz bassist Svein Olav Blindheim, and a veteran on the Norwegian jazz scene.

== Biography ==
Blindheim started playing the piano as a teenager, when he rudely awakened to Bud Powell and Horace Silver. He finished dental studies in Oslo, and actively participated in the capital jazz scene during his studies. Over the years, he kept in touch with the jazz community and playing at times with touring musicians as well as with his own trio. As pianist, arranger and interpreter of beads from the jazz history, he is loud voice at the Norwegian jazz scene. With his trio he released the album Horace Hello (1999) is a tribute to Horace Silver with his brother Svein Olav on upright bass and drummer Håkon Mjåset Johansen. It received excellent reviews in the international press, presenting compositions of some key jazz pianists from 1950 to 1960. Blindheim is influenced by some of the key jazz pianists from 1950 to 1960 like Thelonious Monk, Bud Powell, Horace Silver, Bobby Timmons, Randy Weston, Ray Bryant, Vic Feldman, Sonny Clark and Jan Johansson. Blindheim's latest album Piano Pals (2014) with bassist Bjørn Alterhaug and drummer Eyvind Olsen Wahlen, where he finds inspiration in The Golden Age of Modern Jazz, the 1950s and the 1960s.

== Discography ==
- 1999: Horace Hello (Gemini Records)
- 2014: Piano Pals (Ponca Jazz Records)
