= Anna Sundström =

Swedish chemist (1785–1871)

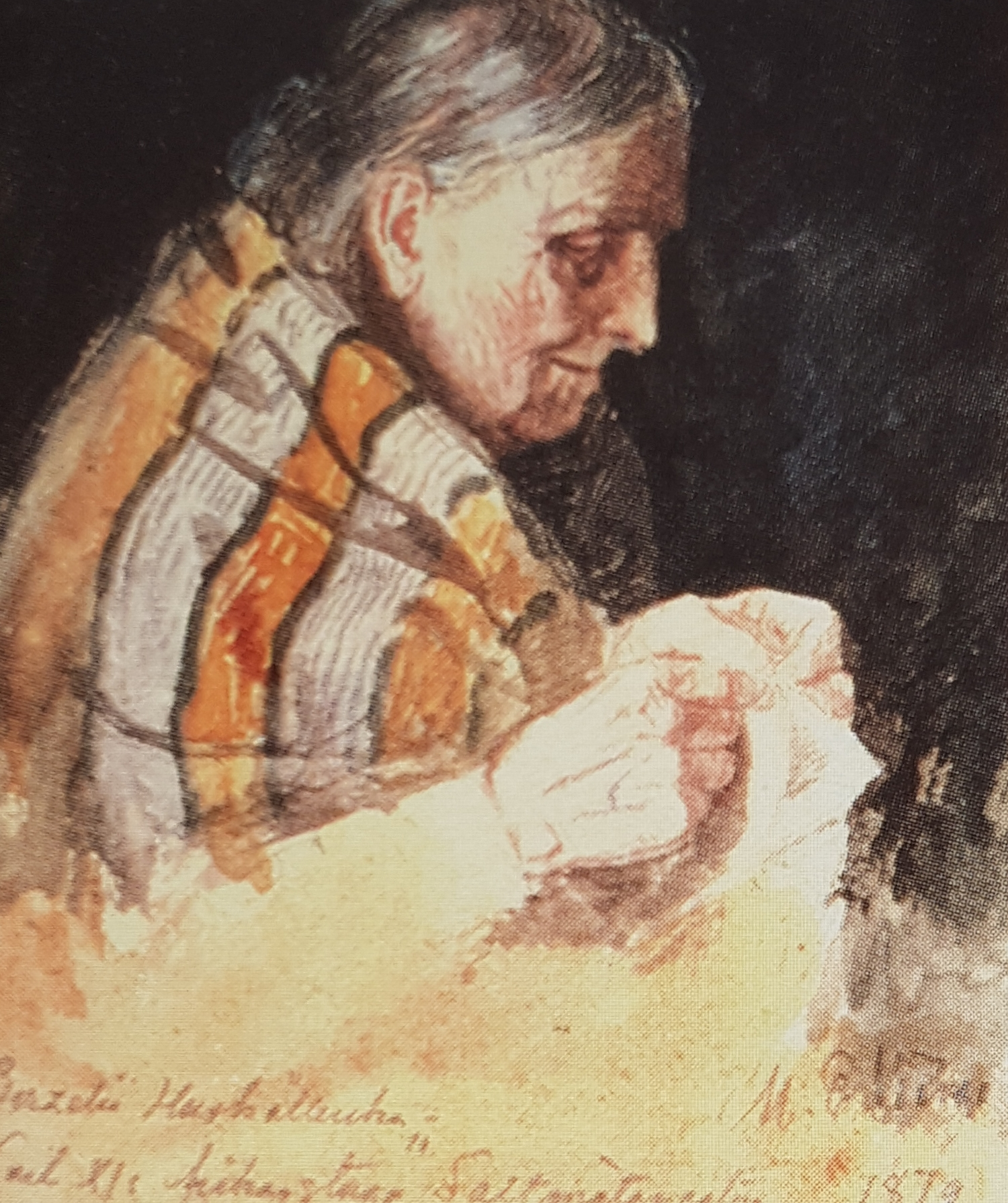
A portrait of Sundström by Mårten Eskil Winge

Anna Sundström, born as Anna Christina Persdotter (26 February 1785 in Kymlinge, Spånga – 1871), was a Swedish chemist. She was the assistant of the chemist Jöns Jacob Berzelius from 1808 to 1836. Anna Sundström has been referred to as the first female chemist in Sweden.

== Biography ==
Anna Persdotter was the daughter of the farmer Per Jansson, and later took the name Sundström. Early on, she moved to the capital to serve as a maid, and was in 1808 employed as the housekeeper of Jöns Jacob Berzelius, who was regarded as one of the fathers of modern chemistry. She acted effectively as his assistant and co worker during his research. During her work, she was educated in chemistry and acquired a vast knowledge within it. Berzelius stated : "She is used to all my equipment and their names to such a degree that I could without hesitation make her distill Hydrochloric acid." Sundström also administrated his laboratory as well as supervised his students, who affectionally called her "strict Anna".

She was forced to end her employment when Berzelius married Elisabeth Poppius in 1836. Here is some of the work that was done by Berzelius during the period in which Sundstrom was assisting him.

- The electrochemical reaction theory, which concludes that an electrical current can be sent between two substances to initiate a change of electrons.
- Electrochemical dualism, one of the better known works. It dealt with the voltaic pile, which was used in the first electrical battery invented by Humphry Davy in 1803, and its power to decomposes chemically in such a way that they were broken into tow oppositely charged components.
- Stoichiometry in inorganic chemistry, putting place the atomic weights of elements and the formulas for all inorganic compounds. This led later scientists coining it with the name stoichiometry
- The discovery of the elements vanadium, lanthanum, didymium, erbium, terbium, and selenium.

== Legacy ==
Every year, the Swedish Chemical Society's division of inorganic chemistry selects the best Swedish PhD-thesis in inorganic chemistry and presents the author with the Anna Sundström Award.

== See also ==
- Timeline of women in science
