= Supersilent =

Norwegian musical group

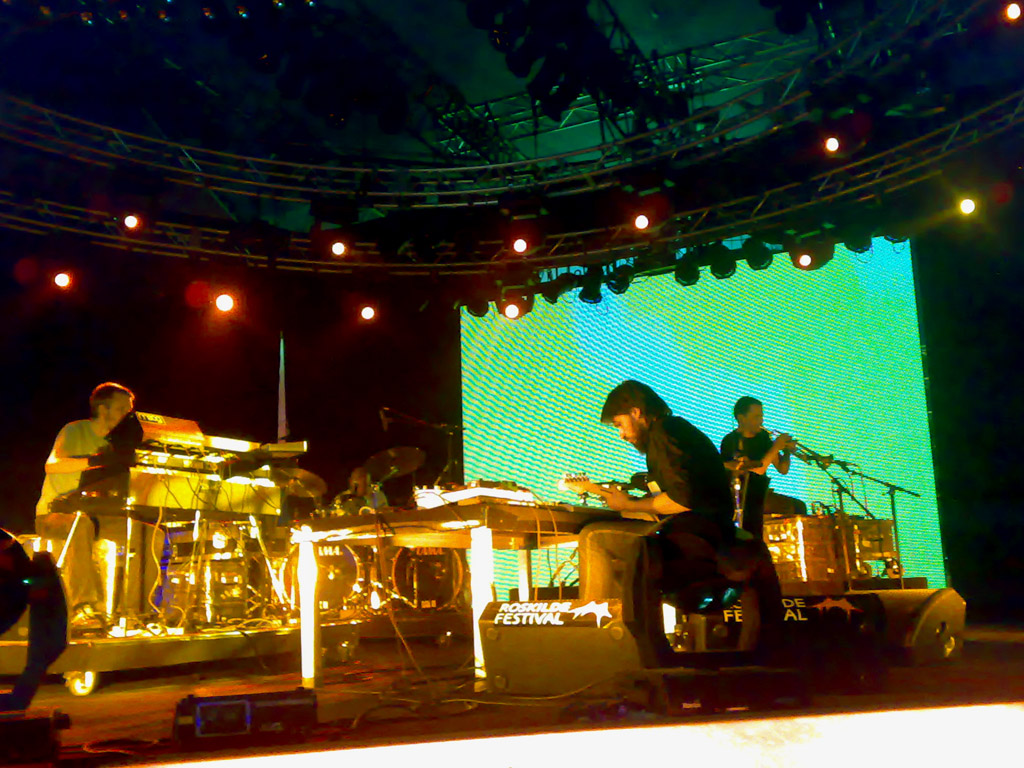
- Supersilent @ Roskilde Festival 2008

Background information
- Origin: Norway
- Genres: Avant-garde; Experimental music
- Label: Rune Grammofon
- Members: Arve Henriksen; Helge Sten (aka Deathprod); Ståle Storløkken
- Past members: Jarle Vespestad

Supersilent is a Norwegian avant-garde-improvisational music group formed at Nattjazz in Bergen in 1997. The trio Veslefrekk was asked to play with electronic musician Helge "Deathprod" Sten. The fusion of the experimental jazz group with Sten's rumbling drones and noise was so successful that they united as Supersilent.

That same year, their triple debut album 1-3 was released as the first release on the record label Rune Grammofon. The band attracted attention with their aggressive combination of improvised jazz, frirock and noise blowouts. They are known for making only improvised music and for the distinctive uniformity of their album covers.

== Status ==
Many details regarding the band suggests jazz as a classification: three of the four members of the band were formally educated as jazz musicians, the group regularly participate in jazz festivals, and their approach is to a certain extent informed by more amorphous, freer forms of jazz. However, their prominent use of electronic instrumentation such as synthesizers, theremin, loop pedals, and tape loops, as well as the rejection of traditional jazz structures, leads some to place the group's music outside their personal conception of the jazz genre.

== History ==
Supersilent was formed in 1997, when the free jazz trio Veslefrekk (Arve Henriksen on trumpet, keyboardist Ståle Storløkken, and Jarle Vespestad on drums) played a concert with producer and live electronics artist Helge Sten (also known as Deathprod). The concert encouraged them to record a three-disc, three-hour compilation of abrasive improvised material, simply titled 1-3, which was the label Rune Grammofon's first release in 1997. The name Supersilent derives from a logo on a truck seen in Oslo by the group around the time of these sessions.

They refined their sound slightly on the follow-up, 4, which was released a year after, and in 2001, they released 5, culled from live recordings between 1999 and 2000 that changed the focus to slowly shifting textures and an almost ambient pace.

Their 2003 release 6 is their most critically acclaimed album yet, with a focus on gentler and more melodic material. 7, released in 2005, is a DVD concert film showcasing a 2004 performance in its entirety, and is another of the group's most acclaimed works. Supersilent played at the Huddersfield Contemporary Music Festival 2005.

Storløkken is known from nearly a decade's cooperation with guitarist Terje Rypdal's group Skywards, and in 2007 Supersilent joined with Rypdal at Moldejazz for a concert.

8 was a studio album released in 2007 to mostly positive reviews. The material recorded in the 8 sessions was initially publicly announced for release as a double album entitled 8-9, but only a single album was released. Further material from these sessions was released in 2010 as the vinyl-only album 11.

Early in 2009, the group announced that their drummer Jarle Vespestad had departed to pursue other musical interests. The remaining three members continued recording material and appearing live. Their seventh release, 9, was released in late 2009, and is a documentation of a single concert the trio performed earlier that year, featuring non-standard instrumentation (three Hammond organs).

The group's next release has been revealed to be made up of "more acoustic" material, featuring the use of piano, recorded in the studio by the trio prior to the recording of 9. Entitled 10, this album was released on August 23, 2010.

Supersilent has over the last 14 years become one of the most acclaimed improvisational bands. John Paul Jones used the opportunity to join them at the Punkt festival 2010, in Kristiansand, Norway. The bassist and multi-instrumentalist Jones has a long and eventful career as a rock musician, best known from Led Zeppelin and Them Crooked Vultures. The spontaneous and improvised collaboration with Supersilent was interesting, and they met again for new performance at Moldejazz 2012.

== Approach to packaging and formatting ==
The packaging of the group's albums, designed by Kim Hiorthøy, is of a minimalist aesthetic: entirely white, with the exception of the cover and CD or LP label, which are printed a different colour on each release. Each label displays information about the tracks contained on the disc, and each cover displays the name and album number of the release, along with a barcode and recording and catalog details.

In keeping with the format of numbering each album, each track is numbered, reflecting the designation of the album it appears on and its position within the album. For example, the fourth track on the album 5 is entitled "5.4".

Tracks unreleased on any album but contributed to promotional compilations are prefixed with the letter C and are numbered after the compilation they appear on. For example, the track contributed to the third compilation the group were involved with was named "C - 3.1". Thus far, seven such tracks have been released between 1999 and 2010, each on a different compilation.

== Line-up ==
- Arve Henriksen - vocals, trumpet, percussion
- Helge Sten - live electronics, synthesizer, electric guitar
- Ståle Storløkken - synthesizer, piano
- Jarle Vespestad (1997–2009) – drums

== Honors ==
- "Alarmprisen" 2003 in the class Jazz, for the album 6

== Discography ==
All titles released by Rune Grammofon. Titles are live studio albums unless otherwise noted.

- 1–3 (1997) – triple live studio album
- 4 (1998)
- 5 (2001) – live album (tour)
- 6 (2003)
- 7 (2005) – concert film
- 8 (2007)
- 9 (2009) – live album (single concert)
- 10 (2010)
- 11 (2010)
- 100 (2010) – released only as part of Twenty Centuries Of Stony Sleep (box set)
- 12 (2014)
- 13 (2016)
- 14 (2018)
