= Jono El Grande =

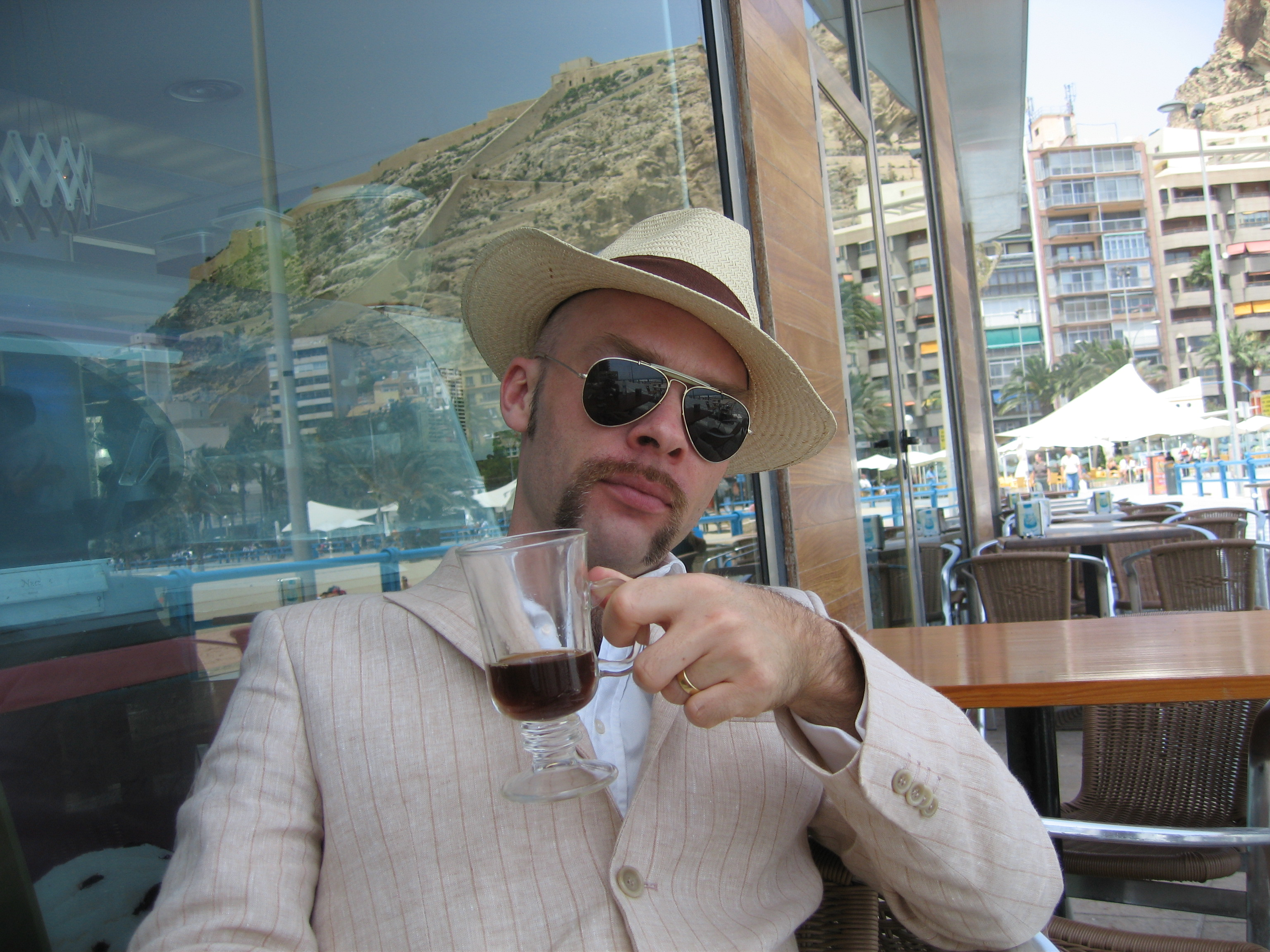

Background information
- Born: Jon Andreas Håtun; 29 July 1973 (age 52)
- Origin: Norway
- Genres: Progressive rock, Avant garde, Art rock
- Occupations: Musician, Composer, Copy writer
- Instruments: Vocals, Guitar, Keyboards, Kazoo
- Years active: 1994 -
- Label: Rune Grammofon
- Website: www.jonoelgrande.no

Jono El Grande (born 29 July 1973) is the stage name of Jon Andreas Håtun.

Jono El Grande is an autodidactic Norwegian composer, band leader, guitarist and conductor. He is the leader of the Norway Symphony Orchestra. Jono El Grande claims that his extreme mixture of genres and timbres is a result of his musical vision: moving away from the traditional concept of 'music as a result of social processes'.

Although Jono El Grande is enjoying growth on the European avant-garde scene, he is also known for his eccentric and amusing performance art/dada-inspired live shows. In 2000, he formed The Jono El Grande Orchestra, renamed Jono El Grande & The Luxury Band in 2005.

Jono El Grande has released eight albums, Utopian Dances (Krusedull Prod. - 1999), Fevergreens (Rune Grammofon - 2003), Neo Dada (Rune Grammofon - 2009), "Phantom Stimulance" (Rune Grammofon - 2010), The Choko King (Rune Arkiv - 2011) and "Melody of a Muddled Mason" (Rune Grammofon - 2015), in addition to contributing with compositions on other projects (both Rune Grammofons anniversary albums Money Will Ruin Everything 1 & 2" and on Wire Tapper #21", the avant-garde music magazine The Wire's 21st edition of their CD series). Jono El Grande served as festival composer for Happy Days 2007, presented by Ny Musikk, the Norwegian section of International Society for Contemporary Music (ISCM). He also became a member of the Norwegian Society Of Composers in the fall of 2010. He played at the Zappanale #22 (August 2011) and world premiered a new orchestral piece for the Bergen-located sinfonietta orchestra BIT20 Ensemble December 2011. In 2014, he wrote and released the classical piece "Til Anbjørg" (For Anbjorg) for his late wife. In November 2014, he world premiered a new piece for Trondheim Sinfonietta at Rockheim in Trondheim.

In 2017, he married designer and visual artist Ingunn Birkeland.

== Early life ==
Jon Andreas Håtun was born at Bærum Hospital, Norway. At the age of ten, far before he touched his first instrument, he began inventing various band concepts without the intent for performance. In 1988, he bought his first guitar, and in 1989 he formed his first actual band along with three school buddies - a teen-age punk rock combo called Mannes Fatales. They would perform stunt poetry in combination with pre-arranged electric noises. Jono El Grande served as the lead vocalist and lyricist. Mannes Fatales performed three concerts before disbanding in 1990. In the years 1990 - 1992, Jono El Grande assembled a series concept bands intended for one-night performances and recordings and/or rehearsings only: The Terror Duo, Black Satan, The Pez Dispensers, Acetaded Beat, As Drosera in addition to a handful of school bands formed to mark end-of-term celebrations and similar occasions.

From 1991 - 92, Jono El Grande worked as a radio host at the local station Radio Express. Two hours every Sunday for about a year, he played pure Frank Zappa- and art rock-related music. He also guest-hosted the progressive rock radio spot Uhørt in its very infancy. As of 2008, the show still airs on Norway's FM 99,3. After graduating from high school in 1992, Jono El Grande attended art school in Bergen. In 1994 - 95, Jono El Grande worked as assistant decorator at Norsk Film, building props for the movie Pakten (Waiting for Sunset) with Robert Mitchum. Eventually, in 1995, he quit his job to become a full-time composer.

== 1995 - 1999 ==
In 1995, Jono El Grande formed his first group, called Menü Bizarra, which performed only three concerts before it was disbanded later the same year. This band led to the performance art group Menü Tizz Aura, which performed dada shows in Oslo on both theatrical scenes as well as television shows. He then formed the group Grande Corpse, which never performed live. Grande Corpse played only at a few rehearsals in 1996, a project related to the never-performed opera A Gangrene Hangover. He also formed The Gringo Quartet, which held one show only at Volapük Cultural Forum in 1997. After this he formed Vidunderlige Vidda, also called Vidda, with one of the members from Menü Tizz Aura in 1997, Stein Stölen Bjerkaker. Vidda reached some local success in the following years. After disbanding Vidda late in 1998, Jono El Grande performed solo with electronic works. He then released music from the whole period 1995 - 1999 on his debut album Utopian Dances in December 1999.

== Discography ==
=== Albums ===
Title	Year	Label
Utopian Dances	1999	Krusedull Prod.
Fevergreens	2003	Rune Grammofon
Neo Dada	2009	Rune Grammofon
Phantom Stimulance	2010	Rune Grammofon
The Choko King	2011	Rune Grammofon/Rune Arkiv
Melody Of A Muddled Mason	2015	Rune Grammofon
Artificial Stupidity	2018	Cosmic Anthill
Live 2010	2022	Cosmic Anthill
All That Yoga And I Still Feel Like Shit	2024	Cosmic Anthill
Danceable Anxiety	2024	Cosmic Anthill
The Avant-gardist's Dilemma	2024	Cosmic Anthill
Everyone Is Kitschy	2024	Cosmic Anthill

==== Fevergreens ====
Fevergreens is an album by El Grande, released in 2003, with the following contents:

1. "Prologue"
2. "Awake, Wonderful and Lavish"
3. "I'm Not a Star I'm Just Lost in Space"
4. "Good Gracious"
5. "Cuban Serum"
6. "Rumba for a Slightly Excited Ape"
7. "Cha!"
8. "The Frenzied Butterflies"
9. "Centrifuge in d minor"
10. "Tango on the Crest of Reality"
11. "Ante's Inferno"
12. "Ariaph Orahri"
13. "Isle of View"
14. "Epilogue - Encore"

=== EPs ===
Title	Year	Label
Der Tod der Gegenwartsmusik (Music Cassette)	2016	Kassettkultur
Merciless Mediocrity	2023	Cosmic Anthill

=== Contributions ===
- Money Will Ruin Everything (Rune Grammofon - 2003) (Jono El Grande contributes with the composition "Tango On The Crest Of Reality".)
- Money Will Ruin Everything 2 (Rune Grammofon - 2008) (Jono El Grande contributes with the composition "Evas Horse Dance".)
- The Wire Tapper#21 (The Wire Magazine - 2009) (Jono El Grande contributes with the composition "Neo Dada".)
- Classic Rock Presents Prog CD - Dec 2011 (Jono El Grande contributes with the composition "Neo Dada".)

== Bands ==
- Menü Tizz Aura (1995–96)
- The Gringo Quartet (1996)
- Grande Corpse (1996–97)
- Vidunderlige Vidda (The Wonderful Mountain Plateau) (1996–98)
- The Jono El Grande Orchestra (2000–05)
- Jono El Grande & The Luxury Band (2005 - 2016)
- Norway Symphony Orchestra (2017 -)

== Musical highlights ==
- Oslo City Suite I-IV
- Tango on the Crest of Reality
- Centrifugue in D minor
- The Death of Contemporary Music
- Finnish Dance of Cysts
