= 6 (Supersilent album) =

Studio album by Supersilent
- Released: January 20, 2003
- Recorded: December 3–7, 2001; Halden, Norway
- Genres: Free improvisation, electronic
- Length: 57:48
- Labels: Rune Grammofon (RCD 2029)
- Producer: Deathprod

Supersilent chronology
5 (2001)	6 (2003)	8 (2007)

Professional ratings
Review scores
Source	Rating
AllMusic	4.5/5 stars
Pitchfork	9.1/10

6 is the fourth album by the Norwegian avant-garde free improvisation electronic group Supersilent. The album was recorded live in the studio over the course of five days and has no overdubs. 6 is among the most acclaimed and well-known Supersilent releases.

== Track listing ==
1. "6.1" – 11:06
2. "6.2" – 9:57
3. "6.3" – 13:32
4. "6.4" – 9:30
5. "6.5" – 5:03
6. "6.6" – 8:40

Vinyl track listing

Side one
No.	Title	Length
1.	"6.1"	11:06
2.	"6.2"	9:57

Side two
No.	Title	Length
1.	"6.3"	13:32

Side three
No.	Title	Length
1.	"6.4"	9:30

Side four
No.	Title	Length
1.	"6.5"	5:03
2.	"6.6"	8:40

== Personnel ==
- Arve Henriksen – vocals, trumpet, percussion
- Helge Sten – live electronics, synthesizer, electric guitar
- Ståle Storløkken – synthesizer
- Jarle Vespestad – drums

== Release history ==
Region	Date	Label	Format	Catalog
Norway	January 20, 2003	Rune Grammofon	CD	RCD 2029
Norway	August 20, 2003	Rune Grammofon	double LP	RLP 3029
Japan	August 28, 2005	Bomba Records	CD	BOM 24032
