= Svein Olav Blindheim =

Norwegian jazz musician, composer and writer

- Born: 25 July 1954 (age 71); Ålesund, Sunnmøre, Norway
- Genres: Jazz
- Occupation(s): Musician, composer, writer
- Instrument: Double bass
- Website: www.sveinolav.no

Svein Olav Blindheim (born 25 July 1954) is a Norwegian jazz double bassist, composer and writer, and the brother of jazz pianist Oddbjørn Blindheim.

== Biography ==
Blindheim was born in Ålesund, Norway and raised in Vigra, Sunnmøre, and has played in numerous orchestras and bands and released several recordings, including with Arild Nyquist and Lars Martin Myhre. He also plays in the band Gutta på skauen together with Per Vollestad and Fredrik Øie Jensen. Blindheim has resided in Hønefoss since 1983.

== Bibliography ==
- 2008: Tannregulering med Tørkesnor (in Norwegian)

== Discography ==
=== Solo albums ===
- 2008: Litt A' Kvart
- 2009: Junikveld

=== Collaborations ===
- 1985: Kalde Øl Og Heite Jenter (), with Trio Tre, including Arild Nyquist, Lars Martin Myhre
- 1987: 'Slemme Lars' Og Noen Andre (Tunsberg Grammofon), with Arild Nyquist
- 1993: Sol & Regn (SOL Records), with Arild Nyquist
- 1998: Odd Børretzens Mest Ålreite (Bare Bra Musikk), Compilation on "Vi Drømte Om Amerika"
- 1999: Horace Hello (Gemini Records), within Oddbjørn Blindheim Trio
