= Ultralyd =

Norwegian jazz/free rock band

- Origin: Stavanger, Norway
- Genres: Jazz, improvised rock
- Years active: 2004–present
- Labels: Rune Grammofon, Load
- Members: Kjetil Møster; Anders Hana; Kjetil D. Brandsdal; Morten J. Olsen
- Past members: Frode Gjerstad

Ultralyd (established 2004 in Stavanger, Norway) is a Norwegian jazz/free rock band initiated by the legendary saxophonist Frode Gjerstad in 2004. Gjerstad left the band after their second album ”Chromosome Gun” (2005) to be replaced by Kjetil Møster (known from The Core). During two extensive Europe tours and several studio sessions the direction of Ultralyd gradually changed from a rather chaotic free rock approach towards composition and more structured forms of improvisation, experimenting with different layers and altered roles of the instruments, integrating elements from contemporary and electronic music, funk and doom metal and ending up with an album that might be classified as something akin to the improvised chamber rock King Crimson were doing around 1973.

== Band members ==
- Kjetil Møster (saxophone)
- Anders Hana (guitar)
- Kjetil D. Brandsdal (bass)
- Morten J. Olsen (drums and vibraphone)

== Discography ==
Albums

- Ultralyd (FMR, 2004)
- Chromosome Gun (Load Records, 2005)
- Ultralyd/Noxagt split (Textile Records, 2006)
- Conditions For A Piece Of Music (Rune Grammofon, 2007)
- Renditions (The Last Record Company, 2009)
- Inertiadrome (Rune Grammofon, (2010)

Singles and EPs

- Average Human Being (Ultralyd, 2010)

Miscellaneous

- Throb and Provision (Utech Records, 2006)
