= Siril Malmedal Hauge =

Norwegian jazz singer and songwriter (born 1992)

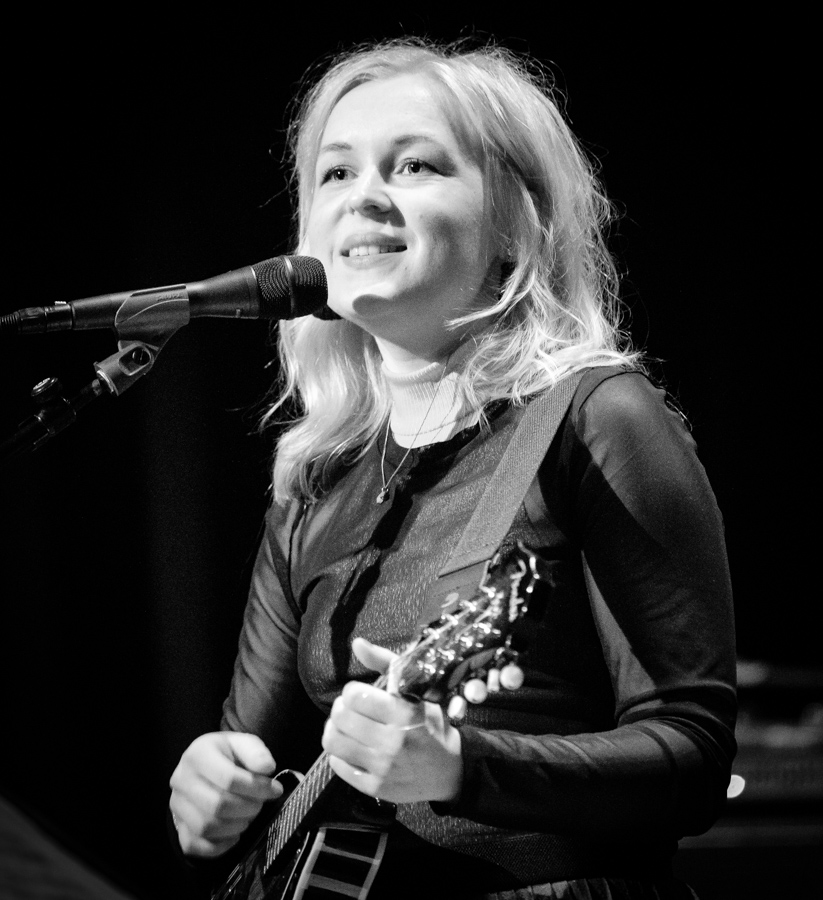
- Hauge performing in 2018

Background information
- Born: 28 November 1992 (age 33); Langevåg, Sula Municipality, Norway
- Origin: Norway
- Genres: Jazz
- Occupations: Musician, composer, band leader
- Instrument: Vocals

Siril Malmedal Hauge (born 28 November 1992 in Langevåg) is a Norwegian jazz singer and songwriter residing in Oslo, Norway.

== Biography ==
Hauge is a vocalist educated on the jazz program at Norwegian University of Science and Technology in Trondheim. In addition to heading projects like «Fieldfare» and «Wild Things Run Fast», she has collaborated with bands and musicians like Lars Jansson, Jesper Bodilsen, Anders Thorén, Jacob Young, Magnus Bakken, Henrik Lødøen, Alf Hulbækmo, Ytre Suløens Jazz Ensemble, MMO-ensemble, Martin Myhre Olsen the vocal ensemble Sonavi, and the Prøysen-project «Lillebror» (Little Brother) releasing their debut album on the Grappa label. In 2010 she received the Norwegian Cultural Education Council «Drømmestipendet (Dream scholarship)» and in 2011 Cultural grants from Sula Municipality. She has also played and toured in Norway, Sweden, Belgium, Germany, Estonia and Serbia.

In 2016 she released the album Jeg Går og Drømmer along with the pianist Alf Hulbækmo at Atlethic Sound Records. And releases the album Fieldfare in February 2017 on the label Øra Fonogram. She also contributes to the project Nordic Circles, releasing the album Under The Clouds (2017) on AMP music & records.

== Discography ==
=== Albums ===
- 2016: Siril & Alf - "Jeg Går og Drømmer" (Atlethic Sound Records)
- 2017: Lillebror - "Lillebror" (Grappa Musikk)
- 2018: Siril Malmedal Hauge/Jacob Young - "Last Things" (Oslo Session Recordings)
- 2019: "Uncharted Territory" (Jazzland Recordings)
- 2021: Siril Malmedal Hauge/Jacob Young - "Chasing Sunsets" (Oslo Session Recordings)
- 2021: "Slowly, slowly" (Jazzland Recordings)

=== Collaborations ===
2017: Nordic Cirkles II - "Under The Clouds" (AMP Musikk & Records)

2017: Fieldfare - "Fieldfare" (Øra Fonogram)

2016: Sugarfoot -"Different Stars" (Crispin Clover Records)

2013: LP "Wave" - Out Of His Hands, (Kakao Musikk)
