= Neo Dada (album) =

Studio album by Jono El Grande
- Released: March 16, 2009
- Genre: Experimental
- Length: 42 minutes
- Label: Rune Grammofon

Jono El Grande chronology
Fevergreens (2003)	Neo Dada (2009)	Phantom Stimulance (2010)

Neo Dada is a music album by the Norwegian composer and artist Jono El Grande, released by Rune Grammofon on 16 March 2009.

== Reception ==
Professional ratings
Review scores
Source	Rating
AllMusic	4.5/5 stars
The Guardian	3/5 stars
PopMatters	5/10
Tiny Mix Tapes	4/5 stars

Several reviews commented on the experimental nature of the album. Lukas Suveg, in a positive review for Tiny Mix Tapes, writes "Jono El Grande strikes a near-perfect balance between the traditional and the avant-garde, and his playful approach lends the album a great amount of accessibility without compromising his adventurous spirit." AllMusic's François Couture described Neo Dada as "late-era Zappa minus the scatological routines, plus an intentionally cheesy Latin element (think Señor Coconut)."

John L Walters, writing for The Guardian, considered the work an improvement over Jono El Grande's previous album Fevergreens, saying "Neo Dada sounds much more confident, exuberant, artful and bloody-minded." Dan Raper of PopMatters concludes "Cycling quickly through klezmer, jazz, and prog-rock, Jono El Grande presents an intriguing if a little ADD interpretation of experimental music."

== Track listing ==
All tracks are written by Jono El Grande

No.	Title	Length
1.	"Neo Dada"	4:19
2.	"Ballet Morbido in a Dozen Tiny Movements"	7:49
3.	"Oslo City Suite"	5:35
4.	"Your Mother Eats Like a Platypus"	5:18
5.	"Big Ben Dover"	3:54
6.	"Three Variations on a Mainstream Neurosis"	7:45
7.	"Choko King"	7:41
