= Food (band) =

Experimental jazz band

- Origin: Trondheim, Norway
- Genres: Jazz
- Years active: 1998–present
- Labels: ECM Records; Rune Grammofon
- Members: Iain Ballamy; Thomas Strønen
- Website: Food on Thomas Strønen's official website

Food (established 1998) is an experimental jazz band initiated by British woodwind multi-instrumentalist Iain Ballamy and Norwegian percussionist Thomas Strønen after a coincidental meeting first in Trondheim, Norway and later in Molde in 1997. They played two gigs at Moldejazz 1998, which were recorded live to two-track, and became their first album Food (2000).

Food highlights the delicate balance between Ballamy's melodic and lyrical playing and the electronic soundscapes and grooves from Strønen. They play as a duo, as well as with invited guests, such as on the second album, Organic and GM Food. Both of the two first albums were published on Ballamy's short-lived Feral Records, before the quartet moved to Rune Grammofon, where they released two more albums, Veggie (2002) and Last Supper (2004). These albums were with Henriksen and Eilertsen. Ballamy and Strønen played as a duo featuring Maria Kannegaard and Ashley Slater for the 5th album Molecular Gastronomy (2006). The next two releases incorporated Nils Petter Molvær, and others.

== Band members ==
Regular

- Iain Ballamy – saxophone
- Thomas Strønen – drums & electronics

Additional

- Arve Henriksen – trumpet, vocals & electronics
- Mats Eilertsen – double bass & electronics
- Nils-Olav Johansen – guitar, vocals & electronics
- Tom Arthurs – trumpet
- Maria Kannegaard – keyboards
- Ashley Slater – trombone
- Nils Petter Molvær – trumpet & electronics
- Christian Fennesz – guitar & electronics
- Eivind Aarset – guitar & electronics
- R.A Ramamani – vocals
- Joe Salyers – tambourine and triangle
- Ravi Chary – sitar
- Prakash Sontakke – slide guitar
- Morten Qvenild – keyboards

== Discography ==
- 1999: Food (Feral Records), Quartet: Iain Ballamy (saxophones), Arve Henriksen (trumpet, vocals, electronics), Mats Eilertsen (double-bass) & Thomas Strønen (drums, electronics)
- 2001: Organic and GM Food (Feral Records), Quartet
- 2002: Veggie (Rune Grammofon), Quartet
- 2004: Last supper (Rune Grammofon), Quartet
- 2007: Molecular Gastronomy (Rune Grammofon), Duo: Iain Ballamy & Thomas Strønen, feat. Maria Kannegaard & Ashley Slater
- 2010: Quiet Inlet (ECM), Duo feat. Christian Fennesz, Eivind Aarset, Prakash Sontakke & Nils Petter Molvær
- 2012: Mercurial Balm (ECM), Duo feat. Christian Fennesz, Eivind Aarset, Prakash Sontakke & Nils Petter Molvær
- 2015: This Is Not a Miracle (ECM), feat. Christian Fennesz
