= Megalodon Collective =

Jazz band

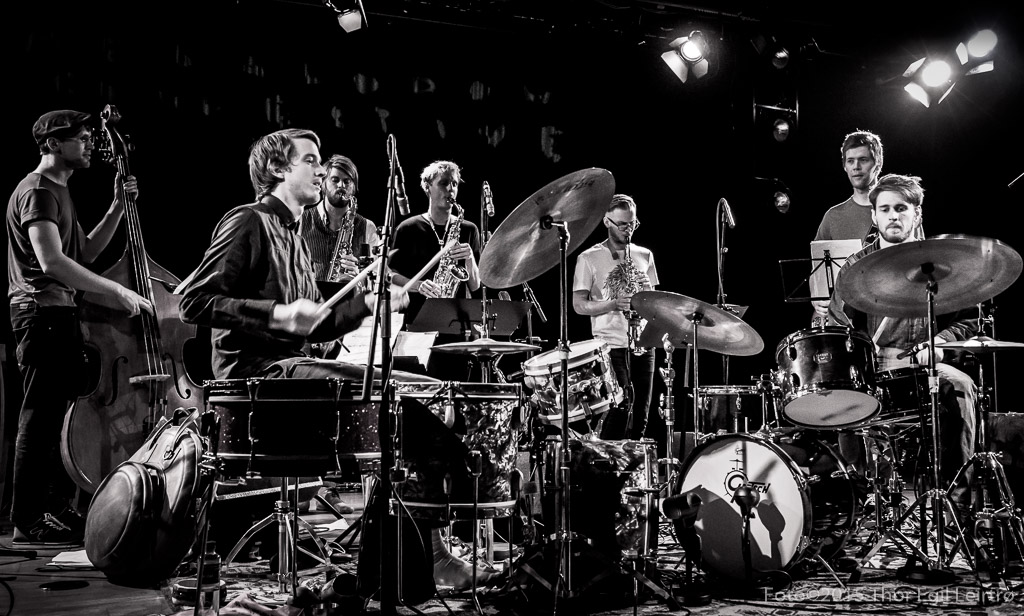
- Live at Dokkhuset, 2015 (Photo: Thor Egil Leirtrø)

Background information
- Origin: Trondheim, Norway
- Genres: Jazz
- Years active: 2014–present
- Labels: Gigafon, Jazzland
- Members: Karl Hjalmar Nyberg; Martin Myhre Olsen; Petter Kraft; Karl Bjorå; Aaron Mandelmann; Andreas Winther; Henrik Lødøen
- Website: megalodoncollective.com

Megalodon Collective (initiated 2014 in Trondheim, Norway) is a jazz septet based in Trondheim, with Norwegian and Swedish musicians.

== Biography ==
The band members all have a background from the jazz program at Norwegian University of Science and Technology, and are central in the Trondheim jazz scene. The debut album Megalodon (2015) was well received with a nomination for the Norwegian grammy, and followed by extensive touring.

== Band members ==
- Karl Hjalmar Nyberg - saxophone
- Martin Myhre Olsen - saxophone
- Petter Kraft - saxophone
- Karl Bjorå - guitar
- Aaron Mandelmann - upright bass
- Andreas Winther - drums
- Henrik Lødøen - drums

== Discography ==
- 2015: Megalodon (Gigafon)
- 2017: Animals (Jazzland)
- 2019: The Triumph (Jazzland)

== Honors ==
- 2016: Awarded the Jazzintro "This year's young jazz musicians" at Moldejazz
- 2016: Nominated to the Norwegian grammys for debut album
