= Espen Eriksen Trio =

Norwegian jazz piano trio

- Origin: Norway
- Genres: Jazz piano
- Years active: 2007–present
- Members: Espen Eriksen; Lars Tormod Jenset; Andreas Bye
- Website: www.espeneriksentrio.com

Espen Eriksen Trio is a Norwegian jazz piano trio formed in 2007, consisting of Espen Eriksen (piano), Lars Tormod Jenset (double bass) and Andreas Bye (drums). The group has released five albums on the Norwegian record-label Rune Grammofon.

== Performances ==
The trio has performed at the Molde Int. Jazz Festival, the Oslo Jazz Festival, the Maijazz and Vossajazz in Norway, the Jazz Province Festival in Russia and the Penang Jazz Festival in Malaysia, in addition to several club performances in Germany, Switzerland, Great Britain and Malaysia.

== Discography ==
=== Studio albums ===
- 2010: You Had Me At Goodbye (Rune Grammofon)
- 2012: What Took You So Long (Rune Grammofon)
- 2015: Never Ending January (Rune Grammofon)
- 2018: Perfectly Unhappy (Rune Grammofon), with Andy Sheppard
- 2020: End of Summer (Rune Grammofon)
- 2023: As Good As It Gets (Rune Grammofon), with Andy Sheppard

=== Live albums ===
- 2022: In The Mountains (Rune Grammofon), with Andy Sheppard

=== Compilations ===
- 2011 JazzCD.no #5
- 2010: Twenty Centuries Of Stony Sleep (Rune Grammofon)
- 2009: Runeology 4 (Rune Grammofon)
