= Ståle Storløkken =

Norwegian jazz musician and composer (born 1969)

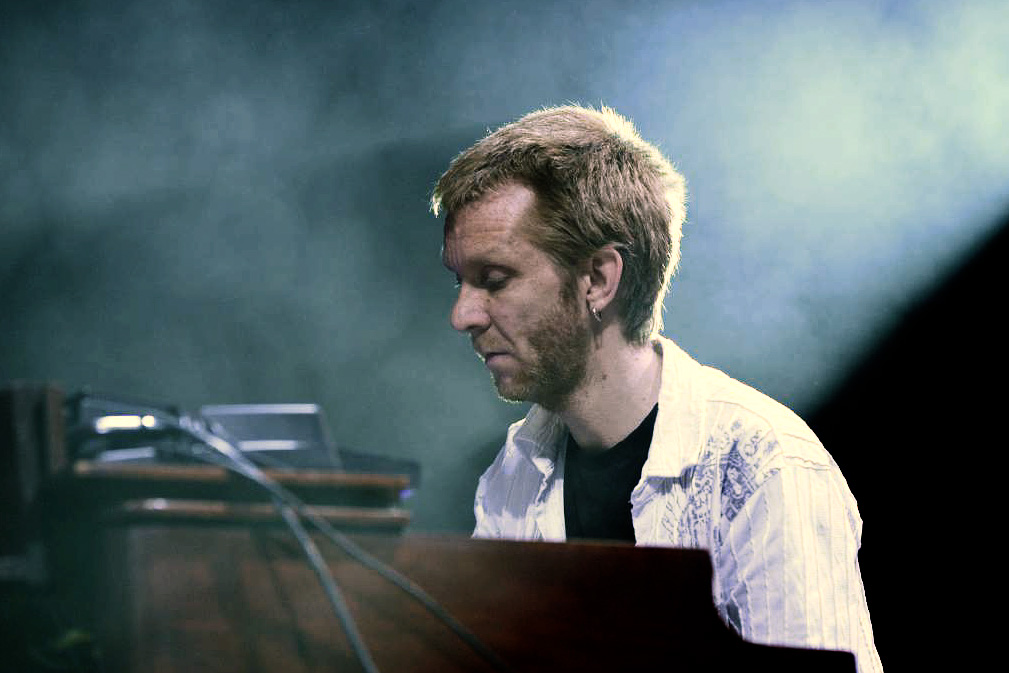
- Storløkken, Moers festival 2009

Background information
- Born: 22 February 1969 (age 57); Dombås, Dovre, Norway
- Genres: Jazz, rock
- Occupations: Musician, composer
- Instrument: Keyboards
- Label: Rune Grammofon
- Website: www.sjobygda.no/project/stale-storlokken

Ståle Storløkken (born 22 February 1969 in Dombås, Norway) is a Norwegian jazz musician (keyboards, organ and piano) and composer, known for collaborations with artists like Terje Rypdal, BigBang, Supersilent and Motorpsycho. He is married to the Norwegian singer Tone Åse.

== Career ==
Storløkken was educated on the Jazz program at Trondheim Musikkonservatorium (1988–90), and subsequently did his postgraduate there too. During the studies he started the band Veslefrekk together with fellow students Arve Henriksen and Jarle Vespestad (Helge Sten joined the band at a later stage). In 1997 the name of the band changed to Supersilent. They have released six critically acclaimed albums on the label Rune Grammofon. From 1995 he played in the trio BOL along with his wife Tone Åse and Tor Haugerud.

Storløkken has been active in many contexts, both as a band leader and member, for example The Stoken Experience, and Terje Rypdal's Skywards. Along with Christian Wallumrød, and he composed the commissioned work Eight Thirty to Kongsberg Jazz Festival 1994. He has collaborated on a number of albums with the named bands, and otherwise at such musicians as Gunnar Andreas Berg, Eldbjørg Raknes, Audun Kleive and Thomas Strønen.

Storløkken together with Thomas Strønen has the Humcrush duo, which has released three albums. He also plays in the trio Elephant9, along with Torstein Lofthus and Nikolai Eilertsen. He co-composed Berit Opheim's commissioned work An angel with for Vossajazz 2007, and in 2010 composed and performed his one commissioned work for Moldejazz with the band Motorpsycho, Trondheim Jazz Orchestra and Trondheim Soloists.

== Discography ==
- 1991: Block Songs (Pop Eye), with Epinastic Movements
- 1993: En flik av ... (Bodega), with Bodega Band
- 1994: Veslefrekk (NorCD), with Veslefrekk
- 1996: Frode (Necessary Prod.), with Frode Alnæs
- 1996: The Music Machine (Curling Legs), with Gunnar Andreas Berg
- 1996: Letters (Turn Left), with Håvard Lund
- 1997: By-Music (Da-Da), with Didrik Ingvaldsen
- 1998: Read My Lips (EMI), with Ole Edvard Antonsen
- 1998: Point (Dragon), with Anders Kjellberg
- 1998: The Norske Jazzscene - turnéer vinter/vår 1998 (Den Norske Jazzscene), with various artists
- 1999: Cosmic Ballet (Bergland Productions), with Pocket Corner
- 1999: Det bor en gammel baker... (Via Music), with Eldbjørg Raknes
- 2000: History and Movement (Via Music), with Didrik Ingvaldsen
- 2000: Floating Rhythms (Via Music), with Terje Isungset
- 2000: Generator X (Jazzland), with Audun Kleive Generator X
- 2000/2001: Cure (Music Network, with Cadillac
- 2001: European Improvised Music (Nor CD/Sofa), with various artists
- 2001: BOL (Via Music), with BOL
- 2001: New Cumber (Bergland Productions), with Cucumber Slumber
- 2002: Denne lille pytten er et hav (Curling Legs), with Sverre Gjørvad
- 2002: Blokk 80 (2002), with S. Møller Storband
- 2003: Money Will Ruin Everything (Rune Grammofon), with various artists
- 2004: Ohmagoddabl (Jazzland), with Audun Kleive Generator X
- 2004: No Slumber (Bergland Productions), with Cucumber
- 2004: Runeology2 (Rune grammofon), with various artists
- 2004: Valse Mysterioso (NorCD), with Veslefrekk
- 2004: Humcrush (Rune Grammofon), with Humcrush
- 2005: Runeology (Bomba records), with various artists
- 2005: Silver Sun (Curling Legs), with BOL
- 2005: Chime (Spicytuna), with Lisbeth Diers
- 2006: Until human voices wake us and we drown (Rune Grammofon), with various artists
- 2006: Vossabrygg (ECM), with Terje Rypdal
- 2006: Hornswoggle (Rune Grammofon), with Humcrush
- 2006: Poetic Terrorism (Grandsport), with BigBang
- 2007: Strjon (Rune Grammofon), with Arve Henriksen
- 2008: Skylab (NorCD), with BOL
- 2008: St Fin Barre's (Leo Records), with Mark O'Leary & Stein Inge Brækhus
- 2010: Very Much Alive (Jazzland (6xCD, Album)), with Paolo Vinaccia featuring Terje Rypdal, Ståle Storløkken & Palle Mikkelborg
- 2012: The Death Defying Unicorn (Stickman Records (Germany)), with Motorpsycho
- 2012: Numb, Number (Gigafon Records), with BOL
- 2015: En Konsert For Folk Flest (Rune Grammofon), with Motorpsycho
- 2019: The Haze Of Sleeplessness (Hubro)
- 2020: Conspiracy (ECM), with Terje Rypdal
- 2021: "Ghost Caravan" (Hubro)
