= Sangam (Trygve Seim album) =

Studio album by Trygve Seim
- Released: 11 October 2004
- Recorded: October 2002 and March 2004
- Studio: Rainbow Studio, Oslo
- Genre: Jazz, free jazz, chamber jazz
- Length: 1:09:28
- Label: ECM Records; ECM 1797
- Producer: Manfred Eicher

Sangam is a 2004 studio album by Norwegian jazz saxophonist Trygve Seim. The album was Seim's second solo release on the ECM Records label and developed musical themes introduced on his solo debut, Different Rivers, and from his free jazz collaborations with The Source.

The album title is derived from the Sanskrit word sangam, which can mean 'the meeting point of three rivers'. This has been interpreted by critics as reflecting the album's music, which is a meeting point between jazz, contemporary composition, and Norgwegian folk.

Sangam includes Seim's composition, 'Himmelrand I Tidevand', commissioned by Redningsselskapet, the Norwegian Society for Sea Rescue, for their 110th jubilee in 2001.

== Reception ==
Professional ratings
Review scores
Source	Rating
AllAboutJazz	4.5/5 stars
The Guardian	4/5 stars

Sangam was warmly received by many jazz critics upon release, with many unified in their agreement of the album's positive qualities. In a review by John Fordham for The Guardian, Sangam was described as the epitome of the ECM jazz aesthetic and, while containing many slow compositions, Seim's "subtle and sumptuous overlaying of textures" was felt to create excitement and a "sense of evolution". The role of 'texture' was similarly highlighted in a review by Martin Longley for BBC Music, who wrote that Seim's music was concerned with the "gradual shift of texture", using composition to create colour, a quality also echoed by John Kelman in All About Jazz. As with the critical appraisal of its predecessor, this textural approach was perceived negatively by some, with Blair Sanderson of AllMusic describing Sangam as often "incredibly ponderous and heavy-going" owing to "the extremely slow tempi".

Beyond the textural approach of Sangam, critics appreciated the individual performances, particularly by Seim himself, as well as by Arve Henriksen and Frode Haltli. Seim's saxophone performances were noted for their "ethereal yet grounded" quality, a sentiment echoed by Christopher Porter in JazzTimes, who observed the musical symbiosis between Seim and Henriksen: "Seim's airy, Jan Garbarek-influenced playing [is supported by the group], while the remarkable trumpeter Arve Henriksen plays the mirrorlike brass counterpart to the leader's reeds." The inclusion of virtuoso accordionist Frode Haltli was highlighted as bringing a refreshing sonic texture to Sangam, while also providing opportunities to better incorporate Seim's interest in Norwegian folk music. Seim would go on to collaborate with Haltli in a number of sessions after Sangam, including the albums Yeraz and Rumi Songs, also released on ECM Records.

== Track listing ==
All tracks composed Trygve Seim.

1. 'Sangam' - 6:27
2. 'Dansante' - 11:58
3. 'Beginning An Ending' - 9:31 (Drum programming - Arve Furset & Trygve Seim)
4. 'Himmelrand I Tidevand'
  1. Part I - 8:17
  2. Part II - 6:23
  3. Part III - 9:01
  4. Part IV - 5:12
5. 'Trio' - 7:03
6. 'Prayer' - 5:31

== Personnel ==
- Trygve Seim - Tenor and soprano saxophones
- Håvard Lund - Clarinet, bass clarinet
- Nils Jansen - Bass saxophone, contrabass clarinet
- Arve Henriksen - Trumpet
- Tone Reichelt - French horn
- Lars Andreas Haug - Tuba
- Frode Haltli - Accordion
- Morten Hannisdal - Cello
- Per Oddvar Johansen - Drums
- Øyvind Brække - Trombone
- Helge Sunde - Trombone
- Christian Eggen - Conductor (string section)
- Jan Erik Kongshaug - Engineer
- Manfred Eicher - Producer
