= Finn Guttormsen =

- Born: 16 July 1968 (age 57); Mosjøen, Nordland
- Origin: Norway
- Genres: Jazz
- Occupations: Musician, composer
- Instruments: Bass guitar, Dobro, Double bass
- Years active: 1990 -
- Labels: Kirkelig Kulturverksted; Ipecac Recordings & Turn Left

Finn Guttormsen (born 16 July 1968 in Mosjøen, Norway) is a Norwegian Jazz musician (upright bass), known for his dedicated contributions to the Farmers Market and recently to the Silje Nergaard Band, and musicians like Trygve Seim, Øyvind Brække, Per Oddvar Johansen, Håkon Storm-Mathisen, Jarle Vespestad, Hans Mathisen, Arve Henriksen.

== Career ==
Guttormsen is a graduate of the jazz program at Trondheim Musikkonservatorium (1990). He was first recognized as bassist in the Farmers Market, where he has contributed since the start in 1991. He has also been a member of bands like The Source (1995–2005) and Quaternion, and has played within Hemisfair. In recent years he has also contributed within Håkon Storm-Mathisen Quartet and Silje Nergaard Band.

== Honors ==
- Spellemannprisen 2008, in the Open class, within Farmers Market
- Spellemannprisen 2012, in the Open class, within Farmers Market

== Discography ==
=== Within The Farmers Market ===
- 1995: Speed / Balkan / Boogie
- 1997: Musikk fra Hybridene (Music from the Hybrids) (Kirkelig Kulturverksted)
- 2000: Farmers Market (Winter & Winter)
- 2008: Surfin' USSR (Ipecac Recordings)
- 2012: Slav to the Rhythm (Division Records)

=== With Elias Akselsen ===
- 2003: Her kommer dine arme små (Via Music), with Stian Carstensen and Dag Wolf
- 2005: O, Jesus, du som fyller alt og alle (Via Music). Songs by Aage Samuelsen, with Stian Carstensen and Knut Hem

=== With Silje Nergaard ===
- 2007: Darkness Out of Blue (Universal), Within The Silje Nergaard Band
- 2009: A Thousand True Stories (Universal), Within The Silje Nergaard Band
- 2010: If I Could Wrap Up A Kiss (Sony Music), Within The Silje Nergaard Band

=== With other projects ===
- 1991: Block Songs (Pop Eye), With Epinastic Movements
- 1993: Rapid (Pop Eye), With Epinastic Movements
- 1996: Letters (Turn Left), with Håvard Lund
- 1997: Timbuktu (Turn Left), within Quaternion (including Jarle Vespestad, Hans Mathisen & Arve Henriksen
- 2002: The Source And Different Cikadas (ECM Records), with Trygve Seim, Øyvind Brække & Per Oddvar Johansen
- 2002: Jul På Månetoppen (RCA), Music from the TV-series Jul På Månetoppen
- 2007: 12 Fluid Ounces (City Connections), With Oslo Fluid as Dr. Rutger
- 2006: Paint Christmas White (Big Box Records), with Christian Ingebrigtsen
- 2007: Blue Blue Grass Of Home (Wilma Records), With Hemisfair
- 2007: The Source:Of Christmas - Live (Grappa), With The Source
- 2009: Two Rivers One Road (Fairplay Entertainment/Playground, 2009) With Jørn Hoel and Steinar Albrigtsen

=== Compilation albums ===
- 1994: The Sweet Sunny North (Koch International), With Farmers Market
- 1996: The Sweet Sunny North, Vol 2 (Koch International), With Farmers Market
- 1999: Balkans Without Borders (Omnium Records), With Farmers Market
- 2007: Vandringsmannens Beste (Via Music), With Elias Akselsen
