= Nils Jansen =

Norwegian jazz musician (born 1959)

- Born: 30 March 1959 (age 67); Haugesund, Rogaland
- Origin: Norway
- Genres: Jazz
- Occupations: Musician, composer, arranger and music teacher
- Instruments: Tenor, soprano, bass saxophone, bass clarinet

Nils Jansen (born 30 March 1959 in Haugesund, Norway) is a Norwegian jazz musician (saxophone and clarinet), known from several recordings and jazz orchestras.

== Career ==
Jansen attended the Jazz program at Trondheim Musikkonservatorium (1995–98), and joined band like Ellipse, Per Husby Quintet, "Trondheim Big Band" and Søyr. After moving to Oslo, he has played within orchestras like "Radiostorbandet", med Espen Rud Sextet, Trygve Seim Ensemble, Magni Wentzel Sextet, "Sharp 9", and musicians like Christina Bjordal, Staffan William-Olsson and Håkon Storm.

Jansen and Espen Rud has had a number of performances with the show Jazzmask for Rikskonsertene.

== Discography ==
Within Søyr

- 1988: Vectors (Hot Club)

With Karsten Brustad

- 1991: Intarsia (Origo Sound)

With Trygve Seim

- 2000: Different Rivers (ECM)
- 2005: Sangam (ECM)

Within Østenfor Sol

- 2001: Troillspel (MajorStudio)

Within the Magni Wentzel Sextet

- 2001: Gershwin: Porgy & Bess (Norway Music)

With Helge Sunde & Norske Store Orkester

- 2006: Denada (ACT), feat. Olga Konkova & Marilyn Mazur

Within Trondheim Jazz Orchestra

- 2009: What If? A Counterfactual Fairytale (MNJ), feat. Erlend Skomsvoll
- 2011: Migrations (MNJ), feat. Øyvind Brække
- 2011: Kinetic Music (MNJ), feat. Magic Pocket
