= The Source (band) =

Norwegian jazz band

- Origin: Norway
- Genres: Jazz, jazz fusion
- Years active: 1993-present
- Labels: Curling Legs; ECM Records; Grappa Music
- Members: Trygve Seim (1993-present, saxophone); Øyvind Brække (1993-present, trombone); Mats Eilertsen (2005-present, bass); Per Oddvar Johansen (1993-present, drums).
- Past members: Ingebrigt Håker Flaten (1993-1995, bass); Finn Guttormsen (1995-2005, bass)

The Source established in 1993 in Trondheim, Norway, is a Norwegian jazz band known for its many recordings and collaborations in musical fusion concepts. Their Christmas concerts are considered a tradition in Norway.

The band, a quartet was made up of Trygve Seim (saxophone), Øyvind Brække (trombone), Ingebrigt Håker Flaten (bass) and Per Oddvar Johansen (drums). In 1995, Finn Guttormsen replaced Flaten on bass. He was replaced by Mats Eilertsen in 2005. The band was nominated to Spellemannprisen in 2007 for its album The Source of Christmas Live.

== Recordings ==
Year	Album title	Record label	Charts NORWAY	Notes
1994	Olemanns kornett	Curling Legs	–	Music influenced by Ornette Coleman, Thelonious Monk and Charles Mingus
2002	The Source and Different Cikadas	ECM Records	–	With Cikada Ensemble and Arve Henriksen
2006	The Source	ECM Records	–	Music of Brekke and Edward Vesala
2007	The Source: of Christmas, Live	Grappa Music	–	With Tora Augestad, Marvin Charles, Lars Klevstrand, Jarle Bernhoft, Anne-Lise Berntsen, Finn Guttormsen, Ahmad El Ghazar, Alfred Gamil, Ayman Sedki, Fathy Salama, Mamdouh Serour, Cheb Hocine Derras, Ramadan Mohamed and Saleh el Artist, plus Kongelige Norske Marines Musikkorps (Norwegian Navy Band) conducted by Christian Eggen
2013	The Source: of Summer	Grappa Music	26	
