= Øyvind Brække =

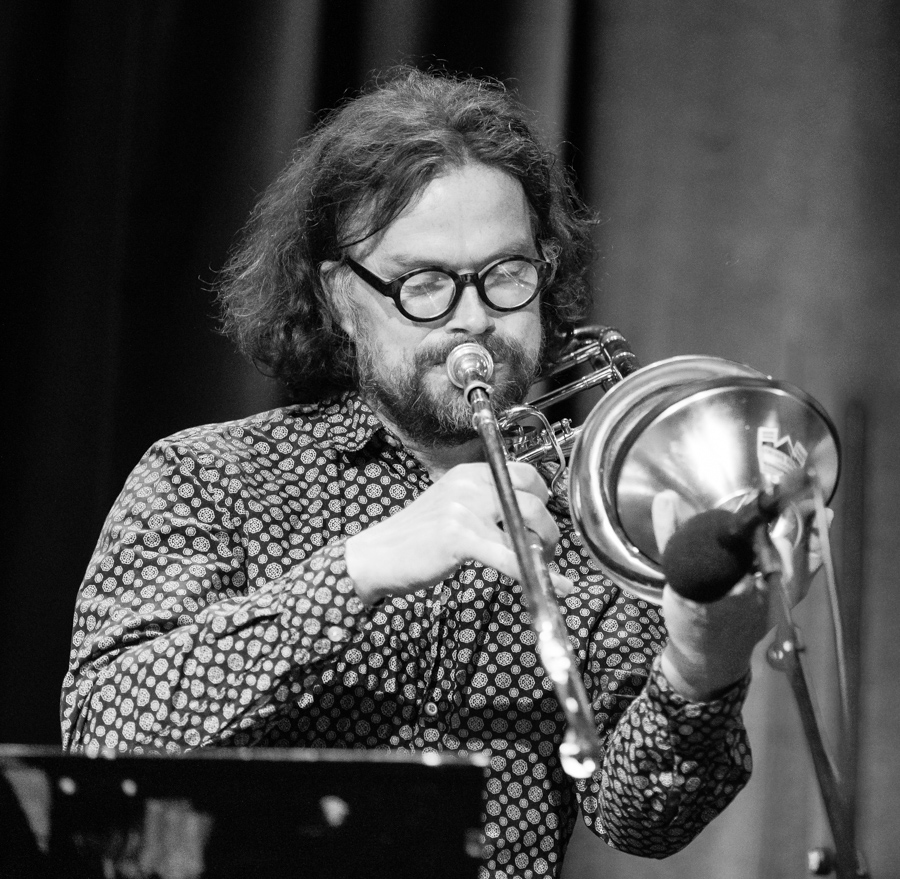
- Øyvind Brække performing in 2020

Background information
- Born: 25 August 1969 (age 56); Bærum, Akershus
- Origin: Norway
- Genres: Jazz
- Occupations: Music arranger & musician
- Instrument: Trombone

Øyvind Brække (born 25 August 1969) is a Norwegian jazz musician (trombone), composer, music arranger and band leader, best known for Bodega Band and S. Møller Storband. He was the initiator of the popular and still active band The Source, who released several albums, and made contributions to dozens of recordings with musicians like Chick Corea, Eirik Hegdal, Per Zanussi, Erlend Skomsvoll, Trondheim Jazz Orchestra, Knut Kristiansen, Jacob Young, Trygve Seim, Per Oddvar Johansen, Mathilde Grooss Viddal, Dingobats, Sverre Gjørvad, Motorpsycho, FriEnsemblet and Come Shine.

== Career ==
Brække was born in Bærum, where his jazz career started in Sandvika Storband. He played on the SS recordings Come Rain or Come Shine (1989) and Contemporary Music For Big Band (1991) with them, and joined the band "Why Not" in 1990. He studied on the Jazz program at Trondheim Musikkonsevatorium (1991–93), and was a member of several bands on the Trondheim jazz scene, including Bodega Band from 1992 (recording. 1992) and S. Møller big band, which he led. Great luck did student band "The Source" which he co-founded in 1992. The quartet has so far made seven CDs, "Olemann cornet" 1994, "Of Christmas" 1995, "The MotorSourceMassacre" 2000, "The Source and different cikada" 2002, "Of Christmas Live at Blue", 2002, "The Source" 2005 and "The Source of Christmas Live" (released 2007). It has completed a number of tours and festival gigs, including along with the rock band Motorpsycho and string quartet Cicada.

In 1998 Brække moved permanently back to Oslo where he established himself in various bands. Beside The Source, he has had a long engagements with Trondheim Jazz Orchestra, evidenced by the albums Live in Molde (2000), We are? (2004), What if? (2009), Morning songs (TJO & Per Zanussi, 2009) and not least his own significant project with ), Migrations TJO & Øyvind Brække, performed in trondheim 2009 and released on album in 2011.

== Discography ==
Within "Sandvika Storband»

- 1989: Come Rain or Come Shine (SS Records)
- 1991: Contemporary Music For Big Band (SS Records)
- 2011: A Novel Approach (SS Records), as guest soloist

Within The Source (Trygve Seim & Per Oddvar Johansen)

- 1994: Olemanns Kornett (Curling Legs)
- 2000: Roadwork Vol. 2: The MotorSourceMassacre (Stickman Records, Germany), with Motorpsycho & Deathprod
- 2002: The Source And Different Cikadas (ECM Records), with
- 2005: The Source: Of Christmas (Curling Legs)
- 2006: The Source (ECM Records)
- 2007: Live (Grappa Music)

Within Trondheim Jazz Orchestra

- 2000: Live in Molde (MNJ Records), TJO & Chick Corea
- 2004: We are? (Jazzaway Records), TJO & Eirik Hegdal
- 2009: What if? A Counterfactual Fairytale (MNJ Records), TJO & Erlend Skomsvoll
- 2009: Morning songs (MNJ Records), TJO & Per Zanussi
- 2011: Migrations (MNJ Records), TJO & Brække

Within Trygve Seim

- 2000: Different Rivers (ECM Records)
- 2004: Sangam (ECM Records)

Within Crimetime Orchestra

- 2005: Life Is A Beautiful Monster (Jazzaway Records), feat. Bjørnar Andresen
- 2009: Atomic Symphony (Jazzaway Records), feat. Sonny Simmons & KORK

Within Mathilde Grooss Viddal, FriEnsemblet

- 2005: Holding Balance (Giraffa Records)
- 2009: Come Closer (Giraffa Records)
- 2012: Undergroove (Giraffa Records), with Mathilde Grooss Viddal & Friensemblet
- 2015: El Aaiun - across the Border (Giraffa Records), feat Safaa al Saadi
- 2017: Out of Silence (Giraffa Records), feat Naïssam Jalal and Mathilde Grooss Viddal

With other projects

- 1995: Monk Moods (Odin Records), with Knut Kristiansen
- 1995: Letters (Turn Left Prod.), with Håvard Lund
- 1999: History And Movement (Via Music), with Didrik Ingvaldsen & Pocket Corner
- 1999: Utopian Dances (Krusedull Prod.), with Jono el Grande
- 1999: Glow (Curling Legs), with Jacob Young
- 2001: Pöck (), within Dingobats
- 2001: Denne Lille Pytten Er Et Hav (), within Sverre Gjørvad
- 2002: Variasjoner (Vossajazz Records), with Erlend Skomsvoll live at Vossajazz 2002
- 2003: Heaven (ACT), with Christof Lauer & Norwegian Brass with Sondre Bratland, Rebekka Bakken & Geir Lysne
- 2003: In Concert (Curling Legs), within Come Shine, with The Norwegian Radio Orchestra
- 2005: Krissvit (Moserobie Records), with Torbjörn Zetterberg
- 2006: Denada (ACT), within Helge Sunde's Norske Store Orkester feat. Olga Konkova & Marilyn Mazur
- 2006: Holdin Balance (Giraffa), with Mathilde Grooss Viddal & Friensemblet
- 2007: Sudoku (Real Records), within Sharp Nine
- 2008: Fabatune (Curling Legs), with Lars Andreas Haug
- 2009: Come Closer (Giraffa), with Mathilde Grooss Viddal & Friensemblet
- 2009: Cycle of silence (ACT), with Frøy Aagre
