= Trude Eick =

Norwegian musician and composer

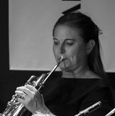

Background information
- Born: 23 April 1969 (age 57); Drammen, Buskerud
- Origin: Norway
- Genres: Jazz, classical music
- Occupation: Musician
- Instruments: French horn, electronics
- Website: Trude Eick on Myspace

Trude Eick (born 23 April 1969) is a Norwegian musician (French horn and electronics) and composer, known from different forms of music, in which she plays regular repertoire as well as free improvisation. She is the sister of musicians Mathias Eick and Johannes Eick.

== Career ==
Eick was born in Drammen and raised in Hof, Vestfold. She is a graduate of the Norwegian Academy of Music and has worked in Forsvarets Musikkorps, Trøndelag for a period. Eick is best known for improvising in Eick/Viddal Duo with bass clarinetist and saxophonist Mathilde Grooss Viddal, which was central to the series "Kvinnelige improviserende instrumentalister". The duo toured with the show Konkylia van Tare og Tusen Tang (2005). As trio they include Hedvig Mollestad Thomassen (guitar), and as quartet with Øyvind Brække (trombone) and Børge Are Halvorsen (saxophone).

She has appeared on releases by Bugge Wesseltoft New conceptions of jazz (1996) and Torbjørn Sunde Octet (2001). She has toured with Ole Bolås and Sigrun Eng (cello), among others, and has at times conducted Chateau Neuf Storband. She played with Frøy Aagre's Offbeat at Dølajazz (2007).

Eick is associated with Toneheim Folk High School and the Music program at 'Rud videregående skole'.

== Discography ==
Within Ym-Stammen

- 1994: (Vi Blir) Fisk (Grappa Music)

With Bugge Wesseltoft

- 1996: New Conception of Jazz (Jazzland Recordings)
- 2008: New Conceptions of Jazz Box (Jazzland Recordings)

With Finn Coren

- 1999: Lovecloud (Bard Records)

With Torbjørn Sunde Octet

- 2001: Where Is The Chet (K&K Verlagsanstalt)

With Anja Garbarek

- 2005: Briefly Shaking (EMI Music Norway)

With Anders Rogg & Audun Myskja

- 2005: Videre: Toner Til Refleksjon Og Avspenning (Kirkelig Kulturverksted)

With Marit Larsen

- 2006: Under the Surface (Virgin Records)
- 2008: The Chase (Virgin Records)

With Mathilde Grooss Viddal

- 2006: Holding Balance (Giraffa Records), within Chateau Neuf Fri Ensemble
- 2008: November Log (Giraffa Records), within Viddal/Eick Duo

With Maria Mena

- 2008: Cause And Effect (Columbia Records)

With Friensamblet

- 2009: Come Closer (Giraffa Records)

With Frøy Aagre

- 2010: Cycle of Silence (ACT Company)

With Dimmu Borgir

- 2010: Abrahadabra (Nuclear Blast)

With Martin Hagfors

- 2010: I Like You (Strømland Records)
