= Eldbjørg Raknes =

Norwegian jazz vocalist (born 1970)

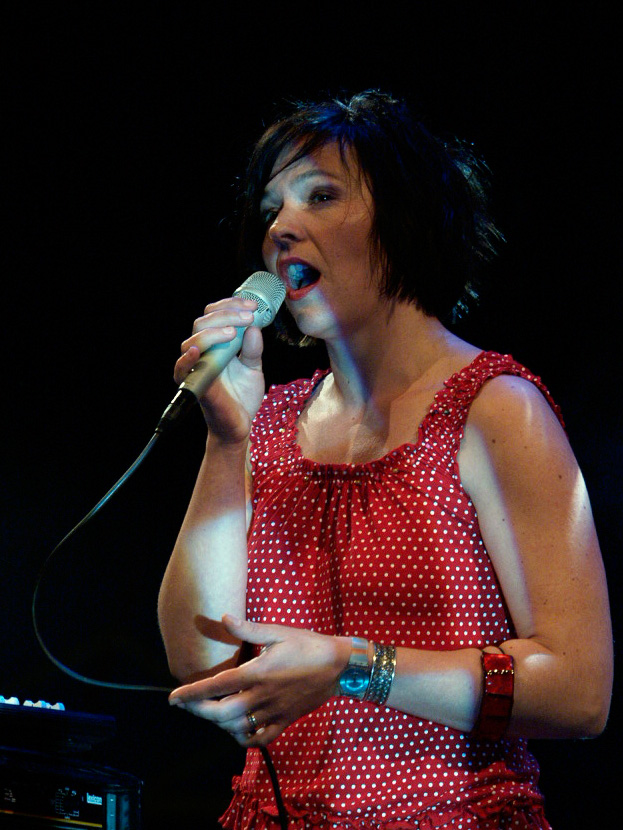
- Eldbjørg Raknes at the Moers Festival 2007

Background information
- Born: 9 February 1970 (age 56); Midsund Municipality, Møre og Romsdal, Norway
- Genres: Jazz
- Occupations: Musician, composer
- Instruments: Vocals, piano
- Label: My Recordings
- Website: eldbjorgraknes.com

Eldbjørg Raknes (born 9 February 1970 in Midsund Municipality, Norway) is a Norwegian jazz vocalist known for her a cappella vocal performances, innovative improvised vocals and electronic effects. She has collaborated with musicians such as Jon Balke, Anders Jormin, Bendik Hofseth, Christian Wallumrød, Arve Henriksen, Ketil Bjørnstad, and Ståle Storløkken. She is the sister of the bassist Steinar Raknes.

== Career ==
Raknes was educated in the music program of Atlanten videregående skole (secondary school) in Kristiansund (1986–89), in drama at Romerike Folkehøgskole (Folk high school - 1990), and in the Jazz program at Trondheim Conservatory of Music (1991–94), with specializations in voice pedagogy, arrangement, and composition. As a student she sang with Bodega Band and collaborated with the keyboardist Christian Wallumrød among others. She has also worked with the vocal quartet Kvitretten, with three album releases. She currently works as an instructor in the jazz program at Trondheim Conservatory of Music.

She has toured with Concerts Norway and played at several international jazz festivals in a duo with Anders Jormin as well as a member of groups including Bodega Band, TINGeLING, Søyr, Kvitretten, and Trondheim Voices.

Raknes has her own recording company, "My Recordings" (2006).

== Honors ==
- 2000: Kardemommestipendiet
- 2011: Radka Toneff Memorial Award
- 2011: Buddyprisen
- 2012: Gammleng-prisen inn the class Jazz

== Discography ==
Solo projects

- 1996: Voices (Curling Legs)
- 1999: Det bor en Gammel Baker... (Via Music), original compositions to lyrics by Inger Hagerup
- 2002: So Much Depends on a Red Wheel Barrow, (Platearbeiderne), commissioned work for Vossajazz
- 2004: Många Röster Talar (Bergland Prod.), with Maria Kannegaard (piano), Mats Eilertsen (bass), and Per Oddvar Johansen (trommer), original compositions to lyrics by Karin Boye
- 2005: Små sanger mest i det blå (Bergland Prod.), original compositions to lyrics by Torgeir Rebolledo Pedersen and others
- 2006: Solo (My Recordings), solo improvisations on lyrics by Olav H. Hauge, Lewis Allen, Federico García Lorca, and Doris Q
- 2009: From frozen feet heat came (My Recordings), with Eirik Hegdal (saxophone) and Stian Westerhus (guitar)
- 2013: Open (My Recordings), with Audun Kleive
- 2014: You Make Me Feel (My Recordings), with Oscar Grönberg

With others

- 1992: En flik av ((Studentersamfundet i Trondhjem, Plateselskapet)), with Bodega Band
- 1996: Sjå alltid etter ein utveg, with ESE (Elin Rosseland & Sidsel Endresen)
- 1996: Letters (Turn Left Prod.), with Håvard Lund
- 1997: Reisetid (Grappa Music), with Ketil Bjørnstad
- 1997: Vinterreise (Tylden)
- 1997: Med kjøtt og kjærlighet (Curling Legs), with Søyr
- 1997: TINGeLING (NorCD), with Nils-Olav Johansen (guitar), Per Oddvar Johansen (drums) & Maria Kannegaard (keyboard)

Awards
Preceded by Karl Seglem	Recipient of the Buddyprisen; 2011	Succeeded by Tore Brunborg
Preceded by Elin Rosseland	Recipient of the Radka Toneff Memorial Award; 2011	Succeeded by Hanne Hukkelberg
Preceded by Solveig Slettahjell	Recipient of the Jazz Gammleng-prisen; 2012	Succeeded by Olga Konkova
