= Different Rivers =

Studio album by Trygve Seim
- Released: 9 October 2000
- Recorded: 1998–1999
- Studios: Rainbow Studio, Oslo
- Genres: Jazz, free jazz, chamber jazz
- Length: 55:21
- Labels: ECM Records; ECM 1744
- Producers: Trygve Seim, Christian Wallumrød, Øyvind Brække; Manfred Eicher

Different Rivers is an album by Norwegian jazz saxophonist Trygve Seim, released on ECM Records. Released in 2000, Different Rivers was Seim's solo debut for ECM Records and began his long association with the label, as both a leader and sideman.

The album was recorded and produced throughout 1998 and 1999 and, unusually, without the direct production assistance of ECM founder, Manfred Eicher. Instead the album was recorded at one of Eicher's favoured Oslo studios using long-serving ECM audio engineer Jan Erik Kongshaug. Eicher is credited as 'executive producer'.

Different Rivers is noted for establishing Seim's jazz aesthetic, entailing unusual arrangements and instrumentation, as well as infusing classical and Eastern influences.

== Reception ==
Professional ratings
Review scores
Source	Rating
Jazz Journal	4.5/5 stars
The Guardian	5/5 stars

Warmly received by many jazz critics upon release, Different Rivers won the German Record Critics Prize, "Jahrespreis – Preis der Deutschen Schallplattenkritik" in 2001 and is frequently considered a landmark album in ECM's recording catalogue.

In a 5-star review for The Guardian, John Fordham wrote that Different Rivers was "destined to become one of ECM's classics", describing the album as falling into the free jazz idiom while revealing Seim to be an "up-tempo Wayne Shorter playing Ben Webster". Jazz musician and author, Mike Zwerin, was similarly enthused by the album. Writing in The New York Times he declared Different Rivers to be both melancholic and hypnotizing, describing the listening experience as "like a fireplace in an ice palace, you get hooked on it; it's almost physical".

Seim's impressionistic jazz aesthetic was not universally appreciated, with Jazz Times describing Different Rivers more negatively, as "new-age jazz, mostly composed, with ultraslow tempos and almost immobile lines". Different Rivers nevertheless continues to attract positive jazz criticism. In revisiting the album's ECM Touchstone Series re-release, the Jazz Journal described Different Rivers as "...a masterclass in precision and control ... a most remarkable achievement".

The landmark album status of Different Rivers was celebrated in 2010 when Seim's composition, 'Ulrikas Dans', was selected for inclusion on Arild Andersen's Celebration album, alongside those of seminal ECM artists, including Keith Jarrett, Jan Garbarek, Dave Holland, and Chick Corea. Recorded with Tommy Smith and the Scottish National Jazz Orchestra, Celebrations was devised as a contribution to ECM's 40th anniversary celebrations. Different Rivers was later one of 50 ECM albums selected for re-release under the 'Touchstone Series', to celebrate the label's 50th anniversary.

== Track listing ==
All tracks composed Trygve Seim.

1. "Sorrows" - 6:27
2. "Ulrikas Dans" - 7:49
3. "Intangible Waltz" - 5:47
4. "Different Rivers" - 5:51
5. "Bhavana" - 4:23
6. "The Aftermath/African Sunrise" - 6:16
7. "Search Silence" - 0:50
8. "For Edward" - 5:33
9. "Breathe" - 9:19
10. "Between" - 2:18

== Personnel ==
- Trygve Seim - Tenor and soprano saxophones
- Arve Henriksen - Trumpet, trumpophone, vocals
- Håvard Lund - Clarinet, bass clarinet
- Nils Jansen - Bass and sopranino saxophones, contrabass clarinet
- Hild Sofie Tafjord - French horn
- David Gald - Tuba
- Stian Carstensen - Accordion
- Bernt Simen Lund - Cello
- Morten Hannisdal - Cello
- Per Oddvar Johansen - Drums
- Paal Nilssen-Love - Drums
- Øyvind Brække - Trombone
- Sidsel Endresen - Recitation
- Jan Erik Kongshaug - Engineer
- Trygve Seim, Christian Wallumrød, and Øyvind Brække - Producer
- Manfred Eicher - Executive producer
