= Jacob Young (musician) =

Norwegian jazz musician (born 1970)

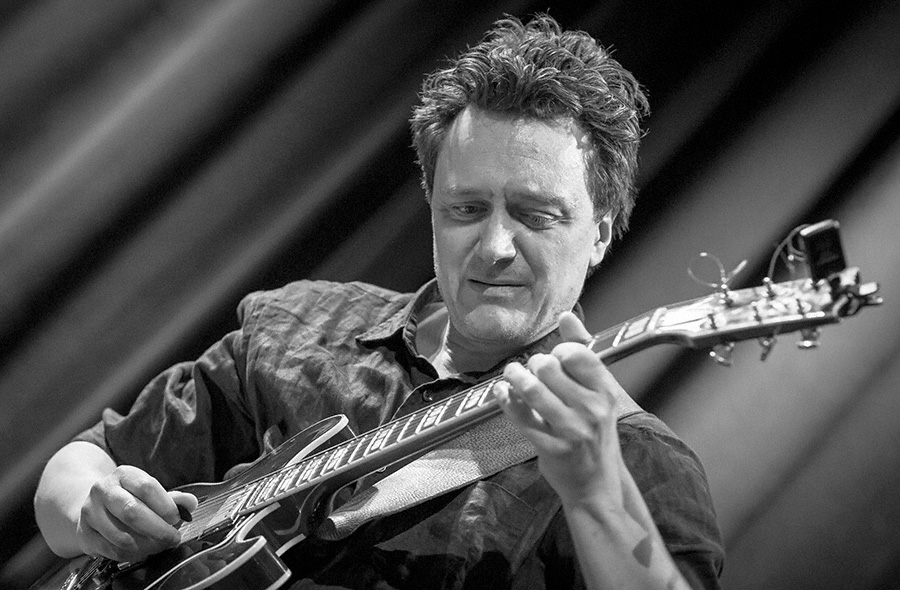
- Young at Cosmopolite in Oslo, 2016

Background information
- Born: Jacob Albert Young; 14 July 1970 (age 56); Lillehammer, Norway
- Genres: Jazz
- Occupations: Musician, composer
- Instrument: Guitar
- Years active: 1995–present
- Website: www.jacobyoung.no

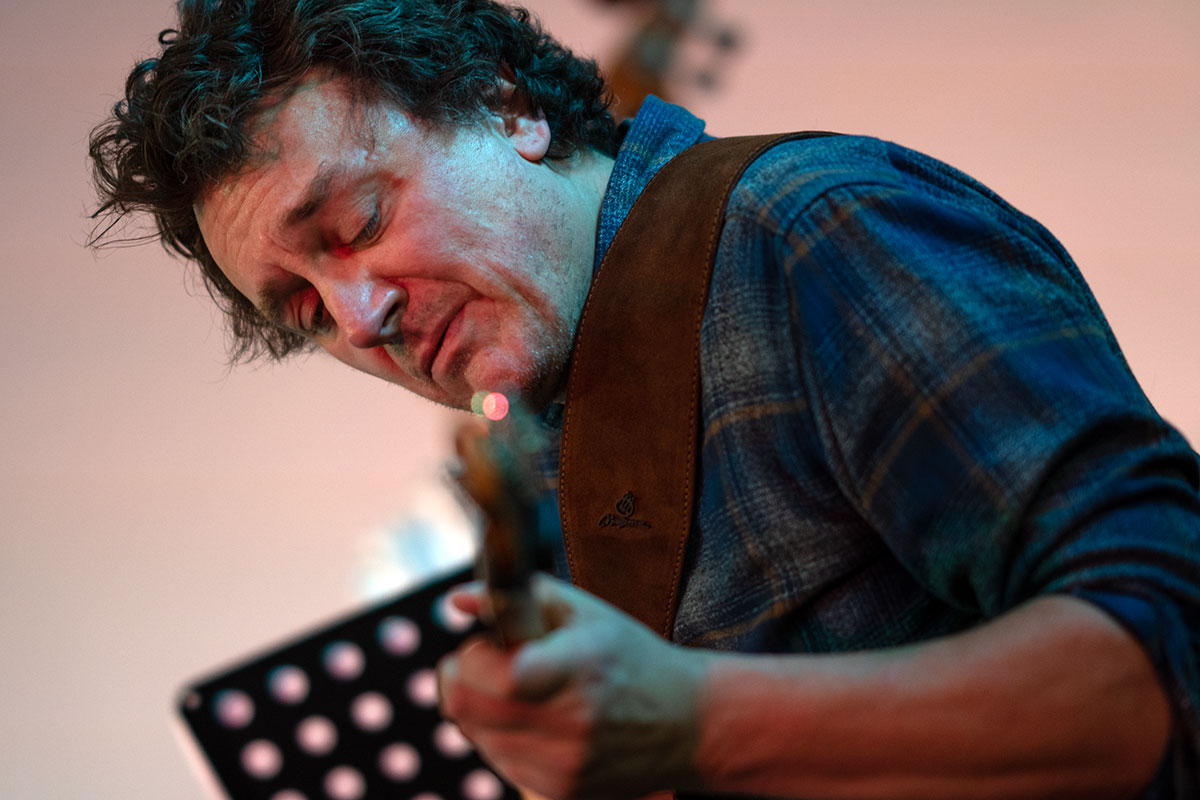
Aarhus 2023 Photo Hreinn Gudlaugsson

Jacob Albert Young (born 14 July 1970) is a Norwegian jazz guitarist, arranger, composer, and band leader. He has recorded with Karin Krog, Arild Andersen, Larry Goldings, Nils Petter Molvær, Bendik Hofseth, Terje Gewelt, Per Oddvar Johansen, Arve Henriksen, Jarle Vespestad, Trygve Seim, Mats Eilertsen, Vigleik Storaas, Christian Wallumrød, Bendik Hofseth, Håkon Kornstad, Knut Reiersrud, and Audun Erlien.

== Career ==
Young was educated at the University of Oslo and in New York. After graduation, he returned to Oslo in 1995, and released the album This is you (1995), with the musicians Larry Goldings, Nils Petter Molvær, Bendik Hofseth, Terje Gewelt and Per Oddvar Johansen. The debut record was followed up by the album Pieces of time (1997), with the same lineup.

On the third solo album, Glow (2001), Arve Henriksen, Jarle Vespestad, Trygve Seim, Mats Eilertsen, Vigleik Storaas, Christian Wallumrød, Bendik Hofseth, Håkon Kornstad, Øyvind Brække, Knut Reiersrud, Audun Erlien and Reidar Skår contributed. The duo with Karin Krog resulted in the album Where flamingos fly (2002), assisted by bassist Arild Andersen.

His own band, Jacob Young Group, consisting of Mathias Eick (trumpet), Vidar Johansen (clarinet and saxophone), Mats Eilertsen (bass), and Jon Christensen (drums). They released the album, Evening falls (2004), and toured Europe. A derivation of J.Y. Group, the Jacob Young Trio with Eilertsen and Christensen, have toured Macedonia.

In 2003, he was awarded Gammleng-prisen.

== Honors ==
- Gammleng-prisen 2003 in the category Jazz

== Discography ==
=== Solo albums ===
- 1995: This Is You (NorCD)
- 1997: Pieces of Time (Curling Legs)
- 2001: Glow (Curling Legs)
- 2002: Evening Falls (ECM, 2002)
- 2007: Sideways (ECM)
- 2014: Forever Young (ECM)
- 2023: Eventually (ECM)

With Siril Malmedal Hauge

- 2017: Last Things (Oslo Session)

With Bendik Hofseth and Paolo Vinaccia

- 2017: Rathkes Gate 12:21:58 (Oslo Session)

With InterStatic (Young/Powell/Vespestad)

- 2011: Anthem (PVY)
- 2012: InterStatic (RareNoise)
- 2014: Arise (RareNoise)

With Karin Krog

- 2002: Where Flamingos Fly (Grappa)

With David Rothenberg and Sidiki Camara

- 2020: They Say Humans Exist (Oslo Session)

=== Collaborations ===
With Ivan Mazuze

- 2015: Ubuntu (Losen)

With Nordic Circles

- 2017: Under the Clouds (AMP)

With Sidiki Camara Group (André Viervoll, Audun Erlien, Bendik Hofseth)

- 2015: Nakan (Wingman)

Awards
Preceded by Vigleik Storaas	Recipient of the Jazz Gammleng-prisen; 2003	Succeeded by Live Maria Roggen
