= Freddy Wike =

Norwegian Jazz musician (born 1976)

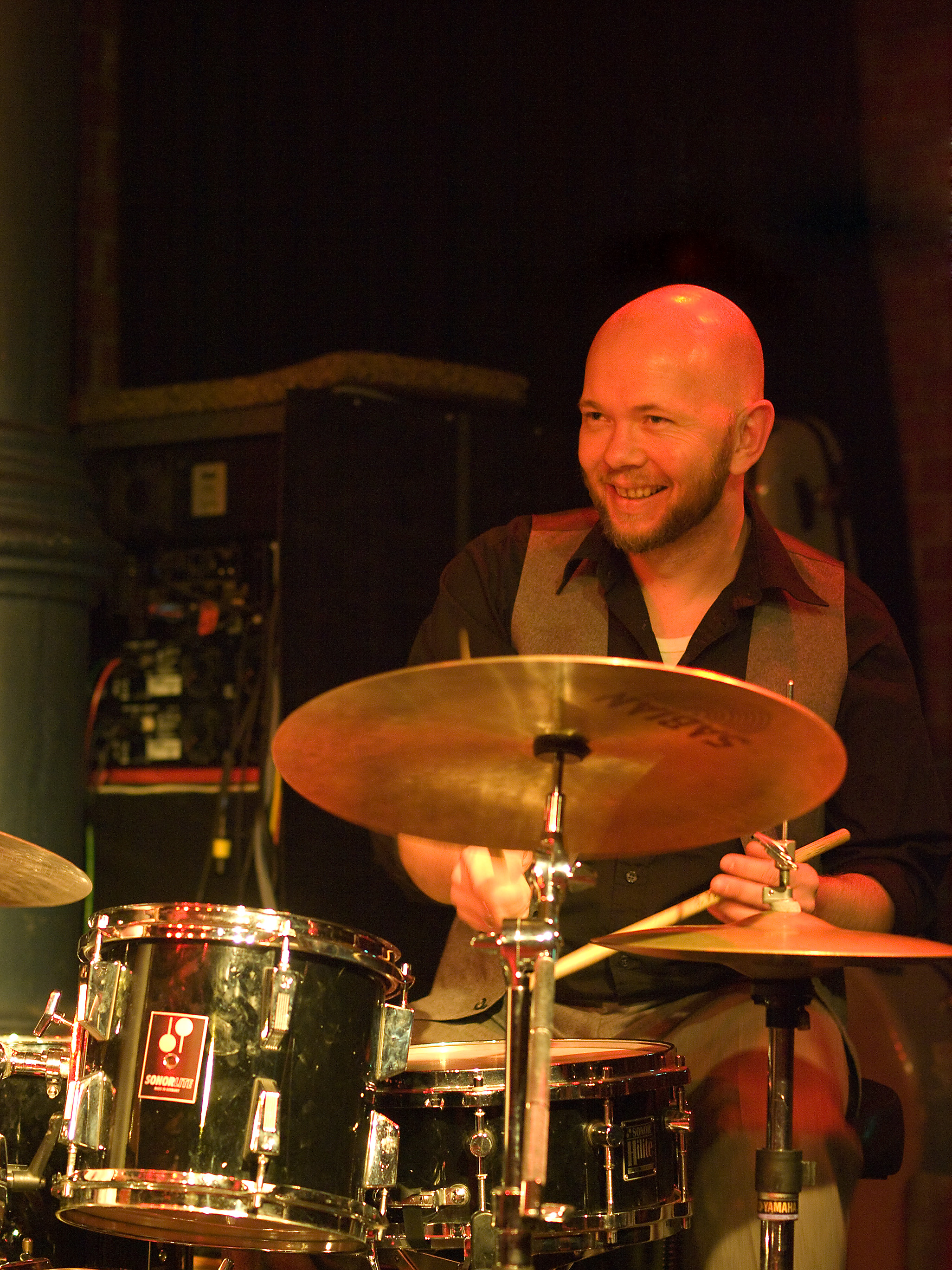
- Wike with Frøy Aagre live at the Jazz Club Unterfahrt, Munich, March 17, 2010.

Background information
- Born: Freddy Augdal Wike; 10 January 1976 (age 50); Lillehammer, Oppland
- Origin: Norway
- Occupation: Jazz musician
- Instrument: Drums
- Label: Aim Records
- Formerly of: Frøy Aagre Offbeat

Freddy Augdal Wike (born 10 January 1976) is a Norwegian Jazz musician (drums).

== Career ==
Wike played with Frøy Aagre on her three albums Katalyze (2004), Countryside (2006) and Cycle Of Silence (2010). His first recording Paralooped; Jennie Jones Part III (2001), was within D:Koder. He has also collaborated with Torbjørn Sletta Jacobsen Quintet at Oslo Jazzfestival in 2013.

== Personal life ==
Wike was born in Lillehammer but now lives in Oslo, and has been married since 14 May 2005 to Thea Wike (b. 1979).

== Discography ==
With D:Koder

- 2001: Paralooped; Jennie Jones Part III (Mercury Records)

With Frøy Aagre Offbeat

- 2004: Katalyze (Aim Records)
- 2006: Countryside (Aim Records)

With Kristin Sevaldsen Band

- 2007: Impressions (D'Label)

With Frøy Aagre

- 2010: Cycle Of Silence (ATC Records)
