= Sideways (Jacob Young album) =

Studio album by Jacob Young
- Released: November 2, 2007
- Recorded: May 2006
- Studio: Rainbow Studio; Oslo, Norway
- Genre: Improvised music, jazz
- Length: 56:18
- Label: ECM; ECM 1997
- Producer: Manfred Eicher

Jacob Young chronology
Evening Falls (2002)	Sideways (2007)	Anthem (2011)

Sideways is an album by Norwegian guitarist and composer Jacob Young recorded for ECM in May 2006 and released on November 2, 2007. Young's quintet features trumpeter Mathias Eick, reed player Vidar Johansen and rhythm section Mats Eilertsen and Jon Christensen.

== Reception ==
Professional ratings
Review scores
Source	Rating
AllMusic	4/5 stars

The AllMusic review by Matt Collar states, "Much like other ECM releases, with its mix of laid-back edginess and ambient, searching improvisations, Sideways works just as well on a cerebral, engaging level as on a background, afterglow level."

On All About Jazz, Budd Kopman observed, "Sideways is remarkable in how its many layers interact to produce music that combines beauty and intellectual rigor," while John Kelman wrote "Young's very strength is his ability to compel and evoke in the most understated fashion. The beautifully spacious Sideways finds him comfortably evolving, bringing together his personal biculturalism with a musical cosmopolitanism that transcends any single stylistic authority."

== Track listing ==
All compositions by Jacob Young

1. "Sideways" – 6:41
2. "Time Rebel" – 5:14
3. "Slow Bo-Bo" – 5:07
4. "Near South End" – 5:26
5. "Out of Night" – 10:16
6. "Hanna's Lament" – 4:02
7. "St. Ella" – 4:35
8. "Maybe We Can" – 6:53
9. "Wide Asleep" – 5:30
10. "Gazing at Stars" – 2:03

== Personnel ==
- Jacob Young – guitar
- Mathias Eick – trumpet
- Vidar Johansen – bass clarinet, tenor saxophone
- Mats Eilertsen – bass
- Jon Christensen – drums

=== Production ===
- Manfred Eicher – producer
- Jan Erik Kongshaug – engineer
- Sascha Kleis – design by
- Colin Eick – photographer
