= Forever Young (Jacob Young album) =

Studio album by Jacob Young
- Released: May 16, 2014
- Recorded: August 2013
- Studio: Rainbow Studio; Oslo, Norway
- Genre: Improvised music, jazz
- Length: 73:30
- Label: ECM 2366
- Producer: Manfred Eicher

Jacob Young chronology
InterStatic (2012)	Forever Young (2014)	Arise (2014)

Forever Young is an album by Norwegian guitarist and composer Jacob Young recorded in August 2013 and released on ECM May the following year. The quintet features saxophonist Trygve Seim and rhythm section Marcin Wasilewski, Slawomir Kurkiewicz and Michal Miskiewicz.

== Reception ==
Professional ratings
Review scores
Source	Rating
Allmusic	4/5 stars
All About Jazz	4.5/5 stars

The AllMusic review by Thom Jurek states: "Young's playing throughout offers great technical facility, but he is a democratic bandleader, never showy. Forever Young stands out in his catalog because it reveals an almost immeasurable growth in his compositional skills since 2007. These tunes inspire this fine band; they play as if they'd been playing them for ages."

In JazzTimes John Murph wrote: "The airy arrangements afford Young plenty of room to showcase his comely, full-bodied sound and his effortless manner of unraveling melodically cogent improvisations. His gifts as a composer are on full display as well, and he demonstrates an intriguing way of enveloping pop and rock motifs into soft-hued modern jazz."

On All About Jazz John Kelman noted "Forever Young demonstrates an ability to simmer in a way that his previous ECM recordings did not. It also represents a first outing by a quintet with plenty of potential; hopefully six years won't have to pass before this intimate yet delicately expressionistic quintet can once again reconvene."

== Track listing ==
All compositions by Jacob Young.

1. "I Lost My Heart to You" - 8:29
2. "Therese's Gate" - 6:44
3. "Bounce" - 7:46
4. "We Were Dancing" - 5:52
5. "Sofia's Dance" - 7:33
6. "Comeback Girl" - 7:01
7. "1970" - 6:34
8. "Beauty" - 6:11
9. "Time Changes" - 9:32
10. "My Brother"- 7:43

== Personnel ==
- Jacob Young – guitar
- Trygve Seim – tenor saxophone, soprano saxophone
- Marcin Wasilewski – piano
- Slawomir Kurkiewicz – bass
- Michal Miskiewicz – drums

Production and design

- Manfred Eicher – producer
- Jan Erik Kongshaug – engineer
- Design by Sascha Kleis – design
- Liner photos by Summer Krinsky – liner photos
