= Trygve Seim =

Norwegian jazz musician and composer

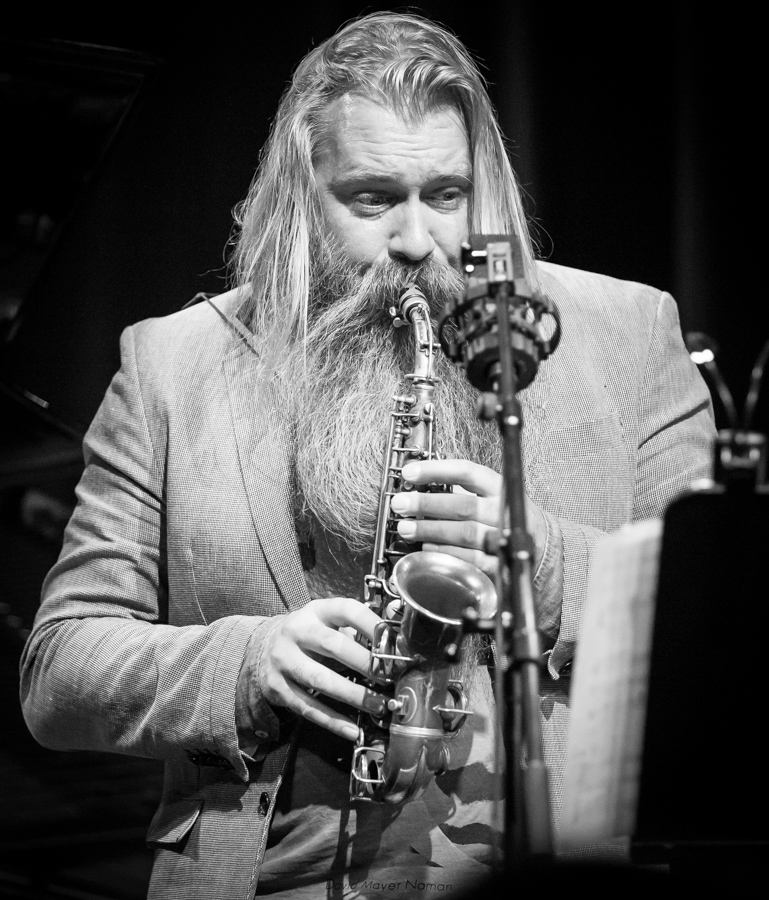
- Trygve Seim in 2016

Background information
- Born: 25 April 1971 (age 55); Oslo, Norway
- Origin: Norway
- Genres: Jazz
- Occupations: Musician, composer
- Instrument: Saxophone
- Labels: ECM, Curling Legs, Grappa, Odin
- Website: www.trygveseim.com

Trygve Seim (born 25 April 1971) is a Norwegian jazz saxophonist and composer. Seim has released numerous albums since 1992, including over 20 albums for ECM Records as a composer, band-leader or co-band-leader.

== Career ==
Seim was born in Oslo and in 1985 was inspired to learn saxophone upon hearing Jan Garbarek's Eventyr by chance on a family excursion. Seim went on to study music at Foss videregående skole (1987–90). In between his studies, Seim spent a year in nearby Denmark, during which time he began a short-lived group with pianist Carsten Dahl and became increasingly influenced by the playing of Dexter Gordon. Upon returning to Norway, Seim attended the Jazz program of the Trondheim Musikkonservatorium (1990–93), where he completed studies in jazz saxophone. Seim's jazz education was supplemented by participation in New York jam sessions during his frequent overseas trips to visit his father, who worked in the Norwegian diplomatic service.

In 1991, he founded the group Airamero with fellow student, the pianist Christian Wallumrød. Bassist Johannes Eick and drummer Per Oddvar Johansen completed the group line-up, and in 1994 their eponymously named album was released.

Seim became a member of Jon Balke's band Oslo 13 in 1992 and soon after was instrumental in forming the jazz quartet, The Source, with fellow Trondheim Musikkonservatorium alumni Øyvind Brække, Mats Eilertsen and Per Oddvar Johansen. Considered to be a highly creative ensemble, The Source released a series of critically successful albums, including several on ECM Records and have remained an active ensemble throughout Seim's career, collaborating with other musicians for specific projects, including Edward Vesala and Kenny Wheeler.

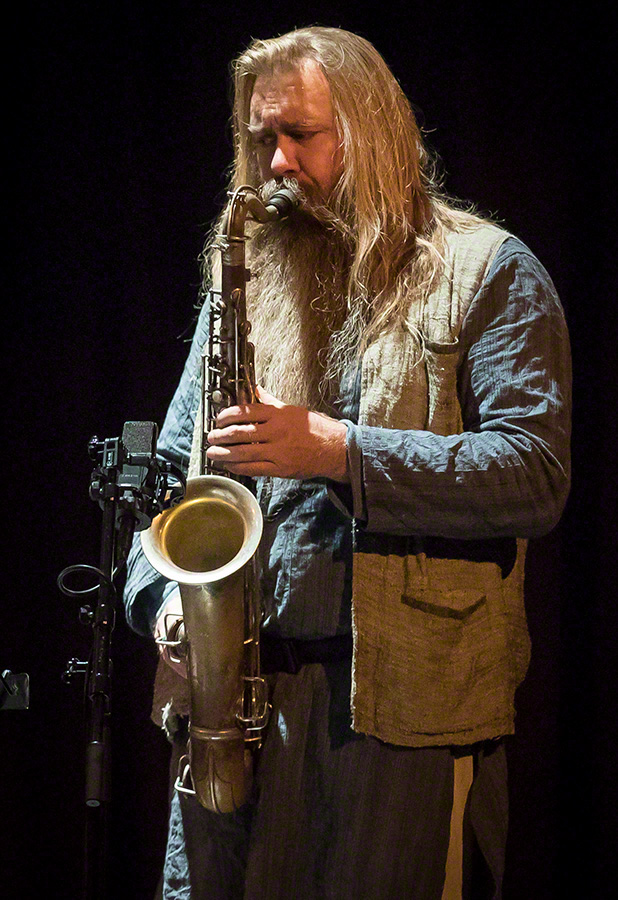
Trygve Seim at Cosmopolite in 2016

Seim's debut release as a leader came in 2000, with Different Rivers, released on the German record label ECM Records. Receiving positive reviews upon release, Different Rivers won the German Record Critics Prize, "Jahrespreis – Preis der Deutschen Schallplattenkritik" in 2001, and began Seim's long association with ECM Records, both as a leader and as a sideman, including for Jacob Young, Manu Katché, Iro Haarla, Sinikka Langeland, and Mats Eilertsen.

While jazz critics have suggested that Seim's performing and composing aligns within the ECM lineage, many have also noted that he has cultivated a unique style of performance and composition, making his work difficult to categorize. Seim is noted for making unconventional choices in his ensemble instrumentation, frequently using large ensembles but also working in smaller contexts, including duos. His unique contribution to the legacy of ECM recordings was celebrated in 2010 when his composition and arrangement, 'Ulrikas Dans', was selected for inclusion in Arild Andersen's Celebration album, alongside those of Keith Jarrett, Jan Garbarek, Dave Holland, Chick Corea, and Andersen himself. Recorded with Tommy Smith and the Scottish National Jazz Orchestra, Celebrations was devised as a contribution to ECM's 40th anniversary celebrations. He won Grammy Awards with Nidarosdomens jentekor, Trygve Seim & TrondheimSolistene Best Immersive Audio Album at the 62nd GRAMMY Awards 2020 (2L/Morten Lindberg) https://shop.2l.no/products/lux-nidarosdomen

== Personal life ==
Seim has two children with the Norwegian journalist and writer Åsne Seierstad (b. 1970).

== Discography ==
=== As leader/co-leader ===
- Christmas Songs w/Andreas Utnem (Grappa Musikkforlag GRCD 4573, 2022)
- ...But Swinging Doesn't Bend Them Down (Odin Records ODINCD9577, 2019)
- Helsinki Songs (ECM Records ECM 2607, 2018)
- Rumi Songs (ECM Records ECM 2449, 2016)
- The Source: of Summer (Grappa Musikkforlag GRCD 4416, 2013)
- Purcor w/Andreas Utnem (ECM Records ECM 2186, 2010)
- Yeraz w/Frode Haltli (ECM Records ECM 2044, 2008)
- The Source: of Christmas Live (Grappa Musikkforlag GRCD 4215, 2007)
- The Source (ECM Records ECM 1966, 2006)
- Sangam (ECM Records ECM 1797, 2004)
- The Source and Different Cikadas (ECM Records ECM 1764, 2002)
- Different Rivers (ECM Records ECM 1744, 2001)
- Decoy w/Decoy - Havard Lund / Njål Ølnes / Audun Kleive (Turn Left Productions TURNCD497, 1997)
- The Source: of Christmas (Curling Legs CLCD 63, 1996)
- Olemanns Kornett (Curling Legs CLPCD 10, 1994)
- Airamero w/Christian Wallumrød / Johannes Eick / Per Oddvar Johansen (ODIN Records NJ 40492, 1994)

=== As sideman/collaborator ===
With 1300 Oslo

- Live In The North (Curling Legs CLCD 63, 2001)

With Jon Balke Batagraf

- Delights Of Decay (Jazzland Recordings; Jazzland Norway – N° 21, 2018)
- Oslo 13 – Live (Curling Legs CLCD07, 1993)

Bodega Band

- En Flik Av... (Plateselskapet BBCD 005, 1992)

With Mats Eilertsen

- Rubicon (ECM Records ECM 2469, 2016)

With Harr & Hartberg

- Døden er dårlig gjort (Feber Records FEBERCD001, 2014)

With Iro Haarla

- Ante Lucem (ECM Records ECM 2457, 2016)
- Vespers (ECM Records ECM 2171, 2011)
- Northbound (ECM Records ECM 1918, 2005)

With Manu Katché

- Touchstone for Manu (ECM Records ECM 2419, 2014)
- Playground (ECM Records ECM 2016, 2007)

With Sinikka Langeland

- The Magical Forest (ECM Records ECM 2448, 2016)
- The Half-Finished Heaven (ECM Records ECM 2377, 2015)
- The Land That Is Not (ECM Records ECM 2210, 2011)
- Starflowers (ECM Records ECM 1996, 2007)

With Håvard Lund

- Letters (Turn Left Productions TURNCD 196, 1996)

With Geir Lysne Listening Ensemble

- Aurora Borealis (Groove Records GR 19932, 2000)

With Motorpsycho

- The MotorSource Massacre w/The Source (Stickman Records 3RD EAR 0200, 2000)
- Trust Us (Forward Records FWCD005, 1997)

With Odd Nordstoga Og Det Norske Kammerorkester

- Jul (Universal Music Group, 2018)
- Bestevenn (Sonet/Universal Music Group, 2011)

With Jørn Skogheim

- Above Water (Curling Legs CLCD 99, 2007)

With Squid

- Super (Forward Records FWCD005, 1998)

With Christian Wallumrød

- Sofienberg Variations (ECM Records ECM 1809, 2003)

With Petter Wettre

- Mystery Unfolds (Blå Productions/Universal BP 01009, 2001) with Jacob Young
- Forever Young (ECM Records ECM 2366, 2014)
- Glow (Curling Legs CLPCD 60, 2001)
- Pieces of Time (Curling Legs CLPCD 37, 1997)

Awards
Preceded by Silje Nergaard	Recipient of the Jazz Gammleng-prisen; 2006	Succeeded by The Brazz Brothers
