= Close Erase =

Norwegian jazz group

- Origin: Trondheim, Norway
- Genres: Jazz, electronica, experimental rock
- Years active: 1995–present
- Labels: NorCD, Jazzaway
- Members: Christian Wallumrød; Ingebrigt Håker Flaten; Per Oddvar Johansen

Close Erase (initiated 1995 in Trondheim, Norway) is a Norwegian jazz group, comprising Per Oddvar Johansen (drums), Ingebrigt Håker Flaten (bass) and Christian Wallumrød (piano).

== Biography ==
Close Erase play an experimental jazz fusion inspired by musicians like Paul Bley and Svein Finnerud. The first two album releases were Close Erase (1996) and No.2 (1999) on the label NorCD, with Audun Kleive as producer. They turned electric on the third album Dance This (2002) that was nominated for the Spellemannprisen and was acclaimed by the magazines The Wire and Jazzwise before their London debut September 10, 2002, and was "shocked by this highly original trio". The fourth album release was Sport Rocks (2006), with an increasingly hard-swinging and electronic style à la Supersilent.

== Discography ==
- 1996: Close Erase (NorCD)
- 1999: No. 2 (NorCD)
- 2002: Dance This (Bergland Produsjon)
- 2006: Sport Rocks (Jazzaway)

Compilation

- 2010: R.I.P. Complete Recordings 1995–2007 (Plastic Strip)
