= Evening Falls (album) =

Studio album by Jacob Young
- Released: August 31, 2004
- Recorded: December 2002
- Studio: Rainbow Studio; Oslo, Norway
- Genre: Improvised music, jazz
- Length: 50:14
- Label: ECM; ECM 1876
- Producer: Manfred Eicher

Jacob Young chronology
| Where Flamingos Fly (2002) | Evening Falls (2004) | Sideways (2008) |

Evening Falls is an album by Norwegian guitarist and composer Jacob Young recorded in December 2002 and released on ECM in August 2004.

== Reception ==
Professional ratings
Review scores
| Source | Rating |
|---|---|
| AllMusic | 4/5 stars |
| The Guardian | 3/5 stars |

AllMusic awarded the album 4 stars and in its review by Thom Jurek, states "What is immediately startling about Evening Falls is its lyricism, and how it doesn't sound like a guitarist's date. Young's compositions reflect the notion of song, overtly paying careful attention to nuance and dynamic. Inside his deep and winding lyricism is plenty of room for improvisation and group interplay."

The Guardian called it "A lyrical, softly swaying debut from a thirtysomething Norwegian acoustic and electric guitarist who, despite his youth, has worked with some of the luminaries of the Scandinavian scene."

For All About Jazz, John Kelman wrote "Evening Falls heralds the international arrival of an artist who, with a number of years behind him, has already developed a mature and personal approach. As a player, composer and bandleader he will clearly be someone to watch."

== Track listing ==
All compositions by Jacob Young except as indicated

1. "Blue" – 7:19
2. "Evening Air" – 6:48
3. "Minor Peace" – 6:19
4. "Looking for Jon" – 4:29
5. "Sky" – 5:00
6. "Presence of Descant" (Young, Jon Christensen) – 3:56
7. "Formerly" – 6:48
8. "The Promise" – 4:25
9. "Falling" – 4:47

== Personnel ==
- Jacob Young – guitar
- Mathias Eick – trumpet
- Vidar Johansen – bass clarinet, tenor saxophone
- Mats Eilertsen – bass
- Jon Christensen – drums

== Credits ==
- Engineered by Jan Erik Kongshaug
- Design by Sascha Kleis
- Liner photos by Colin Eick
- Produced by Manfred Eicher

== Notes ==
- Recorded at Rainbow Studio in Oslo, Norway in December 2002
