= Farmers Market (band) =

Norwegian band

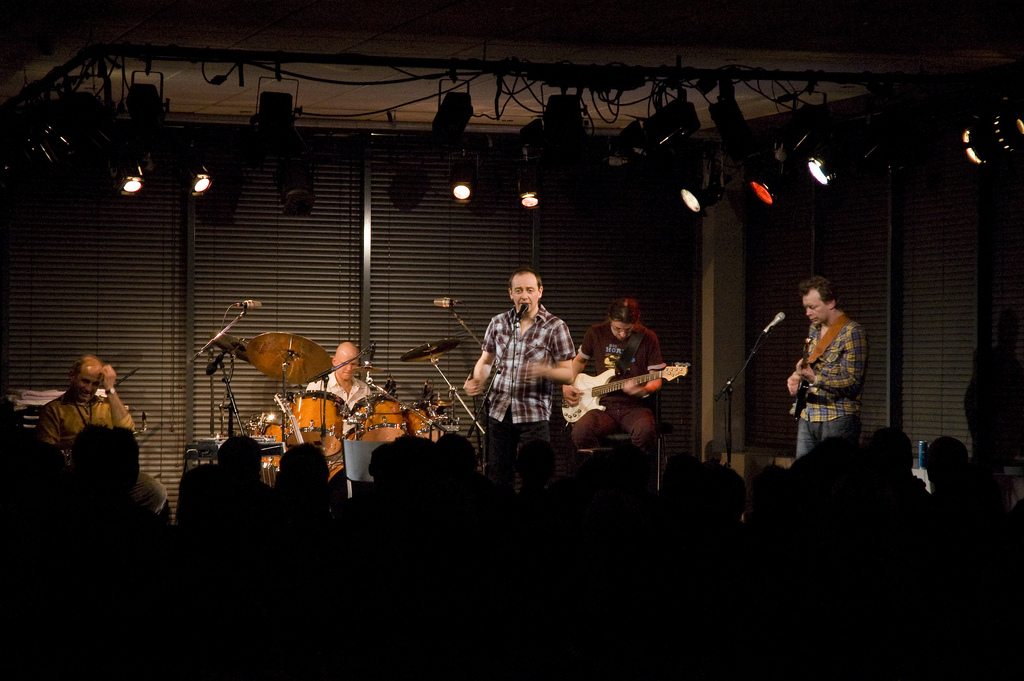
- Farmers Market in concert in Mo i Rana, Nordland, Norway. (2008; photo: Stig Aron Kamonen)

Background information
- Origin: Trondheim, Sør-Trøndelag, Norway
- Genres: Bulgarian rock, classical rock, folk rock, free jazz, jazz rock, bluegrass
- Years active: Since 1991
- Label: Ipecac Recordings
- Members: Stian Carstensen; Finn Guttormsen; Nils-Olav Johansen; Trifon Trifonov; Jarle Vespestad
- Past members: Håvard Lund
- Website: farmersmarketband.com

Farmers Market is a Norwegian band founded in Trondheim, Sør-Trøndelag, in 1991. They have released four studio albums.

== History ==
The band started out as a free jazz quintet sprung out from the conservatory in Trondheim, but now incorporates a wide variety of genres, such as jazz, rock, pop music, bluegrass, classical and – most significantly – Bulgarian folk music. Humorous arrangements, virtuosity and odd time signatures are characteristic to their style. Multi-instrumentalist Stian Carstensen is a sort of front figure, though guitarist Nils-Olav Johansen performs most of the lead vocals.

The band's original saxophonist Håvard Lund left the group in 1995, and they looked to Bulgaria for a replacement. Trifon Trifonov joined the band after auditioning by telephone.

They have performed at several international jazz festivals, including the Kongsberg Jazzfestival (in 1993, 1995 and 2009), Moldejazz (in 1994, 2003, 2004 and 2010), the North Sea Jazz Festival (in The Hague, Netherlands, in 2004) and the Berliner Festspiele (in 2005).

The band's debut album, Speed/Balkan/Boogie, was released in 1995. It is a live recording from two concerts held at Moldejazz 1994 with members from Grammy Award-winning Bulgarian female vocal group Le Mystère des Voix Bulgares and two Bulgarian folk musicians.

Their fourth studio album, Surfin' USSR, was awarded an open-class Spellemannpris (Norwegian Grammy Award equivalent) in 2008. It was released on Ipecac Recordings, a label distributed by the Universal Music Group.

The band has collaborated with several Norwegian orchestras, including the Norwegian Radio Orchestra, the Stavanger Symphony Orchestra, the Trondheim Symphony Orchestra and the Kristiansand Symphony Orchestra. They have also collaborated with American jazz saxophonist and composer Michael Brecker.

== Members ==
- Trifon Trifonov – alto saxophone and clarinet (since 1995)
- Stian Carstensen – accordion, kaval, gaida, guitar, pedal steel guitar, banjo and vocals
- Nils-Olav Johansen – guitar and vocals
- Jarle Vespestad – drums
- Finn Guttormsen – bass guitar

=== Past member ===
- Håvard Lund – alto saxophone (1991–1995)

== Honors ==
- Spellemannprisen 2008, Open class
- Spellemannprisen 2012, Open class

== Discography ==
=== Albums ===
- 1995: Speed / Balkan / Boogie
- 1997: Musikk fra Hybridene (Music from the Hybrids) (Kirkelig Kulturverksted)
- 2000: Farmers Market (Winter & Winter)
- 2008: Surfin' USSR (Ipecac Recordings)
- 2012: Slav to the Rhythm (Division Records)

== See also ==
- List of bluegrass musicians
- List of folk musicians
- List of free improvising musicians and groups
- List of jazz musicians
- List of Norwegian musicians
- Music of Norway

Awards
Preceded by Live Maria Roggen	Recipient of the Open-Class Spellemannprisen; 2008	Succeeded by Kristin Asbjørnsen
Preceded by Bárut – Inga Juuso	Recipient of the Open-Class Spellemannprisen; 2012	Succeeded by Susanna and Ensemble Neon
