= Skogheim =

Skogheim is a surname. Notable people with the surname include:

- Dag Skogheim (1928–2015), Norwegian teacher, poet, novelist, short story writer, biographer and non-fiction writer
- Jørn Skogheim (born 1970), Norwegian multi-instrumentalist musician and composer
- Vegard Skogheim (born 1966), Norwegian football coach and former midfielder
