= Lars Andreas Haug =

Norwegian jazz musician (born 1975)

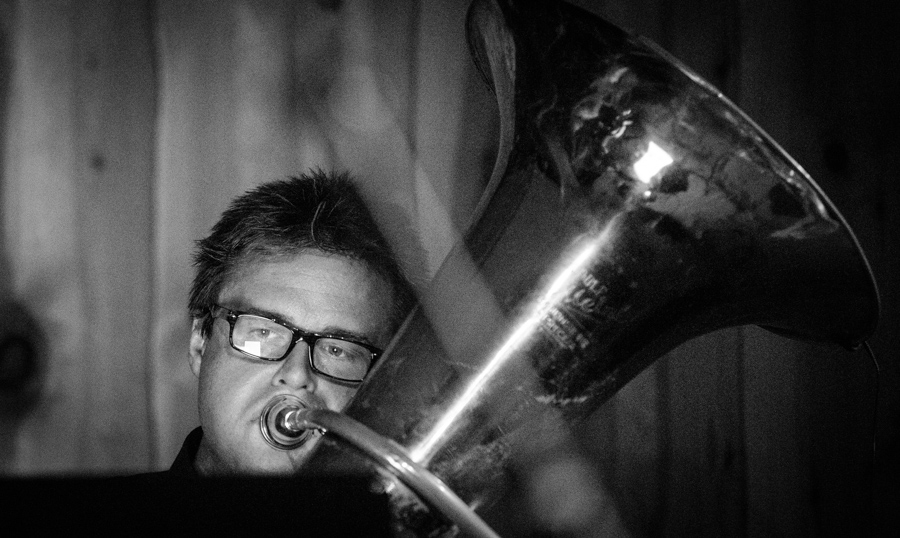
- Haug in 2017

Background information
- Born: 12 April 1975 (age 51); Frogner, Sørum, Akershus
- Origin: Norway
- Genres: Jazz
- Occupations: Musician, composer, band leader
- Instrument: Tuba
- Website: www.larsandreas.no

Lars Andreas Haug (born 12 April 1975) is a Norwegian jazz musician (tuba), known from a variety of jazz groups and recordings.

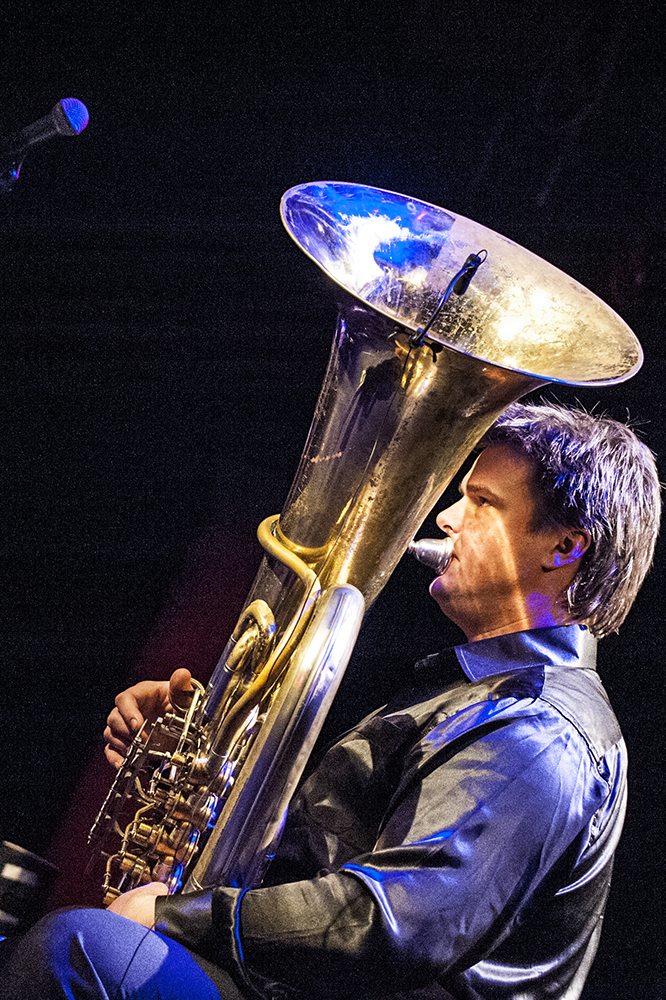
Norwegian musical project AKKU 5 performing at the OCH-Teatr in Warsaw, Poland - December 2011.

== Career ==
Haug was born in Frogner, Akershus. He obtained his Examen artium from the Music program at Rud High School and a Master's at Norges Musikkhøgskole, the Norwegian Academy of Music (1994–2001). He has been active contributor as a composer in many groups. With the acoustic trio Tri O'Trang (Tri ó trang) he cooperates with Helge Lien (piano) and Torben Snekkestad (saxophones). They have released the recordings Liker (2000), Fordivi (2002), Plays Jon Eberson (2005) and Må (2006). In duo cooperation with Live Maria Roggen he released Tu'Ba (1998).

With the band 1300 Oslo he released a live album Live in the north in 2001 and has been a regular member of the etno-jazz trio Akku from 1996, in a cooperation with the joiker Elfi Sverdrup and the jazz singer Ruth Wilhelmine Meyer. The latter released the albums Akku in 2001. With the trio Moment's Notice featuring Knut Aalefjær (drums) og Vidar Sæther (saxophones), he released the record Moment's notice (2003) and Sorryhappy (2005). In addition, he has been an active member of the band Trygve Seim Ensemble with releases like Sangam (ECM, 2004).

He received Statens arbeidsstipend (Norwegian Government artist grant) in 2004–06. In the same period he taught at the Norges Musikkhøgskole as an improvisation and principal instrument teacher.

With wind orchestra, Haug presents his own compositions on the record Vinterfjøs (Curling Legs, 2005). Here he pick up on his long lasting cooperation with saxophonist Trygve Seim, in addition to Per Oddvar Johansen (drums) and Mats Eilertsen (bass). In 2008 the release of pieces for quintet with the bassoon and trombone followed on the album Fabatune. He toured extensively in Norway for Rikskonsertene (2006), with a solo concert, Luft og kjærlighet, presenting wind instruments for a young audience in, often primary school classes. In 2009 he performed several concerts in Egypt with Trygve Seim and Frode Barth.

Haugen now works with the orchestras Lars Andreas Haug Quintet and LA Band.

== Musical family ==
Lars Andreas Haug is married to singer and songwriter Camilla Susann Haug, with whom he's done several musical performances, like "Messing With Voice". She's also part of the Lars Andreas Haug Band. Their son, Oscar Andreas Haug, is a jazz trumpet player.

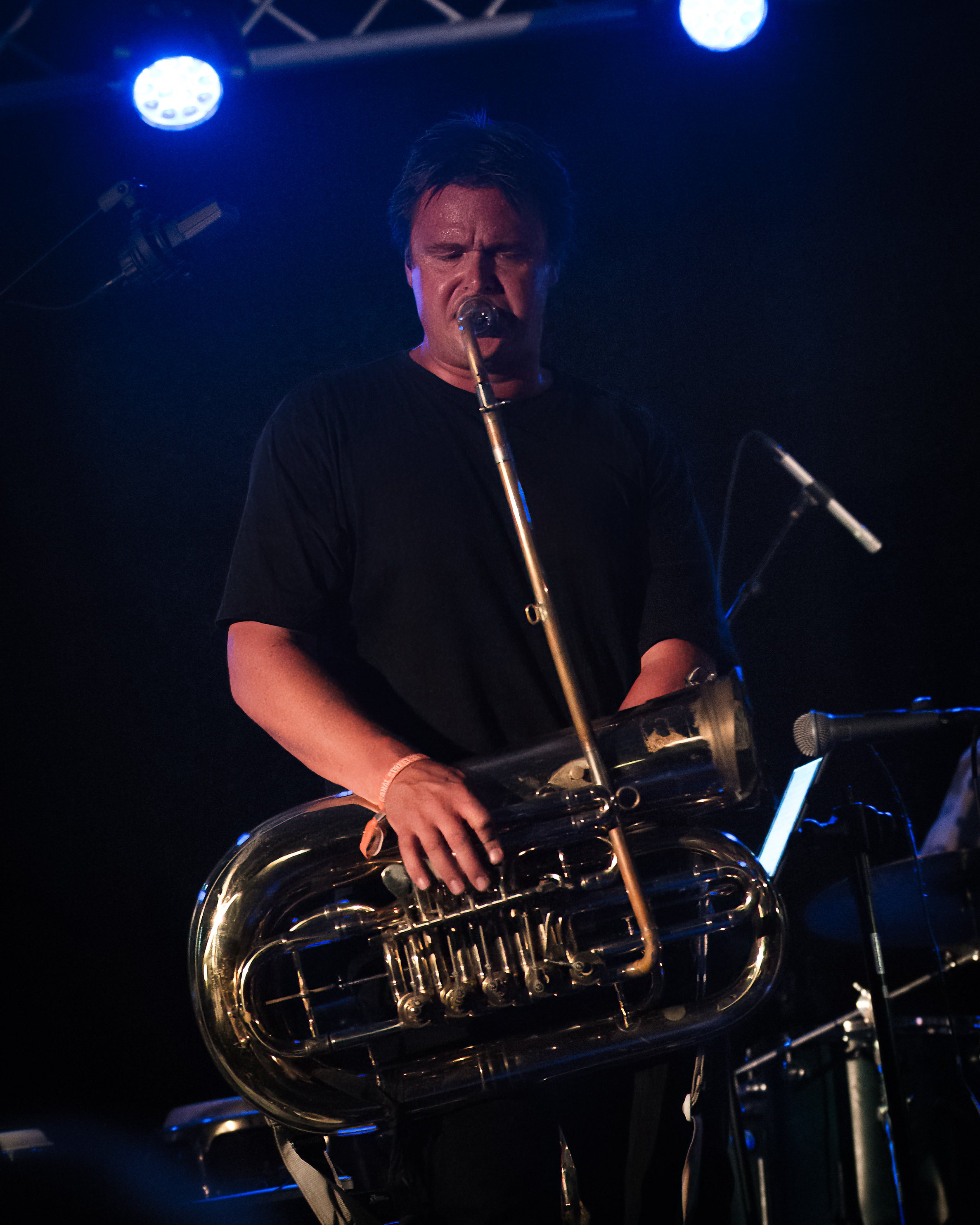
Haug playing his tubmarine in 2016

== Tubmarine ==
Haug has created a one-of-a-kind instrument: a tubmarine. It was designed out of necessity when he was playing with the progrock-band SOT, and it got its name because of its appearance, featuring a long “periscope.”

== Discography ==
- 2005: Vinterfjøs (Curling Legs)
- 2008: Fabatune (Curling Legs)
- 2015: Soul Twins (Glacier Records), with Steffen Schorn
