= Mathilde Grooss Viddal =

Norwegian musician and composer

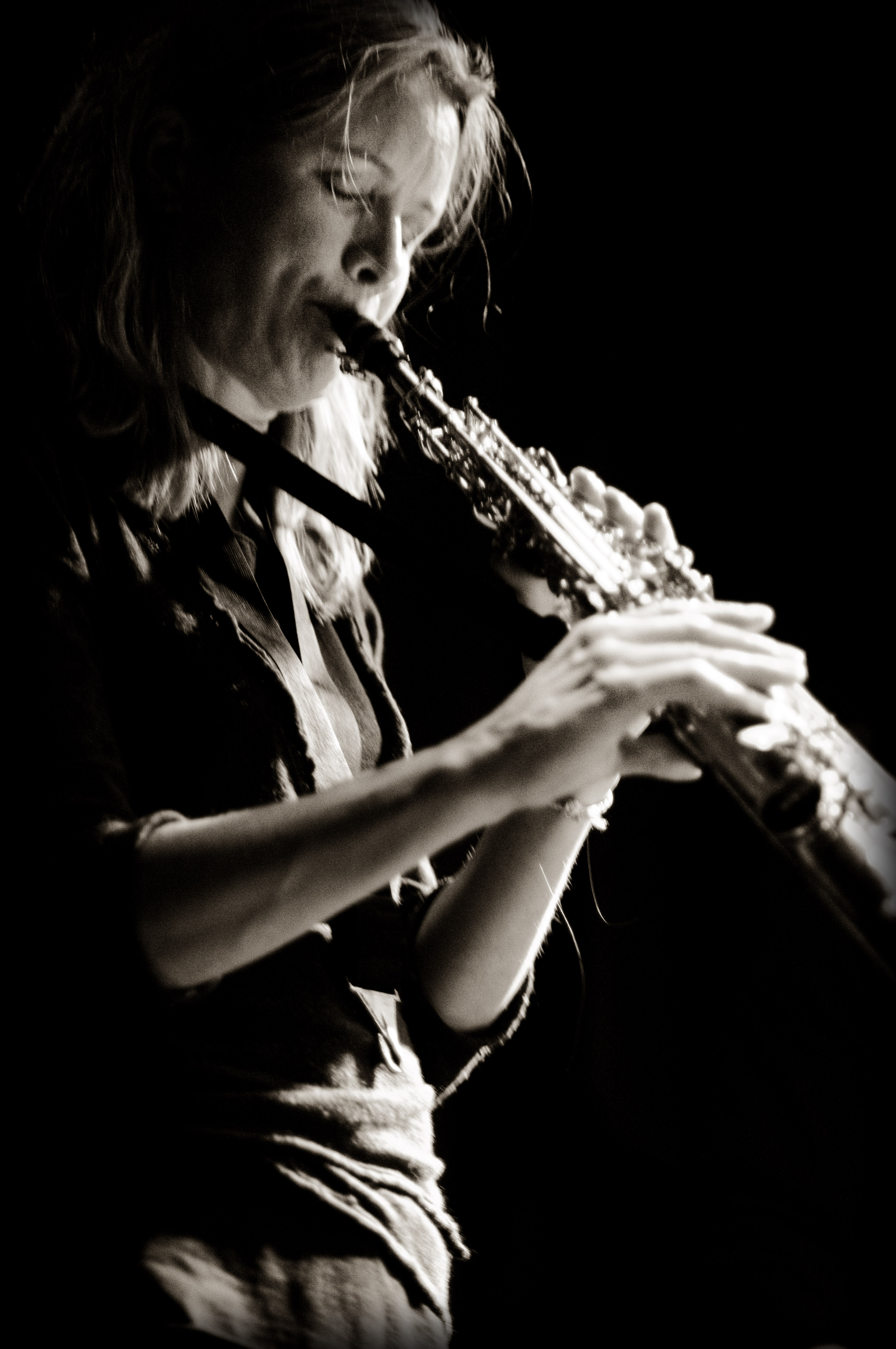

Background information
- Born: 6 May 1969 (age 57); Oslo, Norway
- Genres: Jazz, contemporary music
- Occupations: Musician, composer
- Instruments: Saxophone, clarinet
- Labels: Grappa Music; Giraffa Records
- Member of: Friensemblet; Lucky Loop; Eick/Viddal Duo
- Website: www.mgviddal.com

Mathilde Grooss Viddal (born 6 May 1969) is a Norwegian musician (saxophone and clarinet) and composer, known as the leader of Friensemblet and as member of bands like Lucky Loop and Eick/Viddal Duo.

== Career ==
Viddal was born in Oslo. She released albums Undergroove (2012) with her band Friensemblet, including live takes at Victoria, the Norwegian Nasjonal Jazzscene in Oslo, where she presents her more or less uklassifiserbare compositions, representing free spirited contemporary music full of improvisation and freewheeling elements. The collaboration was formed in 2004 by the name Chateau Neuf Friensemble, with a history from the 1960s University Big Band and the musical environment surrounding the Department of Musicology at University of Oslo. She also runs her own record label Giraffa Records. With Trude Eick she cooperates in the Eick/Viddal Duo and released the album November Log (2008).

== Discography ==
Friensemblet/Chateau Neuf Fri Ensemble

- 2006: Holding Balance (Giraffa Records)
- 2009: ComeCloser (Giraffa Records)
- 2012: Undergroove (Giraffa Records)

Eick/Viddal Duo

- 2008: November Log (Giraffa Records)
