= Frøy Aagre =

Norwegian jazz saxophonist

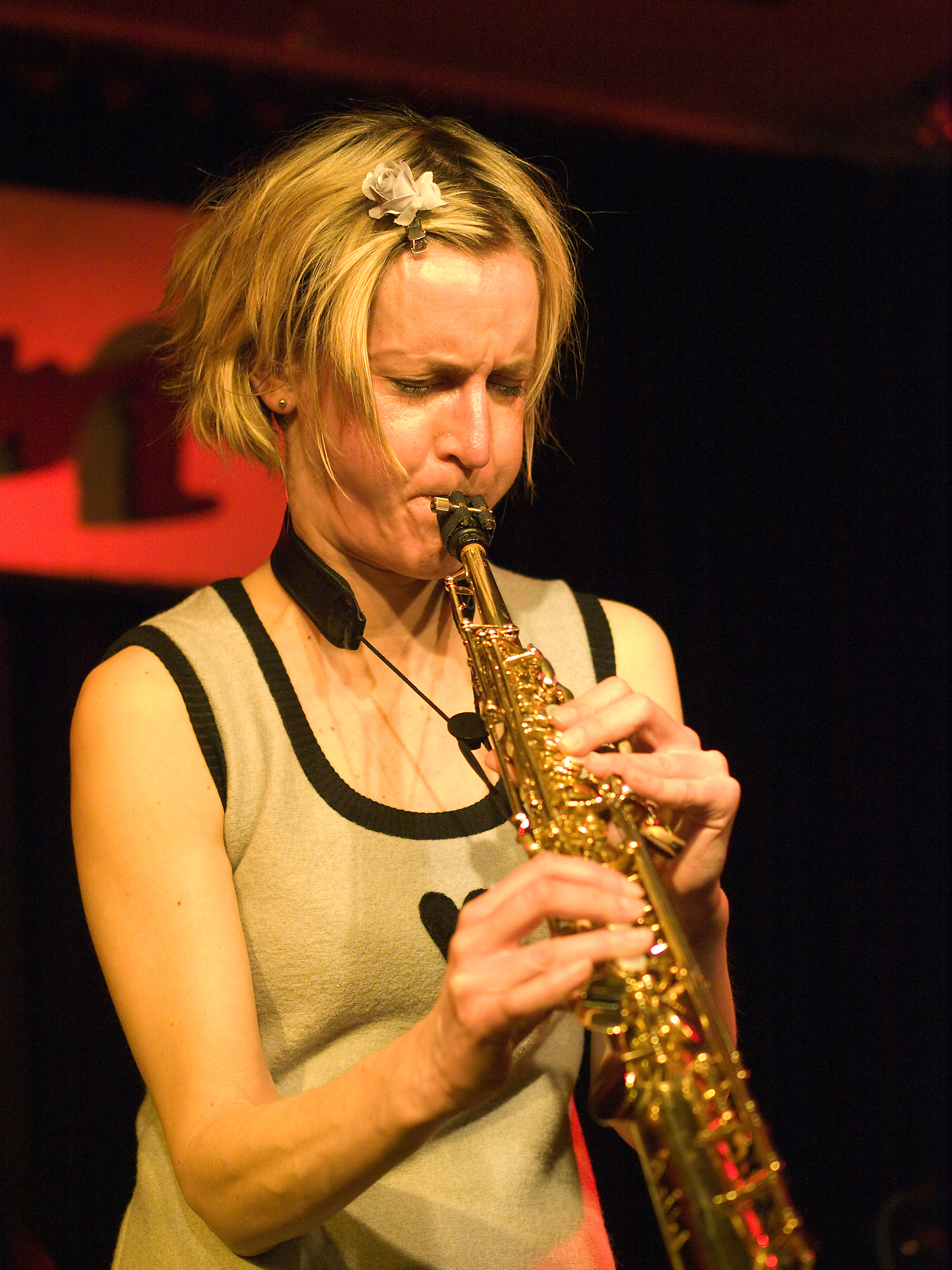
- Aagre at Jazz Club Unterfahrt, Munich, 2010.

Background information
- Born: 8 June 1977 (age 48); Tønsberg, Vestfold
- Origin: Norway
- Genres: Jazz
- Occupation(s): Musician, composer
- Instrument(s): Tenor, soprano saxophone
- Labels: Aim Records, ACT Records, momentum rec.
- Website: www.froyaagre.com

Frøy Aagre (born 8 June 1977 in Tønsberg, Norway) is a Norwegian jazz saxophonist.

== Career ==
Aagre is one of the leading saxophonists of Norway, playing tenor and soprano saxophone with an individual sound that builds on inspirations by such saxophonists as Dave Liebman and Wayne Shorter. She has studied saxophone and composition in Oslo, Birmingham, London, New York and Buenos Aires. Aagre was awarded the Norwegian Government scholarship for the year 2005/2006.

Aagre released her first album Katalyze in 2004 with Frøy Aagre Offbeat, including Andreas Ulvo, Freddy Augdal and Roger Williamsen, and attracted notice throughout Europe, and soon found herself invited to perform at major festivals in Europe, North America and India. Thereafter followed Countryside (2006) and Cycle of Silence (2010), both receiving great reviews. When attending the Banff Jazz Workshop in Canada, in 2005, Aagre started a collaboration with the Brisbane band Misinterprotato (now known as Trichotomy). This led to touring with the trio, including an appearance at Wangaratta Jazz Festival in 2009.

== Discography ==
=== Solo albums ===
With Frøy Aagre Offbeat

- 2004: Katalyze (Aim Records)
- 2006: Countryside (Aim Records)

As Frøy Aagre

- 2010: Cycle of Silence (ACT Records)

As Frøy Aagre Electric

- 2013: Frøy Aagre Electric (momentum rec.)
