= Christian Wallumrød =

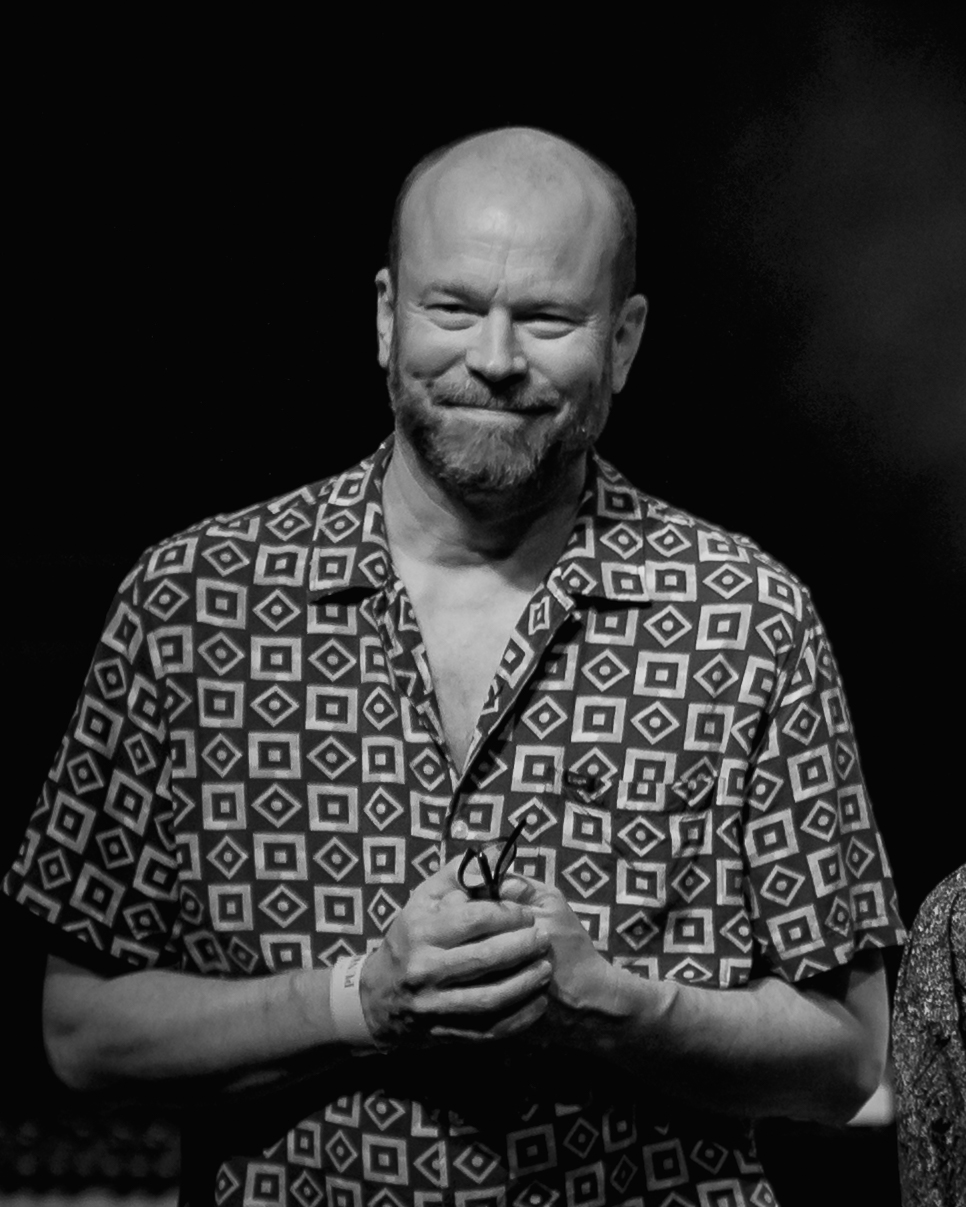
- Wallumrød at Punktfestivalen 2025

Background information
- Born: 26 April 1971 (age 55); Kongsberg, Buskerud, Norway
- Genres: Jazz
- Occupations: Musician, composer
- Instruments: Piano, organ, electronic keyboards
- Years active: 1993–present
- Label: ECM Records
- Member of: Close Erase, Christian Wallumrød Ensemble
- Formerly of: Airamero
- Website: christianwallumrod.com

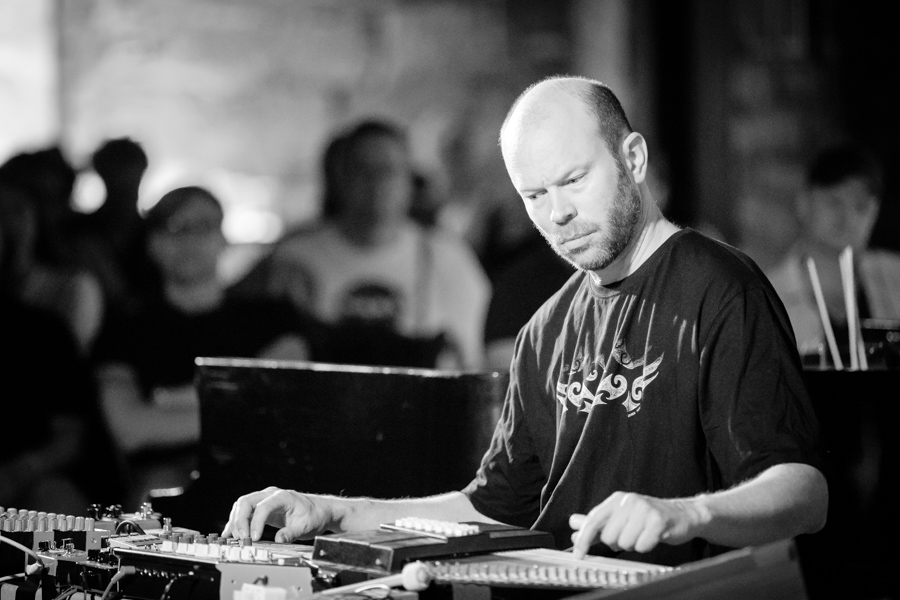
Wallumrød performing in 2018 Photo: Tore Sætre

Christian Wallumrød (born 26 April 1971 in Kongsberg, Norway) is a Norwegian jazz musician (piano, organ and electronic keyboards) and composer, and is considered one of the most prominent musicians of the younger Norwegian generation, known from releases with his own Christian Wallumrød Ensemble on the German label ECM Records, while regularly touring and appearing in festivals in Norway, elsewhere in Scandinavia and Europe, and in the US. He is the brother of jazz vocalist Susanna Wallumrød and the drummer Fredrik Wallumrød, and cousin to the pianist David Wallumrød.

== Career ==
Wallumrød was educated on the Jazz Program at Trondheim Musikkonservatorium, where he cooperated with the bands Airamero, Nutrio together with Eldbjørg Raknes and Arve Henriksen, as well as in a trio with drummer Espen Rud and bassist Johannes Eick, among others. After moving to Oslo he has played in a quartet with Petter Wettre, composed the commissioned work Eight Thirty for Kongsberg Jazz Festival with Ståle Storløkken (1994), and operated the trio Close Erase with Ingebrigt Håker Flaten (bass) and Per Oddvar Johansen (drums), with four releases. He has also contributed on recordings within a wide range of musical expressions, like Odd Børretzen & Lars Martin Myhre (Noen ganger er det all right, 1995), Jon Eberson's Jazzpunkensemblet (Thirteen Rounds, 1997), Jacob Young (Glow, 1999), with Arve Henriksen, Jan Bang and Erik Honoré (Birth wish, 2000), and last but not the leased Audun Kleive's Generator X (Generator X, 2000)

Wallumrød has continued the cooperation with Henriksen, in a trio with Hans-Kristian Kjos Sørensen with the albums No birch (1997) and Birth wish (2001), and in his own Christian Wallumrød Ensemble with Per Oddvar Johansen (trommer) releasing Sofienberg variations (2003) and A year from easter (2005), all on the German label ECM.

In the autumn 2006, he toured with his own Christian Wallumrød Sextet, consisting of the personnel from his Christian Wallumrød Ensamble reinforced with string trio Tanja Orning (cello), Gjermund Larsen (violin) and Giovanna Pessi (harp). The partnership include Ketil Gutvik, Sidsel Endresen and Jan Bang, resulting in a series of album releases. On his latest albums Fabula Suite Lugano (2009) and Outstairs (2013) with the ensemble, he leads a virtuoso ensemble at low speed. The albums combines recognizable melodies and simple harmonies with idea-based compositions where the musicians' improvising abilities are expressed.

John Kellman of the All About Jazz magazine recognized Christian Wallumrød Ensemble's appearance at TD Ottawa Jazz Festival June 2013, as no. 8 of his "Best Live Shows of 2013".

== Honors ==
- 2001: Kongsberg Jazz Award

== Discography ==
=== Solo albums ===
- 2015: Pianokammer (Hubro Music)
- 2021: Speaksome (Hubro Music)

=== As Band Leader ===
With Christian Wallumrød Trio

- 1998: No Birch (ECM)

With Christian Wallumrød Ensemble

- 2001: Sofienberg Variations (ECM)
- 2004: A Year From Easter (ECM)
- 2007: The Zoo Is Far (ECM)
- 2009: Fabula Suite Lugano (ECM)
- 2013: Outstairs (ECM)
- 2016: Kurzsam And Fulger (Hubro Music)

=== Collaborations ===
With Close Erase

- 1996: Close Erase (NorCD)
- 1999: No. 2 (NorCD)
- 2001: Dance This (Blå Production)
- 2006: Sport Rocks (Jazzaway)

With Audun Kleives Generator X

- 2000: Generator X (Jazzland)
- 2004: Ohmagoddabl (Jazzland)
- 2012: Attack (POLselection)

With Karl Seglem

- 2004: Nye Nord (NorCD)
- 2004: New North (NorCD)

With others

- 1994: Airamero (Odin Records), with Airamero
- 1995: Noen Ganger Er Det All Right (Tylden), with Odd Børretzen and Lars Martin Myhre
- 1997: Thirteen Rounds (Curling Legs), with Jon Eberson's Jazzpunkensemble
- 1997: Fra Himmelen (NorCD), with Elin Rosseland and Johannes Eick
- 2000: Birth Wish (Pan M Records), with Arve Henriksen, Jan Bang and Erik Honoré
- 2001: Glow (Curling Legs), with Jacob Young
- 2002: Objects Of Desire (Albedo), Oslo Sinfonietta conducted by Christian Eggen and music composed by Eivind Buene, featuring Christian Wallumrød and Torben Snekkestad
- 2004: Merriwinkle (Jazzland), with Sidsel Endresen and Helge Sten
- 2006: Dans Les Arbres (ECM), with Xavier Charles, Ivar Grydeland and Ingar Zach

Awards
Preceded by Petter Wettre	Recipient of the Kongsberg Jazz Award; 2001	Succeeded by Håkon Kornstad Trio including Paal Nilssen-Love & Mats Eilertsen
