= Bodega Band =

Norwegian jazz orchestra

- Origin: Trondheim, Norway
- Genres: Jazz; Big band
- Years active: 1929–present
- Label: Studentersamfundet i Trondhjem

Bodega Band (established 1929 in Trondheim, Norway) is a Norwegian jazz orchestra based in Trondheim, and part of "Studentersamfundets Orkester" at the Studentersamfundet i Trondhjem. The original sextet was established during the student festival UKA in Trondheim and was led by Johan David Behrends.

== Original band members ==
- Arnfinn Hjulstad (tenor banjo)
- Johan David Behrens (violin og orkesterleder)
- Arvid Ruud (batteri)
- Leif Berg Jansen (kornett and trompet)
- Hans Sørum (piano)
- Erik Müller (tenor sax)

The home scene was the Bodegaen at the Student Union, but the orchestra also toured around Norway. The band was one of the very few female jazz musicians, the pianist Inger "Mikro" Michelsen. Bodega Band worked as a cabaret band during UKA until the World War II frequent guested Sweden.

From 1945, the leader and organizer Ragnvald Sexe was central to the expansion to a 12-piece orchestra. After a period of hibernation, there was a new impetus in 1958, with the conductor Jostein Gjersvik. Later Asbjørn Krokstad (trombone) and drummer Bonsak Schieldrop (1959–64) developed the band to a 17-man crew after model of Count Basie. They were considered one of the four to five key big band with jazz standards as repertoire in Norway.

Around 1970, Jan Tro was conductor, and together with Per Husby (piano and arranger) they were central to a change of course with a greater element of own written music, assisted by performers and writers like Lars Martin Thomassen (flugelhorn), Eirik Lie/Tor Halmrast (guitar), Torgeir Døssland (alto saxophone and clarinet). A highlight was the visit in 1972 by musical instructor Clark Terry.

== Other band members in the 1970's ==
- Hans Petter Usterud (trompet),
- Øivind Owren (trompet),
- Johan Inge Marcussen (trompet),
- Liv Schou (trompet),
- Kjell Oversand (trompet),
- Jan Erik Johansen (trompet),
- Thor Johansson (trompet),
- Jarle Førde (trompet, flugelhorn),
- Per Gamre (trombone),
- Jan Ivar Bruheim (trombone)
- Jan Eriksen (trombone),
- Atle Døssland (trombone),
- Georg Hagen (trombone),
- Inge Brækhus (trombone),
- Trond Indergård (trombone),
- Rolf Olstad (trombone)
- Helge Førde (trombone)
- Tore Engstrøm (alto saxophone, flute, recorder)
- Torgeir Døssland (alto saxophone, clarinet)
- Per Kvistad Uddu (alto saxophone, clarinet)
- Terje Knudsen (tenor saxophone)
- Nils Tro (tenor saxophone)
- Olav Hauso (tenor saxophone)
- John Pål Inderberg (tenor saxophone)
- Tor Ramstad (baryton saxophone, soprano saxophone)
- Arne Linjordet (drums)
- Carl Haakon Waadeland (drums)
- Knut Lauritzen (instructor and conductor)

In this period the Bodega band also toured to Reykjavík (1978), performed at Moldejazz (1977) and at the "Festspillene i Nord-Norge" (1973). They also released three records with their own music on label Studentersamfundet i Trondhjem (1973, 74 and 77).

The band has since the establishment of the Jazz program at Trondheim Musikkonservatorium gained a wider array of performers. Jarle Førde was the leader from 1981. Vigleik Storaas was the leader a time from 1990, when the band was reorganized. Eldbjørg Raknes (vocals) and David Gald (tuba) was also in the lineup.

== Discography ==
- 1973: Bodega Band (Studentersamfundet i Trondhjem)
- 1974: Bodega Band 2 (Studentersamfundet i Trondhjem)
- 1977: Bodega Band 3 (Studentersamfundet i Trondhjem)
- 1987: Bodega Band Vol. IV, (Studentersamfundet i Trondhjem)
- 1992: En flik av...
- 2003: Aérien Voyage, various artists
- 2005: Footprints: Jazz in Norway vol.5: 1970-1980, various artists
