= Per Oddvar Johansen =

Norwegian jazz drummer (born 1968)

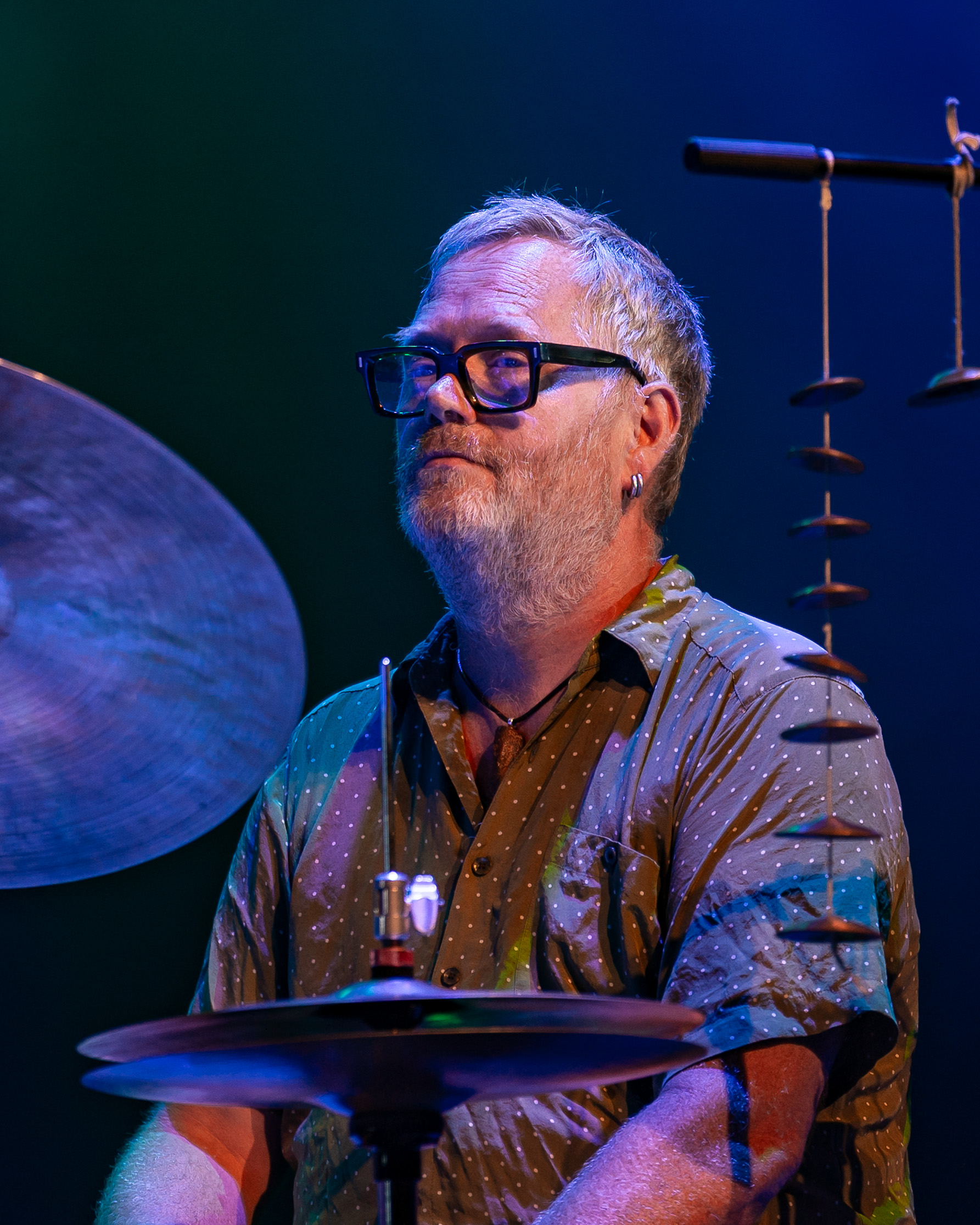
- Johansen with Espen Berg at the 2025 Canal Street festival (Norway).

Background information
- Born: 1 March 1968 (age 58); Oslo
- Origin: Norway
- Genres: Jazz
- Occupations: Musician, composer
- Instrument: Drums
- Website: Official website

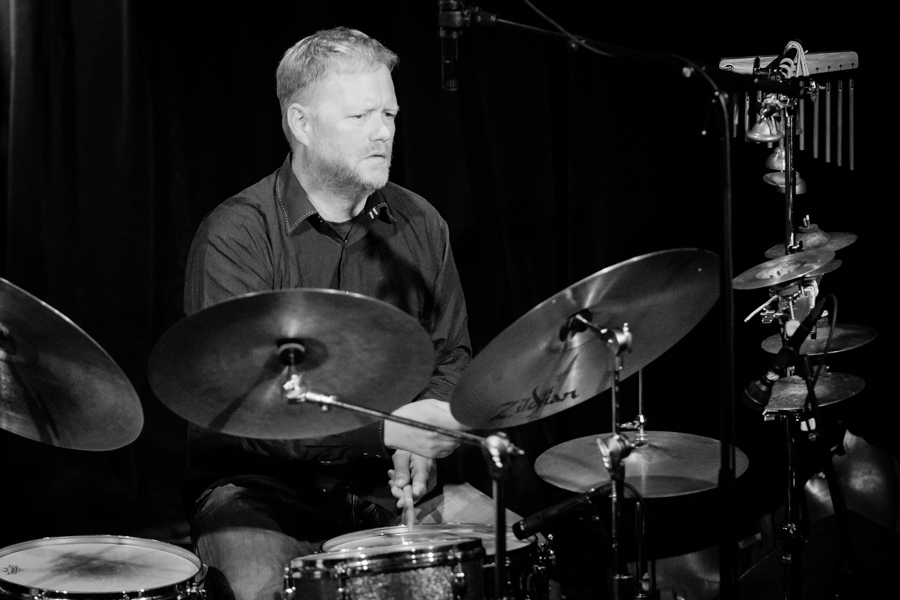
Johansen in concert in 2018.

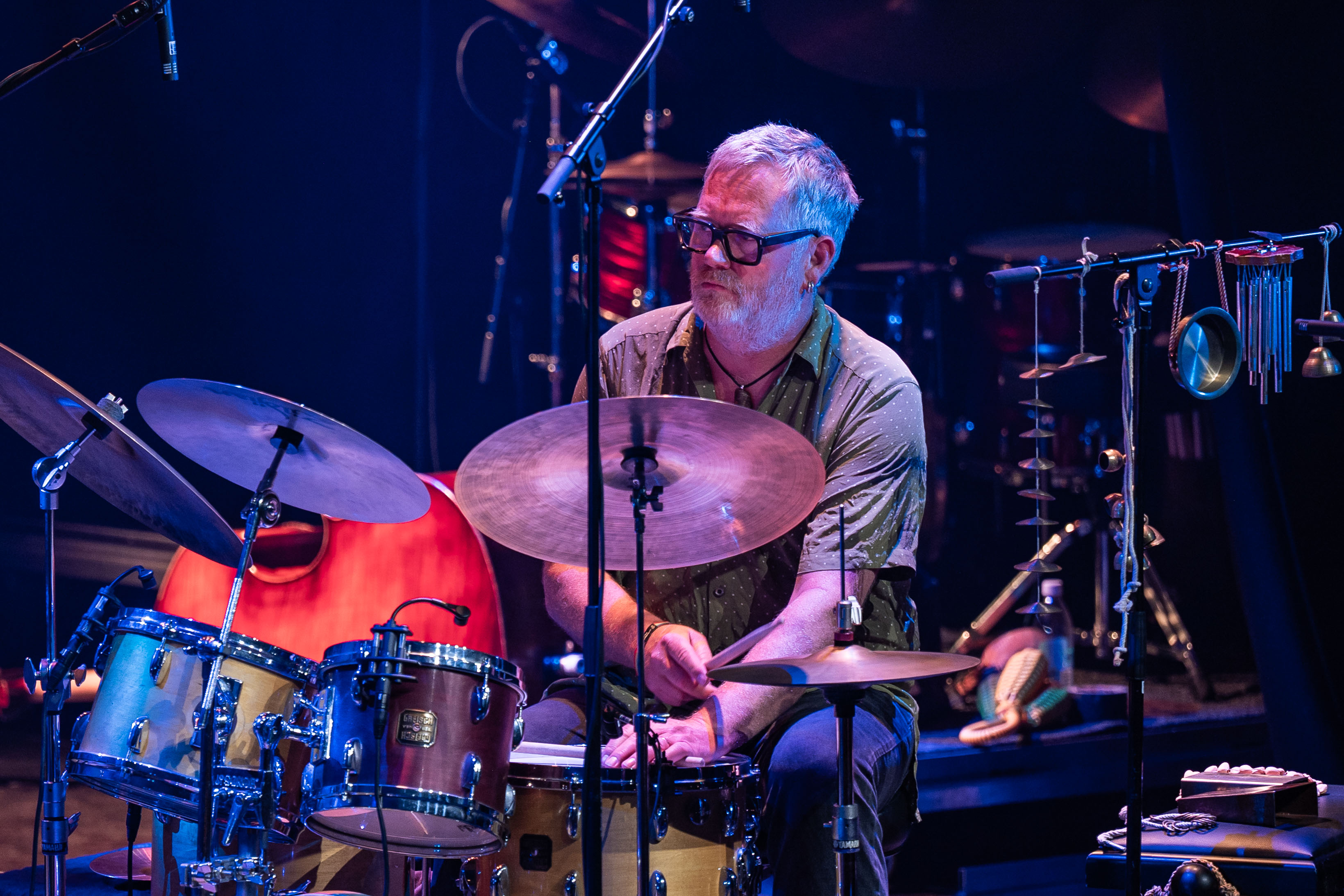
Johansen (2025)

Per Oddvar Johansen (born 1 March 1968) is a Norwegian Jazz musician (drummer), most recognized for his work with Trygve Seim, Christian Wallumrød, The Source, Solveig Slettahjell and Vigleik Storaas, but has also been awarded the Spellemannprisen five times.

== Career ==
Johansen was born in Oslo, where he played in several rock bands before attending the Jazz Program at Trondheim Music Conservatory (1989–92). There he started cooperations with among others the Bodega Band (1990–92, with the record En flik av ... in 1992), Airamero from 1990, Trio Midt-Norge, Piggy Bop from 1991, Vigleik Storaas Trio and the Trondheim Kunstorkester. He also started a long-lasting cooperation with Trygve Seim, among others in The Source, and has given profound marks on the Norwegian Jazz scene. He put his drums in for the band Tre Små Kinesere (1992) too.

When returning to Bærum (1992) he still continued many of these projects, in addition to performing with artists like Torbjørn Sunde, Jan Erik Kongshaug, the quartet TINGeLING, tubaist Lars Andreas Haug, Solveig Slettahjell's "Slow Motion Orchestra", Kjersti Stubø, Petter Wettre, Jacob Young, 1300 Oslo, Zanussi Five, with Kjetil Møster/Per Zanussi Trio, the singer Eldbjørg Raknes and the guitarist Hans Mathisen. In 1994 he toured with the trumpeter Kenny Wheeler and performed with the rock band Motorpsycho at Kongsberg Jazz Festival in 1995. He played with Joshua Redman, Arild Andersen and Bugge Wesseltoft at Moldejazz 2006.

Johansen together with Petter Wettre was rewarded Spellemannprisen 2000 in the class jazz for the album The Only Way to Travel, a prize he also received twice as a member of Vigleik Storaas Trio. He has released four records with Ingebrigt Håker Flaten and Christian Wallumrød in the trio Close Erase (from 1995). He has also given lectures in drumming at University of Oslo and Norges Musikkhøgskole.

== Honors ==
- Spellemannprisen 1995 in the class jazz, for the album Bilder withVigleik Storaas Trio
- Spellemannprisen 1997 in the class jazz, for the album Andre Bilder with Vigleik Storaas Trio
- Spellemannprisen 2000 in the class jazz, for the album The Only Way to Travel with Petter Wettre
- Spellemannprisen 2004 in the class jazz, for the album Silver with Solveig Slettahjell
- Spellemannprisen 2005 in the class jazz, for the album Quiet Songs with Hans Mathisen
- Spellemannprisen 2014 in the class contemporary music, for the album Outstairs with Christian Wallumrød Ensemble

== Discography (in selection) ==
=== Solo albums ===
- 2008: Ferme Solus – This is My Music (Euridice Turn Left)
- 2014: Solo at MIR – Blow Out! Oslo 3 December 2013 (Bandcamp)
- 2016: Let’s Dance (Edition Records)

=== Collaborative works ===
With Trond Bjertnes and Frode Barth

- 1994: Egentlig (Mind The Gap)

With The Source

- 1994: Olemanns kornett (Curling Legs)
- 1995: The Source: of Christmas (Curling Legs)
- 2002: The Source & Different Cikadas (ECM Records)
- 2005: The Source: of Christmas Live (Grappa Music)
- 2006: The Source (ECM Records)
- 2013: The Source: of Summer (Grappa Music)

With Jan Erik Kongshaug

- 1998: The Other World (ACT Music)
- 2003: All These Years (Ponca Jazz Records)

With Vigleik Storaas trio

- 1995: Bilder (Curling Legs), was awarded Spellemannprisen
- 1997: Andre Bilder (Curling Legs), was awarded Spellemannprisen
- 2002: Subsonic (Curling Legs)
- 2007: Now (Inner Ear)
- 2012: Epistel no 5 (Inner Ear)

Duo with Petter Wettre

- 2000: The only way to travel (BP/Tuba!), was awarded Spellemannprisen

With Close Erase

- 1995: Close Erase (NorCD)
- 1999: No.2 (NorCD)
- 2002: Dance This (BP)
- 2006: Sport Rocks (Jazzaway Records)
- 2010: R.I.P (Plastic Strip Press)

With 1300 Oslo

- 2001: Live in the North (Curling Legs)

With Kjersti Stubø

- 2001: My Shining Hour (Blue Jersey)

With Solveig Slettahjell

- 2001: Slow Motion Orchestra (Curling Legs)
- 2003: Silver (Curling Legs)
- 2005: Pixiedust (Curling Legs)
- 2006: Good Rain (ACT Music, Curling Legs)
- 2007: Domestic Songs (ACT Music, Curling Legs)
- 2009: Tarpan Seasons (Universal Music)

With Trygve Seim

- 2001: Different Rivers (ECM Records)
- 2004: Sangam (ECM Records)

With Eldbjørg Raknes

- 1997: TINGeLING (NorCD)
- 2002: So Much Depends on a Red Wheel Barrow (Platearbeiderne), commissioned work for Vossajazz
- 2004: Många röster talar (Bergland records)
- 2006: I live suddenly (MYrecordings)

With Christian Wallumrød Ensemble

- 2001: Sofienberg Variations (ECM Records)
- 2004: A Year From Easter (ECM Records)
- 2007: The Zoo Is Far (ECM Records)
- 2009: Fabula Suite Lugano (ECM Records)
- 2013: Outstairs (ECM Records)
- 2013: Kurzam and Fulger (Hubro Music)

With Håvard Wiik

- 2011: Postures (Jazzland Records)

With Daniel Rorke

- 2011: San'an (Saturn Musikk)

With Adam Baldych & Helge Lien Trio

- 2015: Bridges (ACT Music)
- 2017: Brothers (ACT Music)

With Mette Henriette

- 2015: Mette Henriette (ECM Records)

With Ayumi Tanaka Trio

- 2016: Memento (AMP Music & Records)

Awards
Preceded by Karin Krog & John Surman	Recipient of the Jazz Spellemannprisen; 2000	Succeeded by Urban Connection
