= Håvard Lund =

Norwegian jazz musician and composer (born 1970)

- Born: 20 October 1970 (age 55); Gildeskål Municipality, Nordland
- Origin: Norway
- Genres: Jazz
- Occupations: Musician, composer
- Instruments: Saxophone, clarinet
- Labels: Inner ear, Turn Left
- Website: www.haavardlund.no

Håvard Lund (born 20 October 1970), is a Norwegian jazz musician (clarinet and saxophone) and composer, known from a series of recordings and collaborations with musicians like Anja Garbarek, Vigleik Storaas, Steinar Raknes, Håkon Mjåset Johansen, Farmers Market, Frode Fjellheims Jazzjoik Ensemble, later to become Transjoik, Trygve Seim Ensemble and Trondheim Jazz Orchestra.

== Career ==
Lund earned his Examen artium on the Music Program at Mosjøen videregående skole in 1989 and graduated from the Jazz Program at Trondheim Musikkonservatorium in 1993. and was widely recognized as the saxophone player in Farmers Market (1991–1996), Frode Fjellheim's Jazzjoik Ensemble (1991–1998), and Trygve Seim Ensemble (1991–2021).

During 1996–2002 he composed music for a number of dramatic productions, including for Torshovteateret, Trøndelag Teater, NRK Radioteateret and Det Norske Teatret. From 2003 to 2008 he played for Forsvarets Musikkorps Nord-Norge as clarinetist, and was this year's festival artist Festspillene in Northern Norway in 2006. In addition he was Artist in residence at Musikk i Troms from 2007 to 2008, after which he held a permanent position there as a regional musician.

Lund has also worked as a session musician on numerous recordings, including with Decoy, Fotefar, Trygve Seim, Frode Fjellheim and Anja Garbarek.

In the 2010s, Lund developed The Arctic Hideaway, a residential workspace and part-year hotel on Sørvær in the Fleinvær group of islands in the Arctic Ocean, 40 minutes from Bodø.

== Discography ==
- 1996: Letters, with fellow students in Trondheim
- 2010: My Sister Said, jazz chamber music with Vigleik Storaas, Steinar Raknes and Håkon Mjåset Johansen.
- 2012: Blix by Lund, world music with among others Unni Løvlid, Sunanda Sharma, Jai Shankar, Svante Henrysson and the Musikk i Nordland ensemble MiNensemblet
- 2021: Dreams of boundless time, chamber music with Tor Johan Bøen and Nils Anders Mortensen
