= 1999 in Nordic music =

The following is a list of notable events and releases that happened in Nordic music in 1999.

== Events ==
- 12 January – Guitarist Fredrik Johansson leaves the Swedish band Dark Tranquillity, saying he wishes to spend more time with his family.
- 26 March – At the 26th Vossajazz in Norway, Helge Lilletvedt receives the festival prize.
- 2 May – Rued Langgaard's only opera, Antikrist, composed in the 1920s, is premiėred at the Tiroler Landestheater Innsbruck, nearly 50 years after Langgaard's death.
- 19 May – The 44th Eurovision Song Contest, held in Jerusalem, is won by Sweden's Charlotte Nilsson, with the song "Take Me to Your Heaven".
- 26 October – Sandstorm, an instrumental track by Finnish DJ Darude, is released as a single by 16 Inch Records. Its success in Finland leads to it subsequently being released worldwide and recognised as an outstanding dance single.
- unknown date – The Norwegian/Swedish jazz band Atomic is formed by leading musicians including Magnus Broo, Fredrik Ljungkvist, Ingebrigt Håker Flaten and Håvard Wiik.

== Classical works ==
- Magnus Lindberg
  - Cantigas
  - Cello Concerto No. 1
- Einojuhani Rautavaara – Symphony No. 8

== Film and television scores ==
- Georg Kajanus – Gendernauts
- Javed Kurd – Nytt på nytt
- Anssi Tikanmäki – Juha

== Top hit singles ==
- Aikakone – "Anna mun bailaa" (#1 Finland)
- Apulanta – "Hallaa" (#1 Finland)
- A-Teens – "Mamma Mia" (#1 Sweden, Denmark; #3 Norway)
- Björk – "All Is Full of Love" (#24 UK)
- Children of Bodom – "Downfall" (#1 Finland)
- Don Huonot – "Tule sellaisena kuin olet" (#1 Finland)
- Markoolio – "Vi drar till fjällen" (#1 Sweden, #4 Norway)
- Nightwish – "Sacrament of Wilderness" (#1 Finland)
- Charlotte Nilsson – "Take Me to Your Heaven" (#2 Sweden, #5 Norway)
- Martin – "(Du är så) Yeah Yeah Wow Wow" (#1 Sweden)
- Sonata Arctica – "UnOpened" (#16 Finland)

== Eurovision Song Contest ==
- Denmark in the Eurovision Song Contest 1999
- Iceland in the Eurovision Song Contest 1999
- Norway in the Eurovision Song Contest 1999
- Sweden in the Eurovision Song Contest 1999

== Births ==
- 16 February – Girl in Red (Marie Ulven Ringheim)
- 23 April – Laufey, Icelandic singer and songwriter
- 22 July – Alma Agger, Danish singer

== Deaths ==
- 16 February
  - Björn Afzelius, Swedish singer-songwriter and guitarist (born 1947; lung cancer)
  - Johan Kvandal, Norwegian composer (born 1919)
- 8 March – Hans Eklund, Swedish composer
- 14 March – Marius Müller, guitarist, singer, and songwriter, car crash (born 1958)
- 28 March – Jens Book Jenssen, popular singer, songwriter, revue artist, and theatre director (born 1910).
- 27 April – Gunnar Brunvoll, impresario and opera administrator (born 1924).
- 27 June – Einar Englund, Finnish composer (born 1916)
- 21 July – Arne Sletsjøe, Norwegian violist (born 1916).
- 8 September – Birgit Cullberg, Swedish choreographer (born 1908)
- 4 October – Erik "Grim" Brødreskift, Norwegian black metal drummer (born 1969; suicide)
- 4 December – Edward Vesala, Finnish avant-garde jazz composer, bandleader and drummer (born 1945; congestive heart failure)
