= Mette Henriette (album) =

Studio album by Mette Henriette
- Released: October 16, 2015
- Studio: Rainbow Studio (Oslo, Norway)
- Genre: Avant-garde jazz, chamber jazz
- Label: ECM Records

Mette Henriette chronology
Mette Henriette (2015)	Drifting (2023)

Mette Henriette is the debut double album by Norwegian saxophonist and composer Mette Henriette, released on ECM Records on October 16, 2015. It was the first debut double album to ever be released on the label.

== Critical reception ==
Professional ratings
Review scores
Source	Rating
All About Jazz	4/5 stars
AllMusic	4/5 stars
The Guardian	4/5 stars
Jazz.pt	5/5 stars
Jazz View	7.1/10

The Guardian critic John Fordham said that "Mette Henriette is a contemporary music star on the rise". The Independent critic Phil Johnson describes the album as "contemporary chamber music of power and persuasion, that joins its musicians in a quest for serenity". AllMusic critic Thom Jurek described the album as "an auspicious, provocative debut", and that "ECM's considerable faith in this young musician is well founded". All About Jazz critic Hryar Attarian described it as a "mosaic of shimmering tonal hues, provocative ideas and sublime moods". All About Jazz critic Karl Ackermann praised it for being "soulful and inspiring" and concluded that "Mette Henriette is original and unique and should generate much anticipation around Rølvåg's future projects."

=== Accolades ===
Publication	Accolade	Year
The Independent	Albums of the year 2015 / The best of 2015	2015
Jazz Magazine	Pick of the month November 2015	2015
Dagsavisen	Årets jazzalbum 2015	2015
Jazznyt	Et af årets bedste jazzalbums	2015
Burning Ambulance	Best Jazz 2015	2015

== Track listing ==
All tracks are written by Mette Henriette, except where noted.

CD 1 (o)
No.	Title	Writer(s)	Length
1.	"So"		1:41
2.	".oOo."	Johan Lindvall	3:47
3.	"The Taboo"		1:55
4.	"All Ears"		3:56
5.	"But Careful"		1:01
6.	"Beneath You"		3:10
7.	"Once"		3:53
8.	"We Were To"		0:54
9.	"3 - 4 - 5"	Lindvall	1:59
10.	"Hi Dive"		2:52
11.	"A Void"		4:27
12.	"The Lost One"		1:10
13.	"In Circles"		3:41
14.	"I Do"		3:48
15.	"O"	Lindvall	3:18

CD 2 (Ø)
No.	Title	Length
1.	"Passé"	5:00
2.	"Pearl Rafter"	1:04
3.	"Veils Ever After"	1:54
4.	"Unfold"	0:40
5.	"Wild Heart"	5:44
6.	"Strangers by Midday"	2:51
7.	"Late à la Carte"	4:10
8.	"So It Is"	1:38
9.	"?"	3:32
10.	"True"	0:47
11.	"This Will Pass Too"	0:58
12.	"But We Did"	3:48
13.	"I"	8:09
14.	"Breath"	3:59
15.	"Off the Beat"	1:51
16.	"Wind of Rocks"	6:34
17.	"Bare Blacker Rum"	1:50
18.	"& the Silver Fox"	1:41
19.	"Behold"	0:59
20.	"Better Unheard (Yet to Be Hold)"	1:12

== Personnel ==
Musicians

- Mette Henriette – tenor saxophone
- Johan Lindvall – piano
- Katrine Schiøtt – violincello
- Eivind Lønning – trumpet
- Andreas Rokseth – bandoneon
- Henrik Munkeby Nørstebø – trombone
- Per Zanussi – bass
- Per Oddvar Johansen – drums
- Sara Övinge – violin (Cikada String Quartet)
- Karin Hellqvist – violin (Cikada String Quartet)
- Odd Hannisdal – violin (Cikada String Quartet)
- Bendik Foss – viola (Cikada String Quartet)
- Ingvild Nesdal Sandnes – violincello (Cikada String Quartet)

Technical

- Jan Erik Kongshaug – studio engineer
