= Motif (band) =

Norwegian jazz band

- Origin: Trondheim, Norway
- Genres: Jazz; Experimental rock
- Years active: 1999–present
- Labels: Jazzland, AIM Music, Clean Feed
- Members: Atle Nymo; Eivind Lønning; Håvard Wiik; Ole Morten Vågan; Håkon Mjåset Johansen
- Past members: Davíð Þór Jónsson (David Thor Jonsson); Mathias Eick
- Website: motif.no

Motif (established 1999 in Trondheim, Norway) is an experimental jazz band, still polishing the personal sound they have been meticulously shaping since the beginning, with a Frank Zappa influence all around it (also present in the humouristic side of this proposal), a sound labeled as "a remarkable combination of powerful writing, simpatico free play, and stylistic cross-pollination" (John Kelman, Allaboutjazz). The musicians unite from bands such as Bugge Wesseltoft’s New Conceptions of Jazz, Atomic, Free Fall, Christian Wallumrød Ensemble, Motorpsycho, Generator X, Maria Kannegaard Trio and Trondheim Jazz Orchestra, and are known from appearances with jazz artists such as Joshua Redman, John Scofield, Lee Konitz, Chick Corea, Jan Garbarek, Joe Lovano and Kenny Wheeler, and are all key players at the young European improvising scene.

Motif has also appeared at a variety of festivals all over the world like the Copenhagen Jazz Festival, Bremen Jazz Ahead, Hanoi European Jazz Festival, Kongsberg Jazz Festival, Toronto Downtown Jazz Festival, Vancouver Jazz Festival, Moldejazz and clubs all over Europe. They have also toured in Asia, visiting China, Japan (where they've played the Pit Inn in Tokyo) and Vietnam.

== Band members ==
- Atle Nymo (saxophone)
- Eivind Lønning (trumpet)
- Håvard Wiik (piano)
- Ole Morten Vågan (bass)
- Håkon Mjåset Johansen (drums)

== Honors ==
- On the "Best of 2011" list with Facienda, in the "New Jazz Releases" category

== Discography ==
- 2005: Motif (AIM Records)
- 2005: Expansion (AIM Records)
- 2007: Hello..my name is (Vidzone)
- 2008: Apo Calypso (Jazzland Records)
- 2010: Facienda (Jazzland Records)
- 2011: Art Transplant (Clean Feed), with Axel Dörner
- 2016: My Head Is Listening (Clean Feed)
