= Raymond Strid =

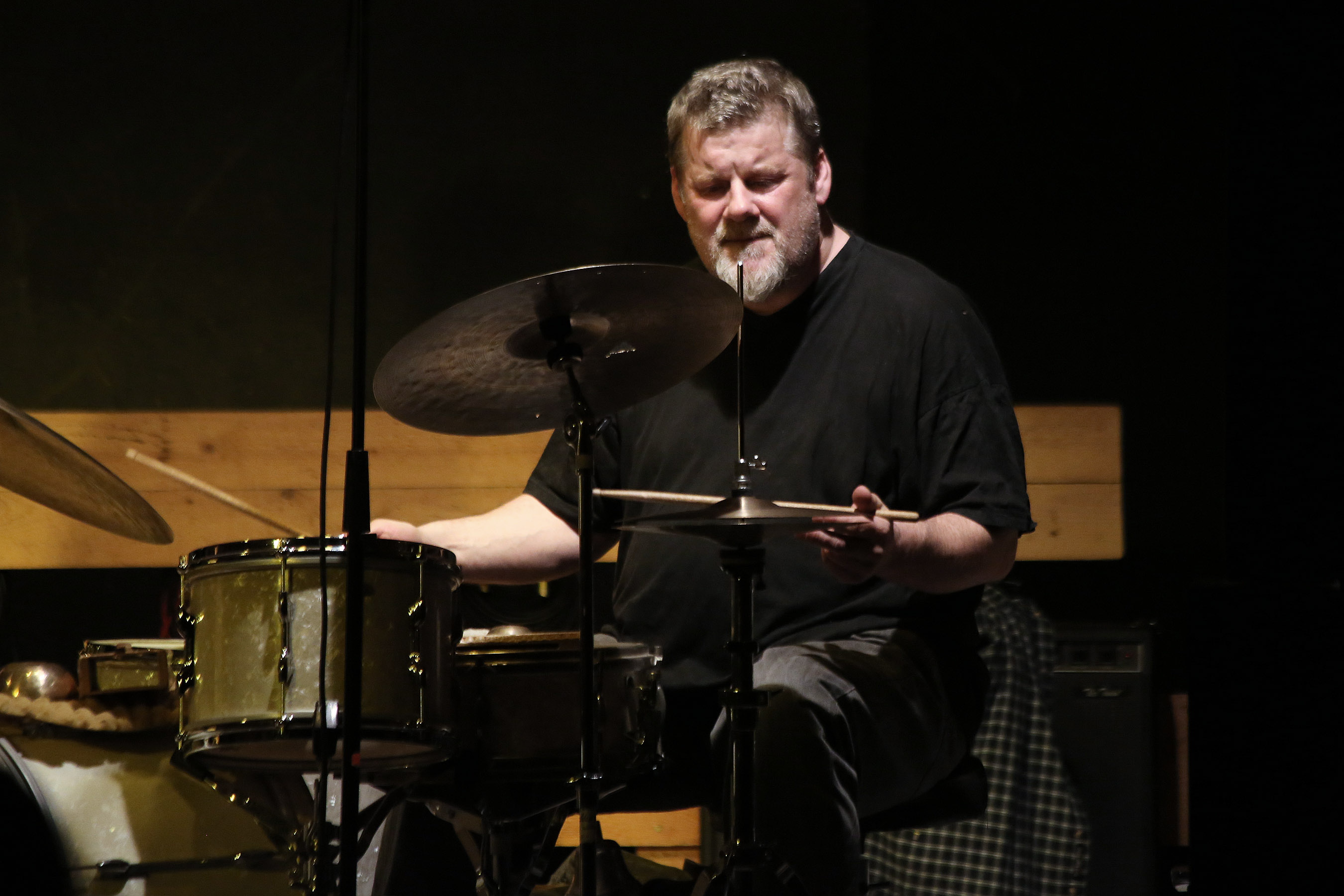
- Raymond Strid (2013).

Background information
- Born: 1956 (age 69–70); Stockholm
- Origin: Sweden
- Genres: Jazz, improvised music
- Occupations: Musician, composer
- Instrument: Drums
- Website: www.efi.group.shef.ac.uk/musician/mstrid.html

Raymond Strid (born 1956 in Stockholm, Sweden) is a Swedish drummer in the genre of free jazz and the new European improvised music.

== Biography ==
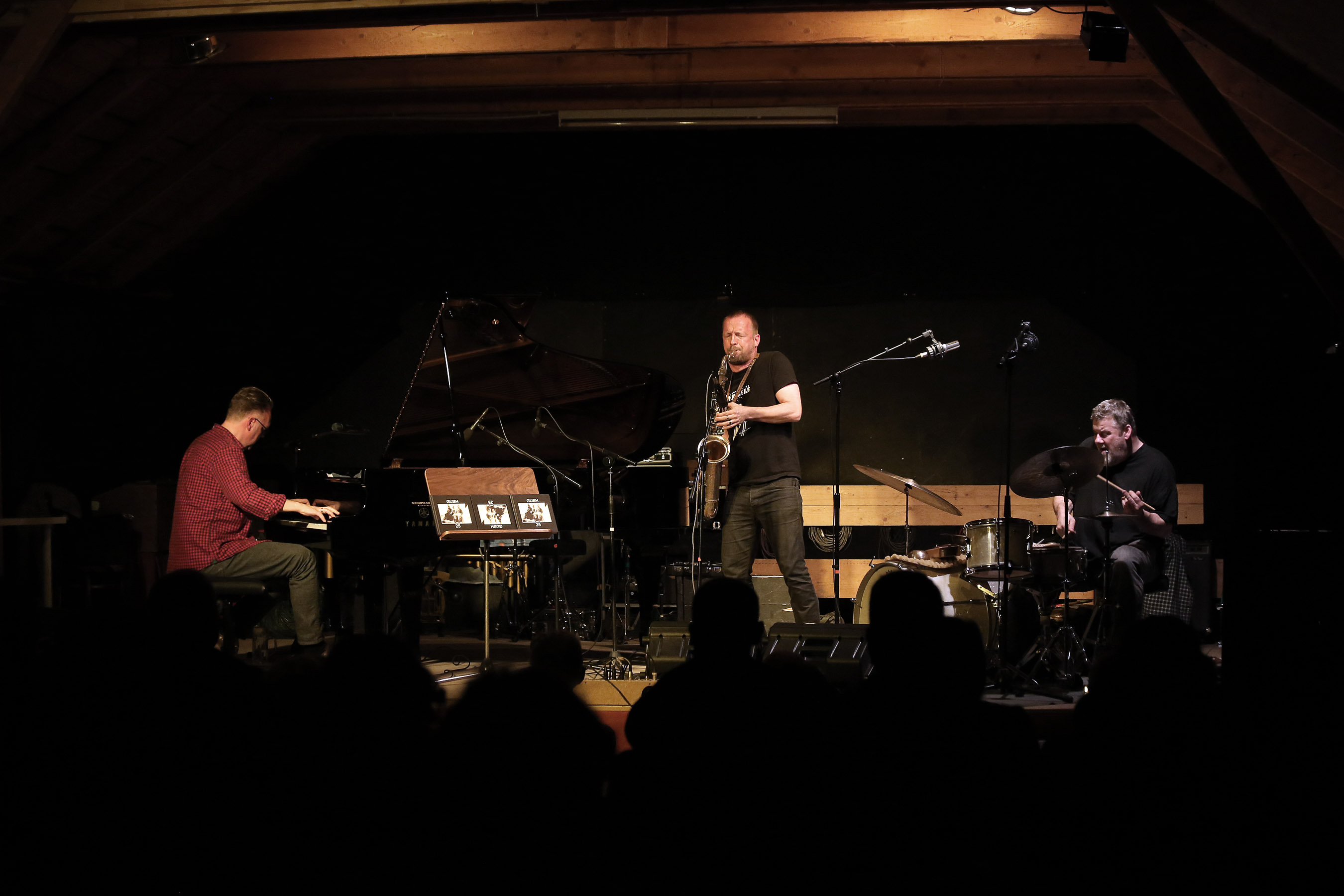
Strid with Mats Gustafsson and Sten Sandell (2013).

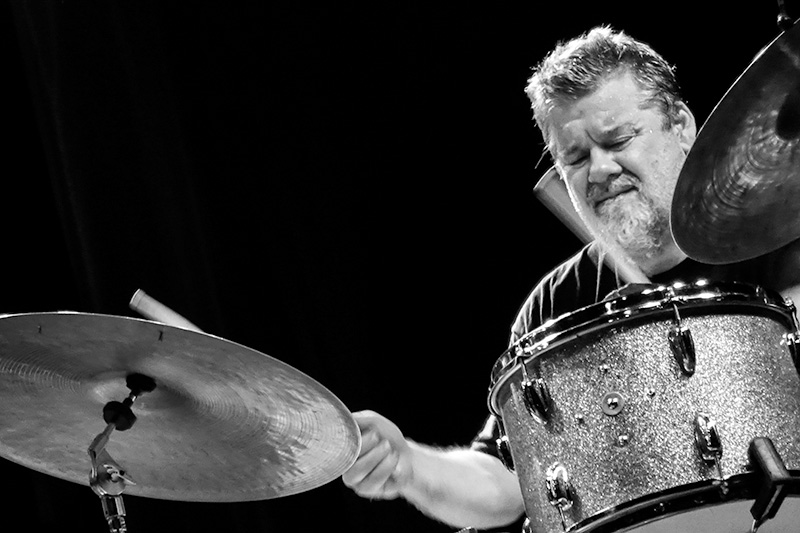
Raymond Strid in Aarhus, Denmark 2016

When Strid picked up drumming, he was inspired by musicians like Han Bennink, Paul Lytton, and Tony Oxley. He started his musical career relatively late. His debut concert was in September 1977, after first playing with a variety of local bands in Stockholm. In 1988 he founded the 'GUSH' trio together with saxophonist Mats Gustafsson and the pianist Sten Sandell. Since that time Strid has played in a series of bands and projects, such as in the trio Guy/Gustafsson/Strid, Marilyn Crispell/Anders Jormin/Raymond Strid and the Free Jazz trio LSB with Fredrik Ljungkvist and Johan Berthling. In 2000 he initiated 'The Electrics' with Axel Dörner, Sture Ericson and Ingebrigt Flaten. The same year Strid joined the Barry Guy New Orchestra. Strid played at numerous festivals of free improvisation in Europe and North America. He also teaches in musical improvisation.

== Discography ==
With 'The Too Much Too Soon Orchestra'

- 1988: Saw - Music For Instruments And Machines (Radium 226.05)
- 1996: What Is The Point Of Paris? (Fylkingen Records), with Dror Feiler

With the 'Gush' trio

- 1990: Tjo Och Tjim (Dragon Records)
- 1991: From Things To Sounds (Dragon Records)
- 1996: Gushwachs (Bead Records)
- 1997: Live At Fasching (Dragon Records)
- 1999: Live In Tampere (Dragon Records)
- 2005: Electric Eel (Qbico)
- 2005: Norrköping (Atavistic)
- 2015: The March (Konvoj Records)

With Paul Pignon

- 1992: Far From Equilibrium (Alice Musik Produktion)

With Marilyn Crispell

- 1994: Spring Tour (Alice Musik Produktion)

With Guy-Gustafsson-Strid Trio

- 1996: You Forget to Answer (Maya Recordings)
- 1997: Gryffgryffgryffs: The 1996 Radio Sweden Concert (Music And Arts Programs Of America, Inc.), with Marilyn Crispell
- 2008: Tarfala (Maya Recordings)

With Mats Gustafsson & 'Nu-Ensemblen'

- 1997: Hidros One (Caprice Records)

With 'LSB', trio including Fredrik Ljungkvist and Johan Berthling

- 2001: Walk, Stop, Look And Walk (Crazy Wisdom, Universal Music AB)
- 2003: Fungus (Moserobie Music Production)

With Barry Guy New Orchestra

- 2001: Inscape–Tableaux (Intakt Records)
- 2005: Oort–Entropy (Intakt Records)
- 2013: Mad Dogs (Not Two Records)
- 2014: Mad Dogs On The Loose (Not Two Records)
- 2014: Amphi • Radio Rondo (Intakt Records)

With Ken Vandermark, Sten Sandell, David Stackenas, and Kjell Nordeson

- 2002: Two Days In December (Wobbly Rail)

With 'Unsolicited Music Ensemble' including Martin Küchen and Tony Wren

- 2002: Bulbs (Slam Productions)

With 'The Electrics'

- 2002: Chain Of Accidents (Ayler Records)
- 2006: Live At Glenn Miller Café (Ayler Records)
- 2013: Fylkingen (ILK Music)

With 'UNSK' quartet including Birgit Ulher, Martin Küchen, and Lise-Lott Norelius

- 2004: Tidszon (Creative Sources)

With 'Martin Küchen Trio', including Per Zanussi

- 2007: Live At Glenn Miller Café (Ayler Records)

With Joëlle Léandre and François Houle

- 2007: 9 Moments (Red Toucan Records)
- 2010: Last Seen Headed: Live At Sons D'Hiver (Ayler Records)

With Per Anders Nilsson and Sten Sandell

- 2009: Beam Stone (Psi)

With 'Trespass Trio' including Martin Küchen and Per Zanussi

- 2009: ...Was There To Illuminate The Night Sky.. (Clean Feed)
- 2012: "Bruder Beda" (Clean Feed)
- 2013: Human Encore (Clean Feed), with Joe McPhee

With Pat Thomas and Clayton Thomas

- 2010: Wazifa (Psi)

With Kege Snö

- 2010: Keijsaren Gripen Efter Strid På Barnö (Umlaut Records), with Niklas Barnö, Joel Grip, and Roland Keijser

With Roland Keijser

- 2011: Yellow Bell (Umlaut Records)

With 'Tarfala Trio', including Barry Guy and Mats Gustafsson

- 2011: Syzygy (NoBusiness Records)

With Mats Gustafsson and John Russell

- 2012: Birds (dEN Records)

With Lonberg-Holm, Strid Duo

- 2012: Discus And Plumbing (Peira)

With 'Trespass Trio' & Joe McPhee

- 2013: Human Encore (Clean Feed), with Martin Küchen and Per Zanussi

With 'Pipeline'

- 2013: Pipeline (Corbett vs. Dempsey)

With 'Fire! Orchestra'

- 2013: Exit! (Rune Grammofon)
- 2014: Enter (Rune Grammofon)

With Andreas Backer

- 2015: Voice & Percussion (Creative Sources)

With Henrik Munkeby Nørstebø and Nina de Heney

- 2015: Oslo Wien (Va Fongool)
