= Oort–Entropy =

Studio album by Barry Guy
- Released: 2005
- Recorded: May and July, 2004
- Studio: SWR Studio, Baden-Baden, Germany
- Genre: Free jazz
- Label: Intakt Records; CD 101
- Producer: Intakt Records, Reinhard Kager

Oort–Entropy is an album by bassist Barry Guy. It was recorded in May and July, 2004, at SWR Studio in Baden-Baden, Germany, and was released in 2005 by Intakt Records. On the album, which features a three-part composition by Guy, he plays bass and conducts members of his New Orchestra: Evan Parker and Mats Gustafsson on saxophone, Hans Koch on bass clarinet, Herb Robertson on trumpet, Johannes Bauer on trombone, Per Åke Holmlander on tuba, Agustí Fernández on piano, and Paul Lytton and Raymond Strid on percussion. Oort–Entropy is the group's second recording, following 2001's Inscape–Tableaux.

== Reception ==
Professional ratings
Review scores
Source	Rating
The Penguin Guide to Jazz	4/4 stars
All About Jazz #1	4.5/5 stars
All About Jazz #2	4/5 stars

The authors of the Penguin Guide to Jazz Recordings awarded the album 4 stars, and stated that the "combination of written passages with improvisations has rarely been as well executed as in this piece... The music... has a strange and evanescent quality, working in shifting masses of sound that sometimes resolve into identifiable themes or lines but which more often remain distinct and separate."

Writing for All About Jazz, Glenn Astarita commented: "this release signifies an autonomous union of like-minded spirits where shape and form play a significant role in the artists' numerous improvisational exercises.... With mystical attributes, mind-blowing aural affects, and feverish soloing maneuvers, Oort-Entropy will most assuredly find itself on quite a few annual top ten lists as we close out 2005!" In a separate AAJ review, Derek Taylor wrote: "Guy constructs each section with dynamic schemes and structures in mind, regularly parsing the band into various subdivisions of duo, trio and larger to get the job done. Grand skyward sweeps fluctuate with detailed ground-scale gestures to create a whole that refuses to view the orchestra as a single monolithic body... they constitute an aural abstract that effectively encapsulates the cosmic connotations and of the phenomena named in the disc's title."

Writer Andrey Henkin praised the album's front line of horns, calling it "the most stimulating... in recent memory." He noted that, in comparison with the seven section structure of Inscape–Tableaux, Oort–Entropy "has three, allowing for more exposition within sections. And overall the time is almost 15 minutes less, making succinctness within expansion a necessary feature, masterfully accomplished."

One Final Note's Jay Collins called the album "thrilling," and remarked: "mixing Guy's captivating compositional style with big guns... is a rather potent recipe for success. And boy does it ever work."

== Track listing ==
Composed by Barry Guy.

1. "Part I" – 18:36
2. "Part II" – 18:22
3. "Part III" – 14:08

== Personnel ==
- Barry Guy – director, bass
- Evan Parker – soprano saxophone, tenor saxophone
- Mats Gustafsson – baritone saxophone, reeds
- Hans Koch – bass clarinet
- Herb Robertson – trumpet, flugelhorn
- Johannes Bauer – trombone
- Per Åke Holmlander – tuba
- Agustí Fernández – piano
- Paul Lytton – percussion
- Raymond Strid – percussion
