= Lønning =

Lønning is a Norwegian surname. As of 2013, there are 574 people in Norway with this surname. The word lønning is Norwegian for pay day.

== Notable people ==
Notable people with this surname include:

- Eivind Lønning (born 1983), Norwegian musician
- Inge Lønning (1938–2013), Norwegian theologian
- Per Lønning (1928–2016), Norwegian bishop
