= Drifting (album) =

Studio album by Mette Henriette
- Released: January 20, 2023
- Studio: Munch Museum (Oslo, Norway)
- Genre: Avant-garde jazz, chamber jazz
- Label: ECM Records

Mette Henriette chronology
Mette Henriette (2015)	Drifting (2023)

Drifting is the second studio album by Norwegian saxophonist and composer Mette Henriette, released on ECM Records on January 20, 2023.

== Critical reception ==
Professional ratings
Review scores
Source	Rating
All About Jazz	4/5 stars
AllMusic	4/5 stars
DownBeat	5/5 stars
Fono Forum	5/5 stars
The Guardian	"
Jazzwise	4/4 stars
Pitchfork	7.1/10
Télérama	3/4 stars

DownBeat critic Carlo Wolff describes the album as "contemporary chamber music of power and persuasion, that joins its musicians in a quest for serenity". AllMusic critic Thom Jurek referred to it as "sophisticated and spiritually resonant". Jazz Journal critic Simon Adams stated "It's often dangerous to over-praise a set, but in its quiet, understated way, I would call this album faultless. Modern jazz chamber music at its finest." Jazzwise critic John Fordham states "Drifting may remind you of a dream, or an embrace, or a preoccupied woodland wander a lot more than a wild bop-blasting night in a jazz club, but that's what the unique Mette Henriette is all about."

The Guardian critic John Lewis describes it as "Beautifully recorded low-volume acoustic music located somewhere equidistant from jazz, folk and contemporary composition." All About Jazz critic Karl Ackermann wrote "A sound that is both ethereal and spiritual. It is an excellent album, timeless, with a circular quality, and best listened to in its entirety." while All About Jazz critic Mike Jurkovic referred to it as "a quiet triumph". Pitchfork critic Jane Bua described Drifting as "hushed, repetitive meditations unbounded by the pressures of time" and continued "There is a certain comfort to be found in the passive energy of the album, which subtly unfolds according to its own timekeeping. It's clear that Henriette's pieces ask not for attention—merely patience and an open mind."

=== Accolades ===
Publication	Accolade	Year
The Guardian	Contemporary album of the month	2023
DownBeat	Best albums of the year 2023	2023
Dagsavisen	Årets jazzalbum 2023	2023

== Track listing ==
All tracks are written by Mette Henriette, except where noted.

No.	Title	Writer(s)	Length
1.	"The 7th"		0:42
2.	"Across the Floor"		1:57
3.	"I Villvind"		4:37
4.	"Čađat"		1:14
5.	"Chassé"		2:31
6.	"Drifting"		4:01
7.	"Oversoar"		6:17
8.	"Rue du Renard"	Henriette; Johan Lindvall	2:53
9.	"Indrifting You"		6:11
10.	"A Choo"		3:18
11.	"Čieđđa, fas"		1:55
12.	"0°"		1:53
13.	"Solsnu"		2:09
14.	"Crescent"		2:20
15.	"Divining"		1:11

All tracks were recorded in the Munch Museum in Oslo.

== Personnel ==
Musicians

- Mette Henriette – tenor Saxophone
- Johan Lindvall – piano
- Judith Hamann – violoncello

Technical

- Peer Espen Ursfjord – recording engineer
- Gérard de Haro – mixing engineer
