= Nina Rochelle =

Swedish rock band

- Origin: Sweden
- Genres: Rock
- Years active: 2002–present
- Labels: Mercury, Interscope, Island
- Members: Johan Lundgren; Per Wasberg; Martin Svensson; Pontus Frisk; Fredrik Lundberg
- Website: www.ninarochelle.com

Nina Rochelle is a Swedish rock band established in 2002 by Martin Svensson, Johan Lundgren and Per Wasberg. Occasionally Markus Mustonen of Swedish band Kent played in live concerts with the band. Pontus Frisk joined in 2005 and Fredrik Lundberg in 2007. The band has released three albums: Om Sverige vill ha det så (16 October 2003), Mörkertal (2005) and Måndagsfolket (26 April 2006). They have not released new material since 2009, and there are speculations that the band will be disbanding.

== Members ==
- Johan Lundgren – backing vocals, guitar (2003–)
- Per Wasberg – singer, bass (2003–)
- Martin Svensson – singer, guitar (2003–)
- Pontus Frisk – drums (2005–)
- Fredrik Lundberg – keyboard, singer (2007–)

== Discography ==
=== Albums ===
- 2003: Om Sverige vill ha det så
- 2005: Mörkertal
- 2006: Måndagsfolket

=== Singles ===
- 2003: "Taxi 43"
- 2003: "(Happy) Jag hatar att det är så"
- 2004: "Stockholm kommer förstöra mig"
- 2005: "Mörkertal"
- 2005: "Rött ljus"
- 2006: "Måndagsfolket"
