= Eivind Lønning =

Norwegian jazz trumpeter

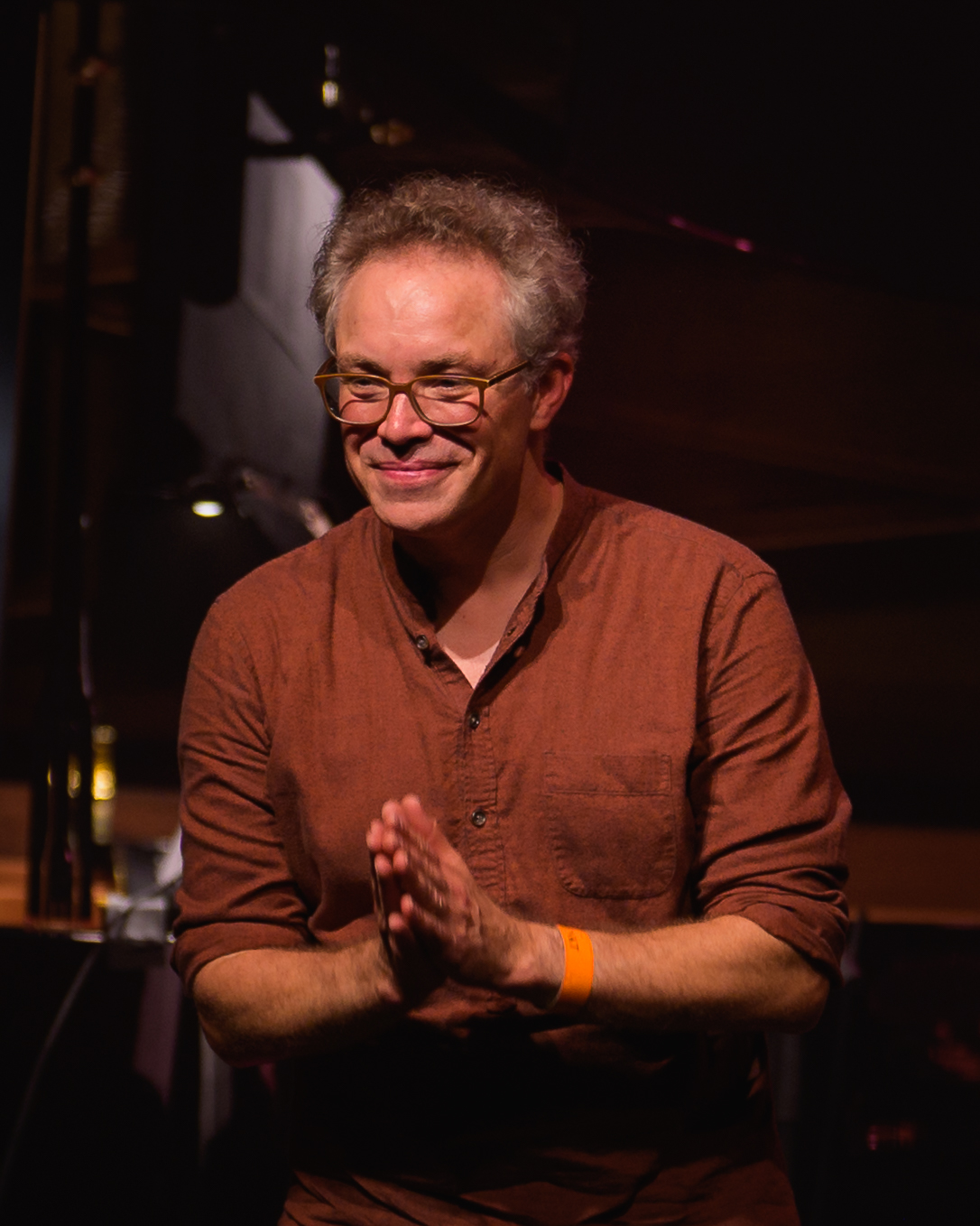
- Eivind Lønning at Punktfestivalen 2025

Background information
- Born: Eivind Nordset Lønning; 20 January 1983 (age 43); Kolbotn, Oppegård, Akershus
- Origin: Norway
- Genres: Jazz
- Occupations: Musician, composer
- Instrument: Trumpet
- Label: Sofa
- Website: www.eivindlonning.no

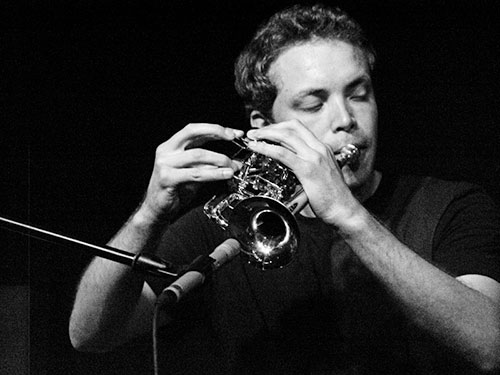
Eivind Lønning in 2015

Eivind Nordset Lønning (born 20 January 1983 in Kolbotn, Norway) is a Norwegian Jazz musician (trumpet) known from playing with Christian Wallumrød, Joshua Redman, Dave Holland and Chick Corea, and performed commissioned works by Eirik Hegdal, Per Zanussi, Ståle Storløkken, Motorpsycho and Erlend Skomsvoll.

== Career ==
Lønning grew up playing classical trumpet, started his education on the Music program at Ski vgs., and later completed a Bachelor on the Jazz program at Trondheim Musikkonservatorium (2004), a Master's degree at Norges Musikkhøgskole in Oslo.

Lønning participate in the duo «Streifenjunko» with Espen Reinertsen, in «Espen Reinertsen Organic Jukebox» (album 2007), in Christian Wallumrød Ensemble (plate 2010) and in quintet with Koboku Senjû (album 2010). He has also contributed to releases with Trondheim Jazz Orchestra Motorpsycho and he collaborated with Joshua Redman at Moldejazz (2006).

During the last few years «Streifenjunko» have played more than 100 concerts all over the world, including Japan, United States, South Africa, Australia and most of Europe. Festival performances includes Fri Resonans and Kongsberg Jazzfestival in Norway, On the Edge of Wrong Festival in South Africa, Moers Festival in Germany, Sonic Acts in Amsterdam, Cable Festival in Nantes, and the NOWnow Festival in Sydney. And in the summer of 2012 Lønning performed at the international Jazz festival Moldejazz in Norway.

== Discography ==
With «Streifenjunko»

- 2009: No Longer Burning – (Sofa)
- 2012: Sval Torv – (Sofa)

With Motif

- 2010: Facienda – (Jazzland Records), triple album
- 2011: Art Transplant – (Clean Feed)
- 2016: My Head Is Listening (Clean Feed)

With other projects

- 2008: Varianter Av Døde Traer – (Sofa), with Tetuzi Akiyama, Martin Taxt & Espen Reinertsen
- 2008: Fabula Suite Lugano – (ECM Records), with Christian Wallumrød Ensemble
- 2010: Selektiv Hogst – (Sofa), with Koboku Senjû, Tetuzi Akiyama, Toshimaru Nakamura, Espen Reinertsen and Martin Taxt
- 2015: Mette Henriette (ECM Records), with Mette Henriette
