= Collaborations (Marilyn Crispell album) =

Live album by Marilyn Crispell
- Released: 2009
- Recorded: October 23, 2004, and March 9, 2007
- Venue: Culturen, Vasteras, Sweden
- Genre: Free jazz
- Label: Leo Records; LR 528
- Producer: Lennart Nilsson, Leo Feigin

Collaborations is a live album by pianist Marilyn Crispell. The first two tracks were recorded on October 23, 2004, at the "Perspectives 2004" event at the Culturen in Vasteras, Sweden, and feature Crispell in a quartet with Fredrik Ljungkvist on clarinet and saxophone, Palle Danielsson on bass, and Paal Nilssen-Love on drums. The remaining three tracks were recorded on March 9, 2007 at the "Perspectives 2007" event at the same location, and feature the pianist in a quintet with Magnus Broo on trumpet, Lars-Goran Ulander on saxophone, Per Zanussi on bass, and Paal Nilssen-Love on drums. The album was released in 2009 by Leo Records.

== Reception ==
Professional ratings
Review scores
Source	Rating
AllMusic	4/5 stars
All About Jazz	4/5 stars

In a review for AllMusic, arwulf arwulf wrote: "Collaborations, a richly rewarding compilation of material from quartet and quintet dates... illuminates [Crispell's] creative involvement with some of Scandinavia's most promising young improvisers... the quartet is perhaps a bit edgier, as the unit is strongly fortified by the presence of reedman Fredrik Ljungkvist and drummer Paal Nilssen-Love. These men are members of the feisty Norwegian/Swedish group Atomic... Trumpeter Magnus Broo, who harmonizes well with Lars-Golan-Ulander in the quintet, is also affiliated with the Atomic band. This exciting, adventuresome music is highly recommended for anyone who loves the sounds of collective improvisation and wishes to stay in touch with the marvelous artistry of Marilyn Crispell."

== Track listing ==
1. "Quartet Collaboration" (Ljungkvist, Crispell, Nilssen-Love, Danielsson) – 15:10
2. "Aros" (Danielsson) – 22:40
3. "Quintet Collaboration 1" (Ulander, Broo, Crispell, Nilssen-Love, Zanussi) – 11:52
4. "Quintet Collaboration 2" (Ulander, Broo, Crispell, Nilssen-Love, Zanussi) – 14:05
5. "Silence Again" (Crispell) – 10:15

== Personnel ==
- Marilyn Crispell – piano
- Fredrik Ljungkvist – clarinet, tenor saxophone (tracks 1 and 2)
- Lars-Goran Ulander – alto saxophone (tracks 3 – 5)
- Magnus Broo – trumpet (tracks 3 – 5)
- Palle Danielsson – bass (tracks 1 and 2)
- Per Zanussi – bass (tracks 3 – 5)
- Paal Nilssen-Love – drums
