= Gryffgryffgryffs =

Live album by Barry Guy, Mats Gustafsson, and Raymond Strid with Marilyn Crispell
- Released: 1997
- Recorded: January 22, 1996
- Venue: Radio House, Studio 2, Stockholm
- Genre: Free jazz
- Length: 56:09
- Label: Music & Arts; CD-1003
- Producer: Lars-Göran Ulander

Guy/Gustafsson/Strid Trio chronology
You Forget to Answer (1996)	Gryffgryffgryffs (1997)	Tarfala (2008)

Gryffgryffgryffs: The 1996 Radio Sweden Concert is a live album by the Guy/Gustafsson/Strid Trio, featuring bassist Barry Guy, saxophonist Mats Gustafsson, and percussionist Raymond Strid, with guest artist Marilyn Crispell on piano. It was recorded on January 22, 1996, at the Radio House, Studio 2, in Stockholm, and was released by the Music & Arts label in 1997. In 2017, the album was reissued in digital form by Catalytic Sound.

The album title is a word that appears in James Joyce's Finnegans Wake, and that, according to author Gaurav Majumdar, suggests "stammering." The remaining track titles were inspired by Joyce ("Ififif"), Tony O'Mally ("Inscape"), Ted Hughes ("Org," "Ghast," and "Orghast") and Tekla Melin ("What Else?").

== Reception ==
Professional ratings
Review scores
Source	Rating
AllMusic	4/5 stars
The Penguin Guide to Jazz	3.5/4 stars
The Virgin Encyclopedia of Jazz	3/5 stars

The editors of AllMusic awarded the album 4 stars.

The authors of The Penguin Guide to Jazz wrote: "The key sequence consists of three tracks, "Org," "Ghast," "Orghast," which seem to explore a carefully delimited range of ideas, except that Crispell is never content to remain within narrow harmonic or rhythmic bounds. It works, despite her overblown expressionism."

== Track listing ==
1. "Gryffgryffgryffs" – 7:25
2. "Ififif" – 13:18
3. "Inscape" – 7:25
4. "Org" – 5:59
5. "Ghast" – 14:48
6. "Orghast" – 6:47
7. "What Else?" – 8:28

== Personnel ==
- Mats Gustafsson – baritone saxophone, soprano saxophone, tenor saxophone
- Marilyn Crispell – piano
- Barry Guy – bass
- Raymond Strid – drums
