= Petter Wettre =

Norwegian jazz saxophonist and composer

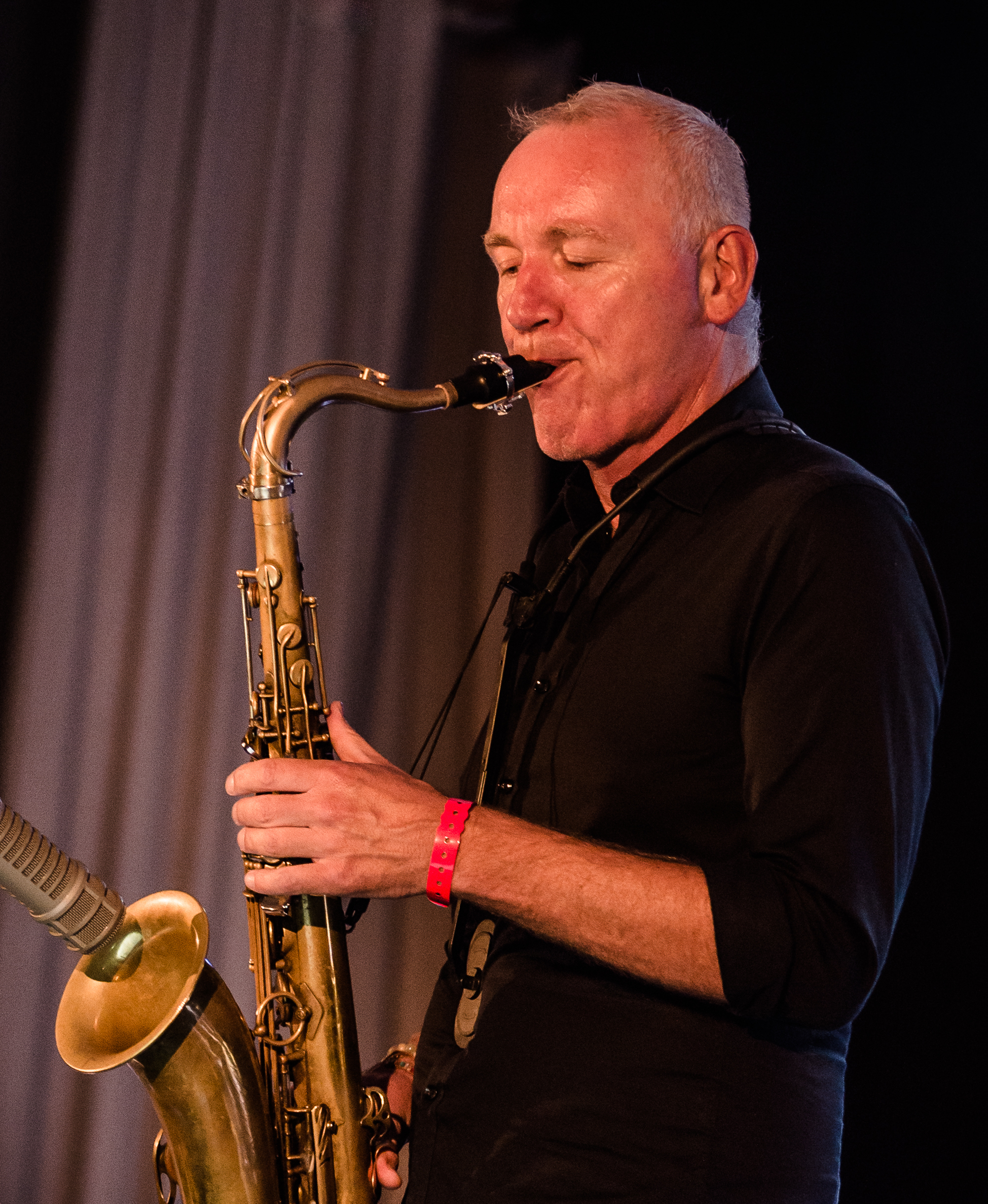
- Performing in Arendal, Norway 2017.

Background information
- Born: 11 August 1967 (age 58); Sandefjord, Vestfold, Norway
- Genres: Jazz
- Occupation: Musician
- Instrument: Saxophone
- Label: Household
- Website: petterwettreofficial.fr

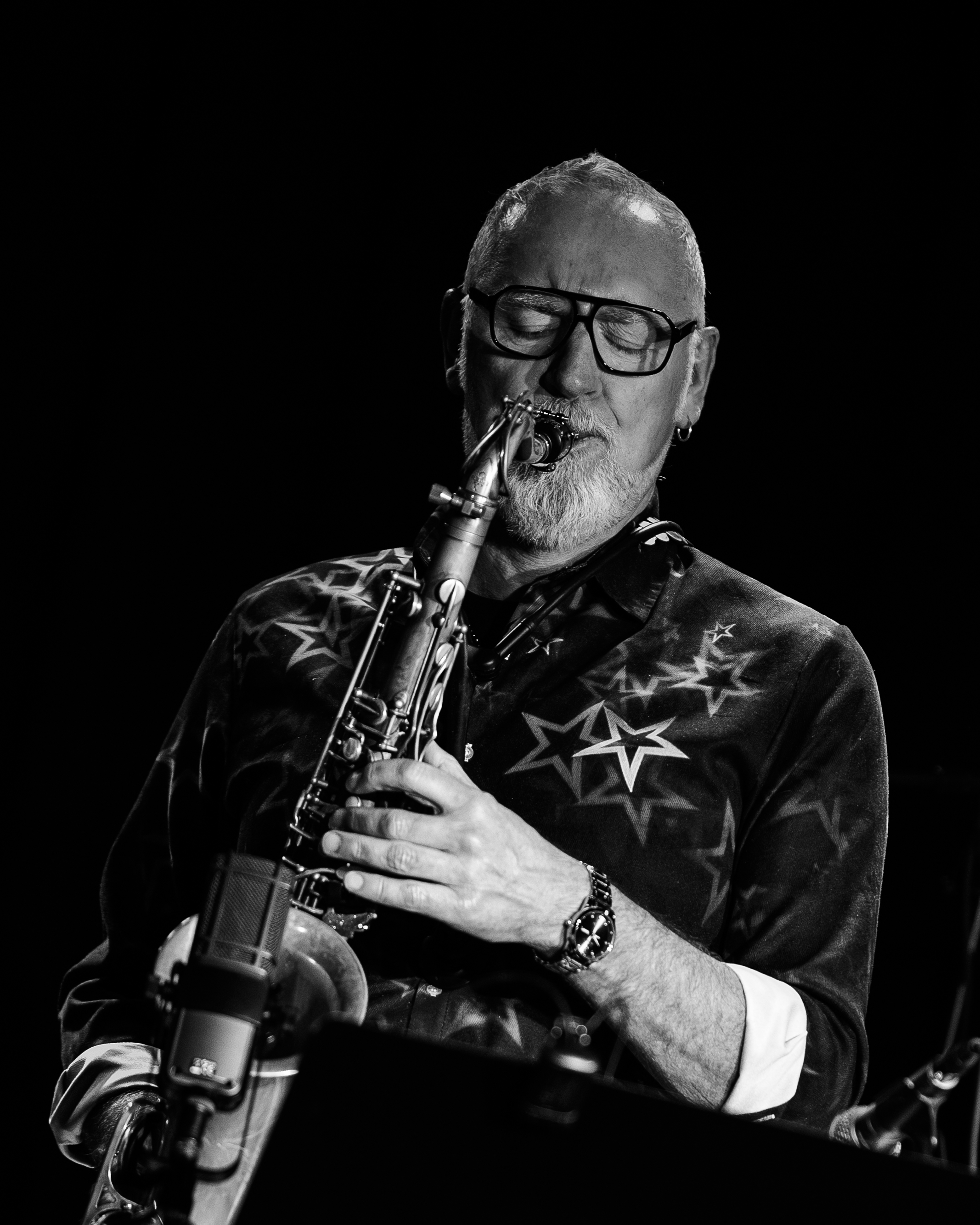
Petter Wettre in Arendal, Norway 2026

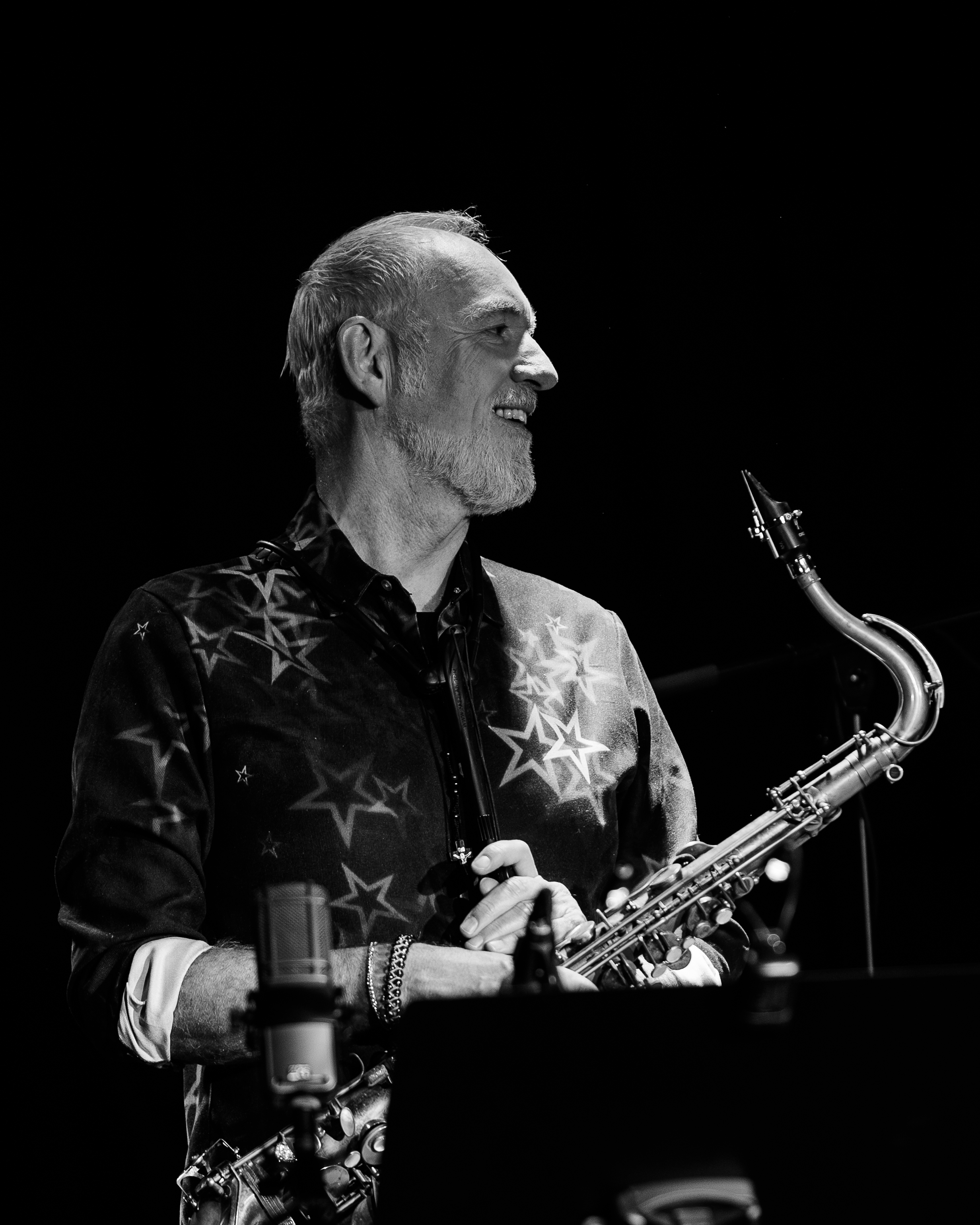
Wettre, 2026

Petter Wettre (born 11 August 1967) is a Norwegian jazz musician (saxophone) and composer, known from a number of album recordings, accompanied by receiving the Spellemannprisen two times.

== Career ==
Wettre was born and raised in Sandefjord. He studied music at the Toneheim Folk High School (1987), and later at the Berklee College of Music in Boston (1992), where he studied under the guidance of international Jazz Profiles like Dave Liebman and George Garzone. Moving back to Norway, he immediately formed his own Quartet with engagement at the Kongsberg Jazzfestival in 1993, followed by a Norway Tour in 1994. Eventually, he settled in Oslo and he distinguished himself at the Oslo Jazz Scenes with his own Trio and Quartet, and sat in with the "Storeslem" (Big Band) and "Sandefjord Big Band", toured with his own trio in Tribute to Ornette Coleman (1994), sat in with the band Time Out (1994–95), on tour with Øystein Sevåg's Global House (1995–96), Shirley Bassey (1995–96), played within the bands "Graffiti", "Horns for hire", Oslo Groove Company and Norske Store Orkester. Breakthrough as a jazz musician came with the representation of Norway at the EBU concert in Prague in 1995. He also appears on recordings with, among Others Torbjørn Sunde's Meridians (1998), Frode Alnæs's Frode (1996), the Element – Shaman (1999) and Oslo Groove Company – Anno (1996).

On the debut album Pig Virus (1996) with his Petter Wettre Quartet he was joined by Håvard Wiik (piano), Terje Gewelt (bass) and Per Oddvar Johansen (drums). Through "The Trio" (1995–2001) he has held a variety of co-operation with Jarle Vespestad (trommer), Per Oddvar Johansen (drums), Jon Christensen (drums) and Ingebrigt Håker Flaten (bass), Arild Andersen (bass) and Per Zanussi (bass). Lately he has had an extensive musical collaboration with the Danish Jazz musicians Jonas Westergaard (bass) and Anders Mogensen (drums) respectively in trio and quartet format. Today's edition of Petter Wettre Quartet comprises Westergaard and Mogensen, respectively, bass and drums, as well as Erlend Slettevoll (piano). By some Events, Slettevoll is replaced by guitarist Kim Johannesen. Jonas Westergaard had a stay in New York where he sat in with Jazz sizes like George Garzone, Oliver Lake and Kresten Osgood.

Wettre runs the record label "Household Records" (from 2002), has given lectures Oslo musikkonservatorium and Agder Musikkonservatorium, and released Elvin Jones transcripts in the book Live at the lighthouse (2005). He was a nominee for the 2011 Spellemannprisen, this was his sixth nomination for this Award, an award he received for the album The only way to travel (2000) and for the album Fountain of Youth (2007). This time it was not for an album, but the duets with drummer Audun Kleive, only available as audio and video files, not released on any album.

Although most renown for the projects Petter Wettre Quartet and Petter Wettre Trio, he has also worked with international Jazz stars, such as Dave Liebman, Joey DeFrancesco, Kenny Wheeler, Adam Nussbaum and Manu Katche. Wettre was the first choice when the French drummer Manu Katché sought a saxophone substitute for Jan Garbarek in the international Manu Katché Quintet.

This autumn Wettre will choose from the top shelf, when introducing himself to the Oslo Jazz audience, with a series of live concerts at the "Viktoria Nasjonale Jazzscene". First sprinkle star comes in the form of a duo with Jason Rebello, which Wettre tuned in with while sitting in with the Manu Katche Quartett. Labello is a permanent member of this quartet and known for collaboration with Star musicians like Sting, Peter Gabriel and Jan Garbarek. Wettre and Labello were united in musical unfolding again on stage on 18 October 2012 in Oslo.

== Honors ==
- 2000: Spellemannprisen in the class Jazz
- 2000: Kongsberg Jazz Award
- 2007: Spellemannprisen in the class Jazz

== Discography ==
=== Solo albums ===
- 1996: Pig virus (Curling Legs), quartet including Håvard Wiik, Terje Gewelt and Per Oddvar Johansen
- 1998: Meet the Locals (Resonant), trio including Ingebrigt Håker Flaten and Jarle Vespestad
- 2000: In Color (Resonant), with David Liebman, including with Ingebrigt Håker Flaten and Jarle Vespestad
- 2000: The Only Way to Travel (Bergland), with Per Oddvar Johansen, awarded Spellemannprisen 2000 in the class Jazz
- 2001: The Mystery Unfolds (Bergland), trio including Ingebrigt Håker Flaten and Jarle Vespestad
- 2002: Household Name (Household), quartet including Wiik, Zanussi, Mogensen and Palle Pesonen
- 2003: Live at Copenhagen Jazzhouse (Household), trio including Anders Christensen and Anders Mogensen
- 2004: Tour De Force (Household), with David Liebman, including with Ingebrigt Håker Flaten and Jarle Vespestad
- 2004: Hallmark Moments (Household)
- 2006: State of the Art (Household), with Kvintetten
- 2006: Paramount (Household), solo
- 2007: Fountain of Youth (Household) – was Awarded Spellemannprisen in the class Jazz
- 2008: Appetite for Structure (Household)
- 2008: Fountain of Youth Live! (Household), with The Norwegian Radio Orchestra
- 2011: The Only Way To Travel 2 (Household Records)
- 2012: The Social Media Tapes (Household Records)
- 2014: Playing Up to My Standards (Household), with Bjørn Vidar Solli, Erlend Slettevoll, Frode Berg and Adam Pache

=== Collaborations ===
- 1999: Shaman (Bergland), within 'Element', including with Gisle W. Johansen, Vidar Johansen, Håvard Wiik, Ingebrigt Håker Flaten and Paal Nilssen-Love
- 2004: Dig It! (Nagel Heyer), with Frode Berg, featuring Petter Wettre, Roy Powell and Andreas Bye
- 2005: Denada (ACT), with Helge Sunde & Norske Store Orkester, featuring Olga Konkova and Marilyn Mazur
- 2010: The Red Album (Siddhartha Spiritual Music), with Øystein Sevåg Global House Band

Awards
Preceded by Karin Krog and John Surman	Recipient of the Jazz Spellemannprisen; 2000	Succeeded by Urban Connection
Preceded by Audun Kleive	Recipient of the Kongsberg Jazz Award; 2000	Succeeded by Christian Wallumrød
Preceded by Atomic	Recipient of the Jazz Spellemannprisen; 2007	Succeeded by Helge Lien Trio
