= You Forget to Answer =

Live album by Barry Guy, Mats Gustafsson, and Raymond Strid
- Released: 1996
- Recorded: November 16, 1994, and July 24, 1995
- Venue: BBC London and Jazz Gallery Nickelsdorf, Austria
- Genre: Free jazz
- Label: Maya Recordings; MCD 9601
- Producer: Barry Guy, Derek Drescher, Mats Gustafsson, Maya Homburger, Raymond Strid

Guy/Gustafsson/Strid Trio chronology
You Forget to Answer (1996)	Gryffgryffgryffs (1997)

You Forget to Answer is a live album by bassist Barry Guy, saxophonist Mats Gustafsson, and percussionist Raymond Strid. Five of the album's tracks were recorded on November 16, 1994, at BBC London, while the remaining tracks were recorded on July 24, 1995, at Jazz Gallery Nickelsdorf, Austria. The album was released in 1996 by Maya Recordings. In addition to appearing on soprano, tenor, and baritone saxophones, Gustafsson is also heard on a fluteophone, a flute with a saxophone mouthpiece attached to one end, and a clarinet stand stuck into the other.

== Reception ==
Professional ratings
Review scores
Source	Rating
AllMusic	4/5 stars
The Penguin Guide to Jazz	4/4 stars

In a review for AllMusic, Brian Olewnick wrote: "Guy is consistently inventive, prodding, and exploratory, and finds an excellent partner in Strid, whose cadences often have the natural rhythm of an upended cupboardful of kitchenware... On cuts like the closing 'The Importance of Oxidation,' the sounds flower into a spellbinding and thrilling whole and cause one to hunger for more. Recommended."

The authors of the Penguin Guide to Jazz Recordings awarded the album 4 stars, noting that although "Gustafsson is the obvious star," "Guy is the fulcrum and the driving force of this group, creating a complex fabric of sound and pushing the two younger men out into areas that don't so much suggest total abstraction as a kind of mathematical abstractness... that is... deeply exciting."

Peter Margasak, writing for the Chicago Reader, stated that the album "displays the sort of clairvoyance that distinguishes the most exciting improv, but it works according to an innate architectural sense that reflects the interest of all three musicians in composed music."

== Track listing ==
Composed by Barry Guy, Mats Gustafsson, and Raymond Strid.

1. "Air is a Significant Factor" – 5:46
2. "Schrödingers Cat" – 6:00
3. "You Forgot to Answer" – 5:26
4. "Discorsi" – 6:41
5. "Zonks" – 6:21
6. "EPR" – 10:18
7. "Eye-Luh" – 9:05
8. "The Importance of Oxidation" – 4:04

== Personnel ==
- Barry Guy – bass
- Mats Gustafsson – soprano saxophone, tenor saxophone, baritone saxophone, fluteophone
- Raymond Strid – percussion
