= Spring Tour =

Live album by Marilyn Crispell, Anders Jormin, and Raymond Strid
- Released: 1995
- Recorded: March 15 and 20, 1994
- Venue: Club Village, Västerås, Sweden and Club Fasching, Stockholm, Sweden
- Genre: Free Jazz
- Label: Alice Musik Produktion; ALCD 013
- Producer: Johan Petri, Niklas Billström

Spring Tour is a live album by pianist Marilyn Crispell, bassist Anders Jormin, and drummer Raymond Strid. It was recorded at Club Village in Västerås, Sweden and Club Fasching in Stockholm, Sweden in March 1994, and was released in 1995 by Alice Musik Produktion.

In an interview, Crispell recalled hearing Jormin for the first time, and the impact it had on her:

"In November 1992, I was at a festival in Stockholm where I heard a Swedish bass player—his name is Anders Jormin—and something just clicked. I said, 'This is someone I can go in both directions with. You know, I can go up to Sweden and safely explore this lyrical side of myself, away from where people know me and will make judgments'... I was nervous about it because I had such a reputation for being a Cecil Taylor clone in a sense, you know. So I wanted a safe space to do my thing, away from the prying eyes of whoever. It was very scary at first because, for one thing, I was kind of learning it—it was so new—and I wasn't that good at it at first. And also, I admit, because I was worried about what people would think. I'm trying to be less worried about what people will think in spite of my desire to express myself unapologetically at all times. But it was somewhere I wanted to go."

== Reception ==
Professional ratings
Review scores
Source	Rating
The Penguin Guide to Jazz	4/4 stars
Tom Hull – on the Web	B+

The authors of the Penguin Guide to Jazz Recordings awarded the album 4 stars, and stated: "Well, the season seems completely apposite for music as fresh and affirmative as this... Where often Crispell can sound slightly dense and introspective, here she dares to play somewhat more simply and directly. She is undoubtedly encouraged by her two colleagues. Strid has a brisk, beery exuberance... which doesn't invite tortured, existential dramatics, while the bassist is quite simply one of the most beautiful stylists currently working on the instrument. Heady, uplifting stuff."

Critic Tom Hull commented: "all three contribute songs, with Jormin's genteel avant-ambiance already pointing him toward ECM; the pianist obliges by foregoing her pyrotechnics in favor of lighter, subtler abstractions."

== Track listing ==
1. "Spring Flood" (Strid) – 11:25
2. "Tune For Charlie" (Crispell) – 9:17
3. "Querit" (Jormin) – 6:24
4. "Not Wanting" (Crispell) – 6:09
5. "Horto" (Jormin) – 4:30
6. "Night Light Beach" (Crispell) – 6:58
7. "Circum Spectrat" (Jormin) – 6:36
8. "Cogito" (Jormin) – 7:00
9. "J. C. Offside" (Strid) – 10:10
10. "Lazy Bird" (John Coltrane) – 5:22
- Tracks 1, 2, 3, 5, 6, and 8 recorded at Club Village in Västerås, Sweden, on March 15, 1994. Tracks 4, 7, 9, and 10 recorded at Club Fasching in Stockholm, Sweden March 20, 1994.

== Personnel ==
- Marilyn Crispell – piano
- Anders Jormin – bass
- Raymond Strid – drums
