= Henrik Munkeby Nørstebø =

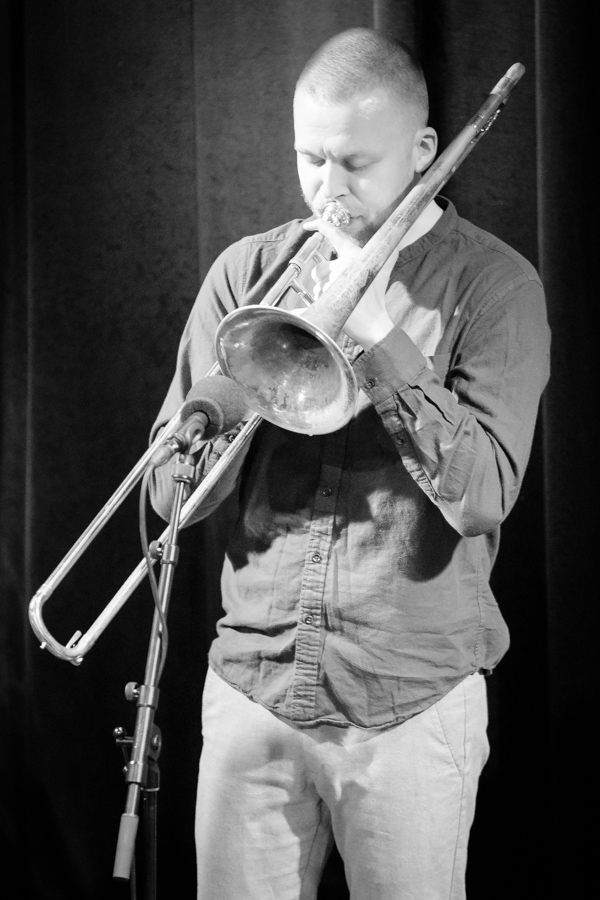
- Torstein Lavik Larsen with Skadedyr at Victoria Teater. The concert took place on 27. April 2018 in Oslo.

Background information
- Born: 29 July 1986 (age 40); Trondheim
- Origin: Norway
- Genre: Sound
- Occupations: Musician, composer
- Instrument: Trombone
- Website: henriknorstebo.com

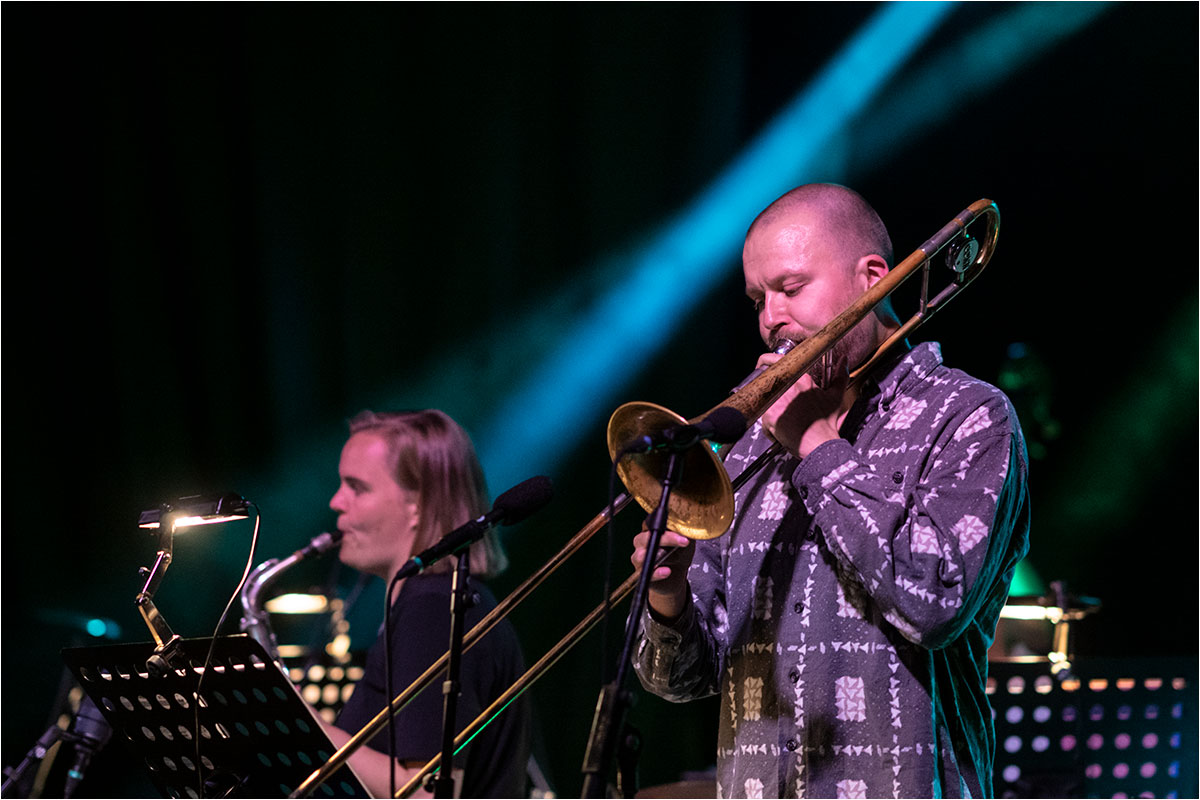
Henrik Munkeby Nørstebø and Amalie Dahl at the Aarhus Jazz Festival (2022)

Henrik Munkeby Nørstebø (born 29 July 1986 in Trondheim, Norway) is a Norwegian trombonist.

== Discography ==
=== Solo albums ===
- 2011: SOLO (Creative Sources)
- 2015: Melting Into Foreground (SOFA)
- 2022: Dystopian dancing (Made Now Music/Dugnad Rec)
- 2026: Faint light blackens (Psychic Liberation)

BEAM SPLITTER (with Audrey Chen)

- 2017: Rough Tongue (Corvo Records)
- 2020: Dedicated play (Self released) * with 17 guest artists
- 2023: Split Jaw (Tripticks tapes)
- 2023: Beauties (Neither/Nor Records) * with Eivind Lønning & Espen Reinertsen
- 2024: Wrists out (Robalo Music) *with Phil Minton
- 2026: Dedicated play : Live at Morphine Raum (Tripticks tapes) * with 14 guest artists

=== Collaborations ===
With 'As Deafness Increases'

- 2013: As Deafness Increases (Va Fongool)

With 'Lana Trio' including Andreas Wildhagen and Kjetil Jerve

- 2013: Lana trio (Va Fongool)
- 2014: Live In Japan (Va Fongool)

With 'Skadedyr'

- 2013: Kongekrabbe (Hubro)
- 2016: Culturen (Hubro)

With Rasmus Borg

- 2014: 120112 (Edition Wandelweiser Records)

With Daniel Lercher

- 2014: TH_X (Chmafu Nocords)

With Mette Henriette's 'Ø'

- 2015: Mette Henriette (ECM Records)

With 'Torg'

- 2015: Kost/Elak/Gnäll (Jazzland Recordings)

With the trio 'Whirl' including Adrian Myhr and Tobias Delius

- 2015: Revolving Rapidly Around An Axis (dEN Records)

With Raymond Strid and Nina de Heney

- 2015: Oslo Wien (Va Fongool)
