= Håkon Kornstad =

Norwegian jazz musician

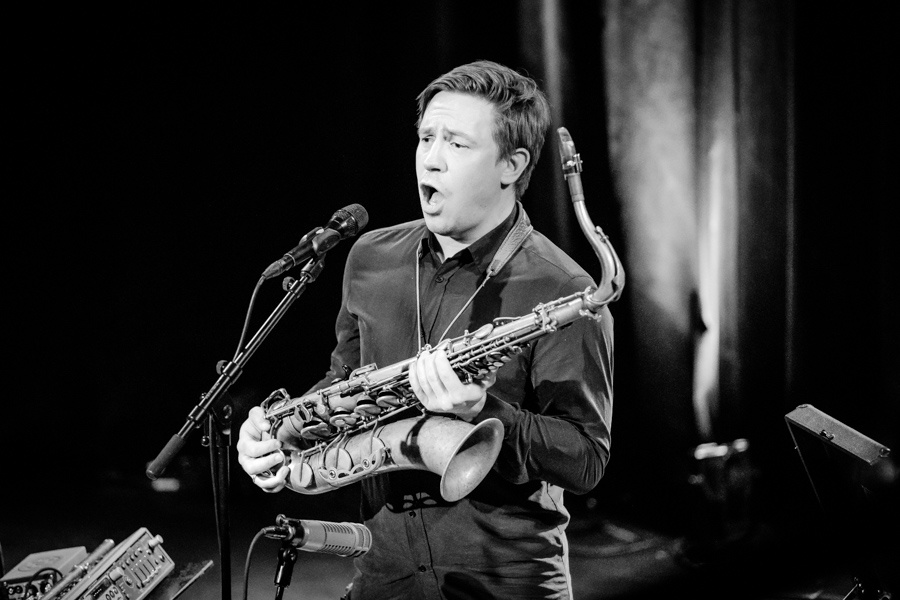
- Håkon Kornstad at stage in 2018

Background information
- Born: Håkon Ganes Kornstad; 5 April 1977 (age 49); Oslo, Norway
- Origin: Norwegian
- Genres: Jazz, opera
- Occupations: Musician and composer
- Instruments: Vocals tenor, tenor saxophone, bass saxophone, flute, live looping
- Labels: Jazzland Recordings, Smalltown Supersound
- Website: www.kornstad.com

Håkon Games Kornstad (born 5 April 1977 in Oslo, Norway) is a Norwegian jazz musician (tenor saxophone, bass saxophone, flute and live looping) and classically trained singer (tenor), known from bands such as Wibutee and Kornstad Trio, and collaborations with musicians such as Ketil Bjørnstad, Anja Garbarek, Live Maria Roggen, Bugge Wesseltoft, Sidsel Endresen, Paal Nilssen-Love, Mats Eilertsen, Knut Reiersrud, Jon Christensen, Eivind Aarset, and Pat Metheny.

== Career ==
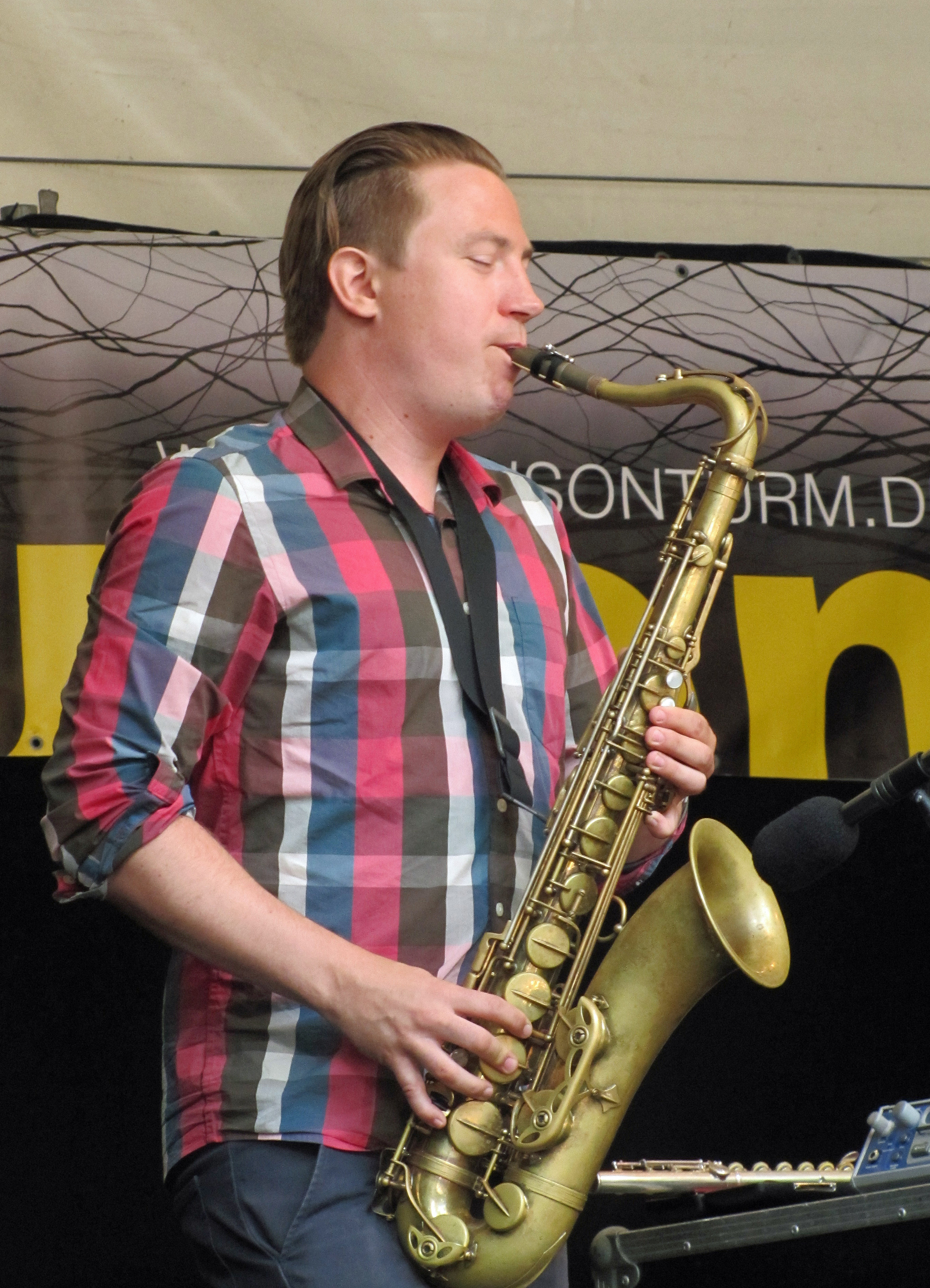
Kornstad in 2010

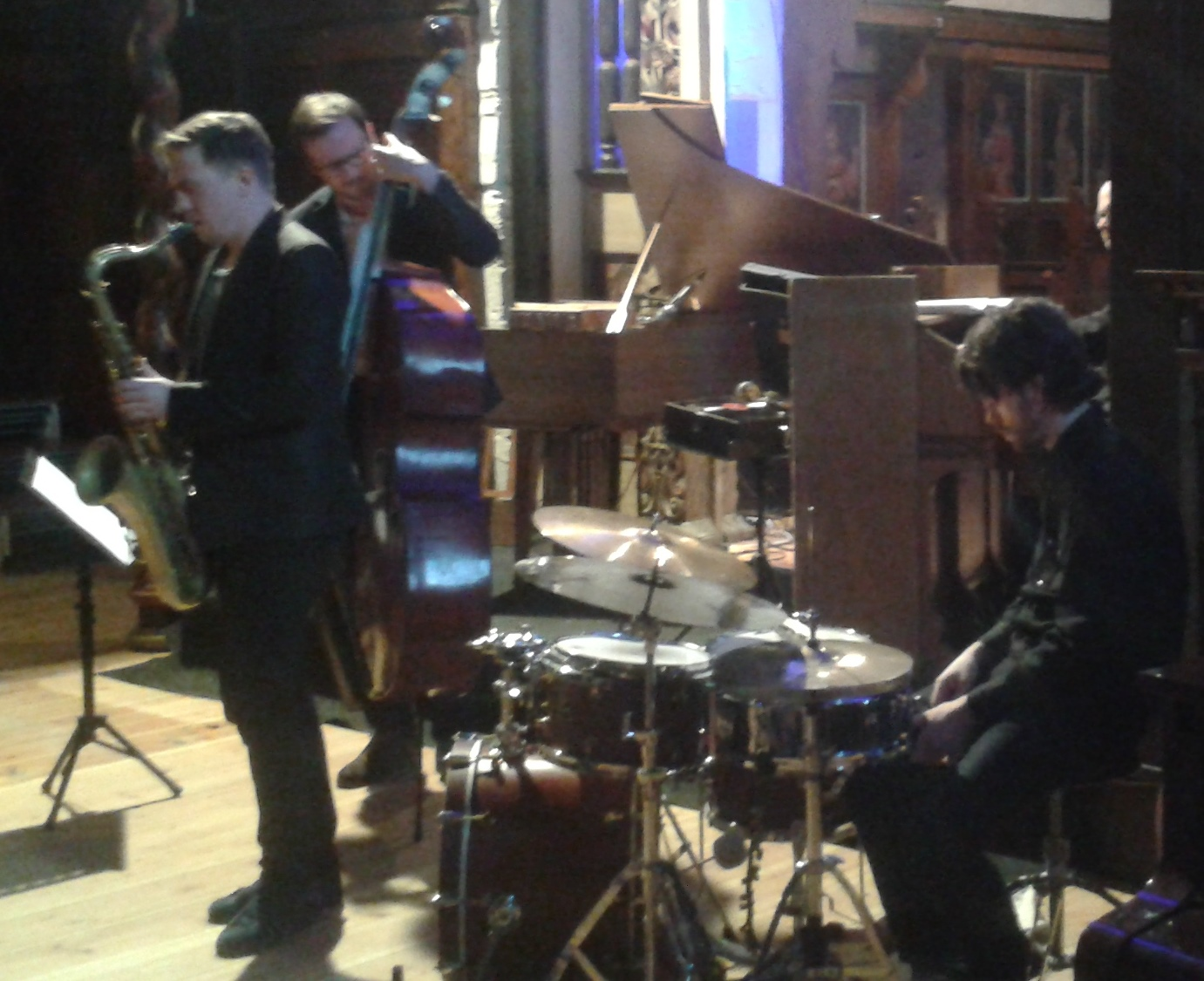
Kornstad's Tenor Battle in Vangskyrkja at the 2016 Vossajazz.

Kornstad was educated in the Jazz Program at Trondheim Musikkonservatorium. During his studies he founded the jazz trio Triangle, together with Per Zanussi (bass) and Wetle Holte (drums). Later, Erlend Skomsvoll (piano) and Live Maria Roggen (vocals) joined the band, and this lineup evolved to become the band Wibutee (1998). He also put together the Håkon Kornstad Trio with Paal Nilssen-Love and Mats Eilertsen (1998–2003). Kornstad's collaboration with Håvard Wiik was manifested in two albums of duo recordings in 2001. He was involved with the free improvisation bands Tri-Dim and No Spaghetti Edition, and started the band Atomic in 2000. Kornstad has also been part of the bands of Bugge Wesseltoft (1999–2003), Anja Garbarek (2006–), and Sidsel Endresen (2008–).

Since 2003 Kornstad has focused on his solo projects, in which he plays acoustic saxophones along with electronics in an improvised setting, usually giving solo performances. These have also featured guest appearances from Knut Reiersrud, Ingebrigt Håker Flaten, Jon Christensen and beatboxer Julian Sommerfelt. In addition to saxophones and electronics, Kornstad plays something he calls the "flutonett", which is a flute coupled with a clarinet mouthpiece.

During a stay in New York in 2009 Kornstad became interested in opera, and began taking singing lessons with teachers there. From the autumn of 2011 he has been a student at Operahøgskolen (KHiO), and debuted as a tenor singer in Den Norske Opera in February 2012 as Il Podesta in a student production of the Mozart opera La finta giardiniera. In 2011 he was nominated for the Spellemannprisen, in the category of This Year's Jazz Record, for Symphonies in My Head (Jazzland, 2011). He then presented his new project, Tenor Battle, combining opera and jazz, at the International Jazz Festival Nattjazz in Bergen. The new band could best be described as a sort of updated salon orchestra, inspired by the LP era, where jazz standards coexist with opera arias and ballads are followed by improvisations in the known Kornstad style. Kornstad is known as one of the premier Norwegian saxophonists, with a tone so hot that one can be melted freely, his voice has the same impact.

== Honors ==
- 2002: Kongsberg Jazz Award, within the Håkon Kornstad Trio
- 2012: Enlisted as "Talent deserving further recognition" on tenor saxophone in Down Beat's annual critics poll
- 2014: Guinness Jazz in Europe Award
- 2015: Buddyprisen

== Discography ==
=== As leader ===
Solo albums

- Single Engine (Jazzland Recordings, 2007), with Bugge Wesseltoft (Hammond B3 Organ), Knut Reiersrud (guitar), Ingebrigt Håker Flaten (double bass)
- Dwell Time (Jazzland Recordings, 2009), with recordings from Sofienberg kirke, (Jan Erik Kongshaug (sound engineer), produced by Kornstad)
- Symphonies in My Head (Jazzland Recordings, 2011), with recordings from Sofienberg kirke, (produced by Kornstad)

With Håkon Kornstad Trio

- Space available (Jazzland Recordings, 2001)
- Live from Kongsberg (Jazzland Recordings, 2003)

With Håkon Kornstad Band

- Tenor Battle (Jazzland Recordings, 2015)

With Kornstad Ensemble and the Norwegian Radio Orchestra

- Kornstad + KORK Live (Grappa Music, 2017)

=== As co-leader ===
With Wibutee

- Newborn Thing (Jazzland Recordings, 1998)
- Eight Domestic Challenges (Jazzland Recordings, 2001)
- Playmachine (Jazzland Recordings, 2004)
- Sweet Mental (Sonne Disk, 2006)

With Tri-Dim

- Tri-Dimprovisations (bp, 1999)
- Tri-Dim feat. Barry Guy (Sofa Recordings, 2001)

With Håvard Wiik (duo)

- Eight Tunes We Like (Moserobie, 2005)
- The Bad and the Beautiful (Moserobie, 2006)

With Maria Kannegaard

- Maryland (Moserobie, 2008)
- Maryland – Live! (Moserobie, 2009)

With Ingebrigt Håker Flaten and Jon Christensen

- Mitt hjerte alltid vanker (Compunctio, 2011)
- Mitt hjerte alltid vanker II (Compunctio, 2011)

With others

- Schlinger (Smalltown Supersound, 2003), with Paal Nilssen-Love
- Jazzland Community (Jazzland Recordings, 2007), with various artists
- Rite (Grappa, 2008), with Unni Løvlid
- Elise (Compunctio, 2008), with Ingebrigt Håker Flaten

=== As sideman ===
With Ketil Bjørnstad

- A Passion for John Donne (ECM, 2014)

With Sternklang

- My Time is Yours (dBut, 2003)
- Transistor Beach (dBut, 2006)

With No Spaghetti Edition

- Listen ... and tell me what it was (Sofa Recordings, 2001)
- Pasta variations (Sofa Recordings, 2002)

With others

- Glow (Curling Legs, 2000), with Jacob Young
- Moving (Jazzland Recordings, 2001), with Bugge Wesseltoft
- Open Reminder (Melektronikk, 2004), with ARM
- Retrospective (F Communications, 2006), with Laurent Garnier
- "Liarbird" (Jazzland Recordings, 2011), with Ola Kvernberg

Awards
Preceded by Christian Wallumrød	Recipient of the Kongsberg Jazz Award; 2002	Succeeded by Live Maria Roggen
Preceded by Erlend Skomsvoll	Recipient of the Buddyprisen; 2015	Succeeded by Live Maria Roggen
