= (Du är så) Yeah Yeah Wow Wow =

1999 song by Martin Svensson

Single by Martin Svensson

from the album En helt vanlig Svensson
- Released: March 1999
- Recorded: 1999
- Genre: Pop
- Label: UNI
- Songwriter: Martin Svensson

Music video
- "(Du är så) Yeah Yeah Wow Wow" on YouTube

"(Du är så) Yeah Yeah Wow Wow" (meaning (You are so) Yeah Yeah Wow Wow) is a Swedish language song written and sung by the Swedish singer Martin (full name Martin Svensson) who got his big break in the 1999 edition of the Swedish Melodifestivalen. It finished in 4th place overall. The lyrics are critical of the advertising profession. Martin also made an English language version with the title of "(You Are So) Yeah Yeah Wow Wow".

Despite not winning the Melodifestivalen, the song became very popular, and was released as a single on 11 March 1999. It topped the Swedish Singles Chart at for two consecutive weeks on the charts of 8 and 15 April 1999.

== Covers ==
- In 2003, the group Heartquake made a cover version of the song. It appears on the Heartquake album Schlager kidz and the compilation album Hits Kidz Sommarlov.
- Swedish singer Jimmy Jansson sang it three times in talent show Fame Factory.
- The band Skyscraper covered the song as "Yeah Yeah Wow Wow" on their album No. 1.

== Charts ==
Chart (1999)	Peak position
Sweden (Sverigetopplistan)	1
