= Magnus Broo =

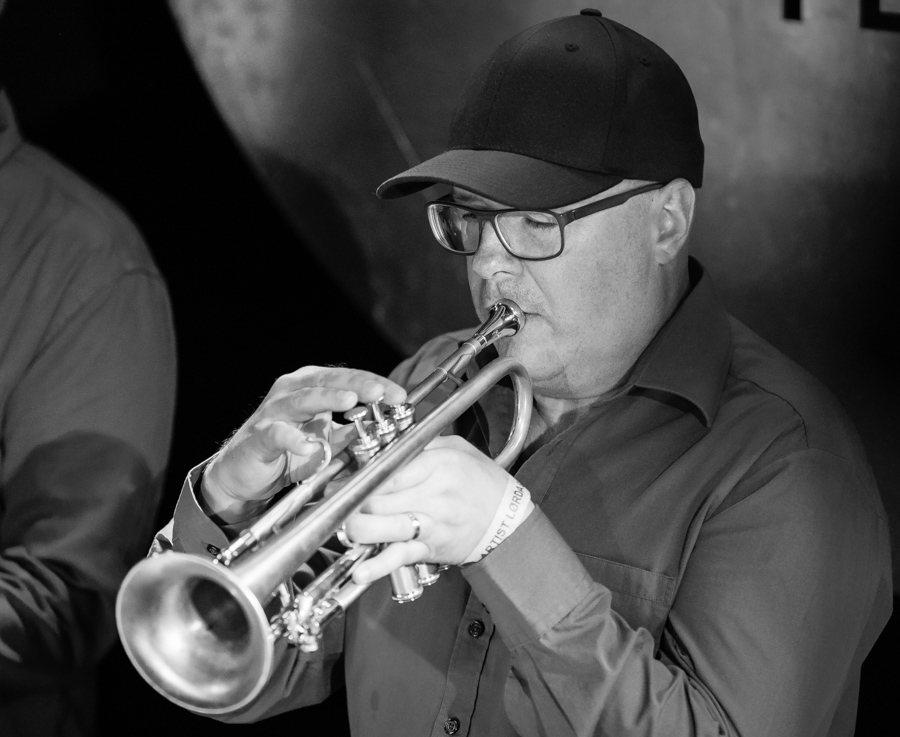
- Magnus Broo performing at Kongsberg Jazzfestival 2019

Background information
- Born: 27 June 1965 (age 59); Husqvarna, Västervik
- Origin: Sweden
- Genres: Jazz
- Occupation(s): Musician and composer
- Instrument: Trumpet
- Labels: ECM
- Website: Magnus Broo on Myspace

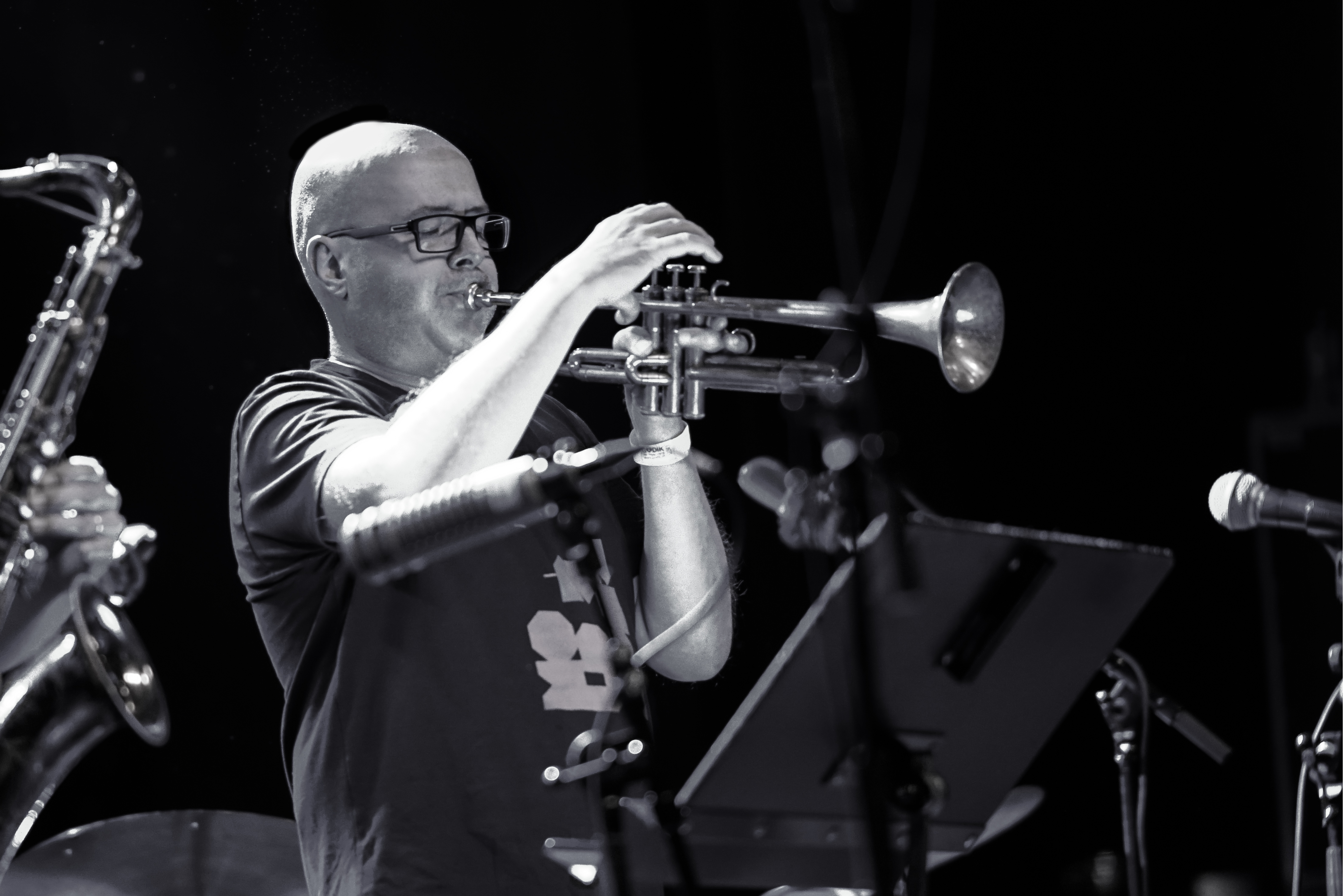
Magnus Broo at Aarhus Festival, Denmark 2017

Magnus Broo (born 27 June 1965) is a Swedish jazz musician (trumpet) known from own recordings and collaboration with Norwegian jazz musicians like in the band Atomic.

== Career ==
Broo was born in Husqvarna, Västervik, Småland, the son of a trumpeter, and participated in the Visby big band before he attended musical training at North Texas State University (1984–1990). Back in Sweden, he was incorporated into Fredrik Norén Band (1991–1999), and also collaborated in the orchestra of Lennart Åberg.

Broo's expression is a continuation of free jazz and Ornette Coleman's style from the 1960'th, and he is central in the Norwegian/Swedish band Atomic (1999–). He also leads his own 'Magnus Broo Quartet with Torbjörn Gulz on piano, Mattias Welin on bass and Jonas Holgersson on drums. They released the albums Sudden Joy (1999), Levitaton (2001), Sugar Promise(2003) and Pain Body (2008). Moreover, he also collaborates in Fredrik Nordström Quintet.

== Discography ==
=== Solo albums ===
The Magnus Broo Quartet

- 1999: Sudden Joy (Dragon Records), live recording
- 2002: Levitation (Dragon Records)
- 2003: Sugarpromise (Moserobie Music)
- 2008: Painbody (Moserobie Music)

Magnus Broo Trio

- 2018: Rules (Moserobie Music)

Other projects

- 2008: Game (PNL), with Paal Nilssen-Love
- 2010: Swedish Wood (Moserobie)
- 2013: Bubble (Moserobie)

=== Collaborations ===
Within Atomic

- 2001: Feet Music (Jazzland Recordings)
- 2003: Boom Boom (Jazzland Recordings)
- 2004: Nuclear Assembly Hall (Okka Disk), with "School Days"
- 2005: The Bikini Tapes (Jazzland Recordings), live recording
- 2006: Happy New Ears (Jazzland Recordings)
- 2008: Retrograde (Jazzland Recordings)
- 2008: Distil (Okka Disk), with "School Days"
- 2010: Theater Tilters (Jazzland Recordings)
- 2011: Here Comes Everybody (Jazzland Recordings)
- 2013: There's A Hole in the Mountain (Jazzland Recordings)
- 2015: Lucidity (Jazzland Recordings)
- 2017: Six Easy Pieces (Odin Records)
- 2018: Pet Variations (Odin Records)

With Fredrik Nordström Quintet

- 2004: Moment (Moserobie Music)
- 2005: No Sooner Said Than Done (Moserobie Music)
- 2008: Live in Coimbra (Clean Feed)

With Adam Lane, Ken Vandermark and Paal Nilssen-Love

- 2007: 4 Corners (Clean Feed)

Within "Boots Brown"

- 2007: Boots Brown (Slottet Records)
- 2014: Dashes To Dashes (Häpna Records)

Within "Angles"

- 2008: Every Woman Is A Tree (Clean Feed)
- 2010: Epileptical West : Live in Coimbra (Clean Feed)

With Marilyn Crispell

- 2009: Collaborations (Leo Records)

Within "The Godforgottens"

- 2009: Never Forgotten, Always Remembered (Clean Feed)

Within "IPA"

- 2009: Lorena (Bolage Records)
- 2011: It's A Delicate Thing (Bolage Records)

Within "The Resonance Ensemble"

- 2011: Kafka in Flight (Not Two Records)
- 2012: What Country Is This? (Not Two Records)
- 2013: Head Above Water, Feet Out of the Fire (Not Two Records)

Within "Platform"

- 2012: Takes Off (Clean Feed)

Within "Angles 9"

- 2013: In Our Midst (Clean Feed)
- 2014: Injury (Clean Feed)
