= Martin Svensson (singer) =

Swedish singer, musician (born 1978)

- Born: 11 March 1978 (age 48)
- Origin: Kalmar, Sweden
- Genres: Pop, rock
- Occupations: Singer, songwriter, musician, author
- Instruments: Vocals, guitar, piano
- Years active: 1997–present
- Website: www.martinsvensson.net

Martin Svensson also known as Martin (born 11 March 1978) is a Swedish singer, author and musician.

== Music ==
He started as a solo artist. His debut single "Rymdraket" from his 1997 debut album Pojkdrömmar. His biggest hit remains though "(Du är så) Yeah Yeah Wow Wow", a song he wrote himself and sang at Melodifestivalen 1999 in a bid to represent Sweden in the 1999 Eurovision Song Contest in Jerusalem. He finished 4th overall, but the single reached the top of the Swedish Singles Chart. There was also an English version of the song entitled "(You Are So) Yeah Yeah Wow Wow".

He also took part in Melodifestivalen 2002 with the song "Du och jag (i hela världen)", but was eliminated from first round finishing seventh in day 2 of the competition. In 2003, he formed a Swedish rock band called Nina Rochelle

== Author ==
Martin Svensson also began a career as a writer with Hej! Mitt namn var Elton Persson (Hello! My name vas Elton Persson) followed up by Din heder (Meryem's honour) in 2009.

== Personal life ==
Svensson was born in Kalmar, Sweden. His family moved to Varberg in 1981.

In 1998, Svensson met Swedish-Kurdish pop singer Dilbihar Demirbag known as Dilba at a party, and they later married in the summer of 2000. A divorce was filed in 2002.

== Discography ==
=== Solo ===
==== Albums ====
Title	Year	Peak positions
Title	Year	SWE
Pojkdrömmar	1997	38
En helt vanlig Svensson	1999	26
Lyxproblem och moderna storningar	2000	–
Martin och Sibirien	2002	–

==== Singles ====
Title	Year	Peak positions	Album
Title	Year	SWE	Album
"Rymdraket"	1997	14	Pojkdrömmar
"Videofilm"	1998	12	Pojkdrömmar
"Teater känns det som"	1998	20	Pojkdrömmar
"(Du är så) Yeah Yeah Wow Wow"	1999	1	En helt vanlig Svensson
"Fiskar som viskar"	1999	21	En helt vanlig Svensson
"Dumkåt"	2000	21	Lyxproblem och moderna storningar
"Jag vill inte motionera"	2000	25	Lyxproblem och moderna storningar
"Du och jag (i hela världen)"	2002	52	Martin och Sibirien
"VM-guld 2002"	2002	10	Martin och Sibirien

=== With Nina Rochelle ===
Albums

- 2003: Om Sverige vill ha det så
- 2005: Mörkertal
- 2006: Måndagsfolket

Singles

- 2003: "Taxi 43"
- 2003: "(Happy) Jag hatar att det är så"
- 2004: "Stockholm kommer förstöra mig"
- 2005: "Mörkertal"
- 2005: "Rött ljus"
- 2006: "Måndagsfolket"

== Bibliography ==
Novels

- 2007: Hej! Mitt namn var Elton Persson
- 2009: Din heder

Children / Youth

- 2010: När inget annat hjälper
- 2011: Musik för tondöva
- 2012: Knacka tre gånger och andra spöhistorier
- 2013: Min första bakbok
- 2013: Glutenfritt är gott
- 2014: Julius och pusskalaset
- 2014: Julius spelar teater
- 2015: Julius på solsemester
- 2015: Julius och mobbarna
- 2015: Bästa lekboken
- 2016: Vad är grejen med kroppen?
- 2016: Julius firar jul
- 2016: Sanningen om Dixie del 1
- 2016: Sanningen om Dixie del 2
- 2017: Sanningen om Dixie del 3

Editing and narration

- 2016: Skattarkammarön
- 2016: Robin Hood
- 2017: Varghunden
- 2017: Trollkarlen från Oz

Joint books

- 2011: Dingo Dingo - Den manliga frigörelsen (with Bob Hansson and Leif Eriksson)
- 2014: Johannes Brost Dö inte nyfiken (with Johannes Brost and Leif Eriksson)
- 2015: 501 svenska platser du måste se innan du dör (with Leif Eriksson)
- 2016: Alexander Gustafsson – The Mauler (with Alexander Gustafsson and Leif Eriksson)
- 2017: 101 svenska öar du måste se innan du dör (with Leif Eriksson)
- 2017: Samantha Fox – Min berättelse (with Samantha Fox and Leif Eriksson)
- 2017: Joakim Lundell – Monster (with Joakim Lundell and Leif Eriksson)
