= Generator X (band) =

Norwegian jazz band

- Origin: Oslo, Norway
- Genres: Jazz
- Years active: 1998–present
- Labels: Jazzland Recordings; Rune Grammofon
- Members: Christian Wallumrød; Ole Morten Vågan; Audun Kleive
- Past members: Jan Bang; Geir Østensjø; Ståle Storløkken; Arve Henriksen
- Website: Puma official Website

Generator X (established 1998 in Oslo) is a Norwegian Jazz band initiated by Audun Kleive. Most of the tracks for their first album were conceived live, during the band’s first sessions together, retaining the spontaneity of the genre. Framework is a metal/electronica composition, energetic and alarmingly intense. Mainstay or Obelisk are more contained, evolving slowly, following the strolls of the musicians, obviously at ease with each other, holding the convulsions, slowing down the pace, changing tempo, almost grounding the machinery to a complete halt at a few occasions, avoiding a premature climax. The symbiosis is perfect, almost palpable.

Ohmagoddabl (2003) are mixed in Bill Laswell's Turteltone Studios, New York.

== Band members ==
Current members

- Christian Wallumrød – keyboards
- Ole Morten Vågan – bass guitar
- Audun Kleive – Drums

Former members

- Jan Bang – samples
- Geir Østensjø – Sound Design
- Ståle Storløkken – synthesizer
- Arve Henriksen – trumpet

== Discography ==
- 2000: Generator X (Jazzland Recordings)
- 2004: Ohmagoddabl (Jazzland Recordings)
- 2012: Attack (POL-selection)
