= Inscape–Tableaux =

Studio album by Barry Guy
- Released: 2001
- Recorded: May 18 and 19, 2000
- Studio: Rote Fabrik, Zürich, Switzerland
- Genre: Free jazz
- Length: 1:06:40
- Label: Intakt Records; CD 066

Inscape–Tableaux is an album by bassist Barry Guy. It was recorded on May 18 and 19, 2000, at Rote Fabrik in Zürich, Switzerland, and was released in 2001 by Intakt Records. On the album, which features a seven-part composition by Guy, he plays bass and directs members of his New Orchestra: Evan Parker and Mats Gustafsson on saxophone, Hans Koch on saxophone and clarinet, Herb Robertson on trumpet, Johannes Bauer on trombone, Per Åke Holmlander on tuba, Marilyn Crispell on piano, and Paul Lytton and Raymond Strid on percussion.

Guy recalled: "One of the impulses of putting together the band was to bring together acquaintances I've made in duo and trio situations – within the band, you have the Parker/Guy/Lytton trio, my trio with Mats Gustafsson and... Raymond Strid and the trio with Marilyn Crispell and Lytton... The process of having these concerts and rehearsals together in such a concentrated way caused these various languages we have articulated over the years to converge as we built the piece."

== Reception ==
Professional ratings
Review scores
Source	Rating
AllMusic	4.5/5 stars
The Penguin Guide to Jazz	3.5/4 stars

In a review for AllMusic, Steve Loewy wrote: "There are so many levels on which this magnificent set of performances... can be appreciated... For one thing, there is Guy's brilliant writing, which permits the players... to flourish through individual solo contributions wrapped around kernels and flashes of magical insights... At heart, Guy is a landscape artist who paints broadly and passionately, but who pays careful attention to details... In the end, it is the broad strokes, the vision, the grandeur that most impress. A magnificent achievement."

The authors of the Penguin Guide to Jazz Recordings awarded the album 3½ stars, and stated: "this beautifully constructed piece is perfectly weighted for these forces... Guy's conception unfolds organically and with an internal logic... It's an intensely powerful experience."

Writing for One Final Note, Alan Jones called the music "wonderfully complicated," "in a class by itself," and "an astonishing accomplishment that should be experienced."

== Track listing ==
Composed by Barry Guy.

1. "Part I" – 14:42
2. "Part II" – 5:32
3. "Part III" – 10:38
4. "Part IV" – 8:38
5. "Part V" – 6:05
6. "Part VI" – 10:26
7. "Part VII" – 10:40

== Personnel ==
- Barry Guy – director, bass
- Evan Parker – saxophone
- Mats Gustafsson – saxophone
- Hans Koch – saxophone, clarinet
- Herb Robertson – trumpet
- Johannes Bauer – trombone
- Per Åke Holmlander – tuba
- Marilyn Crispell – piano
- Paul Lytton – percussion
- Raymond Strid – percussion
