= Per Zanussi =

Italian–Norwegian jazz musician

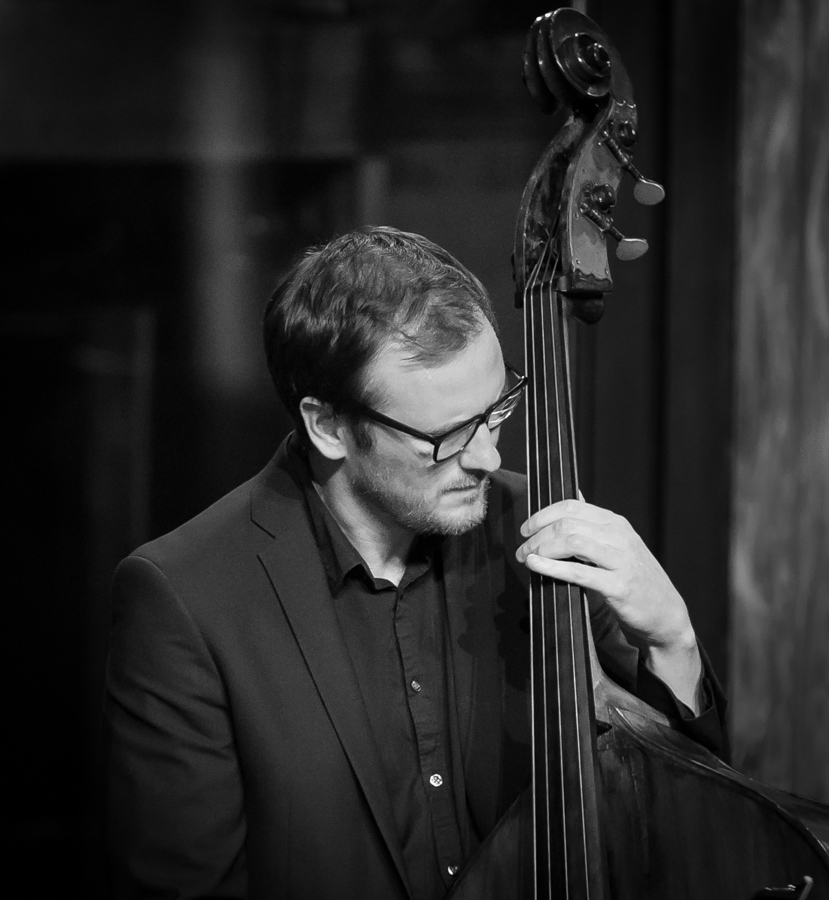
- Zanussi with Håkon Kornstad's Tenor Battle at Oslo Jazzfestival 2016

Background information
- Born: 1977 (age 48–49); Oslo, Norway
- Genres: Jazz
- Occupations: Musician, composer
- Instrument: Upright bass
- Member of: Zanussi Five
- Website: www.perzanussi.com

Per Zanussi (born 1977) is an Italian–Norwegian jazz musician (upright bass) and composer, known from several bands and releases such as with Hamid Drake, Louis Moholo, Paal Nilssen-Love, Bobby Bradford, Sabir Mateen, Franklin Kiermyer, Stephen O'Malley, Axel Dörner, Petter Wettre, Fred Lonberg-Holm, Bugge Wesseltoft, Mats Gustafsson, Kjetil Møster, Kevin Norton, Ivar Grydeland, Ernesto Rodrigues, Tetuzi Akiyama, and Håvard Wiik.

== Career ==
Zanussi was born in Oslo and was educated on the Jazz program at Trondheim Musikkonservatorium and at Norges Musikkhøgskole. He was one of the initiators of the band Wibutee from Trondheim (1996–2004), with Håkon Kornstad and Wetle Holte.

Since 2001 he has led the "Zanussi Five" with saxophone lineup Kjetil Møster, Rolf-Erik Nystrøm and Eirik Hegdal, and percussionist Per Oddvar Johansen, a project that has produced three albums. He also contributes to the "MZN3" with Kjetil Møster and Kjell Nordeson, the "Trespass Trio" with Martin Kuchen and Raymond Strid, the Jazzmob and the "Crimetime Orchestra".

== Discography ==
=== Solo albums ===
With Zanussi Five

- 2004: Zanussi Five (Moserobie Prod)
- 2007: Alborado (Moserobie Prod)
- 2010: Ghost Dance (Moserobie Prod)
- 2014: Live in Coimbra (Clean Feed)

With Trondheim Jazz Orchestra

- 2011: Morning Songs (MNJ)

=== Collaborations ===
With Wunderkammer

- 1999: Wunderkammer (Plateselskapet Skarv)
- 2002: Today I Cannot Hear Music (HoneyMilk)

With Petter Wettre

- 2002: Household Name (Household)
- 2004: Hallmark Moments (Household)

With Wibutee

- 2004: Playmachine (Jazzland)

With Frode Gjerstad

- 2005: Born to Collapse (Circulasione Totale), including Anders Hana and Morten Olsen

With the trio 'MZN3' including Kjetil Møster and Kjell Nordeson

- 2005: MZN3 (Jazzaway)

With Jazzmob

- 2005: Infernal Machine (Jazzaway)
- 2006: Flashback (Jazzaway), from Moldejazz

With Jon Eberson Trio

- 2006: Bring It On (Jazzaway)

With Martin Küchen Trio

- 2007: Live at Glenn Miller Café (Ayler)

With Trespass Trio

- 2009: ...Was There to Illuminate the Sight Sky... (Clean Feed)
- 2012: Bruder Beda (Clean Feed)
- 2013: Human Encore (Clean Feed), including with Joe McPhee

With Marilyn Crispell

- 2009: Collaborations (Leo)

With Circulasione Totale Orchestra

- 2009: Bandwidth (Rune Grammofon)
- 2011: PhilaOslo (Circulasione Totale)

With Crimetime Orchestra

- 2009: Atomic Symphony (Jazzaway), featuring Sonny Simmons and KORK

With Jørn Øien Trio

- 2010: Digging in the Dark (Bolage)

With S/S Motsol

- 2011: Parallel Pleasures (Creative Sources)

With Mette Henriette

- 2015: Mette Henriette (ECM)
