= Håvard Wiik =

Norwegian jazz pianist and composer

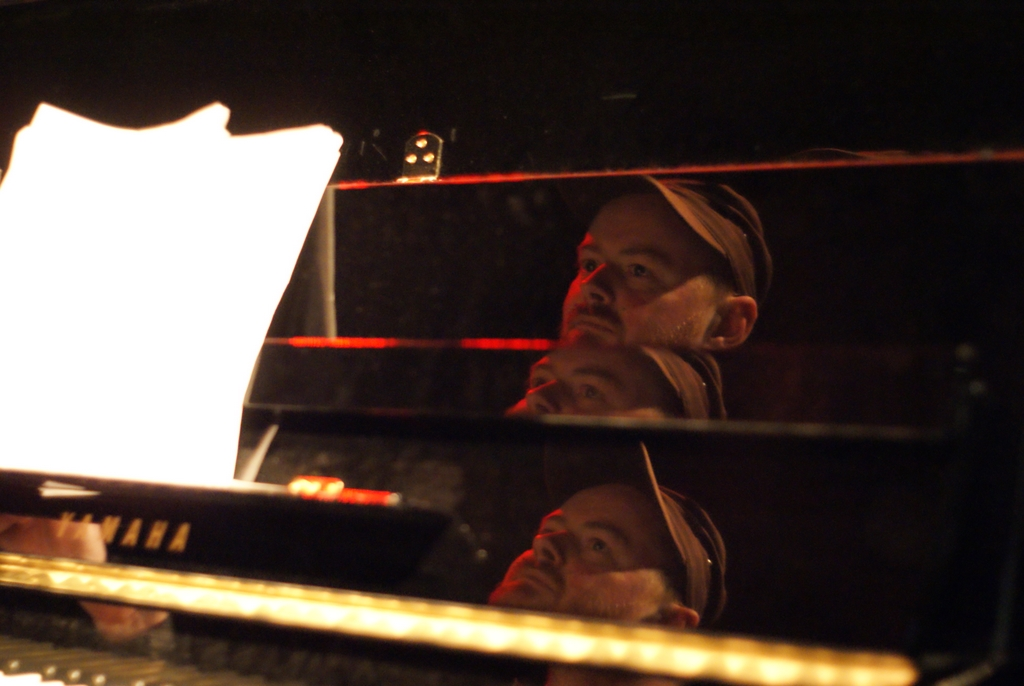

Background information
- Born: Håvard Skarpnes Wiik; 10 March 1975 (age 51); Kristiansund, Møre og Romsdal, Norway
- Genres: Jazz
- Occupations: Musician, composer
- Instrument: Piano
- Labels: Moserobie Music Production, Jazzwerkstatt, Songlines Recordings

Håvard Skarpnes Wiik (born 10 March 1975) is a Norwegian jazz pianist and composer, known from a number of recordings with bands like Atomic, and performances with musicians like Petter Wettre, Ola Kvernberg and Stian Carstensen.

== Career ==
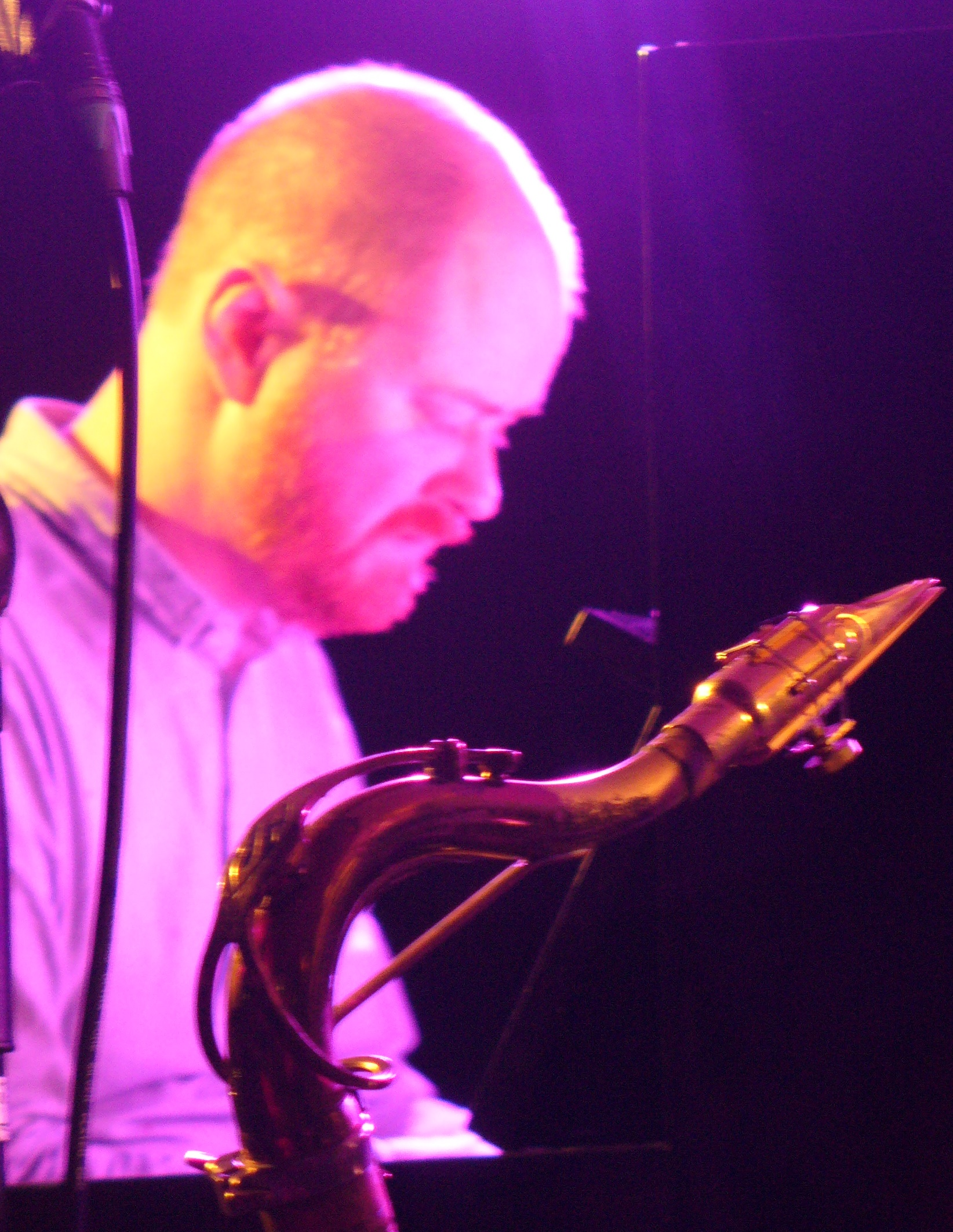
Håvard Wiik at Vossajazz 2014.

Wiik caused sensation at 17 years old in a concert at the Moldejazz, with bassist Steinar Raknes, as the "Wiikrak Duo". He attended the jazz program at Trondheim musikkonservatorium from 1994 to 96, where he and fellow students established the jazz band Element.

After moving to Oslo he has been a key player in many band projects, such as Atomic, "Free Fall", "Atomic Schooldays", a duo with Håkon Kornstad, a new project with Axel Dörner and Fredrik Ljungkvist. He has been a preferred choice as collaborator with giants in jazz, Kenny Wheeler, Lee Konitz, Joe Lovano representing the old school, and Ken Vandermark being consistent collaborator, for example the band Motif. He also led the Håvard Wiik Trio with Mats Eilertsen (bass) and Per Oddvar Johansen (drums), to release Postures (Jazzland, 2003).

Wiik was recognized as "Artist in residence" at the Moldejazz (2004). At the Kongsberg Jazz Festival (2006), he was awarded the Vital prize, giving him the opportunity to perform as solo artist, and release the album Palinode (2007). He also started his own H.W. Trio, releasing Postures (2003), performing his own compositions. He transformed the trio to The Arcades Project (2007). In this version of the trio we find Håkon Mjåset Johansen on drums and Ole Morten Vågan on bass. They have also been involved within bands such as Urban Connection, Come Shine, Bugge Wesseltoft’s New Conception of Jazz.

== Honors ==
- 1999: Have no fear Award, by Oslo Jazzradio
- 2004: Artist in residence, at Moldejazz
- 2005: Artist of the year, at SoddJazz
- 2006: Spellemannprisen, in the class Jazz
- 2006: Kongsberg Jazz Award

== Discography ==
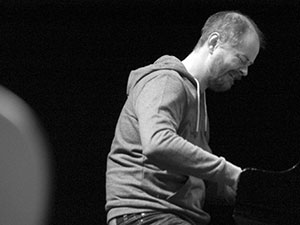
Håvard Wiik

=== Solo albums ===
- Postures (2002)
- The Arcades project (2007), Havard Wiik Trio
- Palinode (2007), solo
- The Arcades Project (2007),

=== Collaborations ===
With Atomic

- Boom Boom (2002)
- Nuclear assembly hall (2003)
- The Bikini tapes (Jazzland Recordings, 2006)
- Happy new ears! (2006), awarded Spellemannprisen 2006
- Distil (2006, Atomic & School Days in Chicago)
- Retrograde (2007–08)

Duo with Håkon Kornstad

- Eight tunes we like (2003)
- The bad and the beautiful (2006)

With Free Fall

- Amsterdam funk (2004)
- The point in a line (2006)
- Gray scale (2010)

With Motif

- 2008: Apo Calypso (Jazzland Recordings)
- 2010: Facienda (Jazzland Records)
- 2011: Art Transplant (Clean Feed Records), with Axel Dörner
- 2016: My Head Is Listening (Clean Feed Records)

Duo with François Houle

- Aves (Songlines Recordings, 2013)

As sideman

- Pig virus (1996), with Petter Wettre Quartet
- September song (1998), with Jens Arne Molvær
- Bjørn Johansen in memoriam (2003), with Petter Wettre
- Backwards into the Backwood (2004), with Stian Carstensen
- Playmachine (2004), with Wibutee
- Hallmark moments, with Petter Wettre
- À la Cour (2008), with Mads La Cour
- Apo Calypso (2008), with Motif
- A Fine Day In Berlin (Relay Recordings, 2013), with The Tim Daisy Trio featuring Clayton Thomas
- Die Anreicherung (Jazzwerkstatt, 2013), with Axel Dörner

Awards
Preceded by Solveig Slettahjell	Recipient of the Kongsberg Jazz Award; 2006	Succeeded by Morten Qvenild
