= Atomic (band) =

Norwegian/Swedish jazz band

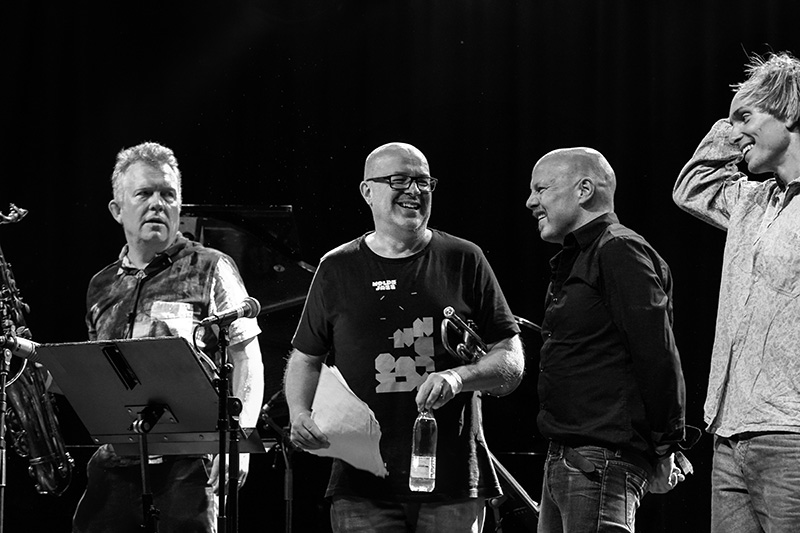
- Atomic at Aarhus Festival, Denmark 2017; Fredrik Ljungkvist (s), Magnus Broo (t), Ingebrigt Håker Flaten (b); Hans Hulbækmo (d)

Background information
- Origin: Sweden, Norway
- Genres: Jazz
- Years active: 1999–present
- Members: Magnus Broo; Fredrik Ljungkvist; Håvard Wiik; Ingebrigt Håker Flaten; Hans Hulbækmo
- Past members: Paal Nilssen-Love
- Website: www.atomicjazz.com

Atomic is a Norwegian/Swedish jazz band formed in 1999, composed of musicians from the top stratum of the European jazz circuit. Atomic has been billed as one of the most respected "new" constellations in jazz. In 2014, original drummer Paal Nilssen-Love was replaced by Hans Hulbækmo.

== Members ==
- Magnus Broo – trumpet (Stockholm, Sweden)
- Fredrik Ljungkvist – saxophones, clarinet (Stockholm, Sweden)
- Håvard Wiik – piano (Oslo, Norway)
- Ingebrigt Håker Flaten – double bass (Oslo, Norway)
- Hans Hulbækmo – drums

== Former members ==
- Paal Nilssen-Love – drums (Oslo, Norway)
- Håkon Kornstad – saxophone (Oslo, Norway)

== Discography ==
- Feet Music (Jazzland, 2001)
- Boom Boom (Jazzland, 2003)
- Nuclear Assembly Hall (with School Days; Okka Disk, 2004)
- The Bikini Tapes (Jazzland, 2005)
- Happy New Ears! (Jazzland, 2006)
- Retrograde (Jazzland, 2008)
- Distil (with School Days; Okka Disk, 2008)
- Theater Tilters Vol. 1 (Jazzland, 2010)
- Theater Tilters Vol. 2 (Jazzland, 2010)
- Here Comes Everybody (Jazzland, 2011)
- There's a Hole in the Mountain (Jazzland, 2013)
- Lucidity (Jazzland, 2015)
- Six Easy Pieces (Odin, 2017)
- Pet Variations (Odin, 2018)

== See also ==
- Jazzland Records
- Odin Records

Awards
Preceded by Come Shine	Recipient of the Jazz Spellemannprisen; 2003	Succeeded by Solveig Slettahjell
Preceded by Hans Mathisen	Recipient of the Jazz Spellemannprisen; 2006	Succeeded by Petter Wettre
