= Mette Henriette =

Norwegian saxophonist and composer

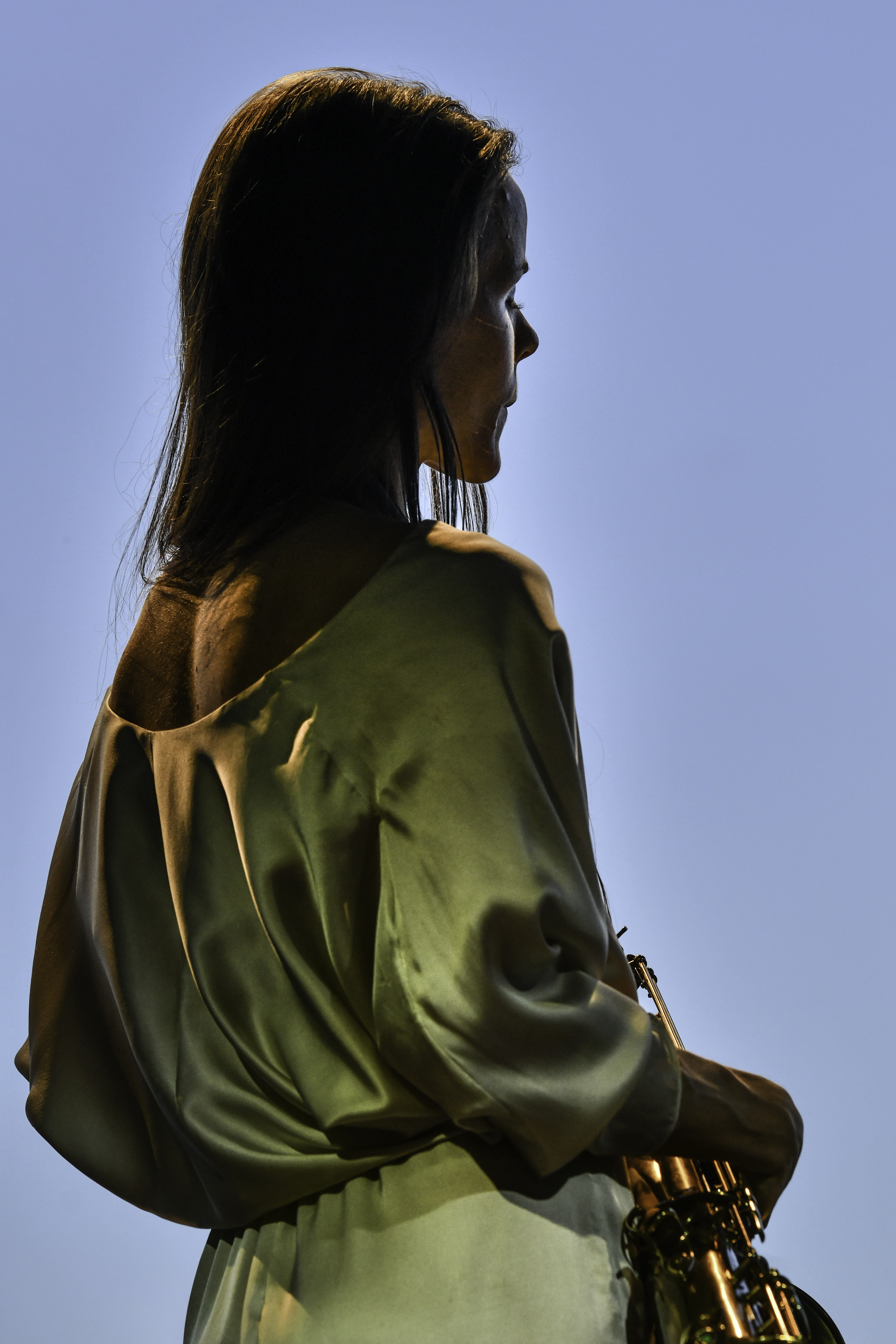
- Henriette in 2023

Background information
- Genres: Avant-garde jazz, chamber jazz
- Occupations: Performing artist and composer
- Instrument: Saxophone
- Label: ECM Records
- Website: mettehenriette.com

Mette Henriette Martedatter Rølvåg is a Norwegian performing artist, saxophonist, band leader and composer.

== Background ==
Mette Henriette grew up in Trondheim surrounded by a vibrant music scene and she got involved with performing arts at a young age, establishing her own ensembles and touring with musicians from jazz conservatories in Norway and New York, before she left her hometown to work on commissions and projects Internationally. Since then Mette Henriette has been living and working in New York, London, Paris, Svalbard and Oslo.

== Career ==
In 2015, Mette Henriette became the first artist to release a double debut album on the renowned jazz record label ECM Records. The album includes 90 minutes of music which she composed over a period of 10 years for her trio and large ensemble, consisting of jazz, classical and tango musicians. The record was produced in collaboration with Manfred Eicher and recorded in Rainbow Studio with sound engineer Jan Erik Kongshaug. The album cover and photo series were photographed by Anton Corbijn.

"It is seldom I find someone I don't know in the music world when that someone is one who surprises you with their talent and presence, and Mette is one of these people with that rare quality. She has an other worldly appearance, utterly fascinating." — Anton Corbijn

In addition to her work as a performer and composer, Mette Henriette develops scenography, lighting design and choreographic concepts for her works for stage and screen. She did cross-disciplinary projects with a variety of artists including Marina Abramovic, Manfred Eicher, Hege Haagenrud, Darkside, Radik Tülüsh, CocoRosie, Valgeir Sigurdsson and more.

"Mette Henriette is different" — Marina Abramovic

== Selected works ==
Orchestra, Ensemble and Solo Music

- Ouverture I / This too (2020) for orchestra commissioned by Oslo Philharmonic and Klaus Mäkelä
- Ouverture II / Vega (2020) for orchestra commissioned by Oslo Philharmonic and Klaus Mäkelä
- Ouverture III / To You (2020) for orchestra commissioned by Oslo Philharmonic and Klaus Mäkelä
- — (2020) for piano trio, commissioned by Cikada
- Det dages (2021-2022) for string orchestra, commissioned by Arctic Philharmonic
- / (2022) for solo violin, commissioned by Lillehammer Art Museum and Eldbjørg Hemsing

Stage Productions and Performances

- Untitled (2014) Duo performance with Marina Abramovic at The Hole (NYC) curated by Anohni, CocoRosie, Kembra Pfahler
- Untitled (2015) audiovisual stage production for the abandoned island Vibrandsøy commissioned by Ultima and Concerts Norway
- Untitled (2016) audiovisual stage production premiered at Haus der Berliner Festspiele during Berlin Jazz Festival
- In Between (2017) performance for Athens Concert Hall commissioned by documenta14
- Sáivu (2017) opening concert of Riddu Riddu for the 100th anniversary of the Sámi rights assembly.
- Ilmmis (2021) trans-disciplinary stage production commissioned by Arctic Arts Festival, Manchester International Festival and Munch Museum

Music for stage productions

- EDDA (2016) Recorded theatre music with Valgeir Sigurdsson and CocoRosie for EDDA by Robert Wilson
- The Moon (2019) music composition for ballet choreographed by Jo Strømgren and BalletX

Film

- Háldi (2021) experimental art film based on Sámi mythology

Other

- The Scream (2013) appearance in performance art film directed by Marina Abramovic
- Solo performance on a sacred Sami stone at Trænafestivalen (2016)
- Artist residency at Edvard Munch's ateliers in Ekely (2017)
- Artist residency at Southbank Centre in London (2017)
- Artist residency at Artica Svalbard in Longyearbyen (2019)
- Bare et øieblik (2021) graphic score for book anthology curated and published by Munch Museum

== Discography ==
=== As a leader ===
- Mette Henriette (ECM Records, 2015)
- Drifting (ECM Records, 2023)

=== As a band member ===
- Live in The Hague with Nicolas Jaar & Group (Bandcamp, 2021)
- Aella (577 Records, 2012)
