= Fredrik Ljungkvist =

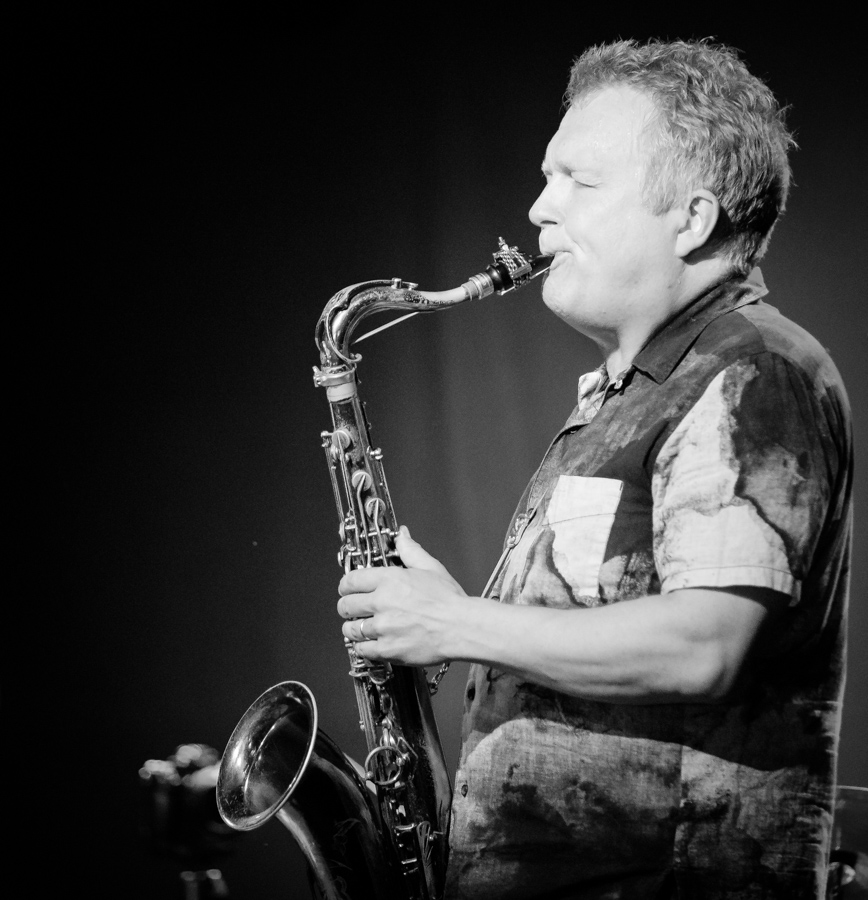
- Fredrik Ljungkvist performing at the 2018 Kongsberg Jazzfestival

Background information
- Born: 29 November 1969 (age 56); Kristinehamn, Värmland
- Origin: Sweden
- Genres: Jazz
- Occupations: Musician, composer
- Instruments: Saxophone, clarinet
- Labels: NorCD; Ozella Music
- Website: www.allaboutjazz.com/fredrik-ljungkvist-yun-kan-10-ten-by-eyal-hareuveni.php

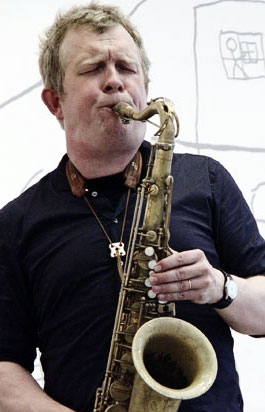
Fredrik Ljungkvist in Aarhus, Denmark (2011)

Håkan Fredrik Ljungkvist (born 29 November 1969 in Kristinehamn, Sweden), is a Swedish jazz musician (saxophone and clarinet), the son of saxophonist Håkan Ljungkvist and married to the jazz singer Lina Nyberg.

== Career ==
Ljungkvist was raised in Lidköping, and studied at the Royal College of Music in Stockholm (1989–93). As jazz student he played with jazz bands in Stockholm, like Fredrik Noren Band, Lina Nyberg Group and Per "Texas" Johansson band. In 1993 he formed his own Quartet with whom he released two albums.

In 2000 he composed a 30 minutes long piece for the Pipeline project, a collaboration between 16 Swedish and American musicians on initiative by the Svenska Rikskonserter. The piece was performed in Chicago and Sweden.

== Honors ==
- 2004: "Jazz kannan" as the musician of the year from the Swedish Jazz Society (Jazz i Sverige)

== Discography ==
=== Solo albums ===
Within Fredrik Ljungkvist Quartet

- 1995: Falling Papers (Dragon Records)
- 1997: Sonic Space (Prophone Records)

=== Collaborations ===
Within the "Swedish Open" hosted by Christian Falk

- 1999: Swedish Open (DaDa Records)
- 2002: Dirty Dancin (Telegram Records Stockholm)

Within the trio LSB (Ljungkvist, Raymond Strid and Johan Berthling)

- 2000: Walk, Stop, Look And Walk (Crazy Wisdom)
- 2003: Fungus (Moserobie Music Production)

Within Atomic

- 2001: Feet Music (Jazzland Recordings)
- 2003: Boom Boom (Jazzland Recordings)
- 2004: Nuclear Assembly Hall (Okka Disk), with "School Days"
- 2005: The Bikini Tapes (Jazzland Recordings), live recording
- 2006: Happy New Ears (Jazzland Recordings)
- 2008: Retrograde (Jazzland Recordings)
- 2008: Distil (Okka Disk), with "School Days"
- 2010: Theater Tilters (Jazzland Recordings)
- 2011: Here Comes Everybody (Jazzland Recordings)
- 2013: There's A Hole in the Mountain (Jazzland Recordings)

Within "Territory Band"

- 2002: Atlas (Okka Disk)
- 2004: Map Theory (Okka Disk)
- 2005: Company Switch (Okka Disk)
- 2006: New Horse for the White House (Okka Disk)
- 2007: Collide (Okka Disk)

Within the quartet "Parish" (Bobo Stenson, Mats Eilertsen, Thomas Strønen and Ljungkvist)

- 2004: Rica (Challenge Records)

Within the quintet "Firehouse"

- 2004: Live at Glenn Miller Café (Ayler Records)

Within the quintet "Yun Kan"

- 2004: Yun Kan 12345 (Caprice Records)
- 2007: Badaling (Caprice Records)
- 2013: Ten (Hoob Records)

With Marilyn Crispell

- 2009: Collaborations (Leo Records)

Within "The Deciders"

- 2013: We Travel The Airwaves (Jazzland Recordings)

With Wadada Leo Smith and TUMO

- 2013: And It Happened... TUM Records)
- 2013: Occupy The World TUM Records)

Within "Fire! Orchestra"

- 2013: Exit! (Rune Grammofon)
- 2014: Enter (Rune Grammofon)
- 2014: Second Exit (Rune Grammofon)

Within "Pipeline"

- 2013: Pipeline (Corbett vs. Dempsey)
