= Øyvind Hegg-Lunde =

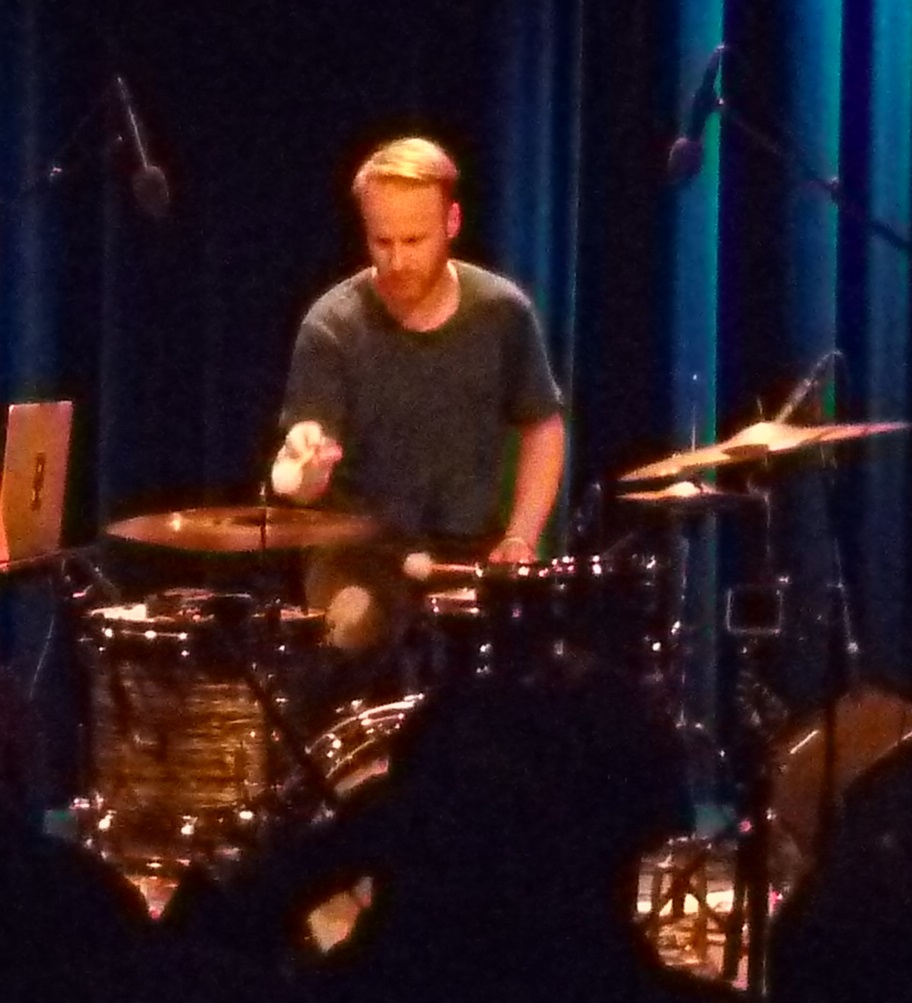
- Hegg-Lunde at the 2016 Nattjazz in Bergen, Norway.

Background information
- Born: 12 February 1982 (age 44)
- Origin: Norway
- Genres: Jazz, impro
- Occupations: Musician, composer
- Instrument: Drums
- Website: www.hegg-lunde.com

Øyvind Hegg-Lunde (born 12 February 1982 in Lærdal, Norway) is a Norwegian drummer and composer, raised in Borgund, Lærdal, but today resides in Bergen. He is known from collaborations with José Gonzalez, Junip, Arve Henriksen, Ståle Storløkken, Frode Haltli, Trygve Seim, Per Jørgensen, Terje Isungset, Håkon Kornstad, Kurt Johannessen, Stein Urheim, The Megaphonic Thrift, Odin Staveland, Odd Martin Skålnes, Erlend O. Nødtvedt, Nils Petter Molvær, Eivind Aarset and Marilyn Mazur.

== Career ==
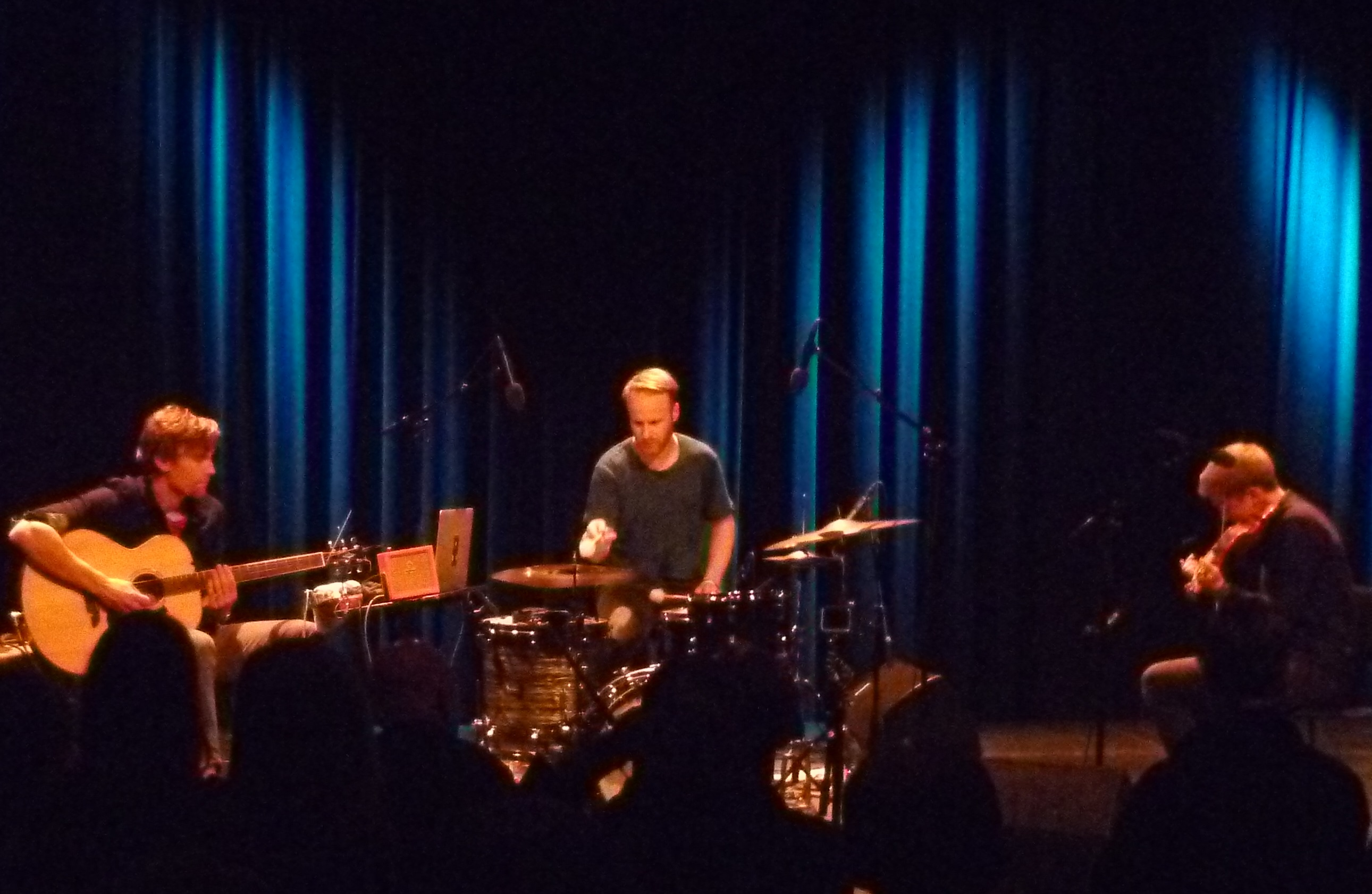
Hegg-Lunde and Stephan Meidell with Erlend Apneseth Trio at the 2016 Nattjazz.

Hegg-Lunde holds a Master's degree in jazz/improvised music at Griegakademiet and the Högskolan för scen och musik in Gothenburg. He is active in several separate projects, like Building Instrument, Erlend Apneseth Trio, Strings & Timpani, Electric Eye, BERG, Crab is Crap, Glow, Krachmacher, The Big Almost, PSST, Oliva/Abbuehl/Hegg-Lunde, Susanne Abbuehl.

Since 2001 he has toured clubs and festivals in Norway and Scandinavia, as well as Europe, America, Africa. He has collaborated with other art forms such as dance, poetry, theater, performance art and VJs. He has received various scholarships and awards, including Nattjazz sin Vitalpris.

Together with co-composer Stephan Meidell, Hegg-Lunde got brilliant reviews for his commissioned opening concert Voice & Strings & Timpani for the 2016 Nattjazz. It was presented with musicians like Mari Kvien Brunvoll, Eva Pfitzenmaier, Kim Åge Furuhaug, and Stein Urheim.

Hegg-Lunde has written commission work for among others Henie Onstad Kunstsenter, Ultimafestivalen, Nattjazz, Førdefestivalen, Bajazzfestivalen, Dance Company FRIKAR, Borealisfestivalen.

== Honors ==
- 2007: Vital/Nattjazz talent award
- 2010, 2014, 2017 and 2020: Art Grant - Bergen Kommune
- 2012: Art Grant - Hordaland Fylkeskommune
- 2016: Winner of Folkelarmprisen for the album Det Andre Rommet with Erlend Apneseth Trio
- 2016: Nominated for Norwegian Grammy for the album Det Andre Rommet with Erlend Apneseth Trio
- 2017: Winner of Grand Prix du Disque (Jazz) and Coup de Coeur in France, for the album Princess, with Stephan Oliva and Susanne Abbuehl
- 2017: Nominated for Norwegian Grammy for the album Åra with Erlend Apneseth Trio
- 2019: Winner of the Norwegian Grammy for the album Salika, Molika with Erlend Apneseth Trio
- 2020: Nominated to the Nordic Music Prize for the album Salika, Molika with Erlend Apneseth Trio
- 2021: Winner of the EDVARD-prize for the album Voice & Strings & Timpani
- 2021: Received the Vossajazz-prize
- 2021: Working grant - Bergen Kommune

== Discography ==
With 'Klangkameratane'

- 2007: Mess Is More (Øyvind Jazzforum)

With 'Jacon'

- 2009: 2009 (Gallop)

With Stein Urheim

- 2009: Three Sets Of Music (Soundlet)

With 'Defekt'

- 2010: Pete's Game Machine (Eclipse)

With Sarah Riedel

- 2010: Memories Of A Lost Lane (Parallell)

With Jessica Sligter

- 2012: Fear And The Framing (Hubro)
- With 'Krachmacher'
- 2012: Paratrooper (Playdate Records)

With 'The Sweetest Thrill'

- 2012: Jewellery (Playdate Records)
- 2014: Strings & Timpani (Klangkollektivet)

With Erlend Apneseth

- 2013: Blikkspor (Heilo)

With 'Glow'

- 2013: Glow (Playdate Records)

With 'Augur Ensemble'

- 2013: The Daily Unknown (Bottom)

With 'Electric Eye'

- 2013: Pick-Up, Lift-Off, Space, Time (Klangkollektivet)
- 2016: Different Sun (Jansen Plateproduksjon)
- 2016: «Live at Blå» (Jansen Plateproduksjoner)
- 2017: «From The Poisonous Tree» (Jansen Plateproduksjoner)
- 2021: "Horizons" (Fuzz Club)

With 'The Big Almost'

- 2014: Mouth (Klangkollektivet)

With 'Building Instrument'

- 2014: Building Instrument (Hubro)
- 2016: Kem Som Kan Å Leve (Hubro)
- 2018: «Mangelen Min» (Hubro)

With 'Crab is Crap' feat. Ståle Storløkken

- 2015: Miradouro (Øyvind Jazzforum)

With Erlend Apneseth Trio

- 2016: Det Andre Rommet (Hubro)
- 2017: «Åra» (Hubro)
- 2019: «Salika, Molika» (Hubro)
- 2021: "Lokk" (Hubro)

With 'Strings & Timpani'

- 2016: Hyphen (Hubro)
- 2017: «Brak 20» w/Mari Kvien Brunvoll (EDDA Music)
- 2020: "Voice & Strings & Timpani" (Hubro)

With 'Fri Steel'

- 2021: "Fristil" (Eget Selskap)

With 'Wendra Hill'

- 2021: "Ungdomskilden" (Playdate Records)

With 'BERG'

- 2020: «Berg» (ANUK)

With 'Jacob Öhrvall'

- 2019: "Long Gone" (Killing Music)

With 'Fredrik William Olsen'

- 2017: «Kosmos og Kaos» (Grappa)

With 'Oliva/Abbuehl/Hegg-Lunde'

- 2017: «Princess» (Vision Fugitive)
