= Stephan Meidell =

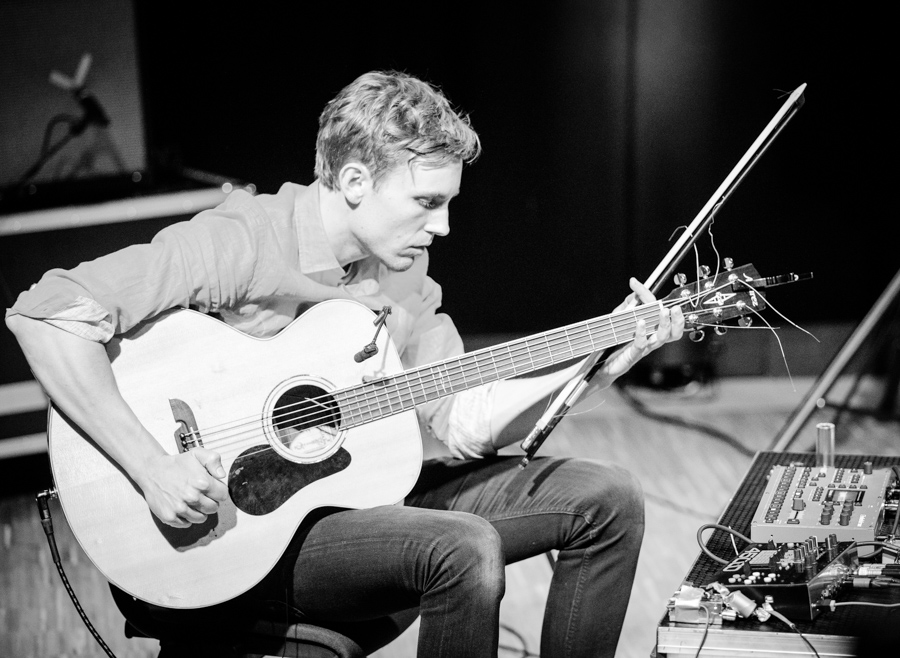
- Meidell at the 2018 Kongsberg Jazzfestival

Background information
- Born: 17 December 1982 (age 43); Kristiansand, Vest-Agder
- Origin: Norway
- Genres: Jazz, impro
- Occupations: Musician, composer
- Instrument: Guitar
- Website: stephanmeidell.com

Stephan Meidell (born 17 December 1982 in Kristiansand, Norway) is a Norwegian guitarist and composer living in Bergen.

== Biography ==
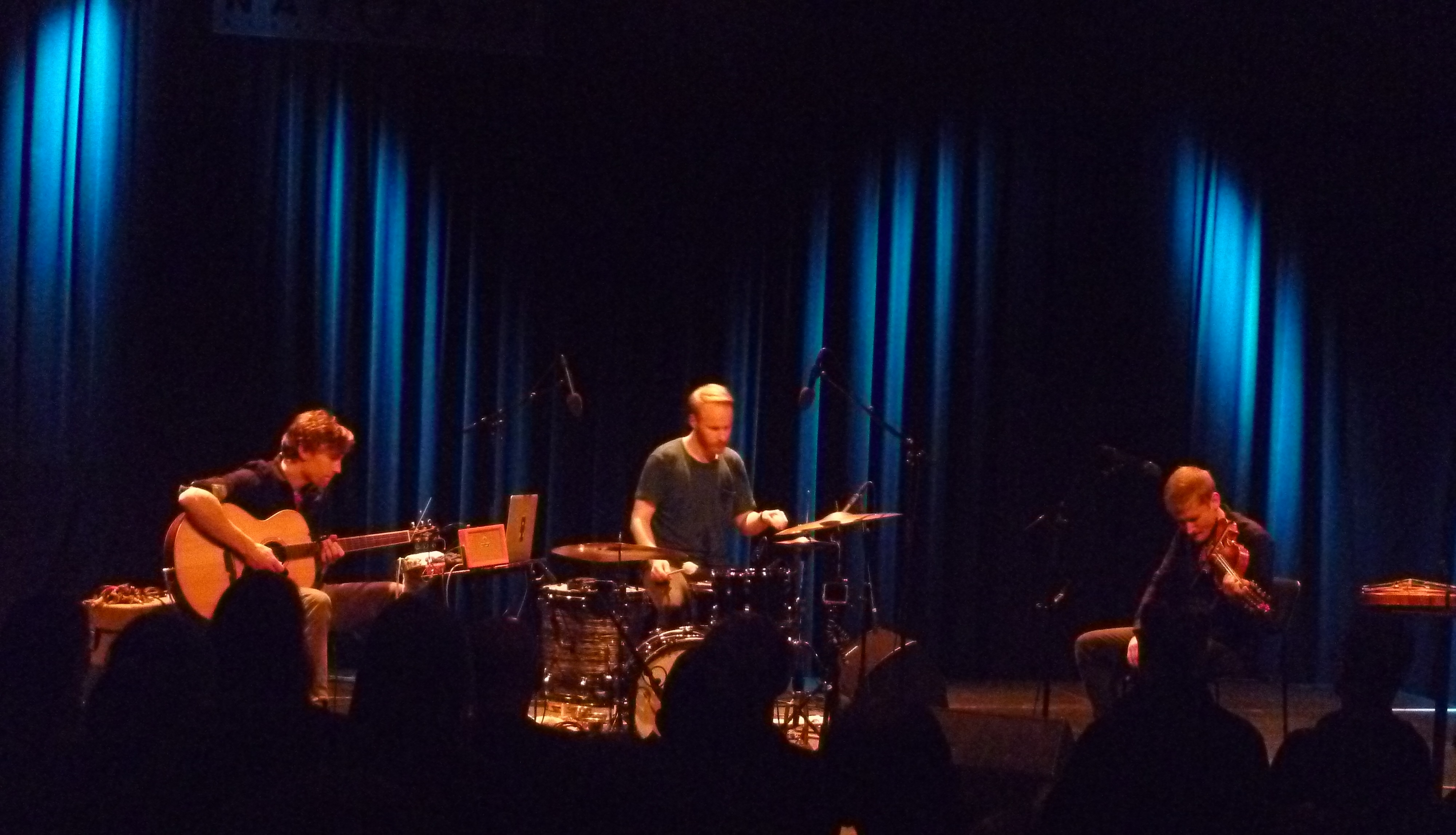
Meidell with Erlend Apneseth Trio at the 2016 Nattjazz in Bergen, Norway.

Meidell studied jazz at the Conservatorium van Amsterdam (2004-2008), and uses his background in jazz and improvised music within rock, pop music, noise and sound art in bands like Cakewalk, Krachmacher, Velkro, The Sweetest Thrill, and Vanilla Riot.

Meidell started the concert series Playdate in 2009 and has been chairman of Ny Musikk Bergen (New Music Bergen) in the period 2012-2014. He got brilliant reviews for his solo debut album Cascades (2014), and for his commissioned opening concert Voice & Strings & Timpani for the 2016 Nattjazz. In addition to co-composer Øyvind Hegg-Lunde, with musicians like Mari Kvien Brunvoll, Eva Pfitzenmaier, Kim Åge Furuhaug, and Stein Urheim. He is also a music critic for the Norwegian newspaper Bergens Tidende.

== Discography ==
=== Solo album ===
- 2014: Cascades (Hubro)
- 2017: Metrics (Hubro)

=== Collaborations ===
With 'Mr. Eart'

- 2007: Facts In The Case Of The Mysterious Pop Murders (Neuklang)

With 'Vanilla Riot'

- 2009: Stitch (AIM Sound City)¨
- 2012: Stretch (Playdate Records)¨

With 'Velkro'

- 2011: The Future Of The Past (Pling Music)
- 2014: Don't Wait For The Revolution (Clean Feed)
- 2017: Too Lazy To Panic (Clean Feed)

With 'Krachmacher'

- 2012: Paratrooper (Klangkollektivet)

With 'Cakewalk', trio including Ivar Loe Bjørnstad and Øystein Skar

- 2012: Wired (Hubro)
- 2013: Transfixed (Hubro)
- 2017: Ishihara (Hubro)

With 'The Sweetest Thrill'

- 2012: Jewellery (Playdate Records)
- 2014: Strings & Timpani (Klangkollektivet)

With Erlend Apneseth

- 2013: Blikkspor (Heilo)
- 2016: Det Andre Rommet (Hubro), with Erlend Apneseth Trio
- 2018: Åra (Hubro), with Erlend Apneseth Trio
- 2016: Salika, Molika (Hubro), with Erlend Apneseth Trio with Frode Haltli Frode Haltli

With 'Strings & Timpani'

- 2016: Hyphen (Hubro)
