= LabField =

Norwegian musical group

- Origin: Oslo, Norway
- Genres: Jazz, electronica, experimental
- Years active: 2007–present
- Labels: Hubro Music
- Members: David Stackenäs; Ingar Zach; Giuseppe Ielasi

LabField started as a Norwegian/Swedish duo and expanded to a trio for their 2015 album Bucket of Songs.

== Biography ==
LabField's musical objective is to create a condition that the listener apparently can experience as static, but upon closer listening contains layers of detail that is constantly changing. The sound in the room helps to reinforce the chaos of the produced sound and to make it difficult for the listener to localize sound sources to the various teams that sounds. Their debut album Fishforms (2007) and the follow-up Collab (2009) concentrated on a hypnotic drone landscape. One their third album, Bucket of Songs (2015), they became a trio and concentrated more on songs. Mariam Wallentin from Wildbirds & Peacdrums, Mariam the Believer, and Fire! Orchestra, contributes vocals on many of the tracks.

LabField consists of Swedish guitarist David Stackenäs, who has played with Territory Band, Seval, Fire! Orchestra, and Norwegian percussionist Ingar Zach, who has collaborated with Huntsville, Dans Les Arbres, Arve Henriksen, and Erik Honoré. Stackenäs and Zach played in the trio Tri-Dim with saxophonist Håkon Kornstad. When the trio broke up, they decided to form a duo and create a laboratory for trying experimental approaches to music. Giuseppe Ielasi from Italy joined the duo as guest on the album Collab, then became a member of the band. Ielasi has released several solo albums on the label 12K and has collaborated with Taku Sugimoto, Jerome Noetinger, Phill Niblock, and Oren Ambarchi. Ielasi also operates the label School Map.

== Band members ==
- David Stackenäs - guitar and electronics
- Ingar Zach - percussion and electronics
- Giuseppe Ielasi - guitar and electronics

== Discography ==
- 2007: Fishforms (Bottrop-Boy)
- 2009: Collab (Hubro Music)
- 2015: Bucket of Songs (Hubro Music)
