= Christian Skår Winther =

Norwegian guitarist (born 1989)

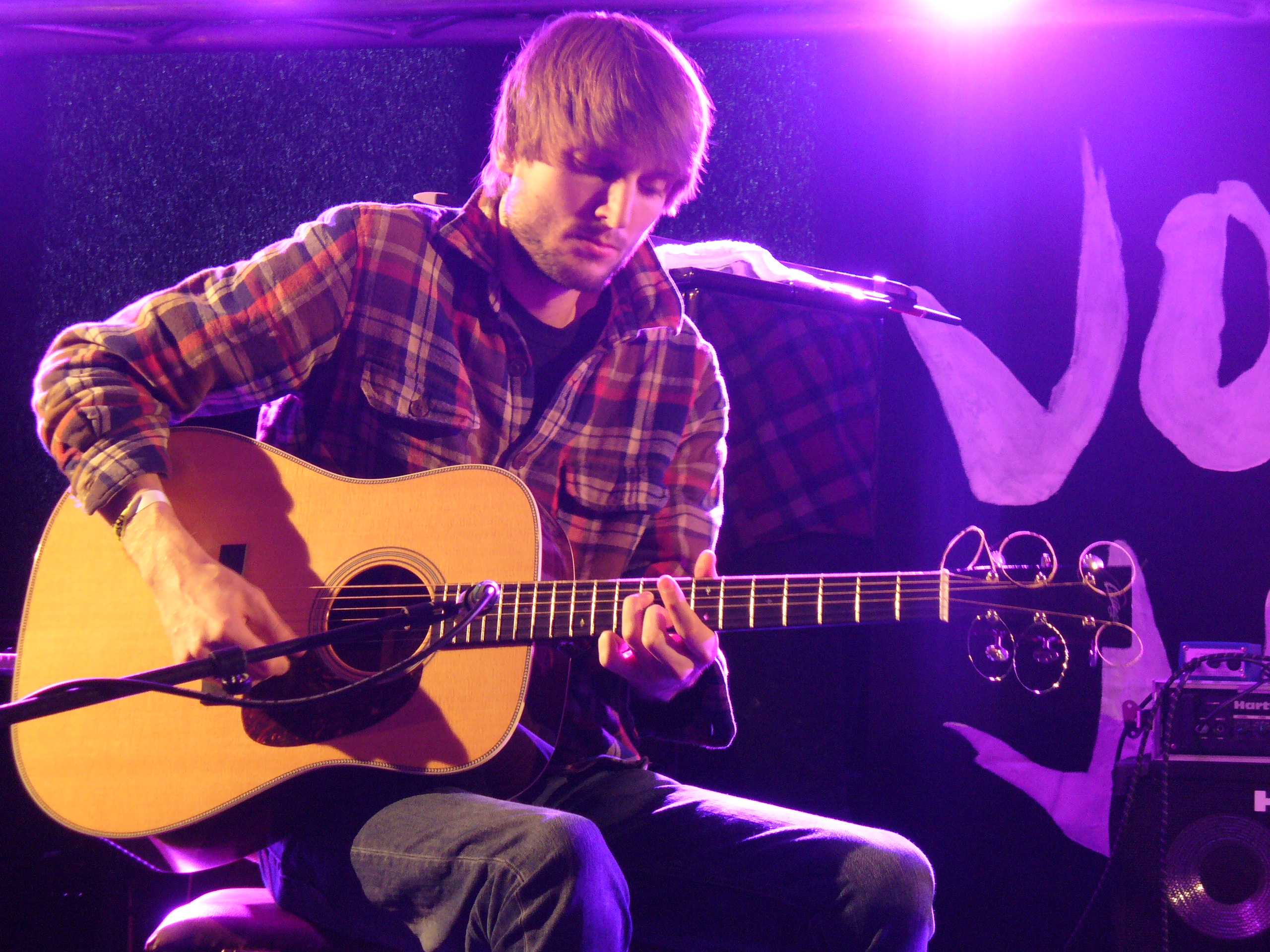
- Winther within Monkey Plot at Vossajazz 2014. (Photo by Knut Andersn)

Background information
- Born: 8 May 1989 (age 36); Ålesund, Møre og Romsdal
- Origin: Norway
- Genres: Alternative; Improvised music
- Occupations: Musician, composer
- Instruments: Guitar, Vocals
- Labels: Hubro; Earthly Habit; SusannaSonata; Jazzland; Va Fongool; Gigafon
- Formerly of: Monkey Plot
- Website: www.christianwinther.no

Christian Skår Winther (born 8 May 1989 in Ålesund, Norway) is a Norwegian musician (guitar) and the older brother of jazz drummer Andreas Skår Winther (b. 1991), known from bands like Monkey Plot, Listen to Girl, Ich Bin N!ntendo and Torg.

== Career ==
Christian Winther is a guitarist, songwriter, improviser, producer and singer. Best known from the improv- and instrumental rock group Monkey Plot, alternative pop duo Listen to Girl, noise punk band Ich Bin N!ntendo, and as a performer and co-producer in Torg. Winther have toured Europe, Japan and South America and released a dusin albums with his different projects. He also run the record label Earthly Habit.

He is educated from the Improvised Music and Jazz Department at the Norwegian Academy of Music with a Master Performance Degree, and in 2014 awarded "Young Jazz Musician of The Year" at Molde International Jazz Festival together with Monkey Plot.

Winther collaborated on the album release Ich Bin N!ntendo & Mats Gustafsson (2012) including Joakim Heibø Johansen (drums) and Magnus Skavhaug Nergaard (bass guitar), featuring Mats Olof Gustafsson (baritone saxophone). Monkey Plot, including Magnus Skavhaug Nergaard (double bass) and Jan Martin Gismervik (drums and percussion), made their debut with the album Løv Og Lette Vimpler (2013).

== Discography ==
=== In bands ===
Ich Bin N!ntendo

- 2012: Ich Bin N!ntendo & Mats Gustafsson (Va Fongool)
- 2014: Look (Va Fongool)
- 2016: Lykke (Shhpuma Records)

Monkey Plot

- 2013: Løv Og Lette Vimpler (Gigafon)
- 2015: Angående Omstendigheter Som Ikke Lar Seg Nedtegne (Hubro Music)
- 2016: Here I Sit, Knowing All Of This (Hubro)

Listen to Girl (formerly (Girl)

- 2016: Sea And Dirt (Vilje/SusannaSonata)

Torg

- 2018: Palms, Beaches, Dreams (Earthly Habit)
- 2015: Kost/Elak/Gnäll (Jazzland Recordings)

Karokh

- 2016: Needle, Thread and Nailpolish (No Forevers)
- 2014: Karokh (Loyal Label)

=== Other ===
- 2017: Trondheim Jazz Orchestra & Skrap - 'Antropocen' (Fanfare)
- 2013: Christian Winther / Christian Meaas Svendsen 'M / W' (Va Fongool)
