= Electric eye (disambiguation) =

Electric eye is an opto-electronic means of sensing. It may also refer to:

- Electric Eye (album), a 1984 album by Prodigal
- Electric Eye (video), a 2003 compilation DVD by Judas Priest
- Electric Eye (song), a 1982 song by Judas Priest
- Electric Eye (song), a 2017 song by Celldweller
- Electric Eye (band), a Psych-rock band from Norway
