= Jan Martin Gismervik =

Norwegian jazz drummer

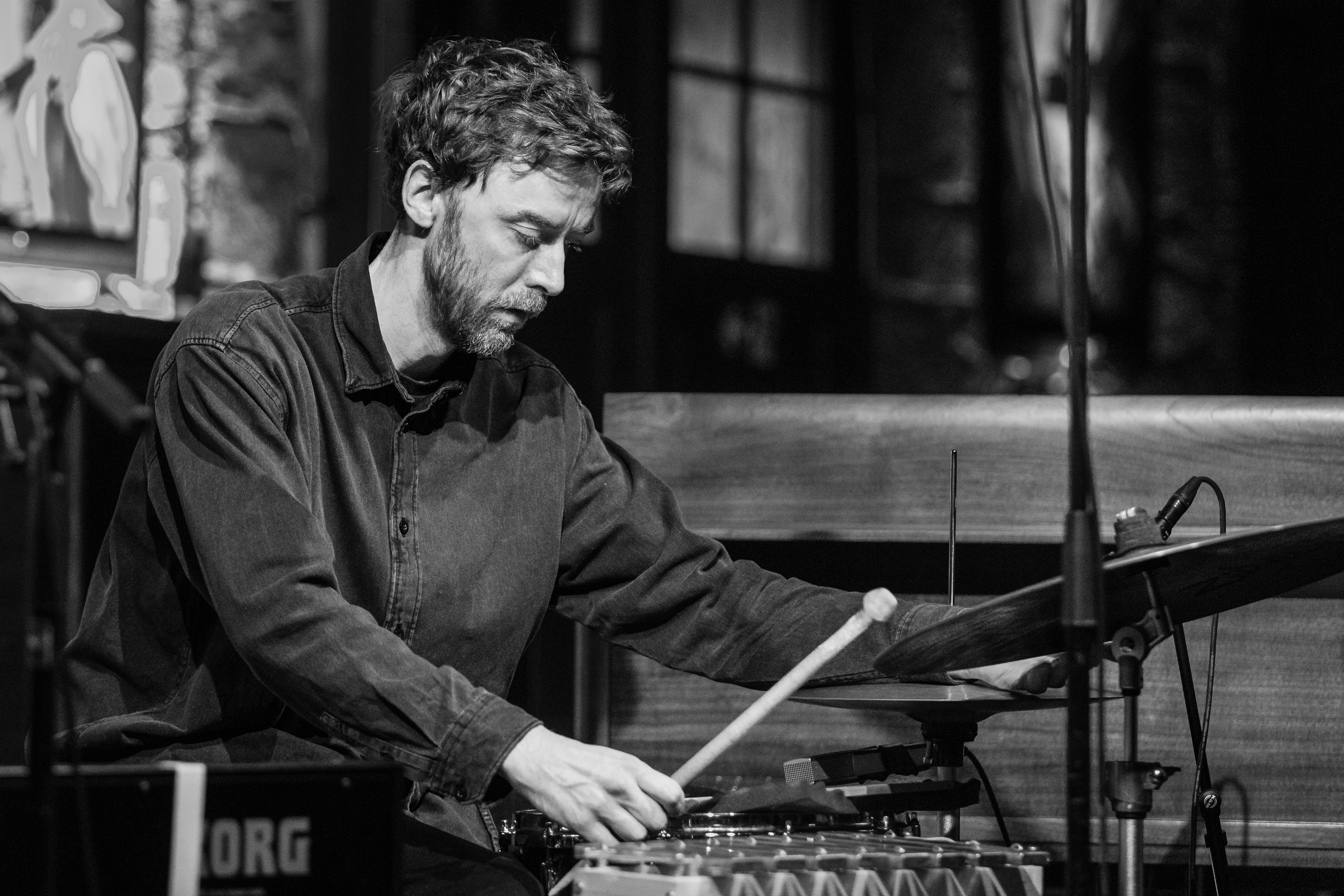
- Jan Martin Gismervik performing in Smeltehytta, Kongsberg 2025; Photo: Tore Sætre

Background information
- Born: 1988 (age 37–38); Avaldsnes, Rogaland
- Origin: Norway
- Genres: Jazz
- Occupations: Musician and composer
- Instrument: Drums
- Labels: Hubro; Earthly Habit; Clean Feed; Jazzland; Va Fongool; Gigafon; SOFA

Jan Martin Gismervik (born 1988 in Avaldsnes, Karmøy Municipality, Norway) is a Norwegian jazz musician (drums), known from bands like Monkey Plot, Torg, Oker, O, PGA.

== Career ==
Gismervik was raised in Avaldsnes, where he played in local groups. He is educated from the Improvised Music and Jazz Department at the Norwegian Academy of Music with a Bachelor Performance Degree, and in 2014 awarded "Young Jazz Musician of The Year" at Molde International Jazz Festival together with Monkey Plot. He cooperated within the duo "PGA" on the debut album Corrections (2012). On Corrections the "PGA" duo is assisted by Henrik Munkeby Nørstebø (trombone) and Torstein Lavik Larsen (trumpet) on two tracs. Monkey Plot, including Christian Skår Winther (guitar) and Magnus Skavhaug Nergaard (double bass), made their debut with the album Løv Og Lette Vimpler (2013).

== Honors ==
- 2014: Jazzintro award at Moldejazz, with Monkey Plot

== Discography ==
Within Wolfram

- 2012: Wolfram (Va Fongool)

Within PGA duo including Fredrik Luhr Dietrichson

- 2012: Corrections (Va Fongool)

Within Karokh

- 2014: Karokh (Loyal Label)
- 2016: Needle, Thread and Nailpolish (No Forevers)

Within Monkey Plot

- 2013: Løv Og Lette Vimpler (Gigafon)
- 2015: Angående Omstendigheter Som Ikke Lar Seg Nedtegne (Hubro Music)
- 2016: Here I Sit, Knowin All Of This (Hubro Music)
- 2016: Monkey Plot og Frode Gjerstad, FML Records (FML Records)

Within Platform

- 2015: Antroposcene (Va Fongool)
- 2017: FuxReFlux (Clean Feed)

Within Torg

- 2015: kost/elak/gneld (Jazzland)
- 2018: Palms, Beaches, Dreams (Earthly Habits)

Within Oker

- 2018: Husene Våre Er Museer (SOFA)
