= Anja Lauvdal =

Norwegian jazz musician and composer (born 1987)

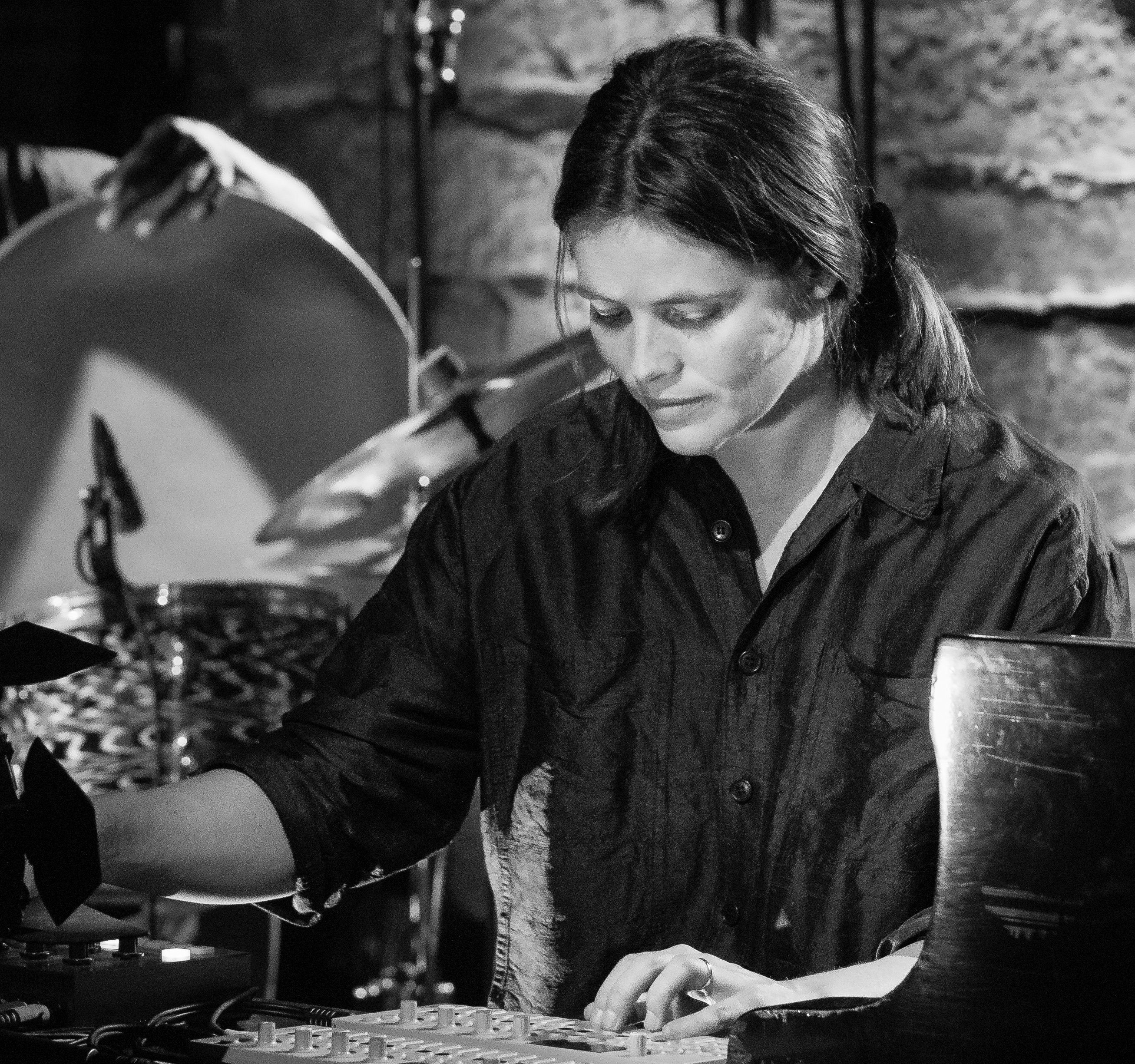
- Lauvdal at Kongsberg Jazzfestival 2022

Background information
- Born: 1987 (age 38–39); Flekkefjord, Vest-Agder, Norway
- Genres: Jazz
- Occupations: Musician, composer
- Instruments: Piano, keyboards
- Labels: Dayladore Collective, Hubro, Nabovarsel
- Website: www.myspace.com/anjaogheida

Anja Lauvdal (born 1987 in Flekkefjord, Norway) is a Norwegian jazz musician (piano, keyboards, electronics) and composer. She is known for her work with several Norwegian bands and for her solo releases.

== Career ==
Lauvdal studied music on the Jazz program at Trondheim Musikkonsevatorium, NTNU, where she joined the acoustic jazz band Moskus together with fellow students, Fredrik Luhr Dietrichson (double bass) from Haugesund and Hans Hulbækmo (drums) from Tolga. Their debut album was Salmesykkel (2012).

Her time as a student in Trondheim also led to several other collaborations. Lauvdal performed with Heiða Mobeck in Your Headlights Are On, which released a self-titled album in 2011. The two musicians later founded the ensemble Skadedyr. Lauvdal and Hulbækmo formed the duo Avalanche, which made its album debut with Whiteout in 2012. She also played piano in Oskar Yazan Mellemsether's band Ósk.

In 2011, Lauvdal received the Oslo Jazzfestival's Young Star scholarship, which she used to develop Skadedyr further. The ensemble released its debut album, Kongekrabbe, in 2013. Lauvdal also helped establish the band Broen, which released its debut album, Yoga, in 2015.

In addition to her work with her own groups, Lauvdal has performed in numerous other ensembles and collaborated with musicians including Jenny Hval, Susanna Wallumrød, Nils Bech and Erlend Apneseth. She has also composed and performed commissioned works and performed with the Trondheim Jazz Orchestra. In 2018, she was the musical director of the Oslo Jazzfestival's tribute concert to Joni Mitchell. In 2020, she was artist in residence at the Punktfestivalen, where she composed the commissioned work The School of Lost Borders.

Lauvdal was appointed an NTNU ambassador in 2020. The following year, she received the Kongsberg Jazzfestival's musician award, worth 200,000 Norwegian kroner. The jury highlighted, among other things, her work across musical genres and her initiative as a musician, composer and bandleader.

After more than a decade focusing primarily on ensembles and collaborations, Lauvdal released her first solo album, From a Story Now Lost, in 2022. The album was produced by Laurel Halo and released by Smalltown Supersound. She was nominated for Spellemannprisen in the open category for the album, while Moskus was nominated in the jazz category for Papirfuglen. In 2023, she received the Edvard Prize in the open category for From a Story Now Lost.

In 2026, Lauvdal was artist-in-residence at the Kristiansand Jazz Festival. She performed the commissioned work Etter Planter and presented the sound installation Det Myke Landskapet, gave a solo concert at Kristiansand Cathedral featuring lighting design by Silje Grimstad, and performed with the newly established Skagerrak Jazz Orchestra.

== Awards and honours ==
- 2011: Grappa's debut award, as a member of Moskus
- 2011: Statkraft Young Star scholarship
- 2015: Recipient of the SpareBank 1 JazZtipendiat award as a member of the duo Skrap with Heiða Mobeck
- 2020: Appointed an NTNU ambassador
- 2021: Recipient of the Kongsberg Jazz Festival's musician award
- 2023: Nominated for the Spellemannprisen in the open category for From a Story Now Lost
- 2023: Edvard Prize in the open category for From a Story Now Lost
- 2024: Nominated for the Spellemannprisen in the jazz category for Farewell to Faraway Friends (Wurlitzer Improvisations 2021–23)

== Discography ==
=== Solo albums ===
- 2022: From a Story Now Lost (Smalltown Supersound)
- 2023: Farewell to Faraway Friends (Wurlitzer Improvisations 2021–23) (Smalltown Supersound)

=== Broen ===
- 2013: Broen/Invader Ace: The split jump drug EP (10" EP) (Kakao Musikk)
- 2015: Yoga' (LP) (Nabovarsel)
- 2017: I <3 Art (Su Tissue)

=== Within Your Headlights Are On ===
- 2011: Your Headlights Are On (Dayladore Collective)

=== Within Moskus ===
- 2012: Salmesykkel (Hubro)
- 2014: Mestertyven (Hubro)
- 2016: Ulv Ulv (Hubro)
- 2018: Mirakler (Hubro)

=== Within Snøskred (Avalanche) ===
- 2012: Whiteout (Riot Factory)

=== Within Skadedyr ===
- 2013: Kongekrabbe (Hubro)
- 2016: Culturen (Hubro)
- 2018: Musikk! (Hubro)
