= Ingar Zach =

Norwegian percussionist (born 1971)

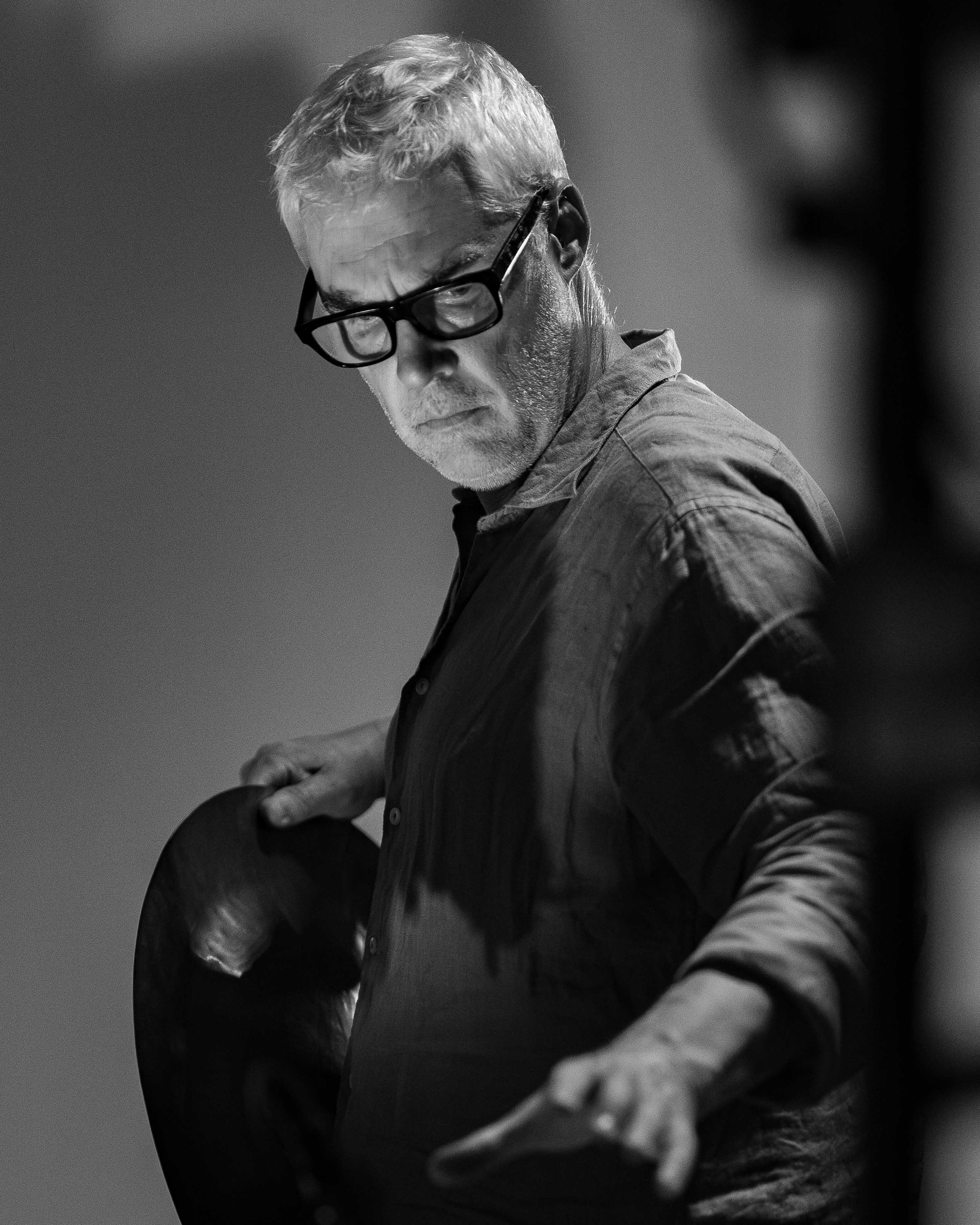
- Ingar Zach at Punktfestivalen 2025

Background information
- Born: 29 June 1971 (age 54); Oslo
- Origin: Norway
- Genres: Jazz
- Occupations: Musician, composer
- Instrument: Drums
- Labels: Sofa Records
- Website: ingarzach.com

Ingar Zach (born 29 June 1971 in Oslo, Norway) is a Norwegian percussionist and businessman, known from several recordings.

== Career ==
In the 1990s, Zach played within Chateau Neuf Spelemannslag and 'Harnihomba', while studying music at the University of Oslo (1993) and composition on Jazz program at Trondheim Musikkonsevatorium (1994–97). Within the trio 'Tri-Dim' (1997–2000) he released two albums together with Håkon Kornstad (saxophone) and David Stackenäs (guitar). With the steel guitarist Ivar Grydeland he established the record label Sofa, releasing improvisational music (2000), a collaboration that led to a master's degree in improvisation (2004) and the trio Huntsville including with Tonny Kluften (five albums, 2013).

Zach also collaborated in a duo with free jazz guitarist Derek Bailey (1930–2005), the Norwegian ditto Anders Hana, within the Norwegian trio 'No Spaghetti Edition' (four releases), and in the two orchestras Batagraf and Magnetic North Orchestra led by Jon Balke. In addition, he has played on releases by Karl Seglem and Carl Petter Opsahl. He lives in Madrid (2004), from which he runs the record label Sillòn of solo albums (subsidiary of Sofa, which is now headed by Grydeland).

== Discography ==
=== Solo albums ===
Within 'Mural' including Kim Myhr and Jim Denley

- 2010: Nectars of Emergence (Sofa Records)
- 2011: Live at the Rothko Chapel (Rothko Chapel Productions)

=== Collaborations ===
Duo with Ivar Grydeland

- 2000: Visiting Ants (Sofa Records)
- 2004: You Should Have Seen Me Before We First Met (Sofa Records)
- 2011: Lady Lord (Sofa Records), live as Emo Albino at Kongsberg Jazzfestival

Duo with Derek Bailey

- 2000: Ilaer (Sofa), live at the Concert Stage Blå

Within No Spaghetti Edition

- 2001: Listen... And Tell Me What It Was (Sofa Records)
- 2002: Pasta Variations (Sofa Records)
- 2003: Real Time Satellite Data (Sofa Records)
- 2006: Sketches of a Fusion (Sofa Records), featuring Christian Wallumrød

With Philipp Wachsmann, Charlotte Hug and Ivar Grydeland

- 2002: Wazahugy (Sofa Records)

Within HISS including with Tonny Kluften, Pat Thomas and Ivar Grydeland

- 2003: Zahir (Rossbin Records)

With Jaap Blonk and Ivar Grydeland

- 2004: Improvisors (Kontrans Records)

As Ivar Grydeland/Thomas Lehn/Ingar Zach trio

- 2006: Szc Zcz Cze Zec Eci Cin (Musica Genera)

Within Huntsville trio including with Ivar Grydeland and Tonny Kluften

- 2006: For The Middle Class (Rune Grammofon)
- 2008: Eco, Arches & Eras (Rune Grammofon)
- 2011: For Flowers, Cars And Merry Wars (Hubro Music)
- 2011: Splashgirl/Huntsville (Hubro Music), together with Splashgirl
- 2013: Past Increasing, Future Receding (Hubro Records)

Within Dans Les Arbres including with Ivar Grydeland, Xavier Charles and Christian Wallumrød

- 2008: Dans Les Arbres (ECM Records)
- 2012: Canopée (ECM Records)

LabField

- 2008: Fishforms (Bottrop-Boy)
- 2010: Collab (Hubro Music)
- 2014: Bucket Of Song (list of Hubro albums|Hubro Music)

With Arve Henriksen

- 2013: Places of Worship (Rune Grammofon)
