= Carl Petter Opsahl =

Norwegian priest, musician and journalist

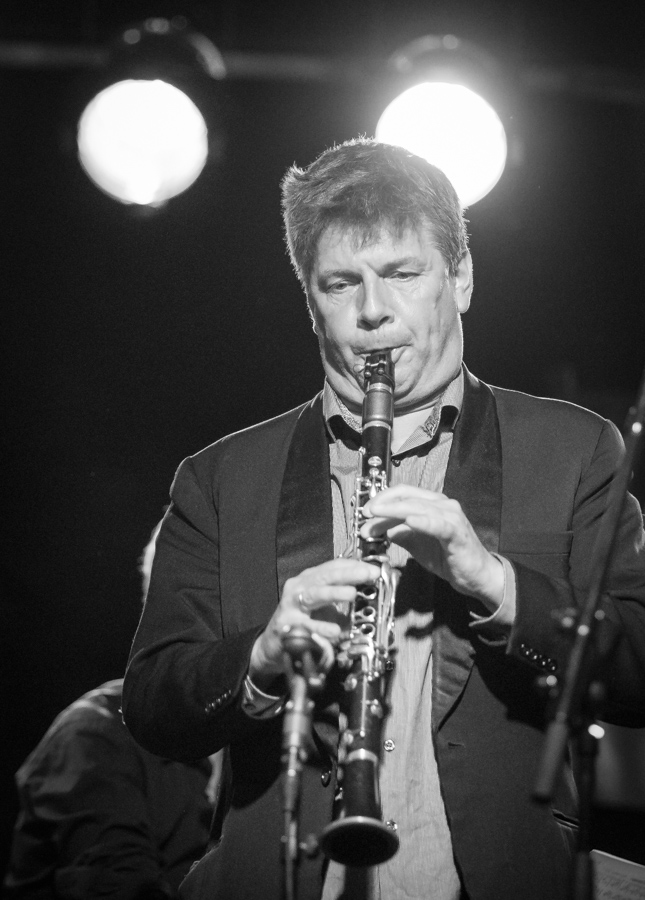
- Carl Petter Opsahl performing in 2017

Background information
- Born: 31 May 1964 (age 62); Oslo
- Origin: Norway
- Genre: Jazz
- Occupations: Musician, band leader, composer
- Instrument: Saxophone
- Website: carlpetter.no

Carl Petter Opsahl (born 31 May 1964 in Oslo, Norway) is a Norwegian priest, jazz musician, and journalist.

== Career ==
Opsahl was involved in the establishment of Caledonia Jazzband (1982) and toured in New Orleans (1983), where he settled and played in the All Star Brass Band (1986). Later he established the Chateau Neuf Spelemannslag (1992–2002) and Soulfood (formerly Creole Quartet), together with Christian Frank (bass), Bjørn Olufsen (drums) and Wollert Krohn-Hansen (piano).

He released his debut solo album Indigodalen (2001) with self-composed traditional folk music where he collaborated with Tord Gustavsen, Åsmund Reistad, Ingar Zach and Eline Monrad Vistven. It was followed by Improvisions containing melodic free jazz recorded at the 'Sister Churches' in Gran (2005). In 2008 he released the album Love, the Blues together with Tord Gustavsen and the drummer Jon Christensen.

Opsahl was central to the support measures for the city of New Orleans after Hurricane Katrina (2005). Han er til daglig gateprest i Kirkens Bymisjon, samt jazzanmelder for Verdens Gang and received Molderosen for this work. He has taught jazz history at the University of Oslo. He wrote the textbook En fortelling om jazz (A tale of jazz, 'Unipub' 2001), and is editor of the book En god dag. Fortellinger til inspirasjon og ettertanke (A good day. Stories of inspiration and reflection, 'JM Stenersens Forlag' 2009). He earned a Doctor's degree in theology 2012, with a thesis on spirituality and hip hop culture, "Dance to My Ministry: Exploring Hiphop Spirituality." In 2002–03 he was a visiting scholar at Union Theological Seminary.

Opsahl wrote the melody of the hymn "Bortom tid og rom og tanke".

== Discography (in selection) ==
=== Solo albums ===
- 2001: Indigodalen (Heilo)
- 2005: Improvisions (Park Grammofon)
- 2008: Love, The Blues (Park Grammofon)

=== Collaborations ===
With Caledonia Jazzband

- 1987: Walkin' (Hot Club Records), feat. Wendell Brunious
- 2001: When The Saints (Hot Club Records), feat. Geoff Bull
- 2009: Street People (Hot Club Records)

With Chateau Neuf Spelemannslag

- 1995: Spell (Heilo)
- 1997: Tjuvgods (Grappa Music)
- 2001: Curing Norwegian Stiffness (Heilo)

With Zotora

- 1998: Emigrate (Circular Recordings), on "Sargasso"
