= Monkey Plot =

Norwegian jazz band

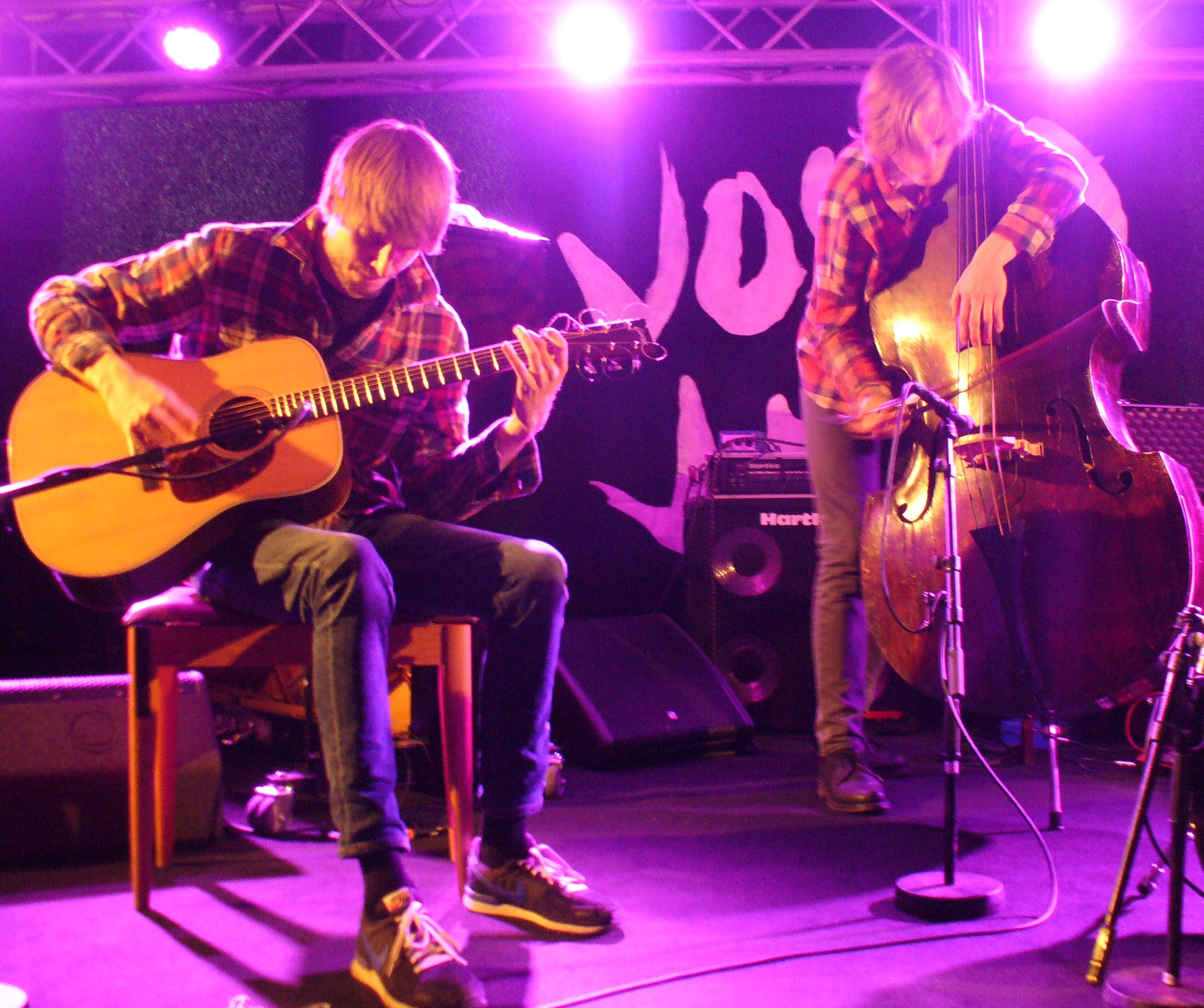
- Monkey Plot 2014 at Vossajazz 2014.

Background information
- Origin: Norway
- Genres: Jazz
- Years active: 2011–present
- Labels: Hubro, Gigafon
- Members: Christian Skår Winther; Magnus Skavhaug Nergaard; Jan Martin Gismervik
- Website: www.monkeyplot.com

Monkey Plot (initiated in 2011) is a Norwegian jazz trio playing acoustic improvised music with their own touch.

== Biography ==
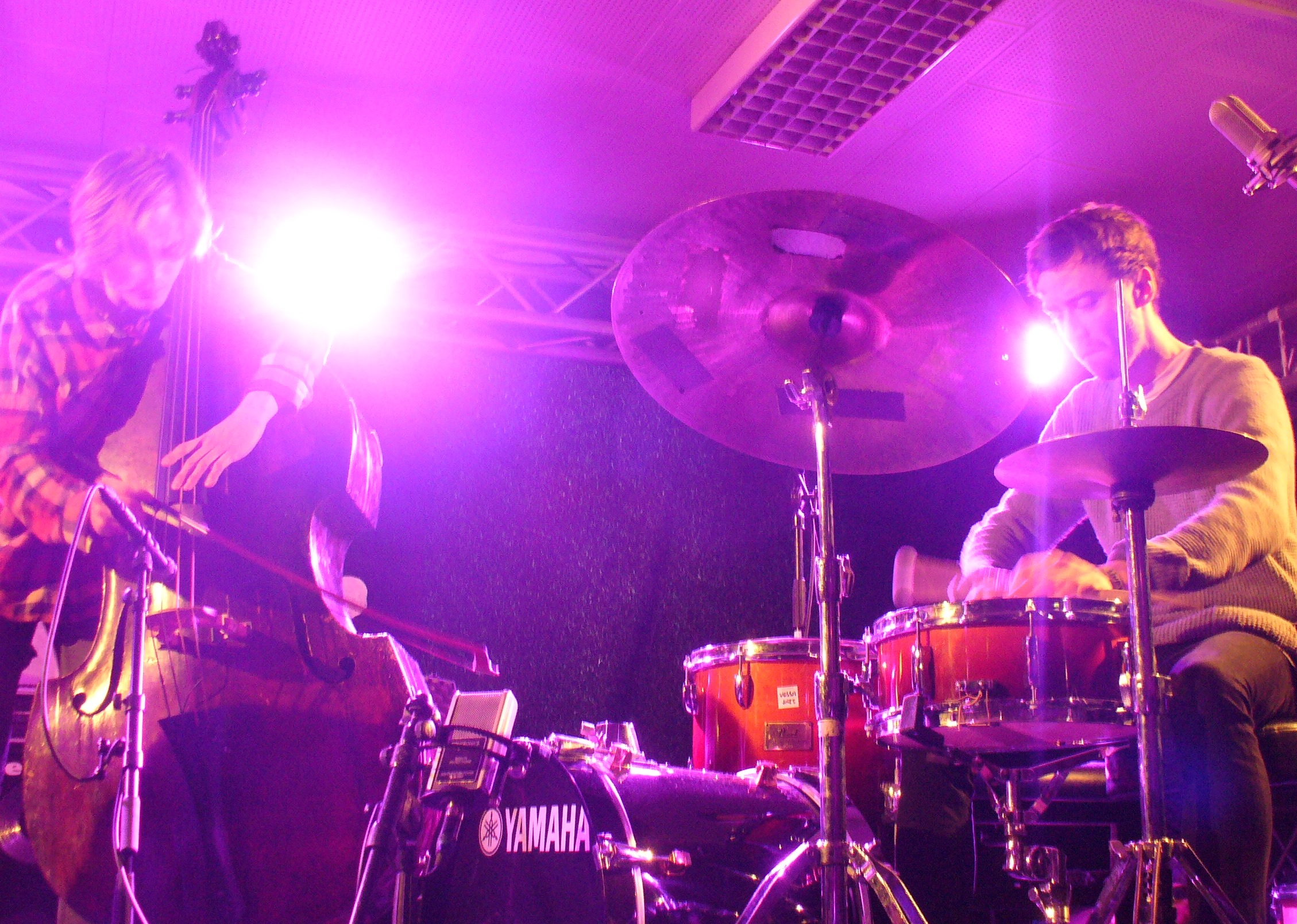
Monkey Plot at Vossajazz 2014.

After four years of study at the Norwegian Academy of Music, the trio released their debut album Løv Og Lette Vimpler in 2013. The album was recorded in Stavanger, in the studio of Norwegian free jazz pioneer Frode Gjerstad.

== Band members ==
- Christian Skår Winther – acoustic guitar
- Magnus Skavhaug Nergaard – upright bass
- Jan Martin Gismervik – drums and percussion

== Honors ==
- 2014: Jazzintro award at Moldejazz

== Discography ==
- 2013: Løv Og Lette Vimpler (Gigafon Records)
- 2015: Angående Omstendigheter Som Ikke Lar Seg Nedtegne (Hubro)
- 2016: Here I Sit, Knowing All Of This (Hubro)
