= Philip Schjetlein =

Norwegian musician (born 1986)

- Born: Philip Andre Schjetlein; 12 January 1986 (age 39); Oslo
- Origin: Norway
- Genres: Jazz
- Occupation(s): Musician, composer
- Instrument: Guitar
- Website: Philip Schjetlein on Myspace

Philip Schjetlein (born 12 January 1986) is a Norwegian jazz musician (guitar), known from self-titled bands like P. S. Quartet/Trio.

== Career ==
Schjetlein studied music on the Jazz program at Trondheim Musikkonsevatorium, NTNU (2009). Together with fellow students he initiated his own Philip Schjetlein Quartet/Trio, including Adrian Waade (violin, not in the trio), Fredrik Luhr Dietrichson (double bass) and Hans Hulbækmo (drums), performing with Studio Sokrates and program host Knut Borge, philosopher Elin Svenneby, and program host Lars Nilsen NRK. Together with Wade he also collaborates in the quartet Wade/Schjetlein/Sundland/Nørstebø.
