= Mari Kvien Brunvoll (album) =

Live album by Mari Kvien Brunvoll
- Released: 2012
- Recorded: Stavanger, Amsterdam; Italy
- Genre: Electronica, folk, jazz
- Length: 44:43
- Label: Jazzland

Mari Kvien Brunvoll (released 2012 by Jazzland Recordings – 371 627-8) is the debut album of the Norwegian singer Mari Kvien Brunvoll, recorded February 2010 at the "12 Points Festival", Stavanger, Norway by Per Ravnaas and Kaj Hjertenes at NRK Musikkteknikk. "Is It Love" and "Joanna" was recorded July 2010, at Clusone Jazz Festival, Italy. "Oh How Much" was recorded November 2009, at the Bimhuis in Amsterdam, Netherlands, by Marc Broer and Willem Feenstra of NTR Radio. All music performed live in concert by Mari Kvien Brunvoll.

== Personnel ==
- Mari Kvien Brunvoll – voice, live sampling, electronics, kalimba, zither, percussion

== Track listing ==
1. «Sweet Mysterious» (7:08)
2. «Everywhere You Go» (7:38)
3. «I'm Going, Don't You Know» (2:49)
4. «Wake Up» (5:33)
5. «Is It Love» (6:08)
6. «Joanna» (4:20)
7. «Oh How Much» (4:19)
8. «Something Inside» (6:48)

== Credits ==
- Design – Elida Brenna Linge
- Mastered at Lunds Lyd by – Morten Lund
- Mixed at Studio 5071 by – Morten Skage
- Photography (Live) by – Oliver Heisch
- Recorded by – Kai Hjertenes (tracks: 1–4, 8), Marc Broer (tracks: 7), Per Ravnaas (tracks: 1–4, 8), Willem Feenstra (tracks: 7)
- Photography, Design & Written by – Mari Kvien Brunvoll
- Written by – Memphis Minnie (tracks: 2–3)
