= Fredrik Luhr Dietrichson =

Norwegian upright bassist

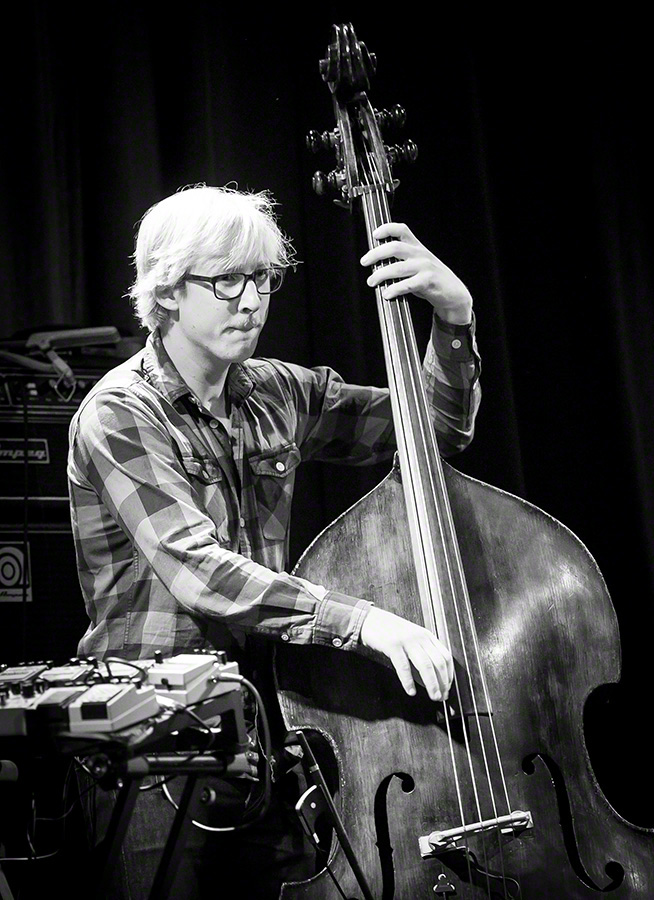
- Luhr Dietrichson at Oslo Jazzfestival 2016.

Background information
- Born: 5 February 1988 (age 38); Haugesund, Rogaland
- Origin: Norway
- Genre: Jazz
- Occupations: Musician, composer
- Instrument: Upright bass
- Website: Fredrik Luhr Dietrichson on Myspace

Fredrik Luhr Dietrichson (born 5 February 1988 in Haugesund, Norway) is a Norwegian Upright bassist.

== Career ==
Dietrichson holds a Bachelor's degree in Music Performance by the Jazz program at Trondheim Musikkonsevatorium, where he and some fellow students started the trio "Moskus" including Anja Lauvdal (piano) & Hans Hulbækmo (drums). They won the debutant award by the label Grappa (2011), and was a finalist in this year "JazzIntro". The three young musicians from Haugesund, Flekkefjord, and Tolga, Norway also made positively noted in other constellations than the trio, as it has been linked to significant anticipation debut album Salmesykkel (2012), which was launched with a concert at the National Jazz scene, "Victoria" in Oslo. "Moskus" is a picture rich and popular melody and rhythm, circling around phrases and figures rather than more complete compositions and emphasis on sound and chords rather than improvised single note lines with complete closer, and is closer to pop / rock tracks of The Bad Plus and Esbjörn Svensson Trio than more orthodox jazztrioers. Some gospel moods may point towards Tord Gustavsen Trio.

Dietrichson has also been involved the establishment of the bands "Shotgun", "Maren Trio", Philip Schjetlein Trio, the trio "Wolfram" with the self-titled debut album Wolfram (2012) and the duo "PGA" with the debut album Corrections (2012). On Corrections the "PGA" duo is assisted by Henrik Munkeby Nørstebø (trombone) and Thorsten Lavik Larsen (trumpet) on two tracs.

== Honors ==
- 2010: Sildajazzprisen
- 2011: The label Grappa debutant award, within "Moscus"

== Discography ==
Within Wolfram Trio including Halvor Meling (saxophone) & Jan Martin Gismervik (drums)

- 2012: Wolfram (Va Fongool)

Within PGA duo including Jan Martin Gismervik (drums)

- 2012: Corrections (Va Fongool)

Within Moskus Trio including Anja Lauvdal (piano) & Hans Hulbækmo (drums)

- 2012: Salmesykkel (Hubro)
- 2014: Mestertyven (Hubro)
- 2016: Ulv Ulv (Hubro)

Within Skadedyr

- 2013: Kongekrabbe (Hubro)
- 2016: Culturen (Hubro)

Awards
Preceded by Sigurd Ulveseth	Recipient of the Sildajazzprisen; 2010	Succeeded by Marius Neset
