= Huntsville (Norwegian band) =

Norwegian experimental jazz trio

- Origin: Trondheim, Norway
- Genres: Jazz; Electronica; Experimental rock
- Years active: 2006–present
- Labels: Rune Grammofon; Hubro Music
- Members: Ivar Grydeland; Ingar Zach; Tonny Kluften
- Website: www.huntsville.no

Huntsville (established 2006 in Oslo, Norway) is an experimental jazz trio.

== Biography ==
Huntsville was formed by three Norwegian veterans of creative jazz music, the guitarist Ivar Grydeland, bassist Tonny Klutten and percussionist Ingar Zach. They perform their instruments in unorthodox manners and then manipulated their sounds to obtain the post-modern reinvention of folk, jazz, raga and drone music for their debut album For The Middle Class ( 2006). Here we may note the 15 minute tune "The Appearance Of A Wise Child" and the 22 minute tune "Add A Key Of Humanity". Their music is described as energetic and intense, and they have played a variety of concerts internationally and in Norway.

== Band members ==
- Ivar Grydeland – guitars, banjo, pedal steel guitar and various instruments
- Ingar Zach – percussion, tabla machine, sarangi box, sruti box, drone commander and various instruments
- Tonny Kluften – electric bass, double bass, bass pedals and various instruments

== Discography ==
- 2006: For The Middle Class (Rune Grammofon)
- 2008: Eco, Arches & Eras (Rune Grammofon)
- 2011: For Flowers, Cars And Merry Wars (Hubro Music)
- 2011: Splashgirl / Huntsville (Hubro Music), with Splashgirl
- 2013: Past Increasing, Future Receding (Hubro Music)
- 2015: Pond (Hubro Music)
- 2020: Bow Shoulder (Hubro Music)
