= Magnus Skavhaug Nergaard =

Norwegian jazz musician

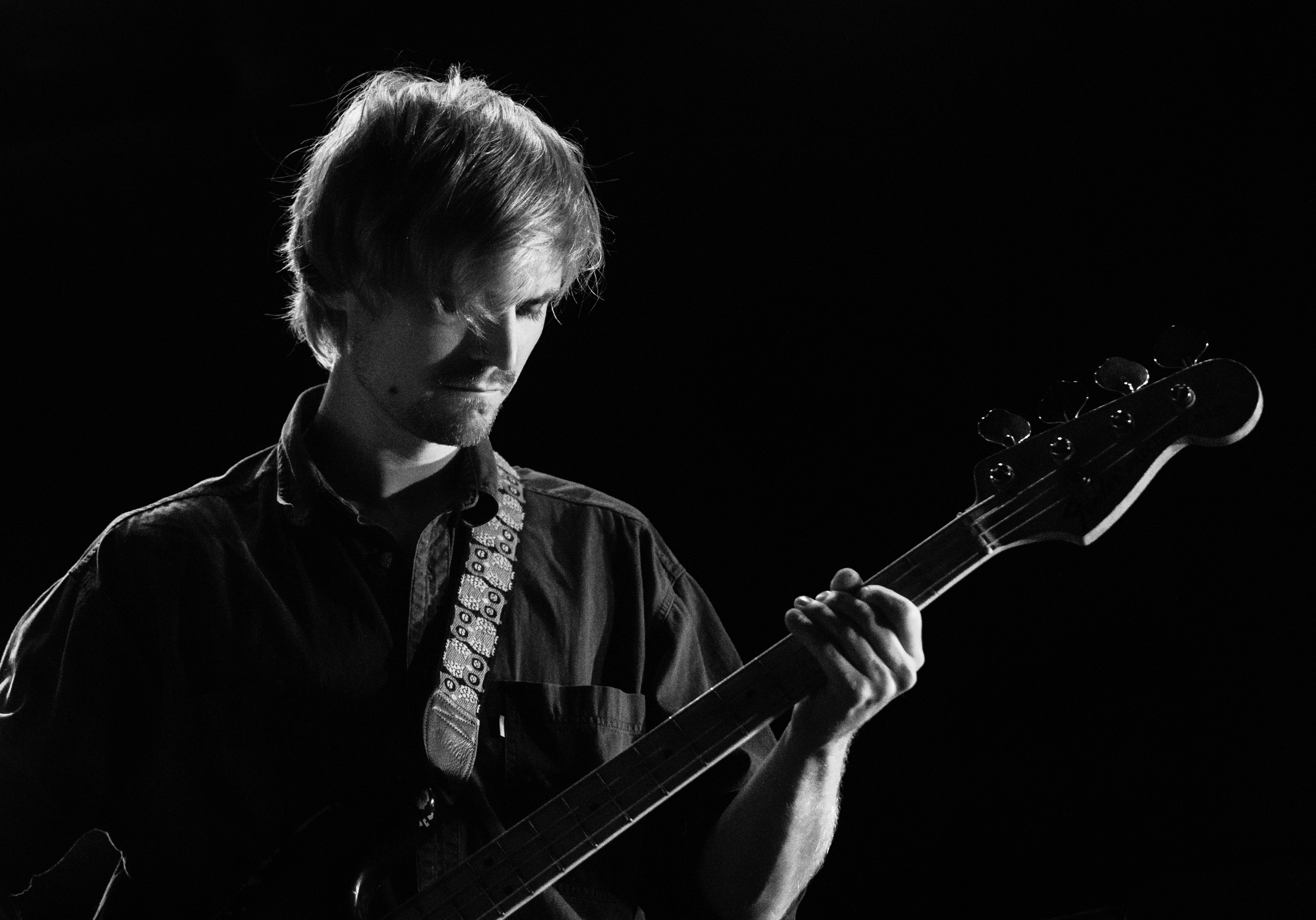
- Magnus Nergaard performing at Blå, Oslo 2023; Photo: Tore Sætre

Background information
- Born: 20 November 1989 (age 36); Tranby, Buskerud
- Origin: Norway
- Genres: Jazz
- Occupations: Musician, composer
- Instruments: Upright bass, bass guitar
- Website: www.magnusnergaard.wordpress.com

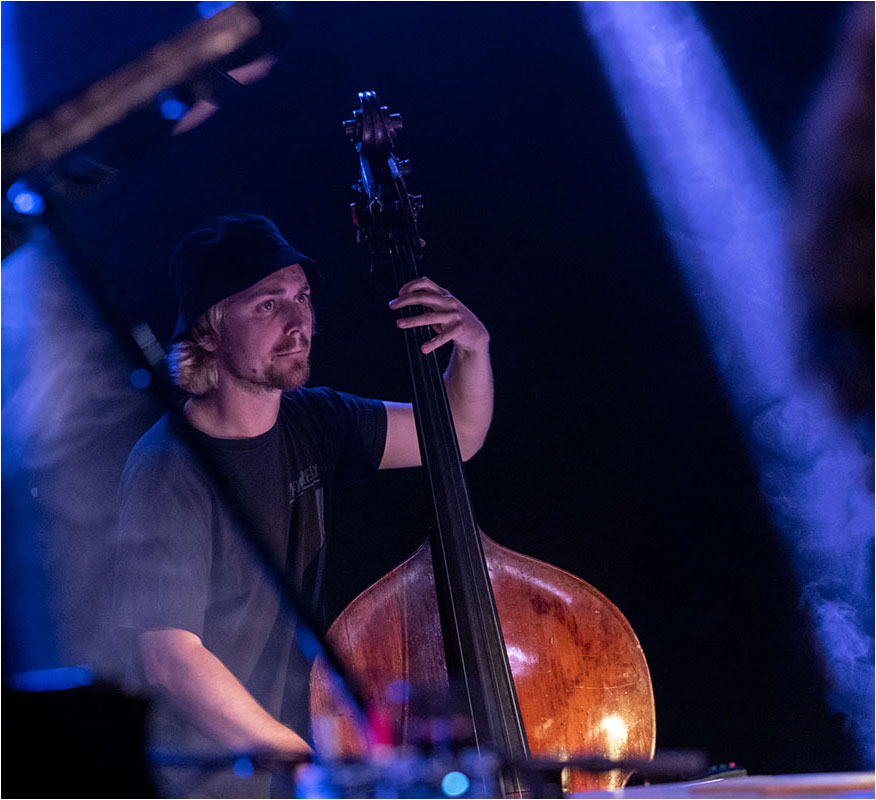
Aarhus Jazz Festival 2022 Photo Hreinn Gudlaugsson

Magnus Skavhaug Nergaard (born 20 November 1989 in Tranby, Norway) is a Norwegian Jazz musician (upright bass & bass guitar), known from bands like Monkey Plot, Mummu, Ronja and Ich Bin N!ntendo.

== Career ==
Nergaard is a graduate of the Department of improvisation and jazz at Norwegian Academy of Music in Oslo (2013). His musical genres span over musical landscapes from improvised music, to rock and noise, often influenced by different kinds of world folk-music, and always trying out new approaches to create exciting new combinations.

Nergaard collaborated on the album release Ich Bin N!ntendo & Mats Gustafsson (2012) including Joakim Heibø Johansen (drums) and Christian Skår Winther (guitar), featuring Mats Olof Gustafsson (baritone saxophone). Within the trio Monkey Plot including Christian Skår Winther (guitar) and Jan Martin Gismervik (drums and percussion), he released the latest album Løv Og Lette Vimpler (2013).

Mummu is a new Norwegian musical band comprised from the female duo Skrap including Anja Lauvdal (Korg MS10), Heida Karine Johannesdottir Mobeck (tuba), and the male trio Ich Bin N!ntendo, including Christian Skår Winther (guitar) and Joakim Heibø Johansen (drums).

== Discography ==
Within Ich Bin N!ntendo

- 2012: Ich Bin N!ntendo & Mats Gustafsson (Va Fongool)
- 2014: "Look" (Va Fongool)

Within Karokh

- 2013: "Karokh" (Loyal Label)

Within Mummu

- 2013: Mitt Ferieparadis (Va Fangool)

Within Monkey Plot

- 2013: Løv Og Lette Vimpler (Gigafon)
- 2015: Angående omstendigheter som ikke lar seg nedtegne (Hubro)

Within Ronja

- 2013: Il Calebrone (Havtorn Records)
