= Kim Myhr =

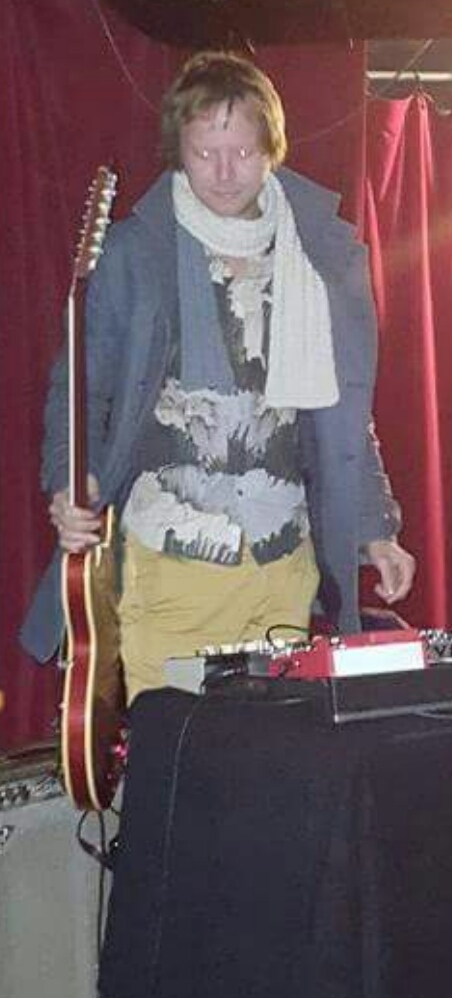

Background information
- Born: 17 December 1981 (age 44); Trondheim, Norway
- Genre: Experimental music
- Occupation: Musician
- Instrument: Guitar
- Labels: Sofa, Audition
- Website: www.kimmyhr.com

Kim Myhr (born 17 December 1981 in Trondheim, Norway) is a Norwegian guitarist and composer in the field of experimental music.

== Career ==
Kim Myhr (born 1981) is an active voice of the creative music scene in Norway, both as a composer and as a guitarist, with frequent performances throughout Europe, Australia, Asia and North- as well as South-America.

As a composer, Myhr wrote "stems and cages" for the Trondheim Jazz Orchestra in 2009, a large ensemble including Sidsel Endresen, Christian Wallumrød, Jim Denley among others. The music was released on the CD "stems and cages" in 2010. Kim wrote a second piece for the orchestra for the 2012 Ultima festival called "In the end his voice will be the sound of paper", this time featuring the voice of Jenny Hval. Myhr works frequently with dance, notably writing music for productions by Italian choreographer Francesco Scavetta, and in 2014 a new collaboration with dancer Orfee Schuijt.

Myhr's first solo record "All your limbs singing" was released March 2014. His solo music explores the acoustic possibilities of the 12-string guitar, and can remind the listener of early music of Ligeti and of Morton Feldman, but it also contains an energy and simplicity similar to American folk music.

Myhr is also one third of MURAL, a trio with Australian wind player Jim Denley and percussionist Ingar Zach. They have worked together since 2007, and have released two CDs; Nectars of Emergence (2010) and "Live at the Rothko Chapel" (2011). The latter is a documentation of a continuing relationship with the Rothko Chapel in Houston.

== Honors ==
- 2008: JazZtipend at the Moldejazz

== Discography ==
=== Solo ===
- 2016: Bloom (Hubro)
- 2017: You I Me (Hubro)

With Burkhard Beins, Kari Rønnekleiv and Nils Ostendorf

- 2011: Live at Ringve Museum Trondheim 2011 (Audition)
- 2014: All Your Limbs Singing (Sofa)

With Trondheim Jazz Orchestra featuring Jenny Hval

- 2016: In The End His Voice Will Be The Sound Of Paper (Hubro)

=== Collaborations ===
Within 'Spin Ensemble' including Nils Ostendorf, Philippe Lauzier, Martin Taxt and Toma Gouband

- 2005: Spin Ensemble (Spin)

With Philippe Lauzier, Pierre-Yves Martel and Martin Tétreault

- 2008: Disparation De L'Usine Éphémere (Ambiances Magnétiques)

With Jim Denley

- 2009: Systems Realignment (either/OAR)

With Jim Denley, Philippe Lauzier, Pierre-Yves Martel and Éric Normand

- 2010: Transition De Phase (Tour De Bras)

With Trondheim Jazz Orchestra

- 2010: Stems And Cages (MNJ)

Within 'Mural' including Ingar Zach and Jim Denley

- 2010: Nectars of Emergence (Sofa)
- 2011: Live at the Rothko Chapel (Rothko Chapel Productions)

Within 'Silencers' including Toma Gouband, Benoît Delbecq and Nils Ostendorf

- 2011: Balance Des Blancs (Sofa)

Within 'Muringa' including Klaus Ellerhusen Holm, Tor Haugerud & Martin Taxt

- 2012: The Unknown Knowns (Sofa)
