= Mari Kvien Brunvoll =

Norwegian folk and jazz singer

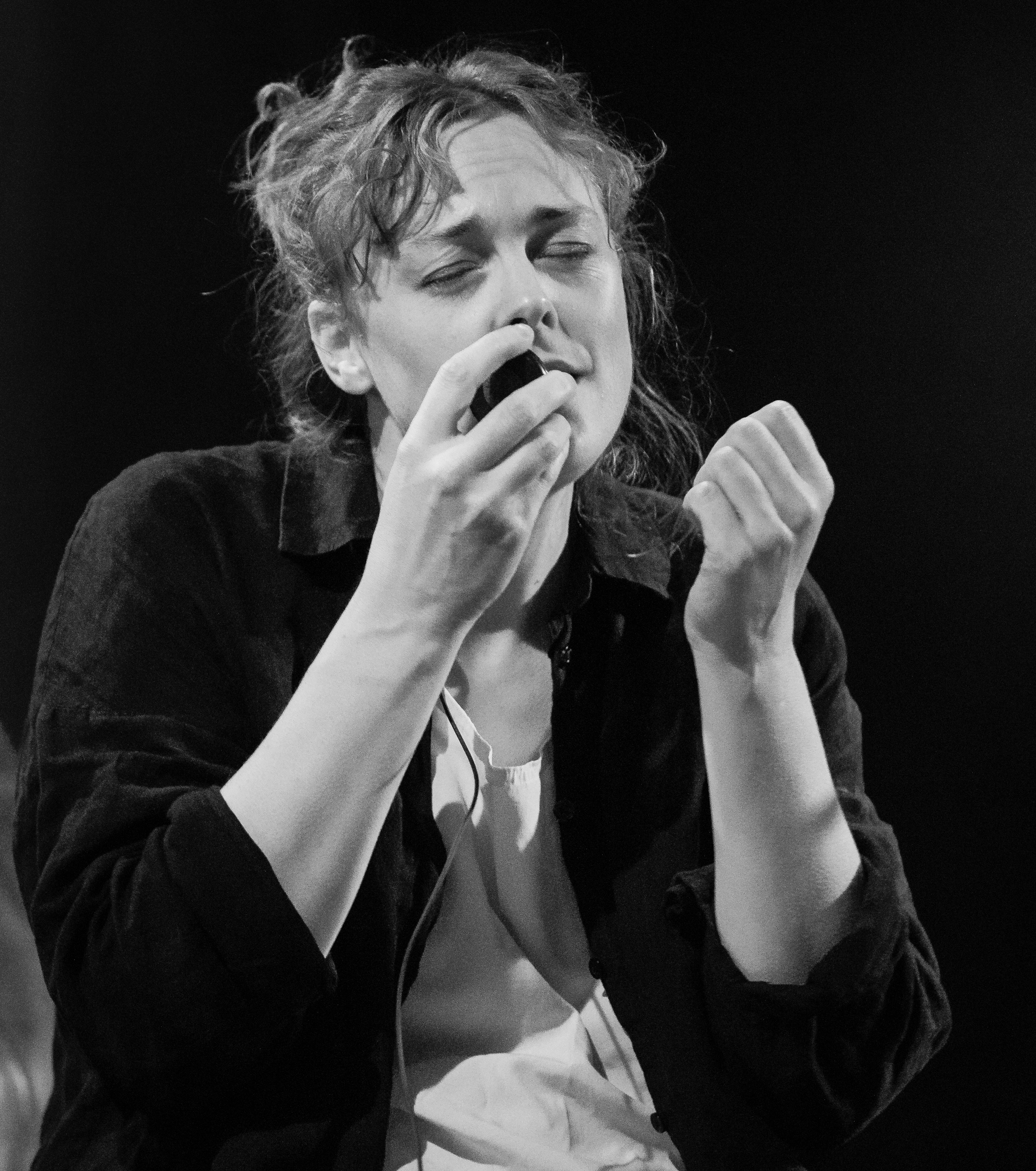
- Mari Kvien Brunvoll performs at Herr Nilsen, Oslo 2023; Photo: Tore Sætre

Background information
- Born: 20 February 1984 (age 42); Molde, Møre og Romsdal
- Origin: Norway
- Genres: Electronica, jazz, traditional folk music
- Instruments: Vocals, percussions
- Label: Jazzland Recordings
- Website: www.jazzprofil.no/members/marikvienbrunvoll

Mari Kvien Brunvoll (born 20 February 1984 in Molde, Norway) is a Norwegian folk and jazz singer who has attracted attention at festivals internationally with her solo concept, where the voice is complemented by small electronic and acoustic instruments in a sound inspired by jazz, pop and folk music.

== Career ==
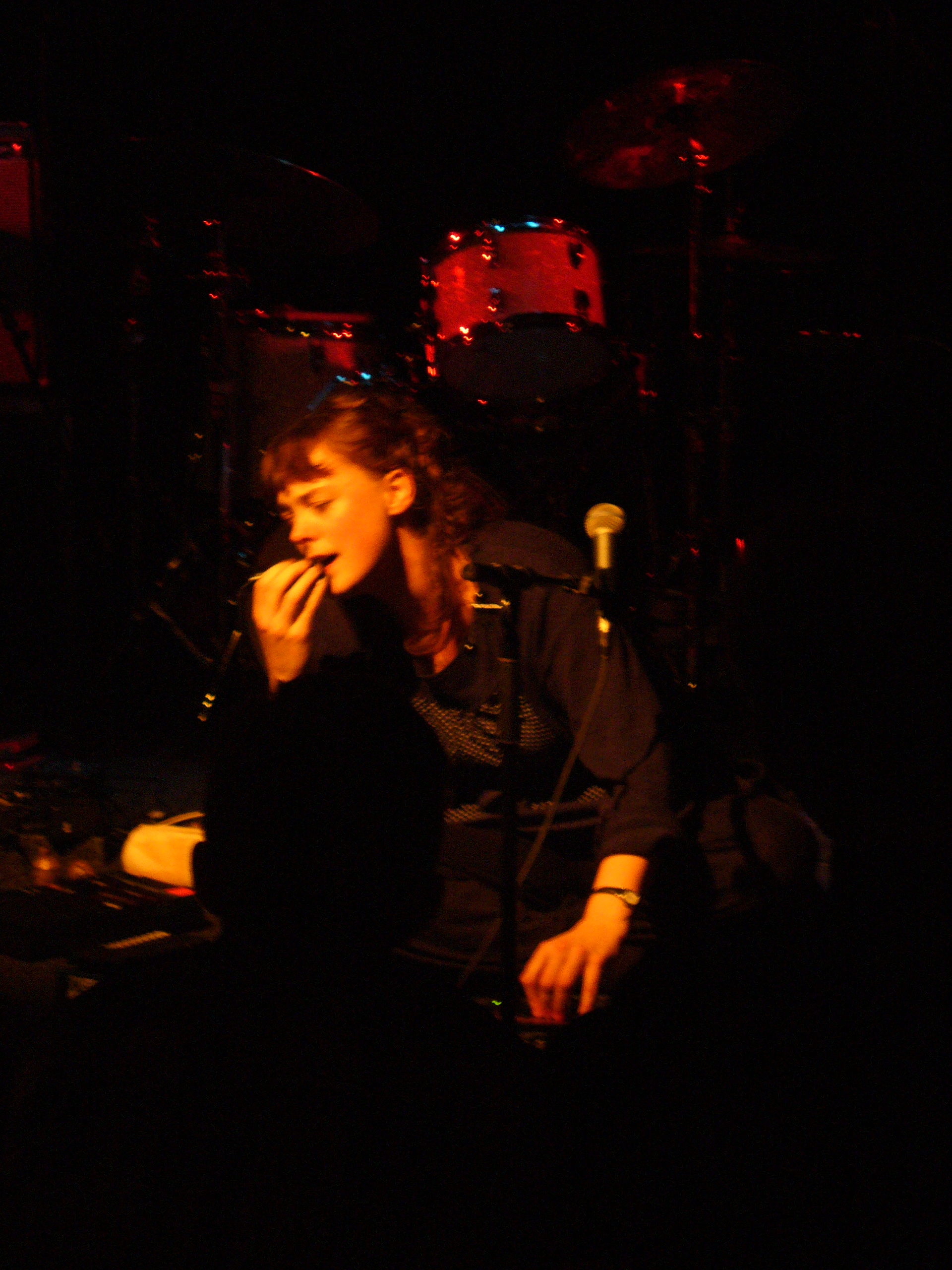
Mari Kvien Brunvoll at Sardinen, USF Verftet 2012.

Brunvoll is a 2010 graduate of the Grieg Academy in Bergen. She won the Vital Award at the Nattjazz, Bergen 2009. Her first appearance at Moldejazz was in 2010 with her solo project. Brunvoll is known for her amazing solo project, which has received critical acclaim through concerts at Nattjazz, Moldejazz, and a number of jazz clubs around Europe.

As a student in the jazz program at Grieg Academy she was the Norwegian representative at the International 12 Points festival in Stavanger in 2010. The four-day gathering for artists and bands from twelve countries showed the diversity and power of today's young European music improvisers. Brunvoll's performance is documented on her self-titled debut album from 2012.

Bugge Wesseltoft picked "the extremely talented" Brunvoll as one of three promising musicians for a presentation at Bylarm 2010. He played a double concerto with her in Amsterdam 2009.

Brunvoll has since 2000 performed extensively at festivals in Norway and across Europe. Her contributions at Nattjazz (she won the talent award at Nattjazz in 2009), Moldejazz and the Øyafestivalen in Oslo is just the top of the list. She received the Vozzajazz award in 2011, played at the Kilkenny Art Festival the same year and has cooperated in duo with Stein Urheim, who also received the Vossajazz Award in 2010 for his diverse career at the Norwegian jazz scene.

Along with Mats Eilertsen Quartet, Stian Westerhus, and Randi Tytingvåg Ensemble, Brunvoll was one of the performers at the International jazz festival Jazzahead in Bremen 2011. Together with guitarist Stian Westerhus, and saxophonists Karl Seglem and Frøy Aagre, she received support from the 2011 Norwegian Jazz Launch. She performed at the North Sea Jazz Festival in Rotterdam 2012, with Terje Isungset. On 7 March 2014 the Norwegian record label Hubro released an album featuring her, Åsmund Weltzien and Øyvind Hegg-Lunde performing under the name Building Instrument. Brunvoll was headliner meeting Ensemble Denada at Kongsberg Jazz Festival, performing the commissioned work for the festival.

== Personal life ==
She is the daughter of Lawyer Knut Anker Brunvoll (b. 1945) and jazz singer and pianist Inger Johanne Brunvoll (born Kvien in 1945), and the younger sister of songwriter, guitarist and vocalist Ane Brun (b. 1976) and photographer Bjørn Brunvoll (b. 1973).

== Honors ==
- 2009: The Vital Talent Award at Nattjazz
- 2011: Vossajazzprisen

== Discography ==
=== Solo albums ===
- 2012: Mari Kvien Brunvoll (Jazzland)

=== Collaborations ===
With Stein Urheim

- 2011: Daydream Community EP – Stein & Mari (Jazzland)
- 2013: Daydream Twin (Jazzland)
- 2015: For Individuals Facing the Terror of Cosmic Loneliness (Jazzland)

With Building Instrument

- 2014: Building Instrument (Hubro)
- 2016: Kem Som Kan Å Leve (Hubro)
- 2018: Mangelen Min (Hubro)

With Kvien & Sommer

- 2015: Weathering (Full Of Nothing)

With Salmo

- 2025: MAURI

Other projects

- 2011: Pressure (Grappa), with Splashgirl
- 2012: Valgets Kavaler (sueTunes), with various artists (Stein Urheim)

Awards
Preceded by Stein Urheim	Recipient of the Vossajazzprisen; 2011	Succeeded by Sigrid Moldestad
