= The Megaphonic Thrift =

Rock music group from Bergen, Norway

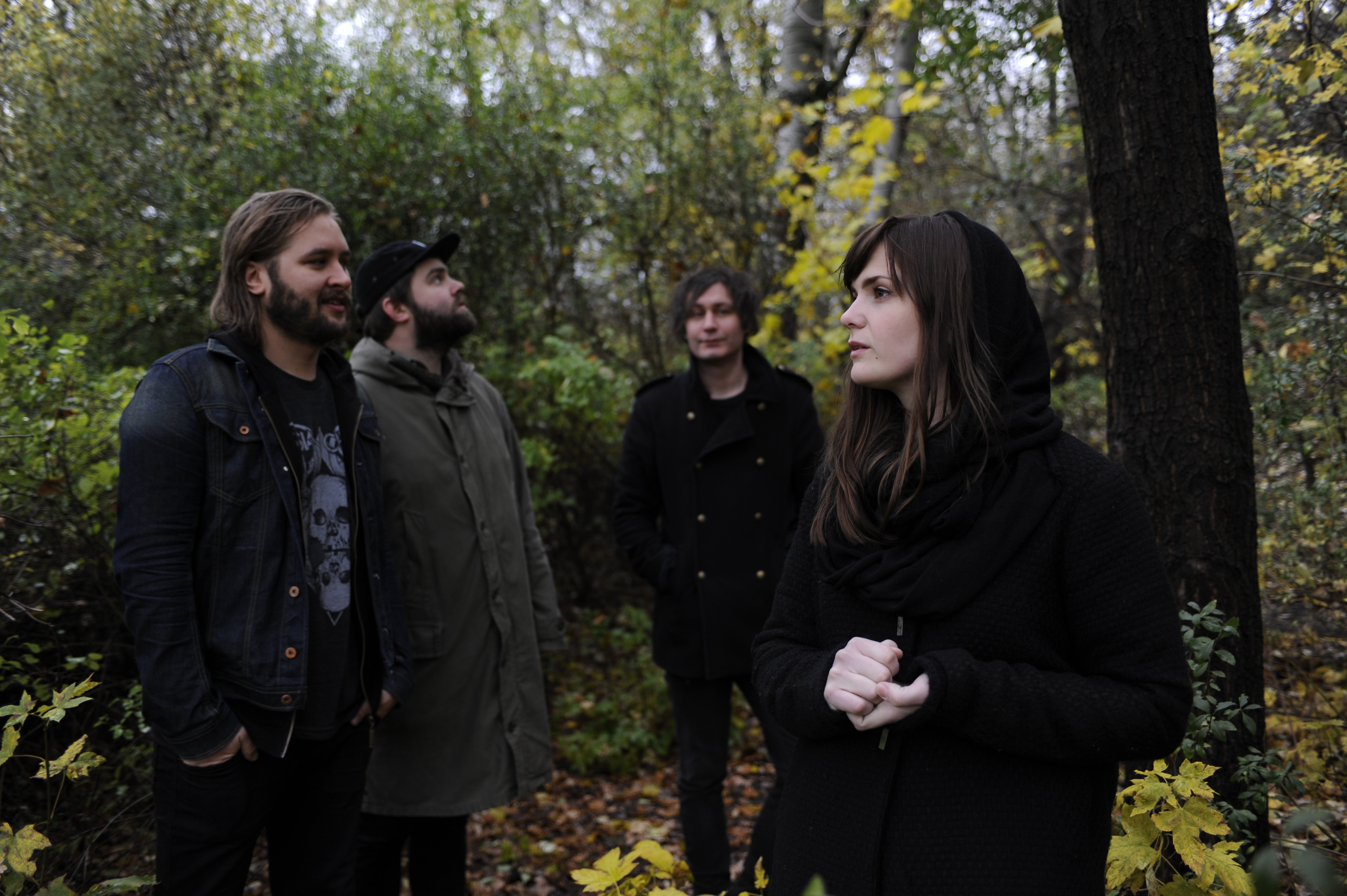
The Megaphonic Thrift

The Megaphonic Thrift is a Norwegian band from Bergen. The members are Richard Myklebust, Linn Frøkedal, Fredrik Vogsborg and Njål Clementsen.

The band has toured Europe and North America, and performed at SXSW, CMJ, The Great Escape, PopKomm and Roskilde, as well as several support shows for Dinosaur Jr, Stephen Malkmus and the Jicks, Band of Horses and A Place to Bury Strangers.

The Megaphonic Thrift recorded their third album together with producer Jørgen Træen in the Duper Studio. The album, Sun Stare Sounds, was released by YAP Records (Datarock, Noxagt, Ungdomskulen) in 2015.

== Discography ==
- Sun Stare Sound LP (2015)
- "Moonstruck" 7". Tuba in Norway, Pad & Pen in Denmark, Sonic Unyon in North America, ClubAC30 in Europe and Donuts Pop in Japan (2012)
- The Megaphonic Thrift LP. Tuba in Norway, Pad & Pen in Denmark, Sonic Unyon in North America, ClubAC30 in Europe and Donuts Pop in Japan (2012)
- "Talks Like a Weed King" 7". Club AC30 (2011)
- Decay Decoy LP. Hype City Recordings in Norway, ClubAC30 in Europe, Pad & Pen Records in Denmark, Sonic Unyon in North America and Donuts Pop in Japan (2010).
- A Thousand Years Of Deconstruction EP. Spoon Train Audio/Tuba (2009) and Deadly People Records (2010).
- "Neues/Break It Down" 7". Sounds Gold (2010)
- "Acid Blues" Digital single. Deadly Records (2009)
- "Acid Blues/Mad Mary" 7". Sounds Gold (2008)
