= Electric Eye (band) =

Psychedelic rock band from Bergen, Norway

- Origin: Bergen, Norway
- Genres: Psychedelic rock, drone rock, space rock
- Years active: 2012–present
- Members: Øystein Braut; Njål Clementsen; Anders Bjelland; Øyvind Hegg-Lunde
- Website: www.electriceye.no

Electric Eye are a psychedelic rock group from Bergen, Norway formed in 2012 by Øystein Braut, Njål Clementsen, Anders Bjelland and Øyvind Hegg-Lunde. After their first single, "Tangerine", they released their debut album, Pick-up, Lift-off, Space, Time, in 2013.

== History ==
Electric Eye formed in 2012 and had their first appearance at Hulen in Bergen, May 3, 2012. Electric Eye play droned-out psych-rock inspired by the blues, Indian folk music and rock and roll. Electric Eye released their debut LP, Pick-up, Lift-off, Space, Time, in April 2013 on Norwegian Klangkollektivet and UK label Fuzz Club Records. After the debut release, the band have toured all over Europe, including appearances at Iceland Airwaves 2013, Eurosonic 2014, South by Southwest 2014 and The Great Escape Festival 2014.

== Discography ==
Albums

- Pick-up, Lift-off, Space, Time (2013, Klangkollektivet, Goomah Music)
- Different Sun (2016, Jansen Plateproduksjon)
- Live At Blå (2016, Jansen Plateproduksjon)
- From The Poisonous Tree (2017, Jansen Plateproduksjon)
- Horizons (2021, Fuzz Club Records)
- Dyp Tid (2024, Fuzz Club Records)

Singles

- "Tangerine" (2013)
- "Bless" (2015)
- "Mercury Rise" (2016)
- "Turn Around, Face The Sun" (2017)
- "Invisible Prison" (2017)
- "Den Atmosfaeriske Elven" (2021)
- "Put The Secret In Your Pocket" (2021)
