= Chateau Neuf Spelemannslag =

Norwegian folk music band

Chateau Neuf Spelemannslag (CNS), more commonly known as simply Chateau Neuf, is a Norwegian folk music band that is experimenting with different musical styles. The band was formed in 1994 at the University of Oslo, and consists of some nineteen odd instrumental players and vocalists. They have become famous in the folk scene for combining traditional Norwegian folk tunes with modern sentiments from genres such as jazz, swing, classical, and rock.

== Discography ==
=== Albums ===
- Spell (1995)
- Gamle Guro (1996)
- Tjuvgods (1997), was also released under the title Stolen Goods for the North American audience
- Curing Norwegian Stiffness (2001)

=== Singles & EPs ===
- Gubben Garberg (1995)
- Halling Fra Numedal (1997)
