= Stein Urheim =

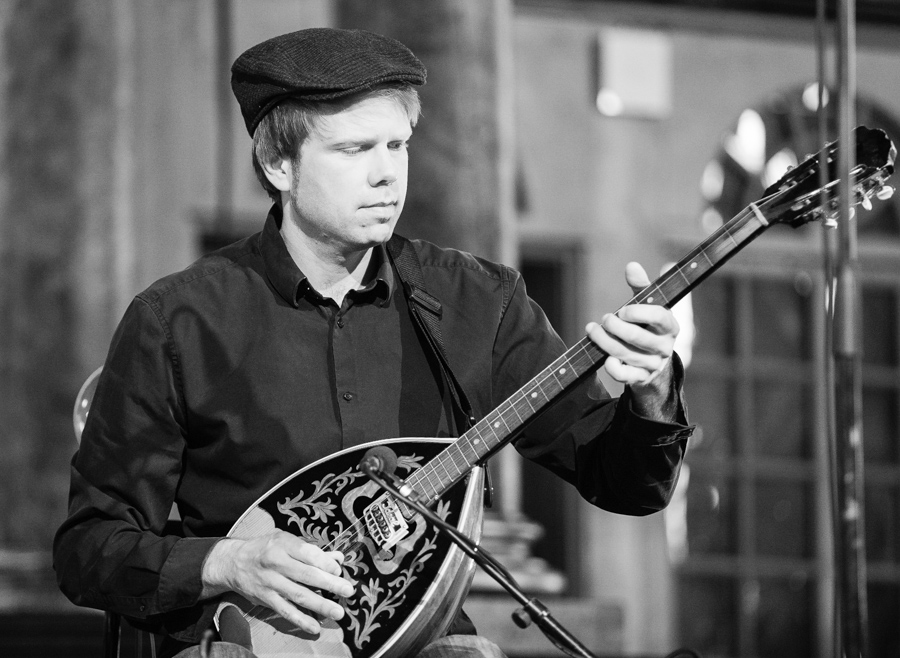
- Stein Urheim performing in 2019

Background information
- Born: 4 March 1979 (age 46); Bergen, Hordaland
- Origin: Norway
- Genres: Jazz, blues
- Occupations: Musician, composer
- Instruments: Guitar, vocals
- Labels: Hubro Music, Jazzland, Soundlet, Grappa, Audun Audio
- Website: web.archive.org/web/20220501113634/https://steinurheim.com/

Stein Urheim (born 4 March 1979) is a Norwegian jazz musician (guitar) and composer, known from cooperations with Gabriel Fliflet and Mari Kvien Brunvoll.

== Career ==
The Bergen-born guitarist Stein Urheim's name has appeared in an increasing number of contexts in recent years. In 2009 he released his debut album Three Sets of Music and the following year he received the Vossajazz festival-Award.

He has toured and released 3 critically acclaimed duo albums with singer Mari Kvien Brunvoll, Daydream Community (2011), Daydream Twin (2013) and For Individuals Facing The Terror Of Cosmic Loneliness (2015), on the Jazzland label. The duo met and started working together around 2006 at the Grieg Music Academy in Bergen, where they both studied. He was a member of Gabriel Fliflet's Åresong band (2010–2011), and participated on The Last Hurrah's debut album (2011) on Rune Grammofon. He has also written for, arranged and played on several albums by Steady Steele (2002–2006), and worked with numerous other bands and music projects, including Tom Sawyer & The Huckleberry Finns (2004–2007), Bearfarm (2006–2012), Thea Hjelmeland's Solar Plexus (2014) and Erlend Apneseth's Nattsongar (2017).

He has released 6 albums for the Hubro music label under his own name:

Kosmolodi (2012), Stein Urheim (2014), Strandebarm (2016), Utopian Tales (2017), Simple Pieces & Paper Cut-Outs (2019) and Downhill Uplift (2020).

== Honors ==
- 2010: Vossajazz Award

== Discography ==
=== Albums ===
- 2009: Three sets of music (Soundlet)
- 2011: Stein & Mari's Daydream Community (Jazzland), with Mari Kvien Brunvoll
- 2012: Kosmolodi (Hubro)
- 2013: Daydream Twin — Stein Urheim & Mari Kvien Brunvoll (Jazzland Recordings)[4]
- 2014: Stein Urheim - Self titled (Hubro)[5]
- 2015: For Individuals Facing the Terror of Cosmic Loneliness (Jazzland), with Mari Kvien Brunvoll
- 2016: Strandebarm (Hubro)
- 2017: Utopian Tales (Hubro)
- 2019: Simple Pieces & Paper Cut-Outs (Hubro)
- 2020: Downhill Uplift (Hubro)

=== Compilations ===
- 2012: Valgets kavaler (sueTunes Records), with various artists

Awards
Preceded by Kjetil Møster	Recipient of the Vossajazzprisen; 2010	Succeeded by Mari Kvien Brunvoll
