= Nattjazz =

Annual jazz festival in Bergen, Norway

Bergen International Jazz Festival Nattjazz
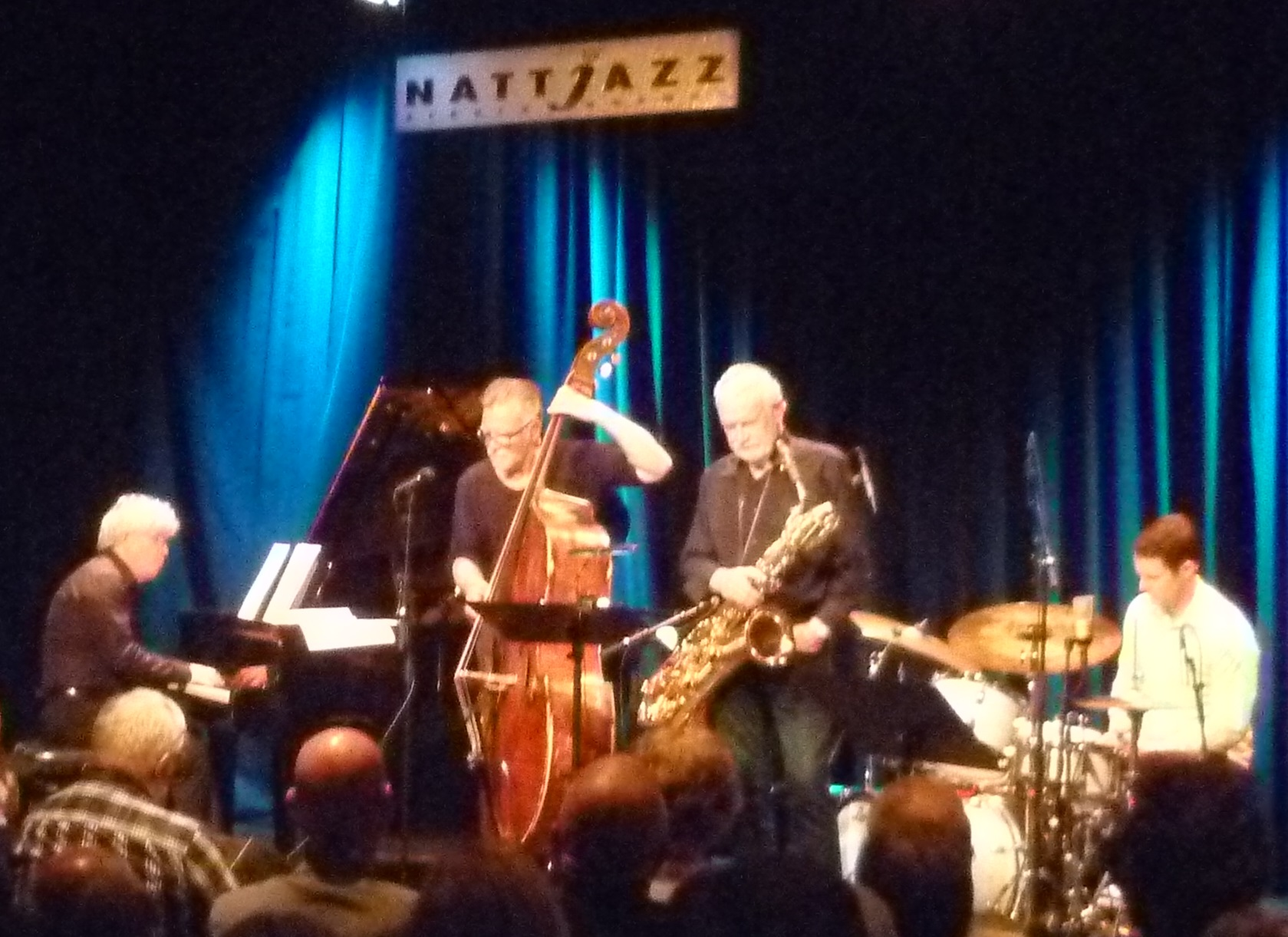
- Bjørn Alterhaug Quintet 2016.
- Status: Active
- Genre: Jazz Festival
- Date: May - June
- Begins: 24 May 2019
- Ends: 1 June 2019
- Frequency: Annually
- Locations: Verftet, Bergen
- Country: Norway
- Years active: 1973 - present
- Inaugurated: Founded 1972
- Website: nattjazz.no

Bergen International Jazz Festival or Nattjazz, is one of the largest jazz festivals of Norway. The festival has a musical profile with an emphasis on ethnic and contemporary jazz. It is held annually in late May, coinciding with Festspillene i Bergen, and is located at Verftet in Bergen Municipality.

== Biography ==
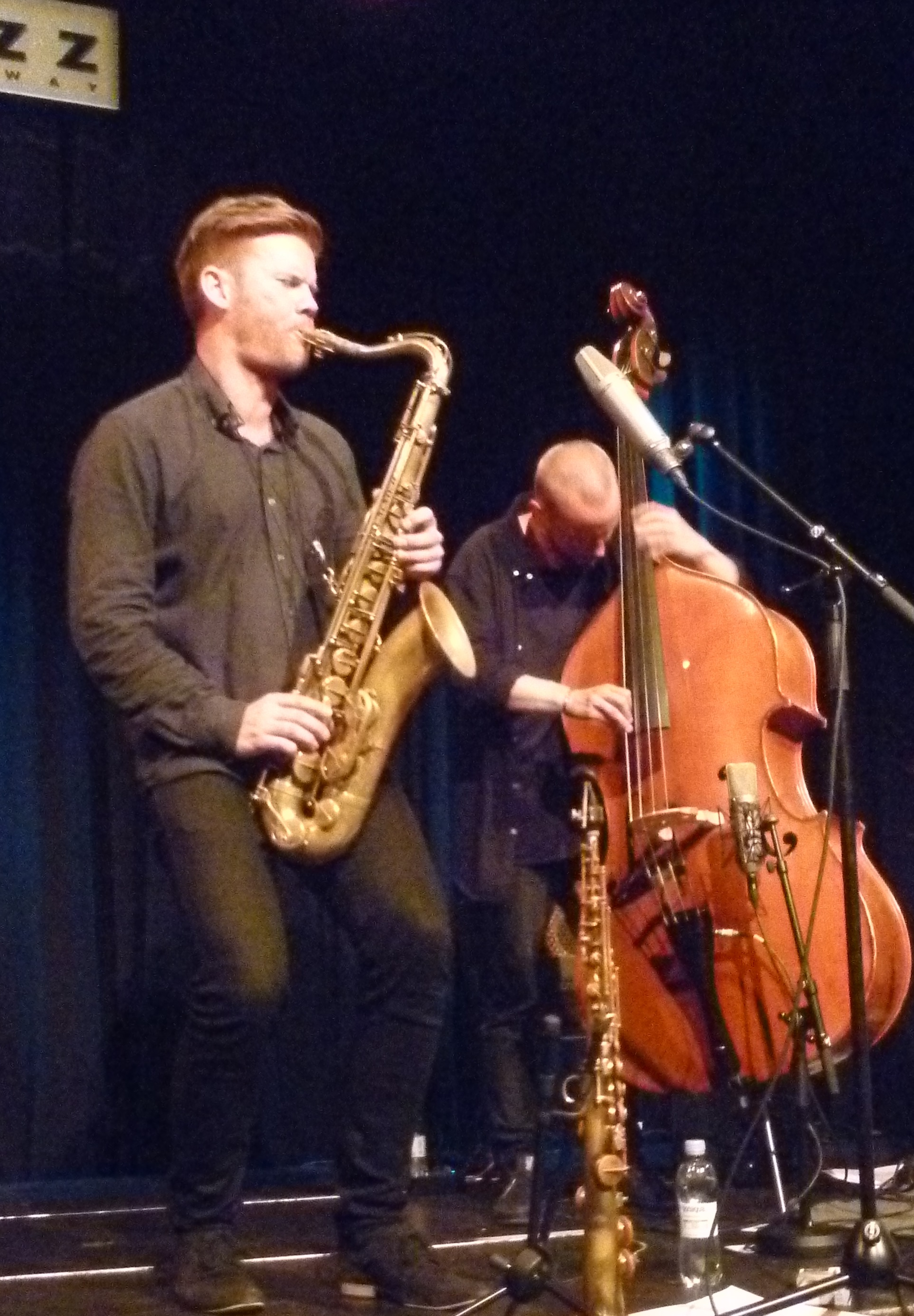
Andre Roligheten and Petter Eldh with Gard Nilssen's Acoustic Unity 2016.

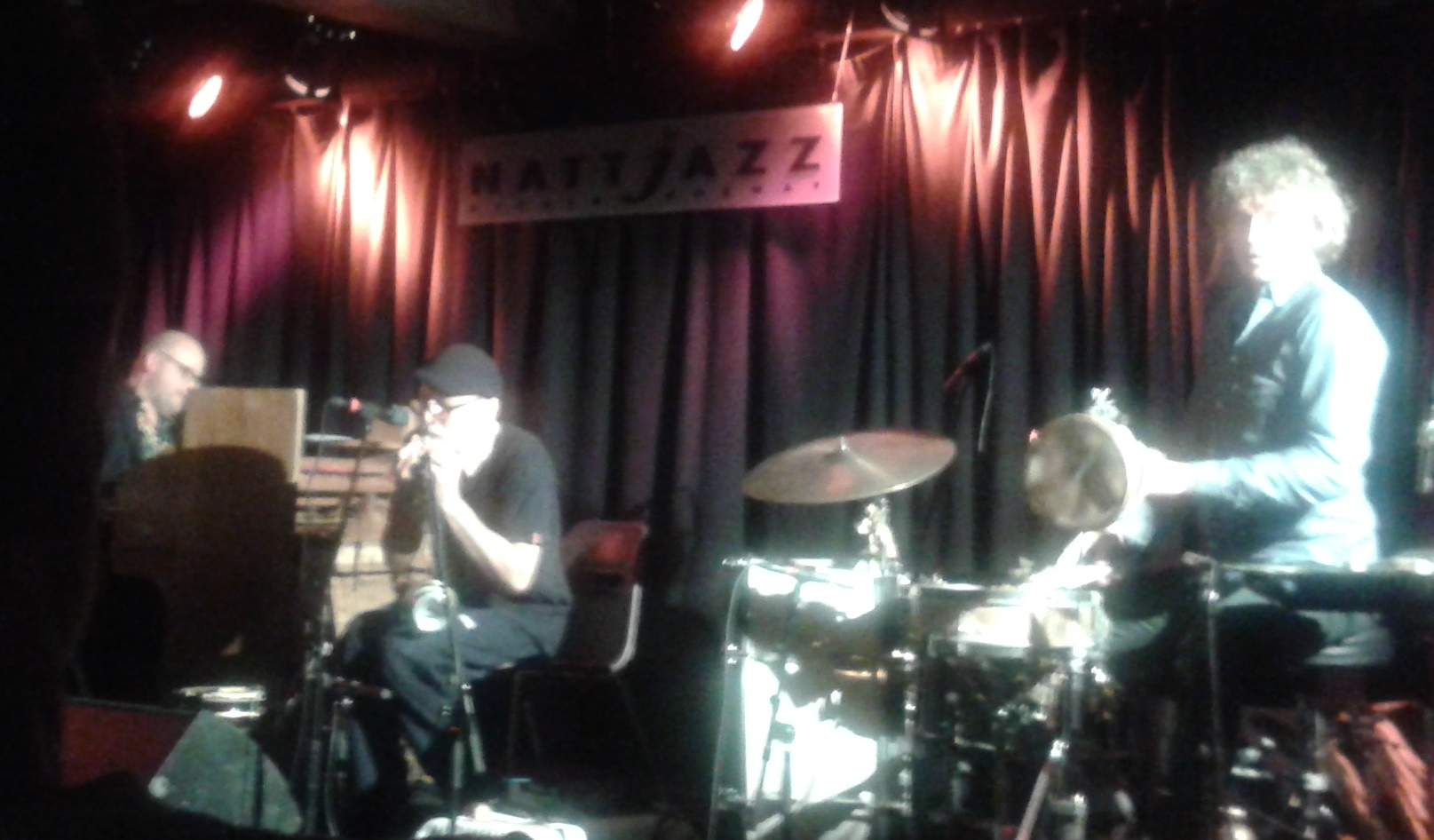
Agbaland at Nattjazz May 30, 2015.

The festival was arranged for the first time in 1972 at Håndverkeren in Bergen (now closed). It moved to Studentsenteret in 1978 (now demolished and rebuilt), and eventually to USF Verftet in 1994. In 2012 Nattjazz was held in different localities in Vågsbunnen because of the reconstructions of USF Verftet.

During the course of the festival most concerts are held indoors, but with some outdoor concerts too. The festival has also collaborated with other events, such as Festspillene i Bergen in Grieghallen. Inside the USF Verftet there have been concerts on four different stages and the public bought admission to the house, not to individual concerts. The four scenes that were in use varied in capacity from about 70 to 700 people. Some rooms were set up with seating, others primarily with people standing. In addition, it was adapted to include areas where the public could relax and watch what happened at the various stages using internal channels. There were normally several artists on every stage in the course of an evening. This scheme was followed in 2012, although the stages were in different localities. Future plans are to re-establish the USF Verftet as the main location for events at the festival.

Since 2013 Røkeriet at USF Verftet has been the main venue for the Nattjazz events.

== Nattjazzprisen or Hansaprisen ==
Nattjazzprisen or Hansaprisen – verdt å vente på (Hansa Prize) was established in 2005 by the jazz festival Nattjazz in Bergen, Norway in collaboration with Hansa Borg Bryggerier. The prize worth NKR 50,000 is awarded annually under the Nattjazz in Bergen and is given to an artist the jury believes has international qualities and the potential for international success.

The following musicians have been awarded the Hansaprisen:

- 2005: Tord Gustavsen (piano), from Hurdal
- 2006: Kjetil Møster (saxophone), from Os
- 2007: Helge Lien (piano), from Moelv

Vital/Nattjazz talent award

- 2004: Marius Neset
- 2007: Øyvind Hegg-Lunde (drums), from Moelv
- 2009: Mari Kvien Brunvoll (vocals), from Molde

== See also ==
- List of jazz festivals
