= Erlend Apneseth =

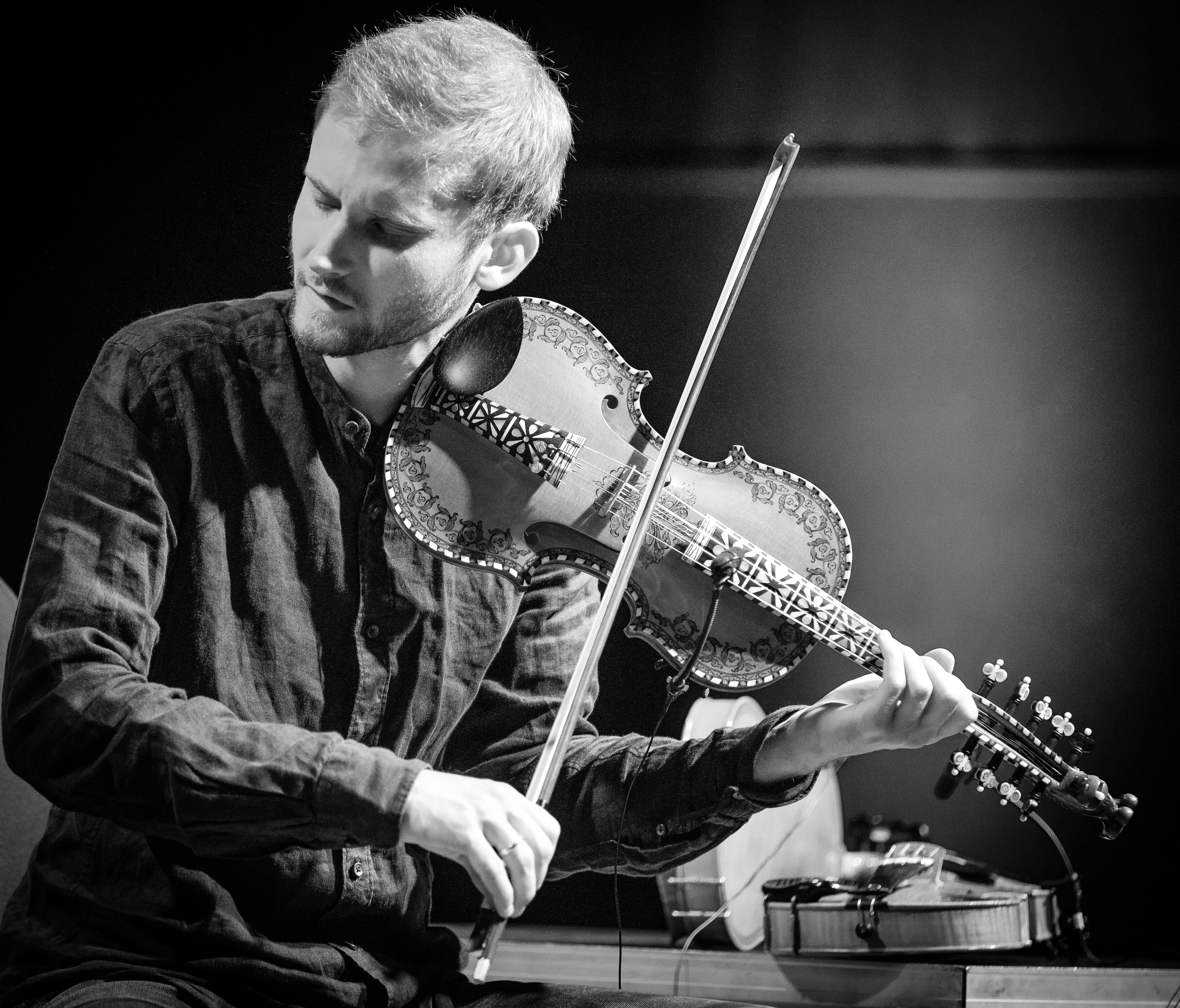
- Apneseth at the 2018 Kongsberg Jazzfestival

Background information
- Born: 11 August 1990 (age 35); Jølster, Sunnfjord
- Origin: Norway
- Genres: Jazz, impro
- Occupations: Musician, composer
- Instrument: Hardanger fiddle (Hardingfele)
- Member of: Erlend Apneseth Trio
- Website: erlendapneseth.com

Erlend Apneseth (born 11 August 1990) is a hardingfele player from Jølster Municipality in Sogn og Fjordane.

== Biography ==
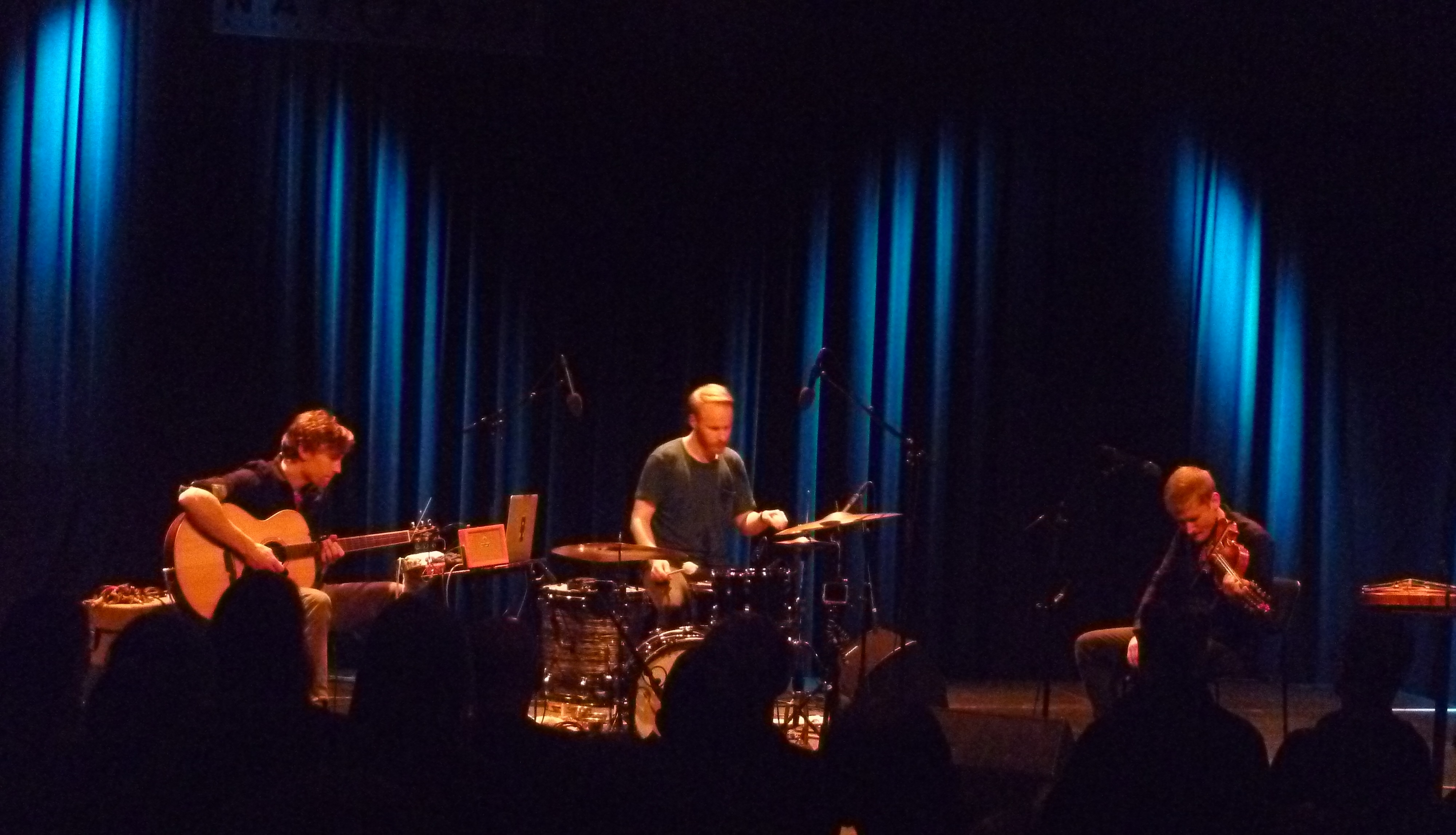
Erlend Apneseth Trio at the 2016 Nattjazz in Bergen, Norway.

Apneseth is known for his critically acclaimed albums on HUBRO / Grappa, with his trio featuring drummer Øyvind Hegg-Lunde (drums, percussion) and Stephan Meidell (guitar, electronics), as well as his own solo-projects. He has written music for cinema, theatre, dance performances, poetry, and musical ensembles and orchestras in different genres. As a soloist he has appeared with Bergen Filharmoniske Orkester and The Norwegian Chamber Orchestra among others. He has received several awards, such as Gammleng-prisen, Øyvind Berghs Minnepris and the Folkelarm-award. Erlend Apneseth Trio's album «Salika, Molika», featurering accordionist Frode Haltli, received both the NOPA prize and Spellemannprisen, and was nominated for the Nordic Music Prize 2020.

== Honors ==
- 2012: Grappa Music debutant award
- 2013: Fureprisen (2013)
- 2014: Øivind Bergh memorial award
- 2014: Music Scholarship from Sparebanken Vest
- 2014: Ingerid, Synnøve and Elias Fegerstens foundation for the Norwegian composers and performing musicians
- 2016: Folkelarm-award for Det Andre Rommet
- 2016: Nominated for Spellemannprisen Det Andre Rommet
- 2017: Nominated for Spellemannprisen Nattsongar
- 2017: Nominated for Spellemannprisen Åra
- 2018: Gammleng-prisen
- 2018: NOPA-award 2018 Salika, Molika
- 2019: Nominated for Folkelarm-award 2019 for Salika, Molika (with Frode Haltli)
- 2019: Spellemannprisen 2019 for Salika, Molika
- 2019 Forsberg & Aulies legat 2019
- 2019 Nominated for Nordic Music Prize 2019 Salika, Molika
- 2020 Folkelarm-award 2020 Fragmentaritum

== Discography ==
=== Solo albums ===
- 2013: Blikkspor (Grappa)
- 2016: Det Andre Rommet (Hubro), with Erlend Apneseth Trio
- 2017: Nattsongar (Hubro)
- 2017: Åra (Hubro), with Erlend Apneseth Trio
- 2019: Salika, Molika (Hubro), with Erlend Apneseth Trio and Frode Haltli
- 2019: Fragmentarium (Hubro), Erland Apneseth with an Ensemble
- 2021: Lokk (Hubro) Erlend Apneseth Trio
