= Hubro Music albums discography =

The following is a summary of the Hubro Music albums. Hubro Music is a Norwegian record label dedicated to releasing music from the Norwegian jazz and improvised music scene, and is a label under the Grappa parent label.

Catalogue no.	Artist	Title	Releasing date	Format
HUBRO CD 2500	Splashgirl	Arbor	2009-11-02	CD
HUBRO CD 2501	Mats Eilertsen	Radio Yonder	2009-11-27	CD
HUBRO CD 2502	LabField	Collab	2010-02-01	CD
HUBRO CD 2503	Sigbjørn Apeland	Glossolalia	2011-02-07	CD
HUBRO CD 2504	Mats Eilertsen Trio	Elegy	2010-09-20	CD
HUBRO CD 2505	Huntsville	For Flowers, Cars And Merry Wars	2010-03-25	CD
HUBRO CD 2506	Ketil Bjørnstad	Early Piano Music	2011-04-08	2CD
HUBRO CD 2507	Mats Eilertsen	SkyDive	2011-09-02	CD
HUBRO CD 2508	Jæ	Balls And Kittens, Draught And Strangling Rain	2010-10-11	CD
HUBRO CD 2509	Splashgirl	Pressure	2011-04-19	CD
HUBRO CD 2510	1982	Pintura	2011-09-30	CD
HUBRO CD 2512	Erland Dahlen	Rolling Bomber	2012-02-13	CD
HUBRO CD 2513	Tore Brunborg, Kirsti Huke, Petter Vågan, Rune Nergaard, Gard Nilssen	Scent Of Soil	2011-11-21	CD
HUBRO CD 2514	Cakewalk	Wired	2012-03-23	CD
HUBRO CD 2515	Ballrogg	Cabin Music	2012-05-11	CD
HUBRO CD 2516	Jessica Sligter	Fear And The Framing	2012-10-05	CD
HUBRO CD 2518	Moskus	Salmesykkel	2012-08-31	CD
HUBRO CD 2519	Ivar Grydeland	Bathymetric Modes	2012-10-05	CD
HUBRO CD 2520	Splashgirl	Field Day Rituals	2013-02-01	CD
HUBRO CD 2521	Huntsville	Past Increasing, Future Receding	2013-09-20	CD
HUBRO CD 2522	1982 + BJ Cole	1982 + BJ Cole	2013-10-12	CD
HUBRO CD 2523	Bly De Blyant	ABC	2013-03-01	CD
HUBRO CD 2524	Mats Eilertsen Trio	Sails Set	2013-02-08	CD
HUBRO CD 2525	Erland Dahlen	Blossom Bells	2015-08-28	CD
HUBRO CD 2526	Cakewalk	Transfixed	2013-10-18	CD
HUBRO CD 2527	Møster!	Edvard Lygre Møster	2013-03-15	CD
HUBRO CD 2529	Stein Urheim	Stein Urheim	2014-02-21	CD
HUBRO CD 2530	Astro Sonic	Come Closer And I'll Tell You	2014-09-06	CD
HUBRO CD 2532	1982	A/B	2014-05-02	CD
HUBRO CD 2533	Geir Sundstøl	Furulund	2015-09-18	CD
HUBRO CD 2535	Moskus	Mestertyven	2014-04-11	CD
HUBRO CD 2536	Skadedyr	Kongekrabbe	2013-10-08	CD
HUBRO CD 2537	SkyDive Trio	Sun Moee	2015-02-20	CD
HUBRO CD 2538	Ivar Grydeland	Stop Freeze Wait Eat	2015-10-13	CD
HUBRO CD 2539	Bly De Blyant	Hindsight Bias	2014-01-31	CD
HUBRO CD 2541	Building Instrument	Building Instrument	2014-03-03	CD
HUBRO CD 2542	Christian Wallumrød	Pianokammer	2015-01-23	CD
HUBRO CD 2543	sPacemoNkey	The Karman Line	2014-02-28	CD
HUBRO CD 2544	Håkon Stene	Lush Laments For Lazy Mammal	2014-03-21	CD
HUBRO CD 2546	Frode Haltli	Vagabonde Blu	2014-09-26	CD
HUBRO CD 2547	Monkey Plot	Angående Omstendigheter Som Ikke Lar Seg Nedtegne	2015-03-06	CD
HUBRO CD 2548	Møster!	Inner Earth	2014-09-12	CD
HUBRO CD 2549	Huntsville	Pond	2015-03-13	CD
HUBRO CD 2551	Jessica Sligter	A Sense Of Growth	2016-01-29	CD
HUBRO CD 2552	LabField	Bucket Of Songs	2014-02-06	CD
HUBRO CD 2553	The Island Band	Like Swimming	2015-10-16	CD
HUBRO CD 2554	Moskus	Ulv Ulv	2016-04-01	CD
HUBRO CD 2555	Stein Urheim	Strandebarm	2016-03-18	CD
HUBRO CD 2556	Erik Honoré	Heliographs	2014-09-05	CD
HUBRO CD 2557	Finland: Ivar Grydeland, Pål Hausken, Morten Qvenild, Jo Berger Myhre	Rainy Omen	2015-06-05	CD
HUBRO CD 2558	1982	Chromola	2017-01-20	CD
HUBRO CD 2559	Splashgirl	Hibernation	2015-11-06	CD
HUBRO CD 2560	Skadedyr	Culturen	2016-03-11	CD
HUBRO CD 2561	Building Instrument	Kem Som Kan Å Leve	2016-04-22	CD
HUBRO CD 2563	Morten Qvenild	Personal Piano	2015-09-04	CD
HUBRO CD 2565	Møster!	When You Cut Into The Present	2015-09-11	CD
HUBRO CD 2566	Trondheim Jazz Orchestra / Christian Wallumrød	Untitled Arpeggios and Pulses	2015-09-30	CD
HUBRO CD 2567	Bly De Blyant	The Third Bly De Blyant Album	2016-06-10	CD
HUBRO CD 2569	Trondheim Jazz Orchestra / Kim Myhr & Jenny Hval	In The End His Voice Will Be The Sound Of Paper	2016-02-29	CD
HUBRO CD 2570	Erlend Apneseth Trio	Det Andre Rommet	2016-02-05	CD
HUBRO CD 2572	Hilde Marie Holsen	Lazuli	2018-06-01	CD
HUBRO CD 2573	Christian Wallumrød Ensemble	Kurzsam And Fulger	2016-10-07	CD
HUBRO CD 2574	Stephan Meidell	Metrics	2017-03-17	CD
HUBRO CD 2575	Cakewalk	Ishihara	2017-02-24	CD
HUBRO CD 2576	Geir Sundstøl	Langen Ro	2016-10-28	CD
HUBRO CD 2577	Møster!	States Of Minds	2018-08-31	2CD
HUBRO CD 2578	Kim Myhr	Bloom	2016-09-23	CD
HUBRO CD 2579	Moon Relay	Full Stop Etc.	2017-03-24	CD
HUBRO CD 2580	Øyvind Torvund	The Exotica Album	2019-03-08	CD
HUBRO CD 2581	Dans les arbres	Phosphorescence	2017-02-17	CD
HUBRO CD 2582	Laurence Crane / asamisimasa	Sound Of Horse	2016-11-25	CD
HUBRO CD 2584	Erlend Apneseth Trio	Åra	2017-09-15	CD
HUBRO CD 2585	Stein Urheim	Utopian Tales	2017-09-18	CD
HUBRO CD 2586	Brutter	Reveal and Rise	2017-06-09	CD
HUBRO CD 2587	Splashgirl	Sixth Sense	2018-03-16	CD
HUBRO CD 2588	Moskus	Mirakler	2018-08-17	CD
HUBRO CD 2589	Phonophani	Animal Imagination	2017-05-12	CD
HUBRO CD 2591	Michael Pisaro, Håkon Stene, Kristine Tjøgersen	Asleep, Street, Pipes, Tones	2017-06-09	CD
HUBRO CD 2593	Kim Myhr	You / Me	2017-11-24	CD
HUBRO CD 2595	Erland Dahlen	Clocks	2017-09-08	CD
HUBRO CD 2596	SkyDive Trio	Sun Sparkle	2018-02-02	CD
HUBRO CD 2597	Skadedyr	Musikk!	2018-04-27	CD
HUBRO CD 2598	Nils Økland Band	Lysning	2017-10-20	CD
HUBRO CD 2599	Erik Honoré	Unrest	2017-10-13	CD
HUBRO CD 2601	Ensemble neoN	Niblock / Lamb	2019-06-21	CD
HUBRO CD 2602	Slagr	Dirr	2018-02-16	CD
HUBRO CD 2603	Geir Sundstøl	Brødløs	2018-10-05	CD
HUBRO CD 2604	Frode Haltli	Avant Folk	2018-04-06	CD
HUBRO CD 2605	Moon Relay	IMI	2018-10-12	CD
HUBRO CD 2606	Mats Eilertsen	Reveries And Revelations	2019-06-07	CD
HUBRO CD 2608	Building Instrument	Mangelen Min	2018-11-09	CD
HUBRO CD 2612	Kim Myhr	Pressing Clouds Passing Crowds	2018-11-23	CD
HUBRO CD 2613	Frode Haltli	Border Woods	2019-05-03	CD
HUBRO CD 2616	Ståle Storløkken	The Haze Of Sleeplessness	2019-03-29	CD
HUBRO CD 2618	Exoterm	Exits Into A Corridor	2019-06-28	CD
HUBRO CD 2619	Jo Berger Myhre & Ólafur Björn Ólafsson	Lanzarote	2019-10-04	CD
HUBRO CD 2621	Erlend Apneseth Trio with Frode Haltli	Salika, Molika	2019-04-12	CD
HUBRO CD 2625	Skarbø Skulekorps	Skarbø Skulekorps	2019-09-27	CD
HUBRO CD 2626	Trond Kallevåg Hansen	Bedehus & Hawaii	2019-04-05	CD
HUBRO CD 2628	Bushman's Revenge	Et hån mot overklassen	2019-07-12	CD
HUBRO LP 3536	Skadedyr	Kongekrabbe	2013-10-04	CD
HUBRO LP 2505	Huntsville	For Flowers, Cars And Merry Wars	2011-02-06	LP
HUBRO LP 2511	Splashgirl / Huntsville	Splashgirl / Huntsville	2013-02-06	LP
HUBRO LP 2523	Bly De Blyant	A B C	2014-02-06	LP
HUBRO LP 2548	Møster!	Inner Earth	2014-02-06	LP
HUBRO LP 2565	Møster!	When You Cut Into The Present	2015-09-11	LP
HUBRO LP 2573	Christian Wallumrød Ensemble	Kurzsam and Fulger	2016-10-07	LP
HUBRO LP 3507	Mats Eilertsen	SkyDive	2011-09-02	2LP
HUBRO LP 3509	Splashgirl	Pressure	2011-08-19	LP
HUBRO LP 3510	1982	Pintura	2011-09-30	LP
HUBRO LP 3513	Tore Brunborg, Kirsti Huke, Petter Vågan, Rune Nergaard, Gard Nilssen	Scent Of Soil	2011-11-29	LP
HUBRO LP 3514	Cakewalk	Wired	2012-02-06	LP
HUBRO LP 3516	Jessica Sligter	Fear And The Framing	2012-02-06	LP
HUBRO LP 3517	Stein Urheim	Kosmolodi	2012-02-06	LP
HUBRO LP 3518	Moskus	Salmesykkel	2012-02-06	LP
HUBRO LP 3520	Splashgirl	Field Day Rituals	2013-02-06	LP 2x12"
HUBRO LP 3521	Huntsville	Past Increasing, Future Receding	2013-02-01	LP
HUBRO LP 3522	1982 + BJ Cole	1982 + BJ Cole	2012-10-12	LP
HUBRO LP 3524	Mats Eilertsen Trio	Sails Set	2013-03-14	LP
HUBRO LP 3526	Cakewalk	Transfixed	2013-10-18	LP
HUBRO LP 3527	Møster!	Edvard Lygre Møster	2013-03-15	LP
HUBRO LP 3530	Astro Sonic	Come Closer And I'll Tell You	2013-09-06	LP
HUBRO LP 3531	Moon Relay	Moon Relay	2013-04-20	LP 12", MiniAlbum
HUBRO LP 3532	1982	A/B	2014-05-02	CD/LP
HUBRO LP 3535	Moskus	Mestertyven	2014-04-11	LP
HUBRO LP 3539	Bly De Blyant	Hindsight Bias	2014-02-06	LP
HUBRO LP 3540	Strings & Timpani	Hyphen	2016-05-27	LP
HUBRO LP 3541	Building Instrument	Building Instrument	2014-01-31	CD/LP
HUBRO LP 3543	sPacemoNkey	The Karman Line	2014-02-28	LP
HUBRO LP 3545	Stephan Meidell	Cascades	2014-02-07	LP
HUBRO LP 3547	Monkey Plot	Angående Omstendigheter Som Ikke Lar Seg Nedtegne	2015-03-06	LP
HUBRO LP 3548	Møster!	Inner Earth	2014-09-12	LP
HUBRO LP 3549	Huntsville	Pond	2015-03-13	2LP
HUBRO LP 3552	LabField	Bucket Of Songs	2014-02-06	LP
HUBRO LP 3557	Finland: Ivar Grydeland, Pål Hausken, Morten Qvenild, Jo Berger Myhre	Rainy Omen	2015-06-05	LP
HUBRO LP 3573	Christian Wallumrød Ensemble	Kurzsam and Fulger	2016-10-07	LP
HUBRO LP 3574	Stephan Meidell	Metrics	2017-03-17	LP CD
HUBRO LP 3575	Cakewalk	Ishihara	2017-02-24	LP CD
HUBRO LP 3612	Kim Myhr	Pressing Clouds Passing Crowds	2018-12-21	LP
HUBRO LP 3617	Jo David Meyer Lysne	Henger i luften	2019-01-19	LP
