= Nordic Music Prize =

Nordic countries annual music award

- Awarded for: Best album from the Nordic Countries
- First award: 2011
- Website: bylarm.no/awards/phonofile-nordic-music-prize/

The Nordic Music Prize is an annual award for the Best Nordic Album Of The Year, inspired by the Mercury Prize and introduced in 2010. The prize was initiated by the by:Larm conference in Norway. The first Nordic Music Prize was presented by the Prince Of Norway during by:Larm in Oslo in February 2011.

The prize was created to create a stronger unity across the Nordic countries industry, to increase international interest and awareness of what the region has to offer musically and, to refocus on the full-length album as an art form.

The winner is decided by a selection involving each Nordic country's domestic recording industry, that lead to representatives converging on Oslo with a list of ten albums from their nation, and these are then whittled down to 12 final nominations. The final choice is made by a jury composed of international journalists and label people.

== Jury ==
- Jude Rogers – Journalist/music critic of The Guardian
- Stuart Maconie – Radio DJ/music critic of BBC
- Eric Deines – director of A&R and Communication Jagjaguwar
- Jeannette Lee – co-owner of Rough Trade Records / Rough Trade Management

=== The Nordic Music Prize Committee ===
- Anna Ullman – Denmark
- Annah Björk – Sweden
- Ilkka Mattila – Finland
- Audun Vinger – Norway
- Arnar Eggert Thoroddsen – Iceland

== Winners and nominees ==
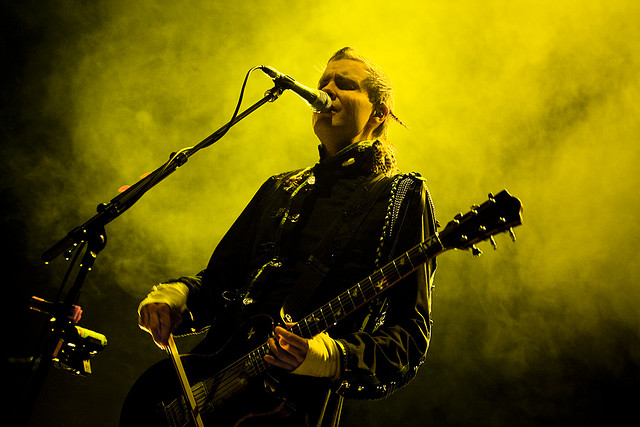
Jónsi won the inaugural edition in 2011

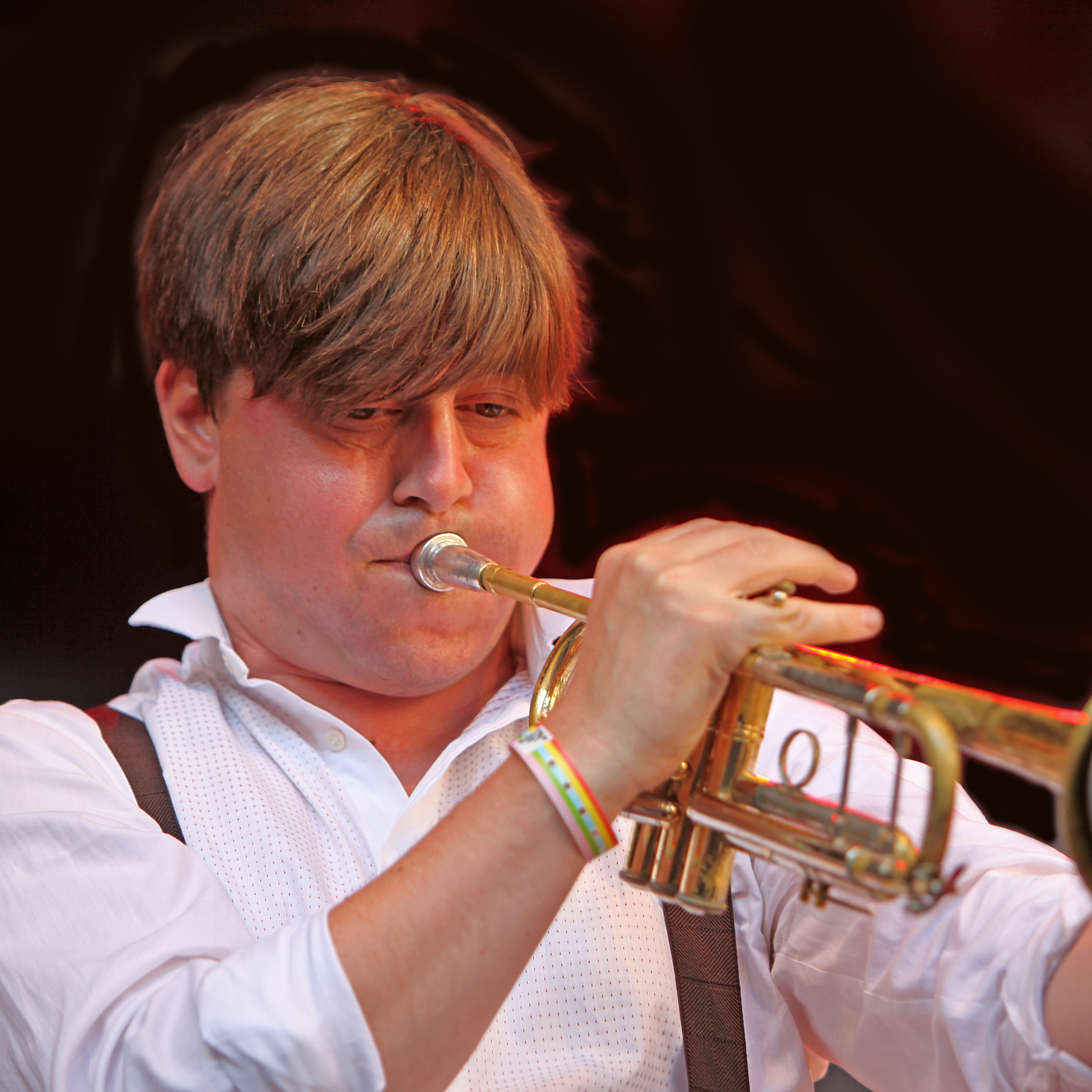
2012 winner Goran Kajfeš

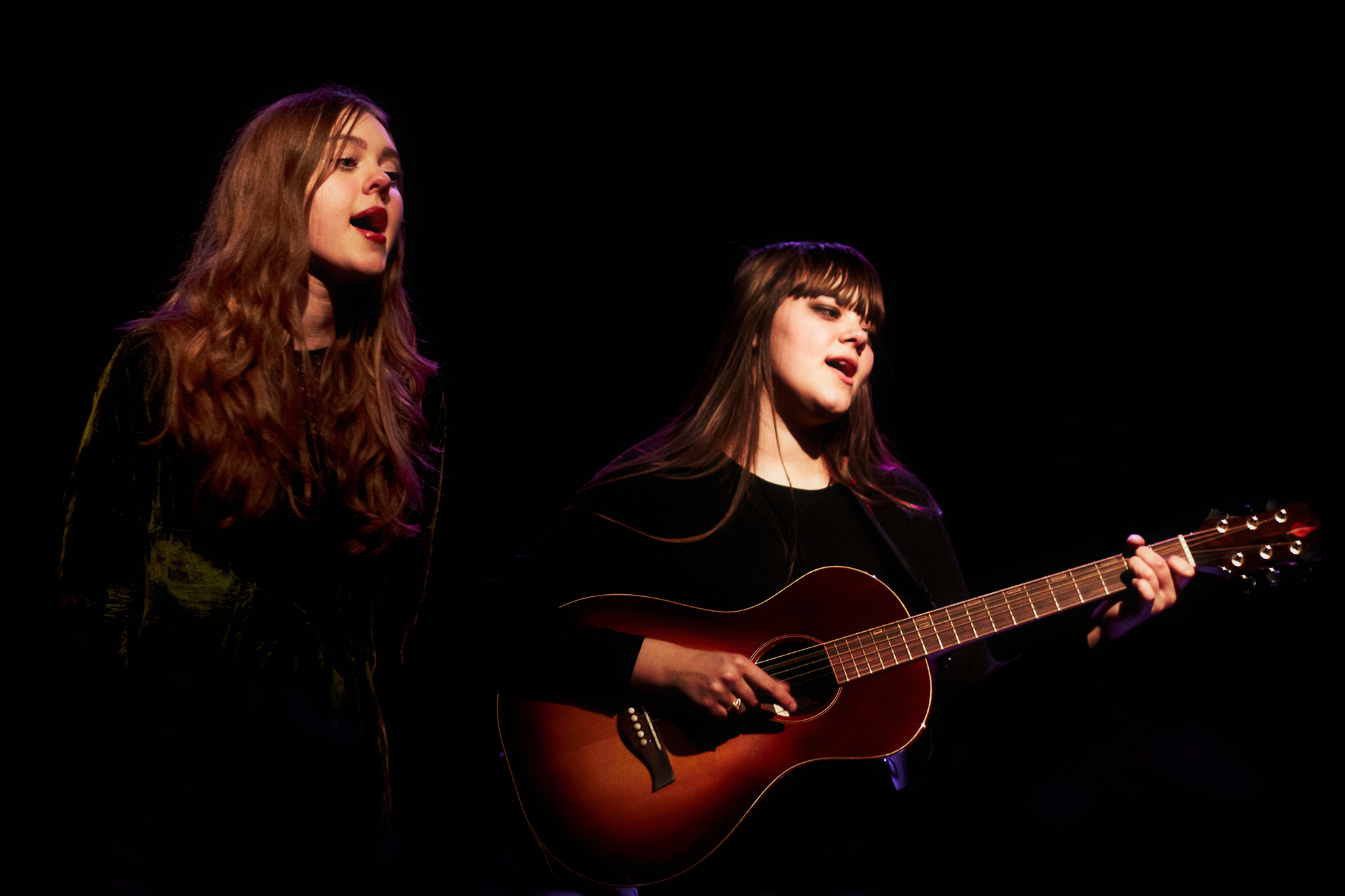
2013 winners First Aid Kit

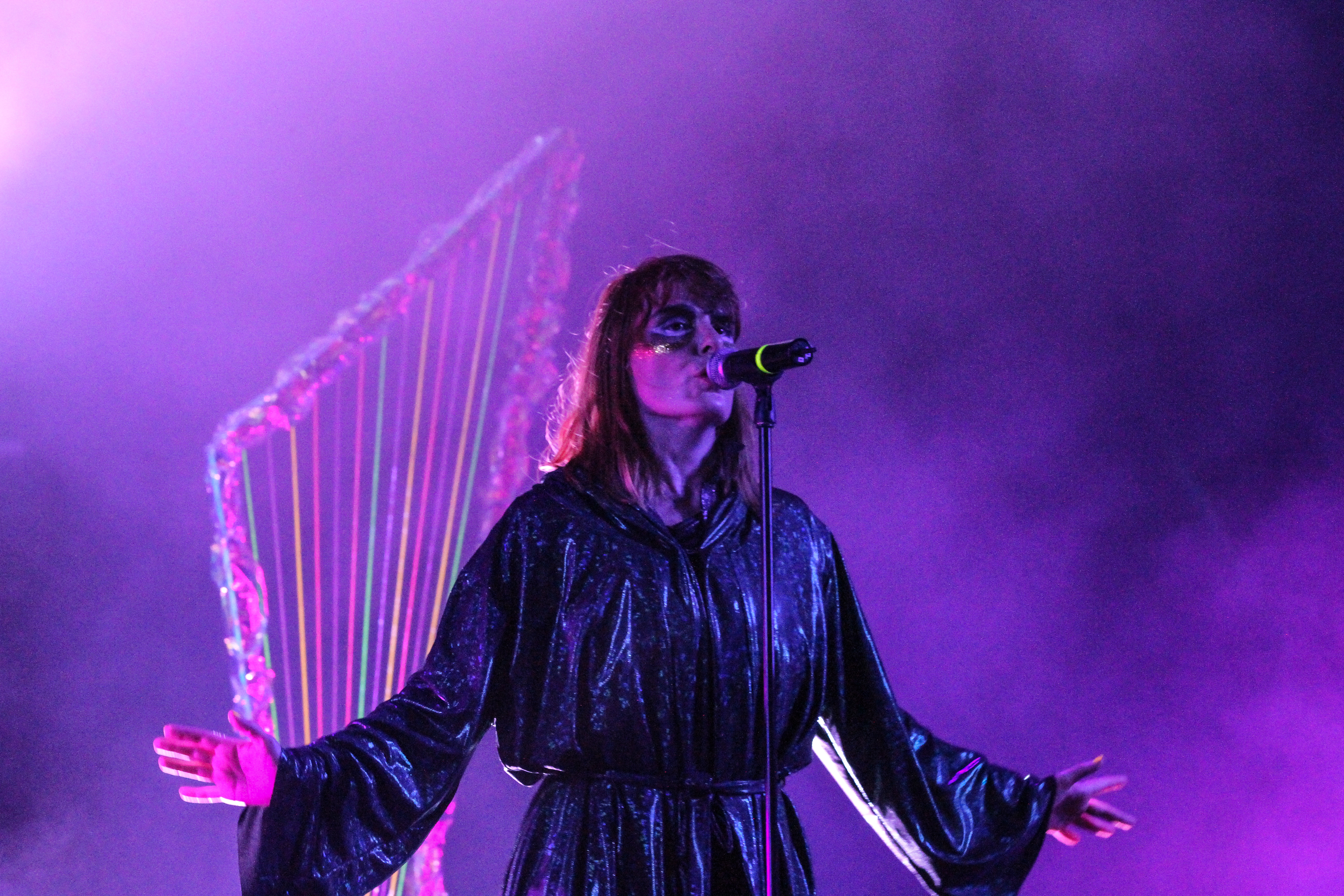
2014 winners The Knife

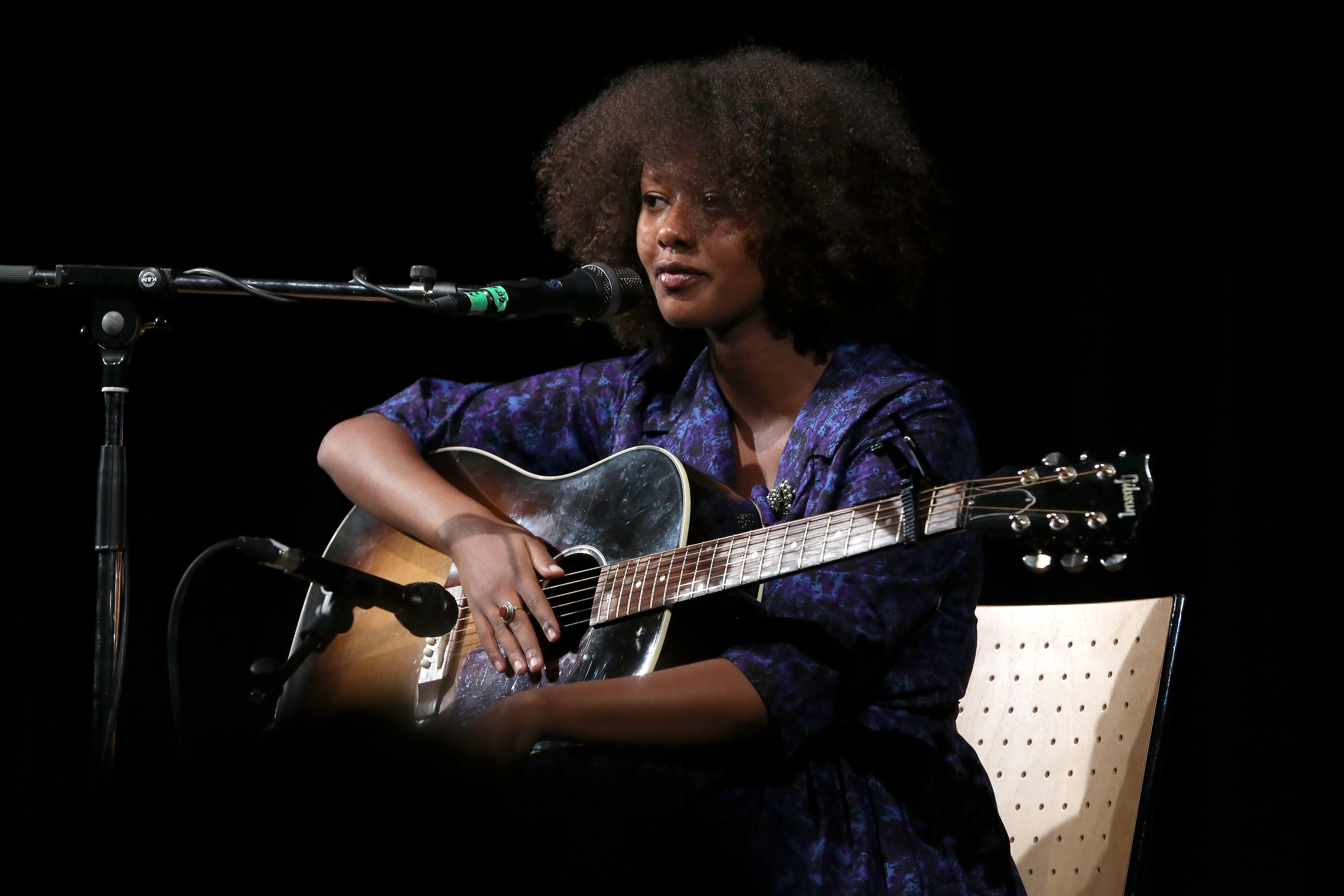
2015 winner Mirel Wagner

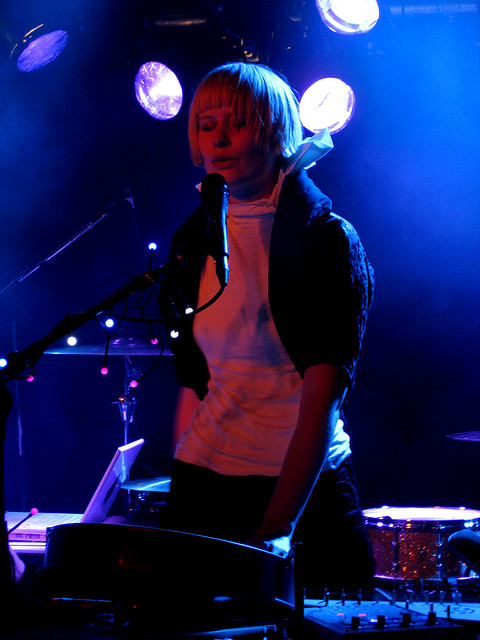
2017 winner Jenny Hval

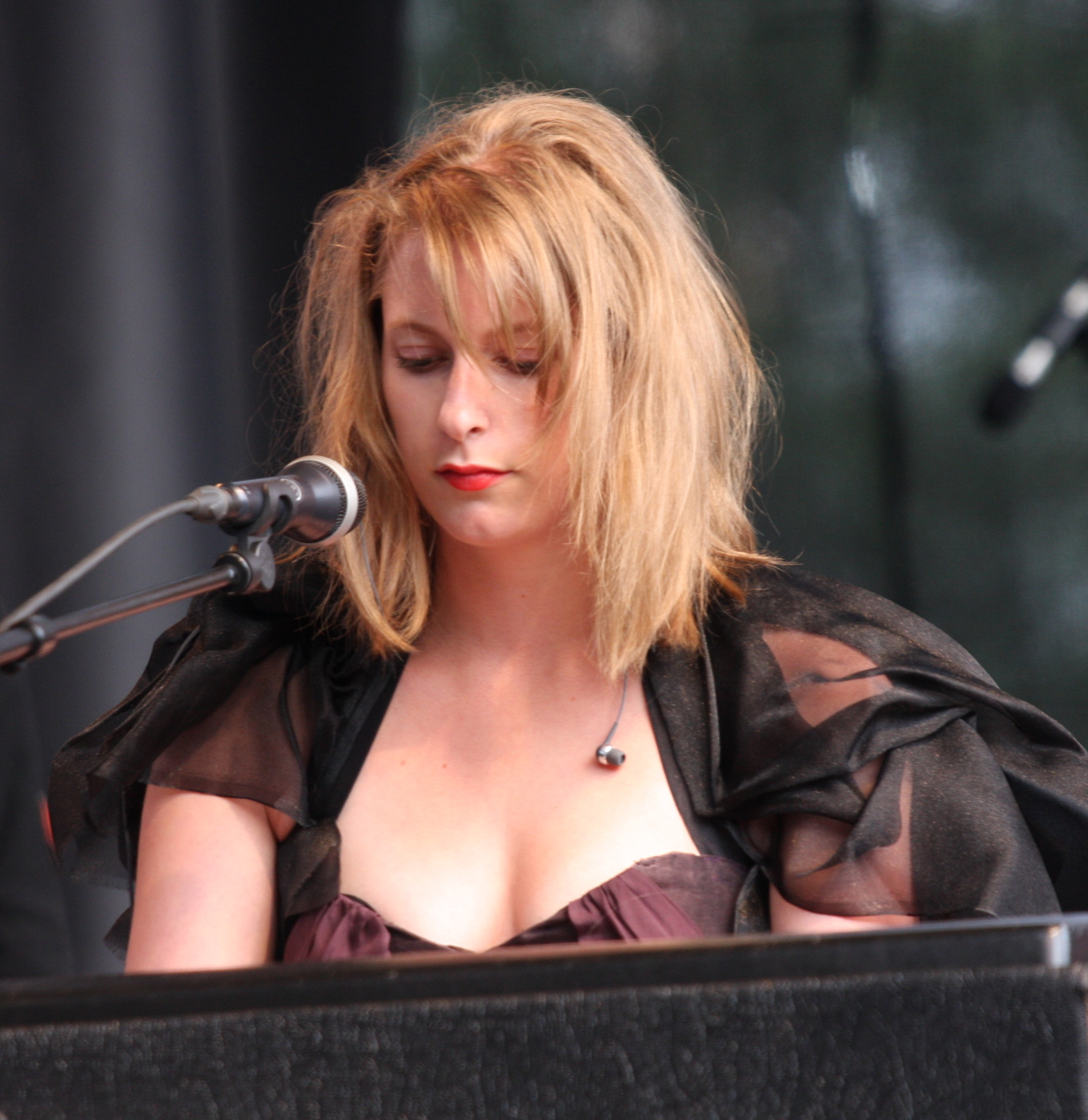
2018 winner Susanne Sundfør

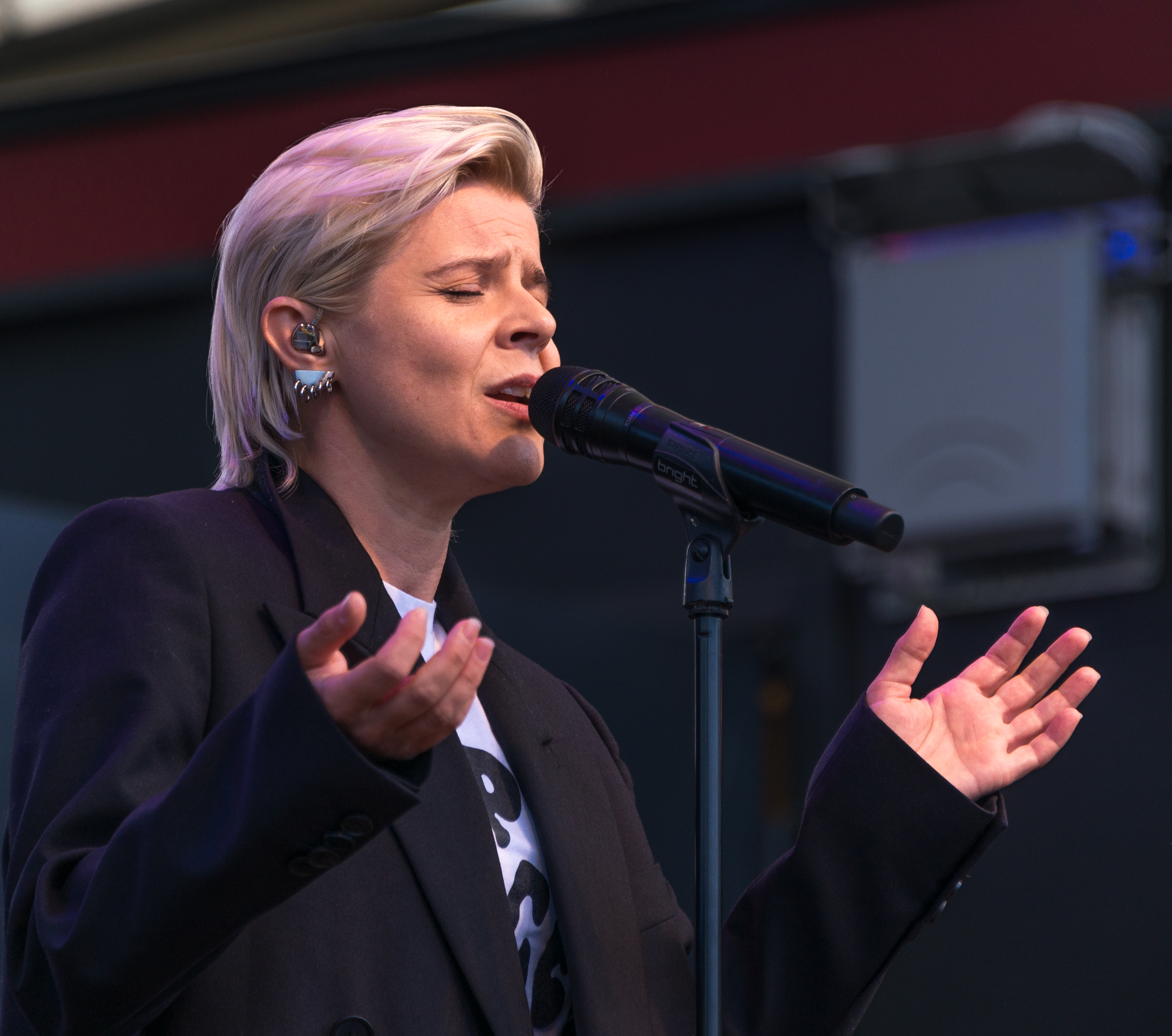
2019 winner Robyn

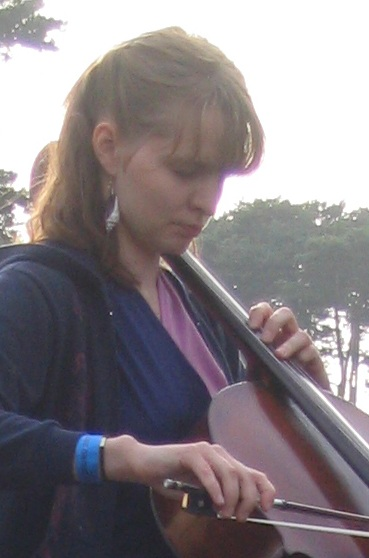
2020 winner Hildur Guðnadóttir

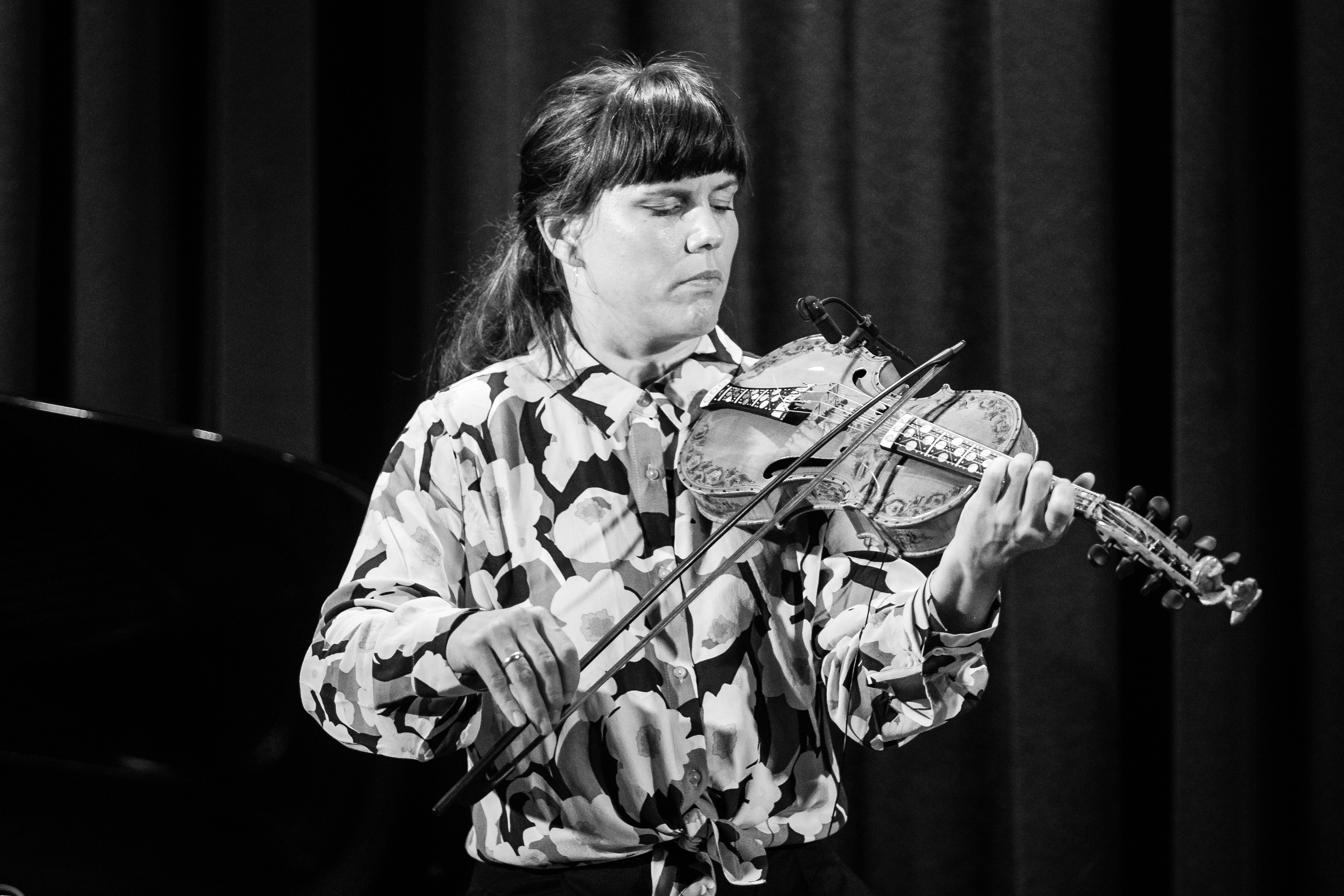
2022 winner Benedicte Maurseth

Year	Winner	Nominees	Ref(s)
2011	(Iceland) Jónsi - Go	(Sweden) Dungen – Skit i allt; (Finland) Paleface – Helsinki – Shangri-La; (Denmark) Frisk Frugt – Dansktoppen møder Burkina Faso i det himmelblå rum hvor solen bor, suite; (Norway) Susanne Sundfør – The Brothel; (Sweden) Robyn – Body Talk; (Denmark) Efterklang – Magic Chairs; (Norway) Serena-Maneesh – Serena Maneesh 2: Abyss in B Minor; (Sweden) The Radio Dept. – Clinging to a Scheme; (Iceland) Ólöf Arnalds – Innundir skinni; (Norway) Kvelertak – Kvelertak; (Sweden) First Aid Kit – The Big Black & The Blue	
2012	(Sweden) Goran Kajfeš – X/Y	(Norway) Ane Brun – It All Starts with One; (Sweden) Lykke Li – Wounded Rhymes; (Finland) Rubik – Solar; (Iceland) GusGus – Arabian Horse; (Denmark) Malk de Koijn – Toback to the Fromtime; (Finland) Siinai – Olympic Games; (Iceland) Björk – Biophilia; (Denmark) Iceage – New Brigade; (Norway) Montée – Renditions Of You; (Sweden) Anna Järvinen – Anna Själv Tredje; (Sweden) The Field – Looping State of Mind	
2013	(Sweden) First Aid Kit – The Lion's Roar	(Sweden) Anna von Hausswolff – Ceremony; (Iceland) Ásgeir Trausti – Dýrð í dauðaþögn; (Denmark) Choir of Young Believers – Rhine Gold; (Finland) Kerkko Koskinen Kollektiivi – Kerkko Koskinen Kollektiivi; (Norway) Lindstrøm – Smalhans; (Sweden) / (Norway) Neneh Cherry & The Thing – The Cherry Thing; (Finland) Pää Kii – Pää Kii; (Iceland) Retro Stefson – Retro Stefson; (Denmark) Selvhenter – Frk. B. Fricka; (Norway) Susanne Sundfør – The Silicone Veil; (Norway) Tønes – Sån av Salve	
2014	(Sweden) The Knife – Shaking the Habitual	(Norway) Atlanter – Vidde; (Finland) Death Hawks – Death Hawks; (Iceland) Hjaltalín – Enter 4; (Denmark) Iceage – You're Nothing; (Norway) Jenny Hval – Innocence Is Kinky; (Sweden) Jenny Wilson – Demand the Impossible!; (Finland) Minä ja Ville Ahonen – Mia; (Norway) Mona & Maria – My Sun; (Iceland) múm – Smilewound; (Denmark) / (Canada) Rhye – Woman; (Denmark) Synd og Skam – Lad Mig Falde Ind Til Dig / Center	
2015	(Finland) Mirel Wagner – When the Cellar Children See the Light of Day	(Norway) Emilie Nicolas – Emilie Nicolas; (Finland) Gracias – Elengi; (Denmark) Iceage – Plowing Into the Field of Love; (Sweden) Lorentz – Kärlekslåtar; (Sweden) Lykke Li – I Never Learn; (Sweden) Neneh Cherry – Blank Project; (Denmark) MØ – No Mythologies to Follow; (Iceland) Pink Street Boys – Trash From the Boys; (Iceland) Prins Póló – Sorri; (Denmark) Selvhenter – Motions of Large Bodies; (Norway) Todd Terje – It's Album Time	
2016	(Norway) Band of Gold – Band of Gold	(Iceland) Teitur Magnússon – 27; (Iceland) Björk – Vulnicura; (Denmark) Frisk Frugt – Den Europæiske Spejlbue; (Denmark) Myrkur – M; (Denmark) Danni Toma – Grå; (Norway) Ost & Kjex – Freedom Wig; (Norway) Jenny Hval – Apocalypse, girl; (Sweden) Seinabo Sey – Pretend; (Sweden) Anna von Hausswolff – The Miraculous; (Finland) Jaakko Eino Kalevi – Jaakko Eino Kalevi; (Finland) Pekko Käppi & K:H:H:L – Sanguis meus, mama!	
2017	(Norway) Jenny Hval – Blood Bitch	(Denmark) CTM – Suite for a Young Girl; (Denmark) Bisse – Højlandet; (Denmark) Værket – Jealousy Hits; (Iceland) Jóhann Jóhannsson – Arrival (Original Motion Picture Soundtrack); (Iceland) Skúli Sverrison, Hilmar Jensson, Arve Henriksen – Saumur; (Finland) Oranssi Pazuzu – Värähtelijä; (Finland) The Hearing – Adrian; (Finland) Mikko Joensuu – Amen 2; (Norway) Nosizwe – In Fragments; (Sweden) Kornél Kovács – The Bells; (Sweden) Cherrie – Sherihan	
2018	(Norway) Susanne Sundfør — Music for People in Trouble	(Denmark) Katinka — Vi er ikke kønne nok til at danse; (Denmark) Solbrud — Vemod; (Finland) Kaukolampi — 1; (Finland) Astrid Swan — From the Bed and Beyond; (Iceland) Björk — Utopia; (Iceland) Högni — Two Trains; (Iceland) Alvia Islandia — Elegant Hoe; (Norway) Kim Myhr — You / Me; (Sweden) Fever Ray — Plunge; (Sweden) Mwuana — Triller; (Sweden) Yung Lean — Stranger	
2019	(Sweden) Robyn — Honey	(Denmark) Astrid Sonne — Human Lines; (Denmark) Bisse — Tanmaurk; (Denmark) Soho Rezanejad — Six Archetypes; (Finland) Jori Hulkkonen — Simple Music for Complicated People; (Finland) Karina — Karina; (Iceland) GDRN — Hvað ef; (Iceland) GYDA — Evolution; (Norway) Lil Halima — Love Songs for Bad Lovers; (Norway) Marja Mortensson — Mojhtestasse; (Sweden) Jenny Wilson — Exorcism; (Sweden) Sarah Klang — Love in the Milky Way	
2020	(Iceland) Hildur Guðnadóttir — Chernobyl	(Denmark) Jada — I Cry A Lot; (Denmark) Lowly — Hifalutin; (Finland) Stinako — Ikuisuus; (Finland) The Hearing — Demian; (Iceland) Cell7 — Is Anybody Listening?; (Iceland) Countess Malaise — Hystería; (Norway) Erlend Apneseth Trio — Salika, Molika; (Norway) Karpe — SAS PLUS / SAS PUSSY; (Norway) Pom Poko — Birthday; (Sweden) Jenny Wilson — Trauma; (Sweden) Nadia Tehran — Dozakh: All lovers hell	
2021	(Denmark) Clarissa Connelly — The Voyager	(Iceland) Bára Gísladóttir/Skúli Sverrisson – Caeli; (Iceland) Ingibjörg Turchi – Meliae; (Sweden) Klara Keller – Hjärtansfröjd EP; (Sweden) Ane Brun – After the great storm; (Finland) Lau Nau – Själö – Original Soundtrack with Sound Environments By Janne Laine; (Finland) Oranssi Pazuzu – Mestarin kynsi; (Norway) girl in red – if i could make it go quiet; (Norway) Nekromantheon – The Visions of Trismegistos; (Norway) Musti – Qoyskayga; (Denmark) ML Buch – Skinned; (Denmark) Baby in Vain – See Through	
2022	(Norway) Benedicte Maurseth — Hárr	(Iceland) Sóley – Mother Melancholia; (Iceland) Gyða Valtýsdóttir – Ox; (Finland) Yeboyah – Perhosefekti; (Finland) Richard Dawson & Circle – Henki; (Finland) Sepikka – En kestä kylmää lailla ahvenen; (Denmark) Astrid Sonne – outside of your lifetime; (Denmark) / (Faroe Islands) Brimheim – can't hate myself into a different shape; (Norway) Bendik Giske – Cracks; (Norway) Jenny Hval – Classic Objects; (Sweden) Maja Francis – A Soft Pink Mess; (Sweden) David Ritschard – Blåbärskungen	

== See also ==
- Polar Music Prize (Sweden)
- Mercury Prize (UK)
- Choice Music Prize (Ireland)
- Polaris Music Prize (Canada)
- Prix Constantin (France)
- Shortlist Music Prize (United States)
- Australian Music Prize (Australia)
