= The Practice of Love (album) =

Studio album by Jenny Hval
- Released: 13 September 2019
- Genres: Electropop; trance; darkwave
- Length: 33:50
- Label: Sacred Bones
- Producers: Jenny Hval; Lasse Marhaug

Jenny Hval chronology
| Blood Bitch (2016) | The Practice of Love (2019) | Classic Objects (2022) |

Singles from The Practice of Love
- 1. "Ashes to Ashes" Released: 10 July 2019; 2. "High Alice" Released: 13 August 2019; 3. "Accident" Released: 9 September 2019

The Practice of Love is the seventh studio album by Norwegian musician Jenny Hval, released 13 September 2019 on Sacred Bones Records. The album was produced by Hval, with co-production by Lasse Marhaug and features guest vocals from Vivian Wang, formerly of the psych rock band The Observatory, Australian singer-songwriter Laura Jean, and French experimental musician Félicia Atkinson.

The album's title was partially inspired by Valie Export's 1985 film of the same name.

== Recording ==
The Practice of Love was written, performed, arranged and recorded in Oslo. Vivian Wang recorded in her bedroom, on her bed, in Singapore following brain surgery. Laura Jean Englert recorded in Sydney. Félicia Atkinson recorded at home between summer and fall 2018 with "little I".

== Writing and composition ==
The album was written and produced by Hval after she completed writing a novel, titled Girls Against God, which was released in October 2020. The album was inspired by 1990s trance music and has been described as more accessible than Hval's previous work. In an interview for The Ringer, Hval explained, "I wanted to have some kind of clarity in the sound, not to make things muddy and deep, but to have things very light and clear, almost like the element of the transcendental in trance. It's sort of an elevated state, a very receptive state, I find. I can write things that wouldn't happen with other sounds."

== Critical reception ==
Professional ratings
Aggregate scores
| Source | Rating |
|---|---|
| AnyDecentMusic? | 8.1/10 |
| Metacritic | 84/100 |
Review scores
| Source | Rating |
| AllMusic | 4/5 stars |
| Exclaim! | 8/10 |
| The Independent | 4/5 stars |
| The Irish Times | 4/5 stars |
| The Line of Best Fit | 8.5/10 |
| Mojo | 4/5 stars |
| The Observer | 3/5 stars |
| Pitchfork | 8.6/10 |
| Q | 4/5 stars |
| Uncut | 8/10 |

At Metacritic, which assigns a normalized rating out of 100 to reviews from mainstream publications, The Practice of Love received an average score of 84, based on 16 reviews, indicating "universal acclaim".

Heather Phares of AllMusic gave the album a favourable review, writing, "It may be her subtlest, most approachable album yet; though its ideas are just as complex and provocative as those of Blood Bitch or Apocalypse, girl, there's something welcoming about it that engages the hearts and minds of her listeners fully."

=== Accolades ===
Year-end lists for The Practice of Love
| Publication | List | Rank | Ref. |
|---|---|---|---|
| The A.V. Club | The 20 Best Albums of 2019 | 2 | |
| The Guardian | The 50 Best Albums of 2019 | 29 | |
| Pitchfork | The 50 Best Albums of 2019 | 20 | |
| Slant Magazine | The 25 Best Albums of 2019 | 10 | |
| Stereogum | The 50 Best Albums of 2019 | 16 | |

== Track listing ==
All tracks are written by Jenny Hval.

| No. | Title | Length |
|---|---|---|
| 1. | "Lions" (featuring Vivian Wang) | 3:57 |
| 2. | "High Alice" | 4:46 |
| 3. | "Accident" (featuring Laura Jean) | 4:10 |
| 4. | "The Practice of Love" (featuring Laura Jean and Vivian Wang) | 3:03 |
| 5. | "Ashes to Ashes" | 4:15 |
| 6. | "Thumbsucker" (featuring Félicia Atkinson) | 4:15 |
| 7. | "Six Red Cannas" (featuring Vivian Wang, Félicia Atkinson, and Laura Jean) | 4:07 |
| 8. | "Ordinary" (featuring Vivian Wang and Félicia Atkinson) | 5:17 |

== Personnel ==
Credits adapted from the liner notes of The Practice of Love.

- Jenny Hval – vocals, background vocals, composer, arranger, instruments, production, programming (all tracks), concept, recording
- Lasse Marhaug – co-production, mixing (track 8), recording (additional tracks), electronics, art direction
- Laura Jean Englert – additional lyrics, vocals, voice (tracks 3, 4, 5), recording
- Vivian Wang – vocals (tracks 1, 4, 5, 8), recording
- Félicia Atkinson – vocals (tracks 3, 5, 8), recording
- Anja Lauvdal – synths (tracks 1, 2)
- Espen Reinertsen – saxophone (tracks 2, 3, 6)
- Chris Elms – mixing (tracks 1–3, 5–7)
- Kyrre Laastad – mixing (track 4)
- Heba Kadry – mastering
- Esra Røise – artwork
