= Ásgeir Trausti =

Icelandic singer and musician (born 1992)

Ásgeir
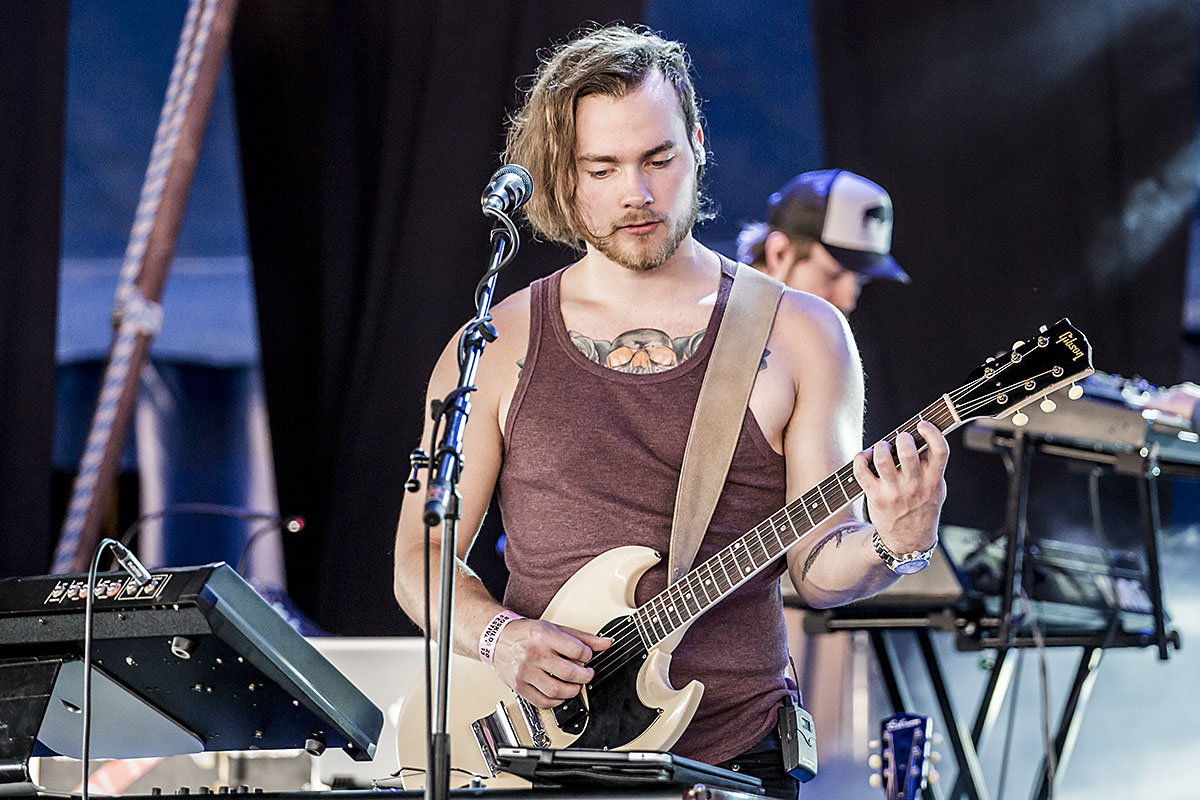
- Ásgeir performing in 2013

Background information
- Also known as: Ásgeir Trausti
- Born: Ásgeir Trausti Einarsson; 1 July 1992 (age 34); Laugarbakki, Iceland
- Origin: Reykjavík, Iceland
- Genre: Folktronica
- Occupations: Singer; songwriter; musician
- Instruments: Vocals; guitar; piano
- Years active: 2012–present
- Labels: One Little Indian; Sena; Inertia
- Website: asgeirmusic.com

Ásgeir Trausti Einarsson (Icelandic pronunciation: [ˈauːsceir̥ ˈtʰrœystɪ ˈeiːnar̥sɔn]; born 1 July 1992) is an Icelandic singer-songwriter and musician. On his Icelandic releases, he was credited as Ásgeir Trausti. In 2013, he started using the mononym Ásgeir. He is backed by the Ásgeir Trausti Band and also plays guitar in the Lovely Lion.

== Career ==
Ásgeir's debut album, Dýrð í dauðaþögn, was released in 2012 on One Little Indian Records. The lead single, "Sumargestur", made it to number two on the Tónlist, an unofficial but widely quoted Icelandic singles chart. It was followed by "Leyndarmál", which spent six weeks at number one on Tónlist, and the title track—three weeks at number one.

He had a Christmas hit with the song "Hvítir skór", in collaboration with BlazRoca, which stayed at the top of the Icelandic singles chart for nine consecutive weeks, from December 2012 to the end of January 2013.

An English-language version of Dýrð í dauðaþögn, titled In the Silence, came out in October 2013. The American singer John Grant helped with the translation and later appeared in the video for the song "King and Cross".

Ásgeir's second English-language album, Afterglow, came out in 2017 and spawned the singles "Unbound", "Stardust", and "Afterglow". The deluxe edition included a cover of Pixies' "Where Is My Mind?"

In 2019, Ásgeir released the single "Youth", from his third album, Bury the Moon, which came out in February 2020. Its Icelandic counterpart, Sátt, was issued on the same day.

In September 2021, he released the four-track EP The Sky Is Painted Gray Today. In October 2022, he published his fourth studio album, Time on My Hands, preceded by the single "Snowblind" in July.

Ásgeir's fifth album, Julia, came out in February 2026, with a deluxe version being released in September.

== Discography ==
=== Studio albums ===
List of albums, with selected chart positions, sales figures and certifications
Title	Album details	Peak chart positions								Certifications
Title	Album details	ICL	AUS	BEL (FL)	BEL (WA)	DEN	FRA	NLD	UK	Certifications
Dýrð í dauðaþögn	Released: September 2012; Language: Icelandic; Label: Sena	1	—	—	—	34	—	—	—	ISL: 4× Platinum
In the Silence (English version of Dýrð í dauðaþögn)	Released: 27 January 2014; Language: English; Label: One Little Indian	2	8	42	102	—	32	36	40	
Afterglow	Released: 5 May 2017; Language: English (The track "Hold" is in Icelandic)	—	22	68	120	—	103	58	—	
Bury the Moon / Sátt	Released: 7 February 2020; Language: English, Icelandic; Label: One Little Indian	—	88	162	—	—	118	—	—	
Time on My Hands	Released: 28 October 2022; Language: English; Label: One Little Independent	—	—	—	—	—	—	—	—	
Time on My Hands (Lo-Fi Version)	Released: 8 September 2023; Language: English; Label: One Little Independent	—	—	—	—	—	—	—	—	
Julia	Released: 13 February 2026; Language: English; Label: One Little Independent	—	—	—	—	—	—	—	—	

=== EPs ===
List of EPs, with selected details
Title	EP details	Track listing
The Toerag Sessions (Live Acoustic)	Released: 14 May 2013; Recorded: February 2013; Language: English; Format: Free download; All tracks included on the album In the Silence (Deluxe Edition)	1. "Going Home" (4:41); 2. "On That Day" (4:13); 3. "Summer Guest" (3:51)
Spotify Live	All tracks recorded live at Spotify, London; Released: 19 May 2017; Label: One Little Independent	1. "Unbound" (3:57); 2. "Dreaming" (4:37); 3. "Going Home" (4:25); 4. "I Should Live in Salt" (4:12); 5. "Stardust" (3:28)
The Sky Is Painted Gray Today	Released: 3 September 2021; Language: English; Label: One Little Independent	1. "The Sky Is Painted Gray Today" (3:41); 2. "Sister" (3:22); 3. "On the Edge" (4:07); 4. "Sunday Drive" (3:42)
Borderland	Released: 4 October 2022; Language: English; Label: One Little Independent	1. "Borderland" (3:23); 2. "Like I Am" (5:01); 3. "Limitless" (3:37); 4. "Snowblind" (3:58)
Against the Current	Released: 14 January 2026; Language: English; Label: One Little Independent	1. "Against the Current" (3:36); 2. "Sugar Clouds" (4:28); 3. "Smoke" (3:21); 4. "Ferris Wheel" (3:25)

=== Singles ===
==== As lead artist ====
List of singles, with selected peak chart positions
Title	Year	Peak chart positions				Album
Title	Year	ICL	AUS	FRA	JPN	Album
"Sumargestur"*	2012	2	—	—	—	Dýrð í dauðaþögn
"Leyndarmál"*	2012	1	—	—	—	Dýrð í dauðaþögn
"Dýrð í dauðaþögn"*	2012	1	—	—	—	Dýrð í dauðaþögn
"Nýfallið regn"*	2013	5	—	—	—	Dýrð í dauðaþögn
"Hærra"*	2013	7	—	—	—	Dýrð í dauðaþögn
"Heimförin"*	2013	14	—	—	—	Dýrð í dauðaþögn
"King and Cross"	2013	—	77	107	13	In the Silence
"Going Home"	2013	—	—	167	—	In the Silence
"Torrent"	2013	—	—	—	—	In the Silence
"Heart-Shaped Box"	2014	—	—	—	—	Non-album singles
"Frá mér til ykkar"*	2014	1	—	—	—	Non-album singles
"Stormurinn"*	2014	1	—	—	—	In the Silence (Deluxe)
"Unbound"	2017	—	—	—	—	Afterglow
"Stardust"	2017	—	—	—	—	Afterglow
"I Know You Know"	2017	—	—	—	—	Afterglow
"Lifandi Vatnið (The Day After Session)"	2018	—	—	—	—	Bury the Moon / Sátt
"Youth"	2019	—	—	—	—	Bury the Moon / Sátt
"Bernskan"*	2019	—	—	—	—	Bury the Moon / Sátt
"Lazy Giants"	2019	—	—	—	—	Bury the Moon / Sátt
"Pictures"	2020	—	—	—	—	Bury the Moon / Sátt
"Sunday Drive"	2021	—	—	—	—	The Sky Is Painted Grey Today
"Sister"	2021	—	—	—	—	The Sky Is Painted Grey Today
"Snowblind"	2022	—	—	—	—	Time on My Hands
"Borderland"	2022	—	—	—	—	Time on My Hands
"Dans nos rêves" (live at Hljóðriti; featuring Clou)	2023	—	—	—	—	Non-album single
"Vibrating Walls" (Superorganism Remix)	2023	—	—	—	—	Time on My Hands
"Golden Hour" (Lo-Fi Version)	2023	—	—	—	—	Time on My Hands (Lo-Fi Version)

* denotes Iceland-only releases. All positions are on Tónlist, an unofficial Icelandic Singles Chart, but are indicative of relevant popularity and chart success

==== As featured artist ====
- "Hvítir skór" (BlazRoca and Ásgeir Trausti) (from the album BlazRoca, 2016)
- "New Wonder" and "Chasms" (Alex Banks feat. Ásgeir) (from the album Beneath the Surface, 2019)
- "Only Love" (Eivør feat. Ásgeir, 2020)
- "Till It Hits Me" (DSTRCT feat. Ásgeir, 2023)
- "Dimmuborgir" (Eydís Evensen feat. Ásgeir) (from the album Oceanic Mirror, 2025)

== Videography ==
- 2013: "King and Cross" (written, filmed, and directed by Arni & Kinski)
- 2013: "Torrent" (directed by Jónatan Grétarsson)

== Awards and nominations ==
Year	Organization	Award	Work	Result
2012	Icelandic Music Awards	Album of the Year	Dýrð í dauðaþögn	Won
2012	Icelandic Music Awards	Best Newcomer (Pop, rock & blues)	Ásgeir Trausti	Won
2012	Icelandic Music Awards	Public Choice Award	Ásgeir Trausti	Won
2012	Icelandic Music Awards	Icelandicmusic.com's Online Achievement Award	Ásgeir Trausti	Won
2012	Icelandic Music Awards	Songwriter of the Year (Pop & Rock)	Dýrð í dauðaþögn	Nominated
2012	Icelandic Music Awards	Male Vocalist of the Year (Pop, Rock, Jazz & Blues)	Dýrð í dauðaþögn	Nominated
2012	Kraumur Awards	Kraumur Award 2012	Dýrð í dauðaþögn	Won
2013	Nordic Music Prize	Best Nordic Album of the Year, 2012	Dýrð í dauðaþögn	Nominated
2014	European Commission	European Border Breakers Award	Ásgeir	Won
