= Iris Silver Mist =

Studio album by Jenny Hval
- Released: 2 May 2025
- Genre: Experimental; art pop
- Length: 42:44
- Label: 4AD
- Producer: Jenny Hval; Kyrre Laastad

Jenny Hval chronology
Classic Objects (2022)	Iris Silver Mist (2025)

Singles from Iris Silver Mist
- 1. "To Be A Rose" Released: 25 February 2025; 2. "The Artist Is absent" Released: 1 April 2025; 3. "Lay Down" Released: 29 April 2025

Iris Silver Mist is the ninth solo studio album by Norwegian musician Jenny Hval, released 2 May 2025 on 4AD. Musically, Iris Silver Mist is as an experimental and art pop recording. Iris Silver Mist is named after a fragrance created by perfumer Maurice Roucel for the French brand Serge Lutens.

== Background ==
During the early months of the 2020 COVID-19 pandemic, Norwegian musician Jenny Hval revisited a teenage fascination with perfume. This sensory interest gradually evolved into a new creative framework, as scent became a substitute for the intimacy and immediacy of live music. Central to this shift was the fragrance Iris Silver Mist by Maurice Roucel for the French perfume house Serge Lutens. Hval described the scent as evoking the sensation of being "close to ghosts", and its themes of transformation and ephemeral presence would later inform the album that took its name. Hval announced their ninth album, Iris Silver Mist. Many of the tracks on Iris Silver Mist were initially introduced during Hval's 2024 live performance series I Want To Be a Machine.

== Musical style ==
Musically, Iris Silver Mist is as an experimental and art pop recording that address themes such as isolation, memories and dislocation. Hval's vocal delivery is highly dynamic and often processed or manipulated to create dreamlike or "indecipherable" effects; critic John Murphy noted moments where her timbre resembled that of American singer Julee Cruise. The album blends spoken word passages, fragmented poetry, layered choruses and varied vocal techniques, ranging from hushed whispers and monotone recitations to falsetto and nonverbal sounds.

The album leans heavily on synthesizers, often evoking retro or cinematic textures reminiscent of Angelo Badalamenti's film scores. These elements are supported by ambient field recordings and environmental sounds, including sounds of the Oslo subway, birdsong, zippers, footsteps on gravel, vintage TV show buzzers and cat purrs. Percussion is equally varied, featuring "skeletal percussion", breakbeats, tambourines, and hand drums. Additional instrumentation includes brass, stringed instruments, fingerpicked guitar and organ. Arrangements will often shift shape across a single track. Songs frequently evolve from one form to another or dissolve abruptly, reflecting the record's interest in transience and transformation.

== Reception ==
Professional ratings
Aggregate scores
Source	Rating
AnyDecentMusic?	8.0/10
Metacritic	84/100
Review scores
Source	Rating
AllMusic	4/5 stars
The Arts Desk	3/5 stars
The Guardian	5/5 stars
Mojo	4/5 stars
MusicOMH	4/5 stars
Paste	8.2/10
Pitchfork	8.0/10
Uncut	8/10

Iris Silver Mist has received acclaim from critics. At the review aggregator Metacritic, which assigns a weighted average rating out of 100 to reviews from mainstream critics, Iris Silver Mist received a rating of 84 out of 100 based on twelve critic reviews, indicating "universal acclaim".

== Track listing ==
All tracks are written by Jenny Hval.

Iris Silver Mist
No.	Title	Length
1.	"Lay Down"	4:16
2.	"To Be a Rose"	3:53
3.	"I Want to Start at the Beginning"	2:26
4.	"All Night Long"	6:01
5.	"Heiner Müller"	0:59
6.	"You Died"	3:31
7.	"Spirit Mist"	1:53
8.	"I Don't Know What Free Is"	4:46
9.	"The Artist Is Absent"	1:23
10.	"Huffing My Arm"	1:27
11.	"The Gift"	2:37
12.	"A Ballad"	3:45
13.	"I Want the End to Sound Like This"	5:42
Total length:		42:44

== Personnel ==
Credits adapted from the album's liner notes.

- Jenny Hval – production, recording, vocals, arrangements, keyboards, guitars
- Håvard Volden – production, recording, guitars, bass, keyboards
- Kyrre Laastad – mixing, recording, percussion on "To Be a Rose"
- Håvard Skaset – recording
- Heba Kadry – mastering
- Christian Næss – drums, percussion, drum edits
- Lasse Marhaug – cover design
- Charlie Selvig – cover photo, illustration, art direction
- Pauline Naerholm – make-up
- Andrés Kløvstad – hair

== Charts ==
Chart performance for Iris Silver Mist
Chart (2025)	Peak position
UK Album Downloads (OCC)	50
UK Independent Albums (OCC)	29
