= The Practice of Love =

The Practice of Love may refer to:

- The Practice of Love (film), a 1985 West German-Austrian drama film
- The Practice of Love (album), a 2019 album by Jenny Hval
