= Bury the Moon =

English: Bury the Moon Icelandic: Sátt
- Bury the Moon cover. The artwork for Sátt is a black-and-white version of the same image

Studio album by Ásgeir
- Released: 7 February 2020
- Recorded: Hljóðriti Studios, Hafnarfjörður, Iceland; SkolHaus, Sweden
- Genre: Indie folk; folktronica
- Length: 42:07
- Language: English; Icelandic
- Label: One Little Indian
- Producer: Guðmundur Kristinn Jónsson; Ásgeir

Ásgeir chronology
Afterglow (2017)	English: Bury the Moon; Icelandic: Sátt (2020)	Time on My Hands (2022)

Bury the Moon is the English-language version of the fourth studio album by Icelandic singer-songwriter Ásgeir, released on 7 February 2020 through One Little Indian Records. The Icelandic version, titled Sátt, was released a week earlier, on 31 January 2020. The albums were issued both separately and packaged together. The project received average reviews from critics, with Bury the Moon charting across Europe and in Australia.

== Critical reception ==
Professional ratings
Review scores
Source	Rating
Evening Standard	3/5 stars
The Music	3/5 stars
MusicOMH	4/5 stars

Double J described the album as "quiet, intelligently crafted and beautifully executed indie folk". Nick Smith of MusicOMH found it to be "more of a return to the folky and atmospheric sonic blueprint of his debut" as well as "an ambiently powerful and a brilliantly immersive album".

The Music's Guido Farnell opined that while Bury the Moon is "another accomplished album with plenty of depth from a talent who aims to reward his listeners" and "a very heartfelt affair", he felt that "wallowing in this much emotion does at times leave us wishing Ásgeir would break out a few party tunes". Harry Fletcher, reviewing the album for the Evening Standard, called it "an album of introspective, emotive folktronica" and compared the album to the works of James Blake, James Vincent McMorrow and Bon Iver, calling this sound "the album's weakness as well as its strength" as "there's little to differentiate it from the influx of sensitive folktronica over recent years". He concluded that it "isn't the album to make Ásgeir stand out from the crowd".

== Track listing ==
Bury the Moon track listing
No.	Title	Length
1.	"Pictures"	3:58
2.	"Youth"	3:30
3.	"Breathe"	3:15
4.	"Eventide"	3:47
5.	"Lazy Giants"	3:41
6.	"Overlay"	2:53
7.	"Rattled Snow"	3:38
8.	"Turn Gold to Sand"	4:07
9.	"Living Water"	4:33
10.	"Until Daybreak"	4:23
11.	"Bury the Moon"	4:24
Total length:		42:07

Sátt track listing
No.	Title	Length
1.	"Myndir"	3:58
2.	"Bernskan"	3:30
3.	"Heimþrá"	3:15
4.	"Minning"	3:47
5.	"Upp úr moldinni"	3:41
6.	"Andann dregur"	2:53
7.	"Glæður"	3:38
8.	"Sátt"	4:07
9.	"Lifandi vatnið"	4:33
10.	"Hringsól"	4:23
11.	"Vaðandi þurrt"	4:26
Total length:		42:09

== Charts ==
=== Weekly charts ===
Weekly chart performance for Sátt / Bury the Moon
Chart (2020)	Peak position
Australian Albums (ARIA)	88
Belgian Albums (Ultratop Flanders)	162
French Albums (SNEP)	118
German Albums (Offizielle Top 100)	89
Icelandic Albums (Tónlistinn)	1
Swiss Albums (Schweizer Hitparade)	39

=== Year-end charts ===
2020 year-end charts for Sátt / Bury the Moon
Chart (2020)	Position
Icelandic Albums (Tónlistinn)	7

2021 year-end charts for Sátt
Chart (2021)	Position
Icelandic Albums (Tónlistinn)	41

2022 year-end charts for Sátt
Chart (2022)	Position
Icelandic Albums (Tónlistinn)	92
