= Classic Objects =

Studio album by Jenny Hval
- Released: 11 March 2022
- Studio: Øra Studio (Trondheim)
- Genre: Experimental; art pop
- Length: 42:28
- Label: 4AD; Su Tissue
- Producer: Jenny Hval; Kyrre Laastad

Jenny Hval chronology
The Practice of Love (2019)	Classic Objects (2022)	Iris Silver Mist (2025)

Singles from Classic Objects
- 1. "Jupiter" Released: 9 November 2021; 2. "Year of Love" Released: 18 January 2022; 3. "Freedom" Released: 7 March 2022

Classic Objects is the eighth solo studio album by Norwegian musician Jenny Hval, released 11 March 2022 on 4AD. The album was produced by Hval, with co-production by Kyrre Laastad.

== Recording ==
Classic Objects was written, performed, arranged, and recorded in Øra Studio in Trondheim.

== Critical reception ==
Professional ratings
Aggregate scores
Source	Rating
Metacritic	85/100
Review scores
Source	Rating
AllMusic	4/5 stars
Clash	8/10
DIY	4.5/5 stars
Exclaim!	8/10
The New York Times	8/10
Pitchfork	8.0/10
The Skinny	5/5 stars

Classic Objects received widespread acclaim from music critics. At Metacritic, which assigns a normalized rating out of 100 to reviews from mainstream critics, the album received an average score of 85 based on 11 reviews, indicating "universal acclaim".

Heather Phares of AllMusic commented that "Her songwriting feels particularly immersive this time around, and filled with writerly detail that makes the ordinary feel extraordinary." Kaelen Bell of Exclaim! stated, "Warm, loose and occupied by the realities of creative work and the contradictory comfort of our 'normcore institutions,' it manages to be Hval's most accessible record yet." Allison Hussey of Pitchfork called the album "her most unified mind-body work to date." Lewis Wade of The Skinny stated, "This is untethered, uncluttered music, made with real heart by an artist at her peak."

=== Accolades ===
Publication	Accolade	Rank	Ref.
The Fader	The 50 Best Albums of 2022	15	
The Guardian	The 50 Best Albums of 2022	28	
Pitchfork	The 50 Best Albums of 2022	40	
PopMatters	The 80 Best Albums of 2022	59	
Slant	The 50 Best Albums of 2022	50	

== Track listing ==
All tracks are written by Jenny Hval.

Classic Objects track listing
No.	Title	Length
1.	"Year of Love"	4:13
2.	"American Coffee"	6:02
3.	"Classic Objects"	4:49
4.	"Cemetery of Splendour"	7:01
5.	"Year of Sky"	5:20
6.	"Jupiter"	7:55
7.	"Freedom"	2:16
8.	"The Revolution Will Not Be Owned"	4:49
Total length:		42:28

== Personnel ==
Credits adapted from the liner notes of Classic Objects.

- Jenny Hval – vocals, background vocals, composer, arranger, instruments, production, programming (all tracks), concept, recording
- Kyrre Laastad – co-production, guitar (tracks 1, 7), bass guitar (tracks 2, 6, 8), keyboards (track 1), drums (track 4, 6), recording
- Håvard Volden – guitar (tracks 1–3, 7, 8), bass guitar (tracks 3, 4), keyboards (tracks 5–7)
- Vivian Wang – additional vocals (track 6), keyboards (track 3), recording
- Natali Abrahamsen Garner – additional vocals (tracks 2, 6, 8), recording
- Johan Lindvall – keyboards, piano (track 8)
- Daniel Meyer Grønvold – guitar (tracks 1–4, 7, 8)
- Hans Hulbækmo – percussion (tracks 1–6, 8), drums (track 6, 8)
- Annie Bielski – additional lyrics, artwork, concept, photography
- Even Ormestad – recording (track 8)
- Lasse Marhaug – graphic design, photography
- Heba Kadry – mixing, mastering

== Charts ==
Chart performance for Classic Objects
Chart (2022)	Peak position
Scottish Albums (OCC)	70
UK Album Downloads (OCC)	61
UK Independent Albums (OCC)	20
