= Menneskekollektivet =

Studio album by Lost Girls
- Released: 26 March 2021
- Studio: Øra Studios (Trondheim, Norway)
- Genre: Dance; electronic
- Length: 44:14
- Label: Smalltown Supersound
- Producer: Lost Girls; Kyrre Laastad

Lost Girls chronology
Feeling EP (2018)	Menneskekollektivet (2021)	Selvutsletter (2023)

Menneskekollektivet is the debut album by the Norwegian art pop duo Lost Girls, musicians Jenny Hval and Håvard Volden. It was released in March 2021 by Norwegian record label Smalltown Supersound.

== Composition ==
While the duo's 2018 EP Feeling worked in art punk, Menneskekollektivet is "primarily a dance record" and pushes further into Hval's "electronic explorations".

== Critical reception ==
Professional ratings
Aggregate scores
Source	Rating
Metacritic	83/100
Review scores
Source	Rating
AllMusic	4/5 stars
Beats Per Minute	81%
Mojo	4/5 stars
Pitchfork	8.4/10
Uncut	8/10

Menneskekollektivet was welcomed with positive reviews upon its release. On Metacritic, it holds a score of 83 out of 100, indicating "universal acclaim", based on six reviews.

Sophie Kemp for Pitchfork called it "a warm-blooded exploration of the sensuality of the artistic process" and "as conceptually rich as anything Hval has ever done." It was given the website's "Best New Music" designation.

=== Accolades ===
Menneskekollektivet on year-end lists
Publication	List	Rank	Ref.
Pitchfork	The 50 Best Albums of 2021	36	

== Track listing ==
No.	Title	Length
1.	"Menneskekollektivet"	12:10
2.	"Losing Something"	4:16
3.	"Carried by Invisible Bodies"	6:15
4.	"Love, Lovers"	15:30
5.	"Real Life"	6:03
