= Mirel Wagner (album) =

Studio album by Mirel Wagner
- Released: February 23, 2011
- Recorded: Kick Out The Jams!, Helsinki
- Genre: Blues, folk
- Length: 30:33
- Label: Kioski, Bone Voyage Records, Friendly Fire Recordings
- Producer: Jürgen Hendlmeier

Mirel Wagner chronology
Mirel Wagner (2011)	When the Cellar Children See the Light of Day (2014)

Singles from Mirel Wagner
- 1. "No Death" Released: August 12, 2011

Professional ratings
Review scores
Source	Rating
Pitchfork Media	7.8/10 stars
PopMatters	7/10 stars
Mojo	4/5 stars
Helsingin Sanomat	5/5 stars
Soundi	5/5 stars

Mirel Wagner is the debut album by the Finnish singer-songwriter Mirel Wagner, released in Finland in February 2011 by the indie label Kioski. It was later released in Great Britain and Europe by Bone Voyage Records in October 2011 and in North America by Friendly Fire Recordings in March 2012.

== Commercial response ==
The album reached No. 15 in the Finnish Album Chart in April 2011, returning for three weeks in January 2012 and reaching #23.

== Singles ==
The single "No Death" was released in August 2011.

== Track listing ==
All tracks are written by Mirel Wagner

No.	Title	Length
1.	"To the Bone"	2:44
2.	"The Well"	3:38
3.	"No Death"	3:09
4.	"No Hands"	2:30
5.	"Red"	4:56
6.	"Despair"	4:17
7.	"Joe"	3:31
8.	"Dream"	3:07
9.	"The Road"	2:41
Total length:		30:33
