= Blood Bitch =

Studio album by Jenny Hval
- Released: 30 September 2016
- Genre: Experimental pop
- Length: 36:26
- Label: Sacred Bones Records
- Producers: Jenny Hval; Lasse Marhaug

Jenny Hval chronology
Apocalypse, girl (2015)	Blood Bitch (2016)	The Practice of Love (2019)

Singles from Blood Bitch
- 1. "Female Vampire" Released: May 27, 2016; 2. "Conceptual Romance" Released: July 26, 2016; 3. "Period Piece" Released: September 15, 2016

Blood Bitch is the sixth studio album by Norwegian musician Jenny Hval, released on September 30, 2016 on Sacred Bones Records. Co-produced by Hval and Lasse Marhaug, the album was preceded by the singles, "Female Vampire", "Conceptual Romance" and "Period Piece".

Described as "an investigation of blood", Blood Bitch is a concept album which draws parallels between a fictional time-travelling vampire, named Orlando, and Hval's own experiences touring her previous studio album, Apocalypse, girl (2015). The album's lyrical content is also influenced by menstruation, 1970s horror and exploitation films and Virginia Woolf.

== Writing and composition ==
During the writing process for Blood Bitch, Hval was influenced by vampiric imagery and 1970s horror and exploitation films: “I was amazed about how much taboo they could contain without moral compass, how much incest there could be.” In a statement released upon the album's announcement, she elaborated: "Blood Bitch is a fictitious story, fed by characters and images from horror and exploitation films of the '70s. With that language, rather than smart, modern social commentary, I found I could tell a different story about myself and my own time: a poetic diary of modern transience and transcendence."

Describing the album has her "most fictional and most personal album," Hval noted that its dark lyrical and musical content reconnected her with her goth and metal roots: "It’s also the first album where I’ve started reconnecting with the [sic] scene I started out playing in many years ago, by remembering the drony qualities of Norwegian Black Metal. It’s an album of vampires, lunar cycles, sticky choruses, and the smell of warm leaves and winter."

Orlando, the vampiric character whom much of the album focuses upon, was influenced by the Virginia Woolf novel, Orlando: A Biography. Hval elaborated: "[Woolf's] Orlando is a character that lives through several centuries. He starts out being a male growing up. At some point through history, he changes into a she. So it’s a coming of age story that is very fluid, traveling through time and gender. It’s a really lovely book and I think all of my albums are inspired by it in some way because it’s one of those things I read quite early on. It really influenced the way I think about art. For example: With this album, I didn’t intend to do anything in particular beyond beautiful songs when I started writing it. A horror theme and a vampire theme quickly came into it almost subconsciously. When it was all finished, I realized it was just Orlando."

Hval has also described novelist Chris Kraus as "someone I’ve just read and reread constantly and who’s been a really huge [...] inspiration for me." The track Conceptual Romance's references Kraus' I Love Dick and, like the novel, looks at the intersection of feminism and infatuation.

== Recording ==
Hval co-produced the album with Norwegian noise music musician Lasse Marhaug, who had previously collaborated with Hval on her previous album, Apocalypse, girl. Regarding his initial scepticism over working alongside Hval, he noted: "I come from the noise, underground, contemporary, and improvised music [scenes], and I had no experience making pop music. It didn’t make sense to ask me to produce to a pop album. [But Jenny’s] a very smart person, and she obviously saw something in me that I didn’t realize that I had." On working with Marhaug, Hval noted, "Lasse relates to sound in an abstract way. That’s a better way to look at it than as individual songs because many times you end up with an illusion that can’t be broken. Looking at the album as a whole and then putting holes in it means you have these bits of reality peaking through. I love those moments."

== Critical reception ==
Professional ratings
Aggregate scores
Source	Rating
AnyDecentMusic?	7.8/10
Metacritic	84/100
Review scores
Source	Rating
AllMusic	4.5/5 stars
Consequence of Sound	B+
Drowned in Sound	9/10
The Irish Times	4/5 stars
Mojo	4/5 stars
The Observer	4/5 stars
Pitchfork	8.3/10
Record Collector	4/5 stars
Slant Magazine	4/5 stars
Uncut	8/10

Blood Bitch received widespread acclaim from music critics. At Metacritic, which assigns a normalized rating out of 100 to reviews from mainstream critics, the album received an average score of 84 based on 23 reviews, indicating "universal acclaim".

Writing for AllMusic, Heather Phares praised Hval's dedication to the album's themes, alongside its overall aesthetic and unexpected pop-based songwriting: "a bewitching album from an artist at the peak of her powers."

=== Accolades ===
Publication	Accolade	Year	Rank	Ref.
Consequence of Sound	Top 50 Albums of 2016	2016	21	
FACTmag	50 Best Albums of the Year 2016	2016	1	
The Guardian	The Best Albums of 2016	2016	26	
The Independent	Best Albums of 2016	2016	4	
Paste	The 50 Best Albums of 2016	2016	42	
Pitchfork	The 50 Best Albums of 2016	2016	23	
Pitchfork	The 20 Best Experimental Albums of 2016	2016	—N/a	
The Quietus	Albums of the Year 2016	2016	10	
Rough Trade	Albums of the Year	2016	75	
Stereogum	The 50 Best Albums of 2016	2016	38	

== Track listing ==
All tracks are written by Jenny Hval except for tracks 3 and 8, co-written by Lasse Marhaug.

No.	Title	Length
1.	"Ritual Awakening"	1:42
2.	"Female Vampire"	3:37
3.	"In the Red"	2:21
4.	"Conceptual Romance"	4:32
5.	"Untamed Region"	4:51
6.	"The Great Undressing"	4:00
7.	"Period Piece"	2:41
8.	"The Plague"	5:57
9.	"Secret Touch"	4:39
10.	"Lorna"	2:06

== Personnel ==
- Jenny Hval – vocals, background vocals, composer, arranger, instruments, production, programming (all tracks), concept
- Lasse Marhaug – art direction, composer (tracks 3 & 8), mixing, production (all tracks)
- Marcus Schmickler – mastering

== Charts ==
Chart (2016)	Peak position
Belgian Albums (Ultratop Wallonia)	192
