= In the Silence =

Studio album by Ásgeir
- Released: 28 October 2013
- Studio: Hljóðriti Studios, Hafnarfjörður, Iceland
- Genre: Folktronica
- Length: 39:20
- Language: English
- Label: One Little Indian
- Producer: Guðmundur Kristinn Jónsson

Ásgeir chronology
Dýrð í dauðaþögn (2012)	In the Silence (2013)	Afterglow (2017)

Singles from In the Silence
- 1. "King and Cross" Released: August 2013; 2. "Going Home" Released: October 2013; 3. "Torrent" Released: 14 December 2013

Professional ratings
Aggregate scores
Source	Rating
Metacritic	79/100
Review scores
Source	Rating
Clash	8/10
Drowned in Sound	8/10
The Guardian	3/5 stars
The Line of Best Fit	8.5/10
musicOMH	4/5 stars
NME	7/10

In the Silence is the second studio album by Icelandic singer-songwriter Ásgeir, and is his first all-English album. It was released digitally on 28 October 2013 and physically on 27 January 2014.

The album includes the same tracklist as his highly successful debut album Dýrð í dauðaþögn in the Icelandic language, but with translated or new English-language lyrics by John Grant (from original lyrics in Icelandic by Einar Georg Einarsson, Ásgeir's father).

The album has charted in Belgium and the Netherlands and the debut single, "Going Home", has charted in France.

While promoting the record, Ásgeir played acoustic cover versions of Miley Cyrus' "Wrecking Ball" on Dutch 3FM and, to more acclaim, Nirvana's "Heart-Shaped Box" on the French radio station OUI , adding the latter to his live setlists, and eventually releasing it on the deluxe edition of the album.

== Critical reception ==
At Metacritic, which assigns a normalised rating out of 100 to reviews from mainstream critics, In the Silence received an average score of 78, based on 12 reviews, which indicates "generally favorable reviews". The Independent's Andy Gill remarked "In the Silence has a charm and presence that marks the young Icelander out as a significant talent, the appeal of its fragile hymns to nature and the numinous growing through the intervening months […] A natural wonder" rating the album four stars out of five.] "There is a constant hint of melancholy that resides in the beauty of Ásgeir's high-pitched and unnervingly emotive vocals, which is brought out in the more brooding moments of the record," said Scott Kerr of AllMusic. The Guardian's Alexis Petridis was less complimentary, judging the album to be "acoustic indie-folk of whimsical bent [...] [the record contains] very pretty songs, albeit of a kind that seem predestined to waft gently in the background of TV ads or romcoms." Drowned in Sound's Paul Faller awarded the record four stars, declaring "The everything-but-the-kitchen-sink promotional campaign--an appearance on Made In Chelsea here, a cover of 'Wrecking Ball' on Dutch radio there—might smack of desperation. Fortunately, In the Silence is more than good enough to dispel any such impressions."

== Track listing ==
All tracks are written by Ásgeir Trausti Einarsson (music) and Einar Georg Einarsson (lyrics), except where noted. English translations by John Grant.

In the Silence – Standard edition
No.	Title	Writer(s)	Length
1.	"Higher"		3:22
2.	"In the Silence"	Ásgeir Trausti Einarsson, Júlíus Aðalsteinn Róbertsson	3:54
3.	"Summer Guest"		3:44
4.	"King and Cross"	Ásgeir Trausti Einarsson, Einar Georg Einarsson, Júlíus Aðalsteinn Róbertsson	3:32
5.	"Was There Nothing?"	Ásgeir Trausti Einarsson, Júlíus Aðalsteinn Róbertsson	3:48
6.	"Torrent"		3:36
7.	"Going Home"		4:50
8.	"Head in the Snow"		4:14
9.	"In Harmony"	Ásgeir Trausti Einarsson, Júlíus Aðalsteinn Róbertsson	4:18
10.	"On That Day"		3:45
Total length:			39:20

In the Silence – iTunes bonus track
No.	Title	Writer(s)	Length
11.	"Soothe This Pain"	Ásgeir Trausti Einarsson, Órvar Þóreyjarson Smárason	3:22

In the Silence – Australian and Icelandic edition bonus tracks
No.	Title	Writer(s)	Length
11.	"Lupin Intrigue"	Guðmundur Jonsson, Randi Ward, Ásgeir Trausti Einarsson	4:41
12.	"Soothe This Pain"	Ásgeir Trausti Einarsson, Júlíus Aðalsteinn	4:25
13.	"Going Home" (Toe Rag Sessions)	Ásgeir Trausti Einarsson, Júlíus Aðalsteinn	4:53
14.	"Summer Guest" (Toe Rag Sessions)	Ásgeir Trausti Einarsson, Júlíus Aðalsteinn	3:51
15.	"On That Day" (Toe Rag Sessions)	Ásgeir Trausti Einarsson, Júlíus Aðalsteinn	4:13

In the Silence – Deluxe edition CD three
No.	Title	Writer(s)	Length
1.	"Dreaming"	Þorsteinn Einarsson, Ásgeir Trausti Einarsson	4:43
2.	"Ocean"	Jón Ingvar Hjaltason, Ásgeir Trausti Einarsson	3:29
3.	"It Will Rain"	Þorsteinn Einarsson, Ásgeir Trausti Einarsson	3:09
4.	"Stormurinn"		3:34
5.	"Frost"	Július Aðalstein Róbertsson, Ásgeir Trausti Einarsson	4:45
6.	"Soothe This Pain"	Ásgeir Trausti Einarsson, Örvar Þóreyjarson Smárason	4:29
7.	"Nú Hann Blæs"	Július Aðalstein Róbertsson, Ásgeir Trausti Einarsson	4:57
8.	"Heart-Shaped Box"	Kurt Cobain	5:38
9.	"Torrent" (Toe Rag Sessions)	Einar Georg Einarsson, Júlíus Aðalsteinn Róbertsson, Ásgeir Trausti Einarsson	4:44
10.	"Going Home" (Toe Rag Sessions)		4:53
11.	"Summer Guest" (Toe Rag Sessions)		3:55
12.	"On That Day" (Toe Rag Sessions)		4:20
13.	"King and Cross" (Dot Major Remix)		6:11
14.	"Torrent" (Stay+ Remix)		6:18
15.	"King and Cross" (Liam Howe Remix)		3:55

=== Notes ===
- "Nú hann blæs" is an Icelandic version of Ásgeir's Record Store Day single, "Here It Comes" (picture disc 7" limited edition, released as double a-side with "Heart-Shaped Box"
- "Frost" is an Icelandic version of "Lupin Intrigue"

== Personnel ==
Musicians

Track numbers beginning with 3 refer to the bonus CD in the deluxe edition.

- Ásgeir Trausti Einarsson – vocals (all tracks), backing vocals (all tracks), guitar (all tracks), bass guitar (tracks 6, 9, 10), keyboards (tracks 1–9), piano (tracks 1, 3, 4, 5, 6, 7, 9, 10), programming (tracks 3-2, 3-3, 3-5, 3-6, 3-7, 3-8)
- Sigurður Guðmundsson – keyboards (tracks 1, 2, 3, 4, 6, 7, 8, 9), piano (track 2), bass guitar (tracks 2, 3, 4), backing vocals (track 3), harmonium (track 5)
- Kristinn Snær Agnarsson – drums (tracks 1, 2, 4, 6, 7, 9, 3-4, 3-6), percussion (track 3)
- Þorsteinn Einarsson – guitar (tracks 2, 3), backing vocals (tracks 3, 10)
- Samúel Jón Samúelsson – trombone (tracks 1, 2, 4, 7, 9, 3-1, 3-6)
- Kjartan Hákonarson – trumpet (tracks 1, 2, 4, 7, 9, 3-1, 3-6)
- Óskar Guðjónsson – saxophone (tracks 1, 2, 4, 7, 9, 3-1, 3-6)
- Valdimar Kolbeinn Sigurjónsson – bass guitar (track 1)
- Ingi Björn Ingasson – bass guitar (tracks 4, 3-3)
- Guðmundur Kristinn Jónsson – programming (tracks 3-1, 3-2, 3-3, 3-5, 3-6, 3-7), keyboards (track 3-7)
- Nils Törnqvist – drums (track 3-1)
- Helgi Svavar Helgason – drums (tracks 3-1, 3-7)
- Þórunn Ósk Harðarsdóttir – viola (track 3-7)
- Guðrún Hrund Harðarsdóttir – viola (track 3-7)
- Hrafnkell Orri Egilsson – cello (track 3-7)
- Magnús Trygvason Eliassen – drums (track 3-8)

Recording personnel

- Guðmundur Kristinn Jónsson – producer, recording, mixing, engineering
- Sigurður Guðmundsson – recording
- Kristinn Snær Agnarsson – recording
- Ásgeir Trausti Einarsson – recording, engineering
- Friðjón Jónsson – assistant engineer
- Liam Watson – Toe Rag Sessions engineering and mixing
- Styrmir Hauksson – Toe Rag Sessions mixing
- Samuél Jón Samúelsson – horns arrangement
- Hrafnkell Orri Egilsson – string arrangements
- Dot Major – remixing (track 3-13)
- Stay+ – remixing (track 3-14)
- Liam Howe – remixing and production (track 3-15)

Original version artwork

- Svarti Hrinhurinn – cover art (original version)
- Jónína de la Rosa – photography
- Bobby Breiðholt – design

Deluxe edition artwork

- Bobby Breiðholt – design
- Photography: Jónatan Grétarsson

== Charts ==
=== Weekly charts ===
Weekly chart performance for In the Silence
Chart (2013–2014)	Peak position
Australian Albums (ARIA))	8
Belgian Albums (Ultratop Flanders)	42
Belgian Albums (Ultratop Wallonia)	102
Dutch Albums (MegaCharts)	36
French Albums (SNEP)	32
UK Albums (OCC)	40

=== Year-end charts ===
Year-end chart performance for In the Silence
Chart (2016)	Position
Icelandic Albums (Plötutíóindi)	82
