= Selvutsletter =

Studio album by Lost Girls
- Released: 20 October 2023
- Length: 40:36
- Label: Smalltown Supersound
- Producer: Lost Girls; Kyrre Laastad

Lost Girls chronology
Menneskekollektivet (2021)	Selvutsletter (2023)

Singles from Selvutsletter
- 1. "Ruins" Released: 17 July 2023; 2. "With the Other Hand" Released: 21 August 2023

Selvutsletter is the second studio album by Norwegian art pop duo Lost Girls, musicians Jenny Hval and Håvard Volden. It was released on 20 October 2023 through Smalltown Supersound.

== Background ==
Hval and Volden released the lead single "Ruins" on 17 July 2023, a song about the "practice of discovery" and the feeling of approaching "something ancient and magical". The duo announced their second collaborative project on 21 August, accompanied by the release of "With the Other Hand". The track was inspired by Leonard Cohen and follows around "someone's mysterious journey".

== Critical reception ==
Professional ratings
Aggregate scores
Source	Rating
Metacritic	79/100
Review scores
Source	Rating
AllMusic	4/5 stars
The Guardian	3/5 stars
Pitchfork	7.8/10
Slant Magazine	3.5/5 stars

Selvutsletter received a score of 79 out of 100 on review aggregator Metacritic based on seven critics' reviews, indicating "generally favorable" reception. Daniel Bromfield at Pitchfork noticed shrunk track lengths compared to its predecessor Menneskekollektivet but within the "relatively brief runtimes" Bromfield found a "wealth of creativity", being thrilled to follow Hval down every "rabbit hole". Exclaim!'s Kaelen Bell saw Selvutsletter as an extension of Hval's subconscious and described the music with Volden as a "calling card all its own".

Charles Lyons-Burt of Slant Magazine did not see Selvutsletter as catching "the same wonders" as their debut but acknowledges the duo "admirably" trying "some news things", including the scratch of a "pleasure" itch "you didn't know you needed", while "neglecting the one you thought you did". Likewise, Damien Morris at The Guardian thought that Lost Girls avoid a confrontation that the "seemingly semi-improvised music requires" and highlights the "more conventional songs" of the record.

== Track listing ==
Selvutsletter track listing
No.	Title	Length
1.	"Timed Intervals"	4:28
2.	"With the Other Hand"	3:11
3.	"Ruins"	4:55
4.	"Re-entering the City"	4:12
5.	"World on Fire"	3:19
6.	"Jeg Slutter Meg Selv"	6:52
7.	"June 1996"	4:06
8.	"Seawhite"	9:33
Total length:		40:36
