= Mirel Wagner =

Finnish singer-songwriter (born 1987)

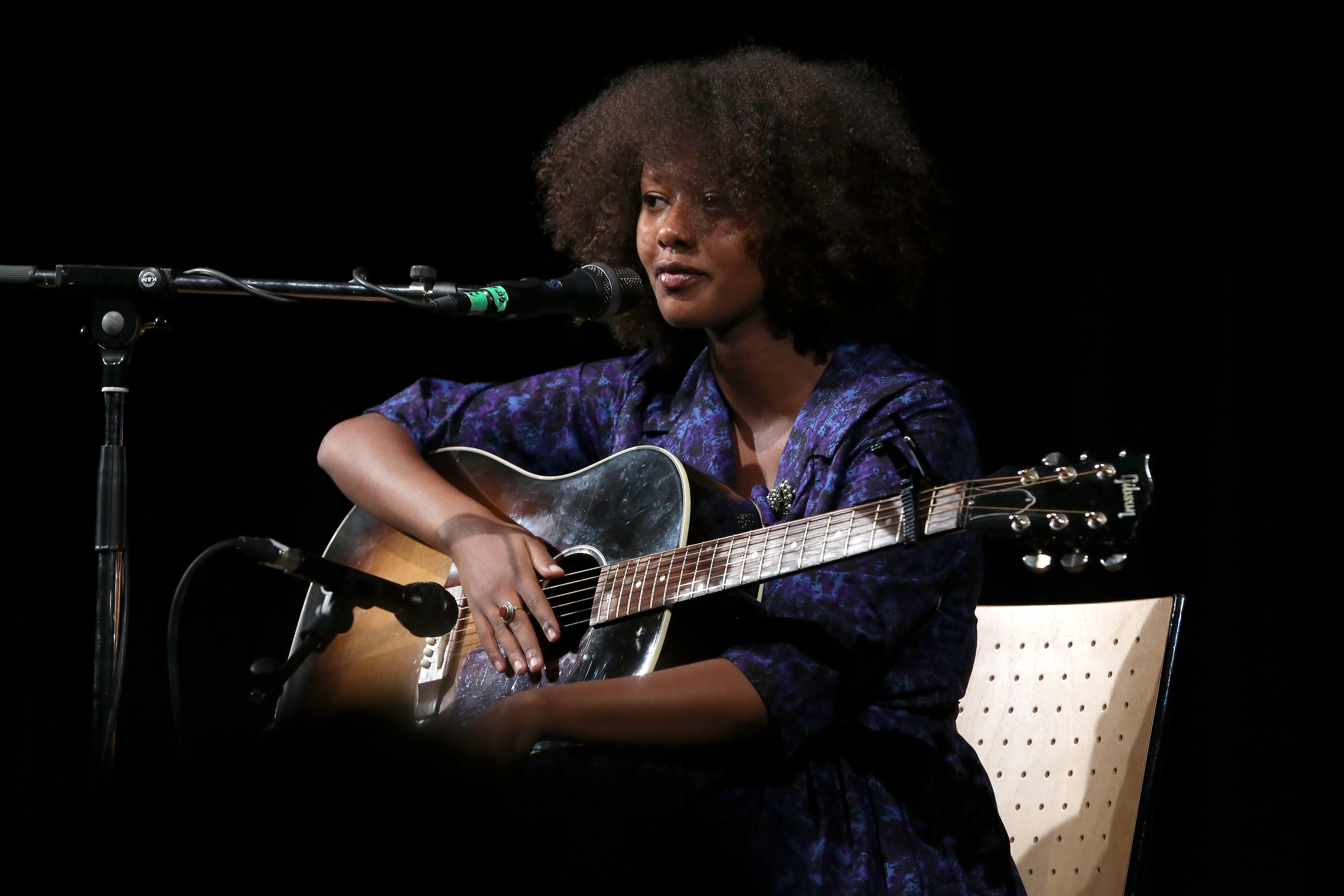
- Wagner live at Waves Vienna 2014 festival in Vienna, Austria
- Born: Mirel Wagner; December 3, 1987 (age 37); Ethiopia
- Citizenship: Finnish
- Occupation: Singer-songwriter
- Musical career
- Genres: Folk music, blues
- Instruments: Vocals, guitar
- Years active: 2011–present
- Labels: Kioski (Finland), Bone Voyage Recordings (UK, Europe), Friendly Fire Recordings (US), Sub Pop

Mirel Wagner (born 3 December 1987) is a Finnish singer-songwriter. She was born in Ethiopia and raised in Espoo, Finland.

== Career ==
Wagner has been writing songs since the age of 16. Her self-titled debut album was released in February 2011 by the Finnish indie label Kioski. It was later released in United Kingdom and Europe by Bone Voyage Recordings and in North America by Friendly Fire Recordings. In August 2012 Time Magazine listed Wagner as one of the "11 Great Bands You Don't Know (But Should)". Although her debut album was not a big success, it created a lot of attention and in February 2014 Wagner was signed by the American record label Sub Pop.

Wagner's second album When the Cellar Children See the Light of Day was released in August 2014. The album peaked number one at the Finnish Album Chart. It was a nominee for the 2014 Nordic Music Prize which is an annual award for the Best Nordic Album Of The Year. She won the prize.

On 21 April 2015, Wagner performed on the music television show Later... with Jools Holland.

She also did the trailer song for Gore Verbinski's 2017 film A Cure for Wellness, which was a cover of The Ramones song "I Wanna Be Sedated".

== Discography ==
Albums

- Mirel Wagner (2011)
- When the Cellar Children See the Light of Day (2014)

Singles

- "No Death" (2011)
- "Lean" (2012)
- "Oak Tree" (2014)
