= Jenny Hval =

Norwegian musician (born 1980)

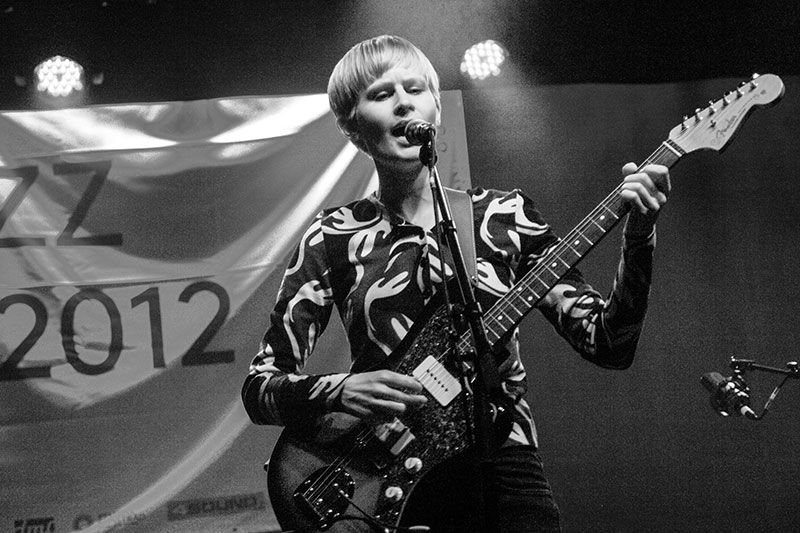
- Hval performing in Aarhus, 2012

Background information
- Also known as: Rockettothesky (2006–2008)
- Born: Jenny Hval; 11 July 1980 (age 46); Tvedestrand, Norway
- Genres: Indie electronic; art pop; ambient; avant-garde; spoken word
- Occupations: Singer-songwriter; record producer; writer
- Instruments: Vocals; guitar; piano; synthesizer
- Years active: 2003–present
- Labels: 4AD; Sacred Bones; Rune Grammofon; Su Tissue
- Website: jennyhval.com

Jenny Hval (/ˈvɑːl/ vaal, born 11 July 1980) is a Norwegian singer-songwriter, record producer, and novelist. She has released nine solo albums, two under the alias Rockettothesky and seven under her own name. In 2015, Hval released her fifth studio album, Apocalypse, Girl, to widespread critical acclaim on the label Sacred Bones. She followed with several well-received solo albums on Sacred Bones and later 4AD Records.

Under the name Lost Girls, Hval has released two full-length collaborative studio albums – Menneskekollektivet (2021) and Selvutsletter (2023) – with her husband and musical partner Håvard Volden.

After initially studying literature and working as a freelance columnist and writer, Jenny Hval has published four novels, Perlebryggeriet (Pearl Brewery) (2009, translated into English as Paradise Rot: A Novel), Inn i ansiktet (Into the Face) (2012) and Å hate Gud (To Hate God) (2018, translated into English as Girls Against God).

== Music career ==
Until 1999, Hval was the vocalist of a gothic metal band called Shellyz Raven. She studied at the University of Melbourne, Australia, specializing in creative writing and performance. While studying, she was vocalist in Australian bands iPanic and Folding For Air with Thomas McGowan, releasing an EP titled Are you afraid of heights? in 2004.

=== Debut EP ===
Moving back to Norway, she released her debut EP Cigars in 2006, and was nominated for a Spellemannprisen (the Norwegian equivalent of Grammy Awards) in the "best newcomer" category. Adopting the name Rockettothesky, she was signed to Trust Me Records, releasing two studio albums – To Sing You Apple Trees in 2006, and Medea in 2008.

Following the release of Medea, she went back to using her birth name. Signing on the label Rune Grammofon, she released the albums Viscera (2011) and Innocence Is Kinky (2013). In 2015 she released her third album, Apocalypse, Girl on New York City's Sacred Bones Records. Her solo music has been described as avant-garde, art-pop, and "a kind of experimental folk music," among other terms. She has also collaborated with Håvard Volden, as Nude on Sand, releasing a self-titled album in 2012, and with Susanna Wallumrød, which resulted in a 2014 album Meshes of Voice (released on Wallumrød's SusannaSonata label). She supported St. Vincent on a tour.

=== Blood Bitch ===
In 2016 she released the album Blood Bitch where she collaborates with Lasse Marhaug. The album was awarded the Phonofile Nordic Music Prize in 2017. The judges released a statement calling the album "engrossing, atmospheric, challenging and thought-provoking."

In 2018 she collaborated with Håvard Volden again under the name Lost Girls, to release an EP entitled Feeling. The duo's name was inspired by the eponymous graphic novel.

In September 2019, Hval released her seventh album, The Practice of Love, featuring guest vocals from Vivian Wang (formerly of the psych rock band The Observatory), Australian singer-songwriter Laura Jean, and French experimental musician Félicia Atkinson. Hval had intended a tour to promote the album, but cancelled the North American shows due to the COVID-19 pandemic.

In 2021, Lost Girls released their first full-length LP, Menneskekollektivet. The album was received to "universal acclaim," according to aggregate review website Metacritic.

Classic Objects, her eighth album released in March 2022, also received universal critical acclaim. A second Lost Girls studio album, Selvutsletter, was released in October 2023.

=== Iris Silver Mist ===
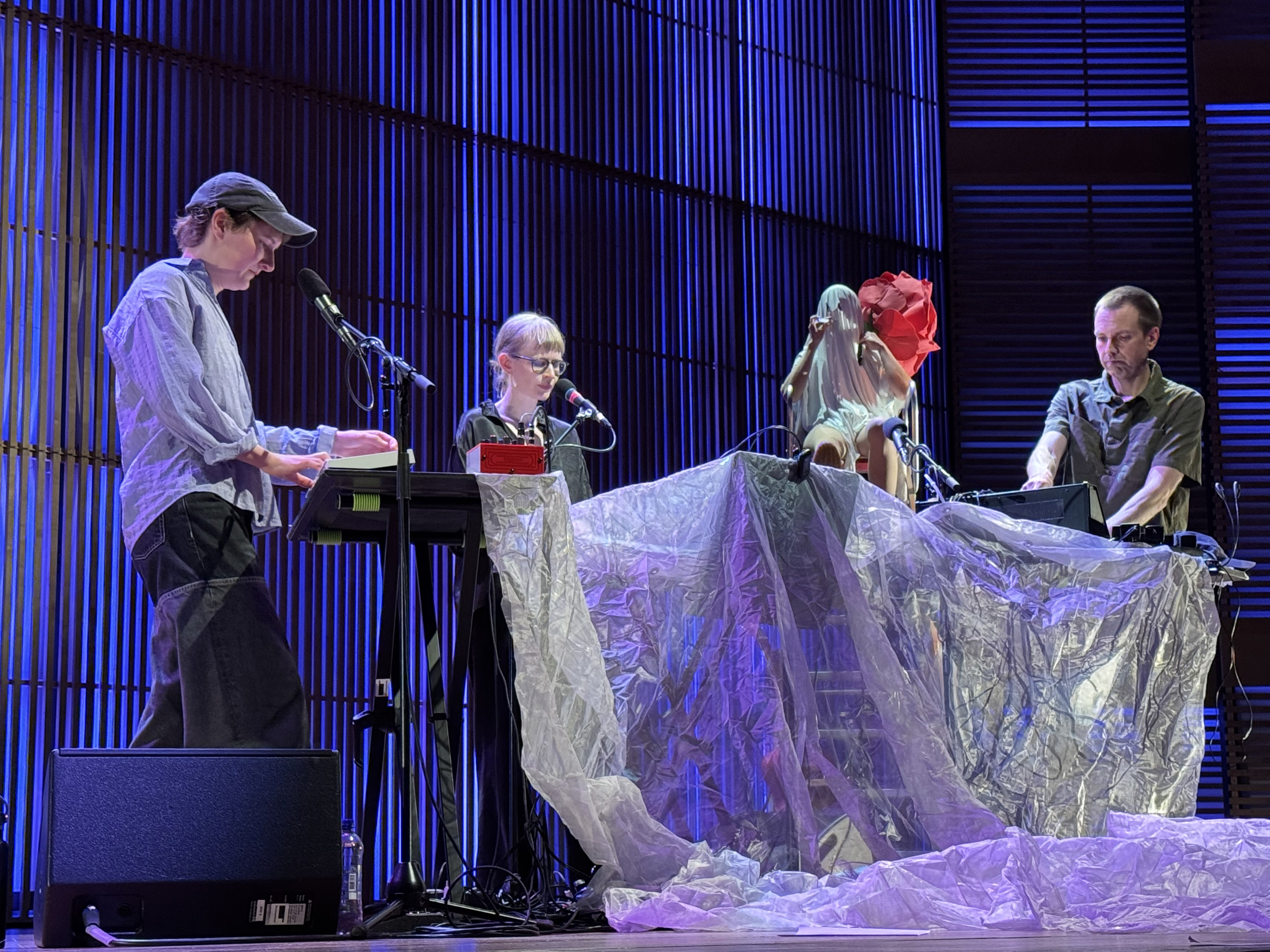
Hval performing with her band in 2025 at Muziekgebouw aan 't IJ in Amsterdam, the Netherlands

On 1 May 2025, Hval released her ninth studio album, Iris Silver Mist. Named after a perfume by Serge Lutens, the album is influenced by fragrances, the sense of smell, and Hval's 2024 live performance piece, I Want To Be a Machine, which was described as "open-ended mediation on the purpose of art". Regarding the resulting studio album, Hval noted: "I think I’ve made an album that very much places music in between life and death, a place to speak with – or sing with – the dead. Whether it’s people, other artwork, public space, or democracy. This is how I see the sort of eerie string sounds on some of the album tracks. Misty, hoarse, ghostly, but still making sound, and with texture and scent."

== Style and influences ==
Hval was influenced by the androgyny in 1980s pop music. In particular, she was inspired by the music video for Kate Bush's song "Cloudbusting", which features Bush as a young boy; Hval has expressed her admiration for the English musician's ability to write from many different perspectives. In her Master's thesis, The Singing Voice as Literature, Hval explored the sound poetry of Kate Bush's music, analysing the lyrics and music together, instead of as separate parts of a song.

Hval's spoken-word delivery has also been compared to Laurie Anderson's artistic output.

== Novels ==
After studying literature and working as a freelance columnist and writer, Jenny Hval published her novel Perlebryggeriet (Pearl Brewery) in 2009. An English edition, titled Paradise Rot: A Novel, was translated by Marjam Idriss and published by Verso Books in October 2018. Her second work, Inn i ansiktet (Into the Face), was published in Norway in October 2012. Hval published her third novel, Å hate Gud (To Hate God), in 2018, which also received a translation into English by Marjam Idriss and was published by Verso Books under the title Girls Against God in October 2020.

== Discography ==
=== Studio albums ===
As Rockettothesky

Title	Album details	Peak chart positions
Title	Album details	NOR
To Sing You Apple Trees	Released: 2 October 2006; Label: Trust Me Records; Formats: CD, digital download	—
Medea	Released: 13 October 2008; Label: Trust Me Records; Formats: CD, digital download	20

As Jenny Hval

Title	Album details	Peak chart positions	
Title	Album details	NOR	SCO
Viscera	Released: 26 April 2011; Label: Rune Grammofon; Formats: LP, CD, digital download	24	—
Innocence Is Kinky	Released: 19 April 2013; Label: Rune Grammofon; Formats: LP, CD, digital download	31	—
Meshes of Voice (with Susanna Wallumrød)	Released: 15 August 2014; Label: SusannaSonata; Formats: LP, CD, digital download	—	—
Apocalypse, Girl	Released: 9 June 2015; Label: Sacred Bones; Formats: LP, CD, digital download	—	—
In the End His Voice Will Be the Sound of Paper (with Trondheim Jazz Orchestra & Kim Myhr)	Released: 26 February 2016; Label: Hubro; Formats: LP, CD, digital download	—	—
Blood Bitch	Released: 30 September 2016; Label: Sacred Bones; Formats: LP, CD, digital download	—	—
The Practice of Love	Released: 13 September 2019; Label: Sacred Bones; Formats: LP, CD, digital download	—	—
Classic Objects	Released: 11 March 2022; Label: 4AD; Formats: LP, CD, digital download	—	70
Iris Silver Mist	Released: 2 May 2025; Label: 4AD; Formats: LP, CD, digital download	—	—

With Lost Girls

Title	Album details
Menneskekollektivet	Released: 26 March 2021; Formats: LP, digital download
Selvutsletter	Released: 20 October 2023; Formats: LP, digital download

With Nude on Sand

Title	Album details
Nude on Sand	Released: 6 January 2012; Label: Sofa; Formats: CD, digital download

=== EPs ===
As Rockettothesky

Title	Album details
Cigars	Released: 2006; Formats: CD, digital download

With Lost Girls

Title	Album details
Feeling	Released: 2 March 2018; Formats: LP, digital download

As Jenny Hval

Title	Album details
The Long Sleep	Released: 25 May 2018; Formats: Digital download

Awards
Preceded by Susanna and Ensemble Neon	Recipient of the Open-Class Spellemannprisen; 2014	Succeeded by -
