= Paradise Rot =

2009 novel by Jenny Hval

- Author: Jenny Hval
- Original title: Perlebryggeriet
- Translator: Marjam Idriss
- Language: Norwegian
- Genre: Fiction
- Publisher: Verso Books
- Publication date: 2009
- Publication place: Norway
- English publication date: October 2, 2018
- ISBN: 978-1-786-63383-5

Paradise Rot is a novel written by Jenny Hval. The original Norwegian novel was published in 2009 and was titled Perlebryggeriet (Pearl Brewery). The English version of the book, translated by Marjam Idriss, was published by Verso Books in 2018.

== Plot ==
Jo, a twenty-year-old Norwegian studying abroad in a fictional seaside town, moves in with an eccentric older girl, Carral, who lives in a renovated old brewery. The apartment has few, thin walls and there is no privacy for either of the girls. As the semester progresses, Jo and Carral grow closer.

== Reception ==
Reviews of Paradise Rot describe the novel as "grotesque", "surreal", and "downright nasty".

Pitchfork's Niina Pollari wrote, "The strength of Paradise Rot is its peculiar narrator, whose headspace provides Hval with a showcase for her descriptive style." PopMatters praised the writing as well: "Paradise Rot is not necessarily a pleasurable read, blurring the lines of the coming-of-age genre with psychological horror and rendered in such lucid, impressionistically descriptive prose that merely reading it makes you feel fairly woozy."

In 2024, the novel experienced a surge in popularity as a 'disturbing book' due to attention from the BookTok community on TikTok.
