= Viscera (Jenny Hval album) =

Studio album by Jenny Hval
- Released: 18 February 2011
- Studio: Kampen Kirke; Sagene
- Length: 54:25
- Label: Rune Grammofon
- Producer: Jenny Hval; Deathprod

Jenny Hval chronology
Medea (2008)	Viscera (2011)	Innocence Is Kinky (2012)

Viscera is a studio album by Norwegian singer-songwriter Jenny Hval. It was released in 2011 through Rune Grammofon.

== Background ==
Under the pseudonym Rockettothesky, Jenny Hval released two albums: To Sing You Apple Trees (2006) and Medea (2008). Viscera is her third album in total, as well as her first album under her own name. It contains performances by Hval, Håvard Volden, and Kyrre Laastad. Music videos were released for the tracks "Blood Flight" and "How Gentle". The album was released on 18 February 2011 through Rune Grammofon.

== Critical reception ==
Professional ratings
Review scores
Source	Rating
Cokemachineglow	89%
MusicOMH	4/5 stars
PopMatters	6/10

Dylan Nelson of PopMatters commented that Jenny Hval "sings in a keening voice about her body, her sexuality and her feelings, all of which are embodied simultaneously in the fragile, picked strings and spooky backup vocals that provide the album's ambience." Daniel Paton of MusicOMH stated, "With Viscera, Jenny Hval has opted to explore sensuality, the body, eroticism and female sexuality in a remarkably candid manner."

=== Accolades ===
Year-end lists for Viscera
Publication	List	Rank	Ref.
Cokemachineglow	Top 50 Albums 2011	4	
In Review Online	Top 15 Albums of 2011	8	
Uncut	Top 50 Albums of 2011	42	

== Track listing ==
All tracks are written by Jenny Hval.

Viscera track listing
No.	Title	Length
1.	"Engines in the City"	3:38
2.	"Blood Flight"	6:45
3.	"Portrait of the Young Girl as an Artist"	6:40
4.	"How Gentle"	7:25
5.	"A Silver Fox"	1:43
6.	"Golden Locks"	6:18
7.	"This Is a Thirst"	8:02
8.	"Milk of Marrow"	7:54
9.	"Black Morning/Viscera"	6:00
Total length:		54:25

== Personnel ==
Credits adapted from liner notes.

- Jenny Hval – vocals, guitar, church organ, zither, arrangement, production, additional recording
- Håvard Volden – electric guitar, acoustic guitar, baritone guitar, psaltery, arrangement
- Kyrre Laastad – drums, drum machine, synthesizer, church organ, arrangement
- Deathprod – production
- Helge Sten – recording, mixing
- Bob Katz – mastering
- Kim Hiorthøy – design
