= When the Cellar Children See the Light of Day =

Studio album by Mirel Wagner
- Released: August 12, 2014
- Genres: Folk music, indie rock
- Length: 31:02
- Labels: Kioski, SubPop
- Producer: Vladislav Delay

Mirel Wagner chronology
Mirel Wagner (2011)	When the Cellar Children See the Light of Day (2014)

Singles from When the Cellar Children See the Light of Day
- 1. "Oak Tree" Released: May 20, 2014

Professional ratings
Review scores
Source	Rating
Pitchfork Media	7.2/10 stars
PopMatters	6/10 stars
Mojo	5/5 stars
The New Zealand Herald	4.5/5 stars
AllMusic	4/5 stars
The Guardian	3/5 stars
The Irish Times	3/5 stars

When the Cellar Children See the Light of Day is the second studio album by the Finnish singer-songwriter Mirel Wagner, released worldwide in August 2014 by the American label Sub Pop. In Finland it was released by the indie label Kioski.

The album won the 2014 Nordic Music Prize which is an annual award for the best Nordic album.

== Commercial response ==
The album peaked #1 in the Finnish Album Chart in August 2014.

== Singles ==
The single Oak Tree was released in May 2014.

== Track listing ==
All tracks are written by Mirel Wagner.

No.	Title	Length
1.	"1 2 3 4"	2:10
2.	"The Dirt"	3:37
3.	"Ellipsis"	3:43
4.	"Oak Tree"	3:02
5.	"In My Father's House"	3:36
6.	"Dreamt of a Wave"	2:29
7.	"The Devil's Tongue"	2:15
8.	"What Love Looks Like"	3:08
9.	"Taller Than Tall Trees"	4:55
10.	"Goodnight"	2:07
Total length:		31:02
