= Afterglow (Ásgeir album) =

Studio album by Ásgeir
- Released: 5 May 2017
- Recorded: Hljóðriti Studios, Hafnarfjörður, Iceland
- Genre: Folk-pop
- Length: 43:31
- Language: English; Icelandic
- Label: One Little Indian
- Producer: Guðmundur Kristinn Jónsson; Ásgeir

Ásgeir chronology
In the Silence (2013)	Afterglow (2017)	Bury the Moon (2020)

Afterglow is the third studio album by Icelandic singer-songwriter Ásgeir, released on 5 May 2017 through One Little Indian Records. It received mixed reviews from critics and charted across Europe, as well as reaching number 22 in Australia.

== Critical reception ==
Professional ratings
Aggregate scores
Source	Rating
Metacritic	58/100
Review scores
Source	Rating
Clash	7/10
Mojo	2/5 stars
MusicOMH	3.5/5 stars
Uncut	6/10
Under the Radar	7.5/10 stars

Afterglow received a score of 58 out of 100 on review aggregator Metacritic based on five critics' reviews, indicating "mixed or average" reception. Clash's Josh Gray commented that "Ásgeir's music is far too complex and interesting to start writing off as advert fodder. There's a depth to his work that deserves to be burrowed into. Afterglow itself works particularly well as a thoughtful sequel to In the Silence". Helen Clarke of MusicOMH called it "startling for its shift in sound and feel" as it "sounds like Bon Iver and Anohni were forced to join Hot Chip. It feels like a satisfyingly natural progression, but brave all the same".

Under the Radar wrote that "although the melodies have matured, on Afterglow, the 24-year-old gives a poetic, intimate look at the inner workings of his mind, thanks to collaborating with his father, poet Einar Georg Einarsson". Uncut felt that "although at times it can sound a little too carefully planned, there are some wonderful moments", while Mojo stated that "unfortunately, Afterglow further embraces, and is overshadowed by, his influences".

== Track listing ==
Afterglow track listing
No.	Title	Length
1.	"Afterglow"	4:50
2.	"Unbound"	4:07
3.	"Stardust"	3:44
4.	"Here Comes the Wave In"	3:20
5.	"Underneath It"	4:03
6.	"Nothing"	1:55
7.	"I Know You Know"	3:54
8.	"Dreaming"	4:42
9.	"New Day"	3:47
10.	"Fennir Yfir"	5:07
11.	"Hold"	4:02
Total length:		43:31

Afterglow deluxe edition tracks
No.	Title	Length
12.	"Afterglow" (alternate version)	4:48
13.	"Unbound" (alternate version)	3:51
14.	"Where Is My Mind?"	4:05
15.	"Trust"	3:10
Total length:		59:25

== Charts ==
=== Weekly charts ===
Weekly chart performance for Afterglow
Chart (2017)	Peak position
Australian Albums (ARIA)	22
Belgian Albums (Ultratop Flanders)	68
Belgian Albums (Ultratop Wallonia)	120
Dutch Albums (Album Top 100)	58
French Albums (SNEP)	103
German Albums (Offizielle Top 100)	100
Swiss Albums (Schweizer Hitparade)	50
UK Album Downloads (OCC)	88

=== Year-end charts ===
2017 year-end charts for Afterglow
Chart (2017)	Position
Icelandic Albums (Tónlistinn)	22

2018 year-end charts for Afterglow
Chart (2018)	Position
Icelandic Albums (Tónlistinn)	77
