= Dýrð í dauðaþögn =

Studio album by Ásgeir Trausti
- Released: September 2012
- Recorded: Hljóðriti Studios, Hafnarfjörður, Iceland
- Genre: Indie folk
- Length: 39:58
- Language: Icelandic
- Label: Sena
- Producer: Guðmundur Kristinn Jónsson

Ásgeir Trausti chronology
Dýrð í dauðaþögn (2012)	In the Silence (2013)

Singles from Dýrð í dauðaþögn
- 1. "Sumargestur"; 2. "Leyndarmál"; 3. "Dýrð í dauðaþögn" 4. "Nýfallið regn" 5. "Hærra"

Dýrð í dauðaþögn is the debut album by the Icelandic singer-songwriter Ásgeir Trausti. The album was recorded in three or four months in the summer of 2012. Most of the original Icelandic lyrics were written by Ásgeir's father.

The album reached number thirty-four in Denmark, and number one in Iceland where it has since been awarded triple platinum certification. It became the best selling debut album ever in Iceland. It is also reported to be owned by one in every ten people in Iceland.

As well as being nominated for the Best Album of the Year award at the 2012 Nordic Music Prize, the album won the Album of the Year at the 2012 Icelandic Music Awards and it received a Kraumur Award.

In the Silence, an English language version of the album, translated by the American musician John Grant, was released online on 28 October 2013, and physically on January 27, 2014. Only the vocal part is different from Dýrð í dauðaþögn.

== Track listing ==
All tracks are written by Ásgeir Trausti Einarsson and Einar Georg Einarsson except where noted.

No.	Title	Writer(s)	Length
1.	"Hærra"		3:29
2.	"Dýrð í dauðaþögn"	Ásgeir Trausti Einarsson, Júlíus Aðalsteinn Róbertsson	3:57
3.	"Sumargestur"		3:57
4.	"Leyndarmál"	Ásgeir Trausti Einarsson, Einar Georg Einarsson, Júlíus Aðalsteinn Róbertsson	3:39
5.	"Hljóða nótt"	Ásgeir Trausti Einarsson, Júlíus Aðalsteinn Róbertsson	3:58
6.	"Nýfallið regn"		3:39
7.	"Heimförin"		4:53
8.	"Að grafa sig í fönn"		4:13
9.	"Samhljómur"	Ásgeir Trausti Einarsson, Júlíus Aðalsteinn Róbertsson	4:25
10.	"Þennan dag"		3:49

== Personnel ==
Musicians

- Ásgeir Trausti Einarsson – vocals (all tracks), backing vocals (all tracks), guitar (all tracks), bass guitar (tracks 6, 9, 10), keyboards (tracks 1–9), piano (tracks 1, 3, 4, 5, 6, 7, 9, 10)
- Sigurður Guðmundsson – keyboards (tracks 1, 2, 3, 4, 6, 7, 8, 9), piano (track 2), bass guitar (tracks 2, 3, 4), backing vocals (track 3), harmonium (track 5)
- Kristinn Snær Agnarsson – drums (tracks 1, 2, 4, 6, 7, 9), percussion (track 3)
- Þorsteinn Einarsson – guitar (tracks 2, 3), backing vocals (tracks 3, 10)
- Samúel Jón Samúelsson – trombone (tracks 1, 2, 4, 7, 9)
- Kjartan Hákonarson – trumpet (tracks 1, 2, 4, 7, 9)
- Óskar Guðjónsson – saxophone (tracks 1, 2, 4, 7, 9)
- Valdimar Kolbeinn Sigurjónsson – bass guitar (track 1)
- Ingi Björn Ingasson – bass guitar (track 4)

Recording personnel

- Guðmundur Kristinn Jónsson – producer, recording, mixing
- Sigurður Guðmundsson – recording
- Kristinn Snær Agnarsson – recording
- Ásgeir Trausti Einarsson – recording

Other personnel

- Svarti Hrinhurinn – cover art
- Jónína de la Rosa – photography
- Bobby Breiðholt – design

== Charts ==
=== Weekly charts ===
2012–2013 weekly chart performance for Dýrð í dauðaþögn
Chart (2012–2013)	Peak position
Danish Albums (Hitlisten)	34
Icelandic Albums	1

2025 weekly chart performance for Dýrð í dauðaþögn
Chart (2025)	Peak position
Icelandic Albums (Tónlistinn)	1

=== Year-end charts ===
2016 year-end charts for Dýrð í dauðaþögn
Chart (2016)	Position
Icelandic Albums (Tónlistinn)	12

2017 year-end charts for Dýrð í dauðaþögn
Chart (2017)	Position
Icelandic Albums (Tónlistinn)	17

2018 year-end charts for Dýrð í dauðaþögn
Chart (2018)	Position
Icelandic Albums (Tónlistinn)	28

2019 year-end charts for Dýrð í dauðaþögn
Chart (2019)	Position
Icelandic Albums (Tónlistinn)	33

2020 year-end charts for Dýrð í dauðaþögn
Chart (2020)	Position
Icelandic Albums (Tónlistinn)	32

2021 year-end charts for Dýrð í dauðaþögn
Chart (2021)	Position
Icelandic Albums (Tónlistinn)	22

2022 year-end charts for Dýrð í dauðaþögn
Chart (2022)	Position
Icelandic Albums (Tónlistinn)	8

2023 year-end charts for Dýrð í dauðaþögn
Chart (2023)	Position
Icelandic Albums (Tónlistinn)	11

2024 year-end charts for Dýrð í dauðaþögn
Chart (2024)	Position
Icelandic Albums (Tónlistinn)	11

2025 year-end charts for Dýrð í dauðaþögn
Chart (2025)	Position
Icelandic Albums (Tónlistinn)	11

== Certifications ==
Region	Certification	Certified units/sales
Iceland (FHF)	4× Platinum	40,000
