= Innocence Is Kinky =

Studio album by Jenny Hval
- Released: 19 April 2013
- Genre: Art pop, experimental rock
- Length: 41:52
- Label: Rune Grammofon
- Producer: John Parish

Jenny Hval chronology
| Viscera (2011) | Innocence Is Kinky (2013) | Apocalypse, girl (2015) |

Innocence Is Kinky is the fourth studio album by Norwegian musician Jenny Hval, and the second under her own name. It was released in April 2013 under Rune Grammofon. The title track was released as a music video directed by Zia Anger.

== Background ==
Innocence Is Kinky is Jenny Hval's second studio album under her own name, following Viscera (2011). It originates from the music she composed for a screening of Carl Theodor Dreyer's silent film The Passion of Joan of Arc, which she later developed into an audiovisual installation. The album is produced by John Parish.

== Critical reception ==
Professional ratings
Aggregate scores
| Source | Rating |
|---|---|
| AnyDecentMusic? | 8.4/10 |
| Metacritic | 87/100 |
Review scores
| Source | Rating |
| AllMusic | 4/5 stars |
| Beats Per Minute | 85% |
| Drowned in Sound | 8/10 |
| Exclaim! | 8/10 |
| Pitchfork | 7.8/10 |
| PopMatters | 9/10 |
| Q | 4/5 stars |
| Sputnikmusic | 4.7/5 |
| Tiny Mix Tapes | 4.5/5 stars |
| The 405 | 9/10 |

According to the review aggregator Metacritic, Innocence Is Kinky received "universal acclaim" based on a weighted average score of 87 out of 100 from 12 critic scores.

=== Accolades ===
Year-end lists for Innocence Is Kinky
| Publication | List | Rank | Ref. |
|---|---|---|---|
| Cokemachineglow | Top 30 Albums 2013 | 9 | |
| MusicOMH | musicOMH's Top 100 Albums of 2013 | 100 | |
| Tiny Mix Tapes | Favorite 50 Albums of 2013 | 40 | |

== Track listing ==
All tracks are written by Jenny Hval.

| No. | Title | Length |
|---|---|---|
| 1. | "Innocence Is Kinky" | 4:26 |
| 2. | "Mephisto in the Water" | 4:03 |
| 3. | "I Called" | 3:24 |
| 4. | "Oslo Oedipus" | 2:42 |
| 5. | "Renée Falconetti of Orléans" | 4:29 |
| 6. | "Give Me That Sound" | 2:08 |
| 7. | "I Got No Strings" | 5:22 |
| 8. | "Is There Anything on Me That Doesn't Speak?" | 3:41 |
| 9. | "Amphibious, Androgynous" | 4:36 |
| 10. | "Death of the Author" | 3:35 |
| 11. | "The Seer" | 3:25 |
| Total length: | | 41:52 |

== Personnel ==
- Jenny Hval – arranger, composer, drum machine, engineer, guitar, keyboards, primary artist, sampling, vocals, background vocals
- Ali Chant – engineer, mixer
- John Dent – mastering
- Stefan Hambrook – engineer
- Chris Kaus – quotation author
- Kyrre Laastad – arranger, drum machine, drums, keyboards, percussion
- Ole Henrik Moe – string arrangements, viola, violin
- John Parish – banjo, bass, guitar, keyboards, mixing, producer, trombone
- Espen Reinertsen – saxophone
- Kari Rønnekleiv – violin
- Håvard Volden – arranger, drum machine, acoustic guitar, electric guitar, keyboards
