= Laugarbakki =

- village
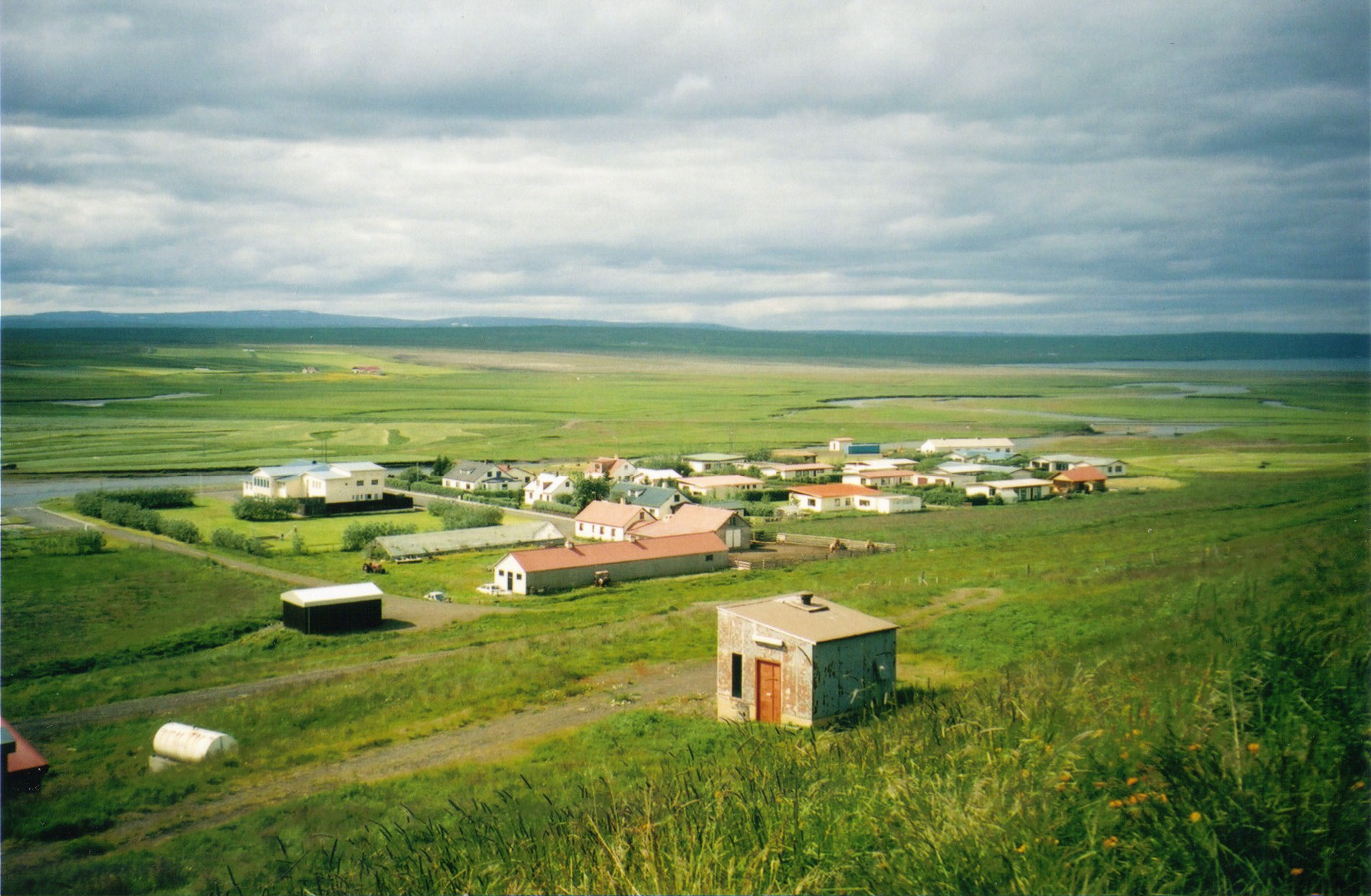

- Coordinates: 65°20′03″N 20°53′00″W
- Country: Iceland

Population (1 January 2018)
  - Total: 57

Laugarbakki (Icelandic pronunciation: [ˈlœyːɣarˌpahcɪ]) is a village in Iceland located on the east road of the Miðfjarðará river, with a population of around 57 inhabitants in 2018.
