= Apocalypse, Girl =

Studio album by Jenny Hval
- Released: 9 June 2015
- Genre: Art pop; experimental folk
- Length: 38:44
- Label: Sacred Bones; Su Tissue
- Producer: Lasse Marhaug

Jenny Hval chronology
Innocence Is Kinky (2013)	Apocalypse, Girl (2015)	Blood Bitch (2016)

Apocalypse, Girl (stylized as Apocalypse, girl) is the fifth studio album by Norwegian musician Jenny Hval, released on June 9, 2015 through Sacred Bones and Su Tissue Records.

Music videos have been made for "That Battle Is Over", "Sabbath" and "Take Care of Yourself".

== Critical reception ==
Professional ratings
Aggregate scores
Source	Rating
AnyDecentMusic?	7.9/10
Metacritic	79/100
Review scores
Source	Rating
Consequence of Sound	B
Financial Times	4/5 stars
The Guardian	4/5 stars
Mojo	3/5 stars
NME	7/10
The Observer	4/5 stars
Pitchfork	7.9/10
Rolling Stone	3.5/5 stars
Spin	8/10
Uncut	8/10

At Metacritic, which assigns a normalized rating out of 100 to reviews from mainstream publications, the album received an average score of 79, based on 20 reviews, indicating "generally favorable reviews". Tiny Mix Tapes said "both her songs and her subject matter hold back from shocking the listener by virtue of their content, and yet they make a startling impact—creating a headspace that leads to nowhere in the same moment that it paves the way to salvation." The Guardian wrote: "The album wrestles with many of the same ideas [as Innocence Is Kinky], set against an erotic sonic futurescape of spoken word, warped choirs, sci-fi electronics and her typically pillow-soft vocals.... It’s provocative, but these are ideas rarely heard in pop, which makes it all the more compelling." Consequence of Sound described the album as "an understated mesh of free jazz and artful improvisation, guiding us out of the nightmare capitalism has dreamed for us and into sexual liberation and individual rebirth." Rolling Stone said "Apocalypse, girl is a shift toward orchestral pop after the noisy rock of 2013's Innocence Is Kinky, but Hval loses none of her avant-garde inclinations in the process." Pitchfork said: "Like all of her best work, it finds new ways to provoke, and new parts of your brain to light up."

=== Accolades ===
Publication	Accolade	Rank	Ref.
Drowned in Sound	Favorite Albums of the Year 2015	10	
The Guardian	The Best Albums of 2015	32	
Pitchfork	The 50 Best Albums of 2015	42	
Pitchfork	The 200 Best Albums of the 2010s	88	
The Quietus	Best Albums of 2015	16	
The Skinny	The 50 Best Albums of 2015	6	
Sputnikmusic	Top 50 Albums of 2015	40	
Stereogum	The 50 Best Albums of 2015	14	
Tiny Mix Tapes	Favorite 50 Music Releases of 2015	23	
Vulture	The 10 Best Albums of 2015	3	

== Track listing ==
All tracks are written by Jenny Hval, except where noted.

No.	Title	Length
1.	"Kingsize"	2:25
2.	"Take Care of Yourself"	3:01
3.	"That Battle Is Over"	4:35
4.	"White Underground" (Hval, Lasse Marhaug)	2:20
5.	"Heaven"	4:53
6.	"Why This?"	3:37
7.	"Some Days"	0:41
8.	"Sabbath"	3:46
9.	"Angels and Anaemia"	3:27
10.	"Holy Land" (Hval, Marhaug)	9:59
Total length:		38:44

Notes

- "Kingsize" quotes and translated the poem "En Stor Sten af en Lille sten at Være" by Mette Moestrup.

== Personnel ==
Credits adapted from the liner notes of Apocalypse, Girl.

- Jenny Hval – vocals, effects, keyboards, arrangements, recording
- Håvard Volden – guitar, bass
- Kyrre Laastad – drums
- Øystein Moen – synths, mellotron
- Okkyung Lee – cello
- Thor Harris – various mallets, percussion
- Rhodri Davies – harp
- Lara Myrvoll – beats (track 5)
- Syster Alma – sampling
- Lasse Marhaug – production, mixing, arrangements, recording
- Rob Halverson – additional recording
- Sam Grant – additional recording
- Marcus Schmickler – mastering
- Zia Anger – photography
- Lisbeth Vogler – cover

== Charts ==
Chart (2015)	Peak position
Dutch Albums (Album Top 100)	81
