= Lasse Marhaug =

Norwegian musician (born 1974)

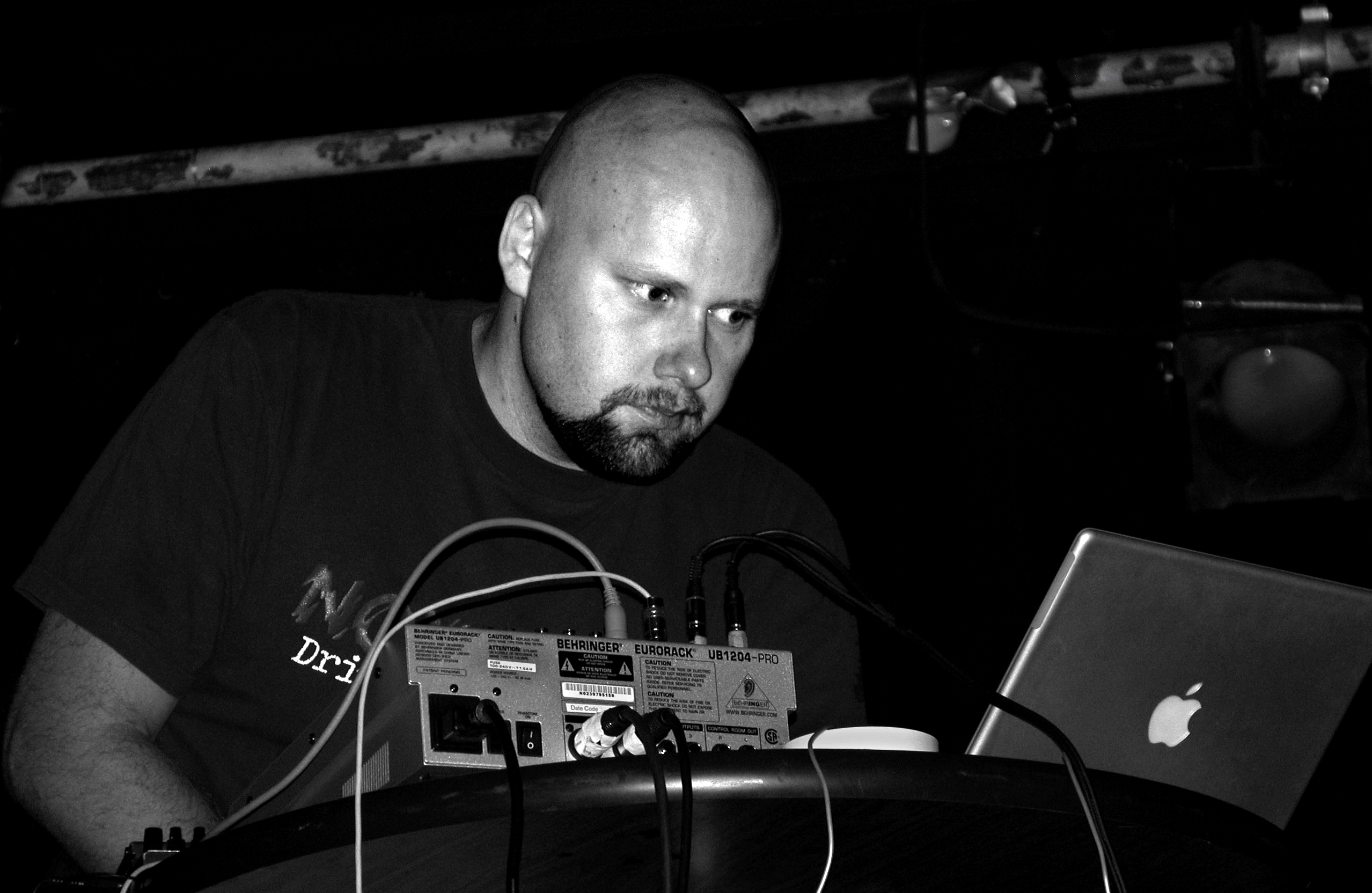
- Empty Bottle, Chicago, 23 September 2004; photo courtesy Seth Tisue

Background information
- Also known as: A73, Egoproblem, Herb Mullin, Vassbotn
- Born: 10 September 1974 (age 51); Steigen, Norway
- Origin: Trondheim
- Genres: Noise; free improvisation; free jazz; extreme metal; drone music
- Occupations: Musician, audio production, cover designer, label owner, publisher
- Instruments: Electronics, laptop, tapes, vocals
- Years active: 1990–present
- Labels: Jazzassin Records; Pica Disk; Prisma Records; Rune Grammofon; Smalltown Supersound; TWR Tapes
- Website: lassemarhaug.no

Lasse Marhaug (born 10 September 1974) is a Norwegian musician who primarily works in the field of noise music but frequently drifts into other areas such as improvisation, jazz, rock and extreme metal. Marhaug has also been involved in creating music for theatre, dance, art installations and video art. Active since the early 1990s, he has participated as a performer and composer on over 200 releases in CD, vinyl and cassette tape formats. He currently resides in Oslo.

Marhaug tours extensively, and is a frequent collaborator. He currently participates in the projects Nash Kontroll (with Mats Gustafsson and Dror Feiler), DEL, and Testicle Hazard. Defunct projects include Jazkamer/Jazzkammer, Origami Replika and Lasse Marhaug Band. Other collaborative partners include Tore Honoré Bøe, Marc Broude, Anla Courtis, Carlos Giffoni, John Hegre, Kommissar Hjuler und Frau, Merzbow, Paal Nilssen-Love, Nordvargr, Maja Ratkje, The Skull Defekts, Ronnie Sundin, Sunn O))), Ken Vandermark, Jon Wesseltoft, Runhild Gammelsæter, John Wiese, Jenny Hval and Kelly Lee Owens.

== History ==
In 2007, Norwegian newspaper Dagsavisen rated Marhaug's album The Shape of Rock to Come as number 19 on their list of the best albums in Norwegian history.

In 2011, he started publishing the fanzine Personal Best on his own publishing company Marhaug Forlag.

In 2013, PAN GU's Primeval Man Born of the Cosmic Egg, Marhaug's collaboration with The Observatory's Leslie Low, made it to SPIN's Top 20 Avant albums of 2013.

Marhaug currently runs the labels TWR Tapes and Pica Disk. He also runs Prisma Records with Lars Mørch Finborud which releases music performed at the Henie-Onstad Art Centre.

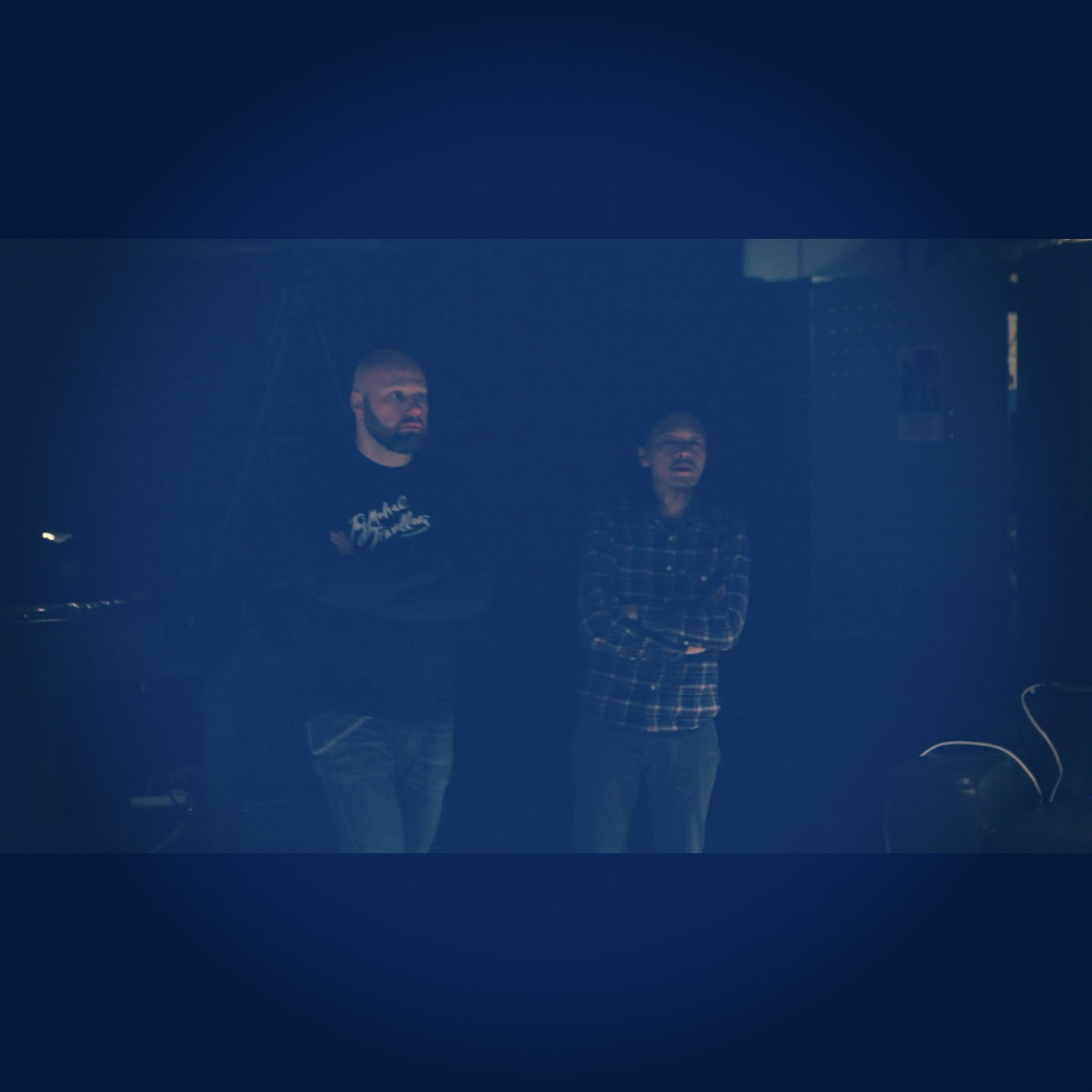
Pan Gu (Lasse Marhaug & Leslie Low of The Observatory) in Norway, 2013

== Selected discography ==
- Science Fiction Room Service (1996)
- Alive! (Live Recordings 1998–2006) (2007)
- Tapes 1990–1999 (2007)
- Quality Control (2007)
- Ear Era (2008)
- Virginia Plane (with Bruce Russell) (2013, The Spring Press)
- Context (2022)
