= Susanna Wallumrød discography =

Susanna and the Magical Orchestra

- 2004: Jolene (Rune Grammofon) Promo Single
- 2004: List of Lights and Buoys (Rune Grammofon)
- 2006: Melody Mountain (Rune Grammofon)
- 2009: 3 (Rune Grammofon, 2009)

Susanna

- 2007: Sonata Mix Dwarf Cosmos (Rune Grammofon)
- 2008: Flower of Evil (Rune Grammofon)
- 2012: Wild Dog (Rune Grammofon)
- 2013: The Forester (SusannaSonata), Susanna & Ensemble neoN
- 2016: Triangle (SusannaSonata)
- 2018: Go Dig My Grave (SusannaSonata)
- 2021: LIVE – Susanna & David Wallumrød (SusannaSonata)
- 2022: Elevation Extended EP (SusannaSonata), Susanna featuring Stina Stjern & Delphine Dora
- 2023: Baudelaire & Orchestra (SusannaSonata)
- 2024: The Harmony of Evening EP (SusannaSonata)
- 2024: Meditations on Love (SusannaSonata)

Susanna Wallumrød

- 2011: Jeg vil hjem til menneskene, Susanna Wallumrød synger Gunvor Hofmo (Grappa Music), with Morten Qvenild, Ståle Storløkken, Hans Magnus Ryan, Jo Berger Myhre & Erland Dahlen

With the Brotherhood of Our Lady

- 2019: Garden of Earthly Delights (SusannaSonata)

The Magical Orchestra has also contributed on the following compilations

- 2003: Money will Ruin Everything (Rune Grammofon)
- 2006: Until Human Voices Wake us, and we Drown (Rune Grammofon)

A selection of other albums Susanna has contributed on

- 2006 FRIKO: The Journey to Mandoola (C+C RECORDS)
- 2006 The White Birch: Come Up for Air (Rune Grammofon) – backing vocals on "Seer Believer", "June" and New Kingdom".
- 2008 Various: 50th Anniversary Tribute to the Artist Known as Prince (C+C Records) – backing vocals on "Purple Rain" (with The White Birch) and "Condition of the Heart" (album version).
- 2009 RAH Band: Definitive RAH Band Collection (Tool Boxx) – vocals on "Living for the Nitelife".
- 2011 Giovanna Pessi: If Grief Could Wait (ECM)
- 2014 Hval and Wallumrød: Meshes of Voice (SusannaSonata)
