= Ensemble neoN =

Contemporary classical music ensemble

Ensemble neoN is a contemporary classical music ensemble.

== History ==
The ensemble was founded by Julian Skar and Jan Martin Smørdal in 2008.

== Members ==
Members include conductor Magnus Loddgard, dancer-soprano Silje Aker Johnsen who was awarded the 2013 Performer of the Year award by the Norwegian Society of Composers, and violinist Karin Hellqvist who was awarded the Interpreter's prize from the Swedish Society of Composers in January 2016.

== Awards ==
Ensemble neoN was awarded the Spellemannprisen for their albums The Forester (2013, with Susanna Wallumrød) and Neon (2016). The ensemble was further awarded the 2017 "Performer of the year" award by the Norwegian Society of Composers. They were also awarded the Pauline Hall prize in 2011.

== List of recordings ==
- 2013: The Forester (with Susanna)
- 2016: Neon
- 2019: Through a network of illuminated streets (composed by Martin Rane Bauck)
- 2019: Niblock / Lamb (composed by Phill Niblock and Catherine Lamb)
