= Julian Skar =

Norwegian composer

Julian Skar (born 1981) is a Norwegian composer and multi-media artist.

== Career ==
Skar studied composition at the Norwegian Academy of Music with Asbjørn Schaathun, Rolf Wallin and Ivar Frounberg. Skar has also studied composition at the Universität der Künste in Berlin with Daniel Ott and Wolfgang Heiniger, focusing on new technology and music theatre. Skar has also studied piano and composition at the Grieg Academy in Bergen.

Skar's compositional output includes a number of works within electronic music and music theatre. Since his student days, Skar has maintained an equal footing in the contemporary as well as pop music worlds. This has resulted in a diverse output that includes releases with artists such as Nils Bech and Susanna Wallumrød.

In 2008, Skar founded Ensemble neoN with Jan Martin Smørdal, and is currently the one half of the ensemble’s artistic directorship as well as its in-house composer.

== Production ==
=== Selected works ===
- Exhaust and Renew: For piano solo 2016
- Paralleller og paradokser for piano trio 2013
- Flow my tears for Soprano and ensemble 2013/2014
- Transcend and transform, piano concerto featuring soloist Ole Kristian Bye and the Trondheim Sinfonietta". 2012
- Lys 2010
- Spor 2010
- Arie 2009
- Essay om ekskludering for typewriter, percussion and electronics 2008.
- Schrieb 2008.
- Who´s there for Cello, Video and electronics 2007

==== Stage productions ====
- Ikkje sant, multi-media production 2013.
- Ballettlaboratoriet 2011
- Schrieb 2008.
- Visitt dance production 2012.
- Jamsis 2010.
- Neverland theatre 2010
- Gokk theatre 2008

=== Discography ===
- Susanna Wallumrød and Ensemble neoN, The Forester (2013)
- Nils Bech, Look Inside (2012)
