= Magical Orchestra =

Norwegian band

Susanna and the Magical Orchestra
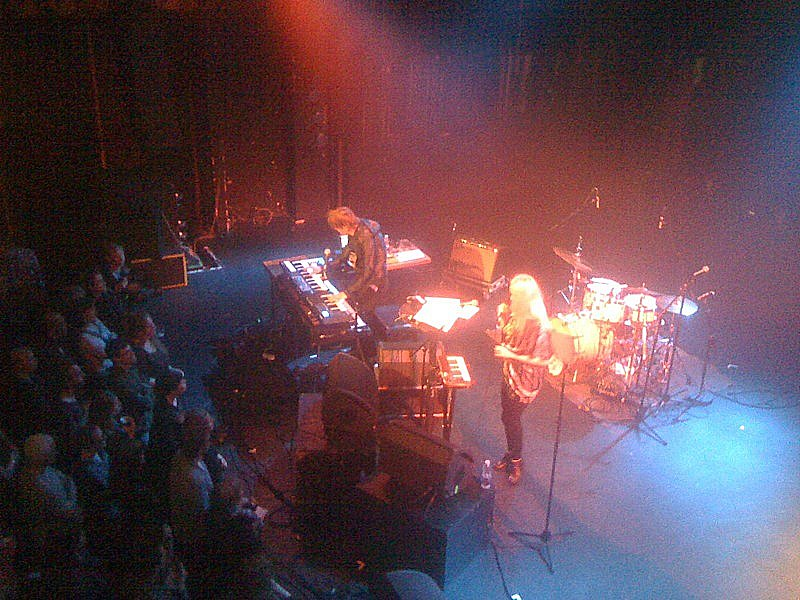
- Susanna and the Magical Orchestra in Copenhagen, 2010

Background information
- Origin: Kongsberg, Norway
- Genres: Indie Pop & Jazz
- Years active: 2000–present
- Label: Rune Grammofon
- Members: Susanna Wallumrød; Morten Qvenild
- Website: Official website

Susanna and the Magical Orchestra is the moniker of singer Susanna Wallumrød and keyboard player Morten Qvenild. Their style of music can be described as quiet, slow pop mixed with elements from electronica and jazz. Susanna has a very distinct, clear and cool voice that stands much on its own, only accompanied by Morten on various keyboard instruments such as acoustic piano, synthesizers and even harpsichord and church organ. The duo is mostly known for their highly personal interpretations of well known songs such as Dolly Parton's "Jolene" and Leonard Cohen's "Hallelujah".

Qvenild is also a member in many other bands, including The National Bank, Solveig Slettahjell's Slow Motion Orchestra and his own piano trio In the Country. He is a former member of the bands Jaga Jazzist and Shining. Susanna is the sister of the drummer Fredrik Wallumrød and the pianist Christian Wallumrød, and the pianist David Wallumrød is her cousin. She also releases music under the name Susanna, and her full name Susanna Wallumrød.

The duo released their debut album, List of Lights and Buoys, on the label Rune Grammofon in 2004, though work on the album began a couple of years earlier.

The album was produced by Jaga Jazzist percussionist Andreas Mjøs, and Wallumrød's husband, prominent Norwegian producer and composer Helge Sten/Deathprod who has also produced albums for bands such as Motorpsycho and Supersilent.

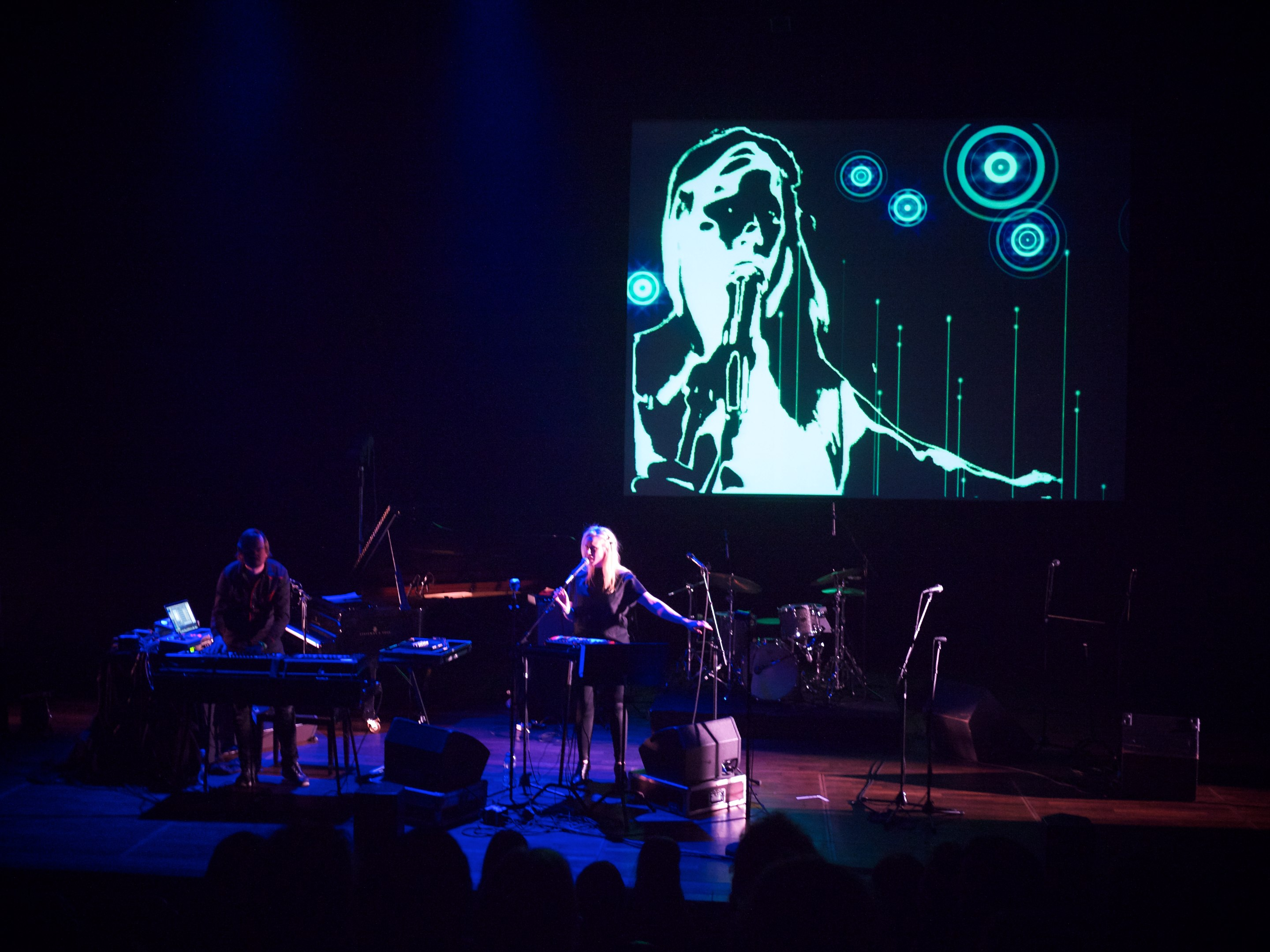
Susanna And The Magical Orchestra at Lillehammer 2010.

Their second album Melody Mountain was released September 2006, and contains slow, low-key cover versions of songs by various artists such as Leonard Cohen, Prince, Bob Dylan, Joy Division, AC/DC and Kiss. Their 3rd album simply called "3" was released in August 2009 and contains two cover versions - Roy Harper's song "Another Day" from the album Flat Baroque and Berserk and Subdivisions by the Canadian group Rush.

Susanna and the Magical Orchestra has toured across Europe since 2004, but also in Japan, China and the USA.

== Discography ==
- 2004: Jolene (Rune Grammofon) Promo Single
- 2004: List of Lights and Buoys (Rune Grammofon)
- 2006: Melody Mountain (Rune Grammofon)
- 2009: 3 (Rune Grammofon, 2009)
