= 2007 in Norwegian music =

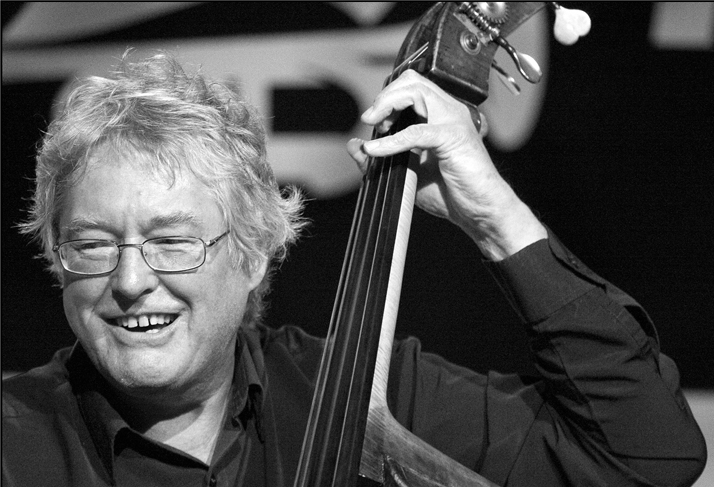
Arild Andersen at the North Sea Jazz Festival, July 2007.

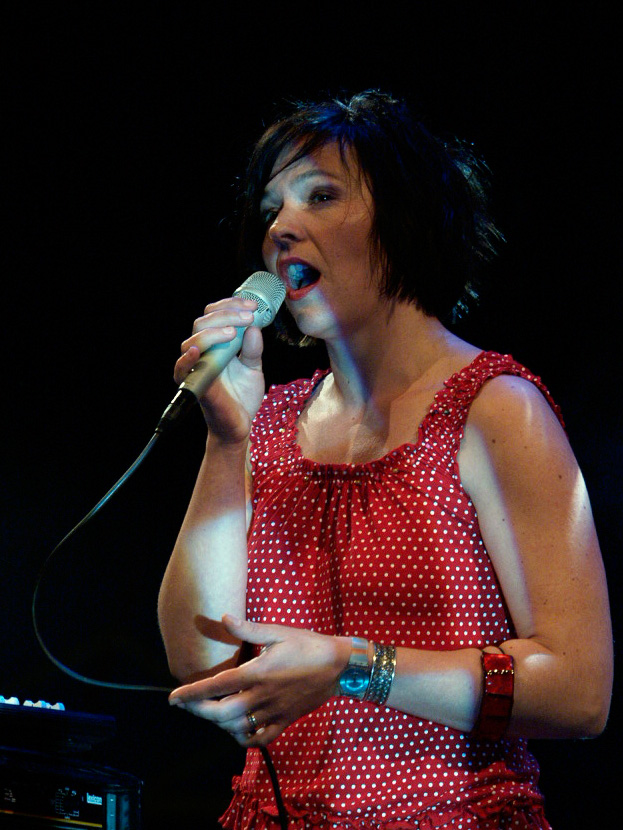
Eldbjørg Raknes at the Moers Festival.

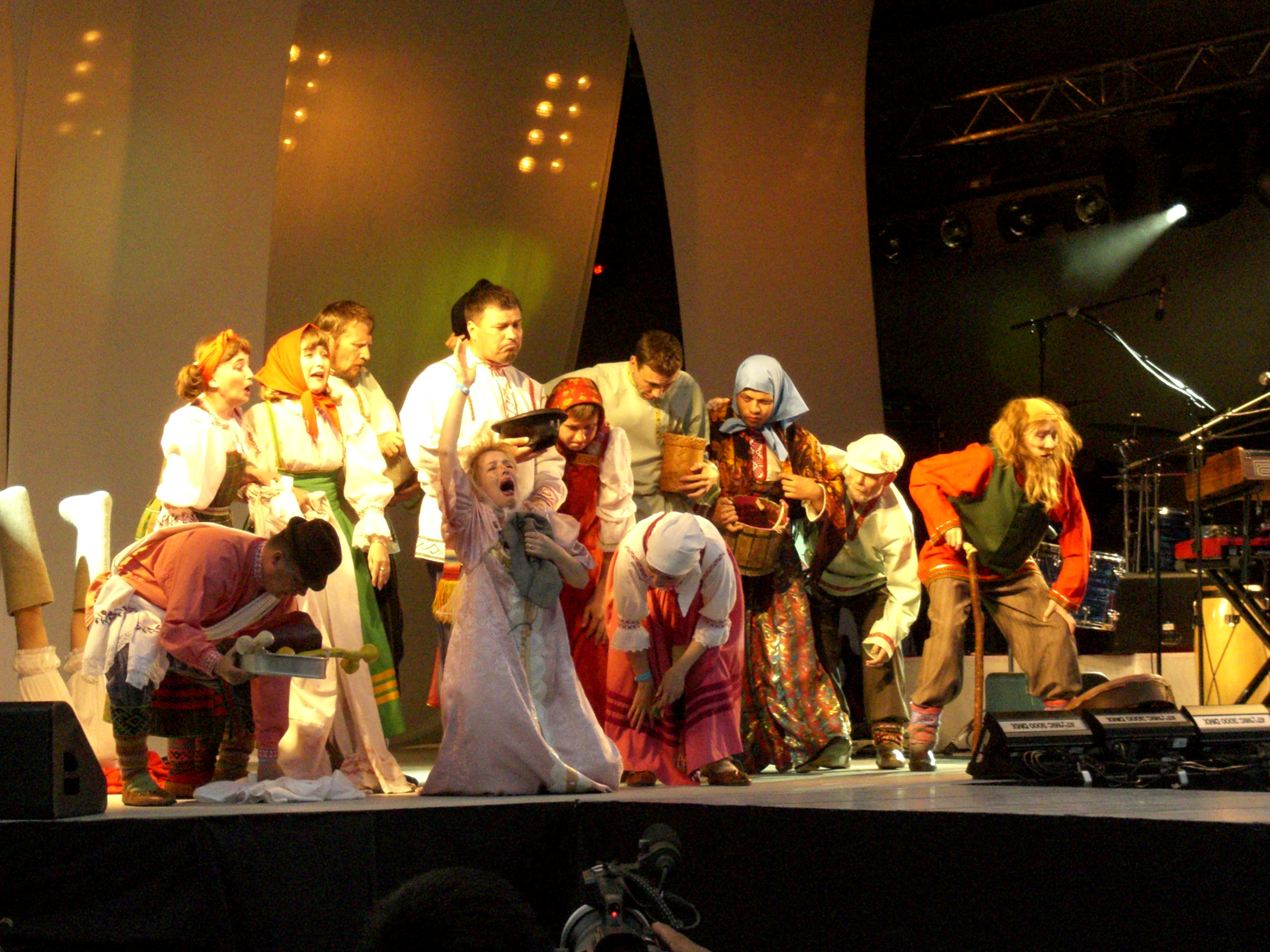
Riddu Riđđu.

The following is a list of notable events and releases of the year 2007 in Norwegian music.

== Events ==
=== January ===
- 17 – The 2nd Ice Music Festival Festival started in Geilo (January 17–19).
- 22 – The 20th Nordlysfestivalen started in Tromsø (January 22 – 28).

=== February ===
- 1 – The 10th Polarjazz Festival started in Longyearbyen (February 1 – 4).
- 8 – Kristiansund Opera Festival opened (February 8 – 24).

=== March ===
- 30
  - The 34th Vossajazz started at Vossavangen (March 30 – April 1).
  - Snorre Bjerck was awarded Vossajazzprisen 2007.
- 31 – Berit Opheim performs the commissioned work Ein engel går stilt for Vossajazz 2007.

=== April ===
- 26 – Bergenfest started in Bergen (April 26 – May 1).

=== May ===
- 23
  - The start of Bergen International Music Festival Festspillene i Bergen (May 23 – June 6).
  - The 35th Nattjazz started in Bergen (May 23 – June 2).

=== June ===
- 14 – Norwegian Wood started in Oslo (June 14 – 17).

=== July ===
- 4 – The 43nd Kongsberg Jazzfestival started in Kongsberg (July 4 – 7).
- 16
  - The 47th Moldejazz started in Molde (July 16 – 21).
  - Arve Henriksen received the Radka Toneff Memorial Award at Moldejazz opening concert.

=== August ===
- 2 – The 20th Notodden Blues Festival started in Notodden (August 2 – 5).
- 8 – The 21st Sildajazz started in Haugesund (August 8 – 12).
- 13 – The 22nd Oslo Jazzfestival started in Oslo (August 13 – 19).
- 29 – The 3rd Punktfestivalen started in Kristiansand (August 29 – September 1).
- 31 – The 4th Ekkofestival started in Bergen (August 31 – September 1).

=== September ===
- 13 – The DølaJazz started in Lillehammer (September 13 – 16).
- 28 – The 29th Ultima Oslo Contemporary Music Festival opened in Oslo (September 28 – Oktober 14).

=== October ===
- 11 – The 6th Insomnia Festival started in Tromsø (October 11 – 13).
- 31 – The Oslo World Music Festival started in Oslo (October 31 – November 4).

=== November ===
- 1 – The 2nd Barents Jazz, Tromsø International Jazz Festival started (November 1 – 3).

=== December ===
- 11 – The Nobel Peace Prize Concert was held at Telenor Arena.

== Albums released ==
=== January ===
Day	Album	Artist	Label	Notes	Ref.
29	Norwegian Song	Dag Arnesen Trio	Resonant Music		

=== August ===
Day	Album	Artist	Label	Notes	Ref.
20	Sonata Mix Dwarf Cosmos	Susanna	Rune Grammofon	Produced by Deathprod	

=== Unknown date ===
A

Eivind Aarset

- Sonic Codex (Jazzland Recordings)

== Deaths ==
July

- 12 — Robert Burås, guitarist for Madrugada and My Midnight Creeps (born 1975).

September

- 5 — Thomas Hansen, Norwegian musician known as "Saint Thomas", combination of prescribed drugs (born 1976).

November

- 16 — Grethe Kausland, actress and singer, lung cancer (born 1947).

== See also ==
- 2007 in Norway
- Music of Norway
- Norway in the Eurovision Song Contest 2007
