= Solo Cissokho =

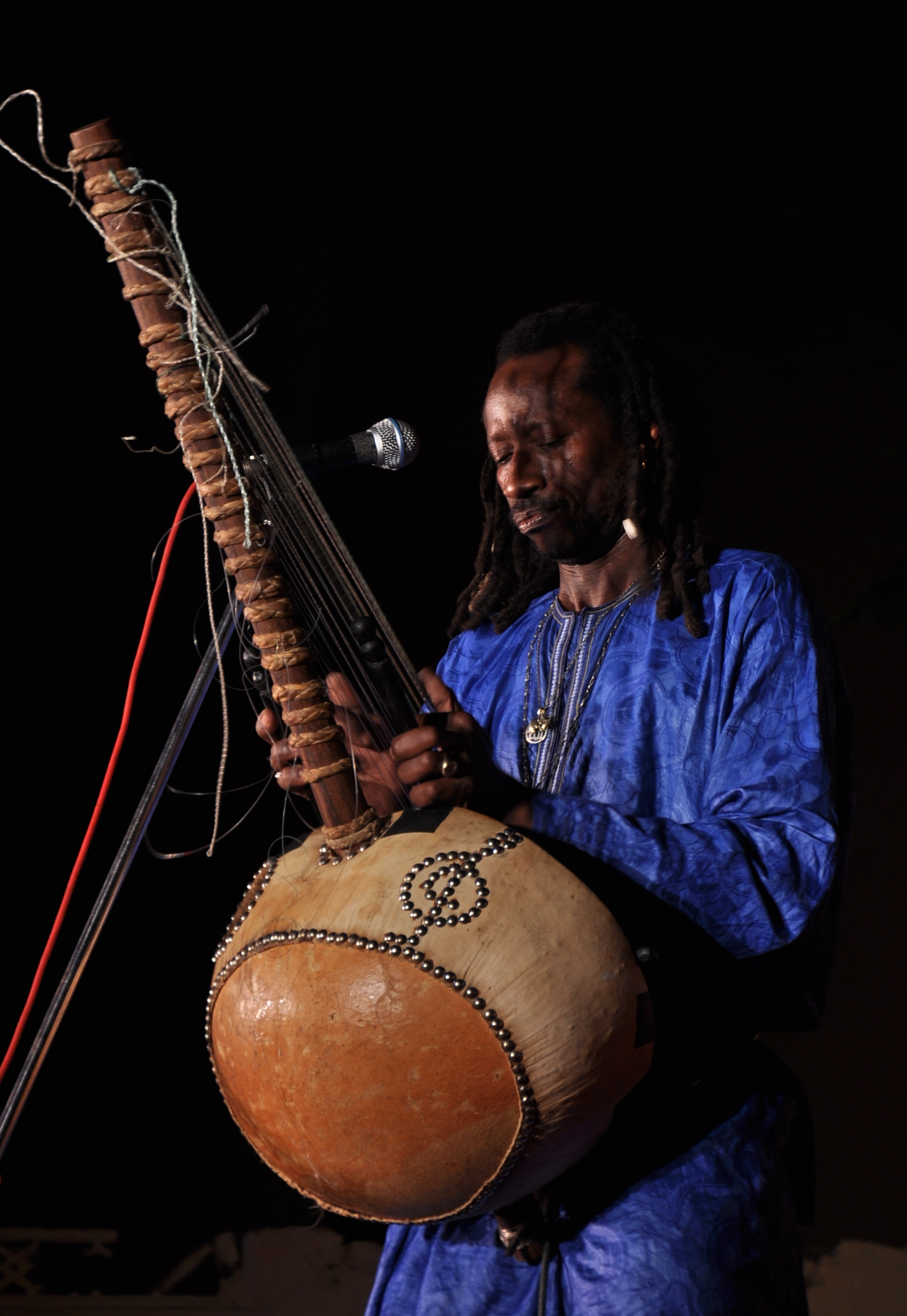
- Solo Cissokho 2012

Background information
- Born: Solo Cissokho; 1963; Ziguinchor, Casamance
- Origin: Senegal
- Died: May 4, 2019 (aged 55–56) Oslo, Norway
- Genres: Jazz, Mbalax, World
- Occupation: Musician
- Instruments: Kora, djembe, guitar, bass, vocals
- Years active: 1995–2019
- Formerly of: Ellika & Solo, Jalikunda, Cissokho System

Solo Cissokho (1963 – May 4, 2019) was a Norwegian/Senegalese Jazz and Mbalax musician known for playing the Kora. Born into a Senegalese griot family in Ziguinchor, Casamance, Solo continued the family tradition of Kora playing at a young age.

== Biography ==
Solo Cissokho, born Solo Cissokho in 1963, hailed from a family of musicians, including Kausu Kouyate and Seckou Keita. In his early years, he learned to play the Kora, mastering additional instruments like Djembe, Guitar, and Bass. His musical journey led him to France and England before settling in Norway in 1995.

In 1996, Cissokho recorded the album Frå Senegal til Setesdal with Kouame Sereba, Kirsten Bråten Berg, and Bjørgulv Straume. A significant turning point occurred in 1998 when an impromptu collaborative session with Swedish folk musician Ellika Frisell resulted in the album Tretakt Takissaba, winning the BBC World Music Award for Boundary Crossing.

He formed 'Jalikunda Cissokho' which included members from the Cissokho family. They toured across the UK, and performed at notable events and festivals such as Womad and the Glastonbury Festival and released an album.

Cissokho contributed to various musical projects and albums and has collaborated with artists like Ellika Frisell, Youssou N'Dour and Ali Farka Touré, showcasing his versatility in genres ranging from world music to Jazz.

== Discography ==
=== Albums ===
- Alal (1998)
- Tretakt Takissaba with Ellika Frisell (2002)
- Abaraká! Tack! – with Ellika Frisell (2005)
- Now with Ellika Frisell and Rafael Sida (2013)
- Contrebande with Den Fule (2013)
- Solo & Indrė with Indrė Jurgelevičiūtė (2015)

=== Collaborative works ===
- Frå Senegal til Setesdal with Miki N'Doye Orchestra – (1997)
- Joko (2002) with Miki N'Doye Orchestra (2002)
- Combonations (2002)
- Lindiane with Jalikunda Cissokho – (2002)
- Sangen Om Yebo with Geirr Lystrup – (2002)
- Awards For World Music (2003)
- Fulanimesse with Mannskoret Herrer and Terje Baugerød – (2005)
- Dunya with ComboNations (2017)
