= Silje Aker Johnsen =

Norwegian soprano and dancer

Silje Marie Aker Johnsen
- Occupations: Soprano and dancer

Silje Marie Aker Johnsen is a Norwegian soprano and dancer. She is a member of Ensemble neoN, and a former member of Det Norske Solistkor.

As a singer she has been named Performer of the year twice by the Norwegian Society of Composers: individually in 2013, and with Ensemble neoN in 2017. With Ensemble neoN she was also awarded Spellemannprisen in 2016.

== Early life and education ==
Silje Aker Johnsen hails from Tønsberg, and holds a PhD degree from the Opera Academy at the Oslo National Academy of the Arts.

== Style ==
Aker Johnsen is a classically trained singer, and has also worked as a contemporary dancer, in the Polish Dance Theatre. Her current activity reflects this versatile background, as some of her more recent work often can be classified as contemporary opera with an extended physical interpretation. The contribution of Johnsen to Ensemble neoN is more inclined towards experimental vocalizing within the contemporary classical realm.

== Selected performances ==
Silje Aker Johnsen appeared in Korall Korall, a "baby opera" aimed at toddlers, with music by Maja Ratkje.

In 2017–2018, Aker Johnsen starred three times at the Norwegian National Opera and Ballet: in Synne Skouen's opera Ballerina, which was based on a play by Arne Skouen, in Femte Rad Produksjoner's Simon, and in the apparently autobiographical Her, a solo performance considered to be a combination of theatre dance and contemporary opera.

== Awards ==
- 2008: Fartein Valen scholarship
- 2013: Norwegian Society of Composers' 2013 Performer of the Year
- 2016: Awarded Spellemannprisen for the album Neon (as part of Ensemble neoN)
- 2016: Nominated for Spellemannprisen for the album Ophelias: Death By Water Singing (with other performers)
- 2017: Norwegian Society of Composers' 2017 Performer of the Year (as part of Ensemble neoN)
