= Magnus Loddgard =

Norwegian conductor

Magnus Loddgard (born 4 May 1979 in Trondheim) is a Norwegian conductor, pianist and vocal coach, based in Berlin.

== Career ==
As a conductor, Loddgard has worked with Oslo Philharmonic Orchestra, The Norwegian State Opera, The Norwegian Radio Orchestra, Trondheim Symphony Orchestra, Kristiansand Symphony Orchestra, Oslo Sinfonietta, Trondheim Sinfonietta, Bodø Sinfonietta, Ensemble Ernst and the Dresdner Sinfoniker.

Cooperation with the Municipal Theatre, Ho Chi Minh City where he conducted The Nutcracker, in 2012, and The Magic Flute 2013 and 2014.

In 2002 Loddgard founded Fjøsfestivalen and served as its director until 2014.

Since 2008 he is conductor of Ensemble neoN, a new music ensemble based in Oslo. They received a Norwegian Grammy (Spellemannprisen) for their 2013 album The Forester with Susanna & Ensemble neoN.

From 2005 to 2012 Loddgard was a vocal coach and assistant conductor in the Norwegian State Opera.

He has appeared as a piano soloist with the Trondheim Symphony Orchestra, Kristiansand Symphony Orchestra and The Norwegian Radio Orchestra, with whom he recorded Jon Øyvind Ness’ piano concerto Sunburst in 2013 – a recording which was nominated for the Spellemann Award.
