= Andreas Stensland Løwe =

Norwegian jazz pianist

Andreas Løwe
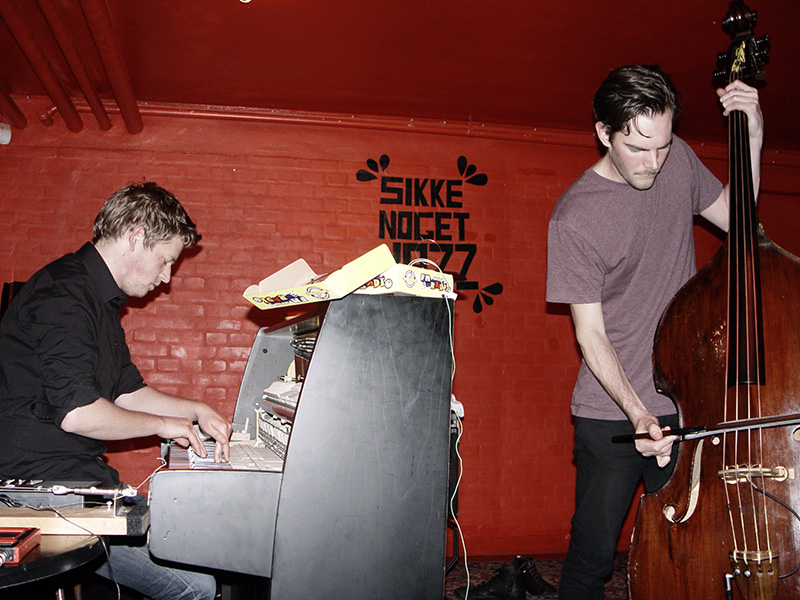
- Andreas Stensland Løwe and Jo Berger Myhre in Aarhus, Denmark (2009)

Background information
- Born: Andreas Stensland Løwe; 14 October 1983 (age 43); Larvik, Vestfold, Norway
- Genre: Jazz
- Occupations: Musician, composer
- Instruments: Piano, keyboards
- Labels: Hubro Music
- Website: www.splashgirl.no

Andreas Stensland Løwe (born 14 October 1983 in Larvik, Norway) is a Norwegian jazz pianist from Hedrum Municipality, living in Oslo, with a taste for electronic sound processing. He is known from bands like Splashgirl, Silent Velcro and The Captain & Me, and collaborations with artists like Hanne Kolstø, Frida Ånnevik and Susanna Wallumrød.

== Biography ==
As a major composer and pianist in Splashgirl Løwe has played a series of concerts in places from Japan in the east to Seattle in the west, and he has released several albums. He also has appeared as a composer of a number of commissioned works, including for the Tape to Zero Festival in Oslo, and composed music for stage and movies.

== Discography ==
With Splashgirl

- 2007: Doors. Keys. (AIM Records)
- 2009: Arbor (Hubro Music)
- 2011: Splashgirl / Huntsville (Hubro Music)
- 2011: Pressure (Hubro Music)
- 2013: Field Day Rituals (Hubro Music)

With Xtet Project

- 2009: Phase First (Bushbaby Records)

With Rutger Zuydervelt

- 2014: Stay Tuned (Baskaru Records)
