= 2008 in Norwegian music =

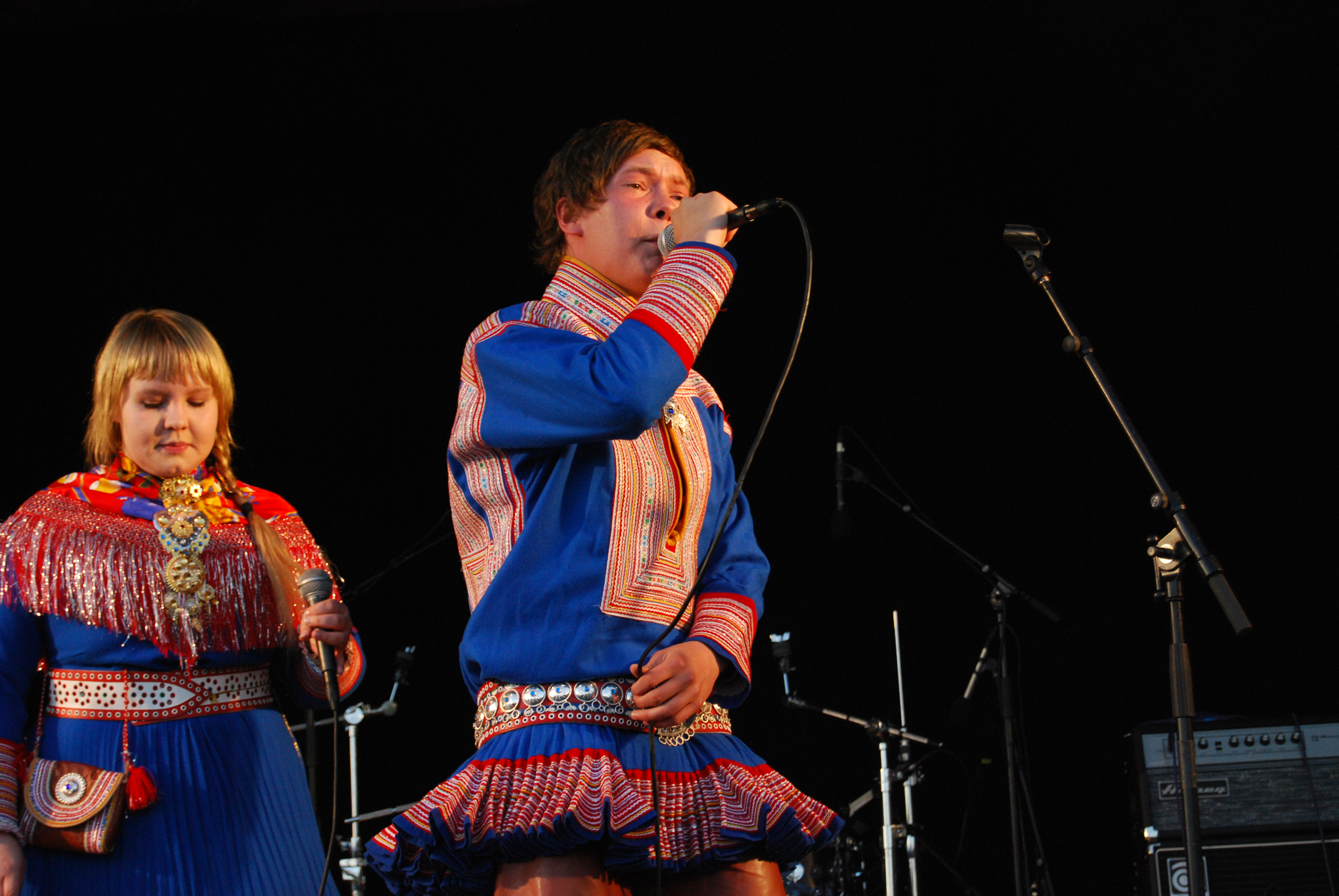
Duolva Duottar at the 2008 Márkomeannu

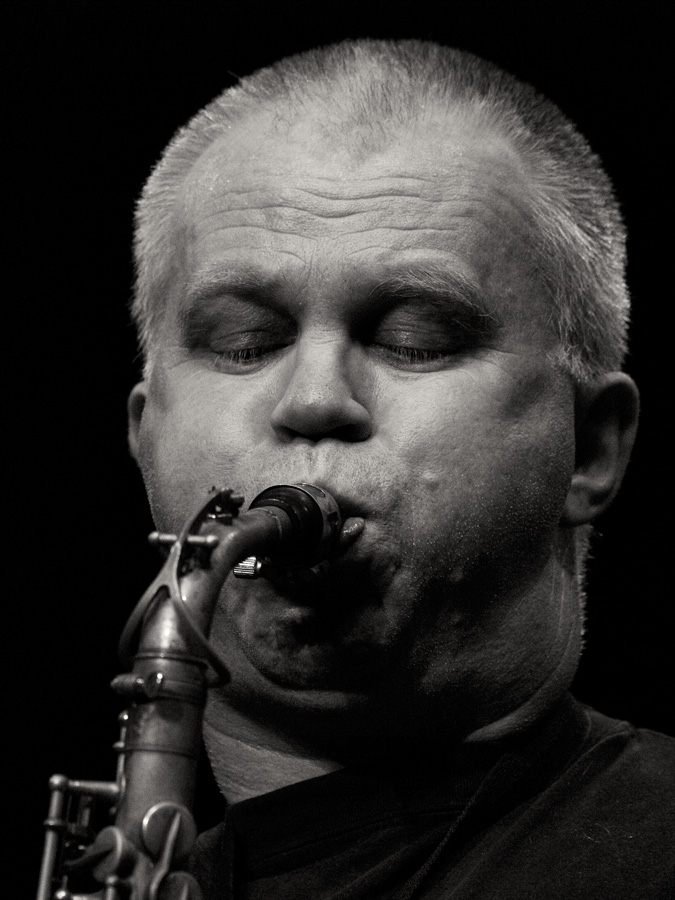
Frode Gjerstad at the Moers Festival

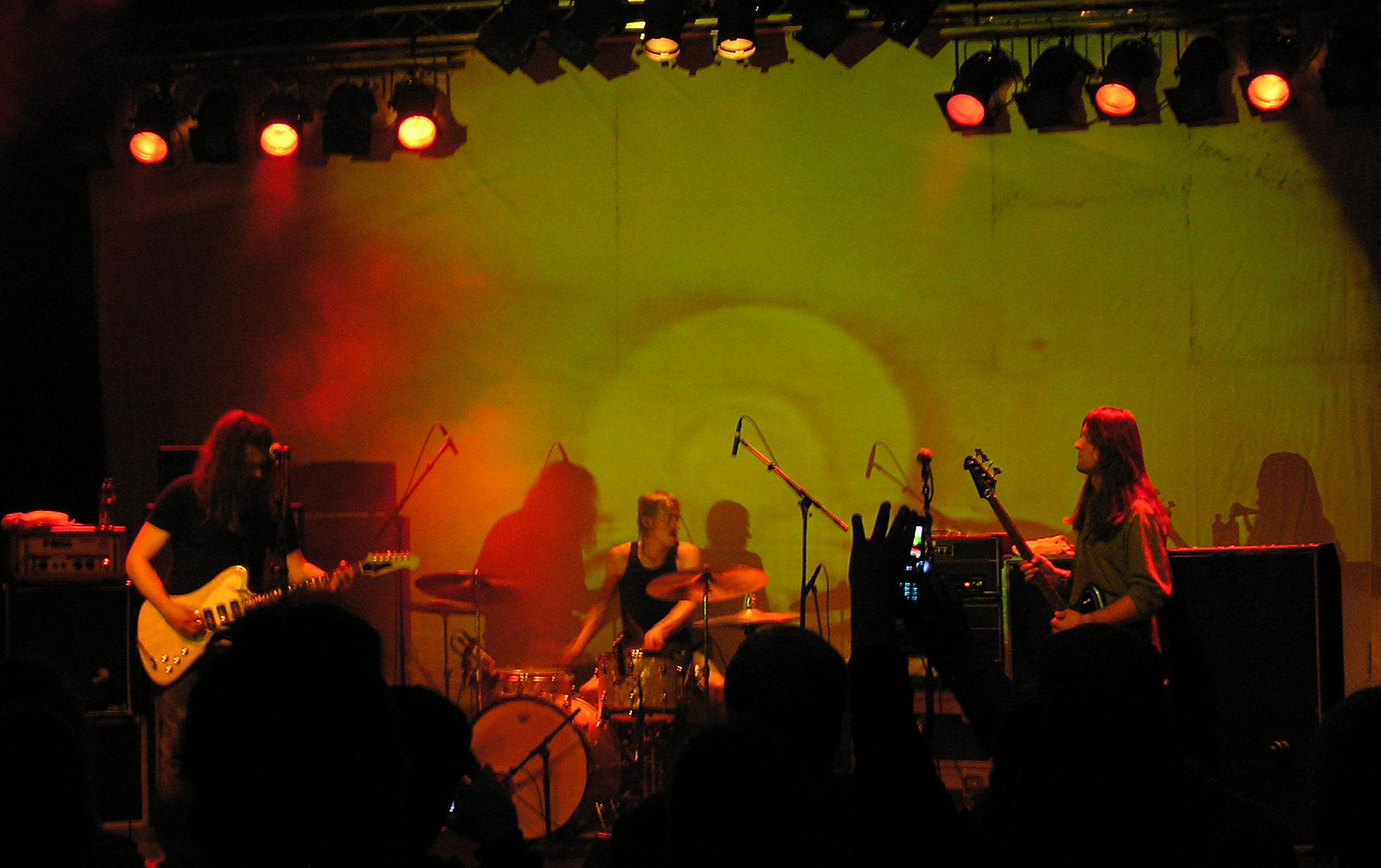
Motorpsycho 2008 in Steinkjer

The following is a list of notable events and releases of the year 2008 in Norwegian music.

== Events ==
=== January ===
- 25 – Nordlysfestivalen started in Tromsø (January 25 – February 2).
- 30 – The Polarjazz Festival 2008 started in Longyearbyen (January 30 – February 2).

=== February ===
- 5 – Kristiansund Opera Festival opened (February 7 – 23).

=== March ===
- 18
  - Vossajazz started in Voss Municipality (March 14–16).
  - Mads Berven was awarded Vossajazzprisen 2008.
- 19 – Tord Gustavsen performs the commissioned work Restar av lukke – bitar av tru for Vossajazz 2008.

=== April ===
- 29 – Bergenfest 2008 started in Bergen (April 29 – May 3).

=== May ===
- 21
  - The start of Bergen International Music Festival Festspillene i Bergen 2008 (May 21 – June 4).
  - Nattjazz 2008 started in Bergen (May 21 – 31).

=== June ===
- 12 – Norwegian Wood 2008 started in Oslo, Norway (June 12 – 15).

=== July ===
- 14 – Moldejazz started in Molde (July 14 – 19).
- 31 – The 21st Notodden Blues Festival started in Notodden (July 31 – August 3).

=== August ===
- 6 – Sildajazz started in Haugesund (August 6 – 10).
- 11 – Oslo Jazzfestival started (August 11 – 16).

=== September ===
- 4 – The 4th Punktfestivalen started in Kristiansand (September 4 – 6).
- 5 – The 5th Ekkofestival started in Bergen (September 5 – 6).
- 16 – The DølaJazz started in Lillehammer (September 16 – 19).

=== October ===
- 1 – The 30th Ultima Oslo Contemporary Music Festival opened in Oslo (Oktober 1–19).
- 9 – The 7th Insomnia Festival started in Tromsø (October 9 – 11).
- 30 – The 3rd Barents Jazz, Tromsø International Jazz Festival started (October 30 – November 1).

=== November ===
- 4 – The Oslo World Music Festival started in Oslo (November 4 – 9).

=== December ===
- 11 – The Nobel Peace Prize Concert was held at Telenor Arena.

== Albums released ==
=== April ===
Day	Album	Artist	Label	Notes	Ref.
15	Life in Leipzig	Ketil Bjørnstad	ECM Records	Produced by Manfred Eicher	

=== September ===
Day	Album	Artist	Label	Notes	Ref.
8	Suite for the Seven Mountains	Marius Neset's People Are Machines	Edition Records	Produced by Marius Neset & Anton Eger	

=== October ===
Day	Album	Artist	Label	Notes	Ref.
13	Norwegian Song 2	Dag Arnesen Trio	Resonant Music		
20	Flower of Evil	Susanna	Rune Grammofon	Produced by Deathprod and Susanna K. Wallumrød	

=== Unknown date ===
A

== Deaths ==
March

- 15 – Fredrik Friis, composer, singer, and lyricist (born 1923).
- 19 – Eivind Solberg, Norwegian trumpeter (born 1933).

April

- 29 – Julie Ege, singer, actress, and model (born 1943).

June

- 19 – Antonio Bibalo, Italian-born pianist and composer (born 1922).

July

- 3 – Harald Heide-Steen Jr., (lung cancer), Norwegian actor, comedian and jazz singer (born 1939).
- 14 – Henki Kolstad, singer and actor (born 1915).

== See also ==
- 2008 in Norway
- Music of Norway
- Norway in the Eurovision Song Contest 2008
