= 1939 in Norwegian music =

The following is a list of notable events and releases of the year 1939 in Norwegian music.

== Deaths ==
February

- 11 – Gustav Fredrik Lange, violinist, composer and music teacher (born 1861).

== Births ==
May

- 13 – Kari Løvaas, operatic soprano.
- 21 – Petter Pettersson, writer and cultural worker (Moldejazz).

July

- 19 – Ketil Hvoslef, composer.

August

- 9
  - Odd Børre, pop singer (died 2023).
  - Ove Stokstad, printmaker, jazz clarinetist and saxophonist (died 2018).
- 18 – Harald Heide-Steen Jr., actor, comedian and jazz singer (died 2008).
- 27 – Bjarne Fiskum, violinist, conductor and composer (died 2021).

October

- 18 – Jan Erik Vold, poet, jazz vocal reciter, singer, translator, and author.
- 30 – Kari Diesen Jr., entertainer (died 2016).

== See also ==
- 1939 in Norway
- Music of Norway
