= Wild Dog (album) =

Studio album by Susanna
- Released: March 16, 2012
- Genre: Pop, jazz
- Length: 34:59
- Label: SusannaSonata; Rune Grammofon (Norway)
- Producer: Deathprod & Susanna

Susanna chronology
3 (2009)	Wild Dog (2012)	The Forester (2013)

Wild Dog (released March 16, 2012 in Oslo, Norway) is the seventh album by Susanna, also known as Susanna and the Magical Orchestra, released on the label SusannaSonata (SONATALP004) / Rune Grammofon (RCD 2128).

== Background ==
The seventh album release by Susanna is a series of original songs, and here she prove herself as an original songwriter with a strong signature. Chicago Reader critique Peter Margasak, in his review Wild Dog states:

... I never thought about the influence Joni Mitchell might have had on Wallumrød, but I think it's undeniable here. Though their voices aren't particularly similar, their tunes share an elegant elasticity that stretches folk-pop into the world of jazz without getting lost in empty virtuosity. Wild Dog sounds introspective, but much of it has a churning restlessness that's rare on Wallumrød's much more austere earlier records. Most of the songs deal with heartbreak, loneliness, and longing—familiar topics—but her lyrics add an otherworldly mystery, particularly when she turns to nature...

Professional ratings
Review scores
Source	Rating
Allmusic	4/5 stars
The Guardian	4/5 stars
NRK Lydverket	5/6 stars

== Critical reception ==
The AllMusic reviewer Heather Phares awarded the album 4 stars, The Guardian reviewer John Fordham awarded the album 4 stars, and the reviewer Kim Klev of NRK Lydverket awarded the album dice 5.

== Track listing ==
(All music and lyrics by Susanna)

No.	Title	Length
1.	"Imagine"	4:00
2.	"Freeze"	2:59
3.	"Rolling on Rolling Stone"	3:34
4.	"Oh, I Am Stuck"	3:33
5.	"Starving Soul"	3:50
6.	"Invitation"	2:56
7.	"Wild Horse Wild Dog"	4:03
8.	"There Is Nothing Funny About This"	2:19
9.	"Her Eyes"	4:51
10.	"Lonely Heart"	2:54

== Musicians ==
- Susanna Wallumrød – Vocals
- Emmett Kelly – Guitars & Vocals
- Shahzad Ismaily – Bass Guitar
- Jeremy Gara – Drums

Additional musicians

  - Jo Berger Myhre – Double Bass (track 3), Bass Guitar (track 7)
  - Helge Sten – Performer 'Space And Beyond' (track 3)
  - Kari Rønnekleiv – Violin (track 6)
  - Ole Henrik Moe – Violin, Viola & Musical Saw (track 6)

== Credits ==
- Produced by Deathprod & Susanna
- Mixed & mastered by Helge Sten
- Recorded by Janne Hansson at Atlantis Studios
- Recorded by Eyvinn Magnus Solberg, Helge Sten & Henning Svoren at Ocean Sound Recordings
- Recorded by Helge Sten & Susanna K Wallumrød at Virus Lab
- Sleeve by Kim Hiorthøy
