= Sonata Mix Dwarf Cosmos =

Studio album by Susanna
- Released: 08-20-2008
- Genres: Pop; jazz
- Length: 48:10
- Label: Rune Grammofon (Norway)

Susanna chronology
Melody Mountain (2006)	Sonata Mix Dwarf Cosmos (2008)	Flower of Evil (2008)

Sonata Mix Dwarf Cosmos (released August 20, 2007 in Oslo, Norway) is the third album by Susanna, also known as Susanna and the Magical Orchestra, released on the label Rune Grammofon (RCD 2066).

== Background ==
This is the first album release as Susanna. It is a collection of original songs composed by Susanna, David Wallumrød (track 4) and Øystein Greni (track 7). Joined by a number of the elite jazz and prog rock musician of Norway, including her husband record producer and guitarist Helge Sten, pianists Morten Qvenild and her brother Christian Wallumrød, bassplayer Ingebrigt Håker Flaten, and drummer Pål Hausken, with guitarists Øystein Greni and Ola Fløttum, thereminist Barbara Buchholz and harpist Giovanna Pessi guesting on one song each.

Professional ratings
Review scores
Source	Rating
Allmusic	4/5 stars
The Guardian	5/5 stars

== Critical reception ==
The AllMusic reviewer Ned Raggett awarded the album 4 stars, and The Guardian reviewer Jude Rogers awarded the album 5 stars.

== Track listing ==
(All original songs composed by Susanna, except track 4, collaborative work with David Wallumrød, & track 7, collaborative work with Øystein Greni)

1. "Intruder" (5:26)
2. "Born In The Desert" (3:39)
3. "Hangout" (5:36)
4. "People Living" (3:35)
5. "Stay" (4:59)
6. "For You" (3:24)
7. "Better Days" (3:21)
8. "Traveling" (5:04)
9. "Demon Dance" (3:29)
10. "Home Recording" (3:20)
11. "We Offer" (3:44)
12. "Lily" (2:34)

== Musicians ==
- Susanna Karolina Wallumrød - Vocals, Piano & Guitar
- Morten Qvenild - Celesta (track 3), Grand Piano, Synthesizer (Memorymoog) (track 12)
- Ingebrigt Håker Flaten - Double Bass (track 9)
- Christian Wallumrød - Grand Piano (tracks 1 & 8)
- Helge Sten - Bowed and Slide Guitars (tracks 1, 5 & 7)
- Pål Hausken - Drums (track 11)
- Ola Fløttum - Main Guitar (track 5)
- Øystein Greni - Main Guitar (track 7)
- Giovanna Pessi - Historical Harp (track 3)
- Barbara Buchholz - Theremin (track 1)

== Credits ==
- Composed by Susanna K. Wallumrød (tracks 1–3, 5–6 & 8–12) & Mellotron (track 7)
- Mastered by Bob Katz
- Mixed by Helge Sten
- Music by – David Wallumrød (track 4), Susanna K. Wallumrød (tracks 4 & 7), Øystein Greni (track 7)
- Producer – Deathprod (Helge Sten)
- Recorded by – Helge Sten
- Harp Recorded by Helge Sten
- Theremin Recorded by Barbara Buchholz
- Sleeve artwork by Kim Hiorthøy

== Notes ==
- Phonographic Copyright (p) Rune Grammofon
- Copyright (c) Rune Grammofon
- Mixed at Audio Virus Lab
- Mastered at Digital Domain

== Tribute ==
In 2017, American singer Bonnie 'Prince' Billy released the album "Wolf in the Cosmos" that covered Susanna's album in its entirety.
