= Jo Berger Myhre =

Norwegian upright bassist

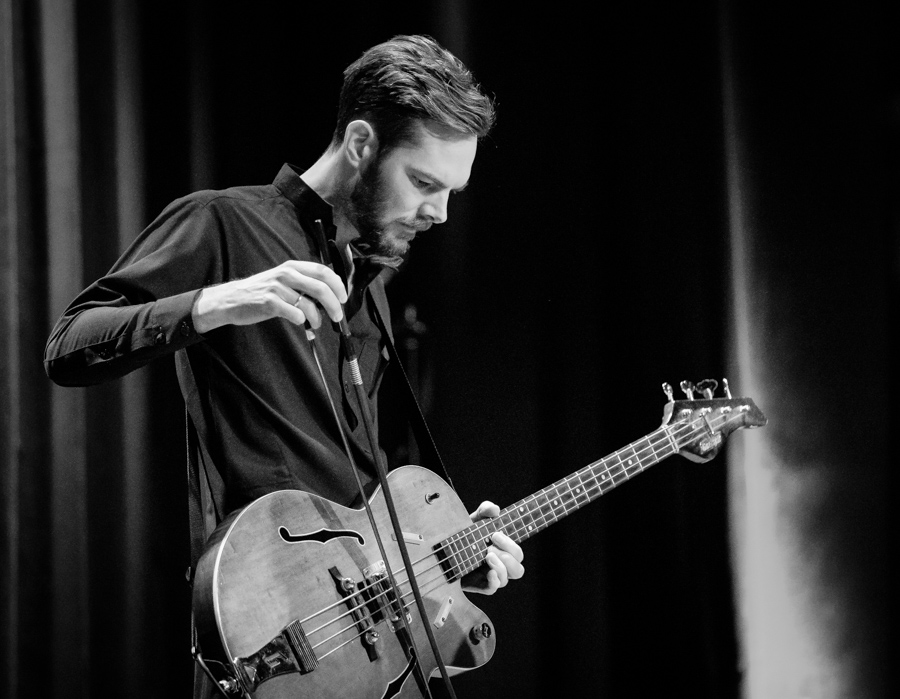
- Jo Berger Myhre performing at Kongshaugfestivalen in 2019

Background information
- Born: 29 May 1984 (age 42); Sandefjord, Vestfold
- Origin: Norway
- Genres: Jazz
- Occupations: Musician, composer
- Instrument: Upright bass
- Labels: Hubro Music; Rune Grammofon
- Website: www.groove.no/artist/71556828/jo-berger-myhre

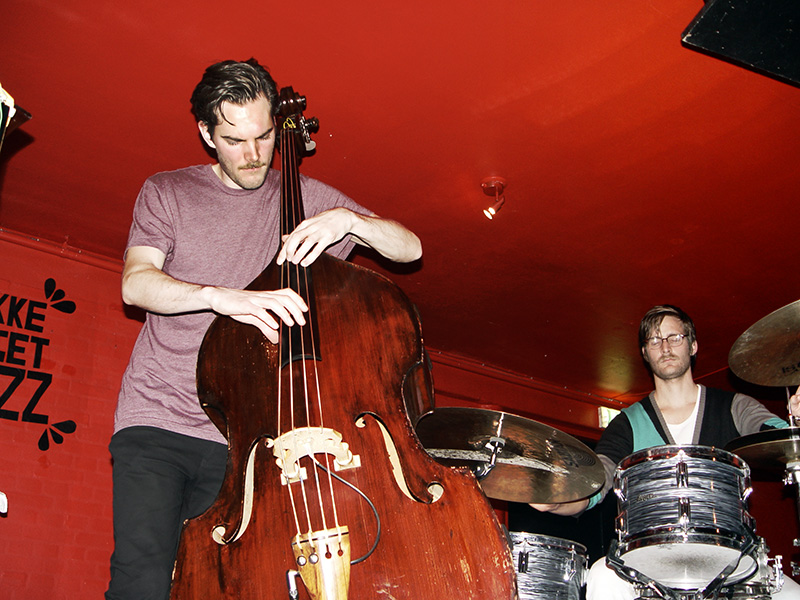
Jo Berger Myhre and Andreas Lønmo Knudsrød (2009) in Aarhus, Denmark

Jo Berger Myhre (born 29 May 1984 in Sandefjord, Norway) is a Norwegian musician who plays upright bass and bass guitars, known from performing with the likes of Splashgirl, Blokk 5, Ingrid Olava, Solveig Slettahjell Slow Motion Quintet and Finland: Grydeland/Qvenild/Hausken/Myhre. As a member of the Nils Petter Molvær Quartet (since 2013) he has contributed to two albums, Switch (2014) and Buoyancy (2016), to the last even as a co-producer.

== Career ==
Living in Oslo, Myhre holds a Bachelor degree in performing improvisational music from the Norwegian Academy of Music. In addition he attended one year studies under Anders Jormin at the Music Academy in Gothenburg, Sweden. He has a series of his own ongoing projects, but most active is with Splashgirl, a trio including with Andreas Stensland Løwe (piano and keyboards) and Andreas Lønso Knudsrød (drums and percussion) Their latest albums Huntsville (2011) and Field Day Rituals (2013).

== Discography ==
Blokk 5

- 2005: Casio Killed the Cornette (Blokk 5)

Splashgirl

- 2007: Doors. Keys (AIM Records)
- 2009: Arbor (Hubro Music)
- 2011: Pressure (Hubro Music)
- 2013: Field Day Rituals (Hubro Music)

Solveig Slettahjell

- 2011: Domestic Songs (Curling Legs)

Ingrid Olava

- 2008: Only Just Begun (EMI Music)
- 2008: Juliet's Wishes (Virgin Records)
- 2009: Tarpan Seasons (EmArcy, Universal Music, Norway), with Slow Motion Orchestra
- 2010: The Guest (Universal Music, Norway)

Torgeir Vassvik

- 2008: Sápmi (Idut)

Lasse Passage

- 2009: If You Don't Have Time To Cook, You Don't Have Time To Live (LP Records)

Jessica Sligter / Jæ

- 2010: Balls And Kittens, Draught And Strangling Rain (Hubro Music)
- 2012: Fear and the Framing (Hubro Music)

Susanna Wallumrød

- 2011: Jeg Vil Hjem Til Menneskene (Grappa Music)
- 2012: Wild Dog (Rune Grammofon)

Randi Tytingvåg

- 2013: Grounding (Ozella)

Finland including with Morten Qvenild, Ivar Grydeland, Pål Hausken

- 2015: Rainy Omen (Hubro Music)

With Nils Petter Molvær, Erland Dahlen, Geir Sundstøl

- 2014: Switch (OKeh Records)
- 2016: Buoyancy (OKeh Records)
