= Field Day Rituals =

Studio album by Splashgirl
- Released: February 1, 2011
- Recorded: Avast!, Seattle, WA, August 13–26, 2012
- Genre: Free Jazz
- Length: 46:37
- Label: Hubro Music
- Producer: Randall Dunn

Splashgirl chronology
Pressure (2011)	Field Day Rituals (2011)	Splashgirl / Huntsville (2013)

Field Day Rituals (released February 1, 2011 in Norway by the label Hubro Music – HUBRO CD 2520) is the fourth album of the Norwegian jazz band Splashgirl.

Professional ratings
Review scores
Source	Rating
All About Jazz	4.5/5 stars
Musicomh.com	4/5 stars
DMC World Magazine	5/5 stars

== Reception ==
The All About Jazz reviewer John Eyles awarded the album 4.5 stars, the reviewer Steven Johnson of Musicomh.com awarded the album 4 stars, and the reviewer Ben Hogwood of the British DMC World Magazine awarded the album 5 stars.

== Track listing ==
No.	Title	Length
1.	"Long Story" (Composed by Andreas Stensland Løwe)	3:48
2.	"Field Day Rituals" (Composed by Splashgirl)	6:23
3.	"All The Vowels Missing" (Composed by Andreas Stensland Løwe)	4:51
4.	"Dulcimer" (Composed by Andreas Stensland Løwe)	5:06
5.	"Mass" (Composed by Jo Berger Myhre)	6:12
6.	"Never Been Anywhere Before" (Composed by Andreas Stensland Løwe)	5:03
7.	"The Portal" (Composed by Jo Berger Myhre)	6:52
8.	"Twixt It And Silence" (Composed by Andreas Stensland Løwe)	3:30
9.	"I Feel Like I Know Her" (Composed by Andreas Stensland Løwe)	4:56

== Personnel ==
- Jo Berger Myhre – double bass
- Andreas Lønmo Knudsrød – drums, percussion
- Andreas Stensland Løwe – piano, keyboards
- Timothy Mason – modular synth
- Eyvind Kang – viola

== Credits ==
- Arranged by Splashgirl
- With arrangements by Randall Dunn
- Designed by Yokoland
- Mastered by Jason Ward
- Photography by Aslak Gurholt Rønsen
- Recorded, mixed and produced by Randall Dunn

== Notes ==
- Recorded, mixed and produced at Avast!, Seattle, WA, August 13–26, 2012
- Mastered by at Chicago Mastering Service
- Phonographic copyright (p) – Grappa Musikkforlag AS
- Copyright (c) – Grappa Musikkforlag AS
