= Splashgirl =

Norwegian jazz ensemble

- Origin: Oslo, Norway
- Genres: Jazz
- Years active: 2003–present
- Labels: Hubro Music
- Members: Andreas Stensland Løwe; Jo Berger Myhre; Andreas Lønmo Knudsrød
- Website: splashgirlband.squarespace.com

Splashgirl (initiated 2003 in Oslo, Norway) is a Norwegian jazz ensemble comprising the three young musicians Andreas Stensland Løwe (piano and electronics), Jo Berger Myhre (doublebass and tone generator) and Andreas Lønmo Knudsrød (drums, percussion and sounds), playing original music.

== Biography ==
Since 2007, Splashgirl has released four highly acclaimed albums Doors. Keys. (2007), Arbor (2009), Pressure (2011) and Field Day Rituals (2013), has played a great number of concerts in Europe, USA and Japan, and collaborated with musicians like Sidsel Endresen, Jan Bang, Eyvind Kang, Mari Kvien Brunvoll, Randall Dunn and Timothy Mason.

== Discography ==
- 2007: Doors. Keys. (AIM Records)
- 2009: Arbor (Hubro Music)
- 2011: Splashgirl / Huntsville (Hubro Music)
- 2011: Pressure (Hubro Music)
- 2013: Field Day Rituals (Hubro Music)
- 2016: Hibernation (Hubro Music)
- 2018: Sixth Sense (Hubro Music)
