= Andreas Lønmo Knudsrød =

Norwegian drummer (born 1982)

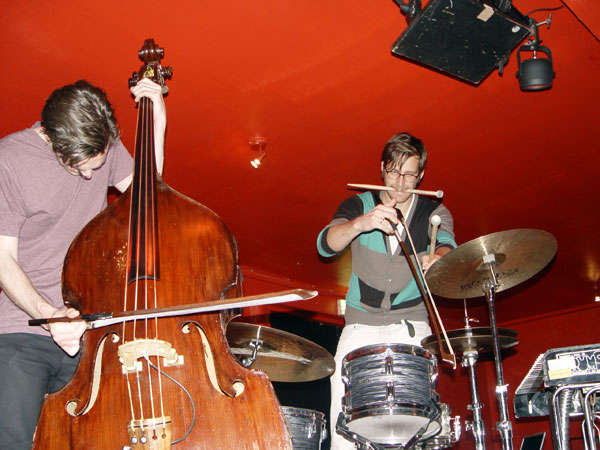
- Andreas Lønmo Knudsrød (d) and jo Berger Myre (b) in Aarhus, Denmark (2009)

Background information
- Born: 1 January 1982 (age 44); Revetal, Vestfold
- Origin: Norway
- Genres: Jazz
- Occupations: Musician, composer
- Instrument: Drums
- Labels: Hubro Music
- Website: www.splashgirl.com

Andreas Lønmo Knudsrød (born 1 January 1982 in Revetal, Norway) is a Norwegian drummer living in Oslo.

== Biography ==
Knudsrød is University Lecturer at the Norwegian Academy of Music in Oslo, department of Music Education and Music Therapy and playing with Blokk 5, Philco Fiction, Sacred Harp and Lama.

== Discography ==
With Splashgirl

- 2007: Doors. Keys. (AIM Records)
- 2009: Arbor (Hubro Music)
- 2011: Splashgirl / Huntsville (Hubro Music)
- 2011: Pressure (Hubro Music)
- 2013: Field Day Rituals (Hubro Music)

With Jæ

- 2010: Balls And Kittens, Draught And Strangling Rain (Hubro Music)
