= Jan Martin Smørdal =

Norwegian composer (born 1978)

Jan Martin Smørdal (born 14 October 1978 in Horten) is a Norwegian composer, arranger, producer and guitarist.

Smørdal holds a master's degree in Jazz Performance, and composition from the Norwegian Academy of Music and has studied with Henrik Hellstenius and Lasse Thoresen.

As a guitarist, Smørdal has contributed to a number of releases, both in band as well as solo settings, and has been a member of the live bands of Hanne Hukkelberg, Navyelectre and Rockettothesky (Jenny Hval). As a producer, Smørdal has worked with such performers and composers as Torgeir Vassvik, Rockettothesky, Nils Henrik Asheim and Siri Nilsen. Smørdal has contributed to a number of releases that have been bestowed with a Spellemannprisen Award.

As a co-founder of Ensemble neoN, Smørdal has collaborated with performers and composers such as Oren Ambarchi, Marina Rosenfeld and Susanna Wallumrød.

Smørdal has composed music for a variety of settings, ranging from solo to orchestra, installations and choir. His works have seen performances at the MATA Festival, the ISCM Festival in Vienna, the Ultima Oslo Contemporary Music Festival and Nordic Music Days.

== Production ==
=== Selected works ===
- Q.S. 1 (2003)
- Ichi - clarinet in Bb & bass clarinet (2005)
- manT.E.L. - clarinet in A, cello, tape (2006)
- less-sense - soprano, clarinet in A, percussion (2007)
- Me siglar ikkje same havet (2008)
- I am so - piano (2008)
- Play me - performer/perc. projections, tape (2008)
- Awe - voice, flute, clarinet, sax, soprano, guitar, piano, percussion, violin, cello (2009)
- snip-pets - guitar duo (2010)
- Fill in the blanks - percussion trio (2011)
- Vokse vilt - solo voice (alto), choir, accordion, organ, tuba, string quartet (2012)
- Oh, Danny boy – (2012)
- The Lesser Nighthawk - soprano, clarinet in Bb (2013/15)
- less-sense - revised and arranged for 6 musicians - soprano, flute, clarinet in Bb, piano, violin, cello (2014)
- All play - video, tape, flute, clarinet, piano, cello; revised version of "Oh, Danny boy" (2014)
- Bird on bike piece for young audience, flute, alto sax (2014)
- opp.hav, 16 ind. voices (2014)
- Choosing to sing - flute, clarinet, sax, piano, percussion, violin, cello (2015)
- (herd)Study - sinfonietta/15 musicians (2015)
- My Favorite Thing 2 - flute, clarinet, sax, soprano, guitar, percussion, piano, violin, cello (2015)
- Flock of me for recorded flutes, w/for Yumi Murakami (2015–16)
- SHO(r)TS (2015–16)
- flock foam fume, for Karin Hellqvist (violin) and 8 speakers (2016)
- "Madrigal", for soprano, guitar and flute (2018)
- "Diamond & dagger", for choir (2018)
- "still", for string orchestra (2019)
- "fivefingers", for pianotrio (2020)
