= Frå Senegal til Setesdal =

1997 world music studio album

Studio album by Kirsten Bråten Berg, Solo Cissokho, Kouame Sereba, Bjørgulv Straume
- Released: 1997
- Recorded: 1996, Oslo Lydstudio, Oslo, Norway
- Genre: World music
- Label: Grappa
- Producer: Hallvard Kvåle

Frå Senegal til Setesdal is a world music album made by a quartet consisting of Norwegian folk musicians Kirsten Bråten Berg and Bjørgulv Straume, Senegalese folk musician Solo Cissokho and Ivorian folk musician Kouame Sereba. It was released on Grappa in 1997.

Berg and Sereba performed the vocals. Berg and Straume played mouth harp, Cissokho kora and Sereba djembe and do-do.

== Production and release ==
The quartet was brought together by Rikskonsertene for an ad hoc promotional performance in 1995, and later booked to a festival at Cosmopolite by the same institution. The recording took place in 1996, produced by Hallvard Kvåle in Oslo Lydstudio.

The album was released by way of a mini tour of Norway, spanning Tromsø, Bodø, Trondheim, Lillehammer, Sandefjord, and Arendal. NRK made a music video for "Håvar Heddi/Goe".

== Reception ==
The album received several good reviews. Bladet Tromsø gave a dice throw of 6, the highest score, for the highly effective mixture of different folk traditions. The music was "almost ingenious in its simplicity". Competing Tromsø newspaper Nordlys was positive as well. Hordaland praised the "unmitigated beauty" of the music. Agderposten, issuing a dice throw of 5, wrote that the music probably took time to digest, but that the listener would find "very beautiful music for ear and soul". It was also highly "visual", aiding the mental imagery of the listener. The juxtaposition of styles was original and authentic, and the music was danceable, but some of the songs were too stretched, nearing the 10-minute mark. Aftenposten found the song length necessary, since the purpose probably was to catch the improvisation that took place in the studio.

A number of outlets issued a dice throw of 4 (of 6). Bergensavisen only found the record worthy of the dice throw 3, stating that the album became uniform and only would catch the interest of the "particularly inclined". Dag og Tid found that the project would have been more "original and exciting" in the 1980s. Nationen found that although the album veered on the verge of uniformity, and was "maybe somewhat polished around the edges", the reviewer deemed the project successful.

== Track listing ==
1. "Tiramakan"/"Eg vippa meg" – 3:44
2. "Håvår Heddi"/"Goe" – 5:40
3. "Bitilo" – 4:28
4. "Lill Lisa" – 3:42
5. "Atolago" – 2:08
6. "Horpa"/"Kono" – 9:33
7. "Jegerleik" – 4:09
8. "Sordølen"/"Kody Nadioulo" – 7:15
9. "Uppstaden" – 3:16
10. "Kouami Ba" – 3:02
11. "Bånsullar"/"Ding Ding Ide" – 2:59
12. "Halling Jorond" – 2:21
13. "Tveitåen"/"Djatto" – 4:21
