= Radka Toneff Memorial Award =

Radka Toneff Memorial Award (established in 1993) is a Norwegian award given to individuals who are acting in the spirit of Norwegian jazz singer Radka Toneff.

The award amounts to 25,000 Norwegian kroner and is managed by the Radka Toneff Memorial Fund with royalty income from her two releases Fairytales (1982) and Live in Hamburg (1993) on the label Odin Records.

The ceremony took place at Moldejazz until 2007.

== Past recipients ==
- 1993 – Sidsel Endresen
- 1997 – Kirsten Bråten Berg
- 1999 – Karin Krog
- 2001 – Per Jørgensen
- 2003 – Live Maria Roggen
- 2005 – Solveig Slettahjell
- 2007 – Arve Henriksen
- 2009 – Elin Rosseland
- 2011 – Eldbjørg Raknes
- 2013 – Hanne Hukkelberg
- 2015 – Susanna Wallumrød
- 2017 – Kirsti Huke

== See also ==
- List of music awards
