= Kirsten Bråten Berg =

Norwegian singer and silversmith

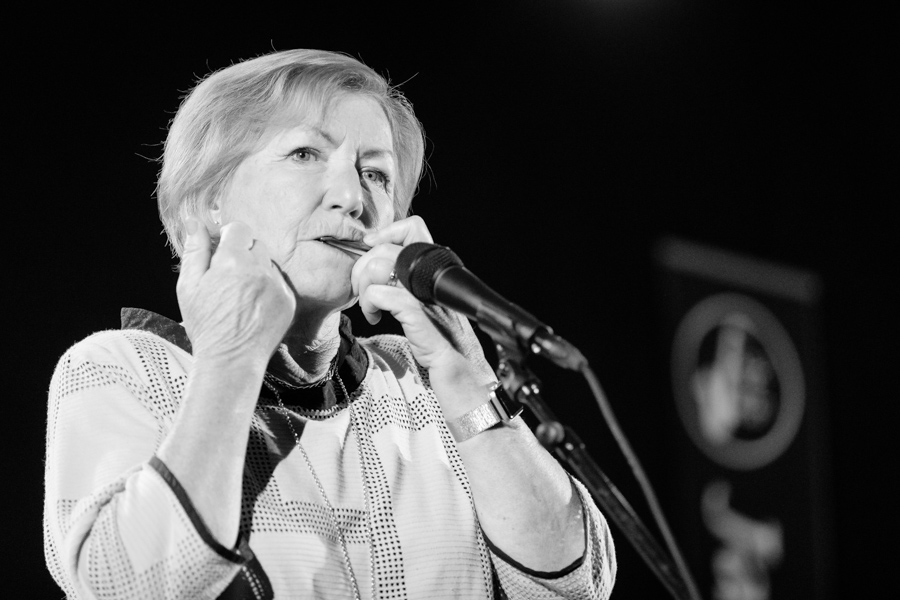
- Kirsten Bråten Berg performing in 2020

Background information
- Born: 1950; Arendal, Norway
- Genres: Folk
- Occupations: Musician, silversmith, government scholar
- Instrument: Singer
- Awards: Spellemannprisen for traditional music 1988 Min kvedarlund Gammlengprisen for vocal music 1991; Spellemannprisen for music for children 1993 Våre beste barnesanger 2 Radka Toneff Memorial Award; 1997; Knight First Class of The Royal Norwegian Order of St. Olav; 2005

Kirsten Marie Bråten Berg (born 7 January 1950 in Arendal, Norway) is a Norwegian traditional folk singer, silversmith, and government scholar. She is currently living in Valle Municipality in the Setesdal area of southern Norway. She trained as a silversmith at the Torleiv H. Bjørgums Vocational College (Oslo Yrkesskole an Torleiv H. Bjørgums) in Setesdal and then set up her own workshop there, in Nomeland.

== Career ==
She began singing traditional Norwegian folk songs in the 1970s and since the late 1970s has given concerts and made recordings, winning Spellemannprisen awards (the Norwegian equivalent of the Grammy award) in 1979 and 1988. She met the bass player Arild Andersen in 1990 and became a member of his group in 1992.

First verse of the Norwegian folksong Heiemo og Nykkjen ("Heiemo and the Water Sprite")
Kirsten Bråten Berg, accompanied by Ale Møller.

Bråten Berg's interest in the Norwegian folksong tradition has led her to meet and learn from older Norwegian musicians and people or from recordings of their music-making. Alongside figures such fiddler Hallvard Bjørgum, she exemplifies those Norwegian folk musicians trying to carry their tradition into modern times.

In 2005 she was made a Knight First Class of The Royal Norwegian Order of St. Olav in recognition of her work as a performer and ambassador of Norwegian culture.

She has also collaborated with West African musicians on the CD From Senegal to Setesdal.

== Honors ==
- 1988: Spellemannprisen in the class Traditional music, for the album Min kvedarlund
- 1991: Gammlengprisen in the class Vocal music
- 1993: Spellemannprisen in the class Music for children, for the album Våre beste barnesanger 2
- 1997: Radka Toneff Memorial Award
- 2005: Knight First Class of The Royal Norwegian Order of St. Olav

=== Memberships ===
She is foreign member of the Royal Swedish Academy of Music.

== Select discography ==
- 1979: Slinkombas
- 1980: Kirsten Bråten Berg
- 1982: Slinkombas og bas igjen
- 1984: SetesDalarna
- 1988: Min kvedarlund
- 1991: Joletid
- 1992: Sagn 1992
- 1993: Suede et Norvège
- 1993: Arv
- 1993: Våre beste barnesanger 2
- 1993: Cohen på norsk
- 1996: Pilgrimen
- 1997: Frå Senegal til Setesdal
  - 1997: From Senegal to Setesdal (Six Degrees Records, San Francisco)
- 1999: Smak av himmel, spor av jord
- 2000: Runarstreng
- 2001: Syng du mi røyst
- 2005: Stemmenes skygge (Heilo), with Marilyn Mazur and Lena Willemark
- 2007: Stev for dagen, with Astri Rysstad and Kari Rolfsen
- 2010: Songen
- 2012: Nordic Woman
- 2021: Kvitravn, with Wardruna

Preceded by Sidsel Endresen	Recipient of the Radka Toneff Memorial Award; 1997	Succeeded by Karin Krog
