= 3 (Susanna and the Magical Orchestra album) =

Studio album by Susanna
- Released: 24 August 2009
- Genre: Pop, jazz
- Length: 47:01
- Label: Rune Grammofon (Norway)
- Producer: Deathprod

Susanna chronology
Flower of Evil (2008)	3 (2009)	Wild Dog (2012)

3 is the sixth album by Susanna, and the third release in duo with Morten Qvenild as Susanna and the Magical Orchestra, released on the label Rune Grammofon (RCD 2090).

== Background ==
This is the third album release by the duo, with mostly original songs composed by the two of them individually. Joined on a few of the tracks by some of the elite jazz and prog rock musicians of Norway. All About Jazz critic John Kelman, in his review of Susanna's album 3 states:

... Relying on Wallumrød's pure, direct approach to singing and Qvenild's glorious attention to texture, 3 is another highlight in the careers of both Susanna and the Magical Orchestra the collective, and its two members individually. Stark, beautiful, tender and heartfelt, it's a singer/songwriter's album for the 21st century...

Professional ratings
Review scores
Source	Rating
Allmusic	4/5 stars
Tiny Mix Tapes	4/5 stars

== Reception ==
The AllMusic reviewer Heather Phares awarded the album 4 stars, and Tiny Mix Tapes reviewer Split Foster awarded the album 4 stars.

== Track listing ==
1. "Recall" (5:50)
2. "Guiding Star" (4:39)
3. "Game" (5:26)
4. "Palpatine's Dream" (5:01)
5. "Another Day" (3:56)
6. "Deer Eyed Lady" (3:45)
7. "Lost 4:43)
8. "Subdivisions" (4:52)
9. "Come On" (4:02)
10. "Someday" (4:47)

== Musicians ==
- Susanna Wallumrød - Vocals
- Morten Qvenild - Keyboards

Additional musicians

- Erland Dahlen - Drums & percussion (tracks 1 & 3)
- Andreas Mjøs - Vibraphone (track 3)
- Fredrik Wallumrød - Additional vocals (tracks 3 & 4)
- Mariam Wallentin - Additional vocals (tracks 4 & 6)
- Helge Sten - Guitar (track 6), keyboards (track 10)
- Morten Barrikmo Engebretsen - Bass clarinet (track 7)

== Credits ==
- Producer – Deathprod
- Co-producer – Susanna and the Magical Orchestra
- Design – Kim Hiorthøy
- Mastered By – Bob Katz
- Mixed by Helge Sten
- Programming & arrangements by Susanna and the Magical Orchestra
- Recorded by Helge Sten & Susanna And The Magical Orchestra
- Lyrics and compositions by Morten Qvenild (tracks: 3–4, 6, 9), Susanna K. Wallumrød (tracks: 1–2, 7, 10), Roy Harper (track 5)
- Composed by Alex Lifeson & Geddy Lee (track 8)
- Lyrics by Neil Peart (track 8)
