= Melody Mountain =

Studio album by Susanna and the Magical Orchestra
- Released: 2006
- Genre: Pop
- Label: Rune Grammofon (Norway)

Susanna and the Magical Orchestra chronology
List of Lights and Buoys (2004)	Melody Mountain (2006)	Sonata Mix Dwarf Cosmos (2007)

Professional ratings
Review scores
Source	Rating
Pitchfork Media	7.4/10
Being There Magazine	3.5/5 stars

Melody Mountain is Norwegian group Susanna and the Magical Orchestra's second album, released in 2006. It is a collection of low-key cover versions from a variety of artists.

== Track listing ==
(name of band covered listed to right of song)

1. "Hallelujah" (Leonard Cohen)
2. "It's a Long Way To The Top" (AC/DC)
3. "These Days" (Matt Burt)
4. "Condition Of The Heart" (Prince)
5. "Love Will Tear Us Apart" (Joy Division)
6. "Crazy Crazy Nights" (KISS)
7. "Don't Think Twice, It's All Right" (Bob Dylan)
8. "It's Raining Today" (Scott Walker)
9. "Enjoy the Silence" (Depeche Mode)
10. "Fotheringay" (Sandy Denny)

The most unknown contributor is Matt Burt; An American songwriter living in Trondheim, Norway. He has cooperated with the band Motorpsycho and also released a solo album where the song on this album is from.

Sandy Denny is the singer of Fairport Convention.

Love Will Tear Us Apart appeared in an episode of Grey's Anatomy.
