= Norwegian Society of Composers =

The Norwegian Society of Composers (Norwegian: Norsk Komponistforening) is a professional organization and labor union for composers in Norway, founded in 1917. It serves to protect the professional, economic, and social interests of Norwegian composers of contemporary music and to promote the creation and performance of new musical works.

== History ==
The society was established on 24 October 1917 in Kristiania (now Oslo) by a group of Norwegian composers, including Gerhard Schjelderup and Eyvind Alnæs. The primary impetus for its formation was the need for a unified voice to negotiate copyright protections and performance royalties, which were largely unregulated in Norway at the turn of the century.

During the interwar period, the society played a central role in the establishment of TONO in 1928, the Norwegian performing rights organization. This move allowed composers to receive systematic compensation for the public performance of their works, providing some stability for the profession.

In the post-World War II era, the society became a key participant in the development of the "Nordic Model" of cultural policy, advocating for state-funded grants and commissions to ensure a diverse national musical output.

== Purpose and Activities ==
The society operates as both a cultural organization and a trade union. Its core activities include advocacy for Norwegian composers to receive funding and copyright protection, administration of grants and awards, and the promotion of international cooperation among other similar agencies throughout Europe, such as the Nordic Composers' Council and the European Composer and Songwriter Alliance (ESCA).

== Membership ==
Membership is open to professional composers who have a significant body of work that demonstrates artistic merit. While historically focused on Western classical traditions, the society has expanded in recent decades to include composers working in electroacoustic music, sound art, and cross-disciplinary genres.

== Leadership ==
The society is governed by a board of directors elected by its members. Notable past chairs include Edvard Fliflet Bræin, Klaus Egge, and Arne Nordheim. As of 2024, the chair is Jørgen Karlstrøm.
