= List of Lights and Buoys =

Studio album by Susanna and the Magical Orchestra
- Released: 2004
- Genre: Pop/Indie
- Label: Rune Grammofon (Norway)

Susanna and the Magical Orchestra chronology
List of Lights and Buoys (2004)	Melody Mountain (2006)

Professional ratings
Review scores
Source	Rating
Pitchfork	(7.8/10)

Lists of Lights and Buoys is Norwegian group Susanna and the Magical Orchestra's debut, released in 2004. It is mostly known for the duo's interpretation of Dolly Parton's Jolene, but also contains several tracks written by the band.

== Track listing ==
No.	Title	Length
1.	"Who am I" (Dorothy Parker / Leonard Bernstein)	4:52
2.	"Jolene" (Dolly Parton)	3:53
3.	"Turn The Pages" (Morten Qvenild)	4:10
4.	"Friend" (Susanna Wallumrød)	3:30
5.	"Hello" (Susanna Wallumrød)	4:04
6.	"Believer" (Susanna Wallumrød)	3:26
7.	"Sweet Devil" (Susanna Wallumrød)	4:49
8.	"Baby" (Morten Qvenild & Sidsel Endresen)	4:23
9.	"Time" (Andreas Mjøs)	3:50
10.	"Distance Blues And Theory" (Dorothy Parker / Susanna Wallumrød)	5:42
11.	"Go" (Morten Qvenild)	1:55

== Personnel ==
- Susanna Karolina Wallumrød - vocals
- Morten Qvenild - keyboards, harmonium and autoharp
- Andreas Mjøs - vibraphone, guitar, timpani, programming and additional electronics

== Notes ==
- Written by Morten Qvenild (tracks #3, #8–9 & #11)
- Written by Susanna Karolina Wallumrød (tracks #4–7 & #10)
- Programming and additional electronics at rotoscope studio and sunshine sound productions
- Mixed & mastered by Helge Sten
- Produced by Deathprod
- Produced by Andreas Mjøs
- Recorded By – Audun Borrmann, Sjur Miljeteig
- Additional recording by Andreas Mjøs (track #11)
- Additional recording by Christian Snilsberg & Morten Qvenild
- Sleeve by Kim Hiorthoy
