= Flower of Evil (album) =

Studio album by Susanna
- Released: 20 October 2008
- Genre: Pop
- Label: Rune Grammofon (Norway)

Susanna chronology
Sonata Mix Dwarf Cosmos (2006)	Flower of Evil (2008)	3 (2009)

Professional ratings
Review scores
Source	Rating
Pitchfork Media	5.5/10
The Guardian	4/5

Flower of Evil (released 20 October 2008 in Oslo, Norway) is the fourth album by Susanna, also known as Susanna and the Magical Orchestra, released on the label Rune Grammofon. This is the second album release as Susanna, following the previous Sonata Mix Dwarf Cosmos (2007). It is a collection of low-key cover versions and also features two original songs. She is accompanied by her husband Helge Sten (Deathprod, Supersilent) and Pål Hausken (In The Country) and with Bonnie ”Prince" Billy guesting on two songs.

== Track listing ==
(cover versions have name of their original artist listed to right of song)

1. "Jailbreak" (Thin Lizzy)
2. "Can't Shake Loose" (Agnetha Fältskog)
3. "Who Knows Where the Time Goes?" (Sandy Denny)
4. "Vicious" (Lou Reed)
5. "Without You" (Harry Nilsson)
6. "Dance On" (Prince)
7. "Joy and Jubilee" (Bonnie 'Prince' Billy)
8. "Janitor of Lunacy" (Nico)
9. "Changes" (Black Sabbath)
10. "Wild Is the Will" (original)
11. "Don't Come Around Here No More" (Tom Petty and the Heartbreakers)
12. "Goodbye" (original)
13. "Forever" (Roy Harper)
14. "Lay All Your Love on Me" (ABBA)
