= The Forester (album) =

Studio album by Susanna & Ensemble neoN
- Released: 20 September 2013
- Recorded: Rainbow Studio; February 2012 Oslo, Norway
- Genre: Pop, Jazz
- Length: 33:41
- Label: SusannaSonata; Rune Grammofon (Norway)
- Producer: Deathprod, Susanna

Susanna & Ensemble neoN chronology
| Wild Dog (2012) | The Forester (2013) | Triangle (2016) |

The Forester (released September 20, 2013 in Oslo, Norway) is the eighth album by Susanna, also known as Susanna and the Magical Orchestra, this time as Susanna and Ensemble neoN, leased on the label SusannaSonata (SONATACD008).

== Background ==
The eighth album release by Susanna is a series of original songs, and here she prove herself as an original songwriter with a strong signature. All About Jazz critique John Kelman, in his review The Forester states:

... Instead, throughout The Forester, Susanna delivers words that examine, in a most profound and poetic fashion, the joys and pitfalls of the human condition, her voice combining strength and vulnerability, and employing vibrato sparingly, as a device rather than a crutch...

Professional ratings
Review scores
| Source | Rating |
|---|---|
| Allmusic | 4/5 stars |
| The Guardian | 4/5 stars |
| Gaffa.no | 5/6 stars |

== Reception ==
AllMusic awarded the album 4 stars, The Guardian reviewer John Fordham awarded the album 4 stars, and the reviewer Per Henrik Arnesen of Gaffa magazine awarded the album dice 5.

== Track listing ==
All music is composed by Susanna Wallumrød.

| No. | Title | Length |
|---|---|---|
| 1. | "The Forester I, II & III" | 15:38 |
| 2. | "Hangout" | 5:08 |
| 3. | "Oh, I Am Struck" | 4:19 |
| 4. | "Intruder" | 5:29 |
| 5. | "Lonely Heart" | 3:00 |

== Musicians ==
- Susanna Karolina Wallumrød - Vocals, Grand Piano
- Ida Kristine Zimmermann Olsen - Alto saxophone
- Inga Byrkjeland - Cello
- Kristine Tjøgersen - Clarinet & bass clarinet
- Yumi Murakami - Flute & alto flute
- Ane Marthe Sørlien Holen - Percussion
- Solmund Nystabakk - Theorbo
- Karin Hellqvist - Violin
- Magnus Loddgard - Conductor

== Credits ==
- Producerd by Deathprod & Susanna
- Recorded & mixed by Jan Erik Kongshaug
- Mixed with Helge Sten, Jan Martin Smørdal & Susanna
- Mastered by Helge Sten
- Sleeve by Kim Hiorthøy

== Notes ==
- Recorded at Rainbow Studio in February 2012 Oslo, Norway
- Mixed at Rainbow Studio
- Mastered at Audio Virus Lab
