= Morten Qvenild =

Norwegian jazz pianist and band leader (born 1978)

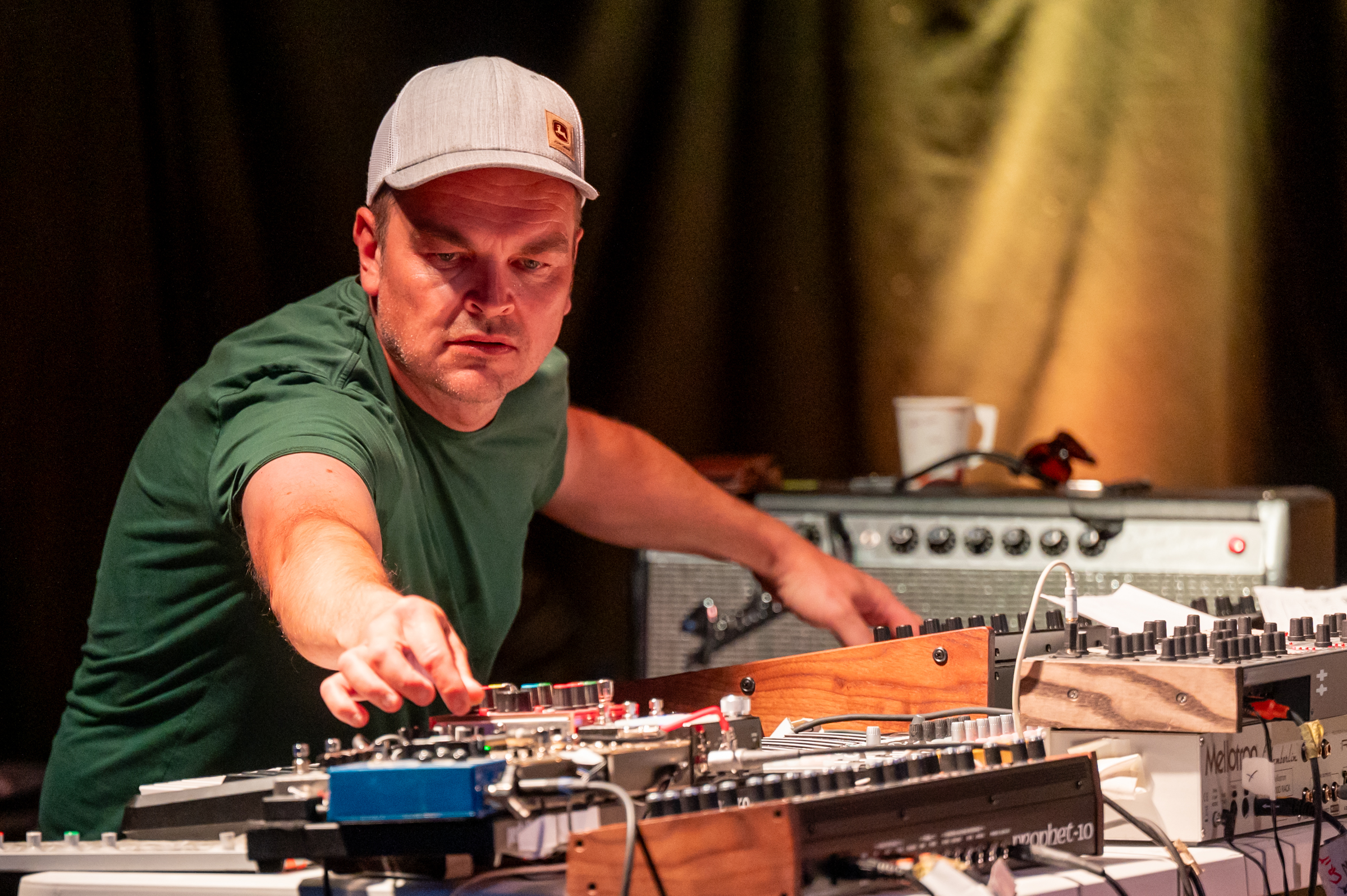
- Qvenild at Kongsberg Jazz Festival 2024

Background information
- Born: 31 August 1978 (age 48); Kongsberg, Norway
- Genres: Jazz
- Occupation: Musician
- Instruments: Piano; keyboards
- Labels: Rune Grammofon, ACT
- Member of: Susanna & the Magical Orchestra, Solveig Slettahjell
- Formerly of: Jaga Jazzist, Shining

Morten Qvenild (born 31 August 1978) is a Norwegian jazz pianist, band leader, and producer.

== Career ==
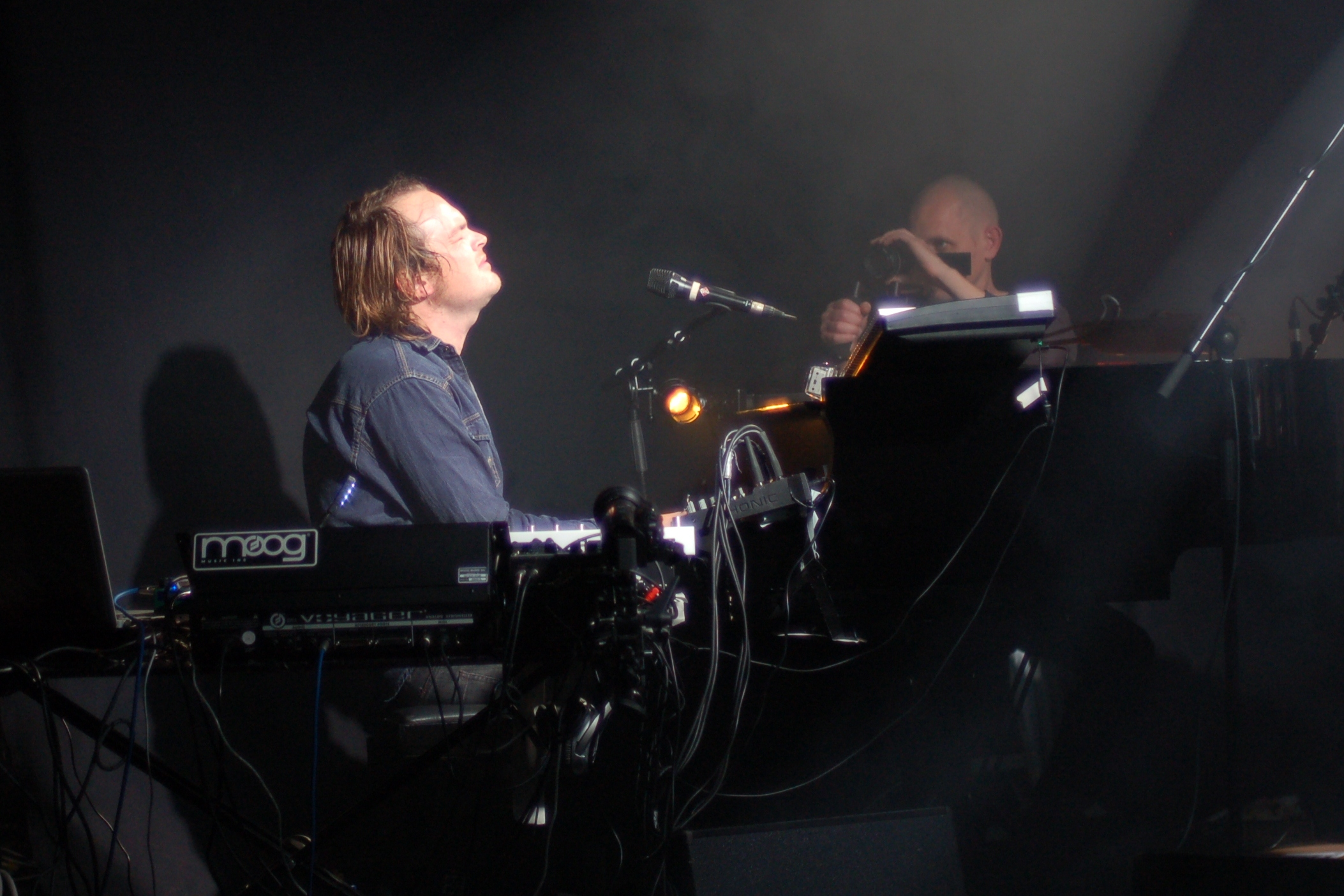
With In the Country, 2010

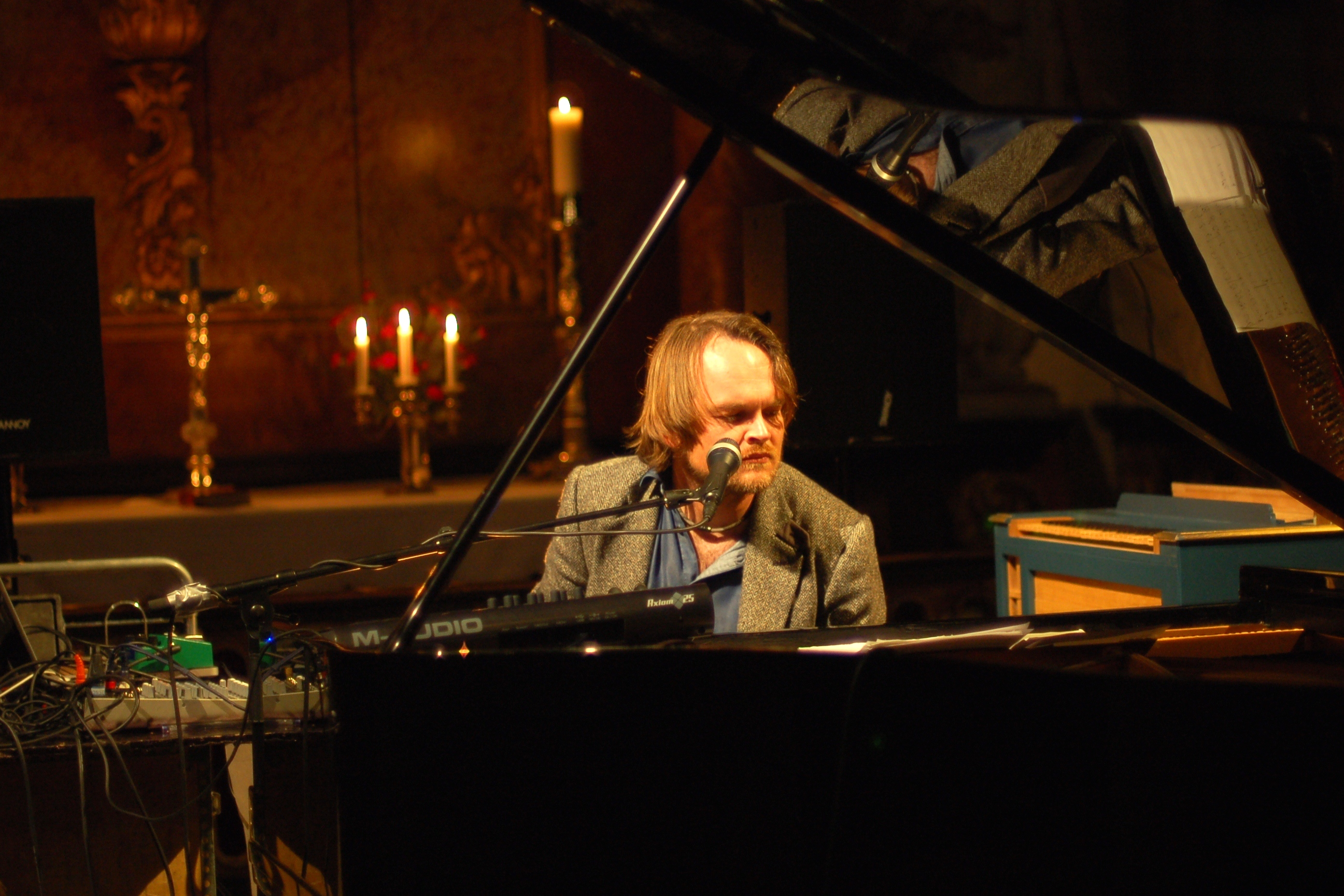
Solo concert, 2011

Qvenild started his jazz career in the big band Ung Musikk in 1995, followed by studies on the Jazz program at the Norges Musikkhøgskole. He used to play in Østenfor Sol with Ole Jørn Myklebust, with Myklebust's OJ Trio, Shining (1999–2003), and Jaga Jazzist (2000–2002).

Since 2000, Qvenild is the main instrumentalist of Susanna & the Magical Orchestra and an original member of Solveig Slettahjell's Slow Motion Quintet as well a duo partner. Beyond these collaborations Qvenild has also collaborated with the Jon Klette Quartet, The National Bank and he toured with Nils Petter Molvær's Khmer and with Bertine Zetlitz Band (2003 and 2004).

In 2003, Qvenild founded the trio In the Country with co-students Roger Arntzen (bass) and Pål Hausken (drums). They recorded five albums for Rune Grammofon. On the latter two –Whiteout (2009) and the live recorded Sounds and Sights (2011)– the band was joined by multi-instrumentalist Andreas Mjøs. Their last release was issued by the German ACT label.

In 2011, he performed with Marit Larsen a new version of Erik Bye's Vår beste dag. This has become NRK's tune in their profile campaign.

In 2017, he took part, playing multiple instruments such as upright piano, harpsichord, harmonium, dulcitone, mandolinette, autoharp and kokles on a-ha's MTV Unplugged recording of the Live Album, "Summer Solstice" in Giske, Norway and the Subsequent Unplugged tour in Jan and Feb 2018. He played keyboards for their Electric Summer tour in June through August 2018.

== Honors ==
- 2004: JazzIntro Award with the band In the Country at the Moldejazz
- 2004: Spellemannprisen in the class jazz with Solveig Slettahjell and pop music with The National Bank
- 2007: Kongsberg Jazz Award
- 2016: Edvardprisen in the open class for the album Personal Piano

== Discography ==
=== As leader ===
- 2015: Personal Piano
- 2016: The HyPer(Sonal) Piano Project - Towards A (Per)Sonal Topography Of Grand Piano And Electronics (Hubro Music)
- 2019: Landet Bortanfor Landet - Område 51 (Grappa Musikkforlag)

=== As sideman ===
With In the Country

- 2005: This Was the Pace of My Heartbeat (Rune Grammofon)
- 2006: Losing Stones, Collecting Bones (Rune Grammofon)
- 2009: Whiteout (Rune Grammofon)
- 2011: Sounds and Sights (Rune Grammofon)
- 2013: Sunset Sunrise (ACT)

With Susanna & the Magical Orchestra (Susanna Wallumrød)

- 2004: List of Lights and Buoys (Rune Grammofon)
- 2006: Melody Mountain (Rune Grammofon)
- 2009: 3 (Rune Grammofon)

Awards
Preceded by Håvard Wiik	Recipient of the Kongsberg Jazz Award; 2007	Succeeded by Helge Lien
Preceded by Tuva Syvertsen and Erik Sollid (Valkyrien Allstars)	Recipient of the open class Edvardprisen; 2016	Succeeded by Susanna Wallumrød
