= Susanna Wallumrød =

Norwegian vocalist (born 1979)

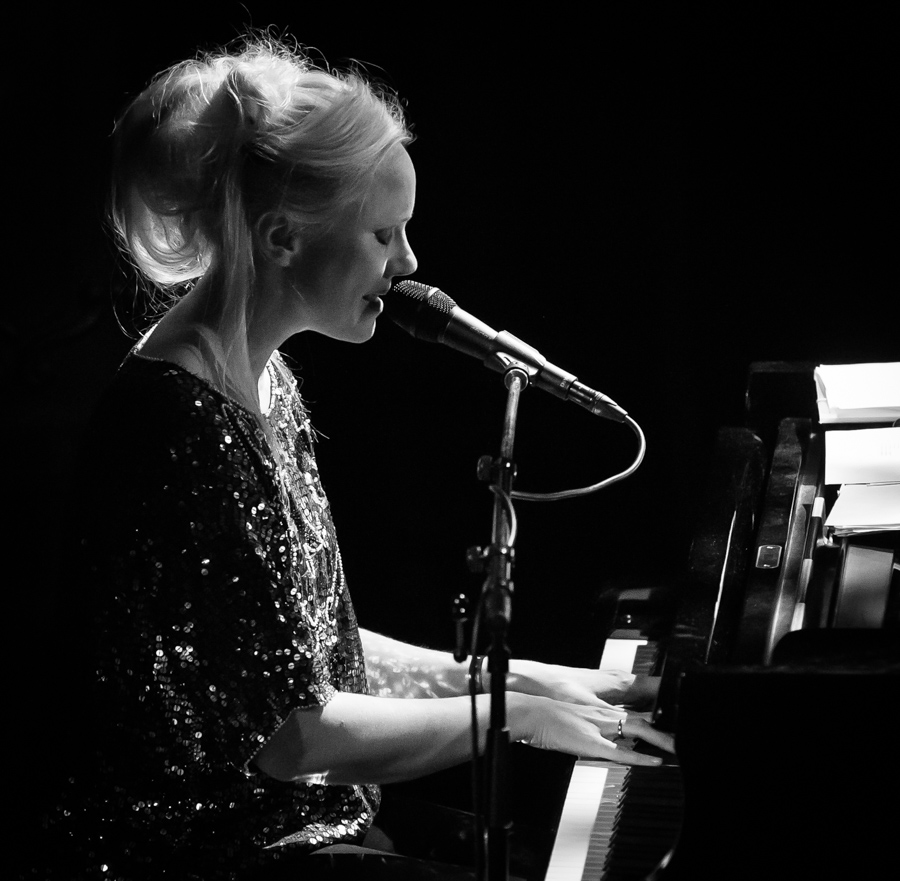
- Susanna Wallumrød at Oslo Jazzfestival 2016

Background information
- Born: Susanna Karolina Wallumrød; 23 June 1979 (age 47); Kongsberg, Buskerud
- Origin: Norway
- Genres: Indie pop, jazz
- Occupations: Musician, composer
- Instruments: Vocals, piano, guitar
- Labels: ECM Records; Rune Grammofon; Grappa Music; SusannaSonata
- Formerly of: Susanna and the Magical Orchestra
- Website: www.susannamagical.com

Susanna Karolina Wallumrød (born 23 June 1979) is a Norwegian vocalist, known for her low key original songs. She was born in Kongsberg, and is the sister of the drummer Fredrik Wallumrød and the pianist Christian Wallumrød; she is the cousin of the pianist David Wallumrød, and is married to the music producer Helge Sten.

== Career ==
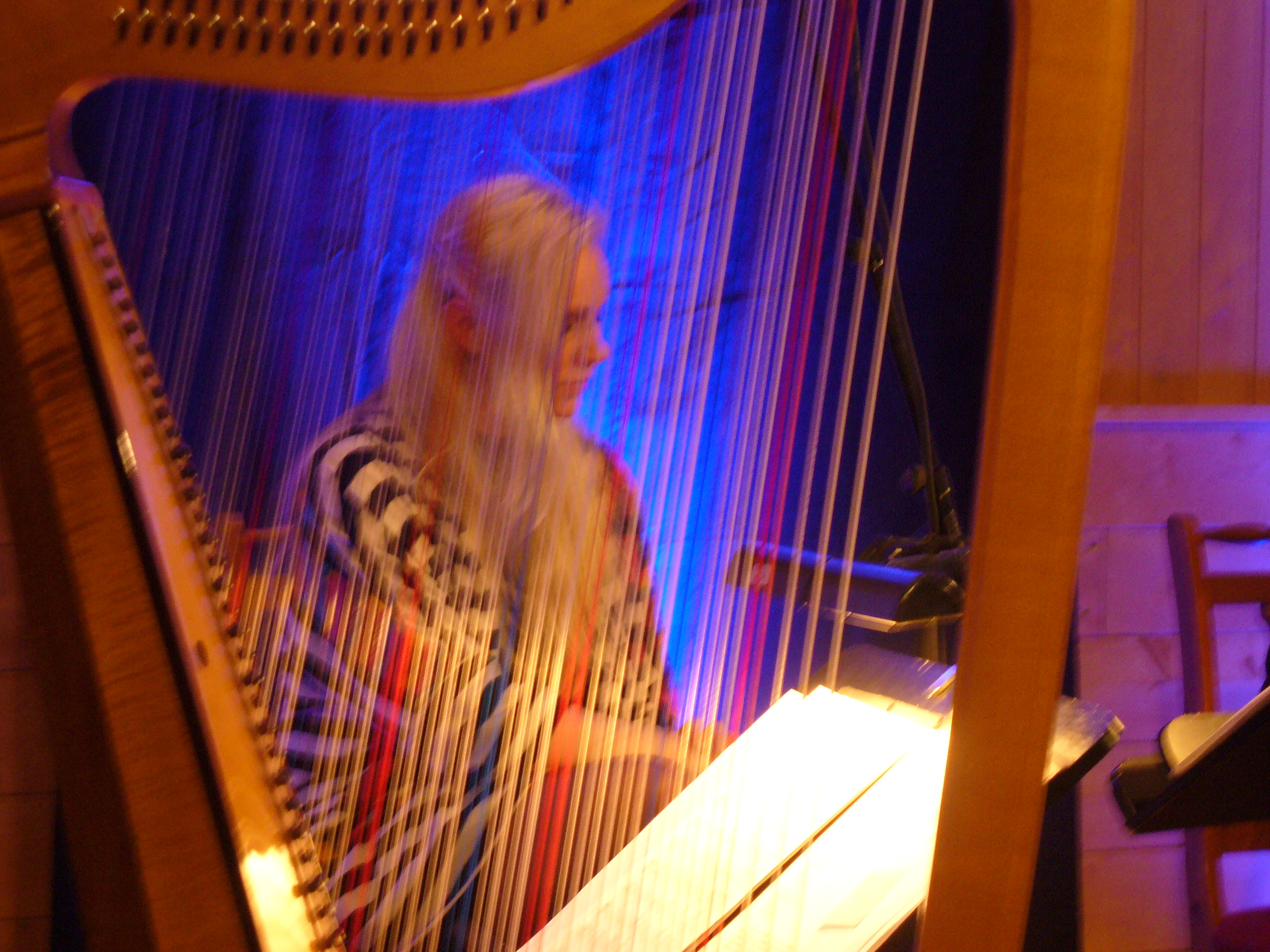
Susanna with Giovanna Pessi at Vossajazz 12 April 2014

Susanna and the Magical Orchestra is the moniker of singer Susanna and keyboard player Morten Qvenild. Her song "Believer" from their first album and their cover version of Joy Division's "Love Will Tear Us Apart" featured in two 3rd season episodes of the American medical drama Grey's Anatomy and on 3rd season of Skins, on episode 6.

The German rock band Fury in the Slaughterhouse uses Susanna's AC/DC-cover of "It's a Long Way to the Top If You Wanna Rock'n Roll" as intro and the Joy-Division-cover "Love Will Tear Us Apart" as Outro on their "Farewell & Goodbye Tour 2008".

Susanna Wallumrød has cooperated with baroque harpist Giovanna Pessi, who has previously made herself known with a variety of ECM recordings. Pessi's collaboration with pianist Christian Wallumrød brought her regularly to Oslo, where she met and became friends with Susanna, the pianist's sister. Susanna invited Pessi to play on her solo album Sonata Mix Dwarf Cosmos (2008), and four years later, the Norwegian vocalist's turn to take guest role.

On If Grief Could Wait she sings both her own songs and compositions by Henry Purcell, Leonard Cohen and Nick Drake. In the center of the album is Susannas clear voice and Pessis delicate harp. The ensemble also comprises Marco Ambrosini on nyckelharpa and Jan Achtman on viola da gamba.

A meeting between Tord Gustavsen's strong Norwegian Quartet and Susanna Wallumrød, brought vocalists to the premiere of a new musical project during the Oslo Jazz Festival 2012. The musical movements that Wallumrød sang were previously performed by singers from Trio Mediaeval and the Tord Gustavsen Trio.

Led Zeppelin's John Paul Jones joined Susanna and Deathprod at Øya-festialen 2013.

== Honors ==
- 2012: Gammleng-prisen in the Open class
- 2013: Spellemannprisen in the Open class
- 2015: Radka Toneff Memorial Award
- 2016: Kongsberg Jazz Award
- 2014: Spellemannprisen in the Open class
- 2016: Spellemannprisen in the Open class

== Discography ==
Magical Orchestra

- 2004: List of Lights and Buoys (Rune Grammofon)
- 2006: Melody Mountain (Rune Grammofon)
- 2009: 3 (Rune Grammofon)

Susanna

- 2007: Sonata Mix Dwarf Cosmos (Rune Grammofon)
- 2008: Flower of Evil (Rune Grammofon)
- 2012: Wild Dog (Rune Grammofon)
- 2013: The Forester (SusannaSonata)
- 2016: Triangle (SusannaSonata)
- 2018: Go Dig My Grave (SusannaSonata)
- 2021: LIVE – Susanna & David Wallumrød (SusannaSonata)
- 2022: Elevation Extended EP (SusannaSonata), Susanna featuring Stina Stjern & Delphine Dora
- 2023: Baudelaire & Orchestra (SusannaSonata)
- 2024: The Harmony of Evening EP (SusannaSonata)
- 2024: Meditations on Love (SusannaSonata)

Susanna Wallumrød

- 2011: Jeg Vil Hjem Til Menneskene (Grappa Music), Susanna Wallumrød sings Gunvor Hofmo

With Jenny Hval

- 2014: Meshes of Voice (SusannaSonata)

With the Brotherhood of Our Lady

- 2019: Garden of Earthly Delights (SusannaSonata)

Awards
Preceded by Sissel Kyrkjebø	Recipient of the Open class Gammleng-prisen; 2012	Succeeded by Hilde Marie Kjersem
Preceded by Farmers Market	Recipient of the Open class Spellemannprisen; 2013	Succeeded by Jenny Hval and Susanna
Preceded by Ellen Andrea Wang	Recipient of the Kongsberg Jazz Award; 2016	Succeeded by Marius Neset
Preceded by Hanne Hukkelberg	Recipient of the Radka Toneff Memorial Award; 2017	Succeeded by Kirsti Huke
Preceded by Morten Qvenild	Recipient of the open class Edvardprisen; 2017	Succeeded by -
