= Mads Berven =

Norwegian jazz guitarist

- Born: Mads Falck Berven; 23 May 1977 (age 48); Bergen, Hordaland
- Origin: Norway
- Genres: Jazz, rock, pop, electronica
- Occupations: Musician, composer
- Instrument: Guitar

Mads Falck Berven (born 23 May 1977 in Bergen, Norway) is a Norwegian jazz musician (guitar) and law graduate from University of Bergen, known from a series of albums and cooperations with the like of Øystein Moen, Eirik Hegdal, Magne Thormodsæter, Ole Marius Sandberg, Kåre Opheim, Gard Nilssen, Per Jørgensen, Olav Dale and Helén Eriksen.

== Career ==
Berven received lessons in piano and violin at a young age, and started playing classical guitar with Stein-Erik Olsen in 1992. He is educated on the Jazz programme at Trondheim Musikkonservatorium (2003–07), and has played with a wide variety of artists and has many band projects. He was among other things for a number of years regular guitarist in Ralph Myerz and the Jack Herren Band.

Berven play in bands like "Dawn", "Robaat", "Duoz" for "Derreck" with John Hegre, "No får det vere rock", with Ole Thomsen and Ola Høyer and "Kniv og Taffel SwingJazz Orkester". He debuted as a solo artist with the album Mountains & the Sea (2011), an album with Kåre Opheim (drums) and Anders Bitustøyl (bass).

== Honors ==
- Winner of "Kronstadfestivalen" within the Rock band "BLY" 1994
- This years Live Band within Kniv og Taffel" 2002
- Bergen Kommunes Etableringsstipend 2008
- Vossajazzprisen 2008

== Discography (in selection) ==
=== As band leader ===
- 2011: Mountains & the Sea (Komanche), within his M.B. Trio

=== Collaborative works ===
With Ralph Myerz and the Jack Herren Band

- 2004: Your New Best Friends (Emperor Norton)
- 2006: Sharp Knives And Loaded Guns (EMI Music (Norway)/Virgin)

With others

- 2002: Kevin Keegan (Bergen), with the band "Logikal"
- 2003: Superworldunknown (Waterfall, Norway), with Karin Park
- 2003: Hush Hush (EMI Music, Norway), with Nathalie Nordnes
- 2003: Tafler Julen Inn (PS!), with "Kniv og Taffel"

Awards
Preceded by Snorre Bjerck	Recipient of the Vossajazzprisen; 2008	Succeeded by Kjetil Møster
