= Crime Scene (Terje Rypdal album) =

Live album by Terje Rypdal
- Released: April 16, 2010
- Recorded: May 2009
- Venues: Nattjazz; Bergen, Norway
- Genre: Jazz
- Length: 68:05
- Labels: ECM; ECM 2041
- Producer: Erling Wicklund

Terje Rypdal chronology
Vossabrygg (2006)	Crime Scene (2010)	Odyssey In Studio & In Concert (2012)

Crime Scene is an album by guitarist Terje Rypdal recorded in May 2009 and released on ECM the following year.

== Reception ==
The AllMusic review awarded the album 4 stars.

Professional ratings
Review scores
Source	Rating
Allmusic	4/5 stars

== Track listing ==
All tracks are written by Terje Rypdal except as noted.

No.	Title	Writer(s)	Length
1.	"Clint - The Menace"		2:15
2.	"Prime Suspects"		6:55
3.	"Don Rypero"		5:31
4.	"Suspicious Behaviour"		2:55
5.	"The Good Cop"		3:44
6.	"Is That a Fact"		4:14
7.	"Parli con me?!"	Paolo Vinaccia	5:26
8.	"The Criminals"		3:02
9.	"Action"		2:17
10.	"One of Those"		2:59
11.	"It's Not Been Written Yet"		8:53
12.	"Investigation"		5:46
13.	"A Minor Incident"		2:18
14.	"Crime Solved"		3:03

== Personnel ==
- Terje Rypdal – electric guitar
- Palle Mikkelborg – trumpet
- Ståle Storløkken – Hammond B-3 organ
- Paolo Vinaccia – drums & sampling

=== Bergen Big Band ===
- Olav Dale – director, flute, piccolo flute, alto flute & bass clarinet
- Jan Kåre Hystad – alto flute, clarinet & bass clarinet
- Ole Jacob Hystad – tenor saxophone & clarinet
- Zoltan Vincze – tenor saxophone
- Michael Barnes – baritone saxophone & bass clarinet
- Martin Winter – lead trumpet & flugelhorn
- Svein Henrik Giske – trumpet & flugelhorn
- Are Ovesen – flugelhorn
- Reid Gilje – flugelhorn
- Øyvind Hage – lead trombone
- Sindre Dalhaug – trombone
- Pål Roseth – trombone
- Kjell Erik Husom – bass trombone
- Ole Thomsen – electric guitar
- Helge Lilletvedt – electric piano
- Magne Thormodsæter – double bass & electric bass
- Frank Jakobsen – drums & percussion

== Notes ==
- Recorded May 2009 at Nattjazz, Bergen
