= Ole Thomsen =

Norwegian jazz musician (born 1952)

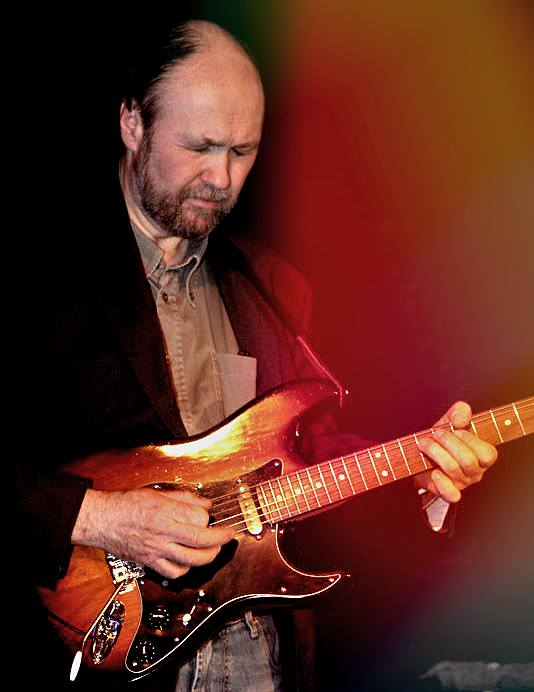

Background information
- Born: 28 November 1952 (age 73); Bergen, Hordaland
- Origin: Norway
- Genres: Jazz
- Occupations: Musician, composer
- Instrument: Guitar
- Website: www.olethomsen.com

Ole Thomsen (born 28 November 1952 in Bergen, Norway) is a Norwegian jazz guitarist and composer, known since 1977 as a central figure in the Bergen jazz scene. He is the older brother of guitarist Kåre Thomsen.

== Career ==
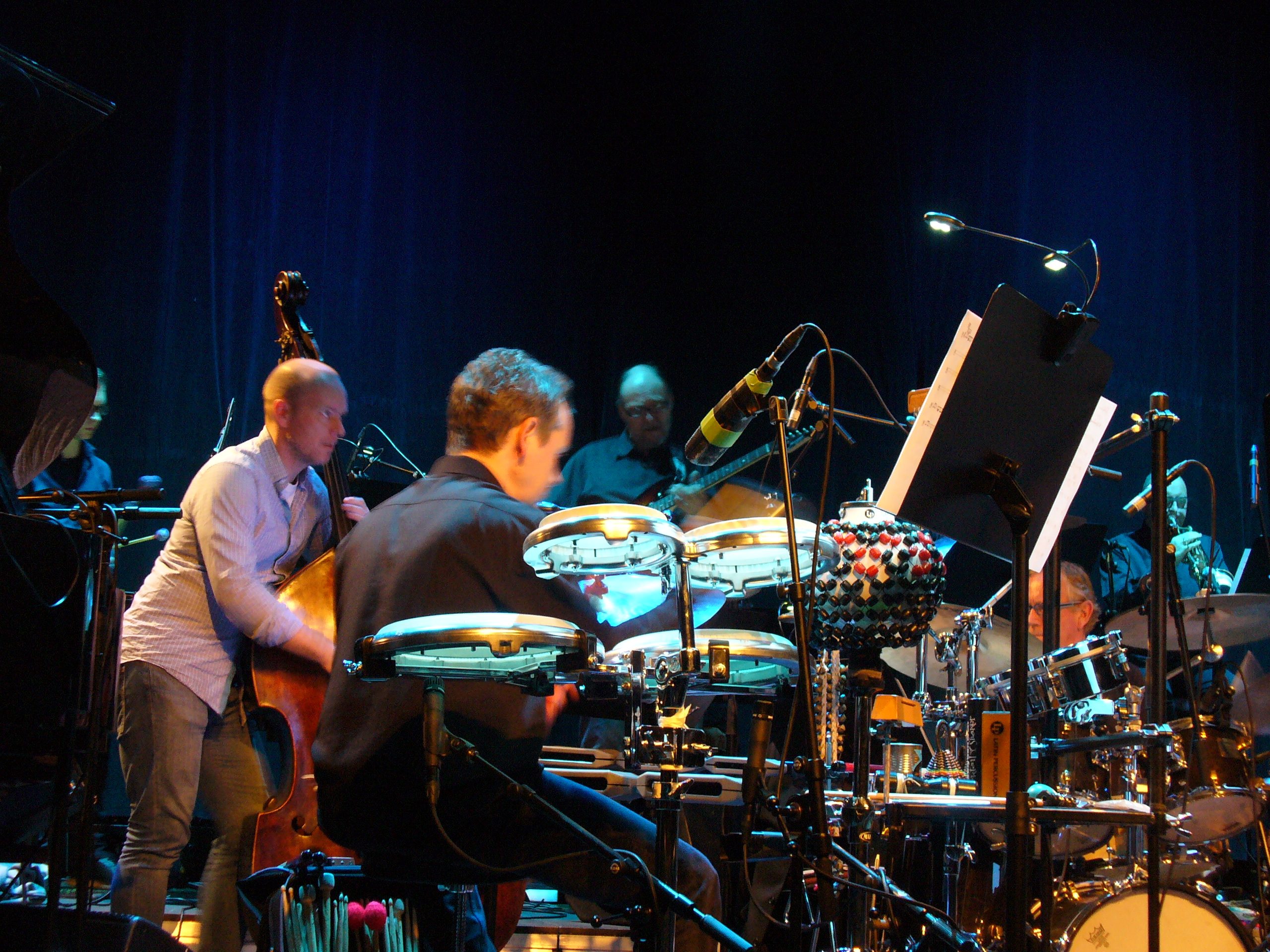
Ole Thomsen with BBB in 2014.

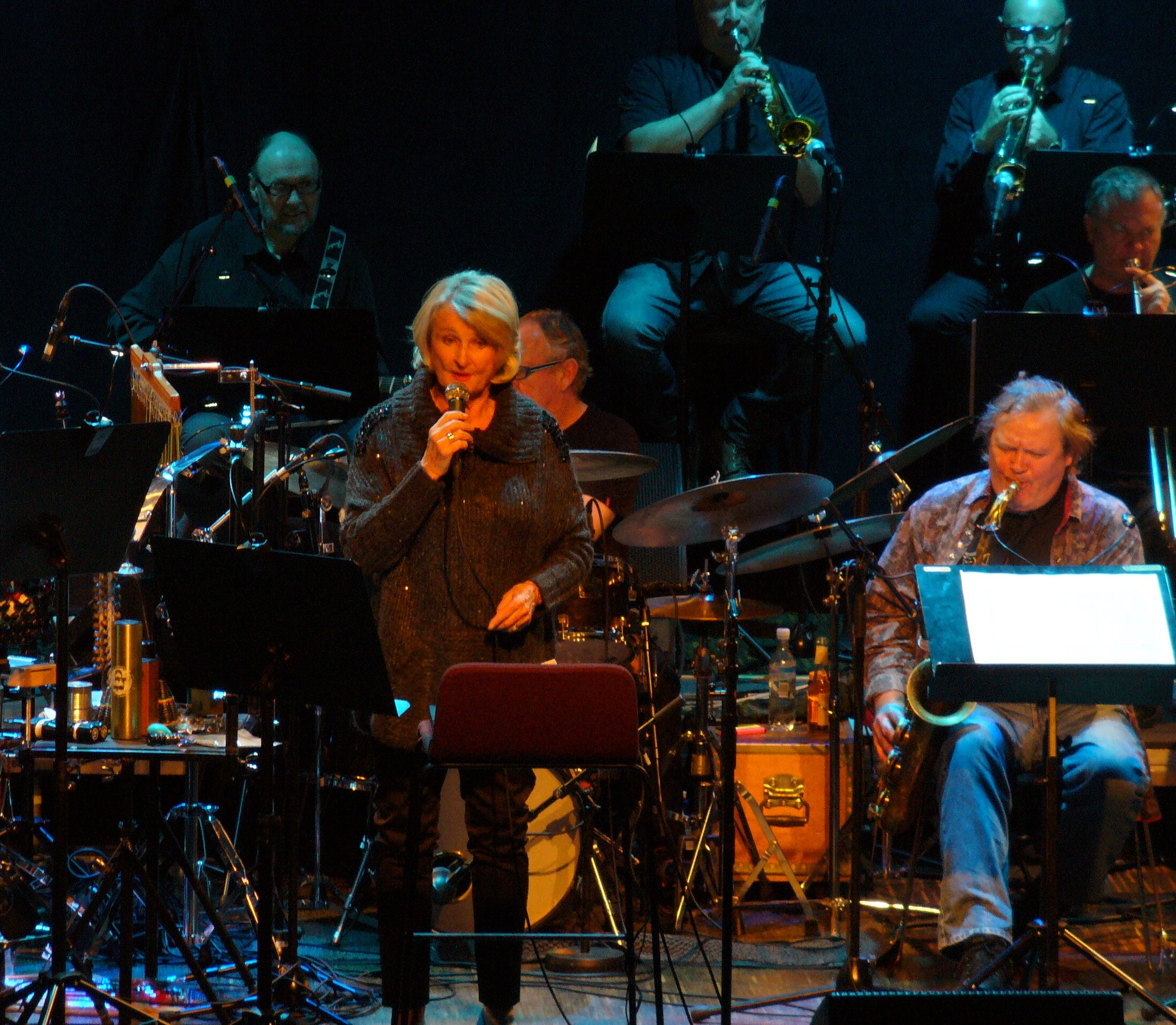
Karin Krog with Ole thomsen in the back to the left, during a concert with BBB in 2014.

The Jazz fusion inspired Thomson has contributed on at least 19 releases, such as in The Gambian/Norwegian Friendship Orchestra, Orchestra Ny Bris with Olav Dale, Per Jørgensen, Frank Jakobsen, Kåre Garnes og Dag Arnesen and Thomsens Loosebox with Ivar Kolve, Stein Inge Brækhus and Yngve Moe. From 1987 he led the band Hot Cargo, with Stein Inge Brækhus (drums), Olav Dale (saxophone), and Geir Rognø (bass) for the 1992 recording, and led the Ole Thomsen Group with Ingolv Haaland (piano), Stein Inge Brækhus (drums), Asbjørn Sundal (bass) and Torbjørn Hillersøy (bass). He also led the bands "Hot Cargo" at the Nattjazz 1988–95, and "Electric Heavyland" with co-musicians Harald Dahlstrøm (hammond organ), Øivind Lunde (bass guitar), Frank Jakobsen (drums), at the Nattjazz 1993.

Thomsen has featured on recordings with, among others, Ole Amund Gjersvik, Wenche Gausdal Kvintett, Dag Arnesen, Bergen Blues Band, Ove Thue, Kari Bremnes, Ole Paus, Hans Inge Fagervik.

== Discography ==
- 1981: Doktor Larsen (Sonet Records), with Doktor Larsen
- 1982: Ny Bris (Odin Records), with Dag Arnesen's Ny Bris
- 1982: Another Blues (Harvest, EMI Norway), with Bergen Blues Band
- 1982: The Gambian/Norwegian Friendship Orchestra (Odin Records)
- 1983: Blues Hit Me (Harvest, EMI Norway), with Bergen Blues Band
- 1988: Invisible dances, commissioned for Vossajazz, with the stage artist Nina Seim and musicians Helge Lilletvedt, Per Jørgensen, Yngve Moe & Stein Inge Brækhus
- 1992: Hot Cargo (NorCD), with Hot Cargo
- 1992: Nattjazz 20 År (Grappa Music), compilation with various artists
- 1996: Ankle deep, bestillingsverk til Nattjazz
- 1996: Forever Like A Child (ESR), with Eivind Løberg
- 2003: Adventures in European New Jazz And Improvised Music (Europe Jazz Oddysey), with Bergen Big Band fest. Mathias Rüegg "Art & Fun" on compilation with various artists
- 2004: Nærhet (Taurus Records), with Wenche Gausdal
- 2005: Seagull (Grappa Music), with Bergen Big Band feat. Karin Krog, directed by John Surman
- 2007: Meditations on Coltrane (Grappa Music), with Bergen Big Band feat. The Core
- 2008: Som den gyldne sol frembryter (Grappa Music), with Bergen Big Band
- 2010: Crime Scene (ECM Records), live with Bergen Big Band feat. Terje Rypdal
- 2012: Algeria (Losen Records), with Wenche Gausdal

== Awards ==
- Vossajazz Award 1989

Awards
Preceded by Olav Dale	Recipient of the Vossajazzprisen; 1989	Succeeded by Knut Kristiansen
