= Olav Dale =

Norwegian composer, orchestra leader and saxophonist (1958–2014)

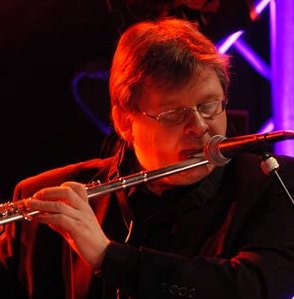

Background information
- Born: 30 October 1958; Voss Municipality, Norway
- Died: 10 October 2014 (aged 55)
- Genres: Jazz
- Occupation: Musician
- Instrument: Saxophone
- Formerly of: Bergen Big Band
- Website: olavdale.com

Olav Dale (30 October 1958 – 10 October 2014) was a Norwegian composer, orchestra leader and jazz saxophonist. In addition to saxophone he played other woodwinds. He received little formal education in music, but he completed studies at the Voss Folk High School and the Toneheim Folk High School (1976–78).

== Biography ==
After the debut at Vossajazz (1974) with the Voss Storband, Dale recorded with Bergen-based orchestras like the Bergen Blues Band (1975–84), Bergen Big Band with eg Knut Kristiansen's Monk Moods (1980), and with various multi-national orchestras like 'Son Mu' and 'The Gambian/Norwegian Friendship Orchestra'. He also played the winds on several releases with Dag Arnesen, such as 'Ny Bris' and 'Son Mu', and in the Oslo based bands like: 'E'Olen', Oslo 13 and 'Lille Frøen Saxofonkvartett'.

He started his own Quartet in 1995 and Olav Dale Quartet on the 1997 recording was Dag Arnesen (piano), Sébastien Dubé (bass) and Frank Jakobsen (drums). For the 2007 edition of the O. D. Quartet the line up is: Erik H. Halvorsen (keyboards), Stein Inge Brækhus (drums), Torbjørn Hillersøy (electric bass), and with this band Dale headed for India in the beginning of 2005 where he toured extensively the years to come. He also contributed on Jan Alexander Grieg & Arvid Genius' Reunion blues (1985) and Didrik Ingvaldsen's (History & movement).

During the 1990s he also played with great international jazz names such as Philip Catherine, Paquito D'Rivera, Claudio Roditi, Gustavo Bergalli, Phil Woods, Andy Shepherd, Bennie Wallace, Joe Henderson, Maria Schneider, Martial Solal, Diana Krall, Mathias Rüegg and Gianluigi Trovesi.

When Dale died October 10, 2014, after a period of illness, his family constituted a memorial fund. The first recipient of Olav Dale's Memorial Award was his Bergen Big Band.

== Band projects ==
- Olav Dale Quartet with different line ups
- Olav Dale Quintet with Dag Arnesen (piano), Morten Færestrand (guitar), Yngve Moe (bass) and Frank Jakobsen (drums)
- Grand Scale Trio with Ole Amund Gjersvik (double bass) og Stein Inge Brækhus (drums)
- Bergen Big Band, as Orchestra Leader
- Lille Frøen Saksofonkvartett as member (1986–89) with Odd Riisnæs (tenor), Vidar Johansen (baritone) og Arne Frang (tenor)
- Groovy (started 2002) as member with Mike Gallaher (guitar), Yngve Moe (bass) and Stein Inge Brækhus (drums)
- Gips Baga Bo Pooh (music for kids) as member with Per Jørgensen (voice, trumpet and more), Helge Lilletvedt (keyboards)
- Rolf Arild og Olav Jazz trio with Rolf Prestø (bass) and Arild Seim (guitar)

== Awards ==
- Gammleng-prisen 1991 in the class Session Musician.
- Vossajazz Award 1988
- Sildajazz Award 2008

== Discography ==
=== As leader ===
- 1997: Little waltz Olav Dale Quartet (NorCD)
- 2007: Dabrhahi (NorCD)

=== As sideman ===
With Dag Arnesen's Ny Bris

- 1982: Ny Bris (Odin)

With Bergen Big Band

- 2005: Seagull (Grappa)
- 2007: Meditations on Coltrane with The Core (Grappa)
- 2008: Som den gyldne sol frembryter (Grappa)
- 2010: Crime Scene (ECM)
- 2014: Another Sky (Grappa)

With Gambian/Norwegian Friendship Orchestra

- 1982: Friendship (Odin)

Awards
Preceded by First award 1988	Recipient of the Vossajazzprisen; 1988	Succeeded by Ole Thomsen
Preceded by Christina Bjordal	Recipient of the Sildajazzprisen; 2008	Succeeded by Sigurd Ulveseth
