= Svein Folkvord =

Norwegian musician, sound engineer and composer

- Born: May 18, 1967 (age 58); Stavanger, Norway
- Genres: Jazz
- Instrument: Bass guitar

Svein Folkvord (born 18 May 1967) is a Norwegian Jazz musician (double bass), sound engineer and composer, known from cooperations with Andy Sheppard, Paolo Fresu, Knut Kristiansen, John Pål Inderberg, Per Jørgensen, Phil McDermott, Jack Wilkins, Håkon Mjaset Johansen, Nils-Olav Johansen and Sverre Gjørvad.

== Career ==
Folkvord is educated on the Jazz program at Norges Teknisk-Naturvitenskapelige Universitet and holds a Master in music and MSc. in acoustics (1987 - 1992).

In Trondheim he played with «Kjellerbandet», Trøndelag Teater, and Sverre Gjørvad and Nils-Olav Johansen in the band «Storytellers» releasing the album Enjoy Storytellers! (1994). Until 1998 he was a regional musician in the Northern Norway, such in cooperation with Knut Kristiansen. In the Cool jazz and Free jazz band «Subtrio» (established 1999) he plays with John Pål Inderberg saxophone and Stein Inge Brækhus drums. The trio toured in Norway with Paolo Fresu (trumpet) among others.

Folkvord received considerable attention for his commissioned work to Vossajazz 2004, appearing on the album Across (2004), accompanied by Jazz greats Andy Sheppard and John Pål Inderberg (saxophones), Andreas Aase (guitar), Per Jørgensen and Staffan Svensson (trumpet), and the percussion ensemble Drums Across.

Later he toured with Phil McDermott, Jack Wilkins and Håkon Mjåset Johansen, and on MaiJazz 2005 he performed with saxophonist Tor Yttredal's «Cucumber» (Wayne Brasel guitar, Alan Jones drums and Vigleik Storaas piano). Folkvord is teaching Jazz bass for the Department of Music and Dance at the University of Stavanger.

== Discography ==
Solo projects

- 2004: Across (Vossajazz Records)

With Storytellers

1994: Enjoy Storytellers (Curling Legs)

With Subtrio

- 2006: Subtrio (Vossajazz Records)
- 2007: Live At Sting (Dravle Records), featuring Paolo Fresu
