= Frank Jakobsen =

Norwegian jazz drummer (born 1954)

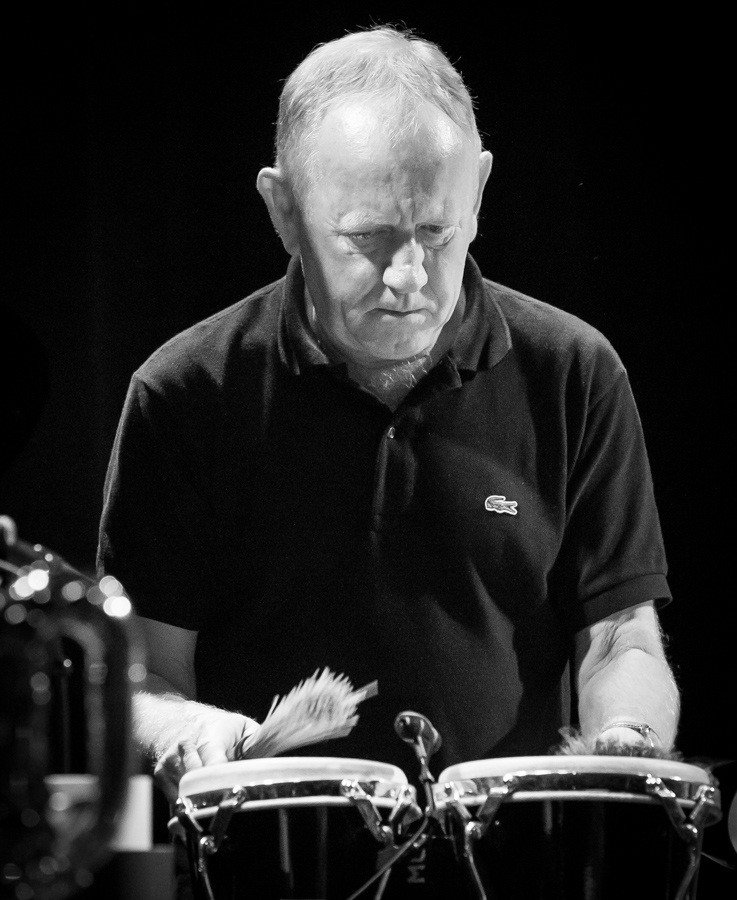
- Jakobsen at Victoria during the 2016 Oslo Jazzfestival.

Background information
- Born: 28 April 1954 (age 72); Bergen, Norway
- Origin: Norwegian
- Genres: Jazz
- Occupations: Musician and composer
- Instrument: Drums

Frank Jakobsen (born 28 April 1954) is a Norwegian jazz musician (drums), known from a number of recordings, and central to the jazz scenes in Bergen and Oslo.

== Career ==
Jakobsen was born and raised in Bergen, where he played in local groups like Danmarks Plass Rock & Jazz (1974–80), Frk. Pirk (1976–78), Bergen Big Band, Trang Fødsel and Son Mu among others. He played with jazz musicians like Dag Arnesen, Knut Kristiansen, Vigleik Storaas, Olav Dale, Jan Kåre Hystad. During a period where he lived in Oslo he cooperated with Cutting Edge, Thorgeir Stubø, Knut Riisnæs, Paul Weeden, Guttorm Guttormsen, Søyr, Rune Klakegg, Rob Waring and Carl Morten Iversen.

== Honors ==
- Vossajazzprisen (1997)

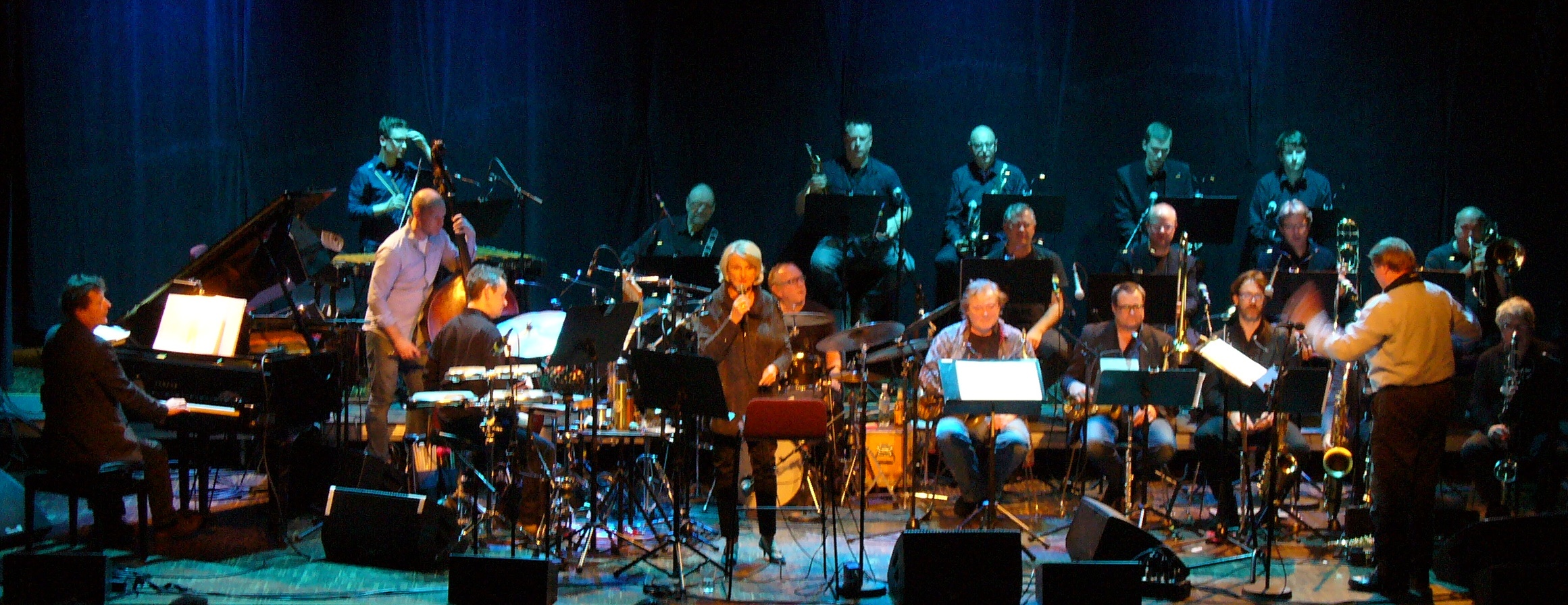
Jakobsen with Bergen Big Band at USF Verftet, Bergen 2014.

== Discography (in selection) ==
Within Dag Arnesen's "Ny Bris»

- 1982: Ny Bris (Odin Records)

Within Cutting Edge

- 1982: Cutting Edge (Odin Records)
- 1984: Our Man in Paradise (Odin Records)
- 1995: Alle tre (Curling Legs)

With Carl Morten Iversen and Rob Waring

- 1992: Secret Red Thread (Odin Records)

Within Rune Klakegg Trio

- 1992: Anaerobics (Odin Records)

With Knut Kristiansen

- 1995: Monk Moods (Odin Records)

With Olav Dale Quartet

- 1997: Little Waltz (NorCD), including Sebastian Dubé & Dag Arnesen

Within Bergen Big Band

- 2003: Adventures in European New Jazz And Improvised Music (Europe Jazz Oddysey), with Mathias Rüegg "Art & Fun" on compilation with various artists
- 2005: Seagull (Grappa Music), feat. Karin Krog conducted by John Surman recorded at the Nattjazz Festival, Bergen 2004
- 2007: Meditations on Coltrane (Grappa Music), with The Core
- 2008: Som den gyldne sol frembryter (Grappa Music)
- 2010: Crime Scene (ECM Records), with Terje Rypdal recorded at the Nattjazz Festival, Bergen 2009

With other projects

- 1992: Nattjazz 20 år (Grappa Music)
- 1995: Den lilla kvelven (Nimis), with Kenneth Sivertsen, poems written and read by Jon Fosse
- 1996: Jazz Out of Norway (Odin Records), sampler
- 1997: Med kjøtt og kjærlighet ((Curling Legs)), within Søyr, poetry by Niels Fredrik Dahl and Torgeir Rebolledo Pedersen
- 1997: Hybel (Norsk Plateproduksjon), within Trang Fødsel
- 1998: Close to My Heart (Ponca Jazz Records), with Finn Hauge (including Olga Konkova & Terje Gewelt)
- 1999: Cocoon (Acoustic Records), with "Cocoon" (including Barbro Husdal, Carsten Dyngeland & Sigurd Ulveset)
- 2000: City Dust (Curling Legs), with Helén Eriksen
- 2001: Touching (Resonant Music), with Knut Riisnæs
- 2001: Synchronize Your Watches (Resonant Music), within Rob Waring Trio
- 2002: Julestemning (Lynor), with "Bergen Nord Kammerkor" conducted by Bjørn Berentsen
- 2003: Hush Hush (EMI Music, Norway), with Nathalie Nordnes
- 2004: Reworks; :.What Kind of Machine Is This? (), with Chillienuts
- 2005: De aller beste (Sony BMG Music), with Trang Fødsel
- 2005: Seagull (Grappa Music), within Bergen Big Band feat. Karin Krog & John Surman
- 2005: Join Me in the Park (EMI Music, Norway), with Nathalie Nordnes
- 2006: Vargtime 2 – Four Cousins (Gemini Records), within Jan Kåre Hystad Kvartett
- 2006: Barna synger Pophits (Barneselskapet)
- 2011: Live in Bergen (Acoustic Records), with Ole Amund Gjersvik

Awards
Preceded by Terje Isungset	Recipient of the Vossajazzprisen; 1997	Succeeded by Sigurd Ulveseth
