= Magne Thormodsæter =

Norwegian jazz upright bassist and composer (born 1973)

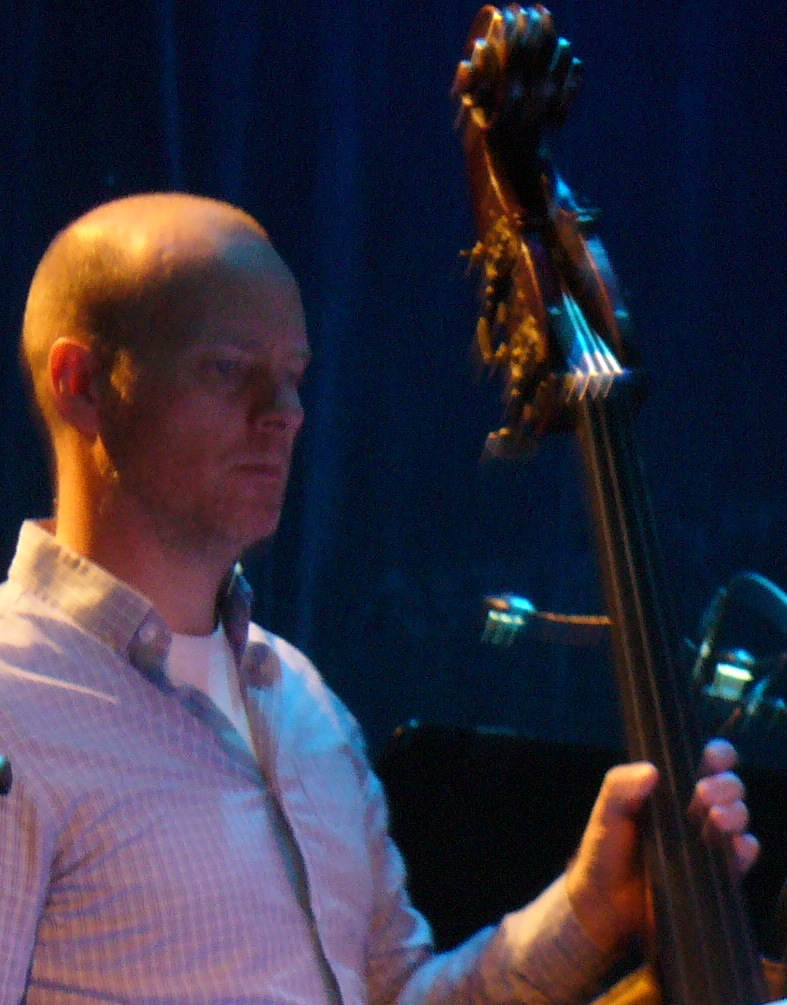
- Thormodsæter in 2014

Background information
- Born: 8 July 1973 (age 53); Bergen, Hordaland, Norway
- Genres: Jazz
- Occupation: Musician
- Instrument: Upright bass

Magne Thormodsæter (born 8 July 1973) is a Norwegian jazz musician (upright bass) and composer, known from a dozen releases and cooperations with the likes of Terje Rypdal, Ståle Storløkken, Paolo Vinaccia, Karin Krog and John Surman.

== Career ==
Thormodsæter was born in Bergen. He was educated on the Jazz program at Trondheim Musikkonservatorium, and is now associate Professor at Griegakademiet, Department of Music, University of Bergen. He has his own M.T. Trio, and also plays within bands like "Bungalow", Knut Kristiansen Trio, Lena Skjerdal Trio, Qvales Ensemble, The Wedding and Zumo.

== Honors ==
- Vossajazzprisen 2004

== Discography ==
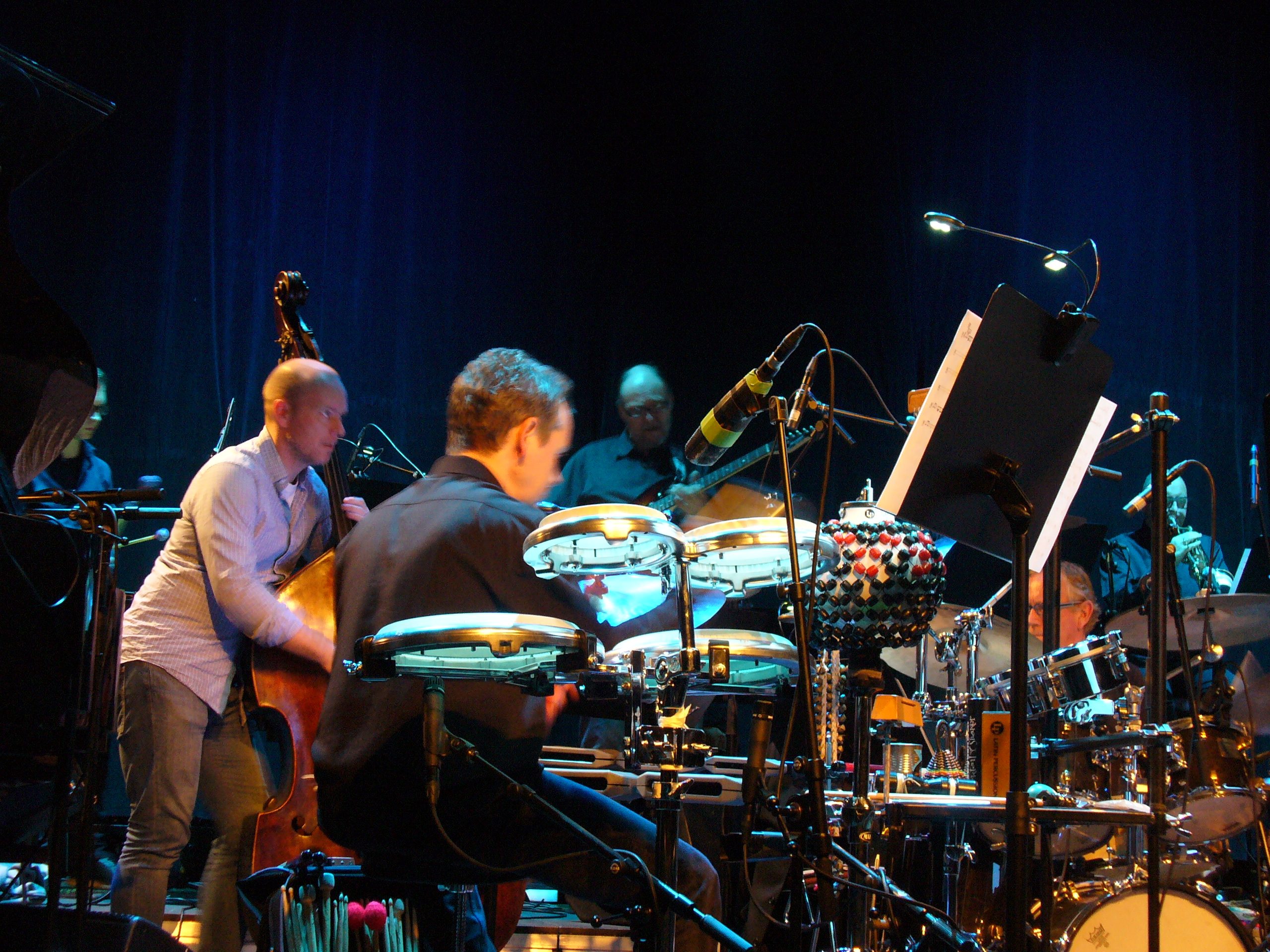
Thormodsæter with BBB 2014.

Within Bergen Big Band

- 2003: Adventures in European New Jazz and Improvised Music (Europe Jazz Oddysey), with Mathias Rüegg "Art & Fun" on compilation with various artists
- 2005: Seagull (Grappa), feat. Karin Krog conducted by John Surman recorded at the Nattjazz Festival, Bergen 2004
- 2007: Meditations on Coltrane (Grappa), with The Core
- 2008: Som den gyldne sol frembryter (Grappa)
- 2010: Crime Scene (ECM), with Terje Rypdal recorded at the Nattjazz Festival, Bergen 2009

Collaborations

- 2000: City Dust (Curling Legs), with Helén Eriksen
- 2003: Adventures in European New Jazz and Improvised Music (Europe Jazz Odyssey), with various artists
- 2004: Grønn (Kirkelig Kulturverksted), with Qvales Ensemble
- 2005: Siste Stikk (MajorStudio), with Vamp
- 2005: Join Me in the Park (EMI, Norway), with Nathalie Nordnes
- 2005: Inventio (Jazzaway), within Svein Olav Herstad Trio including Håkon Mjåset Johansen
- 2008: The Good or Better Side of Things (Kirkelig Kulturverksted), with "Garness»
- 2012: Jeg Har Vel Ingen Kjærere (Plush Badger Music), with Anne Gravir Klykken

Awards
Preceded by Kåre Opheim	Recipient of the Vossajazzprisen; 2004	Succeeded by Berit Opheim
