= Tone Lise Moberg =

Norwegian singer

- Born: 1 April 1971 (age 54); Os Municipality, Norway
- Origin: Norway
- Genres: Jazz
- Occupations: Singer, musician, composer
- Instrument: Vocals
- Labels: NorCD
- Website: www.tonelisemoberg.com

Tone Lise Moberg (born 1 April 1970 in Os Municipality, Norway) is a Norwegian singer and song teacher.

== Biography ==
Moberg acquired jazz by writing songs at the piano and doing her own versions of jazz standards. She studied jazz at Guildhall School of Music and Drama, formed several bands, and performed on jazzfestivals and jazzclubs in Norway. She also lived and performed in England for many years as song student of the Leeds City College. She was based in Trondheim for some years while attending the Jazz program at Norwegian University of Science and Technology (NTNU), before settling down in Bergen. Here she studied at the Grieg Academy. Her debut solo album Looking On (2006) was recorded with drummer Stein Inge Brækhus, bassist Torbjørn Hillersøy, keyboarder Eivind Austad, and trumpeter Snorre Farstad.

== Discography ==
=== Solo albums ===
- 2006: Looking On (NorCD)

=== Collaborations ===
With Tore Dimmestøl

- 1995: Bird Colony (Origo Sound)

With Ole Amund Gjersvik

- 1998: Milonga Triste (Acoustic Records)

With Unge Frustrerte Menn

- 2001: Dronningen Av Kalde Føtter (Grappa)
