= Kåre Opheim =

Norwegian drummer

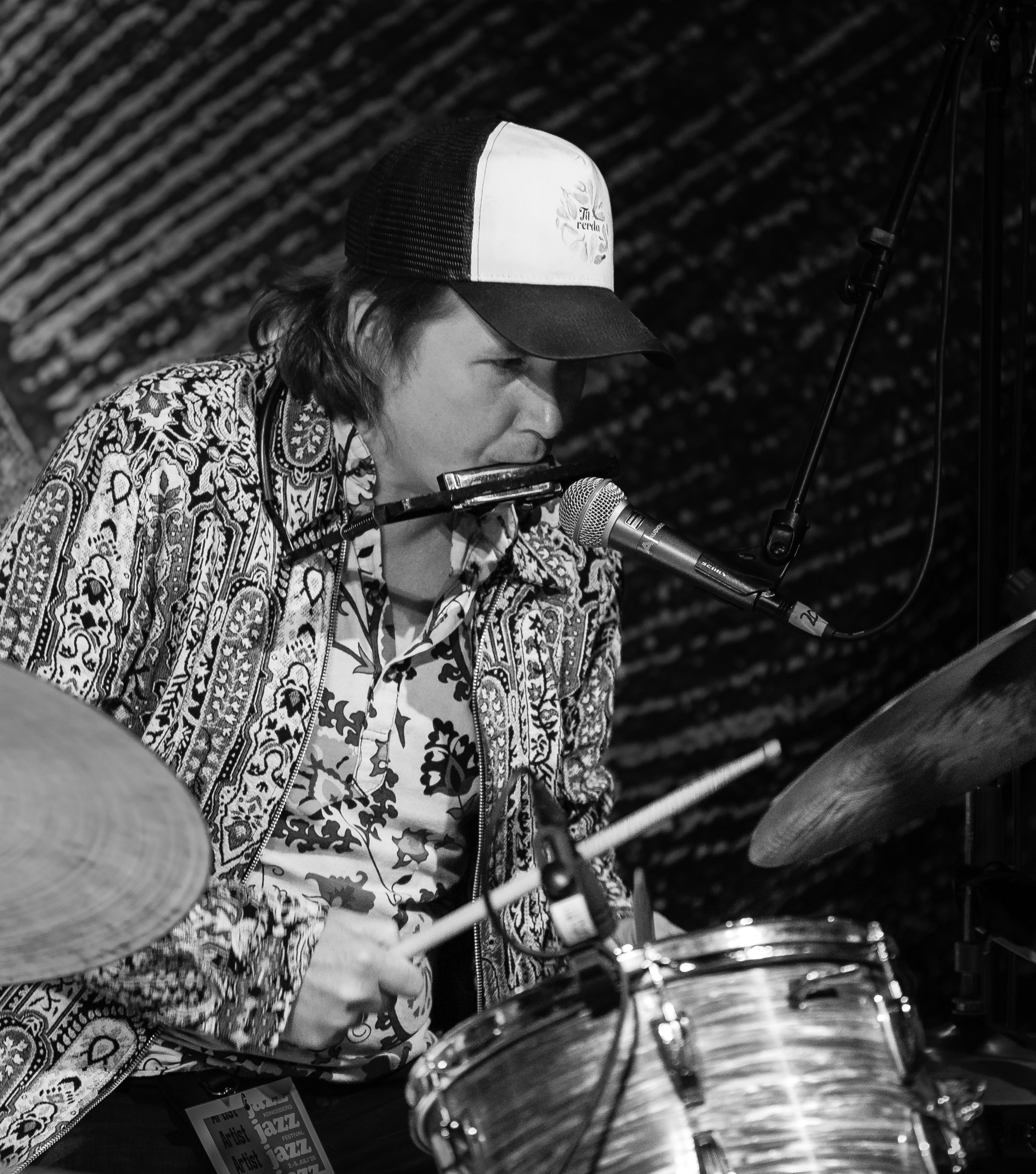
- Kåre Opheim performing at Christians Kjeller, Kongsberg 2025; Photo: Tore Sætre

Background information
- Born: 2 October 1975 (age 50); Voss Municipality, Hordaland
- Origin: Norway
- Genres: Jazz, folk, rock
- Occupations: Musician, composer
- Instrument: Drums
- Member of: Real Ones
- Website: www.groove.no/artist/11439882/kare-opheim

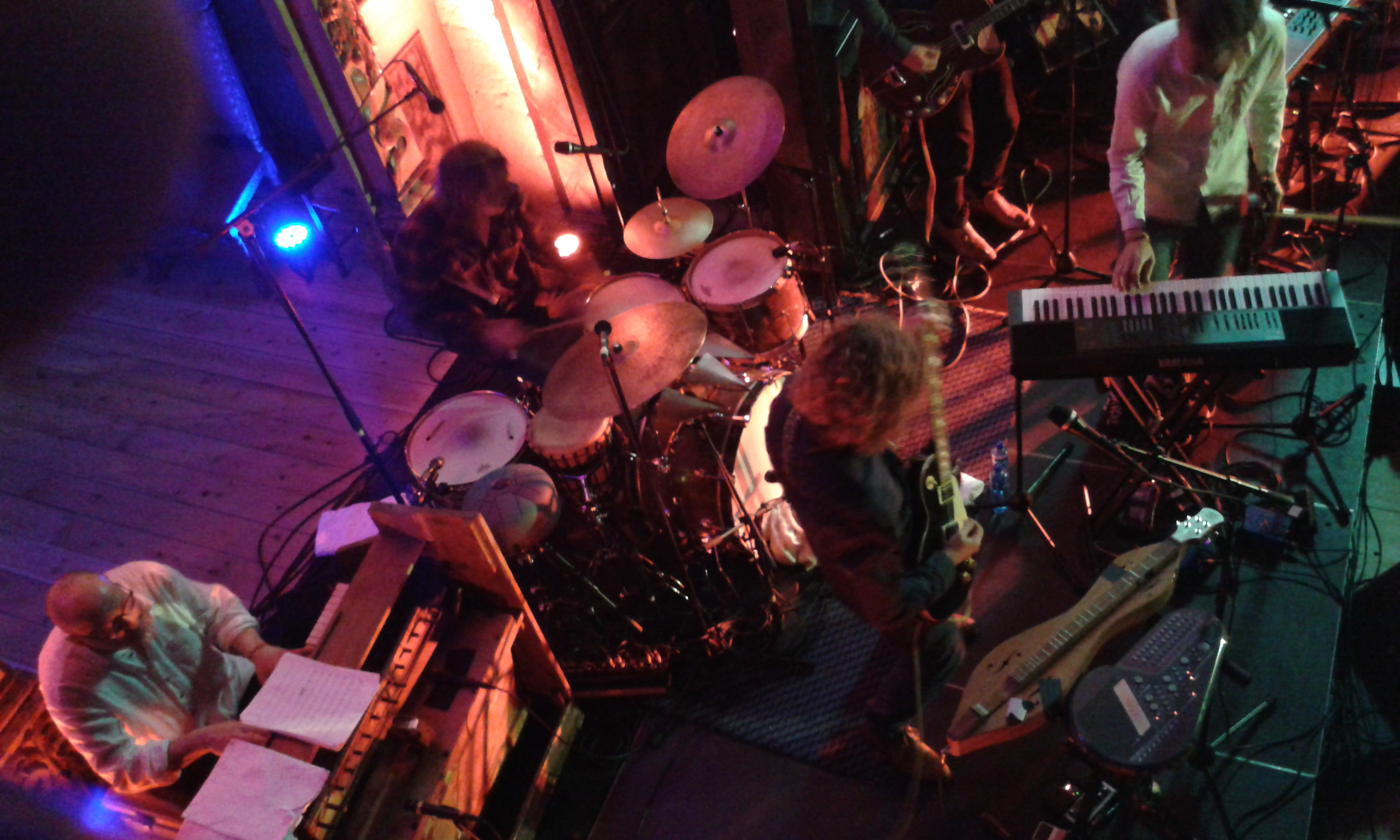
Opheim with Sigbjørn Apeland and Real Ones at Vossajazz 2015.

Kåre Opheim (born 2 October 1975 in Voss Municipality, Norway) is a Norwegian musician (drums), known from a series of albums and bands like Real Ones.

Opheim is an important partner in the "UNGjaJazzja" at Vossajazz. He is part of the Mads Berven Trio with a record release Mountains & the Sea in 2011, and played within Mike Gallaher Trio at Vossajazz 2009.

== Honors ==
- Vossajazzprisen 2003

== Discography ==
With Real Ones

- 2002: This Is Camping (New Records, Norway)
- 2008: All for the Neighbourhood (Warner Music, Norway)

With Nathalie Nordnes

- 2003: Hush Hush (EMI Music, Norway)
- 2005: Join Me in the Park

With others

- 1998: Draum (Draum Records), with "Draum" (Morten Arnetvedt, Ingvild Bræin, Marius Larsen & Rikke Eri)
- 2002: It's A Record (New Records, Norway), with "Sergeant Petter"
- 2003: Pigs (Bluebox Records), with Heidi Marie Vestrheim
- 2003: Heim Te Mor (Universal Music, Norway), with Odd Nordstoga
- 2008: Song, Trø Lett På Hjarta Mitt (Crystal Air Records), with Berit Opheim
- 2011: Mountains & the Sea (Komanche), with his M.B. Trio

Awards
Preceded by Thomas T. Dahl	Recipient of the Vossajazzprisen; 2003	Succeeded by Magne Thormodsæter
