= Bergen Big Band =

Norwegian big band

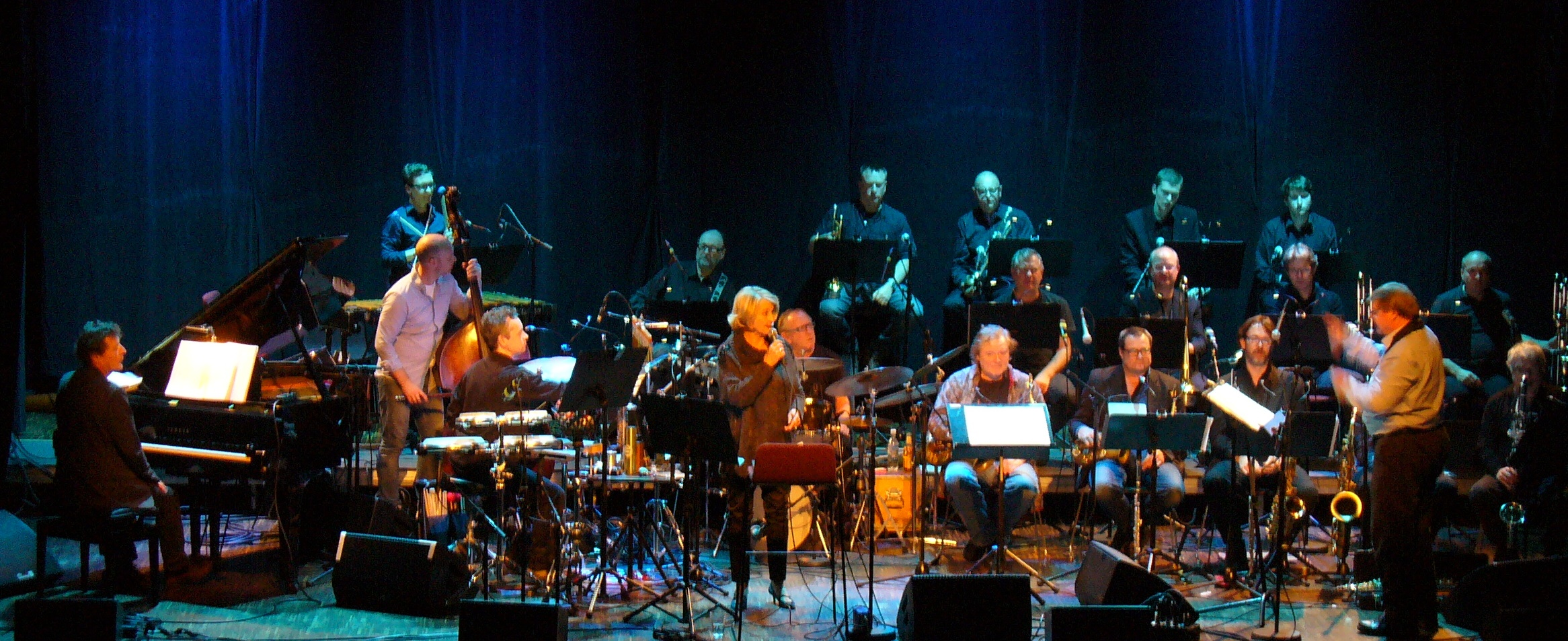
- Bergen Big Band at a memorial concert for Olav Dale, November 2, 2014

Background information
- Origin: Bergen, Norway
- Genres: Jazz, big band
- Years active: 1991–present
- Labels: ECM, Grappa
- Members: Elisabeth Lid Trøen; Jan Kåre Hystad; Ole Jacob Hystad; Zoltan Vincze; Michael Barnes; Martin Winter; Svein Henrik Giske; Are Ovesen; Reid Gilje; Øyvind Hage; Sindre Dalhaug; Pål Roseth; Kjell Erik Husom; Ole Thomsen; Dag Arnesen; Magne Thormodsæter; Frank Jakobsen
- Past members: Olav Dale (1958 – 2014)

Bergen Big Band (BBB) is a Norwegian big band established 1991 as a continuation of Knut Kristiansen's Bergen Band. BBB is known from cooperations with musicians like Phil Woods, Paquito D'Rivera, Joe Henderson, Maria Schneider, Diana Krall, Sissel Kyrkjebø, Andy Sheppard, Martial Solal, Mathias Rüegg, Gianluigi Trovesi, Mathias Eick, Ole Kock Hansen, Etta Cameron, Karin Krog, John Surman, Dino Saluzzi, Gustavo Bergalli, Berit Opheim, Jan Magne Førde, The Core, Ab und Zu, Vidar Johansen, Paolo Vinaccia, Ståle Storløkken, Palle Mikkelborg and Terje Rypdal among others.

== Biography ==
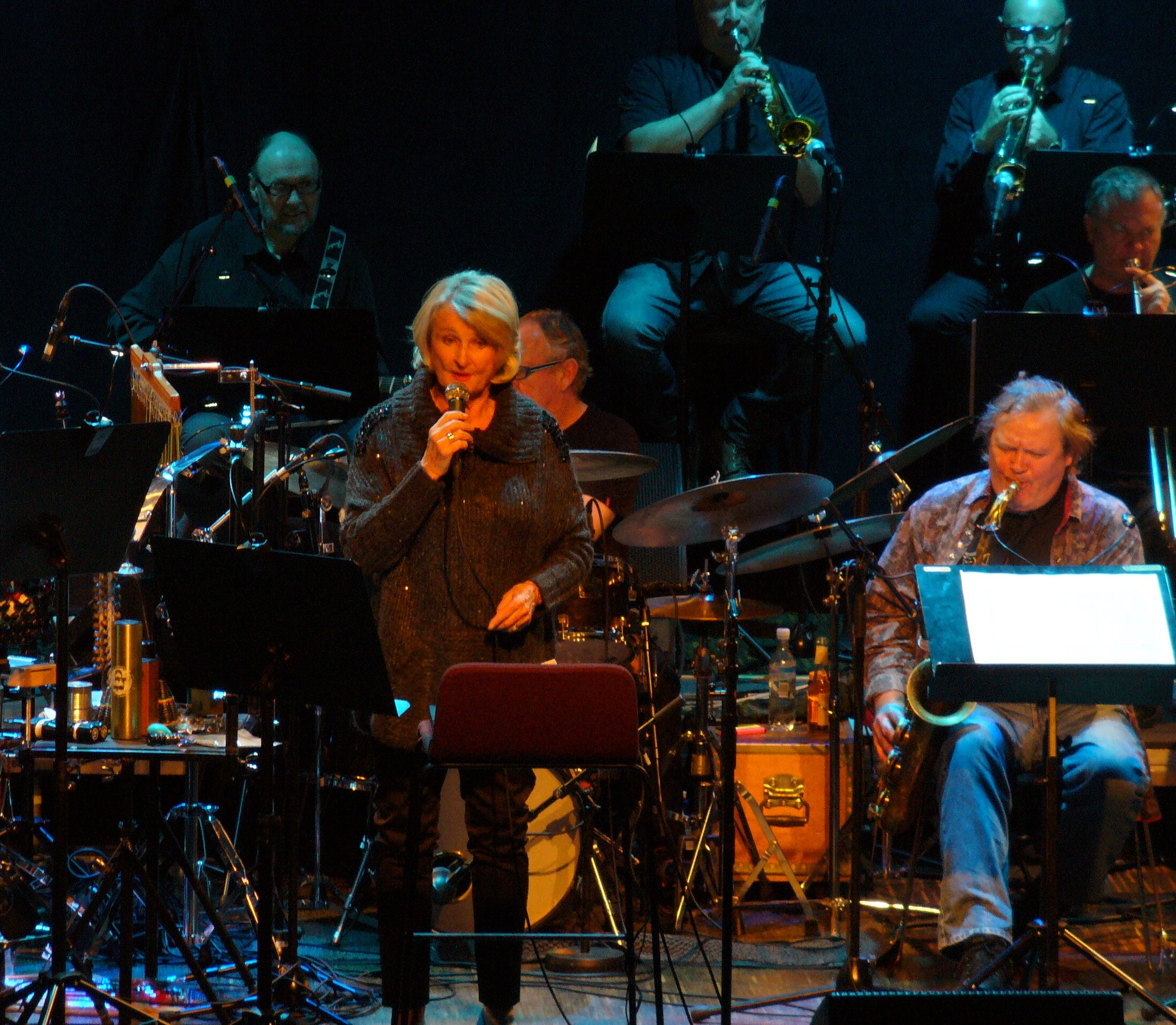
Karin Krog with BBB in 2014.

Olav Dale was musical leader of the band the entire period 1991-2014. In 1995, BBB, Nattjazz and Vossajazz made an agreement to make an annual project with the band over a three-year period. The collaboration has continued thereafter. In 1999, the West Norwegian Jazz Center took over as administrative leaders of the band.

In 2005 they released the studio album Seagull, with Karin Krog conducted by John Surman. In 2007 they released the album Meditations on Coltrane, from a concert at Nattjazz featuring The Core, the same year. Crime Scene (2010) recorded at Nattjazz 2910, featuring Terje Rypdal, Palle Mikkelborg, Ståle Storløkken and Paolo Vinaccia, at the ECM label.

November 2, 2004 the band was joined by Karin Krog and John Surman, for a memorial concert for the bands late leader Olav Dale at USF, Verftet in Bergen.

== Current members ==
Woodwinds

- Elisabeth Lid Trøen
- Jan Kåre Hystad
- Ole Jakob Hystad
- Zoltan Vincze
- Michael Barnes

Trumpets

- Martin Winter
- Svein Henrik Giske
- Are Ovesen
- Reid Gilje

Trombones

- Øyvind Hage
- Sindre Dalhaug
- Pål Roseth
- Kjell Erik Husom

Rhythm section

- Ole Thomsen guitar
- Thomas T. Dahl guitar
- Dag Arnesen piano
- Magne Thormodsæter bass
- Frank Jakobsen drums

== Honors ==
- 2015: First Olav Dale's Memorial Award

== Discography ==
=== Albums ===
- 2003: Adventures In European New Jazz And Improvised Music (Europe Jazz Oddysey), with Mathias Rüegg "Art & Fun" on compilation with various artists
- 2005: Seagull (Grappa Music), feat. Karin Krog conducted by John Surman recorded at the Nattjazz Festival, Bergen 2004
- 2007: Meditations on Coltrane (Grappa Music), with The Core
- 2008: Som den gyldne sol frembryter (Grappa Music)
- 2010: Crime Scene (ECM Records), with Terje Rypdal recorded at the Nattjazz Festival, Bergen 2009
- 2014: Another Sky (Grappa Music), with John Surman
- 2016: Kuria Suite (Grappa Music), with Knut Kristiansen
- 2017: Norwegian Song IV (Odin Records|Odin), with Dag Arnesen

=== Contributors ===
| | Seagull | Meditations on Coltrane | Crime Scene |
|---|---|---|---|
| Pål Roseth - trombone | Contributed | Contributed | Contributed |
| Sindre Dalhaug - trombone | Contributed | Contributed | Contributed |
| Øyvind Hage - trombone | Contributed | Contributed | Contributed |
| Kjell Erik Husom - bass trombone | Contributed | Contributed | Contributed |
| Michael Barnes - baritone saxophone, bass clarinet | Contributed | Contributed | Contributed |
| Zoltan Vincze - tenor saxophone | Contributed | Contributed | Contributed |
| Olav Dale - flute, alto flute, piccolo, bass clarinet, alto saxophone | Contributed | Contributed | Contributed |
| Jan Kåre Hystad - alto flute, clarinet, bass clarinet | Contributed | Did not contribute | Contributed |
| Ole Jacob Hystad - clarinet, tenor saxophone | Contributed | Contributed | Contributed |
| Øystein Søbstad - alt saxophone, alto flute, flute | Contributed | Contributed | Did not contribute |
| Kjetil Møster - tenor saxophone | Did not contribute | Contributed | Did not contribute |
| John Surman - baritone saxophone, soprano saxophone | Contributed | Did not contribute | Did not contribute |
| Palle Mikkelborg - trumpet | Did not contribute | Did not contribute | Contributed |
| Martin Winter - trumpet, flugelhorn | Contributed | Contributed | Contributed |
| Svein Henrik Giske - trumpet, flugelhorn | Contributed | Contributed | Contributed |
| Reid Gilje - trumpet, flugelhorn | Contributed | Contributed | Did not contribute |
| Are Ovesen - trumpet, flugelhorn | Contributed | Contributed | Contributed |
| Karin Krog - vocals | Contributed | Did not contribute | Did not contribute |
| Magne Thormodsæter - double bass, electric bass | Contributed | Contributed | Contributed |
| Steinar Raknes - double bass | Did not contribute | Contributed | Did not contribute |
| Terje Rypdal - guitar | Did not contribute | Did not contribute | Contributed |
| Ole Thomsen - guitar | Contributed | Contributed | Contributed |
| Paolo Vinaccia - drums, sampler | Did not contribute | Did not contribute | Contributed |
| Frank Jakobsen - drums, percussion | Contributed | Contributed | Contributed |
| Stein Inge Brækhus - percussion | Contributed | Contributed | Did not contribute |
| Ivar Kolve - vibraphone | Did not contribute | Did not contribute | Contributed |
| Ståle Storløkken - hammond B-3 organ | Did not contribute | Did not contribute | Contributed |
| Dag Arnesen - piano, electric piano | Contributed | Contributed | Did not contribute |
| Erlend Slettevoll - piano | Did not contribute | Contributed | Did not contribute |
| Helge Lilletvedt - electric piano | Did not contribute | Contributed | Contributed |
