= Helge Lilletvedt =

Norwegian jazz pianist, composer and arranger

- Born: 13 June 1964 (age 61); Bergen, Norway
- Genres: Jazz, pop, folk, rock, hip hop, musical theatre, classical
- Occupations: Musician, composer, arranger, producer
- Instruments: Piano, keyboards

Helge Lilletvedt (born 13 June 1964 in Bergen, Norway) is a Norwegian jazz pianist, keyboardist, composer and arranger, known from collaborations and album releases with Herborg Kråkevik, Anne Dorte Michelsen, Vamp, Göran Fristorp, Terje Rypdal, Vigleik Storaas, Arve Henriksen, Per Jørgensen, Olav Dale, Helén Eriksen, Ole Amund Gjersvik.

== Career ==
Lilletvedt studied classical piano with Jiri Hlinka and music theory at Bergen Music Conservatory (1983-1987), today known as the Grieg Academy (University of Bergen). In recent years he has worked as assistant professor at the same institution.

In the 1980’s Lilletvedt started freelancing in classical, modern contemporary, jazz, and pop music, playing a wide range of keyboard instruments, focusing on piano. In addition to clubs and jazz festivals, he started working as musician, composer, arranger, and musical director at Den Nationale Scene where he has since collaborated on more than 40 different productions. He has also worked at Det Vestnorske Teateret (Hordaland Teater), Beaivváš Sámi Našunálateáhter and Nordland Teater.

During the 1990’s Lilletvedt continued working in theatre as well as composing for film, video, and visual arts and playing extended solo-improvisations to screenings of silent movies such as The Birth of a Nation and La Passion de Jeanne d’Arc at the cinematheque in Bergen. He contributed to numerous recordings, including several recipients of Spellemannsprisen.

In the early 2000’s Lilletvedt wrote string arrangements for the Trondheim Soloists and played on “Kråkeviks Songbok” (2000) by Herborg Kråkevik receiving 4 x platinum sales in Norway. His particular take on traditional songs, string arrangements, and piano playing was also heard on “Fred hviler over land og by” (2001) by Danish singer Anne Dorte Michelsen and “Siste stikk” (2005) by Vamp.

== Honors ==
- Vossajazzprisen 1999

== Discography ==
=== Solo albums ===
- 1996: A Textile Soundscape

=== Collaborative works ===
With Jiri Hlinka

- 1985: Jiri Hlinka med Studenter (VestNorsk Plateselskap)

With various artists

- 1986: Knut Gribb tar Bergenstoget (Polygram)
- 1996: Blue Moods – New Voices, New Directions – Blue Notables Vol. 9 (Blue Note)
- 1996: XX (Vossajazz)
- 2010: Våkenatt For Hardanger (Kirkelig Kulturverksted)

With Seglem/Thomsen/Gjersvik (Producer)

- 1988: Poems for Trio (Hot Club Records)

With Ole Amund Gjersvik

- 1990: A Voice from the Past (Acoustic Records)
- 1992: Appasionata Criminelle (Acoustic Records)
- 1993: Alone In the Crowd (Acoustic Records)
- 1995: Around the Fountain (Acoustic Records)
- 2002 Combo Tango Plays Music by Ole A. Gjersvik (Acoustic Records)
- 2013: Latin Collection (Acoustic Records)

With Gustav Lorentzen

- 1995: Kanskje Kommer Kongen (CNR Music)

With Herborg Kråkevik

- 1995: Mi Haugtussa (Norsk Plateproduksjon)
- 2000: Kråkeviks Songbok (Universal Music)
- 2001: Songen Om Mitt Liv (Universal Music)
- 2002: Eg og Edith (Universal Music)
- 2008: Annleis Enn I Går (Sonet, Universal Music)
- 2009: Kvar Ein Dag (Universal Music)
- 2011: Alltid I Mitt Sinn (Universal Music)
- 2012: Jul I Stova (Universal Music)
- 2020: Juleroser (Grappa)

With Helen Eriksen

- 1996: Standards (Blue Note)
- 1998: Lovevirgin (Blue Note)

With Jan Bang

- 1997: Pop Killer (Virgin)

With N'Light'N

- 1998: Dedication (Tee Productions)

With Merethe Mikkelsen Band

- 1999: Where Do You Start feat. Toots Thielemans (Force Majeure)

With Vamp

- 2000: En Annen Sol (MajorStudio)
- 2002: Månemann (MajorStudio)
- 2005: Siste Stikk (MajorStudio)
- 2006: Denne Uro/I Full Symfoni (MajorStudio)

With Anne Dorte Michelsen

- 2001: Fred Hviler Over Land Og By (Medley Records, EMI)
- 2003: Stille Som Sne (Sony)

With Jan Eggum (Arranger)

- 2001: Ekte Eggum (Grappa)

With Millpond Moon

- 2001: Nation of Two (Bergen Records)
- 2015: Time To Turn the Tide (Tikopia Records)

With Göran Fristorp

- 2004: Pie Jesu (DownBeach)
- 2008: Min Lyckas Hus (DaWorks)

With Rein Alexander (Arranger)

- 2004: Rein Alexander (Sony)

With Beate Jacobsen

- 2005: Coming Up (LimitCycle)

With Haugesund Popensemble (Arranger)

- 2006: Skyld På Meg (MajorStudio)

With Bergen Big Band (Producer)

- 2008 Som Den Gyldne Sol (Grappa)

With Merete Arnevåg

- 2008 Somerfuglhagen (Make Music AS)

With Terje Rypdal, within Bergen Big Band

- 2010: Crime Scene (ECM)

With Jan Frode I. Christensen

- 2011 Sannsynligvis Eg (Filter)

With Tomine Mikkeline

- 2012: Tomine Mikkeline (Universal Music)

With Jan Kåre Hystad

- 2013: Listen Alone (Acoustic Records)

With Ingvild Lilletvedt Nordstoga

- 2014: Den Minste Caféen (Plassen Produksjon)
- 2017: Ringen (Plassen Produksjon)

With Julian Berntzen

- 2014: Hellemyrsfolket (Songbird)

With Brit Johnsrud

- 2015: Light Blue Outfit (Aslaug Records)

Awards
Preceded by Sigurd Ulveseth	Recipient of the Vossajazzprisen; 1999	Succeeded by Ivar Kolve
