= Ole Marius Sandberg =

Norwegian jazz bassist (born 1975)

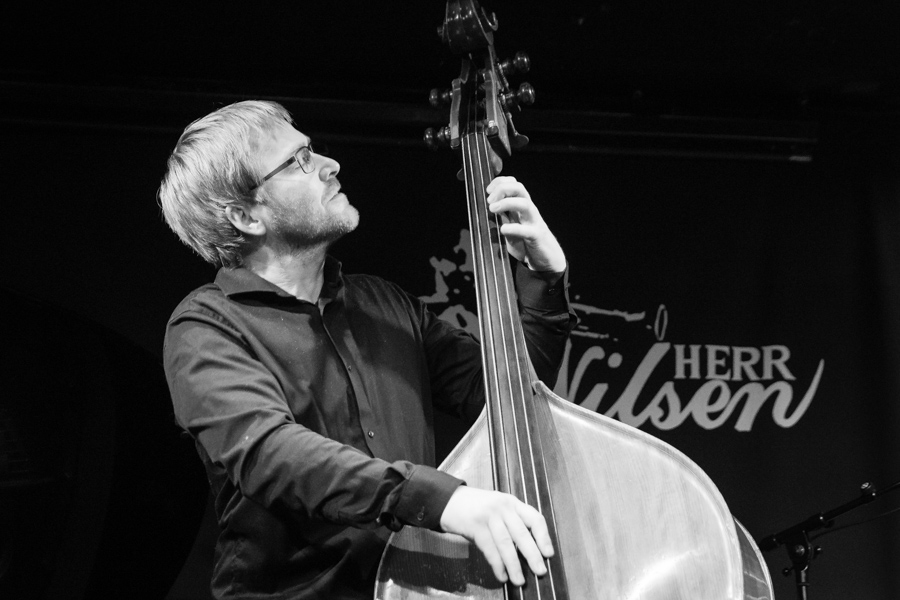
- Ole Marius Sandberg performing in 2019

Background information
- Born: 26 October 1975 (age 50); Storvik, Gildeskål, Norway
- Genres: Jazz
- Occupations: Musician, composer
- Instruments: Double bass, bass guitar
- Labels: Grappa, Universal
- Website: olemarius.com

Ole Marius Sandberg (born 26 October 1975) is a Norwegian jazz bassist who has collaborated with Erlend Skomsvoll, Odd Børretzen, Jan Eggum, Herborg Kråkevik, Christina Bjordal, and Nathalie Nordnes.

== Career ==
Sandberg started his formal musical education on the Music program at «Mosjøen vgs.» (1992–95), attended the Jazz program at «Sund Folkehøgskole» (1995–96), holds a bachler from the Jazz program at Trondheim Musikkonservatorium (1996–1999), and holds a music education degree from Griegakademiet in Bergen (2006–2008). From the time of his studies he joined bands like «Skomsork», «Mandala» and «First Edition» where he collaborated with musicians like Jan Gunnar Hoff and Erlend Skomsvoll.

In recent years, he has been active on both jazz venues and as a freelance musician at both theater on Den Nationale Scene in Bergen, and with artists like Odd Børretzen, Jan Eggum, Herborg Kråkevik, Nathalie Nordnes, Christina Bjordal, Christine Sandtorv, and Helene Bøksle.

== Discography ==
With Christina Bjordal

- 2006: Brighter Days (Universal)
- 2009: Warrior of Light (Universal)

Within Olav Kallhovd Trio

- 2005: Into the dream (Acoustic Records)

Within Mandala

- 2002: Mandala (Acoustic Records)

With Erlend Skomsvoll

- 2006: Variasjoner (Grappa)

Within Skomsork

- 2004: Skomsork (Park Grammofon)

With others

- 2001: Ein løvetann (Gilead), with Sølvi Helen Hopeland
- 2003: Men du syng Irina (Cantando), within Griegakademiets kammerkor
- 2005: Jordbærhagen (Lynor, 2005), with Ingelinn & Hildegunn Reigstad
- 2008: Forståelsen (Privat label), with Otto Henning Kjelstrup
- 2009: Det hev ei rose sprunge (Kulturservice/Universal Music), with Helene Bøksle
- 2009: Stjerneteller (Ifemmera), with Christine Sandtorv
- 2009: Rainbows over river hill (Oslove), within The Rivermen
- 2011: Bohem (Kirkelig Kulturverksted), within Qvales Ensemble
- 2011: Angen av jord (Angen), with Dagfinn Iversen
