= Yngve Moe =

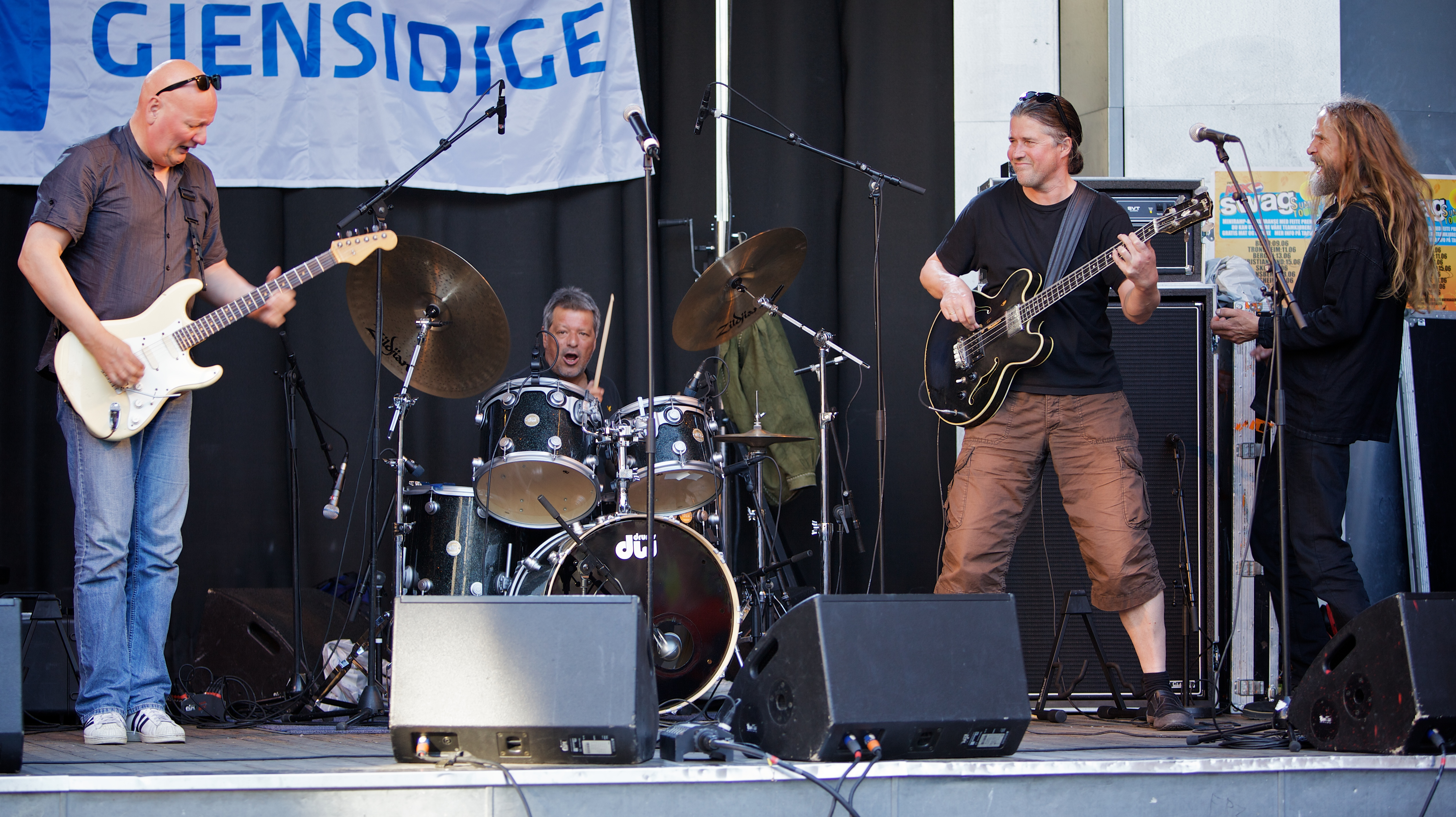
- Moe with Dance with a Stranger in 2009

Background information
- Born: 4 October 1957; Tromsø, Norway
- Died: 17 April 2013 (aged 55) Bergen, Norway
- Genres: Rock
- Occupation: Musician
- Instrument: Bass guitar
- Labels: Norsk Plateproduksjon, Hot Club

Yngve Moe (4 October 1957 – 17 April 2013) was a Norwegian bass guitarist and founding member of the rock band Dance with a Stranger.

== Career ==
He started his career in the band Erter, Kjøtt og Flesk (1971–1975), in his home town of Tromsø. The band broke up in February 1975 after a job in Skien where they were support act for Fairport Convention. During one of the breaks, one of the band members was caught stealing a raw steak, and since Moe was not yet 18 years old, the legal age for prosecution in Norway, he was brought home by his father, ending the band's career. In 1978, Moe moved to Bergen with fellow musicians and friends Bjørn Vassnes and Turid Pedersen, the latter two starting the band Nøkken together with Hans Petter Gundersen. Moe later joined "Nøkken" as a concert musician. During the same time he also played with HP Gundersen's band "Rust". Moe was founding member of the rock band Dance with a Stranger where he played as a bass guitarist up until his death. He also continued working as a studio session musician, participating in projects like Olav Dale's Son Mu, Ernesto Manuitt y Grupo and Groovy.

== Death ==
In April 2013, while vacationing in Tenerife, Spain with his family, Moe was caught by a rip current as he was taking his daily swim at the beach, and was underwater for a period of time. On 6 April it was reported that he was in a chemically induced coma, in critical but stable condition. A few days later he was moved to the hospital in Bergen, where he remained in a coma.

On 17 April 2013 it was announced that Moe died at 15:30 hrs. local time, having never regained consciousness following the drowning accident.

== Awards and honors ==
- Vossajazzprisen 2006

== Discography ==
Within Erter, Kjøtt og Flesk

- 1973 Husmannskost
- 2012 Live i studio! (recorded 1974–75)

Within Rust

- 1983 Rust (EMI, Norway)

Within Son Mu

- 1985 Son Mu (Hot Club)

Within Dance with a Stranger

- 1987 Dance with a Stranger (Norsk Plateproduksjon)
- 1989 To/Fool's Paradise (Norsk/RCA)
- 1991 Atmosphere (Norsk)
- 1994 Look What You've Done (Norsk)
- 1994 Unplugged (Norsk)
- 1995 The Best of Dance with a Stranger (Mercury)
- 1998 Happy Sounds (Mercury)
- 2007 Everyone Needs a Friend... The Very Best of Dance with a Stranger (Mercury)

As sideman

- 1986 Let's Spend the Night Together within the band CCCP
- 1995 Oofotr (Norske Gram) with Oofotr
- 1995 Mia's Song (Sonet), single with Marius Müller
- 1996 Sånn (Nord-Norsk Plateselskap) with Terje Nilsen
- 2003 Hush Hush (EMI Norway) with Nathalie Nordnes
- 2010 Storm with Elg
- 2010 Fram til i dag (EMM) with Erik Moll & Voksne Herrers Orkester

Awards
Preceded by Berit Opheim	Recipient of the Vossajazzprisen; 2006	Succeeded by Snorre Bjerck
