= Geir Rognø =

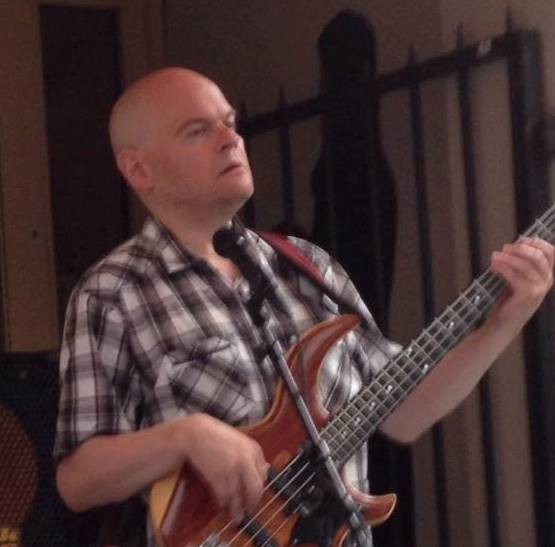

Background information
- Birth name: Geir Aimar Rognø
- Born: 31 March 1963 (age 61); Bergen, Norway
- Genres: Jazz
- Occupation(s): Musician, bassist
- Instrument: Bass

Geir Aimar Rognø (born 31 March 1963 in Bergen, Norway) is a Norwegian musician (bass), known from the band "Hot Cargo" with the Bergen Guitarist Ole Thomsen.

== Career ==
Roognø has played with musicians such as Jan Eggum, Dag Arnesen, Ole Thomsen, Mads Eriksen, Jan Teigen, Thor Endresen, Egil Eldøen, Rune Hauge and Kim Fairchild, and bands like Pål Thowsen Band, "Hot Cargo", "Gruv", "Funkaholics", "Little Big Band" and "Kjersti Misje Band" plus a number of international artists. He is known from numerous TV projects. Rognø started with Jazz fusion in the 1980s in the band Little Big Band. Inspired from The Crusaders and "Spyro Gyro", Dave Grusin and Herbie Hancock, this was a band in the forefront of Norwegian fusion music. He evolved a slap hand technique with inspirations from Stanley Clarke and Larry Graham. In the 80s, he worked as a freelance musician, with many jobs for theater.

== Honors ==
- Håndverkeren which is awarded annually to a musician who performs "music craft" in an exemplary manner, by Scandinavian Entertainment Service

== Discography ==
With T.T. Jug, including with Tormod Kayser, Tord Søfteland and Jon Søfteland Sæbø

- 1982: Ungdommens Radioavis Rockemønstring (Philips), with various artists, "Dusty Freak"

with Ole Thomsen

- 1992: Hot Cargo (NorCD)

with Jan Eggum

- 2001: Ekte Eggum (Grappa)
- 2005: 30/30 (Grappa)
