= Stein Inge Brækhus =

Norwegian jazz drummer and record producer (born 1967)

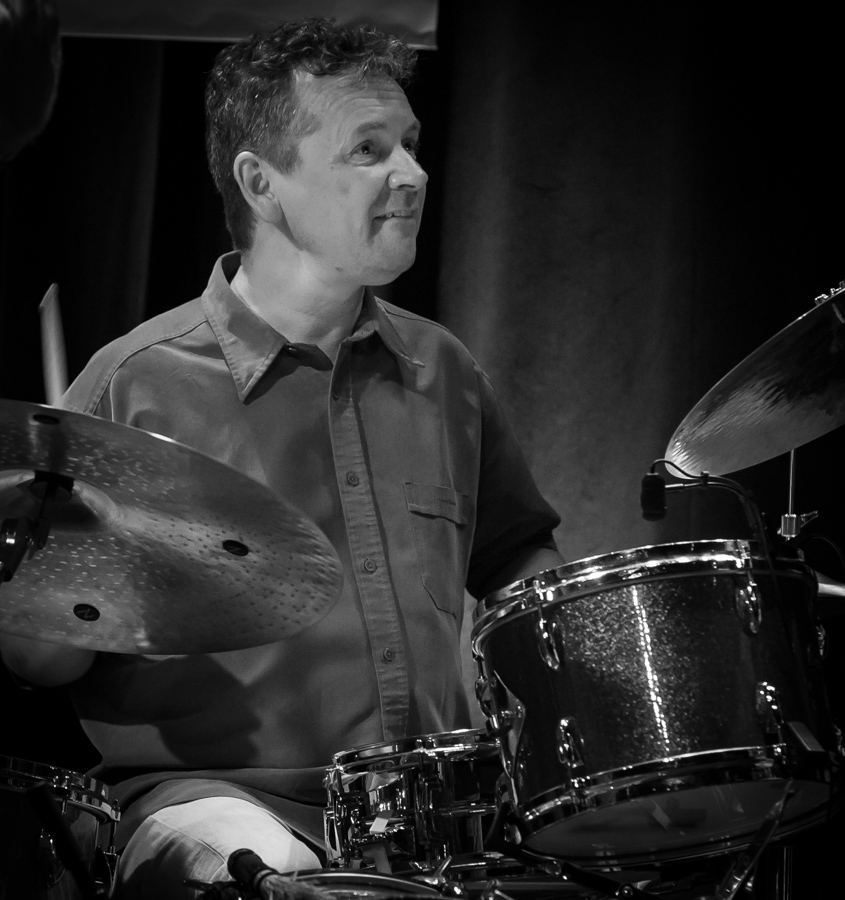
- Brækhus in 2016

Background information
- Born: 12 February 1967 (age 59); Trondheim, Sør-Trøndelag
- Origin: Norway
- Genres: Jazz
- Occupations: Musician, composer, drummer
- Instrument: Drums

Stein Inge Brækhus (born 12 February 1967) is a Norwegian jazz musician (drums) and record producer, known from a series of album releases and as a key musician at the Jazz scenes of Stavanger and Bergen.

== Career ==
Brækhus was born in Trondheim. He grew up and lives in Os close to Bergen, where he was recognised as a promising drummer at an early age, in bands like "Creation" (1982–84), "Chippie" (1982–84), debuted at Molde Festival 1984 with Oslo band "Celeste", together with the well known jazz musicians Bendik Hofseth and Øystein Sevåg, and was known throughout Norway as a member of the successful band Cutting Edge (1984–86) from Oslo, and the bands Night & Day, Hot Cargo, Knut Kristiansen, Daniel Amaro, Bergen Big Band, Dabrhahi, Jan Ove Nordeide in Bergen, og Silje Nergaard's "Mellow Yellow" and Olga Konkova Trio in Oslo, in Sweden with the band "barT" along with the American pianist Jim Beard, and otherwise with Nils Petter Molvær, Jan Bang, "Trio de Janeiro". He has also contributed in bands and on releases with Åge Aleksandersen, Bjørn Eidsvåg, Jan Eggum, Karoline Krüger, Secret Mission, Vamp (Månemannen), "Elle Melle", "The Norwegian Fords", Ole Thomsen, Astrid Kloster's release SPOR with Kenneth Siversten's compositions, Knut Kristiansen, Karl Seglem/Håkon Høgemo, Ole Jacob Hystad Quartet, Ivar Kolve, Kenneth Sivertsen, Ole Amund Gjersvik, Lars Erik Drevvatne, Tone Lise Moberg, Phil McDermott, Tor Yttredal, Helene Bøksle, Tazano, Paolo Fresu and SUBTRIO with baritone saxophonist John Pål Inderberg.

Brækhus has had production work and was much engaged TV 2 the first years after they started. He has run his own mobile recording studio "Breakhouse Studio" from (1997–). Brækhus are working permanently and teaches at the Institute for Music & Dance (IMD) University of Stavanger.

== Honors ==
- 2001: Vossajazzprisen
- 2002: Gammleng-prisen in the class Studio musician
- 2013: Mølsterprisen

== Discography (in selection) ==
- 1986: Duesenberg (Curling Legs), within "Cutting Edge»
- 1992: Nattjazz 20 År (Grappa Music), within "Night and Day" (Linda Farestveit, Knut Kristiansen & Per Jørgensen)
- 1992: Hot Cargo (NorCD), within "Hot Cargo" the band of guitarist Ole Thomsen
- 1992: Utla (NorCD), with Håkon Høgemo/Karl Seglem
- 1993: Rit (NorCD), with Karl Seglem
- 1993: Dacapo (Grappa Music), with Jan Eggum
- 1997: Touch of time (Gemini Records), within "Ole Jacob Hystad Quartet»
- 1998: Ope (NorCD), within Ivar Kolve Trio
- 1998: One day in October (Nimis), with Kenneth Sivertsen
- 1998: History & Movement (Da-Da) with Didrik Ingvaldsen
- 1998: Milonga Triste (Acoustic Records), with Ole Amund Gjersvik
- 2000: En Annen Sol (Majorforlaget), with Vamp
- 2001: Keys on and Off (Acoustic Music), with Lars Erik Drevvatne
- 2002: Nye nord (NorCD), with Karl Seglem
- 2004: Innover (Curling Legs ), within Ivar Kolve Trio
- 2004: Live at Sting (Dravle Records), within "Subtrio" feat. Paolo Fresu
- 2005: Seagull (Grappa Music), within Bergen Big Band feat. Karin Krog (2005)
- 2005: Blues for Ell (Dravle Records), within "Knut Kristiansen Trio»
- 2006: Loking On (NorCD), with Tone Lise Moberg
- 2007: Dabrhahi (NorCD), with Olav Dale
- 2008: Som den gyldne sol frembryter (Grappa Music), within "Bergen Big Band»
- 2009: St. Fin Barre's (Leo Records), in trio with guitarist Mark O'Leary and organist Ståle Storløkken
- 2009: Horneland (NorCD), with Line Horneland
- 2010: Now (AnJazz), within Phil McDermott Quintet
- 2013: 'TAZANO (Inner X), with Anania Ngoliga, Tor Yttredal, John Mponda and Jørn Øien
- 2013: CIRRUS Méli Mélo (NorCD), with Eva Kirstine Bjerga Haugen, Inge Weatherhead Breistein and Theodor Barsnes Onarheim

Awards
Preceded by Ivar Kolve	Recipient of the Vossajazzprisen; 2001	Succeeded by Thomas T. Dahl
