= MajorStudio =

MajorStudio AS is a Norwegian record company and music publisher who own MajorSelskapet and MajorForlaget. The company is based in Bøverbru.

The company started as TUMA Holding in 1988, but changed its name to MajorStudio in 1990 when they bought a studio in Majorstuen. At the same time, Jan Paulsen took over as head, where he remains today. Together with Øyvind Staveland, Paulsen runs the company. The other two members of Vamp and Rita Eriksen have lesser ownership roles.

The studio was sold in 1999, and the company moved to a record company and music publisher. Their music is distributed through Musikkoperatørene and Diskos Distribusjon AS.

The company specialises in Norwegian language, acoustic music, and represents, among others, Vamp, Eriksen and Maj Britt Andersen.
