= Ivar Kolve =

Norwegian jazz musician

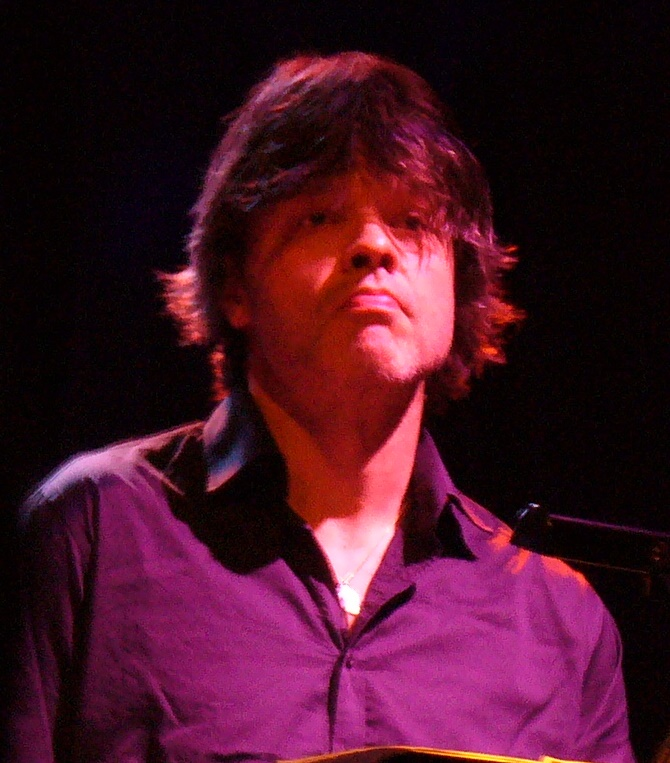
- Vossajazz 2014.

Background information
- Born: March 31, 1967 (age 59); Voss Municipality, Hordaland
- Origin: Norway
- Genres: Jazz
- Occupations: Musician, composer
- Instruments: Vibraphone, marimba, percussion
- Website: www.ivarkolve.com

Ivar Kolve (born 31 March 1967) is a Norwegian jazz musician (xylophone, vibraphone, marimba and percussion), the younger brother of the saxophonist Kåre Kolve, and known from several album releases as soloartist and for collaborations with Maria Joao, Jan Gunnar Hoff, Ståle Storløkken, Mathias Eick, Eivind Aarset and Bjørn Kjellemyr among others.

== Career ==
Kolve was born in Voss but since 1988 has lived in Bergen, where he was educated at the Bergen Musikkonservatorium. With his own Trio Ivar Kolve Trio (established in 1996) Sébastien Dubé (bass) and Stein Inge Brækhus (drums), he has released a number of albums.

Kolve is part of the band «Spindel» led by Liv Merete Kroken and Sigrid Moldestad (Spindel 2001 and Aminje 2005). He has also participated in a number of projects like with the Voss Children's Choir «Småkvedarne» (Småkvedarne, NorCD), and with Jan Gunnar Hoff Free flow songs, commissioned work for Vossajazz in 2005.

At Vossajazz 2014, he appeared with an Polyostinat experience. Here he performed with a team of Norwegian musicians, Kåre Kolve, Jørn Øien, Ellen Andrea Wang and Jarle Vespestad. They delivered an indulgent poly rhythmic and poly harmonic treat for the discerning ear.

== Honors ==
- 2000: Vossajazzprisen

== Discography ==
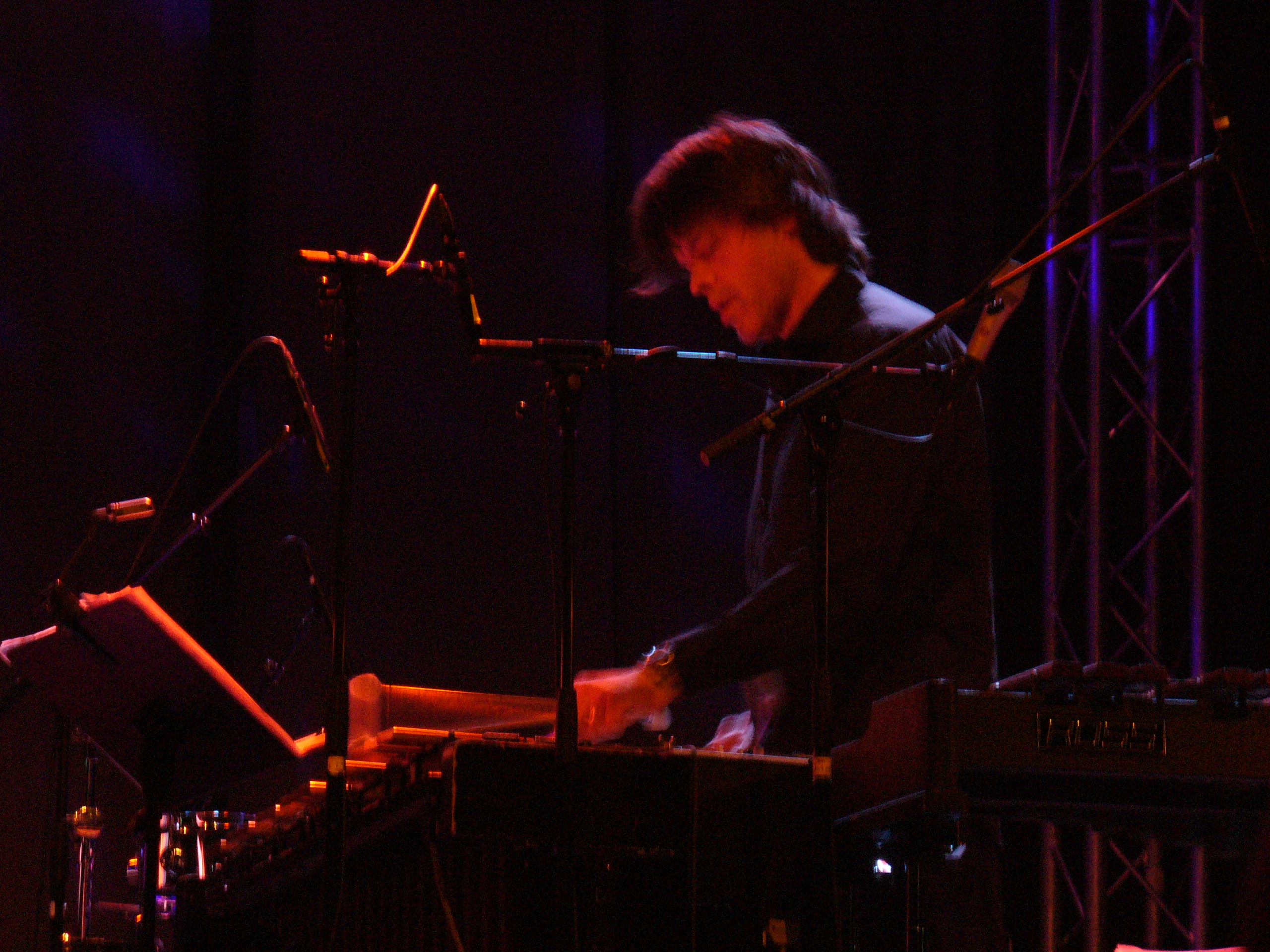
Kolve at Vossajazz April 13, 2014.

Solo albums

- 1998: Ope (NorCD)
- 2005: Innover (Curling Legs)
- 2008: View From My Room (Curling Legs)

With «Spindel»

- 2001: Spindel (Heilo/Grappa)
- 2005: Aminje (Heilo/Grappa)

With Trond-Viggo Torgersen

- 2005: Barnetimen For De Store (EMI)

With Terje Rypdal

- 2005: Lux Aeterna (ECM)

With Bergen Big Band, feat. Karin Krog, directed by John Surman

- 2005: Seagull (Grappa)

With Lothe

- 2012: Blå Song (Grammofon)

With Karin Krog & John Surman

- 2013: Songs About This And That (Meantime), including with Bjørn Klakegg, Terje Gewelt & Tom Olstad

Awards
Preceded by Helge Lilletvedt	Recipient of the Vossajazzprisen; 2000	Succeeded by Stein Inge Brækhus
