= Vossajazz =

Annual jazz festival in Voss, Norway

Voss International Jazz Festival Vossajazz
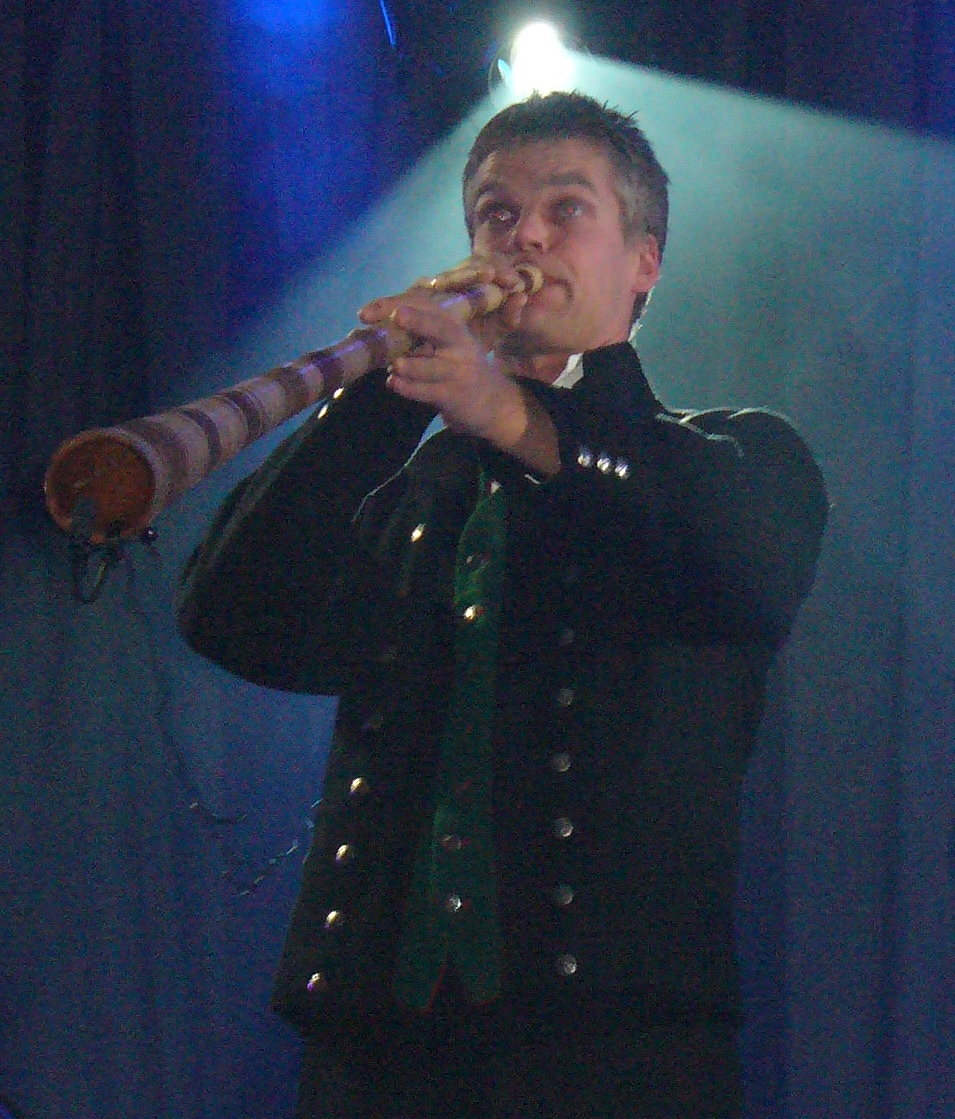
- Opening ceremony at Vossajazz 2014.
- Status: Active
- Genre: Jazz Festival
- Date: March – April
- Begins: 12 April 2019
- Ends: 14 April 2019
- Frequency: Annually
- Locations: Vossavangen, Voss Municipality
- Country: Norway
- Years active: 1974 – present
- Inaugurated: Founded 1973
- Founder: Lars Mossefinn
- Website: vossajazz.no

Vossajazz or Vossa Jazz (established 19 December 1973) is an international jazz festival in Vossavangen in Voss Municipality, Norway, which takes place annually during the week before Easter, and which also includes concerts throughout the year. The festival has been led by Trude Storheim since August 2007.

== History ==
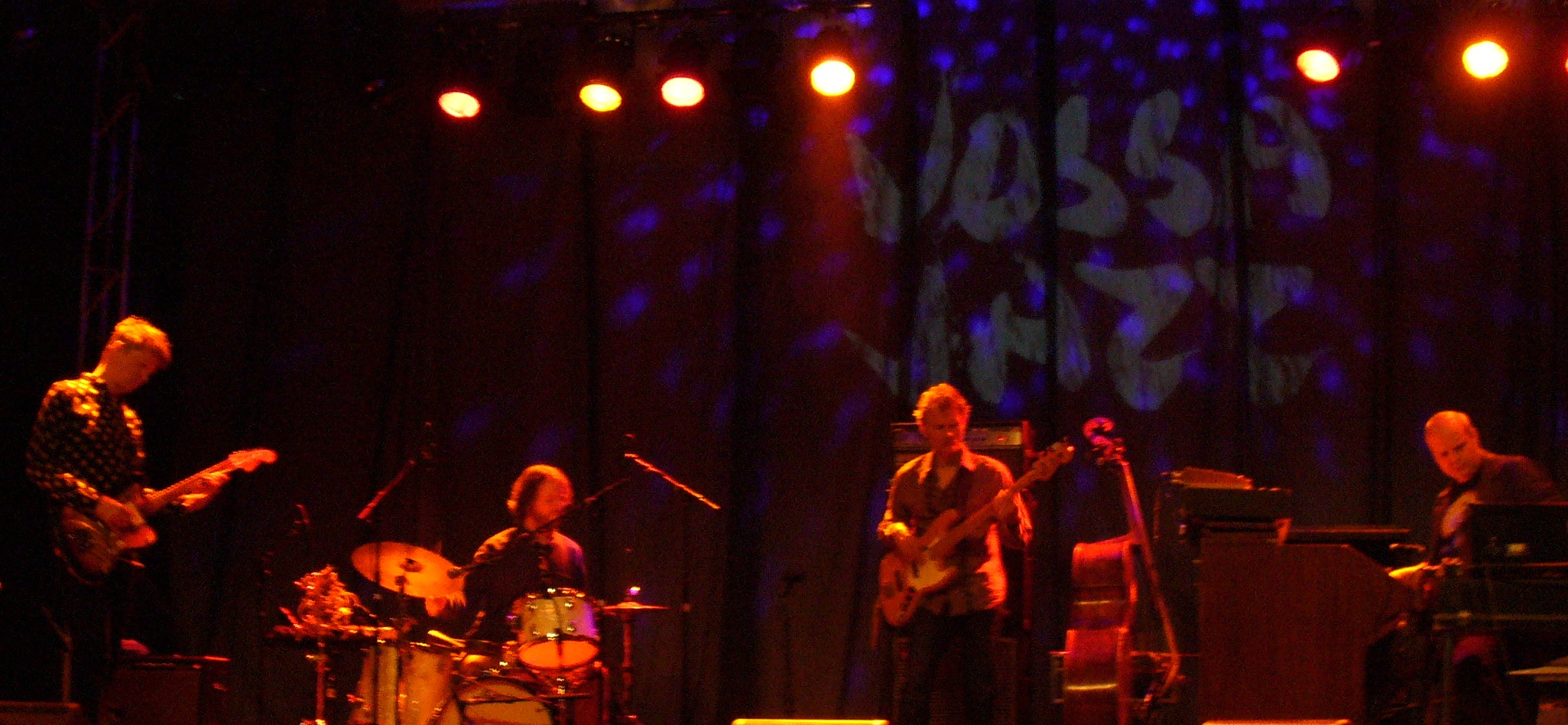
Medeski, Martin and Wood + Nels Cline at Vossajazz 2014.

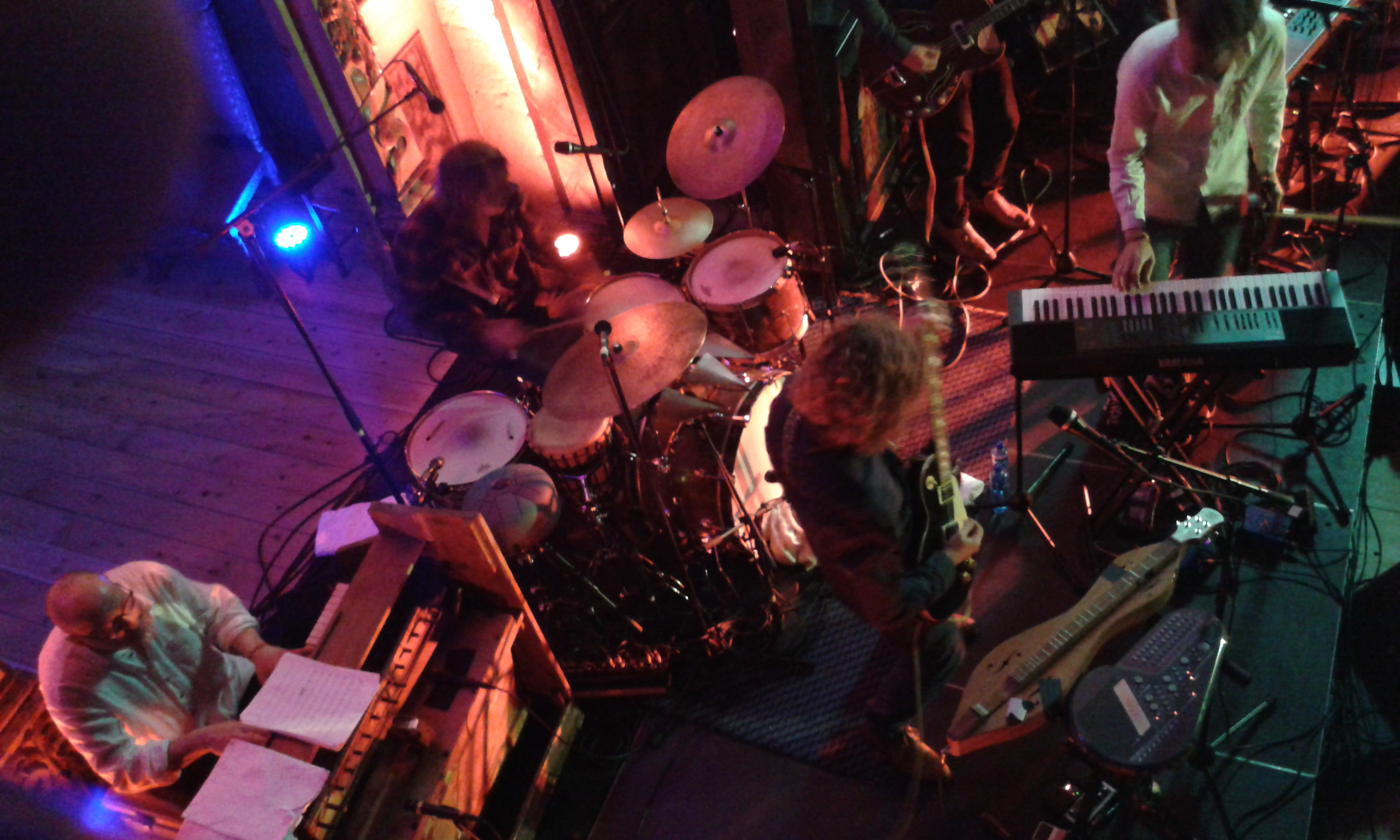
Sigbjørn Apeland and the Real Ones at Vossajazz 2015.

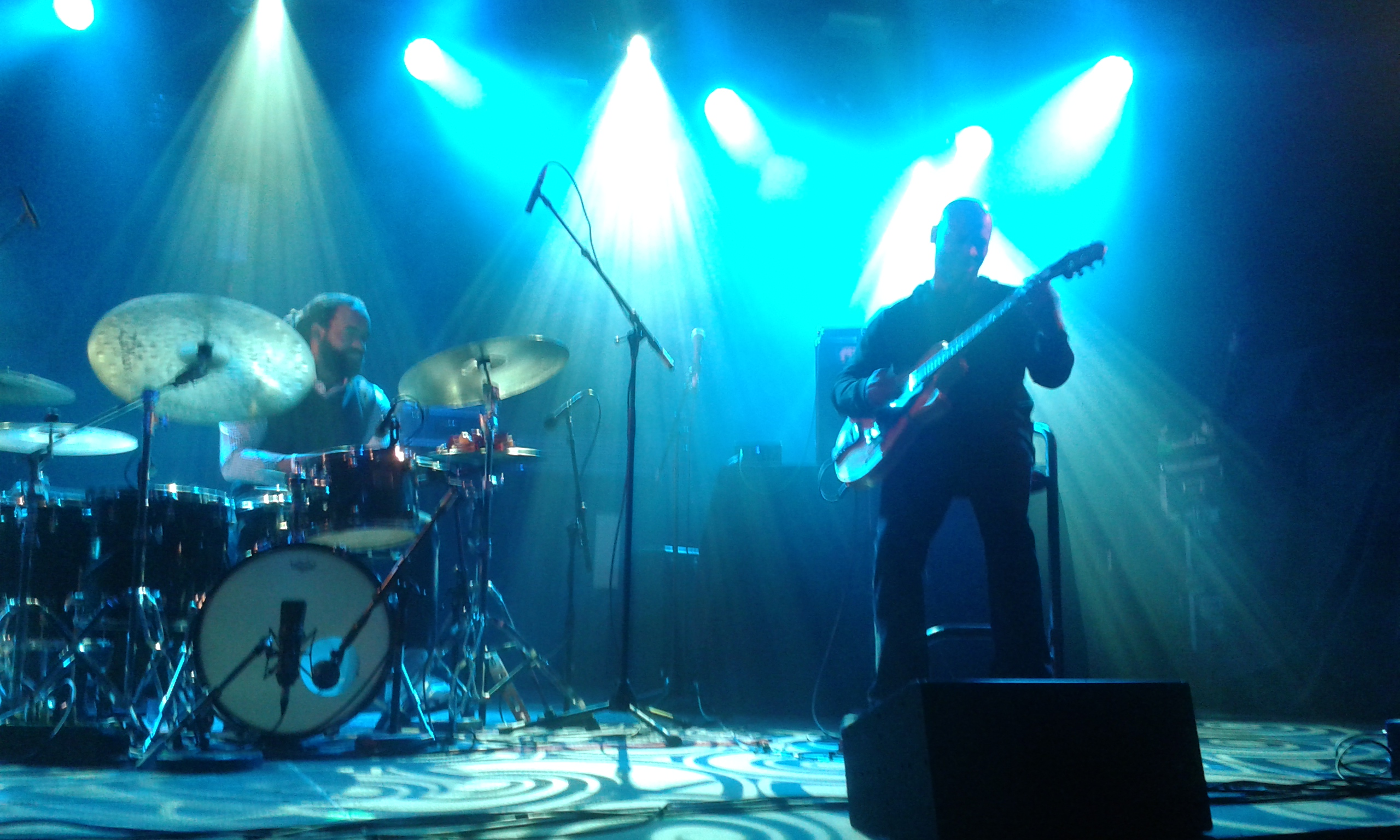
Kevin Eubanks and Obed Calvaire with Dave Holland Trio at Vossajazz 2016.

The first festival in 1974 was held the same weekend as the World Cup in Alpine skiing at Voss. The idea was that ski and jazz fit together. Since 1986 the festival has always taken place during the palm weekend. From 2007, the festival director has been Trude Storheim.

In 1980 Vossajazz brought Rune Gustafsson and Niels-Henning Ørsted Pedersen together for a power session in the old Voss cinema. This cooperation led to the album Just The Way You Are (1980). Vossajazz includes jazz, folk and ethnic music. There is also Badnajazz for the children, Ekstremjazz (not part of Ekstremsportveko, the extreme sports week also held in Voss), Eldrejazz and UNGjaJAZZja!. In addition, the festival annually commissions a piece of music from Norwegian composers.

The 2016 edition of Vossajazz was a musical event with a blend of different impressions. The Down Beat report gives the festival splendid reviews and opens with stating: "A warm bath of synchronicity hit the lakeside town of Voss, Norway, in the heart of the 43rd annual Vossa Jazz Festival. The blissful sense of convergence of elements came courtesy of respected and increasingly international Hardanger fiddle master Nils Okland, during his contribution to the long history of the festival’s keynote commissioned work (or “Tingingsverket”)."

== Commissioned works ==
- 1978: Dag Arnesen
- 1983: Egil Kapstad – Epilog
- 1985: Bjørn Alterhaug – Fantasier for et miljø
- 1987: Dag Arnesen – Strøtanker og røde roser
- 1988: Ole Thomsen – Usynlige danser
- 1989: Tore Brunborg – Tid
- 1990: Arild Andersen – Sagn
- 1991: Bendik Hofseth – Q
- 1992: Magnetic North Orchestra – Il Cenone
- 1993: Bugge Wesseltoft – A little war story
- 1994: Mari Boine – Leahkastin
- 1995: Veslefrekk – Nils, Per & Veslefrekk
- 1996: Nils Petter Molvær – Labyrinter
- 1997: Frode Alnæs – Til Voss
- 1998: Misha Alperin – Night
- 1999: Vigleik Storaas – Mosaikk
- 2000: Ketil Bjørnstad – Grace
- 2001: Eldbjørg Raknes – So much depends upon a red wheel barrow
- 2002: Erlend Skomsvoll – Variasjoner
- 2003: Terje Rypdal – Vossabrygg
- 2004: Svein Folkvord – Across
- 2005: Jan Gunnar Hoff – Free flow songs
- 2006: Trygve Seim – Reiser
- 2007: Berit Opheim – Ein engel går stilt
- 2008: Tord Gustavsen – Restar av kukke – bitar av tru
- 2009: Solveig Slettahjell – Tarpan Seasons
- 2010: Karin Krog and John Surman – Songs about this and that
- 2011: Mathias Eick – Voss
- 2012: Karl Seglem – Som spor
- 2013: Stian Carstensen – Flipp
- 2014: Mats Eilertsen – Rubicon
- 2015: Live Maria Roggen – Apokaluptein – The Uncovering
- 2016: Nils Økland – Glødetrådar
- 2017: Susanna & the Brotherhood of our Lady.
- 2018: Eirik Hegdal – Musical Balloon

== Vossajazzprisen ==
Since 1988 the festival has honoured prominent freelance jazz musicians from Hordaland with an award, including:

- 1988: Olav Dale, Voss
- 1989: Ole Thomsen, Bergen
- 1990: Knut Kristiansen, Bergen
- 1991: Per Jørgensen, Bergen
- 1992: Dag Arnesen, Bergen
- 1993: Ole Hamre, Bergen
- 1994: Gabriel Fliflet, Bergen
- 1995: Harald Dahlstrøm, Bergen
- 1996: Terje Isungset, Bergen
- 1997: Frank Jakobsen, Bergen
- 1998: Sigurd Ulveseth, Bergen
- 1999: Helge Lilletvedt, Bergen
- 2000: Ivar Kolve, Voss
- 2001: Stein Inge Brækhus, Bergen
- 2002: Thomas T. Dahl, Bergen
- 2003: Kåre Opheim, Voss
- 2004: Magne Thormodsæter, Bergen
- 2005: Berit Opheim, Voss
- 2006: Yngve Moe, Sotra
- 2007: Snorre Bjerck, Florø
- 2008: Mads Berven, Bergen
- 2009: Kjetil Møster, Bergen
- 2010: Stein Urheim, Bergen
- 2011: Mari Kvien Brunvoll, Molde
- 2012: Sigrid Moldestad, Breim in Gloppen
- 2013: Tore Brunborg
- 2014: Sigbjørn Apeland, Sveio
- 2015: Thea Hjelmeland, Sunnfjord
- 2016: Øyvind Skarbø, Stranda in Sunnmøre
- 2017: Hans Petter Gundersen, Bergen
- 2018: Benedicte Maurseth, Eidfjord

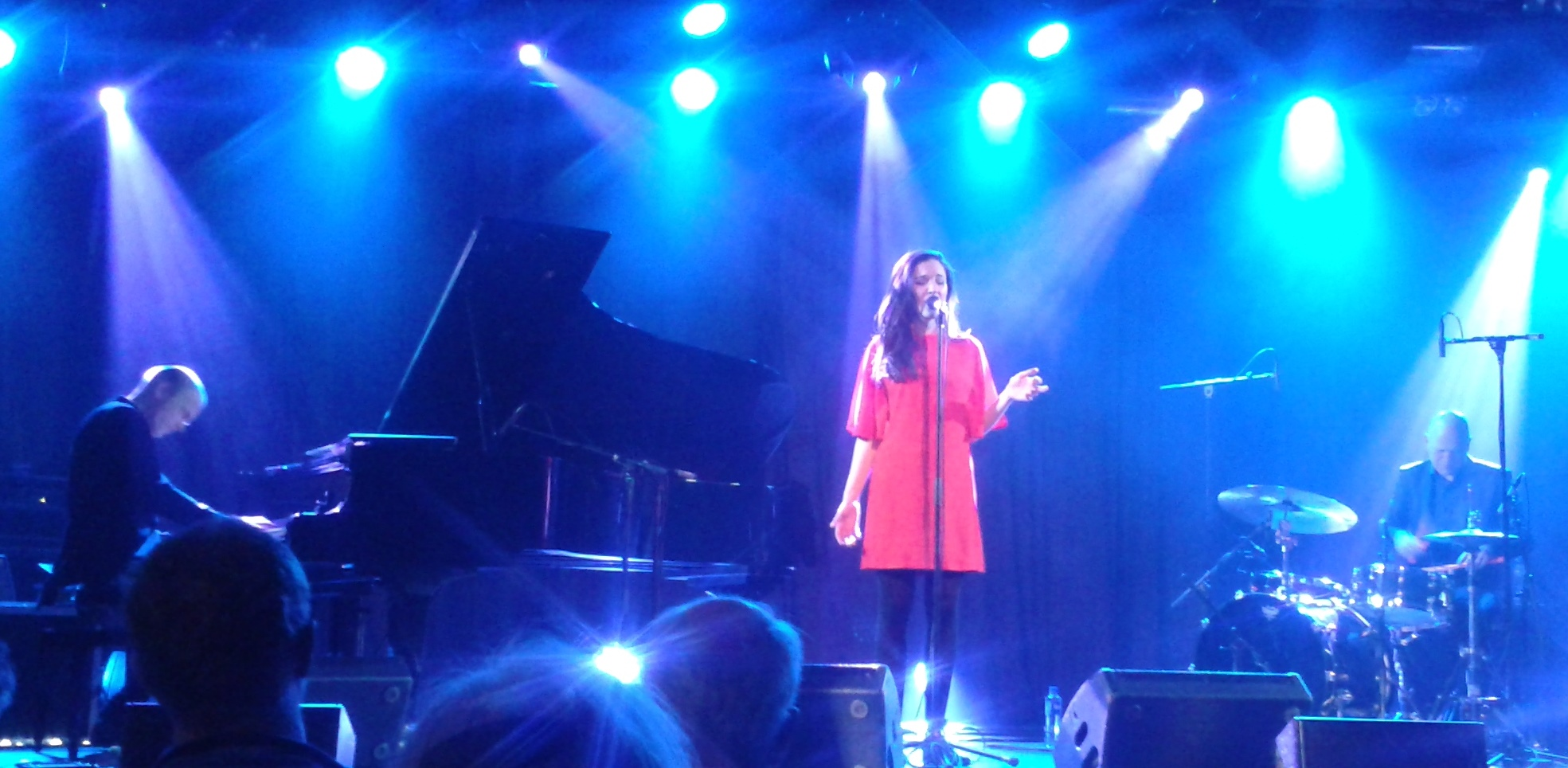
Tord Gustavsen, Simin Tander and Jarle Vespestad at Vossajazz 2016.

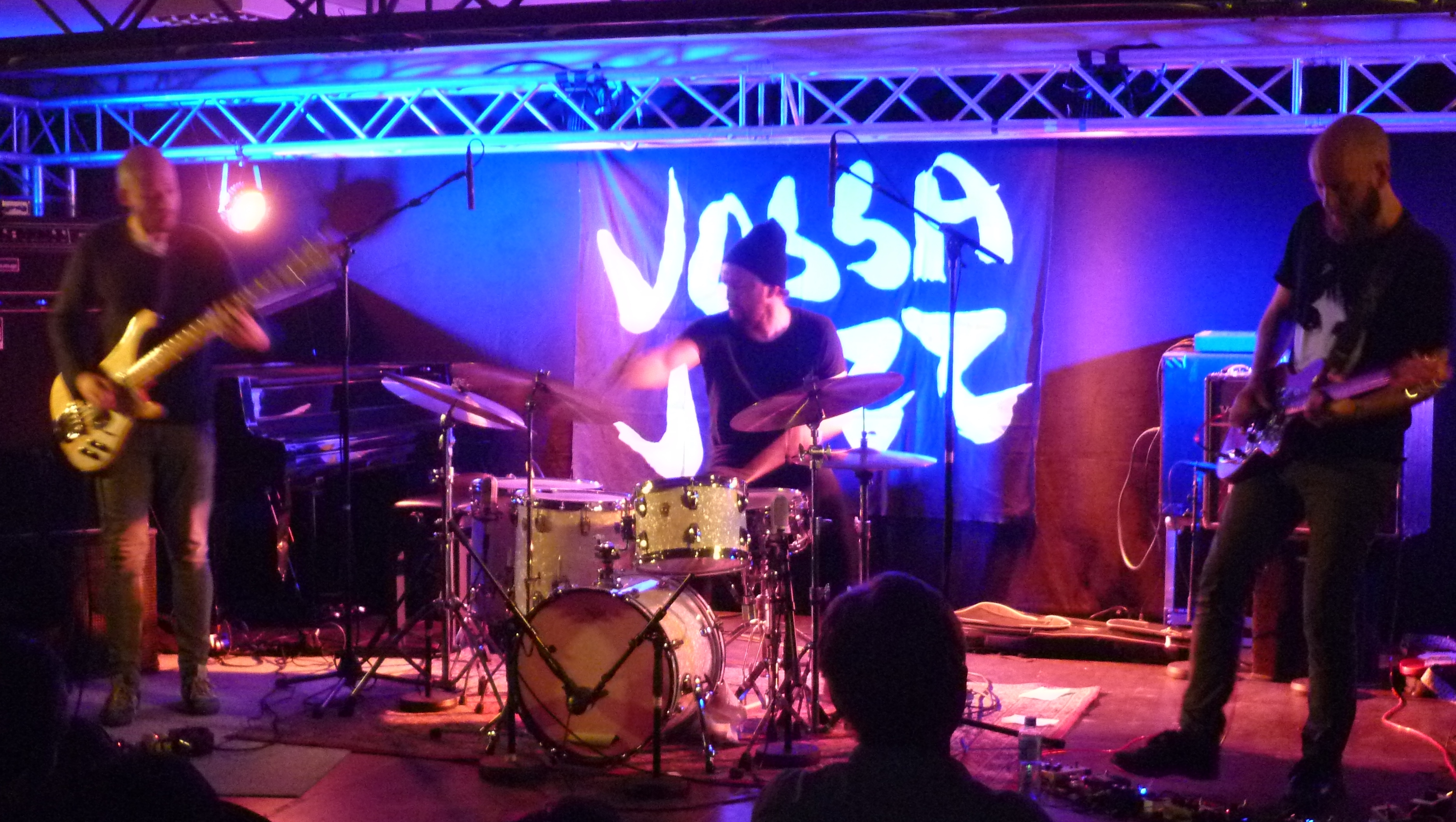
Bushman's Revenge at Vossajazz 2017.

== Vossajazz Records ==
Several recordings made at the festival have been issued on Vossajazz's own label, Vossa Jazz Records.

- 1996: Fliflet/Hamre Energiforsyning: Moro post mortem, live (VJ 18962)
- 1998: Berit Opheim, Bjørn Kjellemyr, Einar Mjølsnes, Sigbjørn Apeland and Per Jørgensen: Fryd (VJ 980042)
- 2001: Kari Bremnes and Lars Klevstrand: Tid Å Hausta Inn (VJ 980052)
- 2003: Tore Brunborg: Gravity (VJ 03006-2)
- 2004: Electro Ompaniet: Toskedalen (VJ 04007-2)
- 2004: Svein Folkvord: Across (VJ 04008)
- 2005: Electro Ompaniet: Electromecanibalism (VJ 04007-3)
- 2006: Terje Isungset and Didier Petit: Live at Vossajazz (VJ 060112)
- 2006: Sonic Stories with Kari Nergaard Bleivik and Rune Mandelid: Feels like night (VJ 060102)
- 2006: Sub Trio with John Pål Inderberg, Stein Inge Brækhus and Svein Folkvord: Subtrio (VJ 060122)
- 2010: Badnajazz 10 year anniversary album: Eg È Liten Eg, Men Eg Vaoga Meg(VJ100132)
