= Gustavo Bergalli =

Argentine jazz trumpeter and bandleader

Gustavo Bergalli (born December 14, 1940, in Buenos Aires) is an Argentine jazz trumpeter and bandleader.

== Discography ==
- Crossworlds (CD, Album), Igloo 2001
- Hot Salsa (LP, Album), Montezuma Records 1976
- Solfeggietto (LP, Album), Mariann Grammofon AB 1978
- Hård Kärlek (LP) Leva Mig Ett Liv Polar Music International AB 1981
- Polyglot (LP, Album) Caprice Records 1983
- Himlen Runt Hörnet (LP, Album) Ändå Faller Regnet Diesel Music 1992
- The Complete Studio Recordings (9xCD, Album + 2xDVD-V + Box) Polar Music International AB 2005
- Quinteplus (CD) Vampi Soul 2007
- Sweet Surprise (LP, Album, RE) Celeste 2007
- Jazz Unit featuring Maucha Adnet & Gustavo Bergalli, Pama Records (7331510103213)
