= Knut Kristiansen =

Norwegian composer and jazz pianist

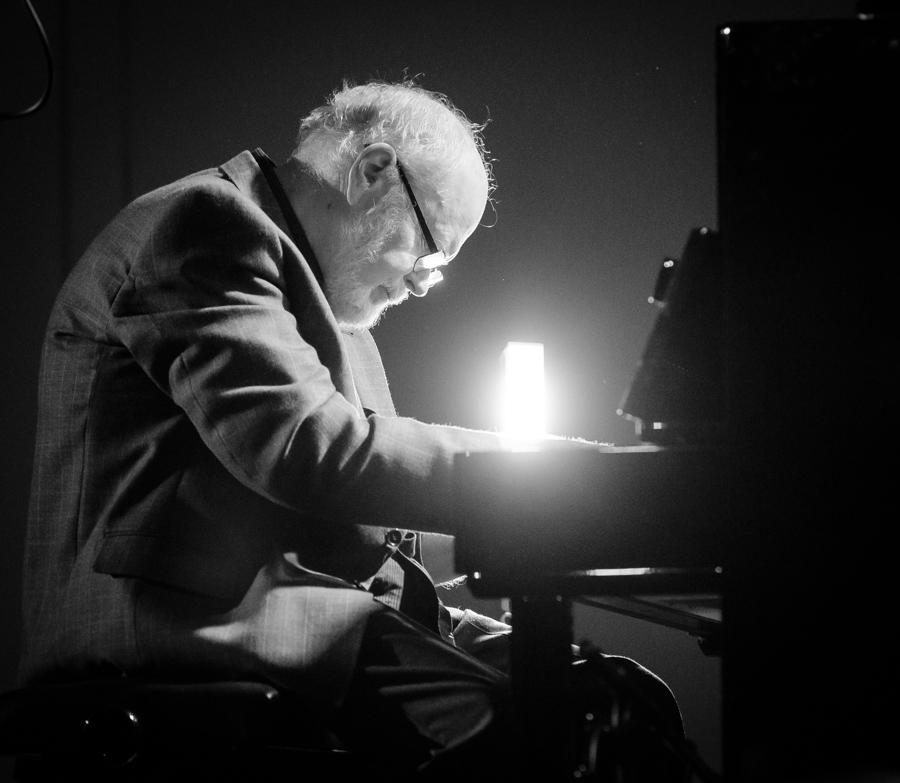

Background information
- Born: Knut Johan Bratland Kristiansen; 14 April 1946 (age 80); Bergen, Norway
- Genres: Jazz
- Occupations: Musician, composer
- Instrument: Piano
- Label: Odin Records

Knut Johan Bratland Kristiansen (born 14 April 1946) is a Norwegian composer and jazz musician (piano), known from Bergen jazz life primarily for his many interpretations of the music of Thelonious Monk as orchestra leader his own bands with various number of musicians involved.

== Career ==
In his native town of Bergen, Kristiansen played with Mette Rongved (vocals), Sture Janson (bass), established several jazz orchestras (including "Bergen Big Band"), made compositions for plays at the theater Den Nationale Scene, held a variety of courses and seminars, and got the Bergen County Council Cultural Prize in 1978.

In 1983, he received the Buddy Award for contributions to world music by "The Gambian/Norwegian Friendship Orchestra" (release, 1982), the Latin jazz band "Son Mu" (1981) who released the album Son Mu (1985) and the band "Night and Day" (1986). At the same time, he was central contributor to Vossajazz, with the commissioned work to Bergen Big Band Kuria suite.

Kristiansen led the "Monk Memorial" series on the Kongsberg Jazz Festival (1987) og Nattjazz (1989), and led a Big Band on the album Monk Moods. He performed the show "A tribute to Monk" at the Oslo Jazz Festival 1997. In 2005 he released the album Blues For Ell with his own Knut Kristiansen Trio, and in 2016 the album Kuria Suite was released.

== Honors ==
- Buddyprisen 1983 for contributions to World music
- Vossajazzprisen 1990

== Discography ==
- 1983: Friendship with the Gambian Norwegian Friendship Orchestra (Odin Records) commissioned work to the Bergen Jazz Forum's tenth anniversary in 1982.
- 1995: Monk moods (Odin Records)
- 2004: Blues For Ell (Dravle Records)
- 2016: Kuria Suite (Grappa Music), with Bergen Big Band

Awards
Preceded by Radka Toneff	Recipient of the Buddyprisen; 1983	Succeeded by Jon Balke
Preceded by Ole Thomsen	Recipient of the Vossajazzprisen; 1990	Succeeded by Per Jørgensen
