= Ole Amund Gjersvik =

Norwegian jazz musician and composer

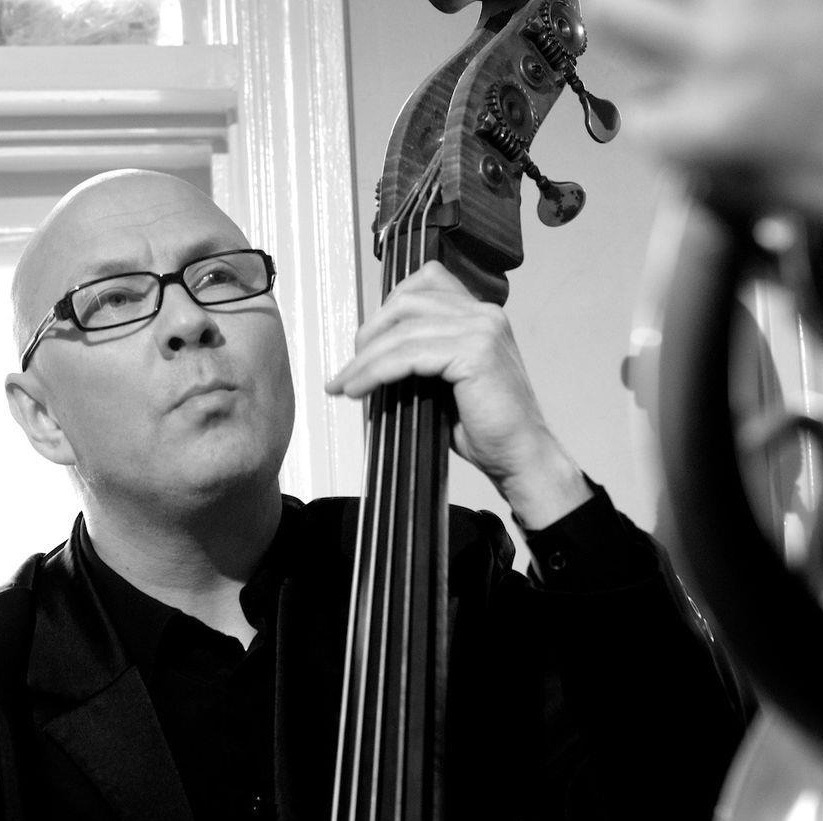
- Gjersvik in 2013

Background information
- Born: 10 December 1963 (age 62); Bergen, Norway
- Genres: Jazz
- Occupations: Musician, composer
- Instrument: Upright bass
- Website: www.usf.no/no/program/2014/01/kortreist-jazz-ole-amund-gjersvik-med-band

Ole Amund Gjersvik (born 10 December 1963) is a Norwegian Jazz musician (upright bass) and composer, central on the Bergen jazz scene and known from a number of record releases.

== Career ==
Gjersvik was born in Bergen, Norway, where he studied at the Grieg Academy and Bergen Conservatory of Music, where he has also taught. As a performing musician, he has led his own trios, quartets and quintets as well as tango orchestra Combo Tango. Gjersvik is very versatile and has played with musicians like Kaizers Orchestra, Ketil Bjørnstad, Ole Thomsen, Kåre Thomsen, Ole Paus, Jan Eggum, Herborg Kråkevik and Sissel Kyrkjebø. He has also been widely used in theater and television connection, and has participated on many albums. Under his own name, he has published A Voice from the Past (1990) and Milonga Triste (1998) among others, and Combo Tango Plays Music by Ole Amund Gjersvik (2002). He has received numerous awards and honors, including Rolf Gammleng Award in 2000. In 1990 he founded his own label, Acoustic Records.

== Honors ==
- 2000: Gammleng Award

== Discography ==
=== Albums ===
- Poems for Trio (1988), with Karl Seglem and Kåre Thomsen
- A Voice from the Past (1990)
- Appasionata Criminelle (1992)
- Alone in the Crowd (1993)
- Around the Fountain (1995)
- Milonga Triste (1998)
- Circus (2006)
- Dialoger (2011), with Tore Thorsen
- Live in Bergen (2011)
- Bass Improvisations (2011)
- Free Approach (2011), with Nils Are Drønen and Stein Urheim
- Tranquility (2011), with Tore Thorsen
- Duo Improvisations (2011), with Marius Neset
- Bass Improvisations Volume 2 (2013)
- Latin Collection (2013)
- Bergen (2013), with Tore Thorsen
- Bass Improvisations Volume 3 (2013)
- Conversations With Myself (2013)
- All Together Now (2014)
- Bass Improvisations Volume 4 (2014)
- Bass Improvisations Volume 5 (2015)
- Bass and Voice Improvisations (2015)
- Over skyene (2015), with Jan-Ove Hansen
- Ballads (2015)
- Into the Beast (2016), with Marita Moe Sandven
- Bass Improvisations Volume 6 (2016)
- Prelude to a Prelude (2016) with Ugo Santangelo
- Free Impro (2016)
- Twelve Tracks Of Our Ghosts To Come ( 2017 ), Into The Beast, with Marita Moe Sandven
- Bass Improvisations Volume 7 (2017)
- Crossing Borders (2017) with Heine Bugge
- GSN (2018) with Arild Thomas Seim & Helge Nyheim
- Inside My Head (2018)
- Bass Improvisations Volume 8 (2018)
- Bass Alone (2018)
- Live In Paradis med Ole Amund Gjersvik Trio (2018)
- Live In Norheimsund med Ole Amund Gjersvik Trio (2018)
- Live At Fana Jazz Club med Ole Amund Gjersvik Trio (2018)
- Live In Jølster med Ole Amund Gjersvik Quartet (2018)
- Headless Bodies Homeless Hearts ( 2019 ), Into The Beast, with Marita Moe Sandven
- Down The Blues Lane - Alone (2019)
- Goodbye med Tore Hegdahl (2019)
- Folksongs (2019)
- Moments (2019)
- Twisted Walk (2019)
- Feelin' Blue (2019)
- Live At Kabuso med Ole Amund Gjersvik Trio (2020)
- Live Spring med Tore Hegdahl (2020)
- Live At Swing'n'Sweet med Ole Amund Gjersvik Trio (2020)
- Live Autumn med Tore Hegdahl (2020)
- The Tinkerbell Spell ( 2020 ), Into The Beast with Marita Moe Sandven
- Winter Live med Tore Hegdahl (2020)
- Bass Improvisations Volume 9 (2020)
- Alternative Suite (2020)
- Bass Improvisations Volume 10 (2020)
- My Old Flame med Tore Hegdahl (2021)
- Dark Sacred Night med Tore Hegdahl (2021)
- Remembering Charlie Haden (2022)
- Playing (2022)
- Bass Meditations (2022)
- Blue Note med Kristian Wedberg (2022)
- Veien Videre med Arild B. Nielsen (2022)
- Morning Dew (2022)
- Human Heart ( 2022 ), Into The Beast with Marita Moe Sandven
- New Beginning (2023)

==== Trang Fødsel ====
- Bare barnet (1995)
- Hybel (1997)
- Feber (1998)
- Damp (1999)
- De aller beste (2005)
- Hammock (2007)

=== Singles ===
- Kursiv (1997)
- Hippie (1997)
- Livet det er helt ålreit (1997)
- James Bond (1997)
- Midt i trynet (1997)
- Manisk (1998)
- Bing bang (1998)
- Drømmedame (1998)
- Hele veien hjem (1999)
- Ligg unna (1999)
- Det kimer i klokker og klirrer i glass (2003)
- Fredag (2005)
- Ikke meg (2007)

==== Karl Seglem ====
- Sogn-A-Song (1991)
- Rit (1994)
- New North (2004)

==== Design by Sound ====
- Design by Sound (1999)

==== Combo Tango ====
- Combo Tango (2002)
- Milonga Del Angel (2007)

==== Vise Menn ====
- Forbud mot å fly (2004)

==== Cooly Horn ====
- Cooly Horn (2004)

==== Vindrosa ====
- Østenfor sol (2010)
- Bakom berget det blå (2013)

==== Contributes on ====
- Ivar Medaas & Ove Thue: Bymann og stril (1984)
- Gudmund Rydning: Rigg Rock og oljeviser (1985)
- Den Nationale Scene / Knut Skodvin: Knut Gribb tar Bergenstoget (1986)
- Ivar Medaas & Ove Thue: Ansikt til ansikt (1987)
- Ove Thue: Brann Galla (1987)
- Seim Songkor: Jul med Seim Songkor (1988)
- Seim Songkor med solist Tove Karoline Knutsen: Veintetid (1988)
- Sissel Kyrkjebø: Soria Moria (1989)
- Ole Paus: Stjerner i rennesteinen (1989)
- Ole Paus: Sound of Newsweek (1989)
- Tor Endresen & Rune Larsen: Lollipop (1989)
- Odd Grythe, Åse Wentzel, Gunnar GP Pedersen: "Husker du" og andre allsangmelodier (1989)
- Ivar Medaas & Herbjørn Sørebø: Sjeldne typar (1989)
- Tor Endresen & Rune Larsen: Lollipop 2 (1990)
- Jan Grieg: The Shipping Casette (1990)
- Tor Endresen & Rune Larsen: Lollipop Jukebox (1990)
- Secret Mission: Strange Afternoon (1991)
- Kari & Ivar Medaas: Medaas gull (1992)
- Øyvind Hægland: We're in This Together (1992)
- Mostly Robinson: I Can't Stop Loving You (1992)
- Frode Rasmussen: Fra Evy'en med kjærlighet (1992)
- Rune Larsen: Røtter (1993)
- Ivar Medaas: Langs fjorden (1994)
- Ove Thue: Vi e' på vei te USA (1994)
- Trygve Thue: Jeg – en Beach Boy (1994)
- Ole Paus: Jeg kaller det vakker musikk: Hjemmevant utenfor – Ca. 40 Beste (1994)
- Clive Scott ft. Zoltan Vince: In a Jazzy Mood (1994)
- Atle Hansen: Blå måne (1995)
- Herborg Kråkevik: Mi Haugtussa (1995)
- Øyvind Hægland: I'll Be Home For X-Mas (Radio-Version) (Singl) (1995)
- Ove Thue: Vi går frem (1995)
- Musikkmagasinet Ballade: Tradisjonen tro? (1995)
- Tor Endresen & Rune Larsen: Det Beste Fra Lollipop (1995)
- Dag Arnesen: Rusler rundt Grieg – Kjente toner i nye tolkninger (1996)
- Kenneth Sivertsen: Draumespor (1996)
- Mostly Robinson: Guess Who Is Here (1997)
- Absolutt Relativt: My Heart Is Your Machine Gun (1998)
- Kenneth Sivertsen: One Day in October (1998)
- Diverse Artister: Absolute Norsk (1998)
- Anne Lorentzen: Såre sinn (1999)
- Havet: Havet (1999)
- Diverse Artister: Bare Bra Musikk - Samle CD
- Diverse Artister: Nordhordland Veteranbåtlag (2001)
- Millpond Moon: Nation of Two (2001)
- Ivar Medaas: 50 beste (2001)
- Steve Morgan: Heaven Help Me (2001)
- Kim Fairchild: All of Me – Selected Songs by Billie Holiday (2003)
- Robert Vennström: Till lands (2003)
- Brendan McKinney: Right Where I Came In (2003)
- Rannva & Siggi: Someone Cares (2003)
- Steve Morgan: Shadow Dancing (2003)
- Andreas Friis Jørgensen: Berøringer (2004)
- Tor Endresen & Rune Larsen: Det Beste Fra (2004)
- Kenneth Sivertsen: Fløyel (2004)
- Jim Gordon: Scenic Tours in the Darkness (2004)
- Tre Vise Menn: Forbud Mot å Fly (2004)
- Tron Jensen (1966): Ocean (2005)
- The Owens: It Was Near I Died (2005)
- Brendan McKinney: My Dad's Car (2006)
- Lasse Myrvold-hyllest: Dans til musikken (2006)
- Barneselskapet: Barna synger Pophits (2006)
- Gest: I Grevens tid (Single) (2007)
- Kurt Hatten: Minner (2007)
- Jan Holden: Rino Og Sjørøvertrioen (2007)
- Elisabeth Lahr: Polkadot Security (2009)
- Anne Hvidsten: The Bubble Burst (2009)
- Tor Endresen & Rune Larsen: Lollipop – 50 beste (2010)
- Britt Synnøve Johansen: Skyt meg med tre roser (2010)
- Britt Synnøve Johansen: Baleame con tres rosas (2010)
- Brendan McKinney: Best They Can (2010)
- Helge Nyheim: The Ride Back Home (2010)
- Barbro Husdal Quartet: Chin of Gold (2011)
- Carsten Dyngeland Trio: Trio Music (2011)
- Nøkken: Nøkken 2012 (2012)
- Norsk jazzforum: Jazz From Norway 2012 – JazzCD.no 5th Set (2012)
- Kåre Kalvenes: Biter av tid (2012)
- Ivar Medaas: Ivar Medaas Beste (2012)
- Dagdriverne: På tide å dra hjem (2013)
- Maria Ulstein Ellefsen & Torstein Kayser: When Passion Sings (2013)
- Hans Marius Andersen: Autumn Leaves (2013)
- Hans Marius Andersen: Embraceable You (2013)
- ESS Engros: Musikk for byfolk & stril (2013)
- Einar Helgaas: Om eg lever (2014)
- Miriam og Joel Dyrhovden: Deg Eg Eiga Må (2014)
- Øyvind Hægland: I'll Be Home for X-Mas (2015)
- Ove Thue: 4 x 20 fra Ove Thue (2015)
- Tommy Aslaksen: Daarlig dag (2016)
- Ove Thue: En tid for kjærlighet (2016)
- Into the Beast med Marita Moe Sandven (2016)
- Marion Rodgers: Tålmodighet (Single) (2016)
- Robert Vennström og Heine Bugge: Till det eviga (2017)
- Kor-Mix: Gå med glede (2017)
- Kivi: Babyland (2017)
- Into The Beast: Twelve Tracks of Our Ghosts to Come (2017)
- Bente Bratlund & Tarjei Vatne: Her er eg no (2017)
- Robert Vennström & Heine Bugge: Till egna barn och andras ungar (2017)
- Julian Misic: Maestro (2018)
- Hver gang vi møtes: Hver gang vi møtes – Sesong 7 (2018)
- Into The Beast: Headless Bodies Homeless Hearts med Marita Moe Sandven (2019)
- Julian Berntzen, Herborg Kråkevik, Hans Marius Mittet: Prologe - Aldri Skal Du Gråte (Single) - Live Versjon Fra Den Nationale Scene 2018 (2019)
- Julian Berntzen, Herborg Kråkevik, Hans Marius Mittet: Aldri Skal Du Gråte (Single) - Live Versjon Fra Den Nationale Scene 2018 (2019)
- Waterwagon: Go For Tomorrow (Single) (2019)
- Waterwagon: Movin' On (Single) (2019)
- Robert Vennström & Heine Bugge: Tillit (2019)
- Waterwagon: Go For Tomorrow (2019)
- Diverse Artister: Norske Hits - Gamle og nye favoritter (2019)
- Gudmund Rydning: Gitarspill Og Poesi (2020)
- Mareike Wang: Holda Oss I Lag (Single) (2020)
- Into The Beast: The Tinkerbell Spell (2020)
- Waterwagon: Dear Friend (Single) (2020)
- Alexander Flotve: Friselliana (2020)
- Marion Rodgers: Ting På Hjertet (2020)
- Waterwagon: Waterfalls And Roses (Single) (2021)
- Waterwagon: The Very First Moment (Single) (2021)
- Waterwagon: Wake Up Call (Single) (2021)
- Djupål: Windows (Single) (2022)
- Waterwagon: Final Song (Single) (2022)
- Waterwagon: In Real Life (2022)
- Bergen Vista Social Club: Lille Havanna (2022)
- Julian Berntzen, Herborg Kråkevik, Brit Bildøen: Alle Elder Brenner Ut Omsider (Single) - Live Versjon Fra Den Nationale Scene 2018 (2022)
- Into the Beast med Marita Moe Sandven: Human Heart (2022)
