= Nathalie Nordnes =

Norwegian singer (born 1984)

- Born: November 22, 1984 (age 41); Bergen, Norway
- Occupation: Singer
- Years active: 2003–present
- Labels: Virgin Records; Oliver Records; Bonnier Amigo

Nathalie Nordnes (born 22 November 1984, in Bergen) is a Norwegian singer. She released her first album on Virgin Records in 2003, and her fourth album in November 2011. Most of her recorded output is sung in English.

Her debut album Hush Hush with guitarist Mads Berven was released in 2003, which included a duet ("Good Times") with Sondre Lerche, whom she had dated. A video was produced for "Only Because." The album spent 19 weeks on the Norwegian charts, rising to number 8, and achieved gold status.

Hush Hush was followed by Join Me In The Park in 2005, which included the single "Cars and Boys". It spent two weeks on the Norwegian charts, reaching number 16.

These first two albums were produced by Hans Petter Gundersen and Kato Ådland. Gunderson first started working with Nordnes when she was 14, and introduced her to Eirik Johansen at EMI, the parent owner of Virgin Records, which led to her record contract.

Nordnes subsequently parted ways with her record label and released Letters in 2009 on her own label, Oliver Records. The album was recorded in Italy and produced by Rob Ellis.

Nordnes' fourth album N.N. was released in November 2011. Prior to the album release, the single America was released, with a video filmed in Bergen and New York City that debuted in early October 2011.

== Discography ==
- 2003: Hush Hush (Virgin Records)
- 2005: Join Me In The Park (Virgin Records)
- 2009: Letters (Oliver Records / Bonnier Amigo)
- 2011: N.N. (Oliver Records)

== Visual identity ==
Her logo was designed by Martin Kvamme of Unit Delta Plus.
