= Baba Yaga (album) =

Studio album by Annbjørg Lien
- Released: November 1, 1999
- Genre: Nordic
- Length: 49:38
- Label: Grappa Music
- Producer: Bjørn Ole Rasch

Annbjørg Lien chronology
Prisme (1996)	Baba Yaga (1999)	Aliens Alive (2002)

Baba Yaga is the fourth studio album by Norwegian fiddler and multi-instrumentalist Annbjørg Lien, released on 1 November 1999 by Grappa Music (GMCD 4158). In a departure from her previous records—such as Prisme (1996) and Felefeber (1994)—, which feature more acoustic, traditional sets, Baba Yaga consists primarily of Lien's own compositions, arranged in a more "modern", futuristic style, and utilizing synthesizers, programming. and various digital effects effectively. The tracks tell their many stories against lush arrangements, with longtime collaborators Bjørn Ole Rasch (of Bukkene Bruse) and guitarist Roger Tallroth (of Swedish folk "super-group" Väsen).

Standout track include the album's opener, "Loki", a dark, mysterious tune centered around the Norse god of chaos and featuring Lien on the Swedish nyckelharpa (keyed fiddle); "Astra", which also sees Lien on the nyckelharpa, is another intense journey, evoking images of icebergs and northern lights, with interpolations of "Agnus Dei"; "Baba Yaga", the title track, features dual tracks of Lien on both Hardanger fiddle and nyckelharpa, with an almost Indian or Middle Eastern sound to the arrangement, the tune inspired by the Slavic witch of the same name; "Old Larry" is a sort of "polka" tune played by Lien on Hardingfele, with some flute accompaniment, providing a lighthearted contrast to the album's intensity; "Inoque", a Hardanger fiddle and flute piece, was inspired by Lien's humanitarian trips to East Africa, where she played music for and danced with the Maasai, especially bonding with the children. The singing of the children can be heard throughout the track.

Professional ratings
Review scores
Source	Rating
Allmusic	4.5/5 stars
Dagbladet	5/6 stars

== Reviews and critical reception ==
Terje Mosnes, of Norwegian newspaper Dagbladet, wrote: "With wisdom from tales about the Slavic witch Baba Yaga as an ideological superstructure, harding [Hardanger] fiddler Annbjørg Lien is returning with an album out of the ordinary again. It appears in the musical landscape where pounding drums, whistles and synths around fill the air around her fiddle with exciting inventions." Additionally, Mosnes gave the album 5/5 stars.

Mick Moll of FolkWorld stated the record was "Powerful and in[n]ovative", saying that "…with impressionistic melodies and new combinations[,] she conjures up a musical landscape of abundance—gathering from traditions both near and far." Moll also stated that Lien was Norway's "most exciting new folk musician[…] Baba Yaga is an exceptional[,] strong album."

Allmusic reviewer Chris Nickson awarded the album 4.5/5 stars.

== Track listing ==
1. "Loki" (4:31)
2. "Irianda" (3:29)
3. "Astra" (4:51)
4. "Ája" (6:47)
5. "Baba Yaga" (4:45)
6. "Old Larry" (4:29)
7. "January" (3:19)
8. "Ritual" (4:30)
9. "Inoque" (4:43)
10. "Wackidoo" (4:26)
11. "W." (3:48)

== Personnel ==
- Annbjørg Lien – Hardanger fiddle (hardingfele), keyed fiddle (nyckelharpa), vocals
- Terje Isungset – mouth harp
- Roger Tallroth – bouzouki, 12-string guitar, mandola
- Svein Dag Hauge – guitar
- Bjørn Ole Rasch – keyboards, Mini Moog
- Hans Fredrik Jacobsen – Swedish bagpipes (säckpipa), clarinet, flute, whistles, oud
- Rune Arnesen – drums, percussion
- Ailo Gaup – vocals (track no. 4)

String quartet:

- Arve Moen Bergset – first violin
- Per Sæmund Bjørkum – second violin
- Johannes Gustavsson – viola
- Øystein Sonstad – cello

== Credits ==
- Victor Boullet – photography
- Morten Lund – mastering
- Drew Miller – graphic remix
- Bjørn Ole Rasch – arranger, composer, producer & programming
- Roger Tallroth – arranger
