= Prisme =

Studio album by Annbjørg Lien
- Released: 1996
- Genre: Traditional folk music
- Length: 50:49
- Label: Grappa Music
- Producer: Annbjørg Lien & Bjørn Ole Rasch

Annbjørg Lien chronology
Felefeber (1994)	Prisme (1996)	Baba Yaga (1999)

Prisme is the third studio album by Norwegian Hardanger fiddler and nyckelharpa player Annbjørg Lien. Released internationally on 25 October 1996 through the Norwegian Grappa label (Grappa Musikkforlag #GRCD 4113), it was released on March 18, 1997, in North America through Shanachie Records (Shanachie #64082).

In a decidedly more "modern" approach, Lien, alongside longtime bandmates and collaborators Bjørn Ole Rasch and Roger Tallroth (guitarist of Swedish folk group Väsen), and woodwinds player Hans Fredrik Jacobsen, weave together ancient sounds and imagery with more modern arrangements. In a departure from her previous album, Felefeber: Norwegian Fiddle Fantasia (1994), which features a traditional reperoite of tunes, the majority of Prisme features music which is composed by either Lien herself or together with Rasch.

Lien experiments with different rhythms and time signatures on this album, such as her own piece “Fønix” ("phoenix"), an almost Spanish/flamenco-sounding tune in 7/8 time, or the lively “Fløteren” (“the log-driver”), which changes time signature repeatedly, switching between 5/8 and 2/4. Many of the arrangements are lush, deep and personal, often evoking images of the Arctic and Scandinavia, such as the mysterious “Cantabile”, the sweet “Aprilbarnet”, the dark and intense “Korstog” and “Galadriel”, and the melancholy “The Ring”. “Luseblus” is a modern Norwegian "folk-blues" tune, featuring a minor scale that vascillates between major and minor at the end. The album's title track was inspired by Lien's travels to China; “Prisme” is a triumphant yet meditative piece played on Hardanger fiddle, with an “East Asian” influence to the melody. The track features an erhu player during the intro, and finishes with the sounds of meditation bells, light bamboo flute, and a woman performing traditional Buddhist chanting.

Professional ratings
Review scores
Source	Rating
Allmusic	4/5 stars
Dagbladet	5/6 stars

== Review ==
Anders Grønneberg from Dagbladet stated: "On her third international solo album[,] Lien goes new ways in relation to the musical tradition she carries. The traditional costume is left at home, and Prism[e] is recorded with jeans on. The result is a typically un-Norwegian[-] and Swedish[-]sounding album, where Lien expands her horizons[,] creating traditional folk music fused with modern instrumentation[,] like percussion and electronic instruments, in addition to the classic wind and string instruments as we know from the Nordic traditional music."

== Reception ==
An Allmusic review rated the album 4/5 stars, and the aforementioned review by Anders Grønneberg (of the Norwegian daily newspaper Dagbladet) awarded the album 5.

== Tracks and composers ==
1. «Villvinter» (Wild Winter) (2:53) (Traditional; arr. Bjørn Ole Rasch)
2. «Fønix» (Phoenix) (4:08) (A. Lien, B. Rasch)
3. «Cantabile» (3:59) (Tone Hulbækmo; arr. A. Lien)
4. «Luseblus» (Lice Blues) (3:34) (A. Lien)
5. «Vidvandre» (Wandering) (4:02) (A. Lien)
6. «Aprilbarnet» (April Child) (3:24) (A. Lien)
7. «Korstog» (Crusade) (4:35) (A. Lien, B. Rasch)
8. «Hauk» (4:00) (Lien)
9. «Prisme» (Prism) (5:12) (Lien)
10. «Fløteren» (The Log-Driver) (4:12) (A. Lien, B. Rasch)
11. «Galadriel» (3:56) (A. Lien, B. Rasch)
12. «Valhalling» (Halling from Val) (3:27) (A. Lien)
13. «Ringen» (The Ring) (3:33) (Lien)

== Personnel ==
- Annbjørg Lien – Hardingfele, fiddles, nyckelharpa
- Bjørn Ole Rasch – keyboards, piano, Hammond organ, sampler
- Roger Tallroth – guitars, mandolin, bouzouki
- Hans Fredrik Jacobsen – tin whistle, kantele & säckpipa (Swedish pipes)
- Mikael Marin – viola
- Rune Arnesen – percussion

== Credits ==
- Producer – Annbjørg Lien
- Producer & arranger – Bjørn Ole Rasch
- Morten Lund - mastering
- Recording & mixing – Trond Engebretsen
- Composer – Annbjørg Lien (tracks 2, 4–13)
- Composer – Bjørn Ole Rasch (tracks: 1–2, 7 & 10–11)
