= Nyhus =

Nyhus is a surname. Notable people with the surname include:

- Ani Nyhus (born 1983), Canadian softball pitcher
- Åshild Breie Nyhus (born 1975), Norwegian musician
- Egil Nyhus (born 1962), Norwegian illustrator
- Ingfrid Breie Nyhus (born 1978), Norwegian pianist
- Svein Nyhus (born 1962), Norwegian illustrator and writer of children's books
- Sven Nyhus (born 1932), Norwegian folk musician, fiddler, composer and musicologist
