= Spel =

Live album by Bukkene Bruse
- Released: February 9, 2004
- Genre: Traditional folk music
- Length: 61:18
- Label: Grappa Music

Bukkene Bruse chronology
Den Fagraste Rosa (2001)	Spel (2004)

Spel (released February 9, 2004, on the Heilo catalog at the Grappa label – HCD 7188) is a live recording and the fifth album from the Norwegian folk band Bukkene Bruse.

== Review ==
Bukkene Bruse, alone and in creative interaction, creates new Norwegian folk music, yet traditional, with the album Spel. This likable traditional folk band comes up with a live recording of their most famous songs. All in new arrangements together with new material. The sound is good, and in addition the musicians are performing some solo tunes in a convincing manner. This time they also perform with the Norwegian string quartet Vertavo, that gives the album an extra energy.

== Track listing ==
1. «Folketone Fra Sunnmøre» (4:19)
2. «En Enda Villere Vinter» (4:10)
3. «Syng I Stille Morgonstunder» (3:24)
  Trilogi
4. «Bruremarsj Fra Østerdalen» (3:05)
5. «Norafjølls» (6:51)
6. «Stev» (4:35)
7. «Fanitullen Goes To America» (4:53)
  Solospel
8. «Tannlausen / Vil Du Koma Til Rinden» (3:44)
9. «Nystev Og Gamlestev» (3:06)
10. «Bømarislåtten» (3:53)
11. «Ein Annan Halling» (3:32)
12. «St. Sunniva» (3:33)
13. «Haslebuskane» (2:37)
14. «Maria, Hun Er En Jomfru Reen» (3:03)
15. «Mit Hjerte Altid Vanker» (6:26)

== Personnel ==
- Arve Moen Bergset – vocals, violin & Hardingfele
- Annbjørg Lien – Hardingfele & nyckelharpa
- Steinar Ofsdal – flute
- Bjørn Ole Rasch – pipe organ

Vertavo String Quartet

- Øyvor Volle – violin
- Annabelle Meare – violin
- Berit Cardas – viola
- Bjørg Lewis – cello
