= Den Fagraste Rosa =

Studio album by Bukkene Bruse
- Released: 2001
- Genre: Traditional folk music
- Length: 44:54
- Label: Grappa Music

Bukkene Bruse chronology
Steinstolen (1998)	Den Fagraste Rosa (2001)	Spel (2004)

Den Fagraste Rosa / Loveliest Rose (released 2001 / 2002 on the Heilo catalog at the Grappa label – HCD 7168) is the first Christmas album from Norwegian folk band Bukkene Bruse.

== Reception ==
Professional ratings
Review scores
Source	Rating
AllMusic	4/5 stars

AllMusic awarded the album 4 stars and in its review, Chris Nickson said, "This is a different Christmas album, with songs that are not sung as much around the Christmas tree. There are also old fiddle tunes that are related to Christmas."

== Track listing ==
1. «Eit barn er født i Betlehem» (3:18)
2. «Lullámus» (3:15)
3. «Haugebonden» (5:14)
4. «Juleftan» (3:38)
5. «Mit hjerte altid vanker» (6:32)
6. «St. Sunniva» (3:44)
7. «Et lidet barn saa lystelig / I denne søde juletid» (7:20)
8. «Så spela far juleftan» (3:02)
9. «Den fagraste rosa er funni» (2:35)
10. «Romjulsgangar» (3:22)
11. «For saadan' mildheds gaver» (2:53)

== Personnel ==
- Arve Moen Bergset – vocals, violin & Hardingfele
- Annbjørg Lien – Hardingfele & nyckelharpa
- Steinar Ofsdal – flute
- Bjørn Ole Rasch – pipe organ
