= Jorun Marie Kvernberg =

Norwegian musician (born 1979)

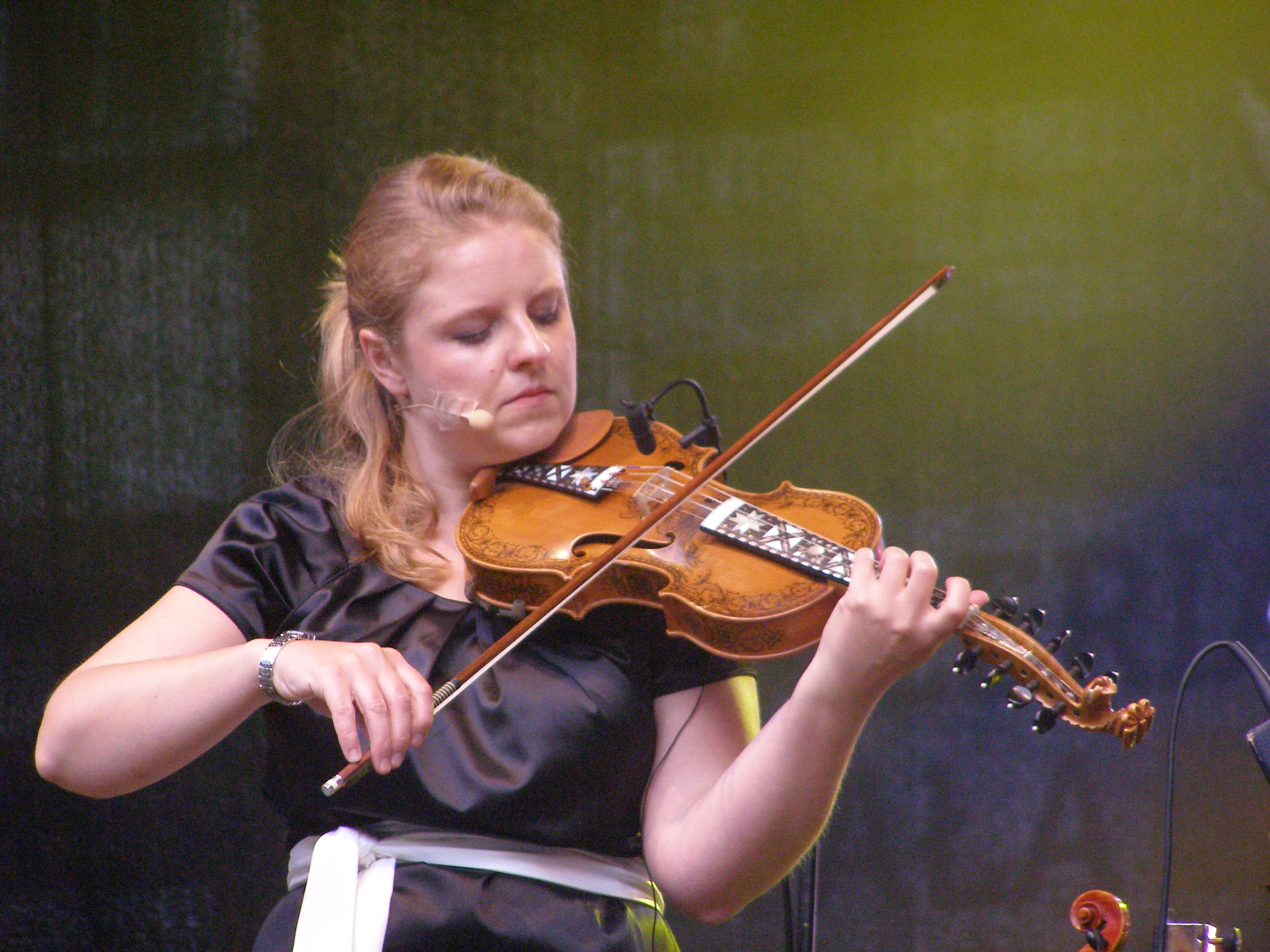
- Kvernberg at the Tindra and Kroke koncert during the 30th Festival of Music in Gdansk, Inspired by Folklore, 29 July 2010.

Background information
- Born: Jorun Marie Rypdal Kvernberg; 10 July 1979 (age 47); Fræna Municipality, Møre og Romsdal
- Origin: Norway
- Genre: Traditional music
- Occupations: Musician, composer
- Instruments: Hardingfele, violin, vocals
- Website: www.jorunkvernberg.com

Jorun Marie Rypdal Kvernberg (born 10 July 1979) is a Norwegian traditional musician (hardingfele, violin, vocals) and composer, known from a series of recordings. She is the daughter of traditional musicians Liv Rypdal Kvernberg and Torbjørn Kvernberg, and the sister of classical musician Kari Kvernberg Dajani and jazz violinist Ola Kvernberg, and granddaughter of the fiddler and traditional music composer Peter L. Rypdal.

== Career ==
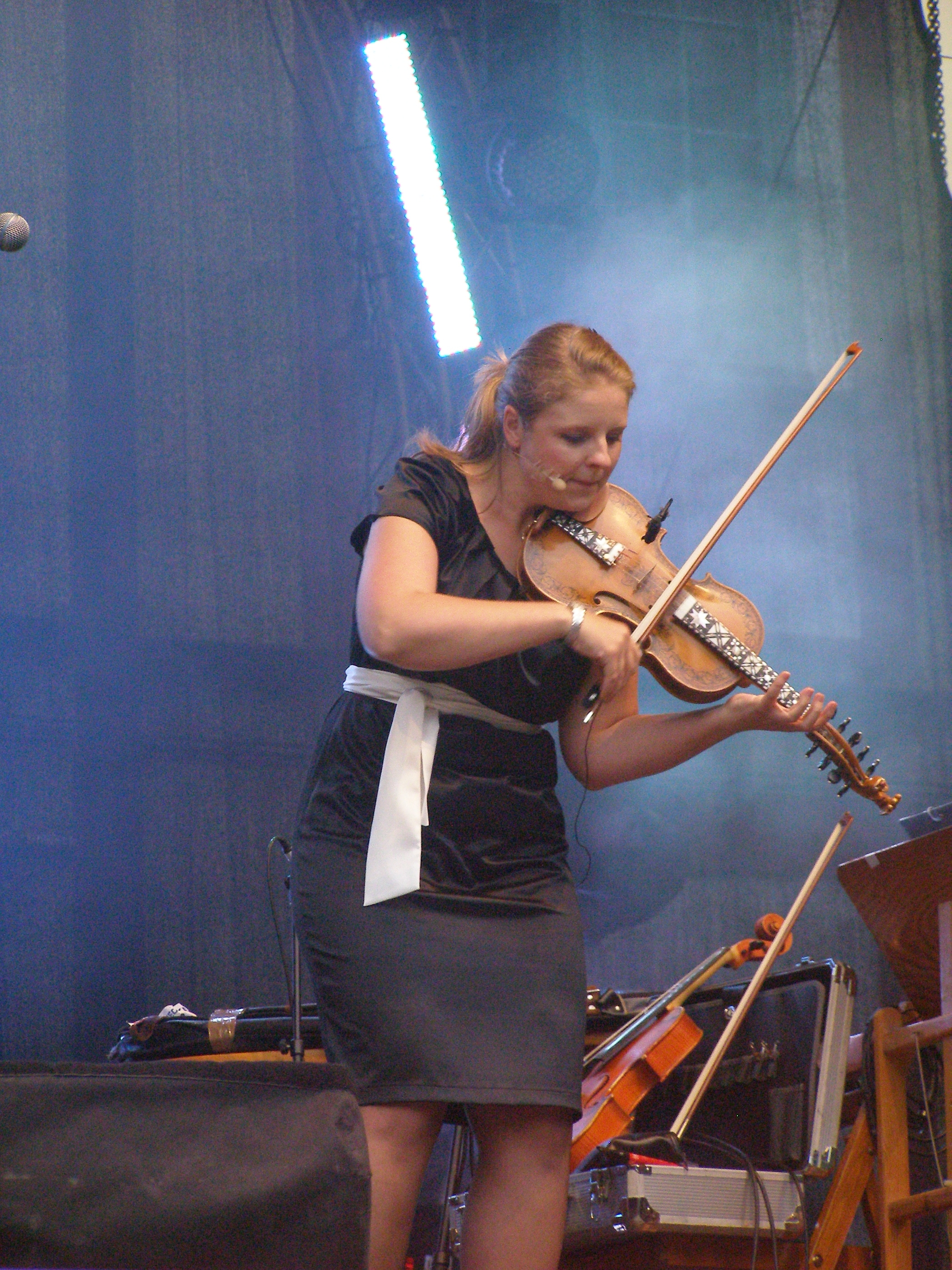
Kvernberg in Gdansk 29 July 2010.

Kvernberg was born in Fræna Municipality in Romsdal, and studied traditional music at Norges Musikkhøgskole from 1999 to 2003. She also has practical pedagogical education from the same institution. She works as a freelance traditional fiddler, and released her first solo album, "Album" (2006) on the label ta:lik.

As a soloist Kvernberg is focused on the folk music from Møre og Romsdal, and she has since 2000 played in the bands Tindra and Majorstuen. Tindra has released four records, among them Den kvite hjorten (2009) with Helge Jordal. Majorstuen has released six albums, the first album Majorstuen (2002) was awarded Spellemannprisen 2003, the latest five albums were released on their own label, "Majorstuen Fiddlers Company" (MFC).

In addition, Kvernberg plays in a series of other bands, has toured worldwide, and has received the National Arts Scholarship 2009–10.

== Honors ==
- 2003: Awarded Spellemannprisen for the album Majorstuen (2002) in the class Traditional music, with "Majorstuen"
- 2003: Awarded "Øivind Berghs Minnepris"
- 2004: Winner of solo class at "Landsfestivalen for gamaldans"
- 2005: Winner of lanseringsprogrammet INTROfolk05, with "Majorstuen"
- 2005: Winner of Kvartsprisen, with "Tindra"
- 2005: Winner of TONO's Edvard Prize for the work ”Då kom du” (When you arrived), the first award to the Traditional Norwegian folk music genere
- 2007: Winner of "Vestlandskappleiken", open class (solo)
- 2007: Winner of "Folkelarmprisen" for the record Trillar for to class Innovative, with Bruvoll-Halvorsen
- 2008: Best Dance Play at "Landskappleiken" 2008 (solo)
- 2010: Awarded Spellemannprisen 2010 for the album Keramello in the class Traditional music, with Unni Boksasp Ensemble
- 2010: Winner of fiddler solo class (fiddle/hardingfele) at "Landsfestivalen for gamaldans"
- 2010: Winner of "Folkelarmprisen" for the record Keramello class Traditional, with Unni Boksasp Ensemble

== Discography ==
=== Solo works ===
- 2006: Album (Ta:lik), with slåtter (traditional tunes) from Møre og Romsdal
- 2013: Tidens Løsen (Ta:lik), with accordeonplayer Øyvind Sandum with slåtter (traditional tunes) after Ole P. Blø

=== Collaborative works ===
Within Majorstuen

- 2002: Majorstuen (2L)
- 2004: Jorun jogga (MFC)
- 2006: Juledrøm (MFC)
- 2010: Skir (MFC)
- 2013: Live in Concert (MFC)
- 2015: Kvitre (MFC)

Within Tindra

- 2006: Lukkeleg vaking (Ta:lik)
- 2009: Den kvite hjorten (Ta:lik), with Helge Jordal
- 2011: Moder Norge (Ta:lik)
- 2011: Live in Førde (Ta:lik), with Kroke

With others

- 2002: Inger Lise (Master Music, 2001), with Inger Lise Rypdal
- 2005: Home Sweet Home (Odeon/EMI, 2005), with Liv Marit Wedvik
- 2007: Klassisk Kalvik (Daworks, 2002), with Finn Kalvik
- 2007: Trillar for to (Grappa Music), with Bruvoll/Halvorsen
- 2007: Mot nye høyder (Tylden og co, 2007), Bjørns Orkester
- 2007: Songar frå Havdal (ta:lik), Unni Boksasp
- 2007: Jarnnetter (ta:lik), Camilla Granlien Band
- 2010: Keramello (Øra Musikk), Unni Boksasp Ensemble
- 2013: Kvite fuglar (UBE), Unni Boksasp Ensemble
- 2013: Valseria (Etnisk Musikklubb), Gabriel Fliflet
