= Hulbækmo =

Hulbækmo is a surname. Notable people with the surname include:

- Alf Hulbækmo (born 1992), Norwegian musician and composer
- Hans Hulbækmo (born 1989), Norwegian musician and composer
- Tone Hulbækmo (born 1957), Norwegian singer and musician
