= Frode Haltli =

Norwegian accordion player

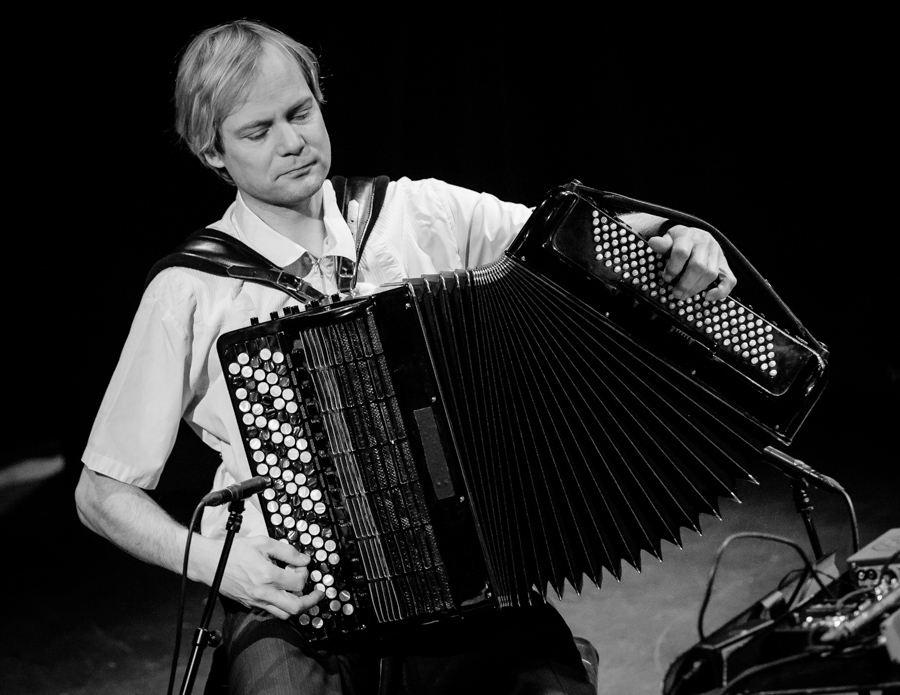
- Frode Haltli onstage, 2018

Background information
- Born: 15 May 1975 (age 51); Levanger Municipality, Sør-Trøndelag
- Origin: Norway
- Genres: Jazz Contemporary classical Experimental music Folk
- Occupations: Musician, composer
- Instrument: Accordion
- Website: www.frodehaltli.com

Frode Haltli (born 15 May 1975 in Levanger Municipality), is a Norwegian accordion player.

== Biography ==
Haltli started to play the accordion at the age of seven and over the following few years he won several national competitions and scholarships and was awarded first prize in Norwegian TV's Talentiaden 1991. He studied the accordion at The Norwegian Academy of Music in Oslo from 1994 and at the Royal Danish Conservatory of Music in Copenhagen, where he debuted with a concert in 2000.

He was awarded the Young Soloist of the Year prize 2001 by the Norwegian Concert Institute at the Bergen International Festival 2000, as well as second prize in the prestigious International Gaudeamus Interpreters Competition in the Netherlands.

His debut album Looking on Darkness (2002) was awarded Spellemannprisen (a Norwegian Grammy) for the best contemporary music album. He also received the French Prix Gus Viseur in 2004 for the same album. His next album Passing images (2007) featured his own interpretations of Norwegian folk. He was joined by Arve Henriksen, Garth Knox and Maja Ratkje on this album.

Frode currently (2026) lives in Svartskog, close to Oslo but frequently tours abroad, in Europe, Russia, America and Asia. He has performed as a soloist with major orchestras around the world and is actively working with chamber music—the trio POING taking up much of his time currently. The trio, with Rolf-Erik Nystrøm on the saxophone and Håkon Thelin on the double bass, mainly performs contemporary music.

He also often performs with his own 10-piece ensemble Avant Folk, Trygve Seim (with whom he released two duo albums on the German label ECM), with Håkon Kornstad Trio, with Scandinavian folk musicians like singer Unni Løvlid, fiddlers Vegar Vårdal, Gjermund Larsen, Ragnhild Furebotten and nyckelharpist Emilia Amper.

== Discography (selected) ==
=== Solo albums ===
- 2002: Looking on Darkness (ECM New Series), with the Vertavo String Quartet
- 2007: Passing images (ECM)
- 2012: Arne Nordheim Complete Accordion Works (Simax Classics)
- 2014: Vagabonde Blu (Hubro/Grappa)
- 2016: Air (ECM New Series), with the Trondheim Soloists and the Arditti Quartet
- 2018: Avant Folk (Hubro/Grappa)
- 2019: Border Woods (Hubro/Grappa)
- 2020: Selected Solo Works, Vol. 1-3 (Svartskog Music Production)
- 2021: Avant Folk II (Hubro/Grappa)
- 2023: Avant Folk Triptyk (Jazzland Recordings)

=== Collaborations ===
With POING

- 2003: Giants of Jazz (LLRR)
- 2005: Planet POING (Jazzaway)
- 2008: River Mouth Echoes (Tzadik) (POING: essential extensions)
- 2011: Wach auf! (Øra Fonogram), featuring Maja Ratkje
- 2016: Sur POING (Aurora/Grappa)
- 2016: Kapital & Moral (Grappa), featuring Maja Ratkje
- 2024: Almost Classic (LAWO)

With Trygve Seim

- 2004: Samgam (ECM)
- 2008: Yeraz (ECM)
- 2016: Rumi Songs (ECM)
- 2024: Our Time (ECM Records)

others

- 2002: RUSK: RUSK (Heilo/Grappa)
- 2006: RUSK: RUSK II (Heilo/Grappa)
- 2016: Andreas Ulvo/Sigurd Hole/Frode Haltli: StaiStua (NorCD)
- 2018: Håkon Kornstad Trio: Im Treibhaus (Grappa)
- 2019: Snowflake Trio:Sun Dogs (Ta:lik)
- 2019: Ragnhild Furebotten:Klopper (Ta:lik)
- 2019: Erlend Apneseth Trio with Frode Haltli: Salika, Molika (Hubro/Grappa)
- 2021: Håkon Kornstad Trio: For You Alone (Jazzland)
- 2022: Inger Hannisdal: North South East West (OKWorld/Jazzland)
