= Come Home (Annbjørg Lien and Bjørn Ole Rasch album) =

Studio album by Annbjørg Lien & Bjørn Ole Rasch
- Released: 2009
- Recorded: Kongshavn Studios in Kristiansand, Norway
- Genre: Traditional folk music
- Length: 47:12
- Label: Grappa Music
- Producer: Annbjørg Lien Bjørn Ole Rasch

Annbjørg Lien chronology
Waltz With Me (2008)	Come Home (2009)	Alle Vegne (2010)

Come Home (released 2009 on the Heilo catalog by the Grappa label – HCD 7244) is a studio album by the couple Annbjørg Lien and Bjørn Ole Rasch.

Professional ratings
Review scores
Source	Rating
Aftenposten	5/6 stars
Dagbladet	5/6 stars

== Review ==
On this album the Norwegian traditional musician and Hardanger fiddle virtuoso Annbjørg Lien teams up with her husband, foot bellows organist Bjørn Ole Rasch, for a wonderful and eclectic album featuring Hardanger fiddle, harmonium and contemporary and fresh versions of traditional music. With distinct compositions and performances, and a wide range of musical influences, they continue breaking musical boundaries.

== Reception ==
The review by the Norwegian newspaper Aftenposten awarded the album dice 5, and the review by the Norwegian newspaper Dagbladet also awarded the album dice 5.

== Track listing ==
1. "Funk Trunk" (4:08)
2. "Jo The Gigant" (4:29)
3. "Come Home" (3:25)
4. "The Goblin's Halling/The Buckin' Mule" (3:22)
5. "Kongshavn" (2:55)
6. "Woody's Bounce" (3:32)
7. "The Old Car" (4:09)
8. "Phelia/January" (7:14)
9. "Roquebrune" (4:39)
10. "Hässleholm" (3:58)
11. "The Little Goblin" (3:39)

== Personnel ==
- Annbjørg Lien – Hardingfele, fiddle, keyed fiddle and vocals
- Bjørn Ole Rasch – foot bellows organ, harmonium and vocals

== Credits ==
- Mastering – Roald Råsberg
- Mixing – Trond Engebretsen
- Recording – Trond Engebretsen

== Notes ==
- Recorded and mixed at Kongshavn Studios in Kristiansand, Norway
