= Tuva Syvertsen =

Norwegian musician (born 1983)

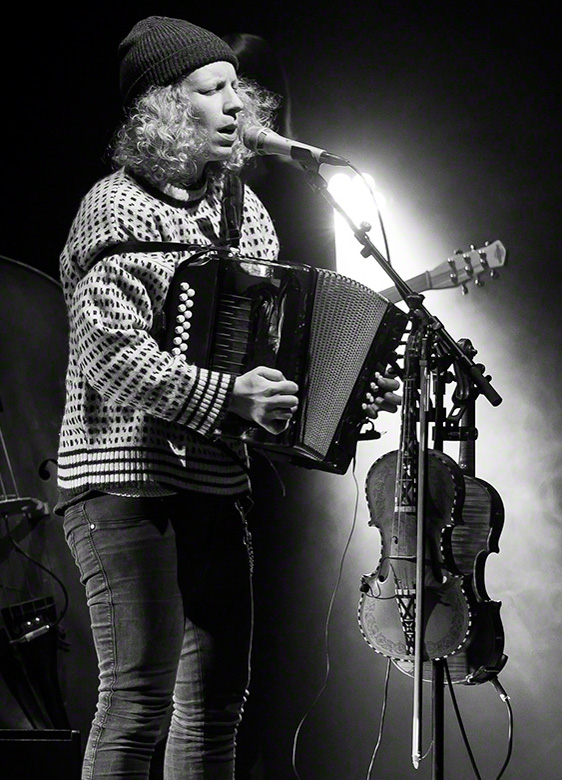
- Tuva Syvertsen at Cosmopolite

Background information
- Born: Tuva Livsdatter Syvertsen; 16 July 1983 (age 42); Oslo, Norway
- Genres: Traditional folk, rock
- Occupations: Musician and composer
- Instruments: Vocals, hardingfele, accordion
- Labels: Heilo
- Website: www.valkyrienallstars.com

Tuva Livsdatter Syvertsen (born 16 July 1983) is a Norwegian musician (vocals, hardingfele and accordion). She was born in Oslo but grew up at Brønnøya. Syvertsen is known from a number of album releases and cooperations with Hildegunn Øiseth, Aasmund Nordstoga, DumDum Boys and as a leading figure of Valkyrien Allstars.

== Career ==
Syvertsen is best known as a fiddle player, singer and front figure of the band Valkyrien Allstars, together with Ola Hilmen and Erik Sollid.

In 2010, she participated at the show Det store korslaget on Norwegian television TV 2, and she busted out in 3rd episode of the program. In 2012, she participated in the show Stjernekamp on NRK1.

== Personal life ==
As of 2017, Syvertsen was in a cohabiting relationship with another woman, Marie, for whom Syvertsen dedicated a yoik to honor her Sami heritage.

== Honors ==
- Grappas debutant Award 2006, within Valkyrien Allstars
- Commission for Telemarkfestivalen 2012, together with Susanna Wallumrød

== Discography ==
Within Valkyrien Allstars

- 2007: Valkyrien Allstars (Heilo)
- 2009: To Måner (Heilo)
- 2011: Ingen Hverdag (Heilo)
- 2014: Farvel Slekt Og Venner (Heilo)

With other prosjects

- 2008: Gangsterpolka (Grappa Music), with "Ompakara»
- 2008: Spelferd heim (Djønno Records), with Rannveig Djønne
- 2009: Hildring, with Hildegunn Øiseth
- 2009: Ein visefugg (Warner Music), with Aasmund Nordstoga
- 2011: Chapels and Bars (Bluestown), with Rita Engedalen
- 2012: Ti Liv (Oh Yeah!), with DumDum Boys
- 2012: Broken Soul Blues (Bluestown), with Margit Bakken & Rita Engedalen
- 2018: Go Dig My Grave (Susanna), with Susanna Wallumrød

Awards
Preceded by Christian Blom	Recipient of the open class Edvardprisen; 2015	Succeeded by Morten Qvenild
