= Aliens Alive =

Live album by Annbjørg Lien
- Released: August 20, 2002
- Recorded: 2001
- Genre: Traditional folk music
- Length: 70:24
- Label: Grappa Music

Annbjørg Lien chronology
Baba Yaga (1999)	Aliens Alive (2002)	Waltz With Me (2008)

Aliens Alive, released 20 August 2002 by the Grappa Music label (GMCD #4178) is a live album by Norwegian fiddler and composer Annbjørg Lien. The record—titled after a fusion of her first and last name ("A. Lien")—features a modern, eclectic mix of traditional Norwegian tunes and Lien's own compositions, from intricate Hardanger fiddle solos ("The Rose", "Knepphalling", "Fykerud’s Farewell to America") to immersive musical journeys through the Arctic and beyond ("Loki", "Origins", "Larry Goes Log-Driving", "Inoque", "Astra", "Aliens Alive"). Also featured is a well-known piece by composer Germund Haugen, "The Water Lily" (tjønneblomen), and a blues-inspired track written by Lien, "Luseblus" ("lice blues").

Aliens Alive is a compilation of recordings taken during a month-long tour of Norway in 2002, mainly from the band's performance in Setesdal, Agder. Lien is expertly accompanied by her band, consisting of musicians Bjørn Ole Rasch (keyboards, synths), Roger Tallroth (guitar, of Väsen fame), Hans Fredrik Jacobsen (willow flute, whistle, mouth harp, såckpipa), Per Hillestad (drums), Rolf Kristensen (guitar), and Rune Arnesen (percussion). Acclaimed Sámi vocalist Ailo Gaup joins the band on "Origins" in a haunting display of traditional throat-singing, "Oainnahaus", featuring deep, droning, sustained vocal notes interspersed with the mimicking of animals and natural sounds.

== Track listing ==
1. «The Rose» (5:11)
  (Traditional)
2. «Loki»
  (Annbjørg Lien / Bjørn Ole Rasch (5:36)
3. «Origins: Tidr/Nordfjordhalling/Oainnahus/Homage/Phoenix» (14:35)
  (Annbjørg Lien / Bjørn Ole Rasch / traditional)
4. «The Water Lily» (5:13)
  (Gjermund Haugen)
5. «Morning Mood» (0:31)
  (Edvard Grieg)
6. «Knepphalling» (4:12)
  (Traditional)
7. «Larry Goes Log-Driving: Old Larry/The Log-Driver» (5:30)
  (Annbjørg Lien / Bjørn Ole Rasch)
8. «Luseblus» (5:02)
  (Annbjørg Lien)
9. «Astra» (5:12)
  (Annbjørg Lien / Bjørn Ole Rasch)
10. «Inoque» (4:40)
  (Annbjørg Lien / Bjørn Ole Rasch)
11. «Aliens Alive: Wackidoo/Crusade/The Wild Winter» (9:58)
  (Annbjørg Lien / Bjørn Ole Rasch / traditional)
12. «Fykerud's Farewell to America» (4:44)
  (Traditional)

== Personnel ==
- Annbjørg Lien – hardanger fiddle & nyckelharpa
- Roger Tallroth – guitar
- Rolf Kristensen – guitar & electric guitar
- Bjørn Ole Rasch – Jew's-harp, keyboards & sampling
- Hans Fredrik Jacobsen – flute, Jew's-harp & vocals
- Rune Arnesen – drums & percussion
- Per Hillestad – drums & percussion

== Credits ==
- Annbjørg Lien – arranger, composer & concept
- Morten Lund – mastering
- Drew Miller – graphic remix
- Helge Skodvin – cover photo
- Roger Tallroth – arranger
- Bjørn Ole Rasch – arranger, composer, concept & producer
