= Heilo Music albums discography =

The following is a summary of the Heilo Music albums. Heilo Music is a Norwegian record label with records published by the parent label Grappa Music.

Albums (in selection)

Catalogue no.	Artist	Title	Release date	Format
HCD 7033	Eivind Groven	Som Symra Rein Og Blå	1999	CD
HCD 7070	Ulens Kvintett	Lugume Leikje	1991	CD
HCD 7072	Hørkelgaddan	Ørsalmusikken	1991	CD
HCD 7077	Østerdølenes Spellmannslag	Østerdølenes Spellmannslag	1992	CD
HCD 7102	Veslemøy Solberg	Min Unge Song	1994	CD
HCD 7104	Chateau Neuf Spelemannslag	Spell	1995	CD
HCD 7112	Huldregåva	Ut På Vegom	1996	CD
HCD 7124	Sven Nyhus Sekstett	Grimen	1997-07-31	CD
HCD 7135	Yggdrasil	Herrelaus	1998	CD
HCD 7139	Various artists	Devil's Tune - Ethnic Music From The Twilight Zone	1998	CD
HCD 7143	Jigme Drukpa	Endless Songs From Bhutan	1998	CD
HCD 7145	Bukkene Bruse	Steinstolen	1999	CD
HCD 7160	Vibå Spelemannslag	Fela I Ura - Folkemusikk Frå Bjerkreim	2000	CD
HCD 7168	Bukkene Bruse	Den Fagraste Rosa	2001	CD
HCD 7169	Oofotr	Oofotr II - World Ambient	2001	CD
HCD 7178	Various artists	Wizard Women Of The North	1998	CD
HCD 7179	Rusk	Rusk	2002	CD
HCD 7180	Sinikka Langeland	Runoja	2002	CD
HCD 7184	Hans Fredrik Jacobsen	Vind	2003	CD
HCD 7185	Kirsten Bråten Berg, Marilyn Mazur, Lena Willemark	Stemmenes Skygge	2005	CD
HCD 7188	Bukkene Bruse	Spel	2004	CD
HCD 7192	Dvergmål	Song I Himmelsalar	2004	CD
HCD 7193	Skrekk	Skrekk	2004-05-31	CD
HCD 7194	Tore Bruvoll & Jon Anders Halvorsen	Nattsang	2004	CD
HCD 7197	Unni Løvlid	Vita	2005	CD
HCD 7199	Rusk	Rusk II	2006	CD
HCD 7201	Bridges	Live In China	2005	CD
HCD 7203	Sven Nyhus, Åshild Breie Nyhus, Ingfrid Breie Nyhus	Tre Nyhus	2005-06-06	CD
HCD 7204	Geitungen	Bra Kast!	2005	CD
HCD 7206	Benedicte Maurseth, Knut Hamre	Rosa I Botnen	2006-02-06	CD
HCD 7215	Elisabeth Vatn	Piper On The Roof	2009-10-26	CD
HCD 7216	Annbjørg Lien	Waltz With Me	2008	CD
HCD 7217	Tore Bruvoll & Jon Anders Halvorsen	Trillar For To	2007	CD
HCD 7218	Bjørgulv Straume	Frå Ætt Til Ætt	2007	CD
HCD 7219	Sven Nyhus Kvartett + Glåmos Spellmannslag	E' Du Bøl?	2007-06-18	CD
HCD 7220	Valkyrien Allstars	Valkyrien Allstars	2007-10-01	CD
HCD 7222	Benedicte Maurseth, Åsne Valland Nordli, Berit Opheim, Kristin Skaare	Fodne Ho Svara Stilt	2008-06-09	CD
HCD 7225	Carl Haakon Waadeland	Din Råta Tjuv	2008-02-18	CD
HCD 7233	Liv Runesdatter	Syng Hjerte	2008	CD
HCD 7235	Gjermund Larsen Trio	Ankomst	2008	CD
HCD 7237	Sven Nyhus & Asmund Bjørkens Sekstett	Bergroser Og Frøsøminner	2008-11-03	CD
HCD 7239	Various artists	Norske Ballader	2010	2CD
HCD 7240	Valkyrien Allstars	To Måner	2009-08-31	CD
HCD 7244	Annbjørg Lien & Bjørn Ole Rasch	Come Home	2009	CD
HCD 7246	Various artists	Oslo World Music Festival Rikskonsertene 2009	2009	2CD
HCD 7247	Unni Løvlid, Becaye Aw, Rolf-Erik Nystrøm	Seven Winds	2009	CD
HCD 7248	Sigrid Moldestad	Sandkorn	2010	CD
HCD 7249	Various artists	Freemuse & Deeyah Present: Listen To The Banned	2010	2CD
HCD 7252	Gjermund Larsen Trio	Aurum	2010-09-13	CD
HCD 7253	Sven Nyhus	På Storfele	2010-02-22	CD
HCD 7259	Benedicte Maurseth	Alde	2010-06-07	CD
HCD 7261	Knut Hamre	Ferd	2010	CD
HCD 7262	Elisabeth Holmertz, Anders Røine, Harald Skullerud, Elisabeth Vatn	Stave Church Songs - Martyred Saints & Sister Bells	2011-05-20	CD
HCD 7264	Knut Hamre, Benedicte Maurseth, Nils Økland, Philippe Pierlot, Elisabeth Seitz	Anima	2012-06-01	CD
HCD 7270	Valkyrien Allstars	Ingen Hverdag	2011-10-14	CD
HCD 7271	Unni Løvlid	Lux	2013-04-26	CD
HCD 7274	Gjermund Larsen Trio	Reise	2013-03-08	CD
HCD 7275	Valkyrien Allstars	Farvel Slekt Og Venner	2014-10-10	CD
HCD 7279	Rydvall Mjelva	Isbrytaren	2013	CD
HCD 7283	Erlend Apneseth	Blikkspor	2013-10-04	CD
HCD 7284	Erlend Viken Trio	Frie Tøyler	2014-01-31	CD
HCD 7287	Gunnar Stubseid, Ale Møller	Spor	2014-08-29	CD
HCD 7289	Kirsten Bråten Berg	'Tonesvarm gjennom 35 år	2014-11-28	2CD
HCD 7295	Anne Grete Lunner	Friland	2015-01-31	CD
HCD 7304	Tone Hulbækmo	Stifinner	2016-02-19	CD
HO 7001	Slinkombas	Slinkombas	1979	LP
HO 7002	Vandrerne	Vandrerne	1980	LP
HO 7005	Leif Rygg & Knut Hamre	Nøringen	1980	LP
HO 7015	Slinkombas	... Og Bas Igjen	1982	LP
HO 7024	Tone Hulbækmo	Kåmma No ....	1983	LP
HO 7034	Various artists	Noteliv Og Toneklang Med Ungdom Frå Hallingdal	1985	LP
HO 7040	Tone Hulbækmo	Svevende Jord	1986	LP
HO 7042	Hesjevoll & Myklemyrs Orkester	Helsing Til Styggevasshytta	1986	LP
HO 7045	Drengestumusikken	Karva Blanding	1986	LP
HO 7056	Ivar Medaas, Herbjørn Sørebø	Sjeldne Typar	1989-10-10	LP
HO 7059	Brochmann, Atle Halstensen	Brochmann / Halstensen	1989-10-10	LP
HO 7251	Valkyrien Allstars	Valkyrien Allstars / To Måner	2014-10-10	2LP
HO 7275	Valkyrien Allstars	Farvel Slekt Og Venner	2014-10-10	LP
