= Tore Bruvoll =

- Born: 30 October 1978 (age 47); Oslo
- Origin: Norway
- Genres: Traditional Norwegian folk music, folk-rock
- Occupations: Musician & composer
- Instruments: Guitar, banjo, dobro, mandolin, ukulele, low whistle
- Label: Ta:lik
- Website: Tore Bruvoll on Myspace

Tore Bruvoll (born 30 October 1978 in Tromsø) is a Norwegian musician (guitar and multi-instrumentalist), composer and music arranger.

== Career ==
Bruvoll was educated at Telemark University College (1997–1999), and is best known from the group Hekla Stålstrenga who have released two albums. He has also had great success with two otherprojects: "Den Store Norske Gitarkvartett" and the duo cooperation Bruvoll/Halvorsen together with the kveder Jon Anders Halvorsen. Bruvoll has collaborated with many other artists in traditional folk like Annbjørg Lien and String Sisters. Bruvoll has since the late 1990s worked closely with Ragnhild Furebotten, which has resulted in the founding of the band Hekla Stålstrenga, including two nominations for the Spellemannprisen and extensive touring in Norway as well as internationally.

Bruvoll also plays other instruments like banjo, dobro, mandolin, ukulele and low whistle as well as guitar.

== Honors ==
- 2006: Young Arts Scholarship by the Festival of Northern Norway within Hekla Stålstrenga

== Discography ==
Majorstuens – "Juledrøm" (2006) String Sisters "Live in Norway" cd&dvd (Grappa 2007) ALB – Lupus Island (2006) Steve Byrne – "Songs from home" (2006)

With Jogvan Andrias – "Soleidis saman" (2000)

With Jon Anders Halvorsen

- 2004: Nattasang (Heilo)
- 2007: Trillar For To (Heilo)

With String Sisters

- 2007: Live (Heilo)

With Ragnhild Furebotten

- 2008: Hekla Stålstrenga (Ta:lik), nominated for the Spellemannprisen 2008

Within Hekla Stålstrenga

- 2011: Makramé (Ta:lik), nominated for the Spellemannprisen] 2011
- 2013: Dyrandé (Ta:lik)

With Sondre Bratland

- 2011: Jol I Mi Song (Kirkelig Kulturverksted)
