= Sjøfløyte =

Norwegian musical instrument

The sjøfløyte (Norwegian: "sea flute", or kjøpefløyte, byfløyte) is a Norwegian variant of the recorder. This instrument first came to Norway by sea, thus its name, from Continental Europe in the 18th and 19th centuries, and was extensively copied largely from German-made instruments. The name "sea flute" is most common in Numedal, Telemark and Agder. On the west coast they are called "German flute", for its nation of origin. In Gudbrandsdalen, where it is found many 1700 numbers flutes, it is often called the "wooden flute." Egil Storbekken created his flute based on one found in Gudbrandsdalen.

As a result of the pietistic movement in Norway during the last half of the 19th century, the popular Hardanger fiddle was declared sinful, and many musicians began playing dance tunes on the flute instead. The sjøfløyte tradition began to die out in the 20th century, but was revived in the 1970s by musicians such as Per Midtstigen, Steinar Ofsdal, Tellef Kvifte and Ånon Egeland. Midtstigen and Ofsdal won the 1989 Grammy Award for their album Sjøfløyte. Among the former are important sjøfløyte players Knut Juveli and Herleik Stuvstad and sjøfløyte maker Nils Stuvstad.

== See also ==
- no:Tussefløyte (in Norwegian)
