= Valkyrien Allstars =

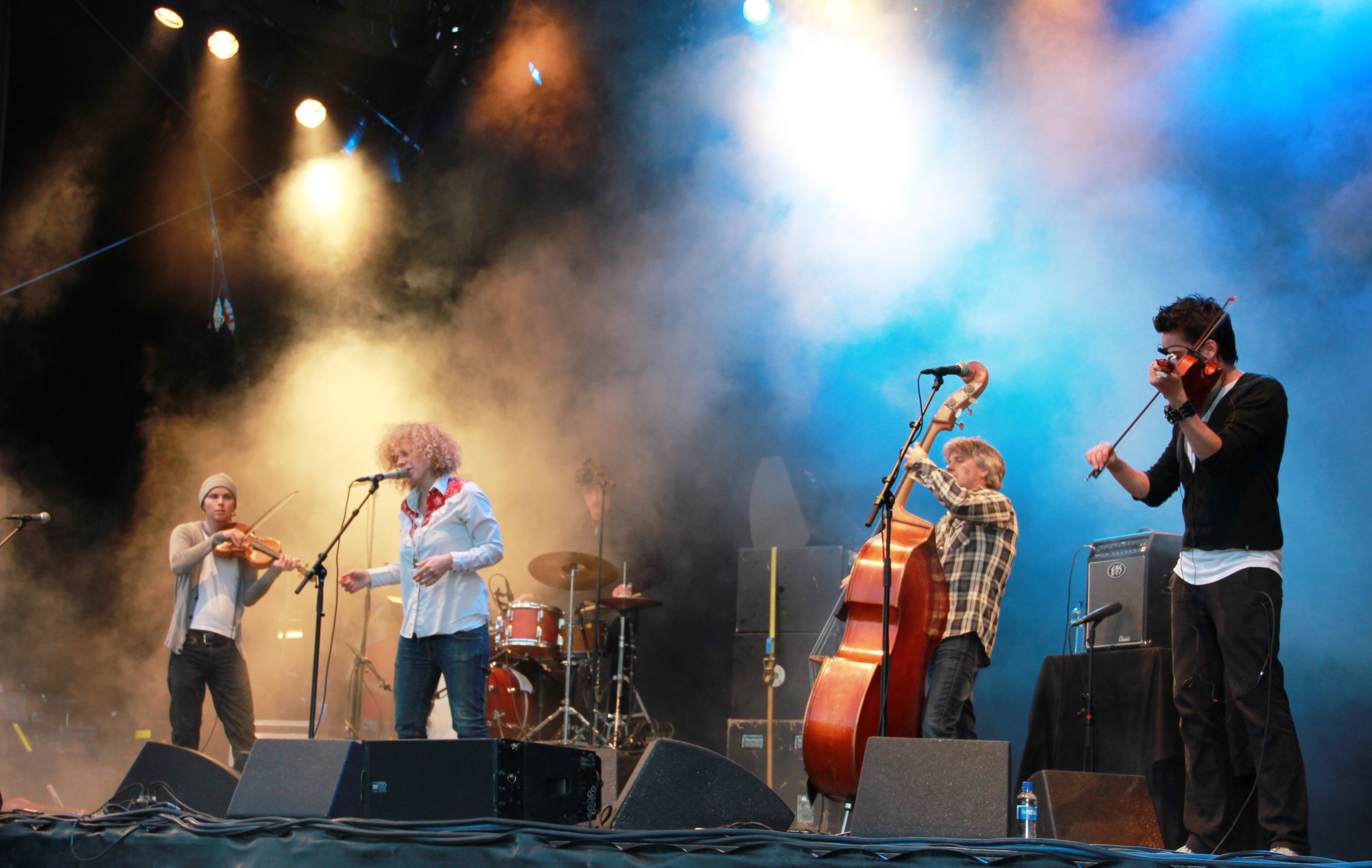
- Valkyrien Allstars during GranittRock 2010 (photo by Chell Hill)

Background information
- Origin: Oslo, Norway
- Genres: Norwegian traditional folk music, Folk rock
- Years active: 2003–present
- Labels: Heilo
- Members: Tuva Syvertsen; Erik Sollid
- Past members: Ola Hilmen
- Website: valkyrien.live

Valkyrien Allstars (established 2003 in Oslo, Norway) is a Norwegian Hardingfele trio whose music is based on Norwegian traditional folk music. They present many different genres and styles with a distinctive sound.

In 2006 Valkyrien Allstars was awarded Grappa's Debutant prize and received a recording contract under the direction of Grappa Music Publishing. Their debut album, Valkyrien Allstars, was released 1 October 2007 on the label Heilo. The band was nominated for Spellemannprisen 2007 in the open class Newcomer of the Year, and the album gained platinum album status in 2008. On 31 August 2009 they released their second album, To Måner, and the third, Ingen Hverdag, in 2011, all under the Heilo label.

== Band members ==
Standard lineup

- Tuva Syvertsen (Vocals, Hardingfele, Accordion)
- Erik Sollid (Vocals, Hardingfele, Tenor guitar, Mandolin)

Additional musicians

- Magnus Larsen (Double bass)
- Martin Langlie (Drums)

Former members

- Ola Hilmen (Hardingfele)

== Honors ==
- Gammleng-prisen 2012 in the category Traditional folk music

== Discography ==
- 2007: Valkyrien Allstars (Heilo)
- 2009: To måner (Heilo)
- 2011: ingen hverdag (Heilo)
- 2014: farvel slekt og venner (Heilo)
- 2016: Prøv å si noe til meg nå (Heilo) (under the name Valkyrien)
- 2020: Slutte og byne (Heilo)
- 2025: venter på noen som venter på noen (Supertraditional Records)

Preceded by Eli Storbekken	Recipient of the Traditional folk music Gammleng-prisen; 2012	Succeeded by Odd Nordstoga
