= Annbjørg Lien =

Norwegian musician

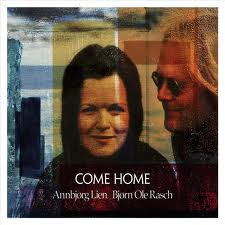

Background information
- Born: 15 October 1971 (age 54); Ålesund, Sunnmøre, Norway
- Origin: Mauseidvåg
- Genres: Traditional
- Occupations: Musician; composer
- Instruments: Fiddle; violin; nyckelharpa; Hardingfele; voice
- Website: annbjorglien.com

Annbjørg Lien (born 15 October 1971) is a Norwegian musician, playing the hardingfele (Hardanger fiddle), violin, and nyckelharpa.

== Career ==
She first came to national prominence in 1986. Shortly afterwards got a recording deal with the Heilo label and released her first album on that label in 1988. She has received numerous awards, both in Norway and the Nordic countries, including the Gammleng Prize in classical folk music in 2004 and the Hilmar Prize in 2006.

In her work, Lien often combines traditional Norwegian music with jazz and rock music. She has traveled to Africa, Asia, Australia, Argentina, Bhutan, Greenland, Iceland, Sri Lanka, North America, and other parts of Europe, and worked with musicians from many countries. In 2006 she performed on Loreena McKennitt's album An Ancient Muse playing nyckelharpa, and in 2008 she played Hardanger fiddle on Mairéad Ní Mhaonaigh's album Imeall.

Her 2008 project Waltz With Me brought together American fiddler, guitarist and singer Bruce Molsky, Swedish violist Mikael Marin and Canadian cellist Christine Hanson for a concert commissioned by the Telemark Festival. The project included a CD of the same name. With Arve Moen Bergset, Bjørn Ole Rasch and Steinar Ofsdal, she is a member of the folk music group Bukkene Bruse.

Lien is part of the fiddle ensemble String Sisters, which formed in 2000 and consists of six string players from different countries, who released their début album Live in 2007.

== Personal life and education ==
She is married to keyboardist and professor Bjørn Ole Rasch.

In 2019 she received her PhD degree in hardingfele (Hardanger fiddle games) from the University of Agder. She has no other academic education and learned fiddle games straight from the masters.

== Honours ==
- Spellemannprisen 1993 in the class Traditional for the album Bukkene Bruse, within Bukkene Bruse
- Gammleng-prisen 2004 in the class Traditional folk music
- Hilmar Prize 2006

== Discography ==
=== Solo albums ===
- 1983: Eg Er Liten Eg, Men Eg Vågar Meg (Grappa Music)
- 1988: Kjellstadslåttar (Grappa Music)
- 1989: Annbjørg (Kirkelig Kulturverksted)
- 1994: Felefeber (Grappa Music)
- 1996: Prisme (Grappa Music)
- 1999: Baba Yaga (Grappa Music)
- 2002: Aliens Alive (Grappa Music)
- 2005 Emma (Agder Theatre Music) with Bjørn Ole Rasch
- 2008: Waltz With Me (Grappa Music)
- 2009: Come Home (Grappa Music), with Bjørn Ole Rasch
- 2010: Alle Vegne (Kirkelig Kulturverksted), with Sondre Bratland
- 2012: Khoom Loy (Grappa Music)
- 2015: Drifting Like A Bird (Heilo Music)
- 2022: Janus

=== Collaborative works ===
Within Bukkene Bruse

- 1993: Bukkene Bruse
- 1995: Åre (Grappa Music)
- 1998: Steinstolen (Grappa Music)
- 2001: Den Fagraste Rosa
- 2004: Spel

With others

- 1987: I Seierstakt (Celebration)
- 2007: String Sisters Live (Grappa Music)
- 2010: Abocurragh, with Andy Irvine
- 2011: Beginner's Guide to Scandinavia (3-CD box set), with various artists
- 2012 Nordic Woman with various artists released by Fuuse Mousiqi/Grappa Music
