= Susanne Lundeng =

- Born: Susanne Merethe Lundeng; 18 August 1969 (age 56); Bodø, Nordland
- Origin: Norway
- Genres: Traditional
- Occupations: Musician, composer
- Instruments: Fiddle, violin, nyckelharpa
- Website: www.susannelundeng.no

Susanne Merethe Lundeng (born 18 August 1969 in Bodø, Norway) is a Norwegian traditional folk musician (fiddle) and composer.

== Career ==
Lundeng had Arvid Engegård as violin teacher and is a prominent practitioner of north Norwegian folk music. She has collaborated with Halvdan Sivertsen and later Sinikka Langeland (2005), among others. In the Midnight Sun Trio she collaborates with Knut Erik Sundquist (bass) and Arvid Engegård (violin). Within S.L. Band she collaborated with Bjørn Andor Drage (piano), Håvar Bendiksen (guitar and accordion), Trond-Viggo Solås (bass) and Arnfinn Bergrabb (percussion). Lundeng got in contact with old fiddlers in Salten, Lofoten at an early stage and she has undoubtedly contributed to the preservation of the Nordland traditional folk heritage.

Initially, Lunden was primarily a promoter of traditional folk music from Nordland, but over the years, she has shifted more towards performing the music she composes herself. However, the core of Nordland folk music remains in most of her compositions. At the same time, she draws inspiration from jazz, contemporary music, and folk traditions from other countries.

== Discography ==
=== Solo albums ===
- 1991: Havella(Heilo), slåtter from Nordland
- 1994: Drag (Kirkelig Kulturverksted)
- 1997: Ættesyn (Kirkelig Kulturverksted), with some of her own compositions and traditional folk music from Nordland
- 2000: Vals Til Den Røde Fela (Kirkelig Kulturverksted), with her own compositions
- 2004: Forunderlig Ferd (Kirkelig Kulturverksted), with her own compositions as well as some traditional works
- 2006: Nattevåk (Kirkelig Kulturverksted), with her own compositions
- 2011: Mot (Kirkelig Kulturverksted), with her own compositions as well as the contemporary works "Imella" by Rolf Wallin
- 2015: Nordalsslotter - Hilsen Susanne Lundeng (Havella Records)

=== Collaborations ===
- 1994: Sweet Sunny North: Henry Kaiser And David Lindley In Norway (Shanachie)
- 1996: Sweet Sunny North, Vol. 2 (Shanachie)
- 1996: Norske Turdansar II, frå Agder og Nord-Norge (Heilo), with Ånon-Egeland
- 2004: Aejlies Gaaltije (Vuelie), with Frode Fjellheim
- 2011: Rolf Wallin: Wire and String (Simax Classics)
- 2013: Flåte (Norway Music), with Hammer & Hersk (Arild Hammero & Daniel Herskedal)

== Honors ==
- 1985: Bodø Municipality cultural grant
- 1988: Won class B at Landskappleiken in Bø, Telemark
- 1990: Nordlandsposten's Kulturstipend
- 1992: Hilmar Alexandersen's Musikkpris
- 1992: Nordland municipal cultural grant
- 1992–94: Stipendiat by Ole Bull Academy at Voss
- 1994–96: Statens arbeidsstipend
- 1996: Ole Vig-prisen
- 1996: Mackølets Venners Kulturpris
- 1997: Norsk Folkemusikkfonds Folkemusikkpris for 1996
- 2000: Draugen-prisen
- 2000: Gammleng-prisen in Open class
- 2004: The European folk art award, the Alfred Töpfer Stiftung
- 2005: Nordlysprisen
- 2013: Council of traditional folk music and dance (Rff) award

Awards
Preceded by Steinar Ofsdal	Recipient of the Open class Gammleng-prisen; 2000	Succeeded by Ketil Bjørnstad
Preceded by Ola Bremnes	Recipient of the Nordlysprisen; 2005	Succeeded by Jan Gunnar Hoff
