= Waltz with Me =

Aliens Alive

Live album by Annbjørg Lien
- Released: September 9, 2008
- Recorded: Kongshavn Studios in Kristiansand, Norway 2007
- Genre: Traditional folk music
- Length: 47:12
- Label: Grappa Music
- Producer: Annbjørg Lien

Annbjørg Lien chronology
Aliens Alive (2002)	Aliens Alive (2008)	Come Home (2009)

Waltz With Me (released September 9, 2008, on the Heilo catalog by the Grappa label – HCD 7216) is a live album by Annbjørg Lien.

Professional ratings
Review scores
Source	Rating
Allmusic	4/5 stars
Dagbladet	4/6 stars

== Review ==
Telemarkfestivalen 2007 presented the world artist and folk musician Annbjørg Lien as this year's festival composer. Here Lien performed together with an international folk music string quartet comprising Annbjørg Lien (hardingfele and fiddle), Bruce Molsky (fiddle & vocals), Christine Hanson (cello) and Mikael Marin (viola), a completely originally written commission, Waltz With Me, based on a folk musical expression, rooted in Northern Europe and North America. The free events reflects crossover and playfulness.

== Reception ==
The Allmusic reviewer Chris Nickson awarded the album 4 stars, and the review by Anders Grønneberg of the Norwegian newspaper Dagbladet awarded the album dice 4.

== Track listing ==
1. «The Traveller» (5:33)
2. «Sula Mountain» (4:52)
3. «The Fiddle» (4:09)
4. «Home East» (6:16)
5. «Masques» (4:53)
6. «Waltz With Me» (2:46)
7. «Walking Strings» (4:56)
8. «Dancing The Years All Away» (4:28)
9. «The Old Car» (3:46)
10. «Mother and a Son» (5:02)

== Personnel ==
- Annbjørg Lien – Hardingfele & fiddle
- Bruce Molsky – fiddle, vocals, Haringfele & guitar
- Mikael Marin – viola
- Christine Hanson – cello
- Kirsten Braten Berg – vocals & zither

== Credits ==
- Arrangers – Annbjørg Lien, Bruce Molsky, Christine Hanson & Mikael Marin
- Morten Lund – mastering
- Recording & mixing – Trond Engebretsen
- Composer & producer – Annbjørg Lien
- Designer – Rune Mortensen

== Notes ==
- Recorded and mixed at Kongshavn Studios in Kristiansand, Norway 2007
