= Looking on Darkness =

Looking on Darkness is the debut CD of accordionist Frode Haltli, released on ECM New Series in 2002. The CD received a 'Norwegian Grammy' (Spellemannprisen) in the category Contemporary Music, as well as the French 'Prix Gus Viseur 2003'. In addition to Haltli the CD features the Vertavo String Quartet on one of the tracks. The CD is produced by Manfred Eicher.

== Track listing ==
- Bent Sørensen: Looking on Darkness (2000)
- PerMagnus Lindborg: Bombastic SonoSofisms (1996)
- Maja Solveig Kjelstrup Ratkje: gagaku variations, for accordion and string quartet (2001)
- Magnus Lindberg: Jeux d'anches (1990)
- Asbjørn Schaathun: Lament (2000)
