= Hekla Stålstrenga =

Norwegian folk band

- Origin: Norway
- Genres: Folk, folk/rock
- Years active: 2008-present
- Labels: Ta:lik
- Members: Anne Nymo Trulsen; Ragnhild Furebotten; Tore Bruvoll; Trond-Viggo Solas; Ole-Jakob Larsen

Hekla Stålstrenga is a Norwegian folk and folk rock band specializing in North Norwegian traditional music. It was formed in 2008 as a duo by fiddler Ragnhild Furebotten and guitarist Tore Bruvoll. They had their first recording as a duo, for which they were nominated during Spellemannprisen, the Norwegian Grammies, for "Best folk music band". They later on added lead vocalist Anne Nymo Trulsen, drummer Ole-Jakob Larsen and acoustic bassist Trond-Viggo Solas to become a five-member band.

The band was nominated for another Spellemannprisen in 2011 after release of their album Makramé. The album charted in VG-lista, the official Norwegian Albums Chart. It was released on the local Ta:lik label to which the band is signed to. Makramé is a word deriving from Arabic meaning the art of tying strings to use or decorative purposes.

Besides their collaborations, various artists in the band are developing their own solo careers. Lead vocalist Anne Nymo Trulsen released her own debut album Skråblikk in 2013.

== Band members ==
- Anne Nymo Trulsen - lead vocals
- Ragnhild Furebotten - fiddle
- Tore Bruvoll - guitar
- Trond-Viggo Solas - bass
- Ole-Jakob Larsen - drums

== Honors ==
- In 2008, as the duo Hekla Stålstrenga, the duo members Ragnhild Furebotten and Tore Bruvoll were nominated for "Best Folk music/gammaldans" category for their work during the Spellemannprisen, the Norwegian Grammies.
- In 2011, they were nominated for "Best Folk music / traditional music" category during Spellemannprisen.

== Discography ==
=== Albums ===
Year	Album	Peak positions	Notes
Year	Album	NOR	Notes
2011	Makramé: Date released: 2011; Record label: Ta:lik	29	Tracklist: 1. "Erter og sverter" (2:54); 2. "Er det sant" (4:07); 3. "Frans Kafka" (3:29); 4. "Har du fyr" (4:16); 5. "Farvel" (3:24); 6. "Mannen og kona" (3:55); 7. "Svabo" (3:39); 8. "How far is it long" (4:00); 9. "Den narrede jomfru" (3:18); 10. "A i sløyd" (4:11); 11. "Siste sang" (1:58)
2013	Dyrandé: Date released: 2013; Record label: Ta:lik	28	Tracklist: 1. "Syvogtredve fem" (3:10); 2. "Båtbygger Jo" (2:50); 3. "Myklebusten" (3:22); 4. "Folketonen" (4:01); 5. "Vintersang" (3:33); 6. "I midten" (3:40); 7. "Sjømannsbrud" (4:27); 8. "Hjerterdame" (2:39); 9. "Dyrandé" (3:02); 10. "Tusen tanker" (5:28); 11. "Vise ved vintersolkverv" (3:37)
2016	Ventetid: Date released: 2016; Record label: Ta:lik		Tracklist: 1. "Vingeslag"; 2. "En time for sent" 3. "Min elsk" 4. "Du e henta" 5. "Barn som spør" 6. "Akk o ve" 7. "Stille vals" 8. "Barnesong"; 9. "Vinter"; 10. "Kom te meg" 11. "Ventetid"; 12. "Sang ved sengetid" 13. "Barnesang Coda"
2017	Velkommen inn: Date released: 2017; Record label: Ta:lik	7	Tracklist: 1. "Nordnorsk julesalme" 2. "Fra fjord og fjære" 3. "Det lyser i stille grender" 4. "Julekvelden"; 5. "Et juleeventyr" 6. "Heim til jul" 7. "Velkommen inn" 8. "Josefs julevise" 9. "Stille som sne" 10. "Desember"; 11. "Stille natt"

=== Singles ===
- "Folketonen" 2012
- "Båtbygger Jo" 2013
