= Jon Anders Halvorsen =

Norwegian folk singer and physician (born 1968)

- Born: 1968 (age 57–58); Lunde, Telemark, Norway
- Genres: Traditional
- Occupation: Musician
- Instruments: Kveder, fiddler
- Label: Ta:lik
- Website: Jon Anders Halvorsen on Myspace

Jon Anders Halvorsen (born 1968 in Lunde, Norway) is a Norwegian folk singer and physician.

== Career ==
Halvorsen is a graduate of the Ole Bull Academy at Vossavangen (1998–2000) and won the prize for best vocal performer at Landskappleiken in 2002. Halvorsen is a connoisseur of the "kvede" tradition in Telemark. He collaborated with guitarist Tore Bruvoll as the character of Prins Sveinung (Tamino) in the folk music production of the opera The Magic Flute (2005–2006), by Rikskonsertene and quinces group Dvergmål. Halvorsen and Bruvoll were awarded the Folkelarmpris in 2007, in the class Innovative/Experimental. In 2012 he was nominated for the Folkelarmpris for the album Komme No Heim.

Halvorsen earned a master's degree in medicine from the University of Oslo in 1996 and has worked as a physician at Telemark Sentralsjukehus, Lenvik Kommune, Oslo Legevakt, Ullevål Universitetssykehus, St. Mary's Hospital (London), and Rikshospitalet. He specializes in skin diseases and earned a PhD in medical sciences from the University of Oslo in 2011. http://www.med.uio.no/klinmed/personer/vit/jonahalv/

== Honors ==
- 1996: Nominated for the Spellemannprisen for the album Visor Og Kvæde Frå Blåberglandet
- 1998: Sagaprisen
- 2004–2005: Statens Kunstnerstipend
- 2005: Nominated for the Folkelarmprisen for the album Gåtesong
- 2007: Folkelarmprisen in the class Innovative for the album Trillar For To

== Discography ==
=== Solo albums ===
- 2012: Komme No Heim (Etnisk Musikklubb)

=== Collaborations ===
Within Dvergmål

- 1996: Visor Og Kvæde Frå Blåberglandet (Grappa)
- 2004: Song i himmelsalar (Heilo)

With Tore Bruvoll

- 2004: Nattsang (Heilo)
- 2007: Trillar For To (Heilo)

With Ingvill Marit Buen Garnås

- 2005: Gåtesong (Etnisk Musikklubb)

With other projects

- 2006: Juledrøm (MFC)
- 2006: Jul i Svingen (NRK/Universal)
