= Erik Dæhlin =

Norwegian composer and performance artist

Erik Schwensen Dæhlin (born 14 July 1976 in Oslo) is a Norwegian composer and performance artist.

Dæhlin studied percussion at the University of Tromsø, at the Oslo National Academy of the Arts as well as composition at the Norwegian Academy of Music under the tutorship of Olav Anton Thommessen, Asbjørn Schaathun and Henrik Hellstenius. Dæhlin graduated in 2006 and has been active as a composer since 1997.

As a percussionist, Dæhlin has been a member of a number of ensembles including NING and Puls as well as the performance project SPLOING. Throughout his career as a composer, Dæhlin has maintained a focus on instrumental and musical theatre genres, where the player’s performativity is played out in and beyond the musical material, and in the context of the performance mold used. Key Dæhlin works in this context include Our Picture is Continuous Fractions, Bildebeskrivelse, On Return to Scale, Desiring Machines, Absence is the Only Real and Forvandlinger.

Dæhlin’s list of works includes solo- and chamber music works in addition to electro-acoustic pieces for performers, ensembles and orchestral institutions including Karin Hellqvist, Håkon Stene, Ingfrid Breie Nyhus, the Norwegian Radio Orchestra, MiN Ensemblet, Oslo Camerata, Ensemble neoN, Liv Glaser, NING, Pinquins, BIT20 Ensemble and Oslo Sinfonietta. Internationally, his works have seen performances at the ISCM World Music Days in Hong Kong, Nordic Music Days and at a number of European events.

== Production ==
=== Selected works ===
- From the Hinterland Archives (2017)
- Vortex Room - a concert installation (2015)
- The Escape Goat - for guitar duo (2015)
- Avstandsriss - an archive project with Ingfrid Breie Nyhus (2014)
- Nasjonalcollage - anno 2014. For marching band and choir (2014)
- Absence is the Only Real - a concert installation with Håkon Stene (2014)
- Portraits - a serie of shorter pieces for chamber ensemble and sound (2014 -)
- Desiring machines : An experimental opera for singer/performer, cello, piano, percussion, video, sound and live-electronics (2013)
- This Time is Different (2012)
- on transposing distance (2012)
- Double Portrait of Erika (2010)
- fembot bacchanale (2010)
- Disparate Scenes : For chamber ensemble of eight instruments and electronics (2009)
- Singing on a Bench : solo viola (2009)
- Saturation is that : For ensemble and sound (2008)
- Klokkeklanger : Based on Edvard Grieg's "Klokkeklang" (2007)
- Reading The Lips Of Mr. M : Instananés No. 4 (2006)
- Mozart - Sinding, You & Me : For 13 instrumentalists (2006)
- Head On (2006)
- Traces et Instantanés (1998-2005)
- Triptych For Radio (2005)
- Seul Prés Du Passage (1999/2005)
- Chyth : Micromelodrama (2004)
- Passage Barré : For flutist/performer and electronics (2004)

=== Discography ===
- Ning Trio, Works by Barrett, Hagen, Buene, Aagaard-Nilsen, Apollyon (2004)
