= Håkon Thelin =

Norwegian double bass player and composer

Håkon Thelin (born 1976 in Oslo) is a Norwegian double bass player and composer.

Thelin holds a master's degree (with a study on percussion techniques on the double bass in modern music, 2003) from the Norwegian Academy of Music. From 2007 to 2011, he worked as an artistic research fellow at the Norwegian Academy of Music with the project A new world of sounds - advancements in contemporary double bass techniques. Thelin is currently Associate Professor at the Norwegian Academy of Music where he is teaching subjects on composition and improvisation, as well as giving lessons in contemporary double bass.

He has released several solo albums and won the Spellemannprisen 2011 in the contemporary music category for his second album Light. He has also recorded a duo album with Stefano Scodanibbio and a tribute CD to Scodanibbio together with bass players like Mark Dresser, Sebastian Gramms, Jöelle Léandre and Barre Phillips.Together with saxophonist Rolf-Erik Nystrøm and accordionist Frode Haltli, Håkon forms Poing, an ensemble which, since they started playing together in 1999, have been one of the leading ensembles for contemporary music in Scandinavia.

== Discography ==
- 2002: Oslo Sinfonietta "Eivind Buene: Objects Of Desire" (Albedo)
- 2003: Jono el Grande "fevergreens" (Rune Grammofon)
- 2003: POING "Giants of Jazz" (TLRR)
- 2004: Håkon Thelin "a p)reference to other things" (Albedo)
- 2005: Ensemble Ernst "Bad language" (Aurora)
- 2005: POING "Planet POING" (Jazzaway)
- 2007: Eivind Buene "Asymmetrical Music" (Sofa)
- 2011: Håkon Thelin "Light" (Atterklang)
- 2011: POING+Maja S. K. Ratkje "Wach Auf" (Øra Fonogram)
- 2012: Ensemble Modern "Bartók/Eötvös/Ligeti" (Naïve)
- 2012: Ensemble Modern "Arnulf Herrmann: Wasser" (EM Medien)
- 2013: Unni Løvlid "Lux" (Heilo/Grappa)
- 2014: Telemark Chamber Orchestra and POING "Thommessen/Bibalo" (Fabra)
- 2014: Håkon Thelin/Stefano Scodanibbio "a Stefano Scodanibbio" (Atterklang)
- 2014: Saar Berger "Traveling Pieces" (EM Medien)
- 2014: Sebastian Gramms/various artists "Thinking of Stefano Scodanibbio" (Wergo)
- 2014: POING, Per Oddvar Johansen, The Norwegian Wind Ensemble "Eivind Buene: Into the Void" (LAWO Classics)
- 2015: Håkon Thelin "Folk" (Atterklang)

== Works ==
- Aleatüde (solo oboe, 1998)
- Heartbreak Motel/a dog named garage (double bass, percussion 2003-2004)
- Amarcord (solo double bass, 2002-2003)
- oibbinadocS (solo double bass, 2003-2004)
- Menuet in C (string trio, percussion, 2004)
- Sonate in B: Allegro - Andante (double bass, percussion 2004)
- Lost in translation (solo saxophone, 2005)
- oibbinadocS (version for violin and double bass, 2008)
- Shared moments (double bass, tape, 2008)
- Light (double bass, violin, 2008-2009)
- Glasperlenspiel (double bass, vocal tenor, 2009-2010)
- Kárma (double bass and 4 female voices, 2010)
- Føn (solo double bass, 2012)
- El bajo cantaor (solo double bass, 2012)
- Melodía de los sueños (double bass, horn, 2012)
- Tablón-Táctil-Pulsar-Sonar (solo double bass 2012)
- Melodía (solo en el sueño) (solo double bass, 2012)
- Solen (string quartet, 2013)
- h-moll (double bass, folksinger, 2014)
- si minore/re maggiore (solo double bass, 2014)
- Maltstein-suiten (double bass, cello, 2014)
- Kristiania (solo double bass, 2014)
- Draumkvedet - vil du meg lye (folk singer, double bass, electroacoustic sound and video, 2015)
