= Brita Bratland =

Norwegian singer (1910–1975)

- Born: 12 October 1910; Vinje Municipality, Norway
- Died: 24 August 1975 (aged 64)
- Occupation: folk singer

Brita Bratland (12 October 1910 – 24 August 1975) was a Norwegian folk singer. She was born in Vinje Municipality, and was granddaughter of folk singer Margit Tveiten, and great-granddaughter of traditional singer Halvor Gugarden (1792–1879).

Bratland learned most of her song repertoire from her grandmother during her childhood. She recorded 167 songs for the Norwegian Broadcasting Corporation, starting from 1958. She is regarded as an important source for traditional songs from Vest-Telemark. Among singers inspired by her are Agnes Buen Garnås, Ellen Nordstoga, Kirsten Bråten Berg and Arve Moen Bergset.
