= Ragnhild Furebotten =

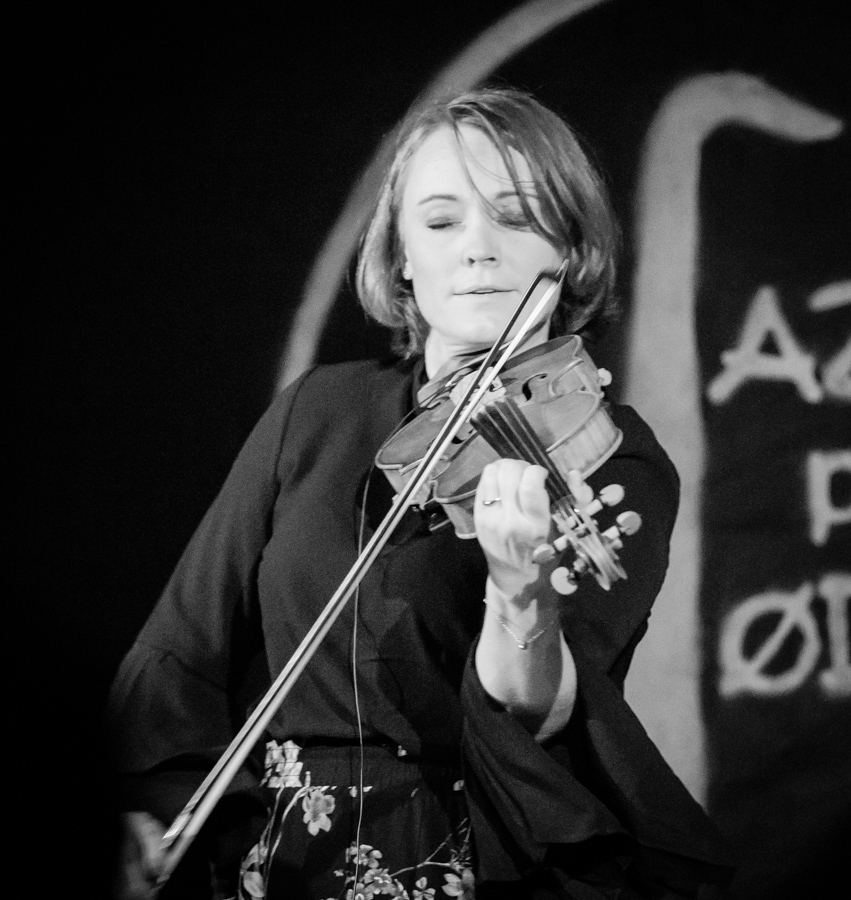
- Furebotten in 2017

Background information
- Born: 10 March 1979 (age 47); Saltdal, Nordland
- Origin: Norway
- Genres: Traditional, folk rock
- Occupations: Musician, composer
- Instruments: Fiddle, violin, vocals
- Label: Ta:lik
- Website: furebotten.com

Ragnhild Furebotten (born 10 March 1979 in Saltdal, Norway) is a Norwegian fiddler, folk musician and composer, and former member of the traditional folk band Majorstuen and present member and founder of Hekla Stålstrenga.

== Career ==
Furebotten picked up the fiddle at the age of six, and started her formal musical studies when she attended the music program at Kongsbakken Videregående Skole in Tromsø, at the age of 16, earning her Examen artium in 1998. This is where she first came into contact with guitarist Tore Bruvoll, with whom she has collaborated since. Later she joined Bruvoll at the Telemark University College (1998–2000). Furebotten received her diploma from the Norwegian Academy of Music (2000–2004), and during her studies she was an exchange student at the Fyn Conservatory of Music in Odense, Denmark and there she studied under the guidance of Danish fiddler Harald Haugaard, among others. Now residing in Målselv, she works as Regional Musician of Culture in Troms (2013), besides being a freelance musician.

Furebotten is a mediator of the Northern Norwegian slåttemateriale (traditional Norwegian fiddle music), a tradition she knows well, and interprets and expresses in a completely new and modern way. She is also a fiddler in the Northern Norwegian traditional folk music band Hekla Stålstrenga (established in 2005) who were Ungkunstnere (young artists) at the Festival of North Norway in 2006 as well as being awarded the Arvid Hanssen award for young artists. The Norwegian folk music trio Fotefar was also established in 2005. In the summer of 2007 she made the commissioned work Fot for the festival Kalottspel, and was soloist for the project Arctic Subcircle in 2008.

Furebotten has released a series of albums with different musical constellations. In the band Majorstuen she was awarded the Spellemannprisen in 2003 for the best traditional folk album of the year for the debut album Majorstuen. She also participated on the albums Jorun Jogga (2004) and Juledrøm (2006) until she left the band. They became the first Norwegian folk music band to receive the official showcase at WOMEX world music trade fair in 2007. The same year she released her debut solo album Endelig Vals as part of the Ragnhild Furebotten Trio, including Frode Haltli and Gjermund Larsen. In 2008 she released the album Hekla stålstrenga together with Tore Bruvoll. Both albums were nominated for the Spellemannprisen in the class traditional folk and traditional dance music. For the solo album Never on a Sunday (2011) Furebotten was awarded the 2011 Spellemannprisen in the class Traditional folk/traditional dance music, and in 2013 she appeared at the Oslo World Music Festival.

== Honors ==
- 2004: Spellemannprisen in the class Traditional folk for the album Majorstuen, as part of the band Majorstuen
- 2005: Intro-folk award in the band Majorstuen
- 2006: Arvid Hanssen award for young artists
- 2006: Ungkunstnere at the Music Festival of Northern Norway in the band Hekla stålstrenga
- 2011: Spellemannprisen in the class Traditional folk/traditional dance music for the album Never on a Sunday

== Discography ==
=== Solo albums ===
As part of Ragnhild Furebotten Trio:

- 2007: Endelig vals (Ta:lik Records), as part of the Ragnhild Furebotten Trio including Frode Haltli and Gjermund Larsen

Duo with Tore Bruvoll:

- 2008: Hekla Stålstrenga (Ta:lik), nominated for the Spellemannprisen 2008

With Helge Sunde, Anders Eriksson, Marius Haltli, Frode Nymo, Torben Snekkestad and Lars Andreas Haug:

- 2011: Never on a Sunday (Ta:lik Records)

=== Collaborations ===
As part of Majorstuen including:

- 2002: Majorstuen (2L Records)
- 2004: Jorun Jogga
- 2006: Juledrøm

As part of the trio Fotefar including Lena Jinnegren and Bendik Lund Haanshus:

- 2009: Fest (Kirkelig Kulturverksted), featuring Håvard Lund

As part of Hekla Stålstrenga:

- 2011: Makramé (Ta:lik), nominated for the Spellemannprisen 2011
- 2013: Dyrandé (Ta:lik)

With others:

- 2002: Klassisk Kalvik (DaWorks), with Finn Kalvik

With Brynjar Rasmussen:

- 2011: Arctic Mood (Nordnorsk Jazzsenter, Finito Bacalao Records)
