= Ingfrid Breie Nyhus =

- Born: 26 September 1978 (age 47); Oslo, Norway
- Origin: Norway
- Occupation: Pianist
- Instrument: Piano
- Labels: LabLabel, Simax, Heilo

Ingfrid Breie Nyhus (born 26 September 1978) is a Norwegian pianist, the daughter of fiddler Sven Nyhus.

== Career ==
Ingfrid Breie Nyhus plays and creates folk, contemporary and classical music on the piano. She studied piano at Norwegian Academy of Music, Sibelius Academy in Helsinki and Hochschule für Musik und Theater Hannover. In 1999 she won the Ungdommens Pianomesterskap (The Norwegian Youth piano championship] and also received the award for her interpretation of Geirr Tveitt. In 2005 she was the first recipient of Den norske solistpris (The Norwegian Soloist Award) when it was awarded for the first time during the Festspillene i Bergen. Together with her father and sister she released the album Tre Nyhus (2005). In 2007 she released the album Edvard Grieg: Slåtter Opus 72, together with her sister, performed with piano and Hardanger fiddle. The album was nominated for 2007 Spellemannprisen in the category Classical music.

In 2015, she released the album Slåttepiano: her own piano music based on traditional Hardanger fiddle music. In 2021 Slåttepiano II was released. Both were nominated for Folkelarmprisen, the latter was also nominated for Spellemannprisen's composer award, and won "Work of the Year" by the Norwegian Society of Composers. The collaboration Unamna (2022) with vocalist Unni Løvlid and fiddler Anne Hytta won the Spellemannprisen award for contemporary music.

Ingfrid Breie Nyhus has performed at concert series and festivals in Norway and Europe within folk, classical, jazz and contemporary genres. She is professor at the Norwegian Academy of Music.

== Honors ==
- 2005: Den norske solistpris (The Norwegian Soloist Award)
- 2022: Årets verk, Komponistforeningen (Work of the Year, the Norwegian Society of Composers)
- 2023: Spellemannprisen, Unamna

== Discography ==
=== Solo albums ===
- 2015: Abstraction in Folk Art (LabLabel)
- 2015: Stille-stykkje (LabLabel)
- 2015: Slåttepiano (LabLabel)
- 2021: Slåttepiano II (LabLabel)
- 2026: Silkegul - Slåttepiano III (LabLabel)

=== Collaborations ===
With Sven Nyhus and Åshild Breie Nyhus

- 2005: Tre Nyhus (Heilo)

With Åshild Breie Nyhus

- 2007: Edvard Grieg: Slåtter Opus 72 (Simax)
- 2016: Hardanger Fiddle in Art Music (Simax)

With Eir Inderhaug and others, music composed by Bjørn Kruse

- 2016: Portrait With Hidden Face (LabLabel)

With Terje Isungset

- 2021: Kløsterkoraler (LabLabel)

With Unni Løvlid and Anne Hytta

- 2022: Unamna (Grappa)

With Live Maria Roggen

- 2021: Demanten (LabLabel)
- 2023: Skymt (LabLabel)

With Live Maria Roggen and Morten Qvenild

- 2024: Symfoni (LabLabel)

With Erik Dæhlin

- 2026: Mellom (LabLabel)

=== Contributions ===
- 2022: Opphav with Sander Tingstad
- 2018: Donaueschinger Musiktage 2018 composed by Agata Zubel
- 2017: Life Music composed by Helge Iberg
- 2008: But a Machine composed by Knut Olaf Sunde
