= Steinar Ofsdal =

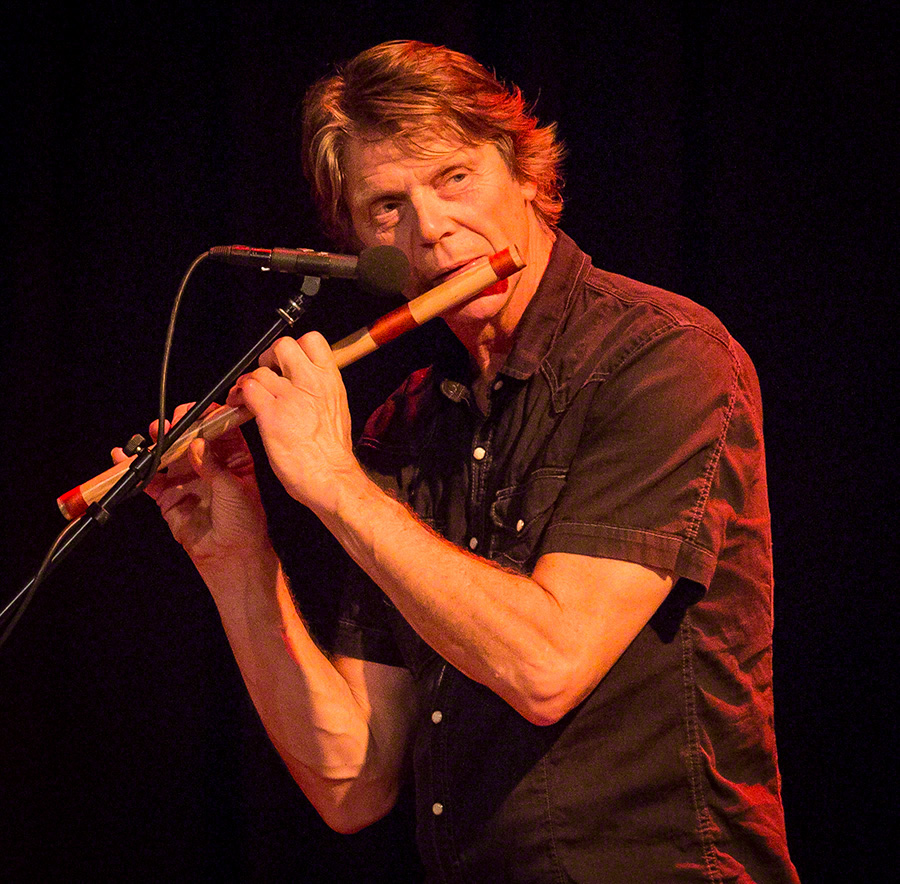
- Steinar Ofsdal in concert, 2016

Background information
- Born: 4 October 1948 (age 77); Oslo, Norway
- Genres: Jazz, folk
- Occupation: Musician
- Instrument: Flute
- Website: ofsdal.no

Steinar Ofsdal (born 4 October 1948) is a Norwegian composer and flutist.

== Career ==
Ofsdal has since 1967 performed on numerous stages in Norway, and worldwide in different settings. He has performed alone or within one of his many bands, and is also known as one of the members of the folk group Bukkene Bruse, including Annbjørg Lien, Arve Moen Bergset and Bjørn Ole Rasch. He has written several compositions for his own concert use, and music for theater, film, television and radio.

Ofsdal won the Spellemannprisen 1983 in the Open class for the album Hat Trick and Spellemannprisen 1989 with Per Midtstigen in the class Folk / Old Norwegian Folk Dance for the album Sjøfløyta. Bukkene Bruse was awarded Spellemannprisen 1993 in the class Children's music. He was also awarded Gammleng-prisen 1999 in open class and was nominated for Edvard Prize 2005, in the class Traditional folk music. In 2009 he was twice winner of the championship in folk music (Landskappleiken Geilo) in sjøfløyte (sea flute) and seljefløyte (willow flute), and he received Egil Storbekkens Music Prize for 2009, and is Professor of music at the Norges Musikkhøgskole and the Ole Bull Academy in Norway.

== Awards and honors ==
- Spellemannprisen, traditional folk, Hat Trick, 1983
- Spellemannprisen with Per Midtstigen, traditional folk/Norwegian folk dance, 1989
- Gammleng-prisen, Open, 1999
- Egil Storbekkens Music Prize, 2009
- Landskappleiken winner at Geilo, 2009

== Discography ==
=== As leader ===
- Floytesprell (Plateselskapet Mai, 1978)
- Hat Trick (Hot Line, 1984)
- Reisefeber (Slager, 1985)
- Kalender (Slager, 1987)
- Vestenfor Mane (Slager, 1989)
- Sjofloyta (Slager, 1995)
- Aw/Ofsdal/Sereba/Kake (Etnisk Musikklubb, 2004)

=== As sideman ===
With Sigmund Groven

- Motlys (Polydor, 1979)
- Colour Slides (NOPA, 1985)
- Nattonsker (Sonet, 1991)

With Lars Klevstrand

- Twostep & Bla Ballader (Polydor, 1974)
- To I Spann (Plateselskapet Mai, 1979)
- Frie Hender (Plateselskapet Mai, 1981)

With Geirr Lystrup

- Grendevisur & Danselat (Plateselskapet Mai, 1977)
- Kom Sol Pa Alle Mine Berg (Sonet, 1981)
- Brakar & Joanna (Juni, 1993)
- Sangen Om Yebo (Juni, 2005)

With Lillebjorn Nilsen

- Portrett (Polydor, 1973)
- ...Og Fia Hadde Sko! (Polydor, 1974)
- Byen Med Det Store Hjertet (Polydor, 1975)
- Oslo 3 (NorDisc, 1979)
- Sanger (Grappa, 1988)
- Haba Haba (Grappa, 1995)

With others

- Stein Ove Berg, Nar Dagen Kommer (Talent, 1977)
- Marie Bergman, Hjartats Lust (Metronome, 1981)
- Jens Bolling, Forteller Norske Folkeeventyr (ABC Media, 1995)
- Benny Borg, Den Storste Reisen (Redbrick, 2016)
- Borknagar, Origin (Century Media, 2006)
- Sondre Bratland, Inn i draumen (Kirkelig Kulturverksted, 1988)
- Kari Bremnes & Lars Klevstrand, Tid A Hausta Inn (Pa Norsk, 1983)
- Bukkene Bruse, Are (Grappa, 1995)
- Knut Buen, Samspel (Buen Kulturverkstad 1995)
- Alf Cranner, Kafe Kaos (Tylden, 1995)
- Jan Eggum, Underveis (Grappa, 1991)
- Rita Eriksen, Hjerteslag (Big Box, 2008)
- Birgitte Grimstad, Posemannens Bil m.m.m. (Musica 1970)
- Birgitte Grimstad, Love Is a Flow (Fonix Musik, 1995)
- Eivind Groven, Som Symra Rein & Bla (Heilo, 1985)
- Sigmund Groven, Aria (Sonet, 1988)
- Randi Hansen, Hjerterdame (NorDisc, 1980)
- Randi Hansen, AE Undres (NorDisc, 1981)
- Trygve Henrik Hoff, Fokti... (RCA Victor 1980)
- Henry Kaiser & David Lindley, The Sweet Sunny North (Shanachie, 1994)
- Finn Kalvik, Nokkelen Ligger Under Matta (Polydor, 1974)
- Sverre Kjelsberg, Etter Morketia (Plateselskapet Mai, 1979)
- Sverre Kjelsberg, Kara Syster (Plateselskapet Mai, 1980)
- Teddy Nelson, Diggy Liggy (Triola, 1976)
- Langsomt Mot Nord, Westrveg (CBS 1988)
- Odd Nordstoga, Heim Te Mor (Sonet, 2006)
- Oyvind Rauset, 13 Umulige Danser + 1 Usannsynlig (Hot Club, 1988)
- Knut Reiersrud, Sub (Kirkelig Kulturverksted, 1999)
- Secret Garden, Dawn of a New Century (Mercury, 1999)
- Secret Garden, Dreamcatcher (Philips, 2000)
- Halvdan Sivertsen, Nordaforr (Plateselskapet Mai, 1979)
- Halvdan Sivertsen, Ny & Naken (Plateselskapet, 1987)
- Anita Skorgan, Julenatt (WEA, 1994)
- Stiftelsen, Kva Hjelp Det A Syngje (Polydor, 1974)
- Solvguttene, Solvguttene Synger Julen Inn (Universal, 2001)
- Kari Svendsen, Kari Svendsen (NorDisc, 1978)
- Kari Svendsen, Solskinn & Sang (Studio 1982)
- Jahn Teigen, Klovn Uten Scene (EMI, 1988)
- Lynni Treekrem, Ut I Vind (Columbia, 1991)
- Hege Tunaal & Lars Klevstrand, Dobbeltportrett (NorDisc, 1969)
- Vazelina Bilopphoggers, Hjulkalender (Universal/Opal 2000)
- Cornelis Vreeswijk, Turistens Klagan (Sonet, 1981)
- Cornelis Vreeswijk, Guldkorn Fran Master Cees Memoarer (Metronome, 1996)

Preceded by Karl Seglem	Recipient of the Gammleng-prisen Open class 1999	Succeeded by Susanne Lundeng
