= Åshild Breie Nyhus =

Norwegian musician (born 1975)

- Born: 27 September 1975 (age 49); Oslo
- Origin: Norway
- Genres: Classical, Traditional folk music
- Occupation: Pianist
- Instrument: Piano
- Labels: Simax, Heilo
- Website: breienyhus.no/portfolio/recordings

Åshild Breie Nyhus (born 27 January 1975 in Oslo, Norway) is a Norwegian musician (Hardanger fiddle, violin, viola and nyckelharpa) who plays folk music and classical music, the daughter of fiddler Sven Nyhus and the older sister of pianist Ingfrid Breie Nyhus.

== Career ==
Nyhus graduated from the Barratt Due Institute of Music and Norwegian Academy of Music. She is the daughter of folk musician Sven Nyhus and since the middle of the 1990s, was a member of his folk music orchestra, Sven Nyhus sekstett. From 1999, she was part of the Oslo-Filharmonien, first as first violinist, and later as third violaist. She later played in the Det Norske Kammerorkester. As a folk musician, she was soloist on Hardanger fiddle and nyckelharpa, with the Oslo-Filharmonien, Det Norske Kammerorkester, Norwegian Radio Orchestra and Trondheim Symphony Orchestra, among others.

Together with her father, Sven Nyhus, and her sister, Ingfrid Breie Nyhus on piano, she released the album Tre Nyhus on the Heilo label in 2005. In 2007, she and her sister released the album Edvard Grieg: Slåtter Opus 72 with works by Edvard Grieg recorded with piano and Hardanger fiddle. For this album she was nominated for the 2007 Spellemannprisen in the classical music category and won the 2008 Grieg Society Award.

== Honors ==
- 2008: Grieg Society Award

== Discography ==
With Sven Nyhus and Ingfrid Breie Nyhus

- 2005: Tre Nyhus (Heilo)

With Ingfrid Breie Nyhus

- 2007: Edvard Grieg: Slåtter Opus 72 (Simax)
