= Steinstolen =

Studio album by Bukkene Bruse
- Released: 1998
- Genre: Traditional folk music
- Length: 71:55
- Label: Grappa Music

Bukkene Bruse chronology
Åre (1996)	Steinstolen (1998)	Den Fagraste Rosa (2001)

Steinstolen (released 1998 by the label Heilo - HCD 7145) is the second album from Norwegian folk band Bukkene Bruse.

== Reception ==
Professional ratings
Review scores
Source	Rating
AllMusic	3/5 stars

AllMusic awarded the album 3 stars.

== Track listing ==
1. «Numedalshalling / Hailing From Numedal» (4:12)
  (Traditional)
2. «Min Gut / My Boy» (3:06)
  (Steinar Ofsdal / Lyrics: Stein Versto)
3. «Steinstolen / The Stone Chair» (2:19)
  (Traditional)
4. «Springar I Dur / Springar In A Major Key» (2:07)
  (Traditional)
5. «Folktone Fra Sunnmøre / Folk Tune From Sunnmere» (4:06)
  (Traditional / Bjørn Ole Rasch)
6. «Runarvisa / Song Of The Runes» (4:57)
  (Traditional)
7. «Ein Annan Halling / Another Hailing» (3:42)
  (Steinar Ofsdal)
8. «Maria, Hun Er En Jomfru Reen / Virgin Mary» (3:30)
  (Traditional)
9. «Margrete» (2:28)
  (Arve Moen Bergset)
10. «Kjellstadhallingen» (3:30)
  (Ola Kjellstad)
11. «Løvehjerte / Lionheart» (4:28)
  (Annbjørg Lien / Bjørn Ole RRasch)
12. «Stev» (4:13)
  (Stein Versto)
13. «Kjetil» (3:03)
  (Steinar Ofsdal)
14. «Bruremarsj Fra Østerdalen / Wedding March From Østerdalen» (3:13)
  (Traditional)
15. «Norafjølls / The Northern Fjords» (4:56)
  (Gunnulf Borgen)
16. «Olav Høljesen» (2:52)
  (Traditional)
17. «Bendik Og Årolilja» (6:08)
  (Traditional)
18. «Fenta / Gypsy Woman» (3:47)
  (Traditional)
19. «Til Sætersdal / To Setesdal» (2:57)
  (Arve Moen Bergset)
20. «Nåvårsetermarsjen / March From Nåvårsetra» (3:04)
  (Arve Moen Bergset)
21. «Fanitullen / The Devil's Tune» (3:53)
  (Arve Moen Bergset)
