= Alf Hulbækmo =

Norwegian musician and composer (born 1992)

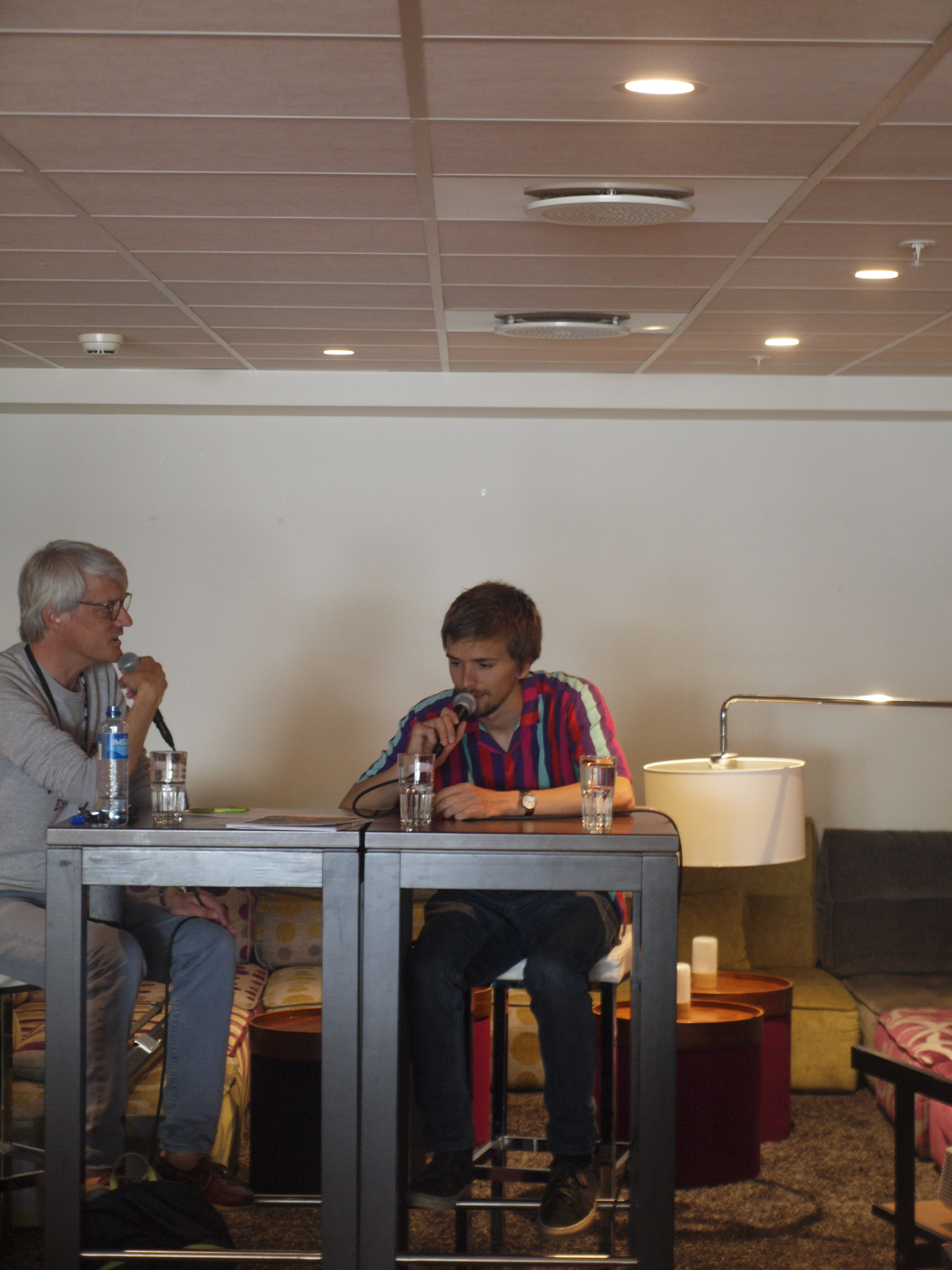
- Hulbækmo at Moldejazz 2019

Background information
- Born: 17 March 1992 (age 34); Tolga, Hedmark
- Origin: Norway
- Genres: Jazz
- Occupations: Musician, composer
- Instruments: Piano, keyboards, harmonica, saxophone, and vocals
- Label: Athletic Sound

Alf Hulbækmo (born 17 March 1992) is a Norwegian award winning musician (piano, keyboards, harmonica, saxophone, and vocals) and composer, son of the traditional folk musicians Tone Hulbækmo and Hans Fredrik Jacobsen, and brother of drummer Hans Hulbækmo.

== Discography ==
Siril & Alf

- 2017: Jeg Går Og Drømmer (Athletic Sound)

Hulbækmo & Jacobsen Familieorkester

- 2017: På Snei (ta:lik)
