= Bukkene Bruse =

Norwegian folk music band

- Origin: Oslo, Norway
- Genres: Norwegian traditional folk music, ambient
- Years active: 1988–present
- Label: Heilo
- Members: Arve Moen Bergset; Annbjørg Lien; Steinar Ofsdal; Bjørn Ole Rasch

Bukkene Bruse (established in 1988 in Norway) is a Norwegian traditional folk music band, presenting a varied repertoire of traditional and folk-style Norwegian songs, but also including many new compositions based on various Norwegian musical traditions.

== Biography ==
The members of the group include Annbjørg Lien, a prominent Hardanger fiddle and nyckelharpa (keyed fiddle) player; Arve Moen Bergset, fiddle player and vocalist; flutist Steinar Ofsdal; and pipe organist Bjørn Ole Rasch. The name of the group is taken from the fairy tale of the Three Billy Goats Gruff (Norwegian: De tre bukkene Bruse).

The group was formed in 1988 in Norway and has travelled and performed widely in Scandinavia, and elsewhere. In 1994, they were selected as official Olympic Musicians for the Lillehammer Winter Olympic Games and performed at the closing ceremony.

== Band members ==
- Arve Moen Bergset - vocals, violin, and hardingfele
- Annbjørg Lien - Hardingfele & nyckelharpa
- Steinar Ofsdal - flute, low whistle
- Bjørn Ole Rasch - pipe organ

== Albums ==
- Bukkene Bruse (1993)
- Åre (1995)
- Steinstolen (1998)
- Den Fagraste Rosa (2001)
- Spel (2004)
