= Tone Hulbækmo =

Norwegian singer and musician (born 1957)

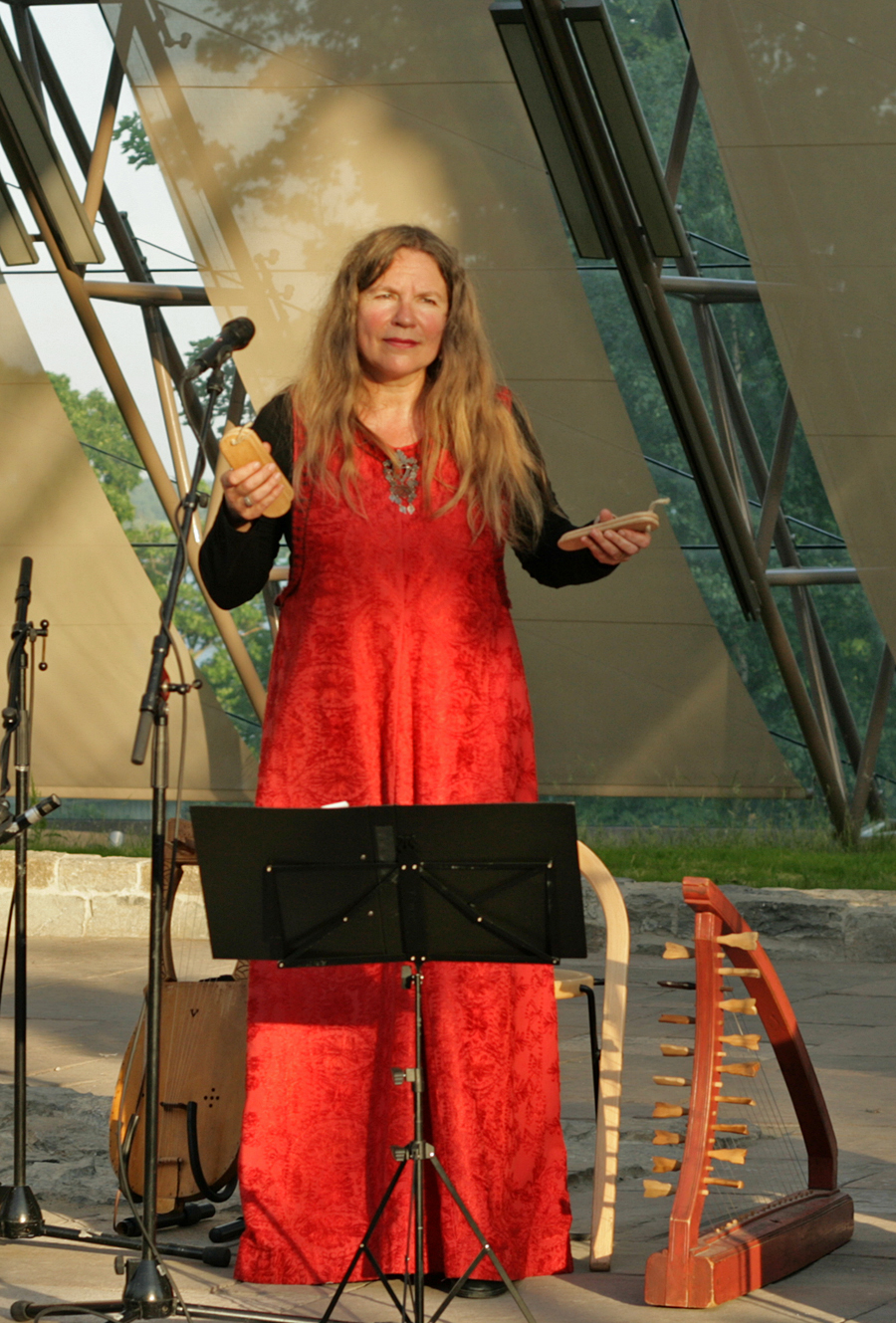
- Hulbækmo in 2008

Background information
- Born: 27 September 1957 (age 68); Tolga, Hedmark
- Origin: Norway
- Genres: Folk music
- Occupation: Musician

Tone Hulbækmo (born 27 September 1957) is a Norwegian singer and musician, married to the traditional folk flutist Hans Fredrik Jacobsen, and the mother of jazz drummer and vibraphonist Hans Hulbækmo (born 1989) and pianist Alf Hulbækmo (b. 17 March 1992).

== Discography ==
- 1983: Kåmmå No
- 1985: Kalenda Maya
- 1986: Svevende Jord
- 1988: Langt Nord I Skogen
- 1989: Norske Middelalderballader
- 1995: Konkylie
- 1997: Pilgrimsreiser (Kalenda Maya)
- 1999: Kyrja
- 2012: Nordic Woman (Grappa Music)
- 2016: Stifinner (Heilo Records).

== Awards ==
- 1984: Spellemannprisen 1983 in Folk album category for album Kåmmå no ..
- 1989: Spellemannprisen 1988 in Music for children category for albumet Langt nord i skogen together with Hans Fredrik Jacobsen
- 2004: Skjæraasenprisen, together with Hans Fredrik Jacobsen
- 2006: Gammleng Award in folk music category.
