= Hans Fredrik Jacobsen =

Norwegian folk musician (born 1954)

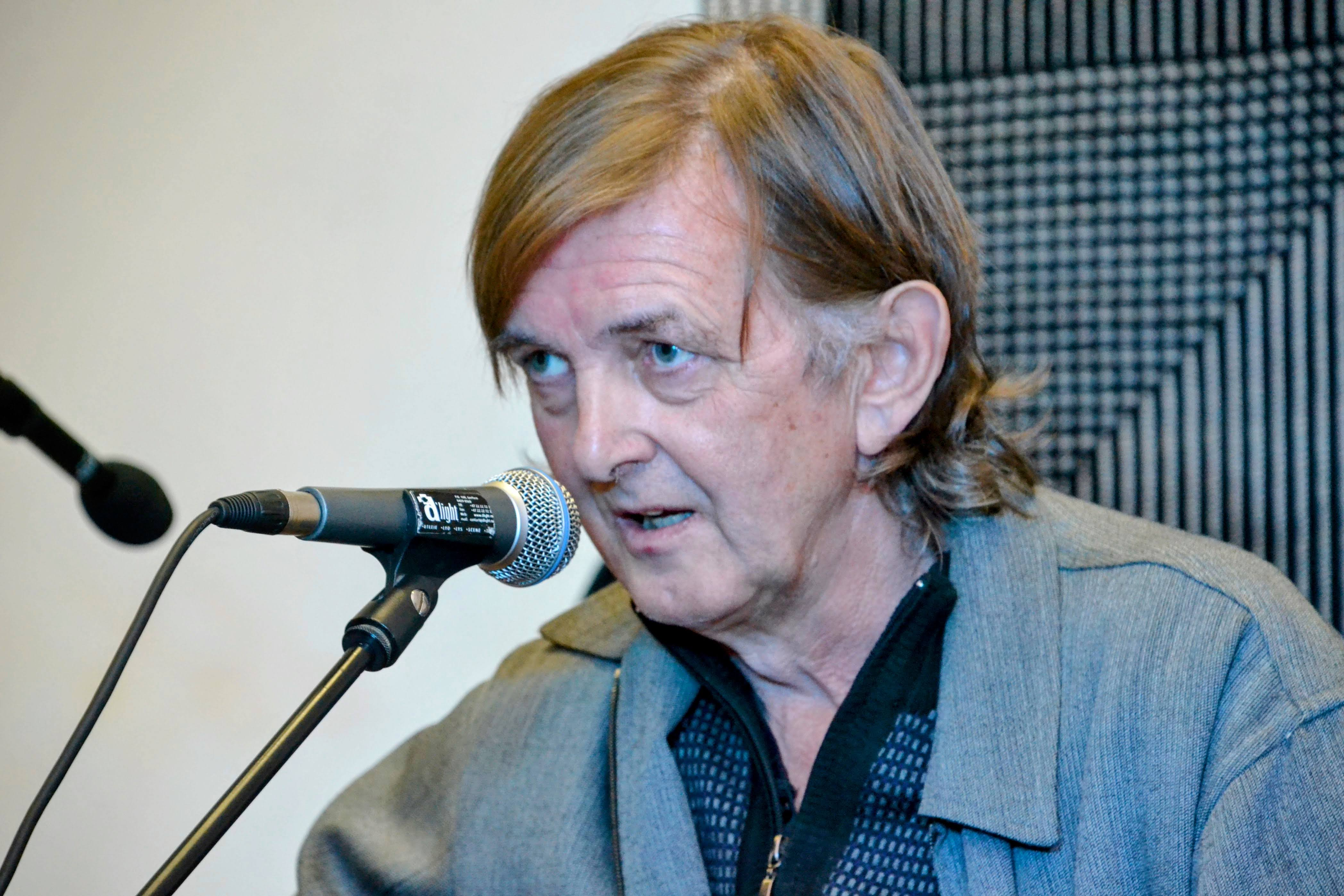
2013 Image of Hans Fredrik Jacobsen

Hans Fredrik Jacobsen (born 8 September 1954) is a Norwegian musician and composer, best known for his work with his wife, the traditional folk singer Tone Hulbækmo, and with the medieval music group Kalenda Maya, as well as his concert and studio music on a range of instruments: flute, diatonic button accordion, saxophone and guitar.

== Career ==
Jacobsen was born, in Risør, but is based in Tolga. He and his wife Tone Hulbækmo are the parents of jazz drummer and vibraphonist Hans Hulbækmo and pianist Alf Hulbækmo. Jacobsen has played with Secret Garden, Halldis Moren Vesaas, Ragnar Bjerkreim, Sondre Bratland, Annbjørg Lien and Henning Sommerro, among others.

== Discography ==
- Langt nord i skogen. 1988 (with Tone Hulbækmo)
- Seljefløyta. 1997 (with Steinar Ofsdal and Hallgrim Berg)
- Jól. 1998
- Vind. 2003
- Himalaya blues. 2004 (with Knut Reiersrud and Varja)

== Honors ==
- Spellemannprisen 1988 with Tone Hulbækmo best children's album for Langt nord i skogen
- Skjæraasenprisen 2004

== See also ==
- List of composers
