= Sondre Bratland =

Norwegian folk singer and song teacher

- Born: 11 September 1938 (age 88); Vinje Municipality, Norway
- Occupation: folk singer
- Awards: Spellemannprisen (1982); Order of St. Olav (2019)

Sondre Bratland (born 11 September 1938) is a Norwegian folk singer, song teacher and Government scholar. He has performed traditional songs from Setesdal and Telemark, collected religious folk tunes and composed music to songs by poets as Olav H. Hauge and Tarjei Vesaas. His album Pilegrimens Sangbog from 1982 earned him Spellemannprisen.

== Life and career ==
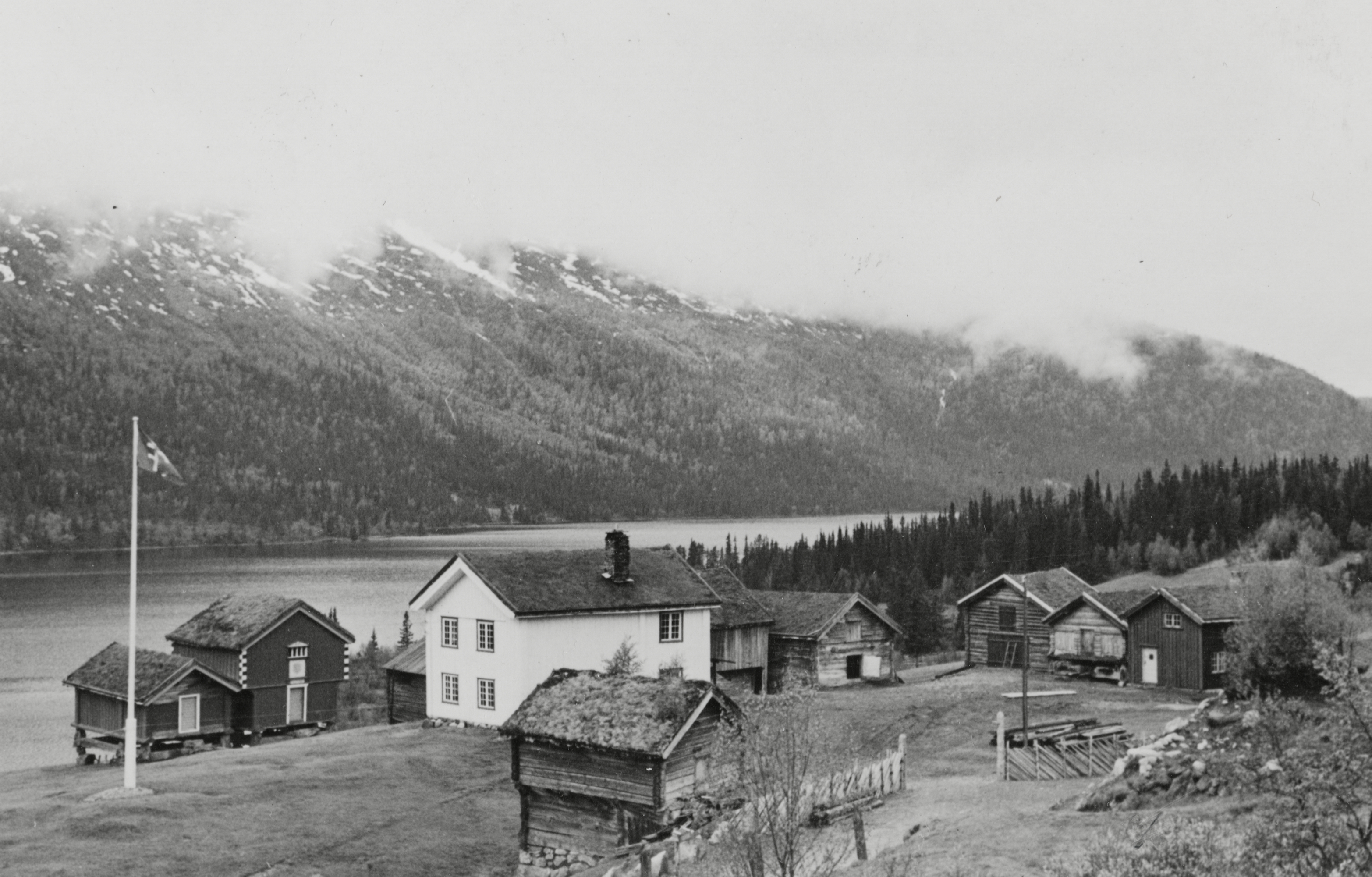
Vinje is a municipality with rich folk song traditions

Born in Vinje Municipality, where his father was a shopkeeper and his mother ran a hostel, Sondre Bratland grew up in an area and in a family with strong folk song traditions, especially among women. The song style is referred to as kveding. His mother sang at home and his aunt Brita Bratland was a folk singer who recorded songs for Norwegian Broadcasting Corporation. While influenced by the local song traditions, Bratland never studied it in his youth. He became a teacher.

His interest in folk singing was revoked through listening to the NRK radio program Folkemusikkhalvtimen (English: Folk music half-hour), where he became particularly fascinated by the folk singer Ragnar Vigdal. He then started studying and collecting folk tunes; among those he worked with were Brita Bratland, Ragnar Vigdal from Luster Municipality and Tallak Haslemo from Bykle Municipality.

He taught Arve Moen Bergset folk music singing for eight years.

In 1997, he was appointed Government scholar by the Parliament of Norway; allowing him to focusing full-time on music. He also headed the folk culture study department at the Telemark University College for five years.

Bratland has held concerts in more than 600 churches in Norway, but also performs in other venues and abroad.

The folk singer Ingebjørg Harman Bratland is daughter of a cousin of his.

Bratland was decorated Commander of the Order of St. Olav in 2019.

== Albums ==
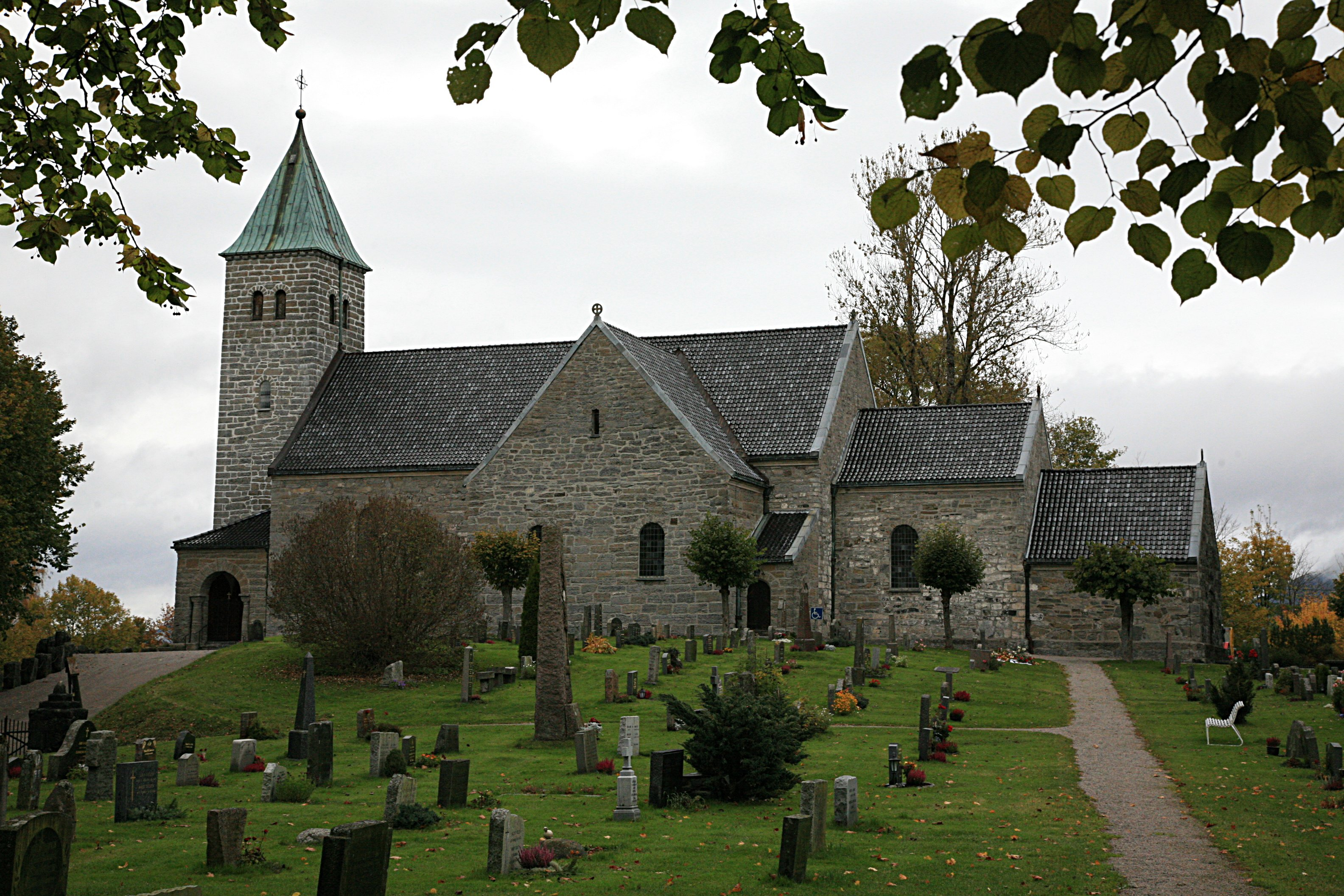
Gjerpen church, where many of Bratland's albums are recorded

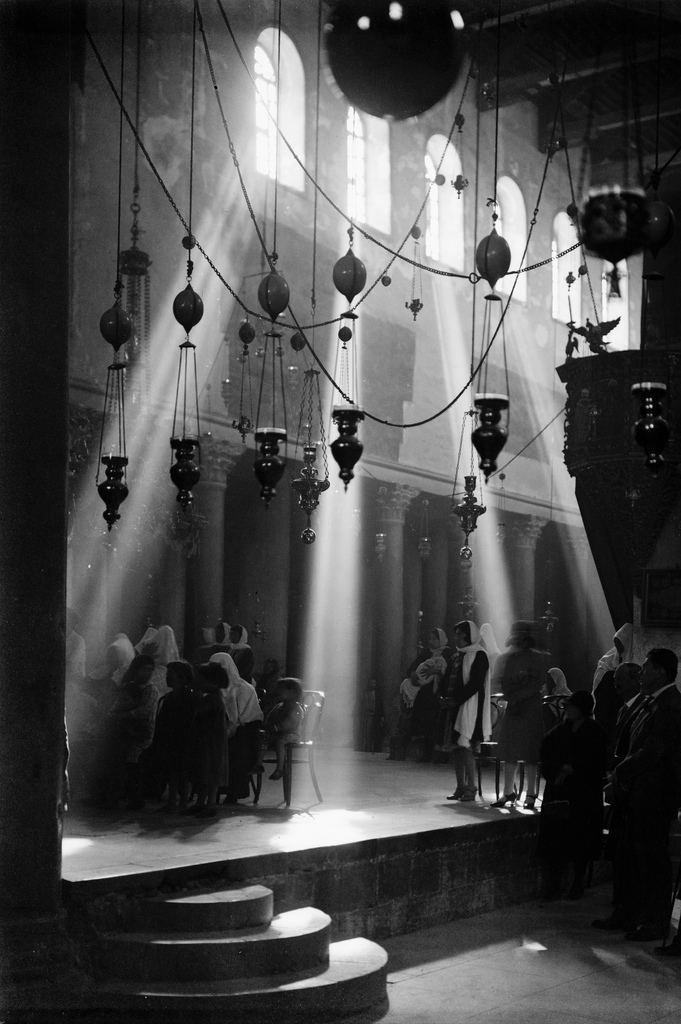
Church of the Nativity

Sondre Bratland released his first album Pilegrimenens Sangbog (The Pilgrims' songbook) in 1982. It was recorded in Gjerpen church, Skien, where several of his later albums also are recorded. Iver Kleive played the organ The recording was characterised by improvisations and the album has been praised for introducing a new way to perform hymns. Bratland was awarded the Spellemanns Award for the album.

Inn I Draumen, recorded in 1982, is a collection of lullabies. Most of them Norwegian folk tunes, but the album also included the song Gjev meg handa di which is based on an Irish folk tune (Down by the Sally Gardens) and lyrics by Bratland. Gjev meg handa di has become one of his most popular songs. The song has been recorded by other artists and is also used in funerals and weddings. It was considered for inclusion in Norsk salmebok 2013, a Church of Norway hymn book, but after a debate the Church council decided against inclusion on the grounds that the song lacked an explicit religious dimension.

In 1992 he released the album Rosa frå Betlehem (English: The Rose of Bethlehem). The album was recorded in the Church of the Nativity in Bethlehem. Musicians Iver Kleive, Knut Reiersrud, Paolo Vinaccia and Suheil Khoury participated in the recording along with a Palestinian choir. The album was met with general praise and has been described by reviewers as a masterpiece, a classic and the most beautiful Christmas album ever recorded in Norway. It has sold more than 60,000 copies.

The album Syng meg heim from 2005 is a country music album. It includes song by Johnny Cash and Hank Williams translated by Bratland into Norwegian, as well as Irish and Scottish folk tunes.

On the 2008 album Det Er Den Draumen (English: It´s That Dream), Bratland has set melodies to poems by Olav H. Hauge. The album was recorded in Kampen church.

Kirkelig Kulturverksted has been record company for all his solo albums.

== Awards and recognition ==
- 1982 fekk han Spellemannsprisen for "Pilegrimens Sangbog"
- 1986 Vinje municipality Culture Award
- 1997 Appointed Government scholar by the Parliament of Norway.
- 2003 Telemark county Culture Award

== Discography ==
- 1982: Pilegrimens Sangbog (Spellemann award)
- 1983: Den blå gleda (Nominated to the Spellemann award)
- 1988: Inn i draumen
- 1990: Mysteriet
- 1992: Kjeldevatn (Nominated to the Spellemann award)
- 1992: Rosa frå Betlehem
- 1994: Gjest i verda
- 1996: Atterklang (Nominated to the Spellemann award)
- 1999: Kvilestein
- 2002: Draumkvedet
- 2005: Syng meg heim
- 2006: Dialogue
- 2008: Det er den draumen
- 2011: Jol i mi song

In addition, Bratland has participated at other albums.
