= Sven Nyhus =

Norwegian folk musician (1932–2023)

- Born: 21 May 1932; Røros Municipality, Norway
- Died: 20 May 2023 (aged 90)
- Occupations: Folk musician, fiddler, composer and musicologist
- Employer: Norwegian Academy of Music
- Children: Åshild Breie Nyhus; Ingfrid Breie Nyhus
- Awards: Spellemannprisen honorary prize (2000); Order of St. Olav (2002)

Sven Nyhus (21 May 1932 – 20 May 2023) was a Norwegian folk musician, fiddler, composer and musicologist. He was born in Røros Municipality; the son of construction worker and fiddler Peder Nyhus, and the father of Harding fiddler Åshild Breie Nyhus and pianist Ingfrid Breie Nyhus. Among his collections are Pols i Røros-tradisjon from 1973 and Felklang på Rørosmål from 1983. Among his albums are Bergrosa from 1984 and Grimen from 1997. He was appointed professor at the Norwegian Academy of Music from 1989 to 2002. He was awarded the Spellemannprisen honorary prize in 2000, and was decorated Commander of the Order of St. Olav in 2002.

Nyhus died on 20 May 2023 at the age of 90, one day before his 91st birthday.
