= Bjørn Ole Rasch =

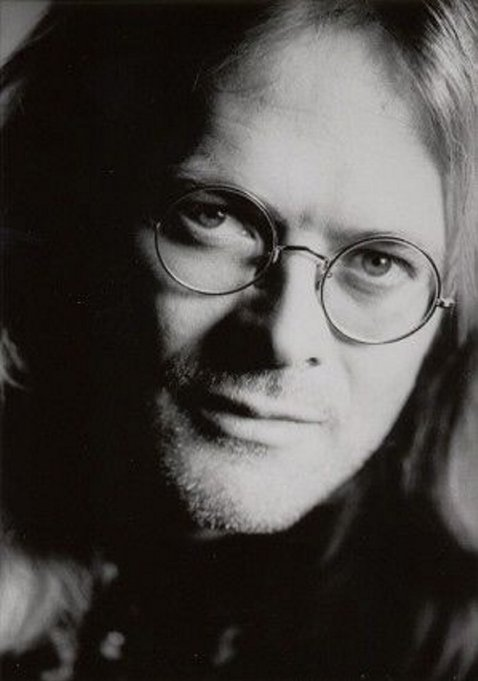

Background information
- Born: 28 July 1959; Elverum, Norway
- Origin: Norway
- Genres: Traditional Folk, World music, Progressive music
- Occupations: Musician, composer, producer, writer
- Instruments: Piano, keyboards
- Label: Grappa Music
- Website: www.bjornolerasch.com

Bjørn Ole Rasch (born 28 July 1959) is a Norwegian artist (keyboards performer), composer, arranger and producer. He is a professor of popular music at the Agder University College. With his wife, Annbjørg Lien, he runs the Kongshavn Studios in Kristiansand.

== Career ==
Rasch was born in Elverum and raised in Kristiansand. He began playing the piano at seven and learned much piano technique from his mother. He was taught classical music for eight years before he bought his first synthesizer and became more interested in composing and arranging. 19 years old, he composed music for a theater performance of the folktale "Manndottera og kjerringdottera", and he continued to compose music for the theater some years after this, among others 3 ballets and two more theater plays among them the first performance of J.R.R. Tolkien's The Hobbit in Norway.

In 1981 he joined the prog rock band "Boys Voice", which comprised fellow students from Agder Musikkonservatorium in Kristiansand. The band released the single 20 Golden Lies in 1984, before they released their album Talking to the Moon the year after. At the same time, he was a member of the jazz group EtCetera from Molde that also released an album in 1985.

Most of his musical productions are at the intersection of Norwegian traditional folk music and world music. His work includes major productions and compositions for theater, ballet, movies cd productions and TV, and most of these have been released worldwide. In 2002, Rasch was appointed the first professor of Rhythmic music in Norway, and in 2003 he became a member of Agder Academy of Sciences. Rasch has worked with Annbjørg Lien as producer, arranger and composer since 1994, and since 1997 he has been a member of the traditional folk ensemble Bukkene Bruse. In 2009 Rasch and Lien released their first duo-album under the name Come Home frå 2009. Most of their releases together is a blend of Norwegian folk music and elements from world-music.

Rasch was appointed Official Olympic Musician in 1993 for the Lillehammer Olympics, which resulted in a long collaboration with the artist Sissel Kyrkjebø. I 1999, Rasch as member of the Bukkene Bruse group was awarded the Prøysen Prize. In 1994 he was a member of the group Secret Garden as arranger and musician, a collaboration that in 2011 had resulted in record sales of nearly 4.5 million. In 1995 he received triple platinum for his work as arranger and musician on "Innerst i sjelen" with Sissel Kyrkjebø at Universal Records, and in 2009 he received Golden record both in Norway and Sweden for his production "Spellemann" at Grappa Records and in 2010 for the production "Julenatt" at EMI Records.

In 1999, Rasch was ambassador for the charity Save the Children together with Bukkene Bruse, and in 2005 he composed the music for the international film Valo and the musical Emma together with his wife Annbjørg Lien. In 2010 he authored the music book Analog Syntese (Analog Synthesis) on his own imprint. He has worked as an arranger and musician for artists like Randy Crawford, The Chieftains, Keith Emerson, Trilok Gurtu, Mahsa Vahdat, Hanne Boel, José Carreras, Sinéad O'Connor, Sissel Kyrkjebø, Lisa Nilsson, Kirsten Bråten Berg, Hallvard T. Bjørgum, Sondre Bratland, Jahn Teigen, Elisabeth Andreassen, Sigvart Dagsland, to mention some. Present (2013) he focuses his work around the concepts Bukkene Bruse, Secret Garden and Annbjørg Lien, besides working as a composer, producer, arranger, writer and lecturer on the rhythmic music and history.

== Honors and Nominations ==
- Appointed as Olympic Musician by the International Olympic Committee in 1993
- Nominated for Norwegian Grammy Spellemann 1995 for Sissel Kyrkjebøe "Deepest in my Soul" (Arranger and musician)
- Triple Platinum for the production "Innerst i Sjelen" (Arranger and musician)
- Nominated for Norwegian Grammy Spellemann 1996 forBukkene Bruse "Åre" (Artist, arranger and musician)
- Nominated for Norwegian Grammy Spellemann 1997 for Annbjørg Lien "Prisme" (Producer, composer, arranger and musician)
- Nominated for Norwegian Grammy Spellemann 1998 for Bukkene Bruse "Steinstolen" (Producer, artist, composer, arranger and musician)
- Prøysenprisen 1998 within the band Bukkene Bruse
- Appointed to ambassador for the charity organisation Save the Children in 1999 together with Bukkene Bruse
- Nominated for Norwegian Grammy NOPA awards 1999 for best song and arrangement for the composition "W".
- Nominated for Norwegian Grammy Spellemann 2001 for Bukkene Bruse "Den Fagrasta Rosa" (Producer, artist, composer, arranger and musician)
- Nominated for Norwegian Grammy Spellemann 2002 for Annbjørg Lien "Aliens Alive" (Producer, composer, arranger and musician)
- Appointed to the first professor in Rhythmic music in Norway 2002 by international recognition
- Member of Agder Academy of Sciences 2003
- Nominated for Norwegian Grammy Spellemann 2010 for Sondre Bratland/Annbjørg Lien "Alle Vegne" (Producer)
- Nominated for Norwegian Grammy Spellemann 2012 for Annbjørg Lien "Khoom Loy" (Producer, composer, arranger and musician)
- Gold Record for the production "Spellemann" for Elisabeth Andreassen 2009 (Producer, composer, arranger and musician)
- Gold Record for the production "Julenatt" for Rein Alexander and Elisabeth Andreassen (Producer, composer, arranger and musician)

== Discography (in selection) ==
Within Bukkene Bruse

- 1993: Bukkene Bruse
- 1995: Åre (Grappa Music)
- 1998: Steinstolen (Grappa Music)
- 2001: Den Fagraste Rosa
- 2004: Spel

With Secret Garden

- 1996: Songs from a Secret Garden (Mercury)
- 1997: White Stones (Mercury)
- 1998: Fairytales – Highlights from Secret Garden (Mercury), compilation
- 1999: Dawn of a New Century (Universal Music, Norway)
- 2000: Dreamcatcher: Best of Secret Garden (Philips), compilation
- 2001: Once in a Red Moon (Universal Music)
- 2004: The Ultimate Secret Garden (Universal Music), Asia compilation
- 2005: Earthsongs (Universal Music)
- 2007: Inside I'm Singing (Mercury)
- 2011: Winter Poem (Hearts of Space Records)

With Annbjørg Lien

- 2003: 40 with artists Nico Widerberg, Ørnulf Opdahl, Kjell Nupen, Magne Furholmen and Per Fronth (Grappa/BIZ Music)
- 2005: Musikalen Emma (Agder Theatre Music)
- 2008: Roquebrune with artists Kjell Nupen, Magne Furholmen, Elisabeth Werp, Bjørg Thorilldotter and Per Fronth (Grappa/BIZ Music)
- 2008: Den Prektigkledde Sommerfugl (KK Music)
- 2009: Come Home (Grappa Music)
- 2002: Music & Art in a Box Annbjørg Lien/Bjørn Ole Rasch with artists Nico Widerberg, Ørnulf Opdahl, Tone Svaland Holberg og Per Fronth (Grappa/BIZ Records)

== Other Productions ==
- 1998: Hele Historien Jahn Teigen (EMI Records)
- 1999: Baba Yaga Annbjørg Lien (Grappa/Norside Records)
- 2000: Northern Nights-Music from the Top of the World Diverse Artister (Norside Records)
- 2000: Nordic Roots Diverse Artister (Norside Records)
- 2001: Fragrance of Norway Annbjørg Lien (Dreamboat Records)
- 2002: Aliens Alive Annbjørg Lien (Grappa Records)
- 2002: II Orbina (DAT Records)
- 2006: 9 Iglo (FoM-R Records)
- 2007: Acoustic Diverse Artister (FoM-R Records)
- 2007: Gjenklang Diverse Artister (Heilo Records)
- 2009: Abes & Babes Abes & Babes (Grappa Records)
- 2008: Spellemann Elisabeth Andreassen (Grappa Music)
- 2009: Julenatt Rein Alexander/Elisabeth Andreassen (EMI Records)
- 2010: Ein engel til jol Inger Lise Stulien (BMG Records)
- 2010: Alle vegne Sondre Bratland/Annbjørg Lien (Kirkelig Kulturverksted)
- 2010: Killings (album) Vilde Nupen (South Norwegian Jazz Records)
- 2010: As They Fill the Horizon Helene Bøksle/Torstein Sødal (TSR Records)
- 2011: Heim til jol Inger Lise Stulien (BMG Records)
- 2012: Kärleken & Livet Elisabeth Andreassen (Grappa Records)
- 2013: Min vår Inger Lise Stulien (BMG Records)
- 2013: Sgrow Sgrow (Karmakosmetix Records)
- 2013: Khoom Loy Annbjørg Lien (Grappa Records)
