= Arve Moen Bergset =

Norwegian traditional folk singer, hardanger fiddler, and classical violinist

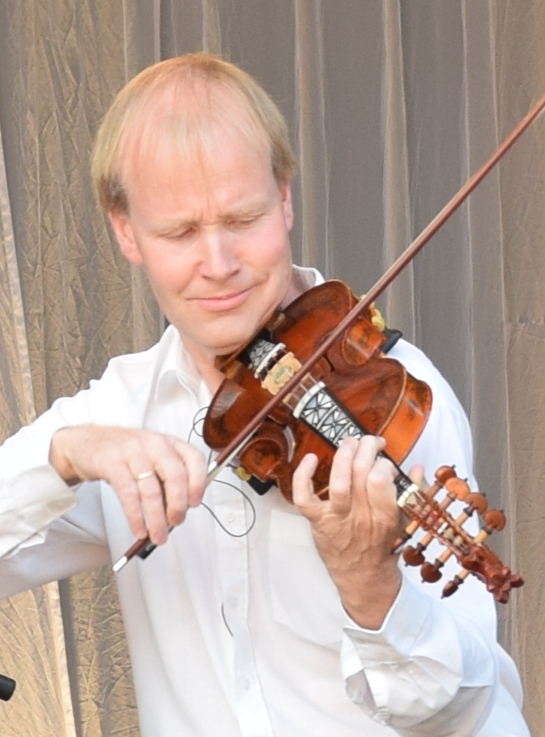
Arve Moen playing hardanger fiddle

Arve Moen Bergset (born 13 March 1972) is a Norwegian traditional folk singer, hardanger fiddler, and classical violinist. He is known both for his solo works as well as for his works with Bukkene Bruse.

== Life and career ==
He was born in Sandnessjøen, Nordland County in 1972. When he was five, he moved to Vinje Municipality, an area with rich folk music traditions. Odd Nordstoga was among his childhood friends. At eight, he started taking song lessons with Sondre Bratland. He released two albums of folk and traditional religious music as a boy singer in 1986 (Litle Fuglen, cassette) and Arvesølv in 1987. For Arvesølv, he won the Spellemannprisen award in the category of traditional music.

Bergset is a member of Bukkene Bruse, a Norwegian folk music group, for whom he sings and plays the violin.

In 1994, Bergset was an Olympic musician at the 1994 Winter Olympics in Lillehammer.

Parallel to his folk music career, he is a classical musician, educated at the Norwegian Academy of Music. He has played with the Norwegian Chamber Orchestra and is since 2003 employed as a violinist in the Oslo Philharmonic Orchestra.

Bergset played the solo part in the recording of the two Hardanger Fiddle Concertos by Geirr Tveitt with the Stavanger Symphony Orchestra in September 1999, under the direction of Ole Kristian Ruud.

Arve Moen Bergset also performs with his wife, pianist Gudrun Skretting. Their daughter Margrete (Maggie) was a finalist in the Norwegian Melodi Grand Prix Junior 2008. The family lives in Billingstad, Akershus County.

== Discography ==
=== Solo records ===
- Litle fuglen (1986, cassette)
- Arvesølv (1987)
- Religiøse folketonar (1997)

=== As soloist ===
- Johan Kvandal: Fantasia for hardingfele og orkester (1999 – soloist with hardanger fiddle)) with Kristiansand kammerorkester and conductor Jan Stigmer.
- Stephen Frost: Bassoon Concerto; Oboe Concerto; The Lesson (2000 – soloist as classical singer at the Lesson) with Bournemouth Symphony Orchestra and conductor Tony Harrison
- Geirr Tveitt: To konsertar for hardingfele og orkester (2002 – soloist with hardanger fiddle) with Stavanger Symphony Orchestra and conductor Ole Kristian Ruud
- Johan Halvorsens Fossegrimen, Greetings to Roosevelt (2002 – soloist with hardanger fiddle) with Latvian National Symphony Orchestra.

=== With Bukkene Bruse ===
See Bukkene Bruse
