= Grappa Musikkforlag =

Norwegian music company

- Founded: 1983
- Founder: Helge Westbye
- Genre: Various
- Country of origin: Norway
- Location: Oslo
- Official website: www.grappa.no/en

Grappa Musikkforlag (established 1983 in Norway) is a Norwegian music company initiated and directed by Helge Westbye. It is one of the oldest and biggest independent record companies in Norway today. The company represents prominent Norwegian artists, and the catalog consists of more than 35 000 tracks in all genres of music. The classic catalog is marketed through Simax Classics. Folk and world music is released on the Heilo label which was taken over by Grappa in 1995. Besides representing the labels Blue Mood (blues and country), Hubro (contemporary jazz) and Barneselskapet (children's music). Grappa is also engaged in several other music companies such as Drabant Music, Curling Legs and Rune Grammofon. Grappa has a close cooperation with the "Norsk Komponistforening" for the marketing of their contemporary music published on the Aurora label and with Norsk Jazzforum for the jazz label Odin. Grappa is the Norwegian Music Publishing company with the most nominations for the Norwegian Grammy, Spellemannprisen. The company's DVD releases have also set Norwegian sales records. Grappa is part of FONO.
