= Al-Balad Music Festival =

Concert series in Amman, Jordan

- Genre: Music
- Dates: Biannual (Summertime)
- Location(s): Amman, Jordan
- Years active: 11
- Founded: 2009
- Attendance: 10,000
- Patron(s): Roman amphitheater, Odeon amphitheater, Al-Balad Theater
- Website: http://www.albaladmusicfestival.org/Contents/About.aspx

The Al-Balad Music Festival (also known simply as the Al-Balad Festival) is a biannual multi-day concert series in Jordan which takes place in downtown Amman, in the historic Roman amphitheater and Odeon amphitheater. It was launched in 2009 by Al Balad Theater and receives support from the Greater Amman Municipality, the Jordanian Ministry of Tourism and Antiquities, and the European Union in Jordan, as well as other sponsoring partners in media, tourism, culture, and the arts.

The Al-Balad festival hosts different bands each time from Jordan and abroad, but with special emphasis on artists from the Arab region.

Among the more prominent artists who have spotlighted in previous line-ups are:

- Jordanian alt-rock band El Morabba3 (2015, 2019)
- Algerian singer-songwriter Souad Massi (2011, 2015)
- Lebanese vocalist Tania Saleh (2013, 2019)
- Artist and composer Tamer Abu Ghazaleh of Egypt (2013)
- Egyptian performer/artist Dina El Wadidi
- Tunisian singer Mounir Troudy of Tunisia
- Hany Adel of Wust El Balad

== See also ==
- Jerash Festival
- Amman Design Week
