= Songs from a Stolen Spring =

Studio album by Various Artists
- Released: 18 October 2014 (United States); 24 October 2014 (Europe)
- Label: Valley Entertainment, Kirkelig Kulturverksted
- Producer: Erik Hillestad

Songs from a Stolen Spring is a compilation album that mainly features duets and mashups of protest and peace songs performed by pairings of Western musicians with their contemporaries from the countries where the Arab Spring took place.

== Track listing ==
No.	Title	Performer(s)	Length
1.	"Freedom / A New Beginning"	The Blind Boys of Alabama / Eskenderella	5:24
2.	"Not a Word was Spoken / Dancing in the Street"	Tania Saleh / Terry Evans	4:57
3.	"A Simple Song of Freedom / Once We were True Rebels"	Ray Benson / Mounir Troudi	5:00
4.	"Beyond These Doors / Get Up, Stand Up"	Dina El Wedidi / Glenn Tilbrook	7:15
5.	"Ol’ Mother Earth / I Still Exist"	Maria McKee / Massar Egbari	5:48
6.	"Bread, Freedom / If I Can Dream"	Ramy Essam / Mighty Sam McClain	4:45
7.	"Danger Zone"	Soozie Tyrell	2:29
8.	"Break Your Fears"	Rim Banna	3:11
9.	"Once Upon a Time / Many Rivers to Cross"	Lobna Noomene / Lisbeth Scott	6:28
