= Khalil Chahine =

- Genres: World Music, Jazz, Pop-Classic, Funk, Rock, Hip-Hop
- Occupations: Audio Engineer, Mixer, Producer
- Website: khalil-chahine.com

Khalil Chahine is a German-Lebanese audio engineer, mixer, and music producer. Originally from Beirut, he has worked with artists and musicians from the Middle East, Europe, and North America.

== Early life and education ==
Though he studied music and played keyboard as a child, an early interest and aptitude for math and sciences drove Chahine to complete a BA in Physics. While undertaking specialised studies in Psychoacoustics, his curiosity about the physics of sound and its relation to music led him to audio engineering, and he was trained as a recording engineer in France.

== Professional career ==
=== Studio production ===
Chahine worked on several influential albums within the Middle Eastern music scene with producers Michel Elefteriades, Ziad Rahbani, and others. He mixed and mastered "Sukoon" an album released after the early death of Palestinian composer and musician Mohsen Subhi.

In Berlin, Chahine founded Musigma, an audio consulting, production, and distribution company. Through Musigma, Chahine has worked with artists and musicians in Europe and the Middle East to produce and distribute music with a wide team of experts, working at Riverside Studios, Jazzanova Recording Studios, and Blackbird Music Studio among others in Berlin. He has worked and collaborated with a number of other producers and engineers, including Hrólfur Vagnsson, Bernd Kurtzke, Sacha "Busy" Bühren, Martin Eyerer, Peter "BlackPete" Schmidt, Victor Van Vugt, and Samon Kawamura. He has also mixed music for film, including German drama Tiger Girl (film), which was screened at the 67th Berlin International Film Festival.

=== Research and development ===
Chahine took part in research and development of algorithms related to 3D Sound at Ralph Kessler's Pinguin Inc. in Hamburg, Germany. He has been invited to give guest lectures at the SAE Institute Berlin and consulted by Focusrite for his professional opinion on new products within the audio engineering market.

=== Live music production ===
In Beirut, Chahine worked as an audio consultant and live mixing engineer with various artists. He was also partially responsible for developing the sound and acoustic treatment of MusicHall (Beirut) and Metro Al Madina, two of Beirut's premier live music venues. Chahine has worked as an FOH & monitor engineer as well as in the role of Music Director for several productions.

== Selected production discography ==
Sources:

- Quest – Out Of Nations (2018) | Producer, Mixing
- Grand Masquerade – The Trouble Notes (2017) | Producer, Mixing
- Toorab – Jean Madani (2017) | Producer, Mastering
- PopHertz – 5vor12 (2017) | Mixing
- Distant Rendezvous – Who Killed Bruce Lee (2016) | Mastering
- Regenmacher – Megaloh (2016) | Mixing
- Her – Rita Redshoes (2016) | Mastering
- Okular EP – Sylabil Spill (2015) | Mixing, Mastering
- A Few Images – Tania Saleh (2014) | Recording
- Pride – Rea Garvey (2014) | Ass. Mastering
- MTV Unplugged – Kahedi Radio Show – Max Herre (2013) | Ass. Mastering
- Silence – Mohsen Subhi (2011) | Recording, Mixing
- Ya Zaman – Mike Massy (2011) | Recording, Mixing
- The Festivals Album Baalbeck & Beiteddine – Hanine Y Son Cubano (2010) | Mixing
- Eh Fi Amal – Fairuz (2010) | Recording, Mixing
- Falak – Rima Khcheich (2009) | Audio Engineer
- Live at Damascus Citadel – Ziad Rahbani (2008) | Mixing
