= The Mirrors of My Soul =

Studio album by Rim Banna
- Released: 18 April 2005
- Recorded: Oslo, Norway
- Genre: Folk, Palestinian Music
- Length: 55:07
- Label: Valley Entertainment
- Producer: Erik Hillestad

Rim Banna chronology
Krybberom (2003)	The Mirrors of My Soul (2005)	This Was Not My Story (2006)

The Mirrors of My Soul is an album by the Palestinian artist Rim Banna, released in 2005. Rim Banna, who gained global recognition as part of the Lullabies from the Axis of Evil project returns with a Norwegian band with a decidedly folk-pop recording of Palestinian songs. Produced in cooperation with a Norwegean quintet, it features "Western pop styling" fused with Middle Eastern modal and vocal structures, and Arabic lyrics. Though the style of this album differs from previous recordings, the subject matter has basically remained constant. The album includes "songs of despair and hope" about the lives of "a struggling people, and even a song about late Palestinian leader and PA president Arafat in a way that is both thoughtful and subtle".

== Track listing ==
1. "The Mirrors Of My Soul" - 6:19 (مرايا الروح)
2. "The Carmel Of My Soul" - 4:37 (كرمال الروح)
3. "Malek" - 4:08 (مالك)
4. "Ya Jammal" - 4:36 (ياجمال)
5. "Masha'al" - 4:51 (مشعل)
6. "Sarah" - 5:10 (سارة)
7. "The Moon Glowed" - 4:01 (لاح القمر)
8. "The Top Of The Mountain" - 5:24 (راس الجبل)
9. "Fares Odeh" - 5:57 (فارس عودة)
10. "The Grandma With A Limp" - 3:53 (ستّي العرجة)
11. "The Voice, The Fragrance And The Figure" - 6:11 (الصوت والرائحة والشكل)

== Musicians ==
- Rim Banna, vocals
- Elvind Aarset, guitar
- David Wallumrød, piano and keyboards
- Gjermund Silset, bass guitar
- Rune Arnesen, drums
