= Mahsa Vahdat =

Persian classical and world music singer

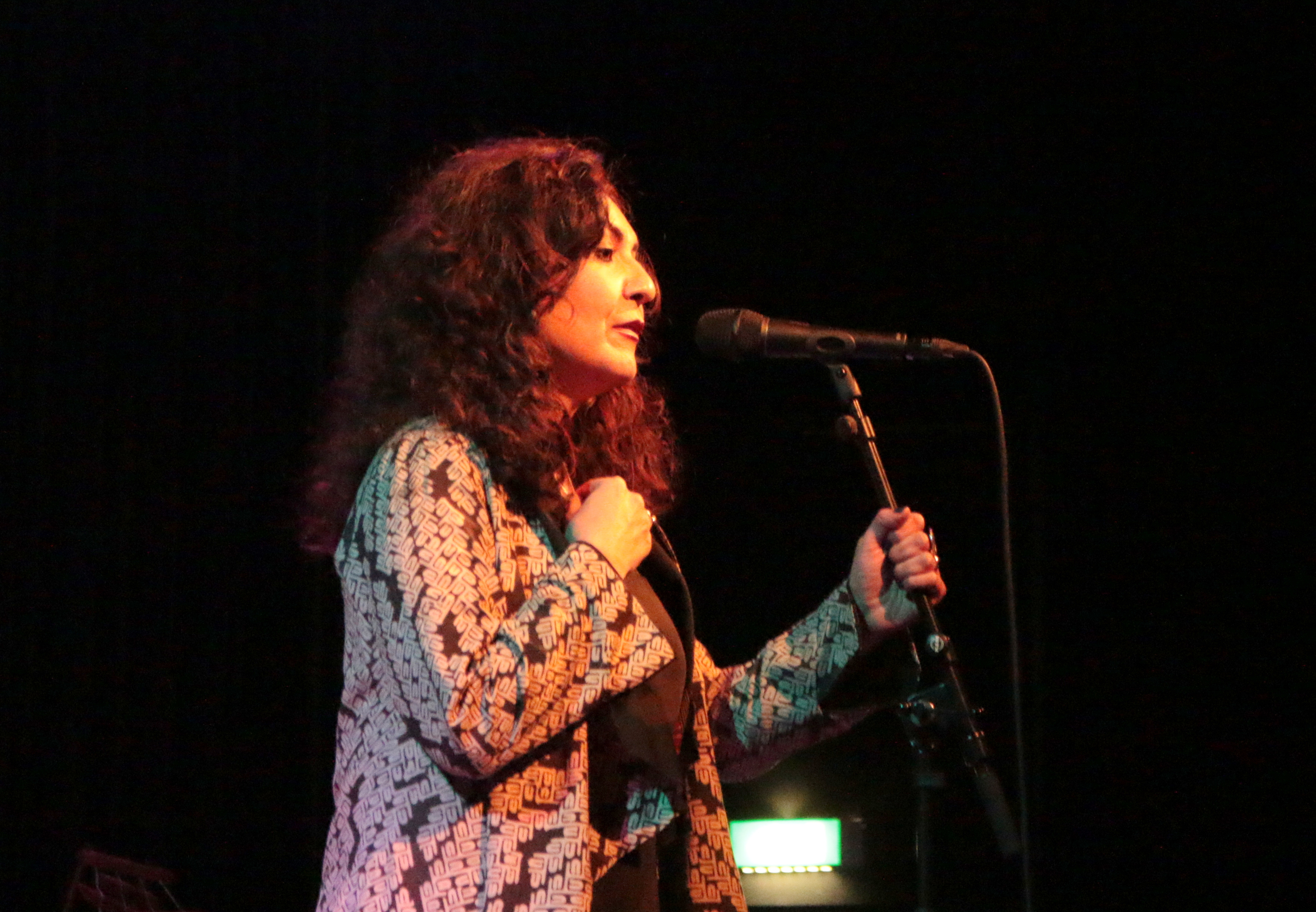
Persian vocalist Mahsa Vahdat 2018

Mahsa Vahdat (in Persian مهسا وحدت) (born 29 October 1973, Tehran, Iran) is a Persian classical and world music singer.

Mahsa Vahdat's music style is contemporary expression inspired by old traditional and folk and regional music of Persia/Iran that she developed for many years and it is the result of work with many musicians from Iran and other countries. She writes most of her songs.

In her music she also developed dialogue between other cultures in a high artistic quality and she got a huge response internationally. The text of her work is mostly from classical and contemporary Persian poetry such as the works by Hafez and Rumi. She has released materials with her sister Marjan Vahdat (in Persian مرجان وحدت). as in albums Songs from a Persian Garden, I Am Eve and Twinklings of Hope.

== Life ==
After learning to play piano, she studied traditional Persian singing under Pari Meleki and Mehdi Fallah. She also studied setar with Ramin Kakavand and Masoud Shoari. In 1993, she entered Tehran University obtaining a BA in Music from the university's music faculty, working alongside Sharif lotfi, Ahmad Pejman, Hooshang Zarif, Behnam Vohdani, Abdorreza Sajadi, Houshang Kamkar, and Mohammad Reza Darvishi.

As women are not allowed to sing in public as a solo singer after 1979 Islamic Revolution, most of Mahsa Vahdat's albums were recorded outside Iran where she enjoys great fame with the Iranian diaspora and in world music circles. In Tehran she teaches Persian vocal music in her home.

== Career ==
Following her participation in Lullabies from the Axis of Evil (2004), Mahsa started a long lasting collaboration with the Norwegian record label Kirkelig Kulturverksted (KKV) and producer Erik Hillestad, which led to a world wide release of a series of records. The album was conceived as a humanistic counter to former US President George Bush’s assertion that Iran, North Korea, and Iraq constituted an axis of evil by showcasing music from these nations. It also included musicians from the Palestinian territories, Afghanistan, Syria, Cuba, and Libya – the latter three of which were identified by Bush's Undersecretary of State and later National Security Advisor to the Trump White House John Bolton as ‘beyond the axis of evil’.

Since 2007 Mahsa has been one of the ambassadors of Freemuse, an independent international organization that advocates freedom of expression for musicians and composers worldwide. In 2010, she was granted the Freemuse Award.

Since 1995 Mahsa has performed as an independent artist in concerts and festivals in Asia, Europe, the US, and Africa together with musicians from Iran, Europe and America. Mahsa Vahdat has worked with many acclaimed musicians in the world such as Tord Gustavsen, Knut Reiersrud, Pasha Hanjani, Atabak Elyasi, Shervin Mohajer, Mathias Eick, SKRUK Choir, and Mighty Sam McClain.

In 2007 she recorded "Songs from a Persian Garden" in a charity concert in Tehran in the residence of Italian embassy in cooperation with UN for disabled children in Zahedan and it was released in 2007 in Norway and Europe and America. It was a mix ensemble of Norwegian and Iranian musicians together with her sister Marjan Vahdat as another lead singer. It has been arranged by Knut Reiersrud (Norwegian guitarist and musician). In 2008 she released the I am Eve album with her sister Marjan Vahdat that has a strong message for women in Iran; eg the lyrics of the first track "I am Eve" strongly expresses the power of women who have many restrictions under the Iranian government. It has been arranged by Atabak Elyasi (Iranian composer). The album received many attention in world music societies and people in Iran and excellent reviews in world music magazines such as fRoots, Songlines and many other reviews.

== Discography ==
Mahsa Vahdat has released a number of albums – some in collaboration.

Title in English	Date	Song title in Persian	Credits
Risheh dar Khak		ریشه در خاک tr. Richéhâdar Khak	
Lullabies from the Axis of Evil	2003	لالایی محور شرارت	
Songs from a Persian Garden	2007	آوازهایی از باغ ایرانی	Mahsa Vahdat & Marjan Vahdat
I Am Eve	2008	حوا منم	Mahsa Vahdat, Marjan Vahdat & Atabak Elyasi
Scent of Reunion: Love Duets Across Civilizations	2010	بوی خوش وصل	Mahsa Vahdat & Mighty Sam McClain
In the Mirror of Wine (I Vinens Speil)	2010	در آیینه شراب	SKRUK & Mahsa Vahdat
Twinklings of Hope	2012	دارم امیدی	Mahsa Vahdat & Marjan Vahdat
A Deeper Tone of Longing: Love Duets Across Civilizations	2012	رنگ بی‌تابی	Mahsa Vahdat & Mighty Sam McClain
Traces of an Old Vineyard	2015	به طربناکی خاک	Mahsa Vahdat
Placeless	2019	لامکان	Kronos Quartet, Mahsa Vahdat & Marjan Vahdat
Enlighten the Night	2020	مى تابم به شب	Mahsa Vahdat
Braids of innocence	2022		Mahsa Vahdat & SKRUK

== Personal life ==
She is married to Iranian musician Atabak Elyasi. They cooperate in many projects together.
