= A Few Images (Algumas Imagens) =

Studio album by Tania Saleh
- Released: United States 11 November 2014; Europe 19 September 2014
- Recorded: Beirut, Lebanon; Oslo, Norway
- Genre: World, Arabic, jazz, bossa nova
- Label: Valley Entertainment, Kirkelig Kulturverksted
- Producer: Tania Saleh, Erik Hillestad

Tania Saleh chronology
Live at DRM	A Few Images (Algumas Imagens)

A Few Images (Algumas Imagens) is the 2014 album by the Lebanese musician Tania Saleh. The album was crowdfunded using Zoomaal. It was distributed by Kirkelig Kulturverksted and Valley Entertainment.

== Background and production ==
A Few Images was funded through Zoomal, a website that supports Arab projects, because, as Saleh said, "Arab production companies fund a certain type of artist and have no interest in new musical styles". It was produced by Saleh herself with the help of Norwegian producer Erik Hillestad, and featured guest appearances by such Lebanese composers Issam Hajali, Charbel Rouhana, and Claude Chalhoub, as well as Norwegian musicians such as Kjetil Bjerkestrand, Mathias Ek, and members of the Norwegian Radio String Orchestra, the latter of whom performed pieces written for the album by arranger Edward Torikian.

== Composition ==
A Few Images bridges her Arabian identity and international influences that range between classical music, jazz, and Brazilian bossa nova. Saleh attributed her bossa nova influence to the role that Brazil plays in the lives of Lebanese people, containing three times more Lebanese people than Lebanon itself. Lyrically, the album tells love stories of Lebanese Arab women amidst "hatred, bloodshed, divisions, and endless conflicts".

The song "Beirut Windows" (As Janelas De Beirute) is a sentimental ballad eliciting "powerful images of the Lebanese capital". "Reda", playful dance song, tells a story of a woman harassed by her husband, realistically portraying the "chauvinistic society in which she [Saleh] lives". She "dispels the male perspectives of love that have traditionally prevailed in Arab culture", clashing the sweet songs of unrequited love with those of self-aware femininity. "She Doesn't Love You" quotes Palestinian poet Mahmoud Darwish, where a woman decides whether she loves the man or not, or perhaps only some aspects of his personality.

== Release ==
A giant mechanical wind-up heart is drawn on the inside cover of the CD.

== Track listing ==
No.	Title	Length
1.	"Beirut Windows (As Janelas De Beirute)"	4:03
2.	"She Doesn't Love You (Ela Não Te Ama)"	4:15
3.	"A Few Images (Algumas Imagens)"	3:50
4.	"Every Time You Go (Toda Vez Que Você Vai)"	4:11
5.	"A Day Is Gone (O Dia Se Foi)"	4:00
6.	"Reda"	2:48
7.	"Those Eyes (Esses Olhos)"	3:29
8.	"No Problem at All (Não Tem Problema Algum)"	5:13
9.	"Hushed Scat (Silêncio)"	2:40
10.	"The Road To Love (A Estrada Para Amor)"	3:32
11.	"A Day Is Gone (O Dia Se Foi) [Instrumental]"	2:55
