= Scent of Reunion: Love Duets Across Civilizations =

Studio album by Mahsa Vahdat and Mighty Sam McClain
- Released: 11 May 2010
- Genre: Iranian, World, Soul, Blues
- Language: English, Persian
- Label: Valley Entertainment
- Producer: Erik Hillestad

Scent of Reunion: Love Duets Across Civilizations is an album by Mahsa Vahdat and Mighty Sam McClain, which was originally released in Europe by Kirkelig Kulturverksted in late 2009 and then on May 11, 2010, in North America by Valley Entertainment.

== Track listing ==
No.	Title	Length
1.	"Meditating Over A Photo"	4:22
2.	"Imprints"	6:40
3.	"Ambassador of Hearts"	5:54
4.	"So Blue"	5:52
5.	"Earth"	4:46
6.	"Flowers No One Has Ever Seen"	5:28
7.	"Migratory Bird"	5:01
8.	"Born"	4:41
9.	"My Kingdom Is You"	5:01
10.	"Silent Song"	6:35
