= Mighty Sam McClain =

American R&B and soul singer-songwriter (1943–2015)

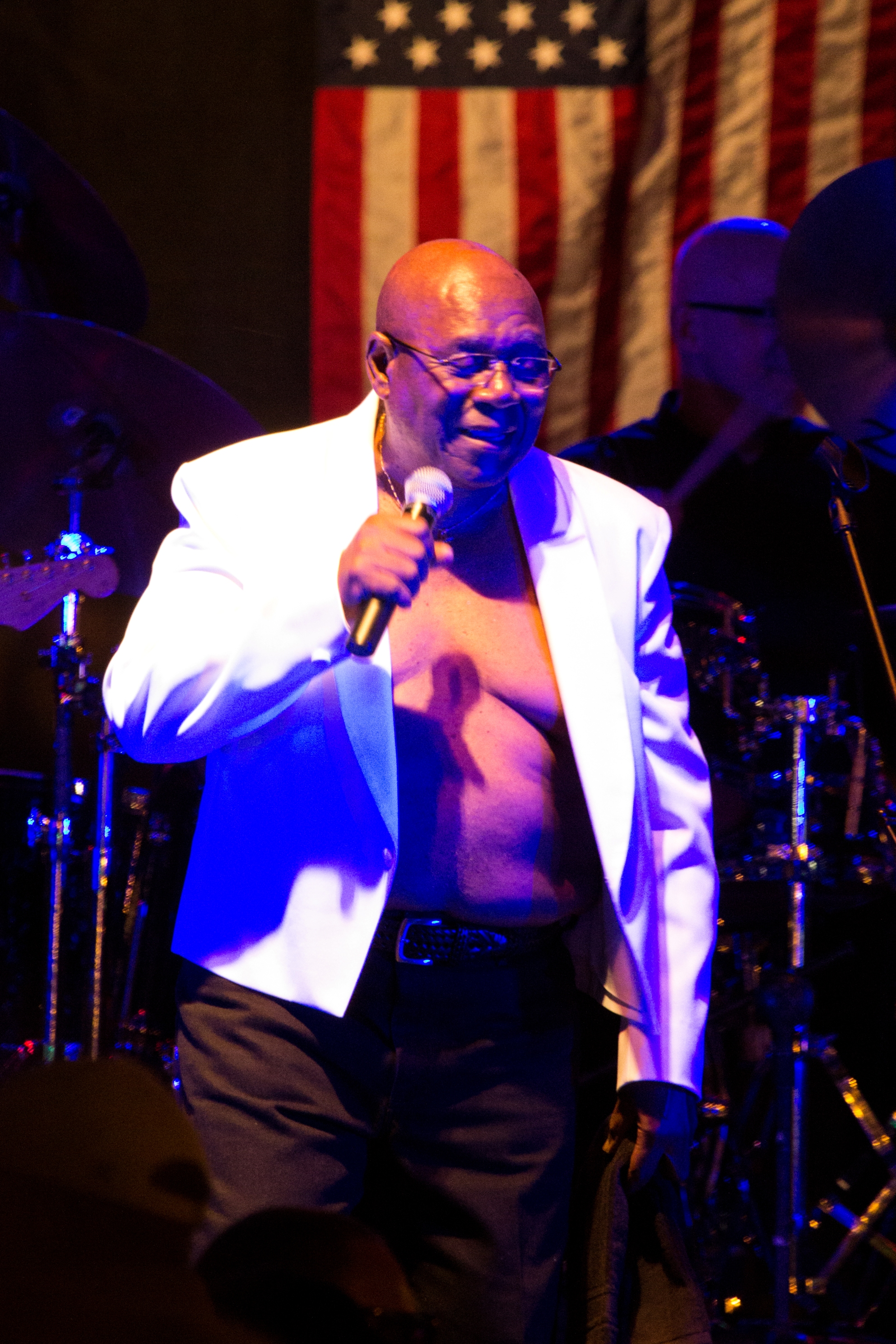
- McClain performing in 2013.

Background information
- Birth name: Samuel McClain
- Also known as: Mighty Sam
- Born: April 15, 1943; Monroe, Louisiana, U.S.
- Died: June 15, 2015 (aged 72); New Hampshire, U.S.
- Genres: R&B, blues, soul
- Occupation: Singer
- Instrument: Vocals
- Years active: 1958–2015

Samuel McClain (April 15, 1943 – June 15, 2015), better known as Mighty Sam early in his career, and later billed as Mighty Sam McClain, was an American soul blues singer and songwriter.

== Life and career ==
He was born in Monroe, Louisiana. As a five-year-old, he began singing in his mother's Gospel Church. McClain left home when he was thirteen and followed local R&B guitarist, Little Melvin Underwood through the Chitlin' Circuit, first as his valet and then as lead vocalist himself at 15.

While singing at the 506 Club in Pensacola, Florida, he was introduced to the record producer and DJ, Papa Don Schroeder and in 1966, McClain recorded a cover version of Patsy Cline's "Sweet Dreams". Several recording sessions at Muscle Shoals produced the further singles, "Fannie-May" and "In the Same Old Way". For 15 years, first in Nashville, Tennessee, then in New Orleans, McClain worked at menial jobs. McClain toured and recorded in Japan in 1989. The end product, Live in Japan, featured Wayne Bennett.

By the early 1990s, McClain relocated to New England through his participation in the "Hubert Sumlin Blues Party" project. This led to Joe Harley and AudioQuest Music and manager, Peter Lembo. The results were the successful releases, Give It Up To Love and Keep On Movin'. After his move to New Hampshire, then followed Sledgehammer Soul and Down Home Blues. In 1998 McClain had two releases, Journey and Joy & Pain on the CrossCut Records label. Soul Survivor: The Best of Mighty Sam McClain was his farewell to AudioQuest in 1999. McClain signed on with the Telarc Blues in 1999, taking his longtime producer Joe Harley with him, and recorded the Blues Music Award nominated Blues for the Soul (2000) and Sweet Dreams (2001).

In 1996, McClain formed McClain Productions after successfully co-producing his albums with Joe Harley. He also created his own record label, Mighty Music, which released One More Bridge To Cross in February 2003. Betcha Didn't Know was issued in July 2009 on Mighty Music. It was nominated by the Blues Association as 'Soul/Blues Album 2010'.

In 2008, McClain joined the 'Give US Your Poor' project, benefiting the homeless. He also co-wrote with the saxophonist Scott Shetler, "Show Me the Way". He continued to work with this project, performing at both the Lincoln Center for the Performing Arts in New York City, and at The Kennedy Center in Washington, D.C., and other venues, sharing the stage with Natalie Merchant, and Mario Frangoulis. In early 2009, McClain recorded an album of duets with the Iranian folk singer, Mahsa Vahdat. The resulting album, Scent of Reunion: Love Duets Across Civilizations reached No. 6 in the European World Music Chart.

McClain and the guitarist for this project, Knut Reiersrud, collaborated on One Drop is Plenty that was recorded in Norway in January 2011. Also, McClain sung the theme song for the film, Time and Charges. "Find the Sun" was written by Thompson and Joe Deleault, and McClain appeared in a cameo role in the film singing the song.

McClain recorded Too Much Jesus (Not Enough Whiskey) in 2012. The following year the title song, "Too Much Jesus (Not Enough Whiskey)," written by McClain and Pat Herlehy, was nominated for a Blues Music Award in the 'Best Song' category.

In 2014 McClain was featured on the compilation Songs from a Stolen Spring that paired Western musicians with artists from the Arab Spring. On the album McClain performed "If I Can Dream" - a Walter Earl Brown song made famous by Elvis Presley. The performance was meshed with "Bread, Freedom" by the Egyptian musician Ramy Essam who is best known for his appearances in Tahrir Square in Cairo during the Egyptian Revolution of 2011.

McClain lost a long battle with colon cancer and died on June 15, 2015.

== Discography ==
Title	Year	Record label
Your Perfect Companion	1986	Orleans Records
Live in Japan	1988	Orleans Records
Give It Up To Love	1992	Sledgehammer Blues
Keep On Movin	1995	Sledgehammer Blues
Sledgehammer Soul and Down Home Blues'	1996	Sledgehammer Blues
Journey	1998	Sledgehammer Blues
Joy & Pain	1998	Ruf
Soul Survivor: The Best of Mighty Sam McClain	1999	Sledgehammer Blues
Blues For The Soul	2000	Telarc Distribution
Sweet Dreams	2001	Telarc Distribution
One More Bridge To Cross	2003	Mighty Music
Betcha Didn't Know	2009	Mighty Music
Scent of Reunion: Love Duets Across Civilizations with Mahsa Vahdat	2010	Kirkelig Kulturverksted/Valley Entertainment
One Drop Is Plenty with Knut Reiersrud	2011	Kirkelig Kulturverksted/Valley Entertainment
A Deeper Tone of Longing: Love Duets Across Civilizations with Mahsa Vahdat	2012	Kirkelig Kulturverksted/Valley Entertainment
Too Much Jesus (Not Enough Whiskey)	2012	Mighty Music
Songs from a Stolen Spring (compilation) with Ramy Essam	2014	Kirkelig Kulturverksted/Valley Entertainment
Tears of the World, (with Knut Reiersrud)	2015	Kirkelig Kulturverksted/Valley Entertainment
Time and Change - Last Recordings	2016	Kirkelig Kulturverksted/Valley Entertainment}
A Diamond in the Rough	2018	Sledgehammer Blues
