= SKRUK =

Choir based in Norway

- Choir
- Origin: Norway
- Founded: 1973
- Genre: Christian; Norwegian folk; spirituals; world; jazz
- Members: ca 50
- Chief conductor: Per Oddvar Hildre
- Website: skruk.com

SKRUK is a Norwegian choir which has toured all over the country and many parts of the world for 50 years with its conductor, Per Oddvar Hildre. It was founded in 1973.

The choir has released more than 25 records over the years, all of them at the record label Kirkelig Kulturverksted. SKRUK has also been nominated three times for the Norwegian music award Spellemannsprisen.

SKRUK has a varied repertoire, influenced by Norwegian folk music, spirituals, world music, and jazz, and has collaborated with many musicians, including Tord Gustavsen, Henning Sommerro, Mahsa Vahdat, The Brazz Brothers, and Brilliant Dadashova. Erik Hillestad at Kirkelig Kulturverksted has also been a close collaborator through many years, including with lyrics and as record producer.
