= I'm the Man (Sherman Robertson album) =

Studio album by Sherman Robertson
- Released: 1994
- Recorded: February 1993
- Studio: Chipping Norton
- Genre: Blues, soul
- Label: Code Blue/Atlantic
- Producer: Mike Vernon

Sherman Robertson chronology
I'm the Man (1994)	Here & Now (1996)

I'm the Man is the debut album by the American musician Sherman Robertson, released in 1994. It was initially released by Indigo Recordings, in 1993. Robertson supported the album with European and North American tours.

== Production ==
Recorded at Chipping Norton Recording Studios in February 1993, the album was produced by Mike Vernon, and was the first release on his Code Blue imprint. Robertson later stated that he did not care for the production. Robertson had previously spent time playing guitar in the bands of Clifton Chenier, Rockin' Dopsie, and Terrance Simien, but missed playing blues. It was important to Robertson that the lyrics to some of his songs concern more carefree and upbeat themes. "Am I Losing You?" is a cover of the Cate Brothers song.

== Critical reception ==
Professional ratings
Review scores
Source	Rating
AllMusic	4/5 stars
Chicago Tribune	3/4 stars

The Edmonton Journal wrote that "the double-time pulse of his music owes more to Louisiana shuffles than the 1-4-5 progression of Chicago blues." The Chicago Tribune noted that, "instead of utilizing Gulf Coast grooves, Vernon furnishes his charge with pop-slanted material reminiscent of Robert Cray's crossover strategy that adeptly showcases Robertson's soulful vocals." The Guardian determined that Robertson "has a pleasant, easy vocal style and he's a technically accomplished guitarist, but there's no real soul or depth to his work, proficient as he may be."

The Times opined that I'm the Man falls "rather too neatly into the upmarket, blues-with-soul niche carved to such endlessly resounding effect by Robert Cray." The St. Petersburg Times advised: "Imagine Albert King doing Albert Collins, and you're in the ballpark." The Sun-Sentinel concluded that, "both mellow and blistering, Robertson can sing a blue streak to match his fluid, rhythmic playing."

AllMusic wrote that "I'm the Man is a fine album of electric blues and bluesy soul that underscores the singer/guitarist's Houston, TX, upbringing."

== Track listing ==
No.	Title	Length
1.	"I'm Your Man"
2.	"Somebody's Messin'"
3.	"Am I Losing You?"
4.	"Special Kind of Loving"
5.	"Make It Rain"
6.	"Out of Sight Out of Mind"
7.	"Linda Lou"
8.	"Home of the Blues"
9.	"Our Good Thing Is Through"
10.	"Vacating the Blues"
11.	"Helping Hand"
12.	"Take a Message"
