= Rim Banna =

Palestinian singer (1966–2018)

Rim Banna ريم بنا
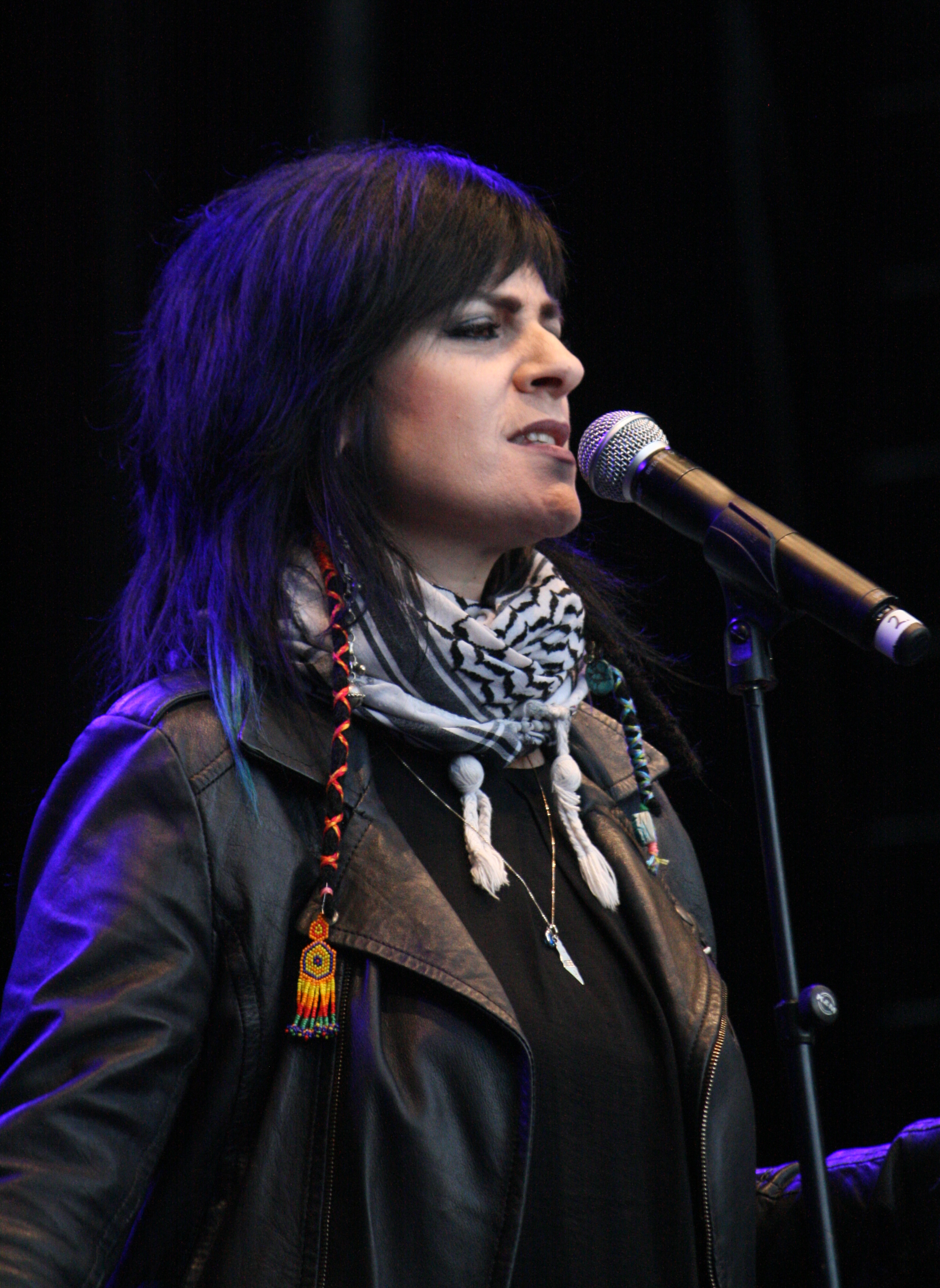
- Rim Banna in Oslo, 2014

Background information
- Born: 8 December 1966; Nazareth, Israel
- Died: 24 March 2018 (aged 51) Nazareth, Israel
- Occupations: Singer; composer
- Years active: 1985–2017
- Spouse: Leonid Alexeyenko (m. 1991; div. 2010)

Rim Banna (Arabic: ريم بنا; 8 December 1966 – 24 March 2018) was a Palestinian singer and composer most known for her modern interpretations of traditional Palestinian songs and poetry. Banna was born in Nazareth, where she graduated from Nazareth Baptist School.

She lived in Nazareth with her three children. She met her husband, Ukrainian guitarist Leonid Alexeyenko, while studying music together at the Higher Music Conservatory in Moscow. They married in 1991 and got divorced in 2010.

== Artistic career ==
Banna first achieved popularity in the early 1990s, after recording her own versions of traditional Palestinian children's songs that were on the verge of being forgotten. Many such songs and rhymes sung by Palestinian families again today are said to be thanks to Banna's work in preserving them via her recordings.

Banna composed her own songs, adding melody to Palestinian poetry. Her message was often focused on the suffering of Palestinians, particularly those of the West Bank. Her music has been described as "haunting, emotional, at times bordering on kitsch." She described her music as a means of cultural self-assertion:

A part of our work consists of collecting traditional Palestinian texts without melodies. So that the texts do not get lost, we try to compose melodies for them that are modern, yet inspired by traditional Palestinian music.

In this way, Banna did more than mimic the traditional techniques and representations of the pieces she interprets. She blended them with modern singing styles because,

Oriental singing techniques are mostly ornamental… But my voice is more two-dimensional, thicker. I try to write songs that fit my voice. I want to create something new in every respect. And that includes bringing people elsewhere closer to the music and soul of the Palestinians.

She performed live in the West Bank and reached audiences in Gaza through live webcasts. She performed her first concert in Syria on 8 January 2009 and also performed in Tunisia on 25 July 2011. Her first concert in Beirut took place on 22 March 2012.

== European audience ==
=== Lullabies from the Axis of Evil ===
Banna's popularity in Europe began after Norwegian music producer Erik Hillestad invited her to participate on the CD Lullabies from the Axis of Evil (2003) and Norwegian singer Kari Bremnes, who also took part in this production in a duet with Banna, invited her to Oslo. Banna accepted the invitation, and the two artists did a show together.

The album, dubbed "a musical antiwar message to U.S. President Bush from female singers in Palestine, Iraq, Iran, and Norway," brings these women together with others from North Korea, Syria, Cuba, and Afghanistan, to sing traditional lullabies from their lands in duet form with English-language performers whose translation allows the songs to reach a Western audience.

=== Mirror of My Soul ===
The Mirrors of My Soul, which was dedicated to all the Palestinian and Arab political detainees in Israeli prisons, is a stylistic departure from her previous body of work. Produced in cooperation with a Norwegian quintet, it features "Western pop styling" fused with Middle Eastern modal and vocal structures, and Arabic lyrics. Though the style differs from previous recordings, the subject matter has basically remained constant. The album includes "songs of despair and hope" about the lives of "a struggling people, and even a song about late Palestinian leader and PA president Arafat in a way that is both thoughtful and subtle".

== Discography ==
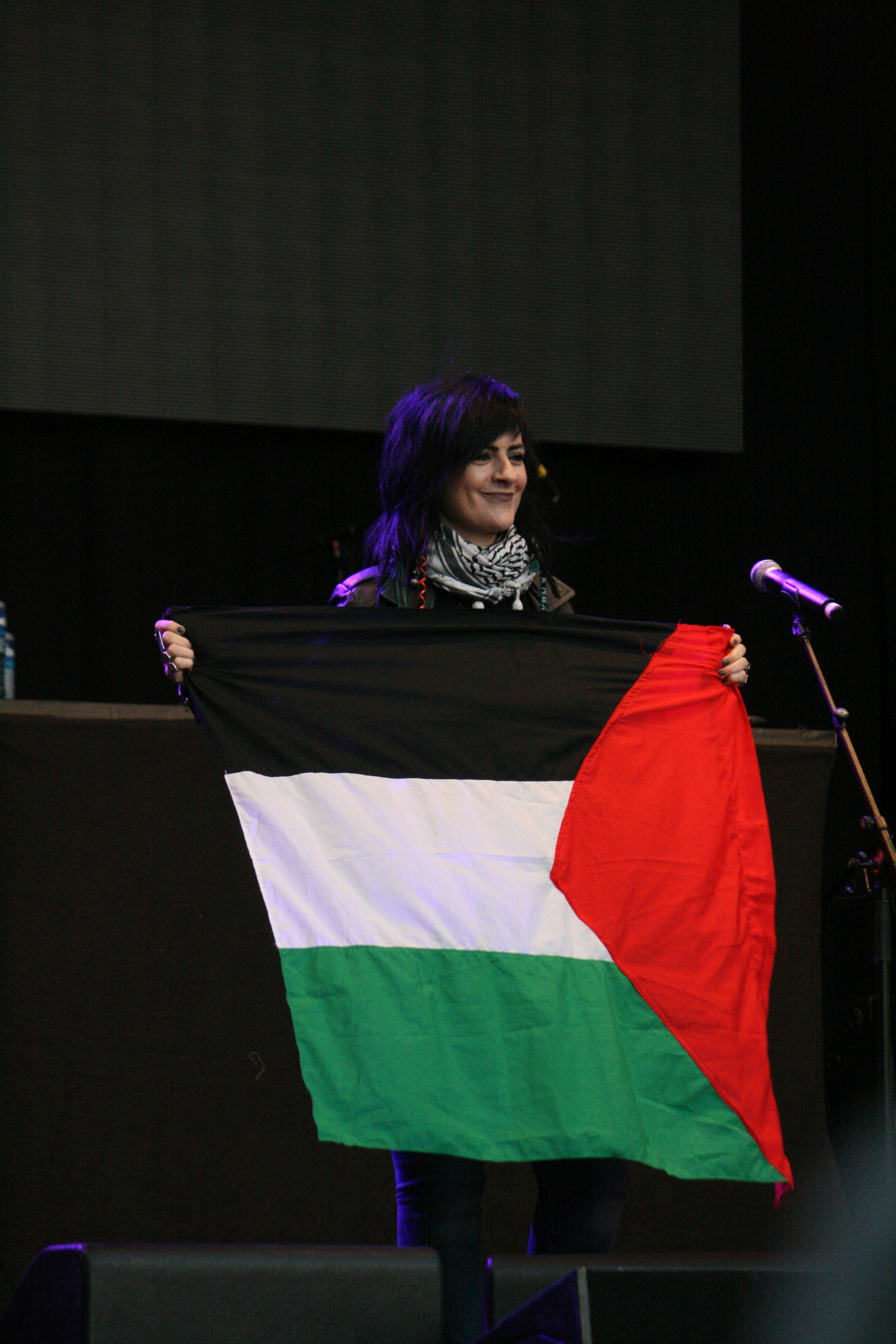
Banna in 2014

- Jafra (1985)
- Your tears Mother (1986)
- The Dream (1993)
- New Moon (1995)
- Mukaghat (1996)
- Al Quds Everlasting (2002)
- Krybberom (2003) Rim Banna & SKRUK (2003, Kirkelig Kulturverksted)
- Lullabies from the Axis of Evil (2003, Kirkelig Kulturverksted – Various female artists)
- The Mirrors of My Soul (2005, Kirkelig Kulturverksted, US distribution: Valley Entertainment)
- This was not my story (2006) Rim Banna & Henrik Koitz
- Seasons of violet (2007, Kirkelig Kulturverksted)
- Songs across Walls of Separation (2008 Kirkelig Kulturverksted – Various artists from the Middle East, Africa, Central America, North America, and Europe)
- April Blossoms (2009, Kirkelig Kulturverksted) an album for children, was dedicated to the children martyrs in Gaza
- A Time to cry (2010, Kirkelig Kulturverksted), was recorded in one of Sheikh Jarrah's houses which is under a constant threat to be evicted from the part of their house (with 3 Palestinian singers)
- "Tomorrow" (Bokra) 2011, a single song of the American legend composer Quincy Jones, who chose Rim Banna to represent Palestine in this project which will be released in an Album and a video clip in September 2011
- Revelation of Ecstasy and Rebellion (2013, Kirkelig Kulturverksted), Produced by Bugge Wesseltoft
- Songs from a Stolen Spring (2014, Kirkelig Kulturverksted [US distribution: Valley Entertainment] - Various Artists), featuring "Break Your Fears"

== Death ==
Banna died in her hometown of Nazareth on 24 March 2018, at age 51, following a nine-year struggle with breast cancer.
