= Geirr Lystrup =

Norwegian singer and writer (1949–2025)

- Born: 22 March 1949; Vinje Municipality, Norway
- Died: 19 June 2025 (aged 76)
- Occupations: Singer, poet, playwright and children's writer
- Relatives: Erik Hillestad (brother-in-law)
- Awards: Spellemannprisen (1981, 1988); Prøysenprisen (1987)

Geirr Lystrup (22 March 1949 – 19 June 2025) was a Norwegian singer, poet, playwright and children's writer.

== Life and career ==
Lystrup was born in Vinje Municipality on 22 March 1949. His debut album was Ti på taket og Måltrostblues from 1972. His album Songen om kjærligheta from 1981 (a cooperation with Det Norske Kammerkor) was awarded Spellemannprisen. He was awarded Prøysenprisen in 1987. He played with the music group Godtfolk, and their first album Egg og Champagne from 1988 was awarded Spellemannprisen. Among his plays is Brakar og Joanna, staged at Riksteatret at its 50th anniversary in 1999. Lystrup died from complications of ALS on 19 June 2025, at the age of 76. His funeral service was held in Brumunddal Church on 27 June.
