= Amman Design Week =

Biennial event in Amman, Jordan

Amman Design Week أسبوع عمّان للتصميم
- Genre: Biennale
- Venue: Amman
- Country: Jordan
- Inaugurated: 2016
- Founders: Rana Beiruti and Abeer Seikaly
- Patrons: Queen Rania Al Abdullah
- Website: ammandesignweek.com

Amman Design Week (Arabic: أسبوع عمّان للتصميم) is a design biennale held in Amman, Jordan, co-founded in 2016 by Rana Beiruti and Abeer Seikaly through an initiative of Queen Rania Al Abdullah.

== Editions ==
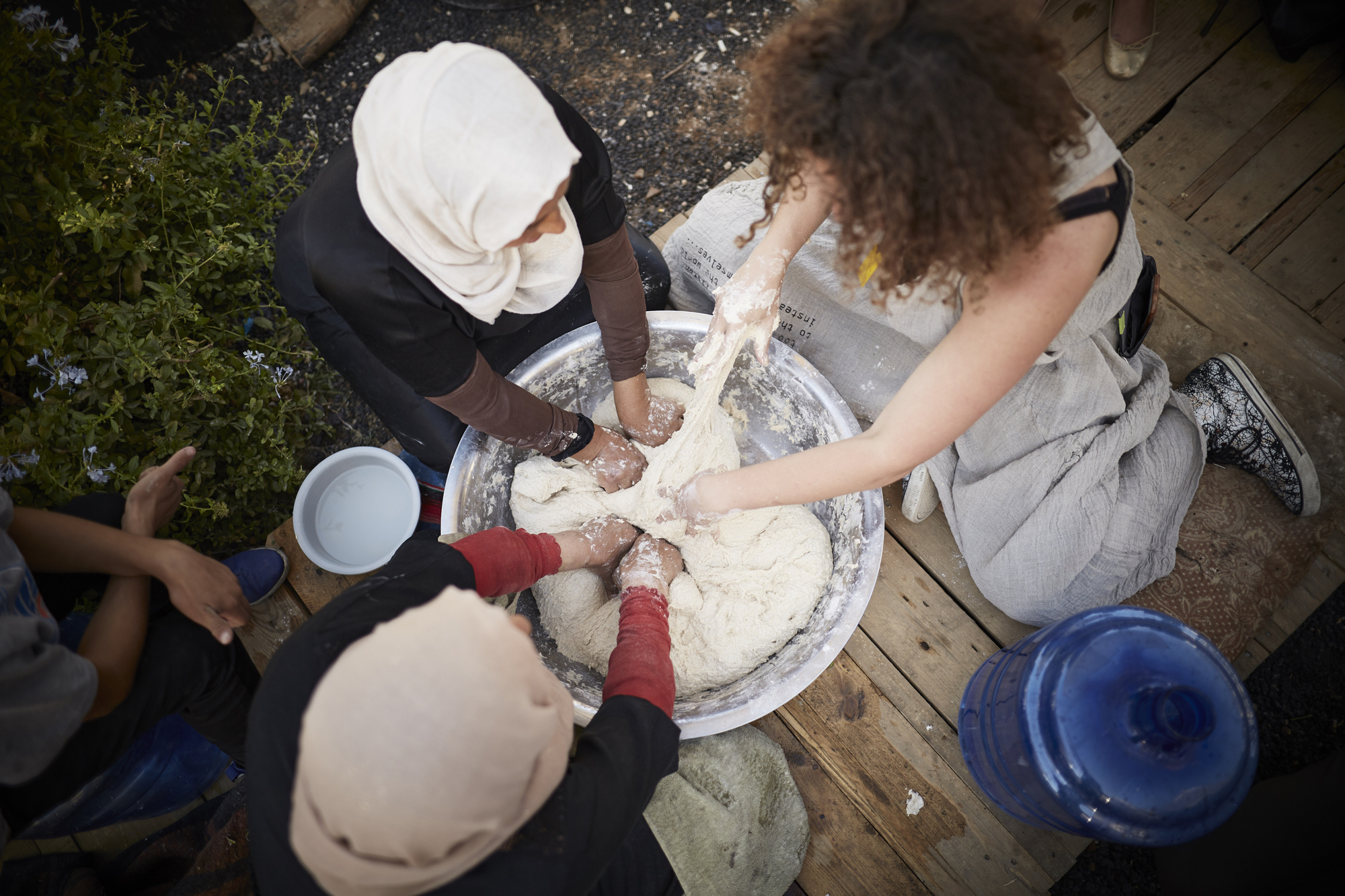
The crafts district in the exhibition of 2017

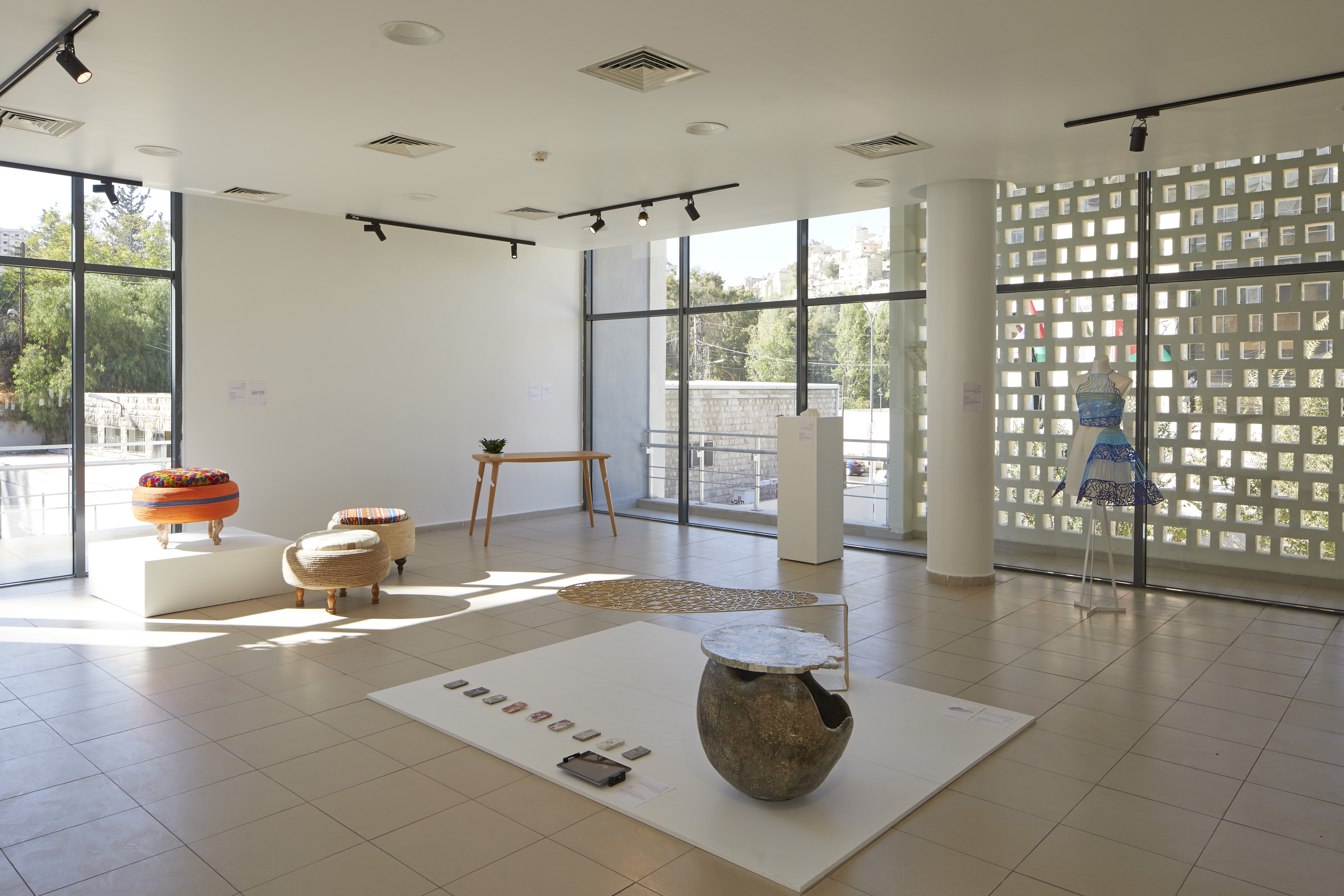
The student exhibition, part of Amman Design Week 2019

The biennale has ran three editions, which are the 2016 Edition: Huna Al Tasmeem (English: This is Design; Arabic: هنا التصميم), the 2017 Edition: Design Moves Life Moves Design, and the 2019 Edition: Possibilities

== Gallery ==
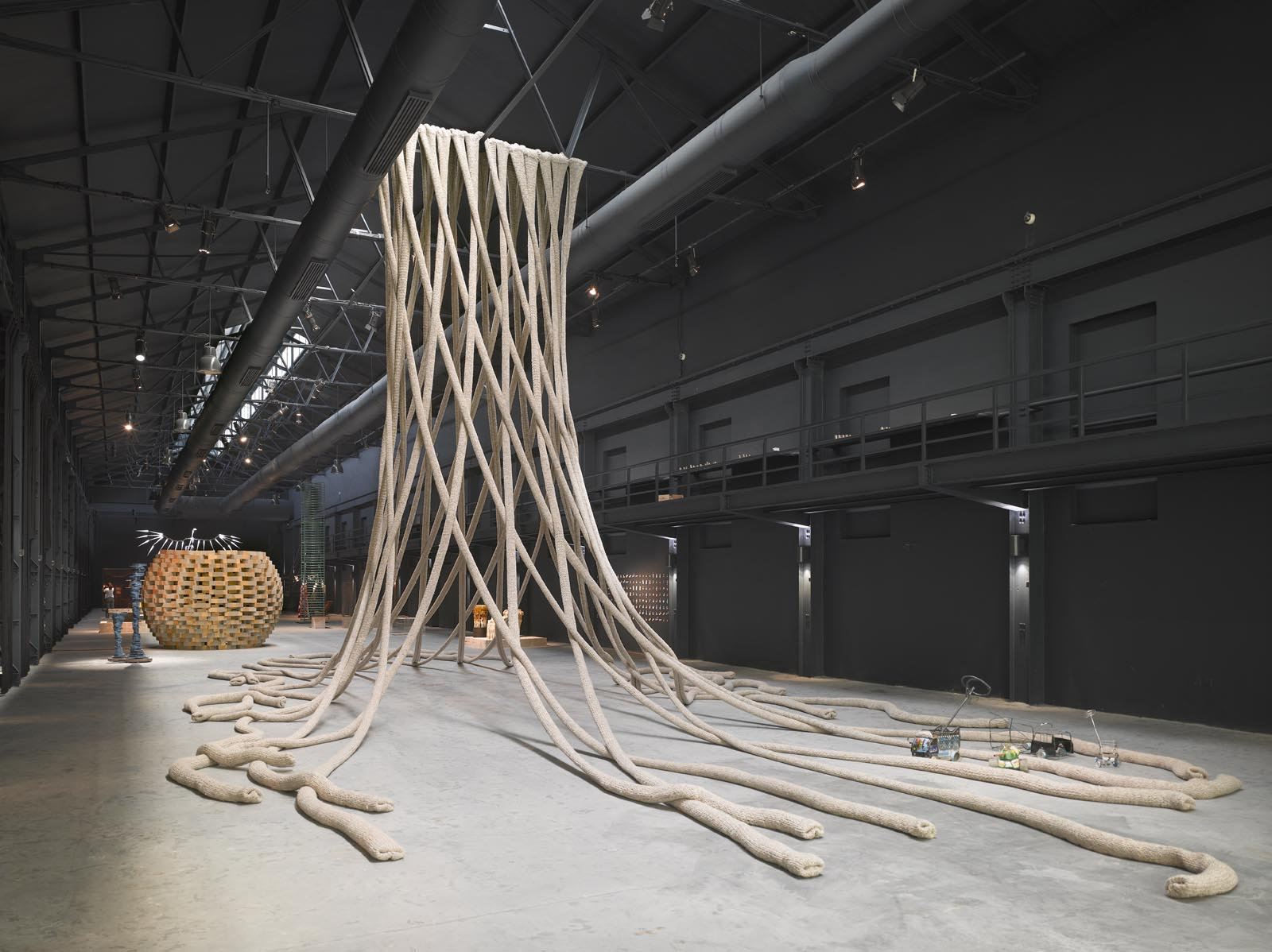
The Hangar Exhibition 2016 curated by Sahel Alhiyari

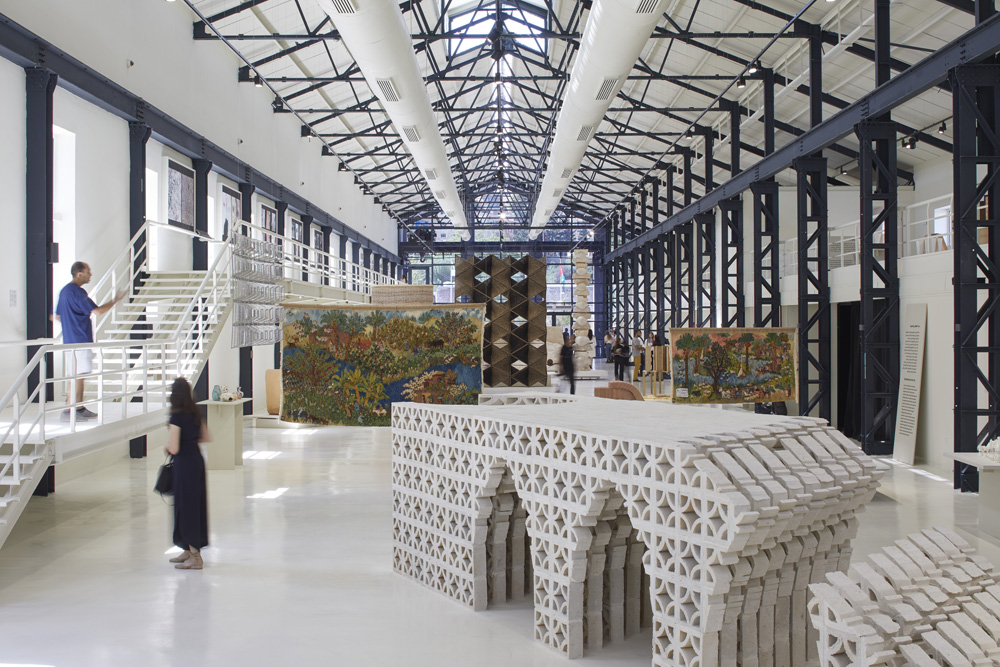
The Hangar Exhibition 2019 curated by Noura Al Sayeh-Holtrop

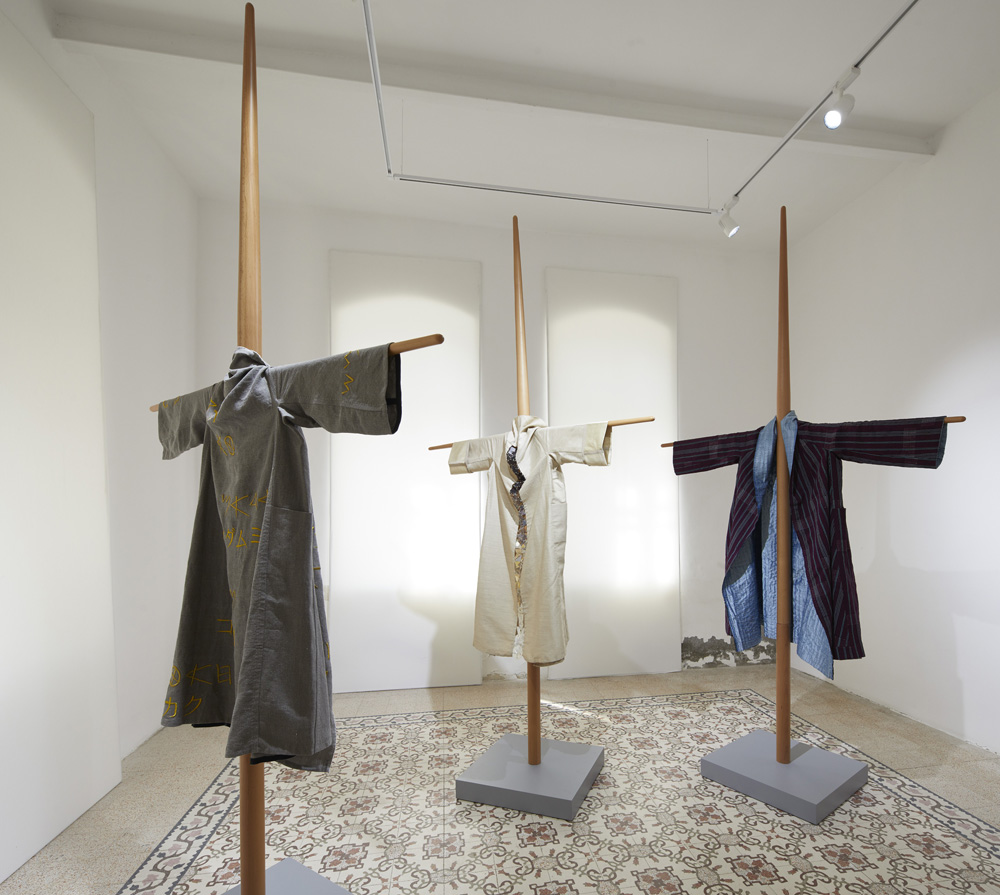
Jordan Script Routes - exhibition curated by Huda AbiFares

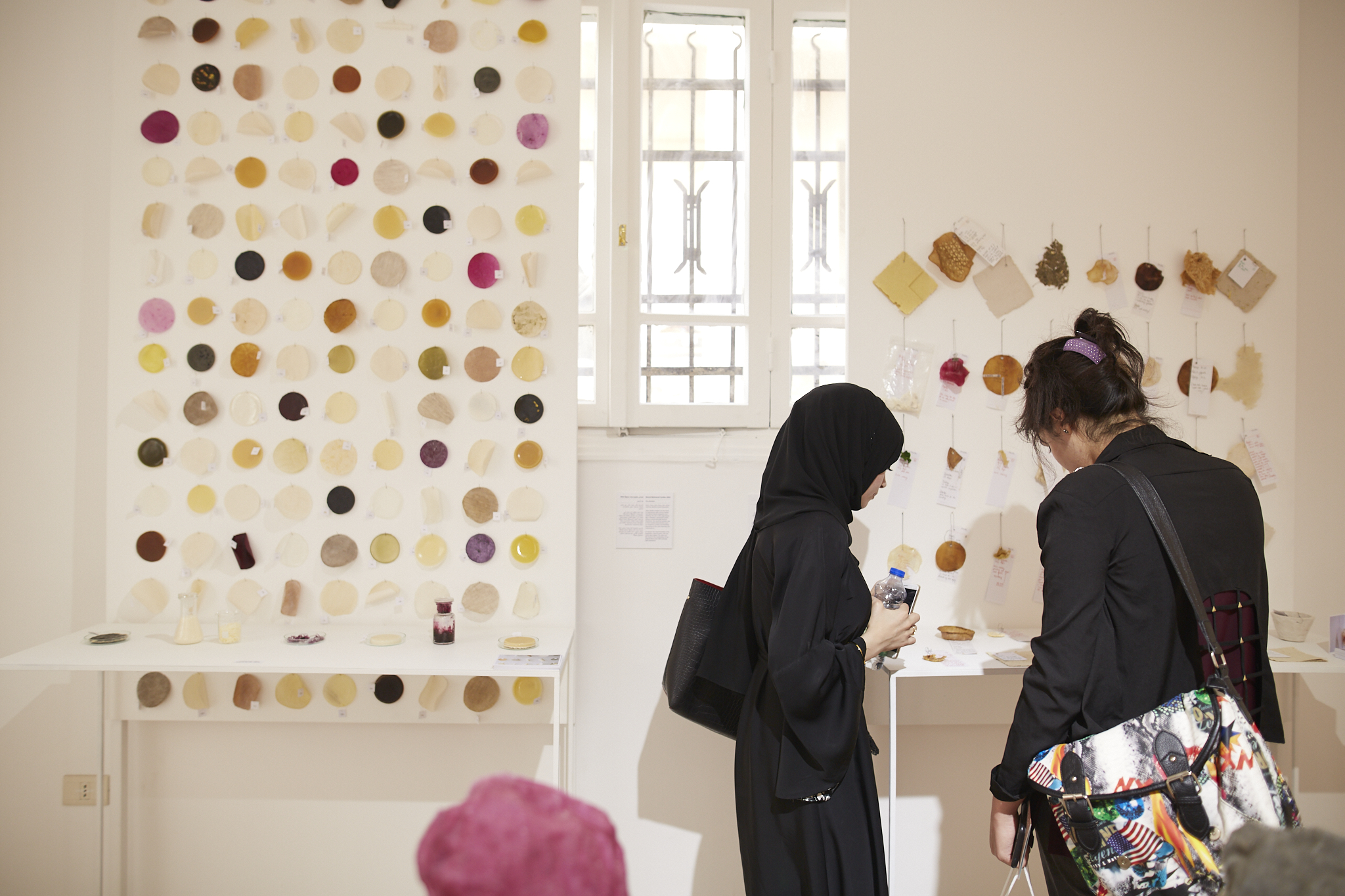
Material Innovation Exhibition as part of Amman Design Week 2019

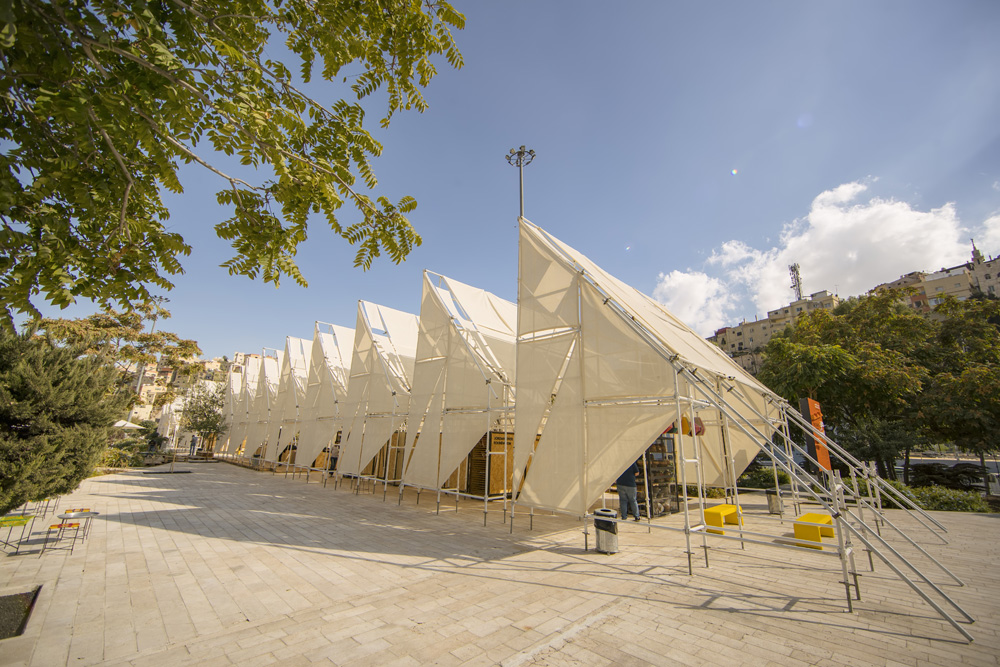
The Stream, 2017 - Designed by Dina Haddadin

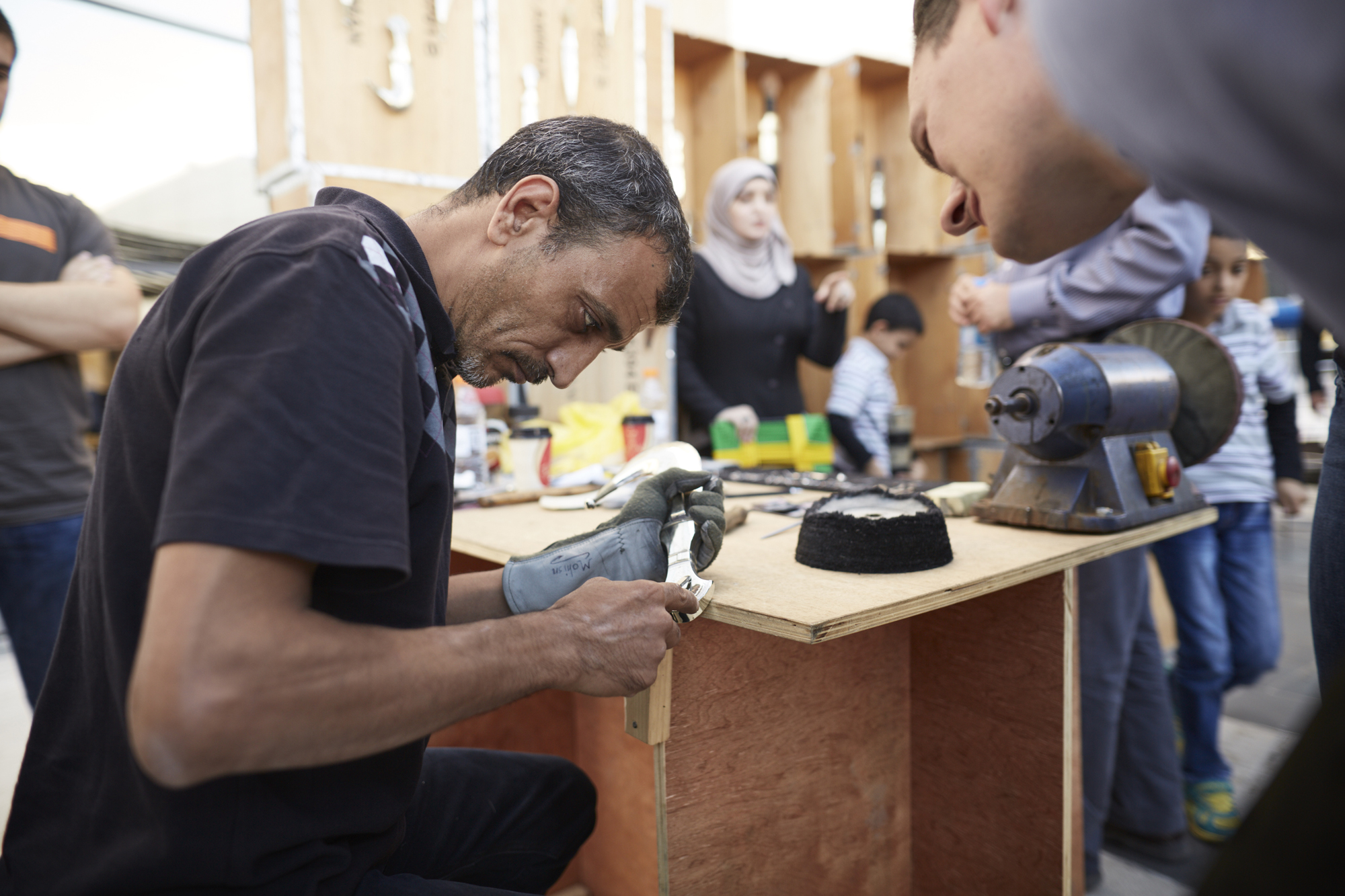
The Crafts District exhibition, 2017
