= Sherman Robertson =

American blues musician (1948–2021)

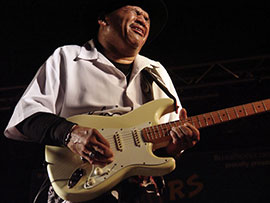
- Robertson performing in 2005

Background information
- Born: October 27, 1948; Breaux Bridge, Louisiana, U.S.
- Died: January 28, 2021 (aged 72)
- Genres: Blues
- Occupation: Musician
- Instrument(s): Guitar, vocals
- Years active: 1980s–2012
- Labels: Atlantic/Code Blue Records, Sledgehammer Blues/AudioQuest Music, various
- Website: shermanrobertsonmusic.com

Sherman Robertson (October 27, 1948 – January 28, 2021) was an American blues guitarist and singer who has been described as "one part zydeco, one part swamp blues, one part electric blues and one part classic rhythm and blues."

== Biography ==
Robertson was born in Breaux Bridge, Louisiana, and raised in Houston, Texas. At the age of 13, he watched a performance on television by Hank Williams. Duly inspired and equipped with a cheap guitar purchased by his father, he started playing the songs previously performed by Freddie King and Floyd London. London resided in the same part of Houston as Robertson. As he lived close to the Duke/Peacock recording studio, Robertson took the opportunity to acquaint himself with some of the musicians who recorded there. At the same time, in his late teens, Robertson played in a band in various bars of his Fifth Ward, Houston neighborhood.

In 1982, Clifton Chenier heard Robertson's band playing at the Crosstown Blues Festival. Robertson moved back to Louisiana, learned to play slide guitar, and toured for several years in the 1980s with Chenier. Robertson contributed to his Live At The (1982) and San Francisco Blues Festival (1985) albums. After Chenier's death, Robertson played with Rockin' Dopsie, appearing on his Crowned Prince Of Zydeco album (1986), and Terrance Simien & the Mallet Playboys, before going solo.

In addition, Robertson's guitar work appeared on Paul Simon's Graceland album, and he was on the bill at the 1994 Notodden Blues Festival.

Robertson's I'm the Man (1994) was the first release on the Code Blue label. It was nominated for a W.C. Handy Award. Robertson's follow-up, Here & Now (1995), included his cover of the Tracy Nelson song "Here & Now". However the record label folded and Robertson re-appeared in 1998 on the independent label, Audioquest, with his next offering, Going Back Home. In November 2005 he released Guitar Man – Live with his new backing band, BluesMove.

In 2008, Robertson and BluesMove played at the Harvest Time Blues festival in Monaghan, Ireland. In 2011, Robertson and BluesMove appeared at the Rhythm Festival in Bedfordshire, England.

In 2012, a proposed concert in Gaildorf, Germany, was canceled after Robertson suffered a stroke. He died in 2021, aged 72.

== Discography ==
- I'm the Man (1994) – Atlantic/Code Blue Records
- Here & Now (1996) – Atlantic/Code Blue Records
- Going Back Home (1998) – Sledgehammer Blues (formerly AudioQuest Music)
- Guitar Man – Live (2005) – Movin Records
