= A Tribute to Someone =

Studio album by Larry Willis Sextet
- Released: 1994
- Recorded: July 13 & 14, 1993
- Studio: Clinton Recording, NYC, NY
- Genre: Jazz
- Length: 52:22
- Label: AudioQuest; AQ-CD1022
- Producer: Joe Harley

Larry Willis chronology
Unforgettable: Piano Solos (1992)	A Tribute to Someone (1994)	Serenade (1995)

'A Tribute to Someone" is an album by American jazz pianist [Larry Willis] recorded on July 13 & 14, 1993 at Studio Clinton Recording, NYC, NY Genre Jazz,Hard Bop Length 52:22 Label AudioQuest AQ-CD1022 and originally released on AudioQuest in 1994. AQ-CD1022 180 grams Vinyl later on was reissued in the US on [Evidence Music] in 1998.

== Reception ==
Professional ratings
Review scores
Source	Rating
Allmusic	4.5/5 stars

Allmusic's Ken Dryden said: "Larry Willis has never achieved the acclaim that he deserves, but these rewarding 1993 studio sessions for Audioquest, which serve as a tribute to his old friend Herbie Hancock, represent some of his best work as a leader. Willis is clearly his own man, as he makes no attempt to mimic Hancock's keyboard style".

== Track listing ==
All compositions by Larry Willis except where noted

1. "King Cobra" (Herbie Hancock) – 7:06
2. "Wayman's Way" – 7:39
3. "Sensei" – 6:24
4. "Tribute to Someone" (Hancock) – 9:07
5. "Maiden Voyage" (Hancock) – 7:06
6. "For Jean" – 6:53
7. "Teasdale Place" – 8:07

== Personnel ==
- Larry Willis – piano
- Tom Williams – trumpet
- Curtis Fuller – trombone
- John Stubblefield – tenor saxophone, soprano saxophone
- David Williams – bass
- Ben Riley – drums
