= Sledgehammer Blues =

- Parent company: Valley Entertainment
- Founded: 1990
- Founder: Joe Harley
- Genre: Blues, jazz
- Country of origin: U.S.
- Location: New York City
- Official website: Valley-Entertainment

Sledgehammer Blues is an audiophile record label owned by Valley Entertainment. It was formerly named AudioQuest Music.

Audioquest Music was founded in 1990 by Joe Harley of the audio cable company Audioquest to demonstrate the quality of its cables. Harley made one album, by blues guitarist Robert Lucas, that was so successful he decided to release more jazz and blues. Its catalogue included work by Charles Fambrough, Victor Lewis, James Newton, Edward Simon, and Larry Willis.

From the label's website: "The blues label was founded in the late 1980s with the mission to create the highest standard audiophile recordings based on the technology available. These are analog recordings using custom built tube electronics and eschewing noise reduction, compression, equalization or sound limiters. By recording the most proficient artists available at the highest possible standards, these recordings have been adapted to every subsequent audiophile platform-XRCD, SACD, etc."

== Discography ==
Selection Number	Artist	Album
2-AQM-1001	Robert Lucas	Usin' Man Blues
2-AQM-1002	Strunz & Farah	Misterio
2-AQM-1003	Tuxedo Cowboy	Woman of the Heart
2-AQM-1004	Robert Lucas	Luke and the Locomotives
2-AQM-1005	Trio Galanterie	Eighteenth Century Music for Lute and Strings
2-AQM-1006	Mokave	Volume 1
2-AQM-1007	Mokave	Volume 2
2-AQM-1008	Various Artists	Works of Art, Volume 1
2-AQM-1009	Larry Willis	Steal Away
2-AQM-1010	Victor Lewis	Family Portrait
2-AQM-1011	Robert Lucas	Built for Comfort
2-AQM-1012	Bruce Katz	Crescent Crawl
2-AQM-1013	Sasha Matson	Steel Chords
2-AQM-1014	Jeff Palmer	Ease On
2-AQM-1015	Mighty Sam McClain	Give It Up to Love
2-AQM-1016	Various Artists	Works of Art Volume 2
2-AQM-1017	Bennie Wallace	The Old Songs
2-AQM-1018	Ronnie Earl and The Broadcasters	Still River
2-AQM-1019	Les Arbuckle	No More No Les
2-AQM-1020	Rob Mullins	One Night in Houston
2-AQM-1021	Robert Lucas	Layaway
2-AQM-1022	Larry Willis	A Tribute to Someone
2-AQM-1023	James Newton Ensemble	Suite for Frida Kahlo
2-AQM-1024	Mokave	Afrique
2-AQM-1025	Edward Simon Group	Beauty Within
2-AQM-1026	Bruce Katz	Transformation
2-AQM-1027	Doug MacLeod	Come To Find
2-AQM-1028	Kei Akagi	Mirror Puzzle
2-AQM-1029	Various Artists	Works of Art Volume 3
2-AQM-1030	David Binney	The Luxury of Guessing
2-AQM-1031	Mighty Sam McClain	Keep On Movin'
2-AQM-1032	The Bush Crew	The Bush Crew
2-AQM-1033	Charles Fambrough	Keeper of the Spirit
2-AQM-1034	Various Artists	Blues Masters
2-AQM-1035	Various Artists	Jazz Masters
2-AQM-1036	Joey Calderazzo	Secrets
2-AQM-1037	Lloyd Jones	Trouble Monkey
2-AQM-1038	Terry Evans	Puttin' It Down
2-AQM-1039	Joe Beard	Blues Union
2-AQM-1041	Doug MacLeod	You Can't Take My Blues
2-AQM-1042	Mighty Sam McClain	Sledgehammer Soul and Down Home Blues
2-AQM-1043	Ronnie Earl, Pinetop Perkins, Willie "Big Eyes" Smith and Calvin "Fuzz" Jones	Eye to Eye
2-AQM-1044	Terry Evans	Come to the River
2-AQM-1045	Robert Lucas	Completely Blue
2-AQM-1046	Doug MacLeod	Unmarked Road
2-AQM-1047	Bruce Katz	Mississippi Moan
2-AQM-1048	Mighty Sam McClain	Journey
2-AQM-1049	Joe Beard featuring Duke Robillard and Friends	For Real
2-AQM-1050	Sherman Robertson	Going Back Home
2-AQM-1051	Bennie Wallace	Bennie Wallace
2-AQM-1052	Various Artists	Bluesquest
2-AQM-1053	Mighty Sam McClain	Soul Survivor
2-AQM-1054	Doug MacLeod	Whose Truth, Whose Lies?
2-AQM-1055	Joe Beard featuring Duke Robillard and Friends	Dealin'
2-AQM-1056	Bruce Katz	Three Feet Off the Ground
2-AQM-1057	Terry Evans	Mississippi Magic
2-AQM-1058	Terry Evans	Live Like a Hurricane
2-AQM-1059	Little Al Thomas & The Crazy House Band	South Side Story
2-AQM-2000	Wolfe	Why Thank You Very Much: Live at The Bluetone Cafe
