= Kulturkirken Jakob =

Church in Oslo, Norway

Coordinates: 59°55′05″N 10°45′16″E

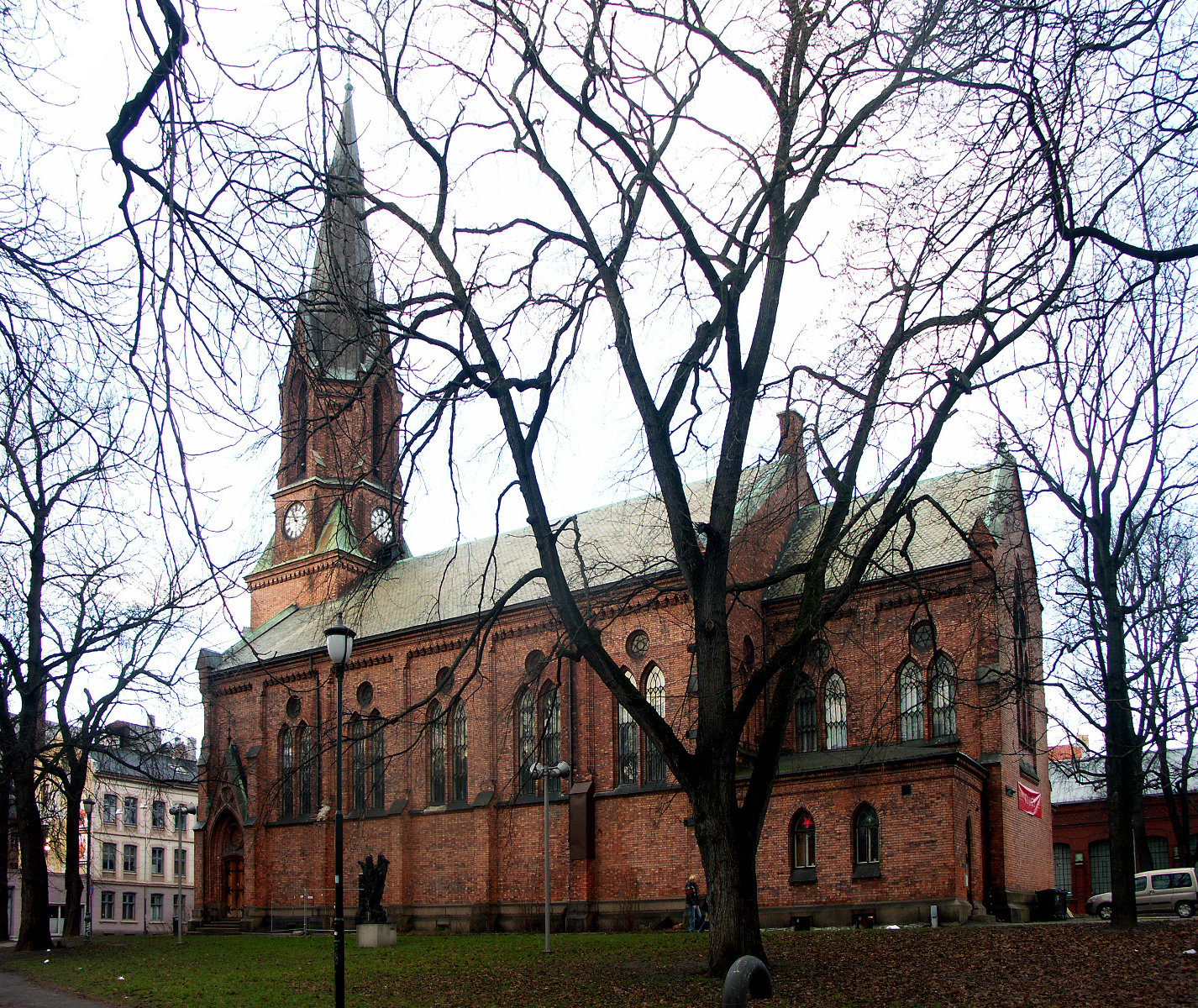
Kulturkirken Jakob

Kulturkirken Jakob (in English St. James Church of Culture) is a church in Oslo, Norway, designed by architect Georg Andreas Bull and built in 1880. The original name of the Church was St James's Church or Jakobs kirke.

The church is named after the Apostle James (the Great), in Norwegian language: Apostelen Jakob.

The altarpiece of the building year by Eilif Peterssen and shows the adoring shepherds. In the porch hangs a relief of the Archangel Michael.

== Church of Culture ==
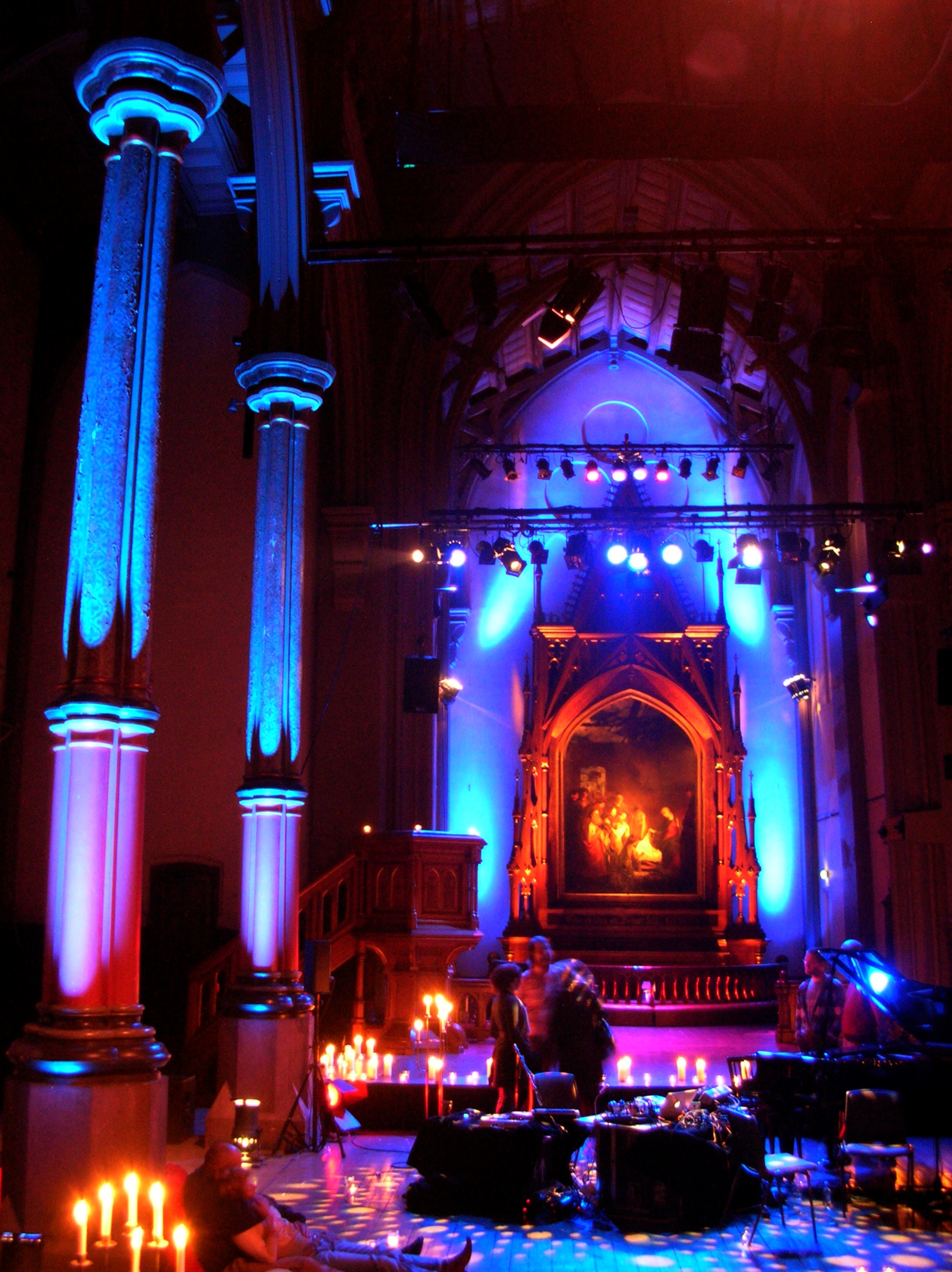
Concert in Kulturkirken Jakob

The church, with 600 seats, served as the parish church of Jakob parish until 1985, when it was closed by the due to building restoration. The church was reopened in February 2000 as a church of culture, directed by Kirkelig Kulturverksted for long term rental of the Church of Norway (Kirkelig Fellesråd) in Oslo.

The church is one of the few pure churches of culture, with performances of theater, dance and other cultural expressions. The basement has showrooms for exhibitions.
