= Kari Bremnes =

Norwegian singer and songwriter

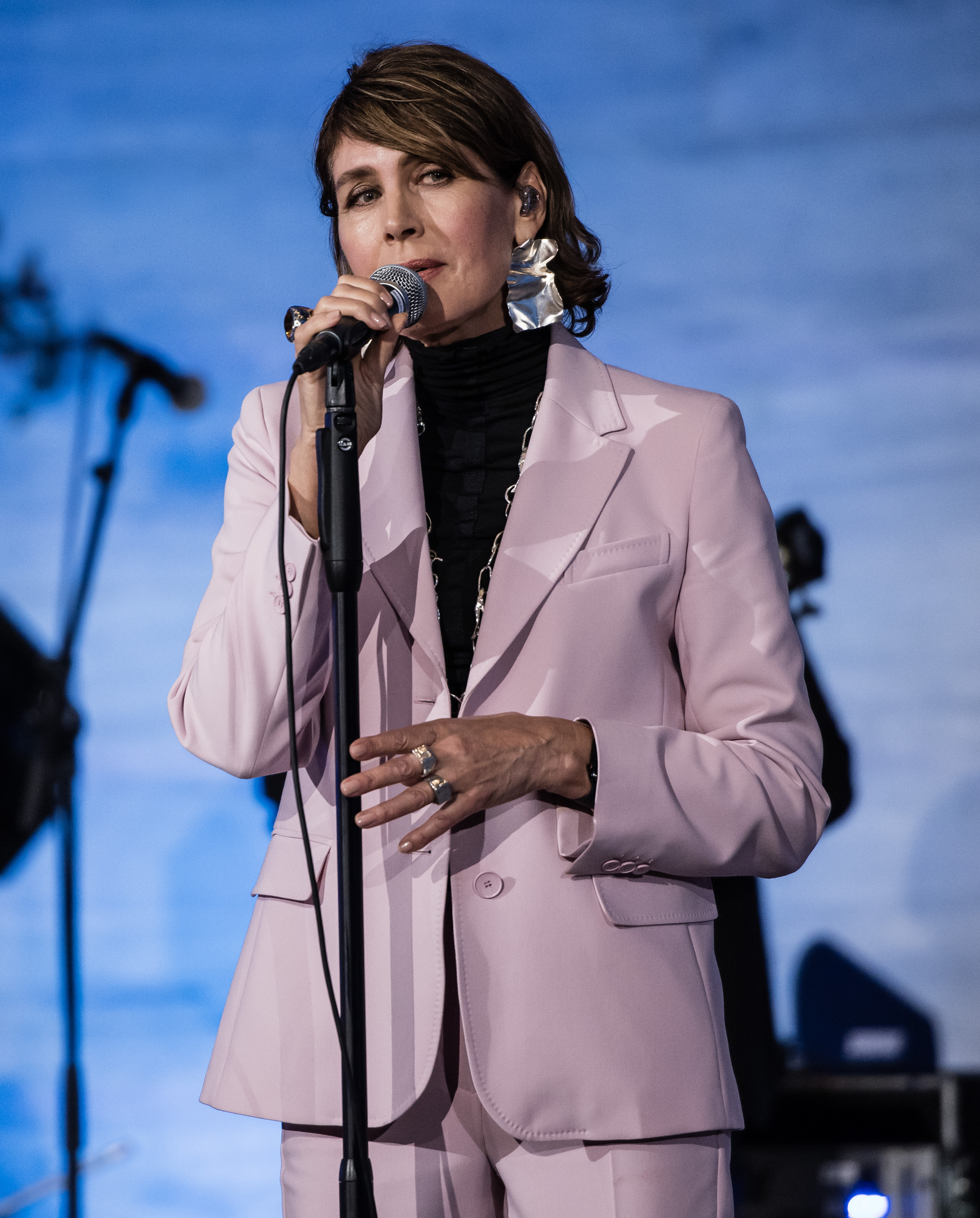
- Kari Bremnes, 2022

Background information
- Born: 9 December 1956 (age 68); Svolvær, Norway
- Occupation(s): singer, songwriter
- Labels: Kirkelig Kulturverksted
- Website: karibremnes.no

Kari Bremnes (born 9 December 1956) is a Norwegian singer and songwriter.

She got an MA in language, literature, history and theatre studies from the University of Oslo, and worked as a journalist for several years before deciding to dedicate herself to music full-time.

In 1987 she received the Spellemann Award (Spellemannprisen) for the record Mitt ville hjerte, and in 1991 for the record Spor. With her two brothers, Lars Bremnes and Ola Bremnes, she received the prize for the record Soløye in 2001.

She was also deputy board chairman of the Norwegian Society of Composers and Lyricists.

== Discography ==
=== Solo ===
- Mitt ville hjerte (My wild heart, 1987)
- Blå krukke (Blue jug, 1989)
- Spor (Trace, 1991)
- Gåte ved Gåte (Riddle beside another riddle, 1994)
- Erindring (Memory, 1995)
- Månestein (Moon stone, 1997)
- Svarta Bjørn (Black bear, 1998)
- Norwegian Mood (2000)
- 11 ubesvarte anrop (11 unanswered calls, 2002)
- You'd Have To Be Here (English version of 11 ubesvarte anrop, 2003)
- Over en by (Over a town, 2005)
- Kari Bremnes live (Reise) (Kari Bremnes live (Journey), 2007)
- Ly (Shelter, 2009)
- Fantastik Allerede (Fantastic Already, 2010)
- Og så kom resten av livet (And then the rest of your life. 2012)
- Det Vi Har (What we have. 2017)

=== With others ===
- Tid å hausta inn (1983, new edition 2001) with Lars Klevstrand.
- Salmer på veien hjem (Psalms on the way home, 1991) with Ole Paus and Mari Boine Persen.
- Ord fra en fjord (Word from a fjord, 1992) with Ola og Lars Bremnes.
- Folk i husan (People in the houses, 1993) with Ola Bremnes and Arne Bendiksen Records.
- Cohen på norsk (Cohen in Norwegian, 1993) with various artists.
- Løsrivelse (Breakaway, 1993) with Ketil Bjørnstad.
- The Man From God Knows Where (1999) with, among others Tom Russell.
- Soløye (Sun eye, 2000) with Ola and Lars Bremnes.
- Desemberbarn (December child, 2001) with Rikard Wolff.
- Voggesanger fra ondskapens akse (Lullabies from the Axis of Evil) (2003) with Eva Dahlgren and Anisette Koppel.

== Also appears on ==
- Beginner's Guide to Scandinavia, 2011 (Nascente/Demon Music Group)
