= Abeer Seikaly =

Jordanian-Canadian architect

Abeer Seikaly is a Palestinian architect who designed a multi-use, disaster shelter for refugees. She lives in Amman Jordan. Seikaly is an architect and designer who has worked for Villa Moda in Kuwait in 2005. She directed the first contemporary art fair in Jordan in 2010.

== Her style of work ==
Seikaly's ‘Weaving a Home’ uses fabric composed of high-strength plastic tubing molded into sine-waves that expand and enclose based on weather conditions; it is easily broken down to allow for mobility and transport. The tent also collects rainwater to be used for basic sanitation like showering, and absorb solar energy that is stored as electric energy in batteries.

== Career ==
She is a member of RISE- Jordan's Women's Everest Expedition, that climbed Mount Everest in 2018.

Her works have been featured internationally, including at the MoMA in New York, the MAK in Vienna, and the Stedelijk Museum in Amsterdam.

== Awards and honours ==
In 2013 she was awarded the Lexus Design Award.

== See also ==
- Kamel Mahadin
- Ali Maher (artist/architect)
