= Lullabies from the Axis of Evil =

2004 compilation album by artists from various countries

Compilation album by Various
- Released: 2004
- Recorded: 2002–2003
- Genre: Lullabies
- Languages: Arabic, English, Persian, Korean, Pashto, Spanish
- Labels: Kirkelig Kulturverksted (Norway), Valley Entertainment (U.S.)
- Producer: Erik Hillestad

Lullabies from the Axis of Evil (2004) is an album collecting traditional lullabies sung by women from Iraq, Iran, and North Korea ("the axis of evil"), as well as Syria, Libya, and Cuba ("beyond the axis of evil"), plus Afghanistan and Palestine, mixed with Western performers singing translated versions of the songs.

It was conceived by Norwegian music producer Erik Hillestad in reaction to the "axis of evil" term first used by U.S. President George W. Bush in his 2002 State of the Union address.

== Reception ==
Professional ratings
Review scores
Source	Rating
Allmusic	3/5 stars

Reviewers generally acclaimed the idea of the album, while reviews of the final product were mixed.

- Washington Post: "The most thought-provoking musical statement made this election year just might be a CD of heartbreakingly beautiful songs for babies."
- Allmusic: "The idea is excellent – giving a human face to those countries labeled by George W. Bush as "the axis of evil" in his 2002 speech. [...] But it's the music that lets the project down."

== Controversy ==
- The producer claimed that several artists had not wanted to participate in the project, because they were afraid of boycott from the music industry and media.
- According to a statement from the album's U.S. distributor Valley Entertainment, their company was blacklisted in 2007 by the George W. Bush administration because of its release. A press release (2 March 2007) from the album's original Norwegian record company Kirkelig Kulturverksted (Norway's largest independent record label) also claimed that their U.S. distributor had been blacklisted by the Bush administration.

== Track listing ==
1. "Sad Sol (You, My Destiny)" (Iran) – Mahsa Vahdat, Sarah Jane Morris
2. "Dilelol (Sleep, My Child)" (Iraq) – Amel Kthyer, Halla Balsam, Eva Dahlgren
3. "Lalolalo (Don't You Worry My Child)" (Afghanistan) – Kulsoom Syed Ghulam, Lila Downs
4. "Ya Layl Ma Atwalak (This Never Ending Night)" (Palestine) – Rim Banna, Kari Bremnes
5. "Luna, Luna (Luna, Luna Little Doll)" (Syria) – Mayada Killsly Baghdadi, Mimi
6. "Peace Song" (Iraq) – Halla Balsam, Sevara Nazarkhan
7. "Aruru (Lullaby, Sweet Baby)" (Cuba) – Martha Lorenzo e Nina Hagen
8. "Stars Are Rising" (North Korea) – Sun Ju Lee, Eddi Reader
9. "Nami (Angel)" (Syria) – Viva Killisly Chachati, Katia Cardenal
10. "Lalalala Gohle Leleh" (Iran) – Mahsa Vahdat, Marjan Vahdat
11. "Garibe (Watching Over Me)" (Iraq) – Halla Balsam, Rickie Lee Jones
12. "Nami Ya La'aubi (Sleep My Doll)" (Palestine) – Rim Banna, Annisette Hansen
13. "Gohlelale (My Tulip, My Pearl)" (Iran) – Pari Zanganeh, Washington Cathedral Girls Choristers
14. "Nami (Lament)" (Palestine) – Jawaher Shofani
15. "Mazar (Some Day, My Boy)" (Afghanistan) – Fanzya Ali, Razya Khan Ali, Elana Fremerman

== See also ==
- Literature from the "Axis of Evil" (2006), a similar anthology of texts
- Holidays in the Axis of Evil, a BBC documentary.
