= Mohsen Subhi =

Mohsen Subhi محسن صبحي
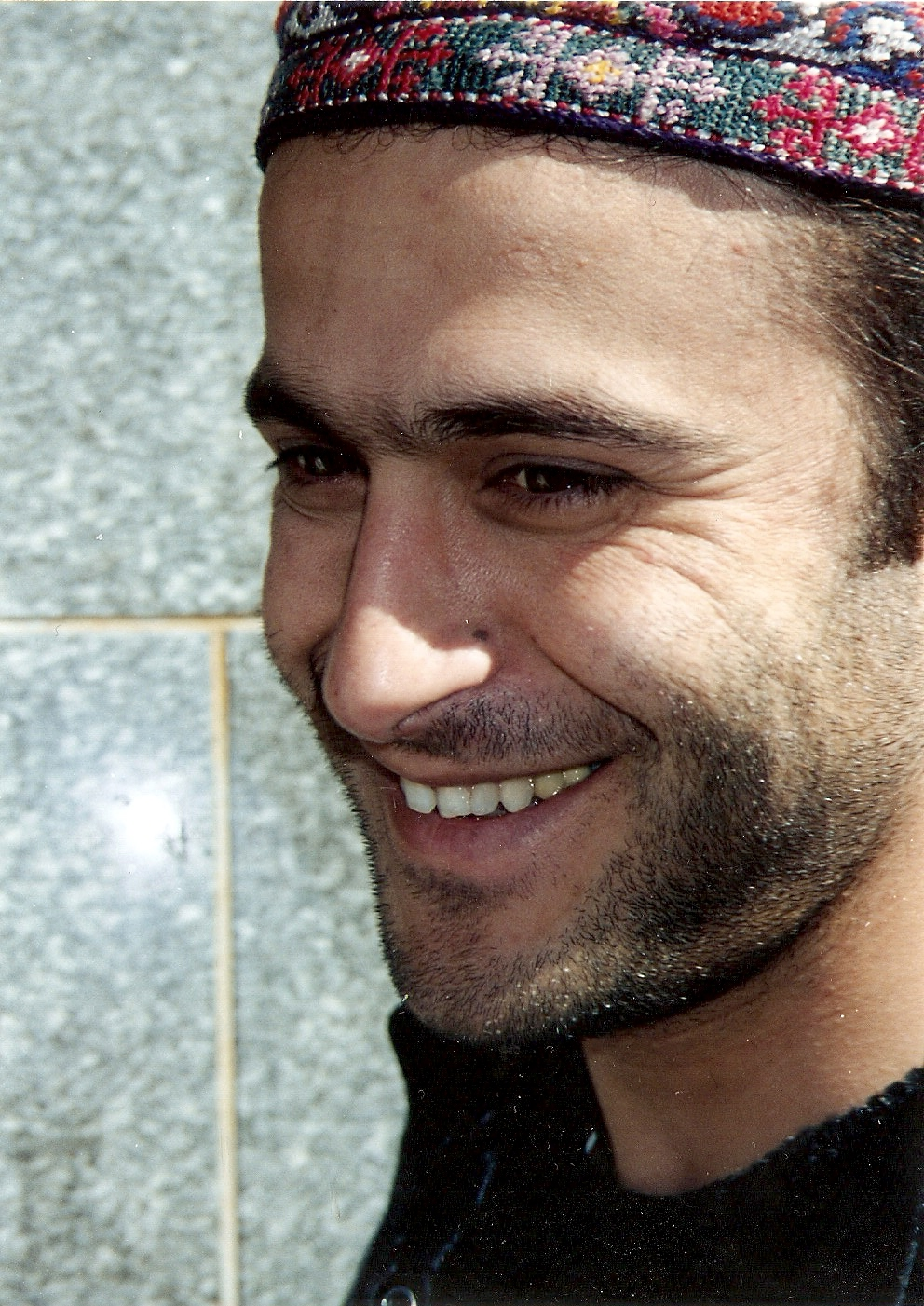
- Cambridge, MA, spring of 1999

Background information
- Born: October 4, 1963; Ramallah
- Origin: Palestinian
- Died: August 2, 2009 (aged 45) Ramallah
- Genres: Oud, Arabic Music, Oriental Jazz

Mohsen Subhi (Arabic: محسن صبحي, or Mohsen Subhi Khalil Abd al-Hamid Ataya) (October 4, 1963 – August 2, 2009) was a Palestinian composer of classical Arabic music and an arranger of modern Palestinian music and folk song.

A master oud player and percussionist, Subhi was born in Ramallah, Palestine, where he established himself as a young musician, composer, performer and teacher. He moved to Boston, Massachusetts, in 1997 and continued living and working in Palestine, the United States (Boston and San Francisco) and Jordan.

Mohsen composed, arranged, (re)interpreted and performed music for television, plays, films and live audiences. After receiving a grant to record his second classical Arabic music (instrumental) CD, Subhi (also known as Abu Kinaan) died as a result of an accident on August 2, 2009, in Ramallah. He was buried in Al-Bireh.

== Education and training ==
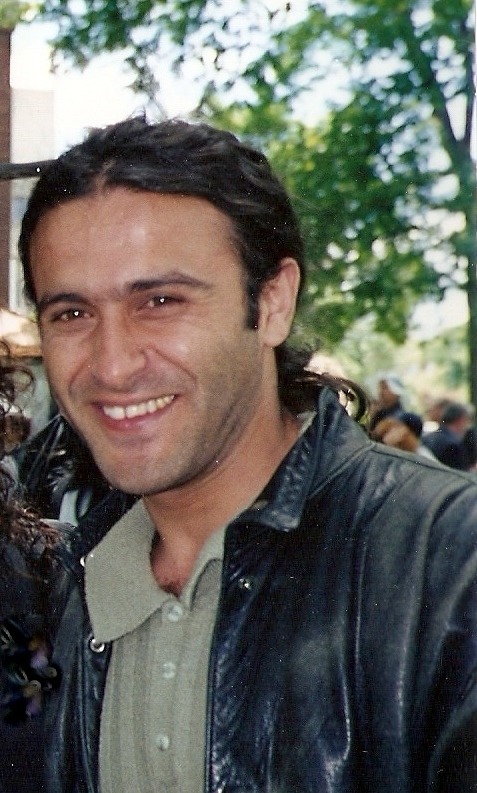
Subhi in Cambridge, MA (June 1998)

Mohsen began teaching himself music at the age of seven, initially as a percussionist and later on adopting the Oud as his main instrument. Master oud player Hatem Al-Afghani was among Mohsen's early music teachers. In the United States, Mohsen attended classes at the Berklee College of Music in Boston and the Longy School of Music (Cambridge, MA) where he continued developing his unique style.

== Early career ==
Mohsen composed, arranged, (re)interpreted and performed music for educational purposes, television, plays, dance troupes, films and live audiences.

He also taught percussion and/or Oud to children and adults through institutions, schools and private lessons in Ramallah and Jerusalem (Palestine) as well as Boston (1997–1999) and later on, San Francisco (U.S.)

Although best known as an Oud player, Mohsen also used the Buzuq, and as a percussionist played derbakeh (tabla), taar, mazhar (frame drum), and daf (tambourine) fusing Arab, Persian, Indian and African rhythms.

Raseef al-Madeena

Subhi played buzuk and percussion with the Ramallah-based group, Al-Rahhala including its 1988 "Raseef al-Madeena".

== Later musical works ==
Zaghareed

While serving as the music director of the Palestinian National Music and Dance Troupe El-Funoun (an internationally recognized dabke group) in Palestine, Mohsen composed the music to their popular production Zaghareed (Ululations) in 1997. Mohsen's reinterpretation and rearrangement of traditional Palestinian folkloric wedding songs was choreographed and danced by El-Funoun. Zaghareed could be best described as "an artistic work that combined authenticity with originality, traditional raw material with more modernistic dance components, and finally a very Palestinian theme with attributes that carry a universal appeal.".

Mawasem

In 2006, the Lebanon-based independent record label Incognito released Mohsen Subhi's instrumental, Mawasem (Seasons), the first compilation of his renowned composition of oud pieces, accompanied by bass, cello and piano (featuring Antoine Lammam – percussions). In Mawasem, explains Jihad Touma, "Subhi starts in maqam, in a circle widening with revelation, proceeding to a point where, necessarily, commentary falls short." (translated from Arabic from the backcover of Mawasem). Touma continues,

And then there is the passage... He proceeds with working the maqam, confounding it, subtly morphing its identity into hybrid, genuine forms, loading every sound with the pangs of yet unborn maqams... Breaks are not expected in the moments and the spaces they span. Breaks are expected in their reflections. The 'oud trembles, groans, lurches, longs... The 'oud listens to its echo. The echo of the 'oud infuses the horizon of the rhythm as homogenous column. And in the end, the maqam settles on the inevitability of its absence.

Commenting on Mawasem, Rabih Z wrote in the June 2006 issue of Time Out Beirut:

Mohsen Subhi has a very personal way of playing the oud, due to his previous experience as a percussionist and his subtle assimilation of Indian, African and Mediterranean influences. The album has received popular and critical acclaim in Lebanon: It is difficult not to fall helplessly in love with Mohsen Subhi's bewitching album Mawasem. Subhi's masterful oud playing is akin to a mystical art, making this CD breathtaking listening. (Rabih Z, Time Out Beirut, June 2006).

== Film scores ==
Subhi composed and performed the original soundtrack for a number of films documenting Palestinian life and history. Examples of film scores by Mohsen include:

- The Presence of Absence in the Ruins of Kafr Bir’im by John Halaka (2007)
- The Imaginary Village by Sandy Tolan and Melissa Robbins (2004). Melissa Robbins, co-producer (with Sandy Tolan) of The Imaginary Village, commented on working with Mohsen and the impact of his music on the documentary

It was also a thrill for me to work with an original score, by Palestinian-American musician Mohsen Subhi Abdelhamid—to have the extra tool and the extra challenge of music. At some point, the music began to feel like another voice in the piece, with its own message to shape and respect.

- The Inner Tour by Raanan Alexandrowicz (2001). Mohsen (spelled Muhssein Abed Al Hamid in the credits) was one of three artists whose music is used throughout the documentary. He spent the three days in the bus with the group of Palestinians whose stories the documentary attempts to tell and can be seen throughout the movie, often playing his Oud.
- Ali wa ashabuhu (Ali and his Friends) by Sobhi Al-Zobaidi (2000)

His music was used as additional tracks in other movies. Examples include:

- Salt of this Sea by Annemarie Jacir, (2008)
- This Palestinian Life by Philip Rizk (2008)

== Death ==
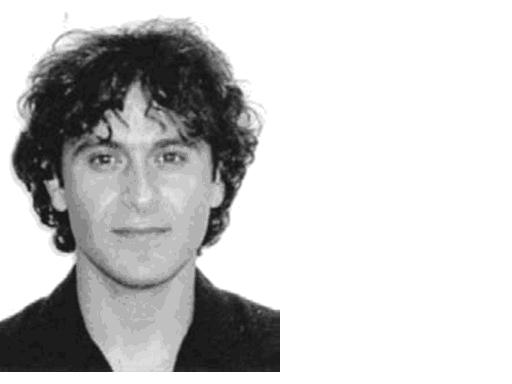
In Ramallah, Palestine (1996)

On August 2, 2009, Subhi died in Ramallah as a result of an accident. He was buried in Al-Bireh (see the daily Al-Quds August 3 through 7th, 2009 and September 10, 2009). His latest (and last) classical Arabic music (instrumental) CD will be released in the near future. The October 2009 issue of This Week in Palestine "shar[ed] words rushed by his untimely departure"

"In the act of performance, Mohsen would wrap himself around the belly of his oud – holding on to it as much as holding it – close his eyes, and let handplectrum- fingers-string-nerves-fleshwood fuse into a continuum of vibrations, which entrances as it grips the listener in its resonance." (p.57).

== See also ==
Samples of Subhi's music (from Mawasem)

For a glimpse of Mohsen, see the trailer for The Inner Tour, where he says: "Some people, they don't like their lives. That's why I ask."
