= Tania Saleh =

Lebanese singer-songwriter (born 1969)

Tania Saleh تانيا صالح
- Born: March 11, 1969 (age 57); Beirut, Lebanon
- Genres: World; Contemporary Alternative Mediterranean Arabic
- Occupation: Singer-songwriter-visual artist
- Years active: 1990–present
- Label: Tantune
- Website: Official website

Tania Saleh (Arabic: تانيا صالح; born March 11, 1969) is a Lebanese singer-songwriter and visual artist who has been active in the Arabic independent musical scene since 1990.

== Early life ==
Tania Saleh is a Lebanese singer, songwriter, and visual artist. She is also one of the founders of the Arabic independent alternative musical scene in Lebanon. She blends traditional Arabic music with a Western sound. The themes of her music include social and political turmoil in Lebanon (Saleh was six years old when the Lebanese civil war began).

Since her debut in 1990, she has experimented with various musical genres to create a blend of Lebanese music with folk, alternative rock, bossa nova, jazz, and most recently electronic music.

Alex Bessos encountered Saleh while searching for a lead vocalist for his band Minus Infinitee. Bessos expressed his interest in Saleh's voice and invited her to audition. Her first live performance was in 1986 at the West Hall of the American University of Beirut. Saleh's time with Minus Infinitee ended when Bessos emigrated to the United States.

=== Childhood ===
Her childhood and teenage years were affected by her parents' divorce, the civil war, and the fact that her mother was raising her two daughters alone. Saleh had to start working at an early age to help support the family. At 17, she sang in various choirs, wrote jingles for radio commercials, and worked as a freelance illustrator and graphic designer.

=== Education ===
Saleh enrolled in The Lebanese American University to study Fine Arts but later chose music. While in college, she joined many rock bands in search of her own style. Sometimes she had to cross the border between East and West Beirut to rehearse with other musicians.

In 1990, after the civil war ended, she left for Paris to get her master's degree in Arts Plastiques (EN: "plastic arts"). During this time, she lived in a boat on the Seine.

=== Television and advertising ===
Between 1992 and 1994, she applied her interest for the arts in the world of television. She experimented with image and sound, created illustrations, animations, video art, and wrote music jingles for Future Television. Later, she worked in advertising, and developed her ideas about audio-visual and conceptual experimentation.

=== Collaboration with Ziad Rahbany ===
Saleh auditioned for an upcoming play by Ziad Rahbany, a Lebanese composer, pianist and playwright. She acted and sang live in two consecutive plays, Bikhsous el Karameh Wil Shaab el Anid and Lawla Foushat el Amal between 1993 and 1996, and contributed backing vocals recording on two cult classic albums, Bema Enno (with the late singer Joseph Sakr) and Ila Assy (a tribute to Assy Rahbany by Fairouz). Saleh also designed the album art for both releases.

== Career ==
=== First & Second album ===
In 1997, Saleh started work on her solo album Tania Saleh, co-produced by sound engineer and music producer Philippe Tohme. She worked in collaboration with music veteran Issam Hajali from the Al Ard band. The album was recorded at Notta Studio. Two singles were released, "Al Ozone" in 1997 and "Habibi" in 2002. Although not a mainstream success, Saleh received some interest on the nascent internet community in the Arab world.

The second studio album Wehde was released on April 13, 2011. The album was the best-selling album at the Virgin Megastore in Beirut.

=== Early Collaborations ===
Saleh wrote the lyrics to Natacha Atlas' song "Communicate", released on Lebanese band Blend's album Act One. She was featured in Next Music Station, a documentary by Fermin Muguruza about the modern independent Arab music scene.

She worked with music producer Miles Copeland in the PBS-produced documentary Dissonance and Harmony/Arab Music Goes West. Copeland mentioned his collaboration with Saleh in his autobiography Two Steps Forward, One Step Back.

In 2007, Saleh wrote the lyrics to "Mreyte Ya Mreyte", the title song in Lebanese director Nadine Labaki's first feature film Caramel, composed by Khaled Mouzannar.

Saleh wrote the lyrics for and coached the singers in Khaled Mouzannar's soundtrack for Nadine Labaki's second feature film Where Do We Go Now? released worldwide in September 2011. The film soundtrack won the "Best Music Award" at the Stockholm International Film Festival in November 2011.

=== Live albums ===
Tania Saleh Live at DRM was her first live album, released in 2012. It contains songs from Khaled Mouzannar's film soundtracks, and three previously unreleased songs.

A second live EP, Tania Saleh Live in Barcelona, containing songs from various albums was released in 2020.

=== Lebanese Festivals ===
In Lebanon, she opened the Byblos International Festival in 2002 and the Beirut Spring Festival in 2013, and was chosen by The Baalbeck International Festival to perform at the Temple of Bacchus in 2014. She also shared the stage as a guest with Lebanese trumpet player and composer Ibrahim Maalouf at the Byblos International Festival the same year.

=== Independence and international festivals ===
She is still working independently, without a manager or booking agency, and has performed live at Hammamet Festival (Tunisia), Mawazine Festival (Morocco), UNESCO and Institut du Monde Arabe (France), Dubai Expo 2020 (UAE), Cairo Opera House & Al Gouna Film Festival (Egypt), The Barbican Centre (UK), The Nobel Peace Centre, Freezone Festival, Woman's Voices Festival, The Oslo World Festival (Norway), Beirut Spring Festival and Byblos Festival (Lebanon), The Roxy & Arlington Festival (USA), Kulturhuset Stadsteatern and Stallet (Sweden) and other venues.

Her musical collaborations are eclectic, including: Ziad Rahbany, Toufic Farroukh, Issam Hajali, Charbel Rouhana, Ibrahim Maalouf, Rayess Bek, Khaled Mouzannar, RZA, Nile Rodgers, Charlotte Caffey, Tarek El Nasser, Natasha Atlas, Bernd Kurtzke, Erik Hillestad, Anneli Drecker, Mathias Eick, Kjetil Bjerkestrand, Terry Evans, Hazem Shahine, Lisa Nordström, Bugge Wesseltoft, Kari Bremnes, Øyvind Kristiansen, Lina Nyberg, and Chinese Man Records. She has also collaborated in musical workshops and residencies in Lebanon, France, Italy, USA, Norway, Sweden, Germany, UAE, Switzerland, Kuwait, and Egypt.

Norwegian producer Erik Hillestad from the label Kirkelig Kulturverksted has co-produced her three albums, A Few Images (Algumas Imagens) (2014), Intersection (2017), and 10 A.D. (2021) with the support of the Norwegian Ministry of Foreign Affairs. Intersection (2017) and 10 A.D. (2021) won the German Records Critics' Award in the "world music" category.

== Personal life ==
She married music producer and sound engineer Philippe Tohme and had children in 1997 and 2003, taking a hiatus from live shows. In the meantime, she started writing her second album, "Wehde", while still working in the advertising world. Her marriage to Tohmé ended in 2011. Saleh's latest album 10 A.D. is a journey into a woman's life, ten years after a divorce.

== Discography ==
=== Studio albums ===
- Tania Saleh (2002) - Tantune
- Wehde (2011) - Tantune
- A Few Images (Algumas Imagens) (2014) - KKV
- Intersection (2017) - KKV
- 10 A.D. (10 Years After Divorce) (2021) - KKV
- Child's Play (Children audiovisual album) (2024) - Tantune
- Fragile (2025) - Tantune

=== Live albums ===
- Tania Saleh Live at DRM (2012)
- Tania Saleh Live in Barcelona (2019)

=== Singles ===
- "Al Ozone" (single) (1997)
- "Slow Down" (single) (2006)
- "Ers El Deek" (single) (2007)
- "Ya Ghosna Naqa" (collaboration with Charbel Rouhana) (1997)
- "Ya Baalback" (single) (2015)
- "Show Me the Way" Remix (single) (2020)
- "Ya Reit/I Wish" (single) (2020)
- "In Rah Minnik Ya Ein/Out Of Sight" (single) (2020)
- "From Me and You" (collaboration with Zäy & Ghassen Fendri) (2021)
- "Sakakeen" (single) - (collaboration with Chinese Man Records) (2022)
- "Matrah" (single) - (2025)
- "Qul" (single) - (2025)

=== Compilation albums ===
- Desert Roses 5 (2007) U.S.A.
- Baghdad Heavy Metal (2007) U.S.A.
- Radio Beirut (2012) Germany
- Sunset in Marrakesh (2016) Turkey
- Sunset in Mykonos (2016) Turkey
- La Fleur Orientale (2016) Turkey
- Songs from a Stolen Spring (2014) Norway
- Putumayo-Acoustic Women (2019) U.S.A.
- Chinese Man Records-Matteo & Bro (2022) France

=== Collaborations ===
- "Ila Assy" B.V. by Tania Saleh - music by Ziad Rahbany for Fairuz (1996) Lebanon
- "Bema Enno" B.V. by Tania Saleh - music by Ziad Rahbany for Joseph Sakr (1997) Lebanon
- "Salamat" B.V. by Tania Saleh - music by Charbel Rouhana (1998) Lebanon
- "Calipyge / Drab Zeen" lyrics by Tania Saleh - music by Toufic Farroukh (2002) Lebanon/France
- "Ya Ghosna Naqa / Vice Versa" old poem performed by Tania Saleh - music by Charbel Rouhana (2003) Lebanon
- "Ya Ghosna Naqa / Middle Eastern Oud" old poem performed by Tania Saleh - music by Charbel Rouhana (2004) Lebanon/U.S.A.
- "Act One - featuring Natasha Atlas" lyrics by Tania Saleh - music by Blend (2004) Lebanon
- "Caramel" lyrics by Tania Saleh - music by Khaled Mouzannar (2005) Lebanon/France
- "Dance Cycle / Lord Kanoun" performed by Tania Saleh - music by Iman Homsy (2006) Lebanon
- "Where Do We Go Now" lyrics by Tania Saleh - music by Khaled Mouzannar (2011) Lebanon/France
- "Not A Word Was Spoken" performed by Tania Saleh and Terry Evans (2014) Norway/U.S.A.
- "Rizkallah" lyrics, music, and performance by Tania Saleh and Rayess Bek (2014) Lebanon/France
- "Fi Asfour" lyrics by Tania Saleh - music by A. & G. Nehme - performed by Abeer Nehme (2019)
- "El Hadouta Nota Nota" lyrics by Tania Saleh - music by Charbel Rouhana (2022) Lebanon
- "Sakakeen" lyrics by Tania Saleh - music by Matteo & Bro/Chinese Man Records (2022) France
