= Mounir Troudi =

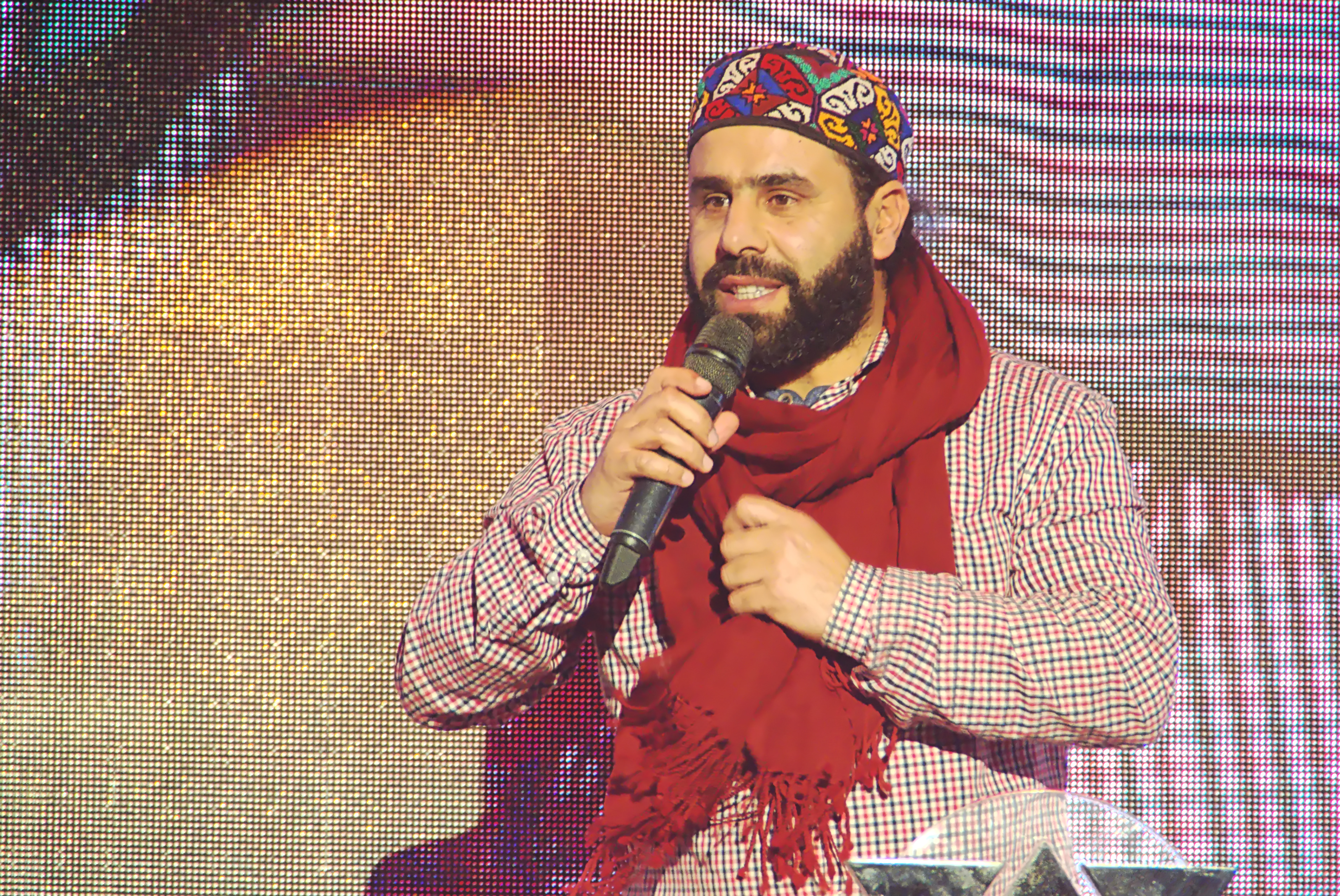
- Mounir Troudi in February 2015

Background information
- Born: 1968 (age 57–58); Tunisia
- Origin: Tunisia
- Genres: Jazz, Sufi music
- Occupation: Singer
- Instrument: Vocals
- Years active: 1994–present

Mounir Troudi (منير الطرودي) (b. 1968) is a jazz and Sufi music singer from Tunisia.

Mounir grew up in Tunis, and he received his diploma Arabic music in 1998. He made his debut with Fadhel Jaziri and his show Hadhra in 1994, and in the early 2000s he formed Nagouz. He has also appeared in several albums with jazz trumpet player Erik Truffaz.

In 2010 he released his album Tawassol.

Mounir announced Bach on the bac as his next project in June 2018.

== Performances ==
- 1994: Hadhra
- 2000: Tabarka Jazz Festival

== Albums ==
- 2002: Mantis (with Erik Truffaz)
- 2005: Saloua (with Erik Truffaz)
- 2010: Tawassol
- 2014: Songs from a Stolen Spring (compilation)
- Bach on the bac
