= Kirkelig Kulturverksted =

Norwegian record label

Kirkelig Kulturverksted (KKV) is a Norwegian company and record label, founded in 1974 by Erik Hillestad. Among the musicians who have issued records on the label are Ketil Bjørnstad, Kari Bremnes, Erik Bye, Ole Paus, Sigvart Dagsland, Bjørn Eidsvåg, Knut Reiersrud, Deeyah and SKRUK.

== Artists ==
- 018
- Arild Andersen
- Arne Domnérus
- Carola
- Dronning Mauds Land
- Elle Melle
- Erik Bye
- Farmers Market
- Henning Sommerro
- Iver Kleive
- Kari Bremnes
- Karoline Krüger
- Katia Cardenal
- Kjetil Bjerkestrand
- Knut Reiersrud
- Lars Bremnes
- Lars Lillo-Stenberg
- Lill Lindfors
- Maria Solheim
- Mahsa Vahdat
- Morten Harket
- Ole Paus
- Rim Banna
- Sigvart Dagsland
- SKRUK
- Sondre Bratland
- Susanne Lundeng
- Tom Russel
- Tore Brunborg

== See also ==
- Kulturkirken Jakob
- Lullabies from the Axis of Evil
