= Erik Hillestad =

Norwegian record producer and lyricist (born 1951)

- Born: 12 December 1951 (age 74); Oslo
- Occupation: Record producer
- Spouse: Marianne Lystrup (m. 1971)
- Relatives: Geirr Lystrup (brother-in-law)
- Awards: Spellemannprisen; Fritt Ord Honorary Award

Erik Hillestad (born 12 December 1951) is a Norwegian record producer and lyricist.

He is founder and manager of the company and record label Kirkelig Kulturverksted. He has received several awards for his works, including a 1992 Fritt Ord Honorary Award.

== Personal life ==
Hillestad was born in Oslo, a son of priest Olaf Ludvig Zwilgmeyer Hillestad and Sigrid Engeset. He married Marianne Lystrup in 1971, and is a brother-in-law of Geirr Lystrup.

== Career ==
Hillestad established in 1974 the record company Kirkelig Kulturverksted, for which he has produced a large part of the releases. Internationally he has worked with music collaborations focusing on human rights and solidarity. In Ecuador (from 1990), Palestine (from 1992), South Africa (1994), Azerbaijan (1997), Iran (from 2007), Turkey (from 2012), Lebanon and Egypt (from 2013). He has arranged concerts honoring Dalai Lama and Tibet (Dharamsala 1998) and for building bridge between the two Koreas (Seoul 2000). As a response to the rhetoric of George W Bush, he initiated and produced the CD Lullabies from the Axis of Evil with artists from Iraq, Iran, Palestine, Afghanistan, North Korea, Syria and Cuba (2004). The record was followed up by a series of productions with Rim Banna from Palestine and Mahsa and Marjan Vahdat from Iran. Hillestad has together with Mahsa Vahdat translated a selection of 100 poems of the Persian poet Hafez into Norwegian. (I vinens speil, 2010).

In 2000, his company established the venue Kulturkirken Jakob in central Oslo. It is an old neo gothic church from 1880, which had been closed as a parish church since 1985. Under the leadership of Hillestad, it has been developed into a venue for music, visual arts and theater performances.

He has also produced music for Swedish artist Carola Häggkvist.
