= Benedicte Maurseth =

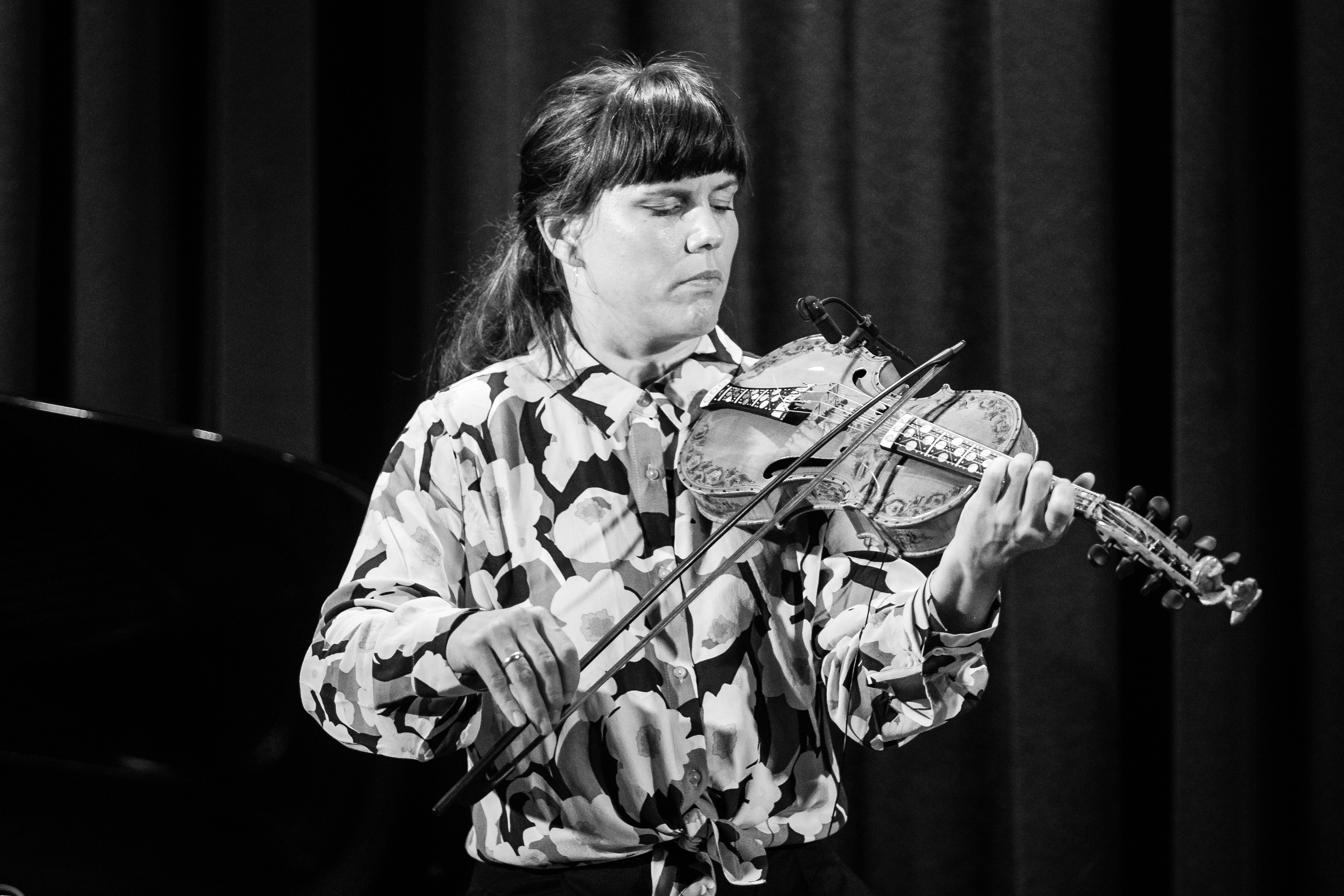

Background information
- Born: 7 February 1983 (age 43); Eidfjord Municipality, Hardanger
- Origin: Norway
- Genres: Traditional
- Occupation: Musician
- Instruments: Hardingfele; violin; vocals
- Award: Nordic Music Prize (2022)
- Website: www.maurseth.net

Benedicte Maurseth (born 7 February 1983) is a Norwegian traditional folk singer and musician.

== Career ==
Maurseth picked up the fiddle at the age seven, and studied with Knut Hamre. In addition to studies at the University of Bergen (minor in art history) she attended the Ole Bull Academy at Vossavangen in the period 2004–06. She immersed herself in the baroque instrument viola d'amore next to her main instrument Hardanger fiddle. Maurseth is also a kveder and currently works as a freelance musician based in Bergen. Since 2005 she has had extensive concert activities nationally and internationally (including in USA, Canada, India, Tyskland, Belgia and in Island), both as a solo artist and in collaborations. In Germany she played at TFF Rudolstadt in 2010 and at the 'folkBALTICA' 2011.

Together with Knut Hamre, Nils Økland and Sigbjørn Apeland, Maurseth released the album Rosa I Botnen in 2006, a production with traditional music from Hardanger, performed on fiddles from the 1600s and 1700s. This is the oldest Hardanger fiddles that are preserved, and was recorded for the first time. In 2008, Maurseth together with Berit Opheim, Åsne Valland Norli and Kristin Skaare, released the album Fodnes, which was based on folk music from Hardanger collected by Geirr Tveitt. In 2009 she composed new music for a theater version of Jon Fosse lyrics, Andvake, and she performed on stage together with actor Svein Tindberg. Her music from this underlie the first solo record Alde (2010). She has also on several occasions acted together with Jon Fosse himself. Together with Gabriel Fliflet, Stein Urheim, Kristoffer Voght and Per Jørgensen she released the album Åresong in 2011, performing lyrics by Jon Fosse. Åresong was a commissioned works at the Bergen International Festival in 2010.

Her album Hárr from 2022 earned her the Nordic Music Prize, and in 2025 she released the sequel album Mirra, containing tracks with titles associated with the reindeer, such as "Sommarbeite", "Nysnø over reinlav", and "Simleflokk under månen".

== Honours ==
- 2007: Young Folk Musician of the Year in Norway

== Bibliography ==
- 2014: Å vera ingenting – Samtalar med spelemannen Knut Hamre, Samlaget, preface by Jon Fosse

== Discography ==
=== Solo albums ===
- 2010: Alde (Heilo Records)
- 2019: Benedicte Maurseth (Heilo Records)
- 2022: Hárr (Hubro Music)
- 2025: Mirra (Hubro Music)

=== Collaborations ===
With Knut Hamre

- 2006: Rosa I Botnen (Heilo Records)
- 2012: Anima (Heilo Records)

With Åsne Valland Nordli, Berit Opheim & Kristin Skaare

- 2008: Fodne Ho Svara Stilt (Heilo Records)

Duo with Åsne Valland Nordli

- 2014: Over Tones (ECM Records)
