= Gjermund Larsen =

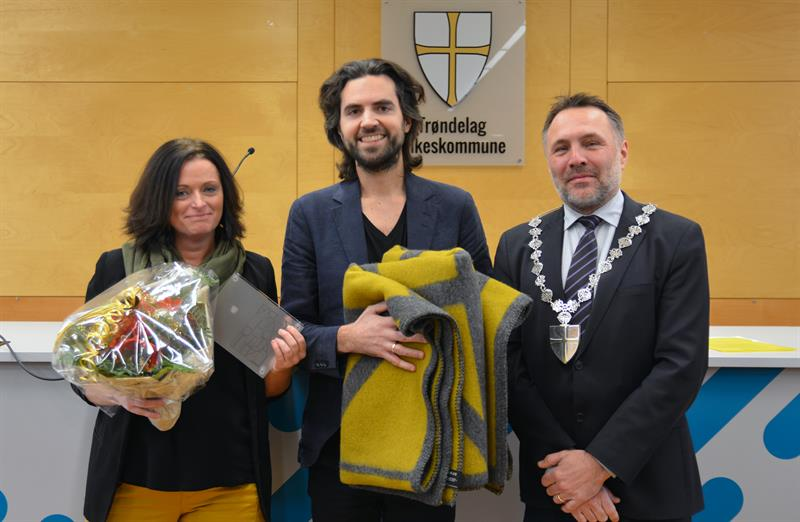
- Receiving the County Culture Award 2018

Background information
- Born: 29 July 1981 (age 44) Verdal Municipality, Nord-Trøndelag
- Origin: Norway
- Genres: Traditional music
- Occupation(s): Musician, composer
- Instrument(s): Hardingfele, violin, vocals
- Labels: Øra Fonogram, Ta:Lik, Rune Grammofon
- Website: www.gjermundlarsen.com

Gjermund Larsen (born 29 July 1981 in Verdal Municipality, Norway) is a Norwegian traditional folk musician (violin) and composer, known from several bands and recordings.

== Career ==
Larsen is a trained musician from the Ole Bull Academy at Vossavangen, and the traditional folk music program at the Norwegian Academy of Music in Oslo. During his studies he joined the band Majorstuen, and contributed on several album releases, including Majorstuen awarded Spellemannprisen 2003. He collaborated within the Finnish-Norwegian band Frigg, Christian Wallumrød Sexstet, and with Odd Nordstoga and Maj Britt Andersen, as well as with the blues artist Reidar Larsen (2006).

Larsen is the son of Norwegian the traditional folk singer Geir Egil Larsen, and was the youngest winner in the A-class aton 'Landskappleiken' (2002), where he and his brother Einar Olav Larsen was awarded a number of ensemble prizes. Sibling duo released the album Søttenpassingen (2004) with several compositions by Hilmar Alexandersen, and was awarded the Osaprisen (2004). While he received Øyvind Bergh's Memorial Prize himself. For the Vossajazz he contributed on the commission Ein engel går stilt by Berit Opheim (2007), also performed with Rikskonsertene.

Larsen debuted with the work Brytningstid for the 'Telemarkfestivalen' (2006). In 2006 he started the Gjermund Larsen Trio with Andreas Utnem (pedal organ) and Sondre Meisfjord (upright bass. They released the album Ankomst (2008), awarded the Spellemannprisen class traditional folk music/folk dancing. In 2010 they released the follow-up album Aurum.

In 2009 he released his first album with music for children, Går i fjøs, together with 'Bom Basker'. On the album presented traditional children's songs in a new guise. The album was nominated for Spellemannprisen 2009 in the class klassen music for children, at the same time as Larsen was nominated in the contemporary composer category for Grains. He was nominated for two again awards again in 2010 in the class traditional folk music/folk dance with Gjermund Larsen Trio, and the class popular composer, both for the album Aurum.

== Honors ==
- 2003: Spellemannprisen in the class traditional folk music/folk dance, within the band Majorstuen for the album Majorstuen
- 2008: Spellemannprisen in the class traditional folk music/folk dance, for the album Ankomst

== Discography ==
=== Solo albums ===
- 2004: Søttenpassingen (ta-lik), with Einar Olav Larsen
- 2008: Ankomst (Heilo)
- 2009: Går I Fjøs (Øra Fonogram), with 'Bom Basker' doing music for children
- 2010: Aurum (Heilo)
- 2013: Reise (Heilo), as Gjermund Larsen Trio
- 2014: Trønderbarokk (Øra Fonogram)
- 2016: Salmeklang (Heilo), as Gjermund Larsen Trio including Sondre Meisfjord (upright bass) and Andreas Utnem (grand piano), fetat. Nordic

=== Collaborations ===
Within 'Majorstuen'

- 2002: Majorstuen (2L)
- 2004: Jorun Jogga (Majorstuen Fiddlers Company)
- 2006: Juledrøm (Majorstuen Fiddlers Company)
- 2010: Skir (Majorstuen Fiddlers Company)
- 2011: White Night - Impressions of Norwegian Folk Music (Majorstuen Fiddlers Company)
- 2012: Live In Concert (Majorstuen Fiddlers Company)

With Maria Arredondo

- 2005: Min Jul (Universal Music)

With Christian Wallumrød Ensemble

- 2009: Fabula Suite Lugano (ECM Records)

With Christel Alsos

- 2010: Tomorrow Is (Sony Music)

With Moddi

- 2013: Kæm va du? (Propeller Recordings)
- 2013: Grønt Lauv I Snyen (Propeller Recordings)

With Arve Henriksen

- 2014: The Nature Of Connections (Rune Grammofon)

Awards
Preceded by Sigrid Moldestad	Recipient of the Traditional folk music Gammleng-prisen; 2015	Succeeded by -
Preceded by Ørjan Matre	Recipient of the Spellemannprisen composer award 2016	Succeeded by Bjørn Kruse
