= Sigbjørn Apeland =

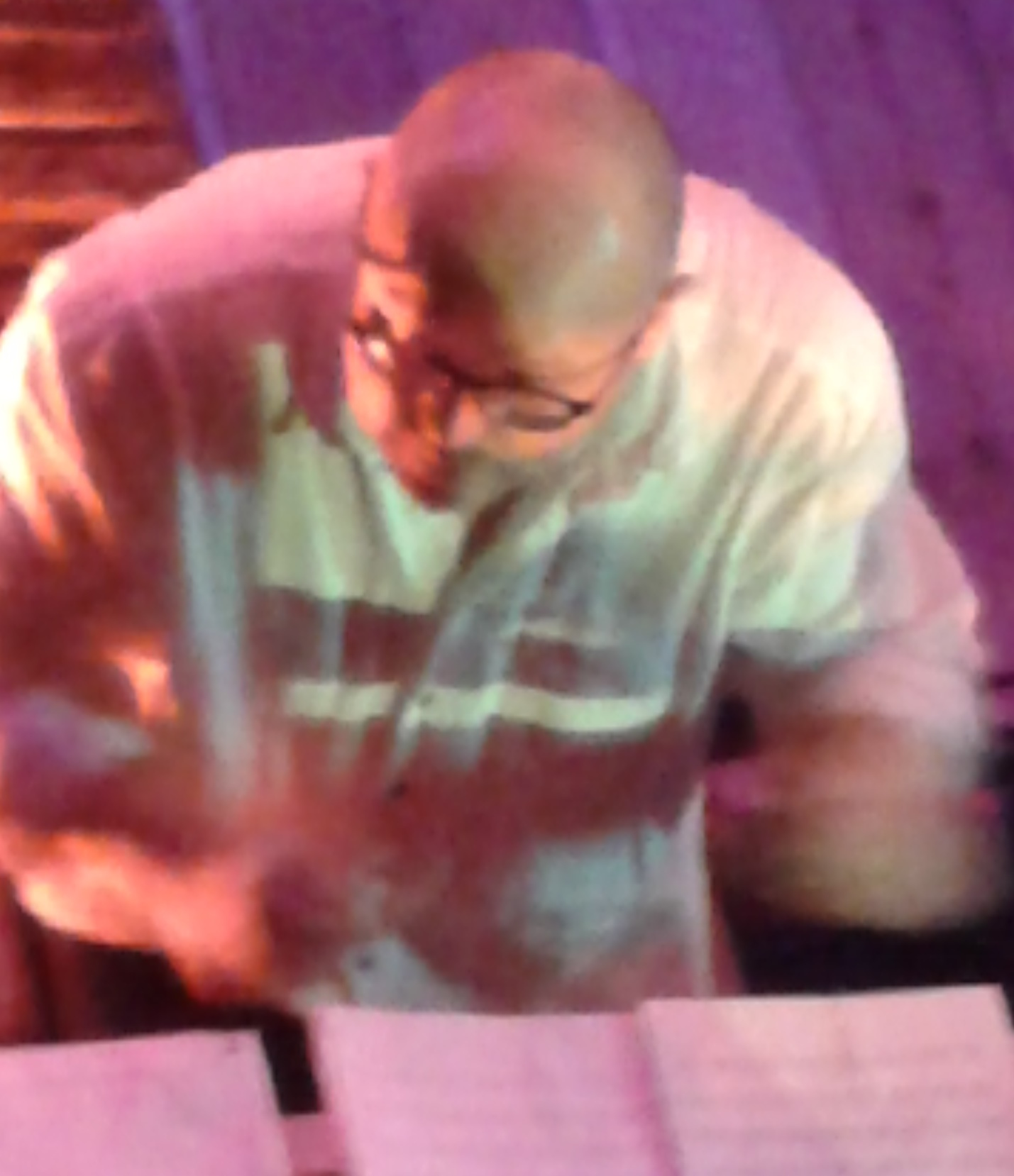
- Sigbjørn Apeland with The Real Ones at Vossajazz 2015.

Background information
- Born: 10 May 1966 (age 59); Sveio Municipality, Hordaland
- Origin: Norway
- Genres: Jazz; church music
- Occupations: Musician; composer
- Instruments: Keyboards; church organ
- Labels: Hubro Music, NorCD, ECM, Northern Spy
- Website: www.uib.no/en/persons/Sigbj%C3%B8rn.Apeland

Sigbjørn Apeland (born 10 May 1966) is a musician (organ and Harmonium) and scientist, known from several recordings and for his work in the borderland between folk music, church music and improvisational music.

== Career ==
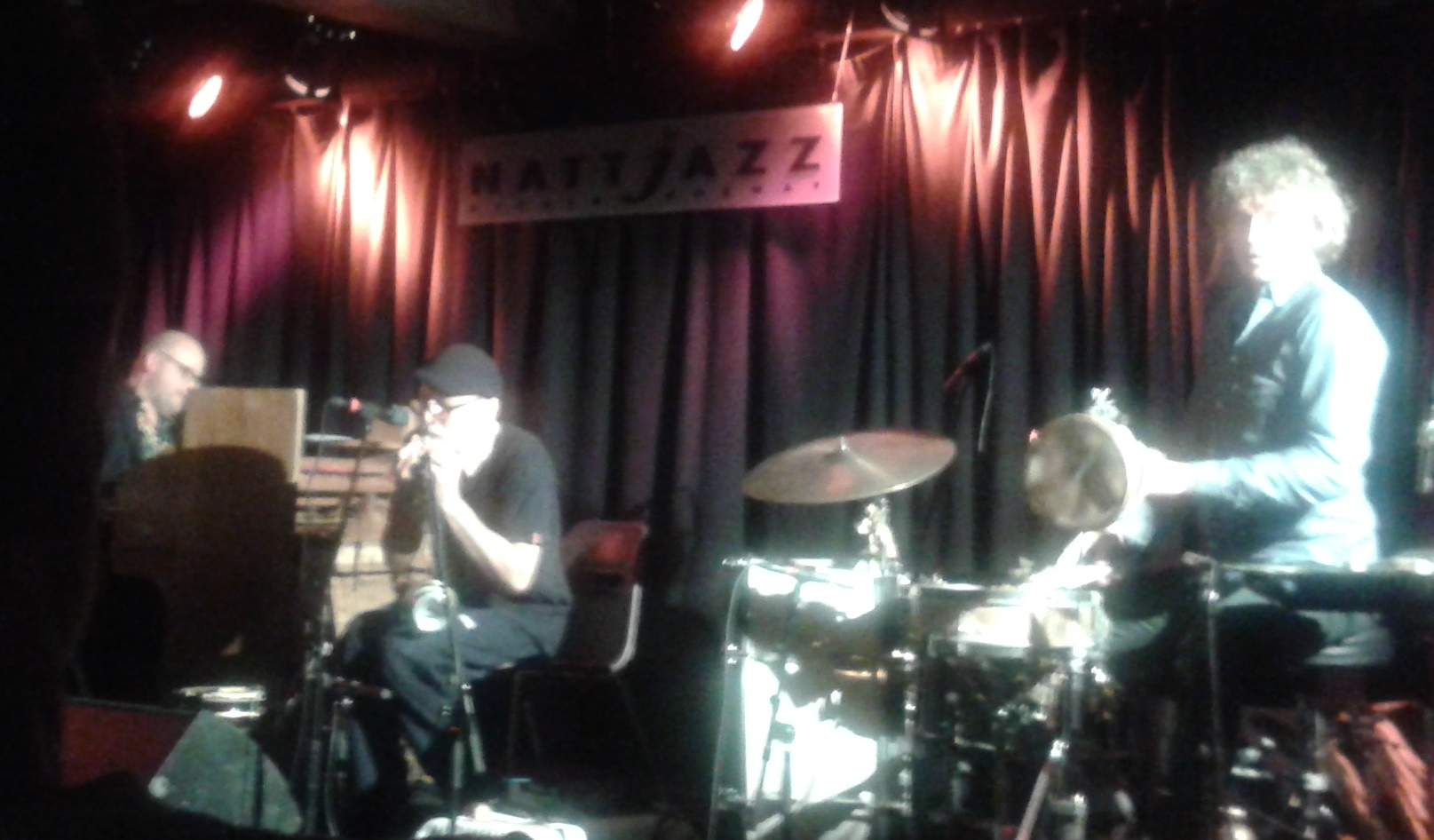
Sigbjørn Apeland

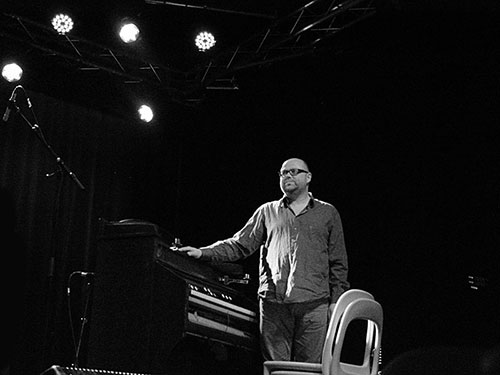
Sigbjørn Apeland in Aarhus, Denmark (2013)

Apeland was raised in Sveio Municipality, Norway. He is a graduate in performing Church music at the Rogaland Musikkonservatorium (1988) and ethnomusicology from University of Bergen (1998), before he as fellow at Griegakademiet completed his Dr. art. with the thesis Kyrkjemusikkdiskursen: Musikklivet i Den norske kyrkja som diskursiv praksis (Church music discourse: The music scene in the Norwegian church as discursive practice, 2005).

Apeland contributes on numerous album releases by Nils Økland (1995–), Reidun Horvei (1998), Ingeleiv Kvammen and Olav Kvammen (2000), Åsne Valland Nordli (2001), Marylands (2001), and Agnes Buen Garnås (2002). For the Vossajazz he released the album Fryd (1998), in collaboration with Berit Opheim (vocals), Bjørn Kjellemyr (bass), Einar Mjølsnes (Hardingfele) and Per Jørgensen (trumpet). With Berit Opheim he released the album Den Blide Sol (2007).

Apeland often plays together with county musicians in Hordaland, he also collaborates with the fiddle player Synnøve S. Bjørset, and with Knut Hamre, Hildegun Riise and Benedicte Maurseth.

== Honors ==
- 2014: Vossajazzprisen

== Discography ==
=== Solo albums ===
- 2011: Glossolalia (Hubro Music)

=== Collaborations ===
- 1998: Sette Meg I Huskestong (NorCD), with Småkvedarane frå Voss
- 1998: Fryd (Vossa Jazz Records), with Einar Mjølsnes, Per Jørgensen, Berit Opheim & Bjørn Kjellemyr
- 2007: Den Blide Sol (NorCD), with Berit Opheim
- 2009: 1982 (NorCD), with Øyvind Skarbø & Nils Økland
- 2011: Lysøen - Hommage À Ole Bull (ECM Records), with Nils Økland recorded at Lysøen
- 2016: Bumblin' Creed (Northern Spy), with Padang Food Tigers

Awards
Preceded by Tore Brunborg	Recipient of the Vossajazzprisen; 2014	Succeeded by Thea Hjelmeland
