= Harald Dahlstrøm =

Norwegian jazz musician

- Born: 2 March 1961 (age 65); Bergen, Hordaland, Norway
- Genres: Jazz
- Occupation: Musician
- Instruments: Piano, Hammond organ

Harald Dahlstrøm (born 2 March 1961 in Bergen) is a Norwegian jazz musician (piano and Hammond B3 organ), known for participation on a series of records, from collaborations with musicians like Kenneth Sivertsen and Dance with a Stranger, and as band leader for his own lineups.

== Career ==
Dahlstrøm had a Harald Dahlstrøm Project performing his own compositions at Nattjazz 1997, and has been engaged at Den Nationale Scene from 1981 to date where he has been a theatre musician for plays like "Les Miserable", "Evig Ung" and "Folk og røvere i Kardemommeby". He has been musical director for the brothers Ylvis on their show "Ylvis – En konsert", and been studio musician for among others Kenneth Sivertsen og Dance with a Stranger.

Dahlstrøm made musical arrangements for the album Strange Afternoon (1991) by the band "Secret Mission" from Bergen. He is also a member / musician and organizer of the in Bergen, hugely popular band "Voksne Herres Orkester" playing to full houses every week at Logen scene in Bergen. In recent years he has participated in the Ole Hamre notion "Fargespill".

== Honors ==
- Vossajazzprisen 1995

== Discography ==
=== Under his own name ===
- 1989: Gynt (), with Jan Kåre Hystad, Knut Skodvin, Thomsen & Tone Ljøkelsøy
- 1998: Är jag född så vill jag leva! – Syv sanger fra Bellman forestillingen i Logen, Bergen ()

=== Collaborative works ===
With Jan Kåre Hystad

- 1999: Design by Sound
- 2000: Café Hysen Noir

With other projects

- 1998: One Day in October, with Kenneth Sivertsen
- 2004: Eine Kleine Kraftmusik, with Fliflet/Hamre
- 2005: Ocean, with Tron
- 2008: Good to Go, with Erik Moll

Awards
Preceded by Gabriel Fliflet	Recipient of the Vossajazzprisen; 1995	Succeeded by Terje Isungset
