= Sondre Meisfjord =

Norwegian folk and jazz musician

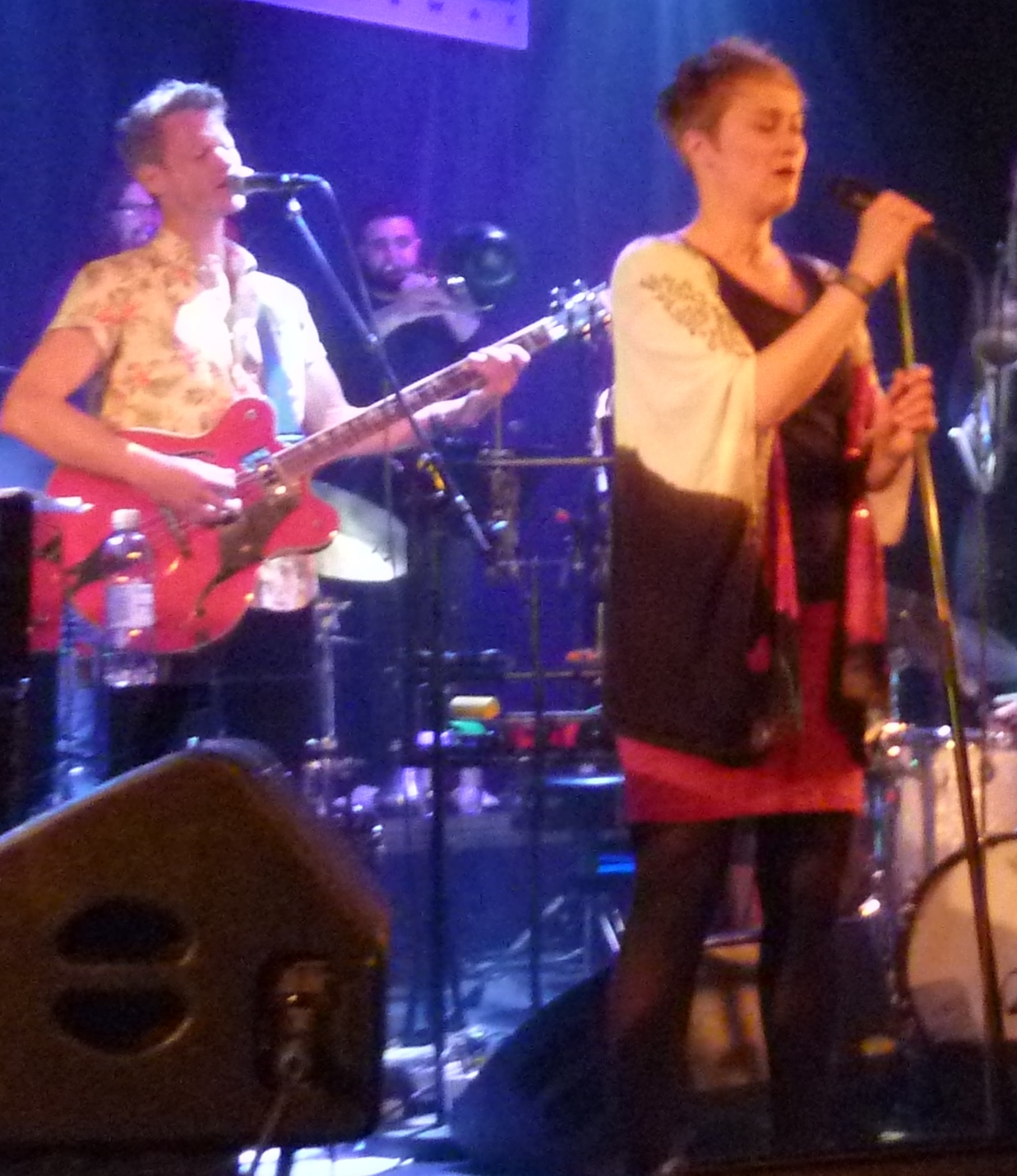
- Meisfjord with Live Maria Roggen, Come Shine and TJO in Bergen, Norway at Nattjazz 2016.

Background information
- Born: 18 March 1975 (age 51); Oslo, Norway
- Origin: Norway
- Genres: Jazz
- Occupations: Musician, composer
- Instruments: Upright bass, cello, vocals
- Website: home.online.no/~livero/meisfjord.html

Sondre Meisfjord (born 18 March 1975) is a Norwegian folk and jazz musician (double bass and cello), and composer, known for his association with bands like Come Shine, Flukt, Gjermund Larsen Trio.

== Career ==
Meisfjord was born in Oslo, and raised in Frei Municipality, Nordmøre. He attended the Jazz program at Trondheim Musikkonservatorium (1998–2001).

He won Spellemannprisen (2002) with the jazz band Come Shine (1998–2003), played Norwegian folk music with the trio 'Flukt', Irish folk music in 'Musharings', cool jazz in John Pål Inderberg's The Zetting, pop in Siri Gjære's band, and was in the Trondheim Jazz Orchestra with Pat Metheny. Other musicians he has worked with include Odd Nordstoga, Dadafon, Kringkastingsorkesteret, Trondheim Soloists, Kari Bremnes, Dipsomaniacs, Gjermund Larsen, Tord Gustavsen, and Stig Rennestraum.

Recently he has played with the 'Urban Tunélls Klezmerband'.

== Honors ==
- 2002: Spellemannprisen in the class Jazz for the album Do Do That Voodoo, within Come Shine

== Discography ==
Within Come Shine

- 2001: Come Shine (Curling Legs)
- 2002: Do Do That Voodoo (Curling Legs)
- 2003: Come Shine With The Norwegian Radio Orchestra In Concert (Curling Legs)
- 2002: Do Do That Voodoo (Curling Legs)

Within Flukt

- 2001: Spill (2L)

With Sissel Kyrkjebø

- 2005: Nordisk Vinternatt (Mercury)

With Roger Johansen

- 2007: World Of Emily (Inner Ear)

With Kari Bremnes

- 2007: Reise (Strange Ways Records)
- 2009: Ly (Kirkelig Kulturverksted)
- 2012: Og Så Kom Resten Av Livet (Kirkelig Kulturverksted)

With Odd Nordstoga

- 2008: Pilegrim (Sonet Music)

Within Gjermund Larsen Trio

- 2008: Ankomst (Heilo)
- 2010: Aurum (Heilo)
- 2013: Reise (Heilo)
- 2016: Salmeklang (Heilo)

With Gabriel Fliflet

- 2008: Rio Aga (NorCD)
