= Berit Opheim =

Norwegian singer (born 1967)

Berit Opheim Versto
- Born: Berit Opheim; 18 June 1967 (age 59); Voss Municipality, Hordaland
- Origin: Norway
- Genres: Traditional; jazz; classical
- Occupation: Musician
- Instruments: Vocals
- Website: www.olebull.no/berit-opheim

Berit Opheim Versto (born 18 June 1967 in Voss Municipality, Norway) is a Norwegian singer, known for her interpretations of folk music.

== Career ==
Opheim studied at Bergen Musikkonservatorium (1987–90) and Norges Musikkhøgskole (1990–92), and has worked since 1992 for the Ole Bull Academy in Vossavangen, as well as engagements at NTNU and Norges Musikkhøgskole.

Opheim was the front figure in Orleysa (multiple releases), a soloist in Bergen Domkantori (release in 1990). A recording of kveding (a traditional Norwegian singing style) from Urnes stavkirke resulted in her debut Eitt steg (NorCD, 1996) which won her a Spellemannprisen nomination. A long-held interest in history resulted in the book Solè mi sela (Ole Bull Academy, 1996), a collection of texts from Voss Municipality. She has led the Småkvedarane from Voss to a release (NorCD, 1998) and has also been active in the Voss Spellemannslag. She has also worked on many releases by Utla.

Recently, she has been a soloist with the BIT20 Ensemble on a number of records, won the Landskappleiken, played the role of Månefruva (The Queen of the Night) in a folk music version of The Magic Flute, with the Rikskonsertene (2004) and won the Gammleng-prisen in the folk music category in 2003. In 2005 she performed with «Sullekoppane» (Ole Hamre and Yngve Ådland). In the «BNB» trio, she has since 1998 played with the violinist Nils Økland and bassist Bjørn Kjellemyr. They released Ein Song For Dei Utsungne Stunder (2005) with their own compositions.

Opheim was a soloist in the song for Dei nynorske festspela 2006, Ny rørsle by Karl Seglem. Her other release is Den blide sol (NorCD, 2007) with organist Sigbjørn Apeland recorded at Voss kirke.

== Honors ==
- 1992: Landkappleiken winner
- 1994: Sagaprisen
- 1995: Landkappleiken winner
- 1996: Landkappleiken winner
- 2000: Forbrukersamvirkets kulturpris
- 2003: Badnajazz-prisen
- 2004: Landkappleiken winner
- 2004: Gammleng Award
- 2005: Statens Kunstnerstipend (2005–06)
- 2005: Vossajazz-prisen
- 2006: Soloist in Ny rørsle for Dei nynorske festspela, by Karl Seglem
- 2007: Commissioned work for Vossajazz Ein engel går stilt

== Discography ==
=== Solo albums ===
- 1996: Eitt Steg (NorCD), nominated for the Spellemannprisen 1997
- 2000: Syng, with Småkvedarane frå Voss
- 2007: Den Blide Sol (NorCD), with Sigbjørn Apeland
- 2007: Solo-CD med slåttetralling
- 2007: Per Indrehus/O.H. Hauge, with Dag Arnesen, Bjørn Kjellemyr and Kåre Opheim
- 2008: Slåttar På Tunga (2L Records), with Dag Arnesen

=== Collaborations ===
- 1990: Norske Arvestykker, within Bergen Domkantori as soloist
- 1991: Orleysa, within Orleysa
- 1993: Svanshornet, within Orleysa
- 1994: Rit (NorCD), with Karl Seglem's Sogn-A-Song
- 1995: Dåm, with Oslo Kammerkor
- 1995: Brodd, within Utla
- 1995: Definitely Pling Plong
- 1996: Blå Harding, with Nils Økland
- 1998: Dedicaces, with Gilles Obermayer
- 1998: Spir (NorCD), with Karl Seglem's Sogn-A-Song
- 1998: Folketonar frå Hordaland, Reidun Horvei
- 1998: Fryd (Vossa Jazz Records), with Einar Mjølsnes, Per Jørgensen, Sigbjørn Apeland and Bjørn Kjellemyr
- 1999: Bergtatt within Oslo Kammerkor, nominated for the Spellemannprisen 2000
- 2000: Straum, with Nils Økland
- 2002: Nye Nord, with Karl Seglem
- 2003: Skal/Skal Ikkje, with Kvarts
- 2005: Ein Song For Dei Utsungne Stunder (2L Records), within BNB Trio
- 2005: Løp, Lokk Og Linjar, with Lasse Thoresen & BIT 20
- 2008: Fodne Ho Svara Stilt (Heilo catalog|Heilo Records), with Benedicte Maurseth, Åsne Valland Nordli & Kristin Skaare
- 2009: Draumkvedet, with Karl Seglem

== Bibliography ==
- 1995/1996: Solæ mi sela, Collected and transcribed folk songs from Vossabygdene in the book with corresponding tape that the Ole Bull Academy released in 1996. Pictures and history of sources in addition to the music specifications.

Awards
Preceded by Magne Thormodsæter	Recipient of the Vossajazzprisen; 2005	Succeeded by Yngve Moe
