= Rusk (band) =

Norwegian folk music trio

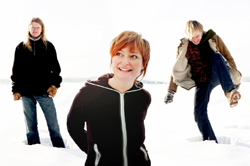

RUSK was a Norwegian folk music trio from 1999 until 2007. Members were Unni Løvlid (vocals), Frode Haltli (accordion) and Vegar Vårdal (violin and Hardanger fiddle) They started playing traditional music from the areas of Solør and Finnskogen, in their own arrangements, but also included original music from other areas of Norway and Sweden.

== History ==
Their first appearance was at a local CD compilation, 'Der skogen står fredfull'.

From 2000 until 2007 they did several tours in Norway and played Haukeliseterfestivalen, the Elverum Festival, Skei-treffen and the Farsund Folk Festival. They also did three big school concert tours for Rikskonsertene in Norway: The entire Hedmark county in 2000, in sami areas in Finnmark, Northern Norway and in Spitsbergen in 2005. They also played a few concerts in Sweden, Germany and at the Viljandi Folk Music Festival in Estonia in 2003.

Their first self-intitled album was produced by Mikael Marin from the Swedish band Väsen. Both albums got several positive reviews in Norwegian and foreign press, and their two albums have been played by the Norwegian Broadcasting and BBC Radio.
