= Sigrid Moldestad =

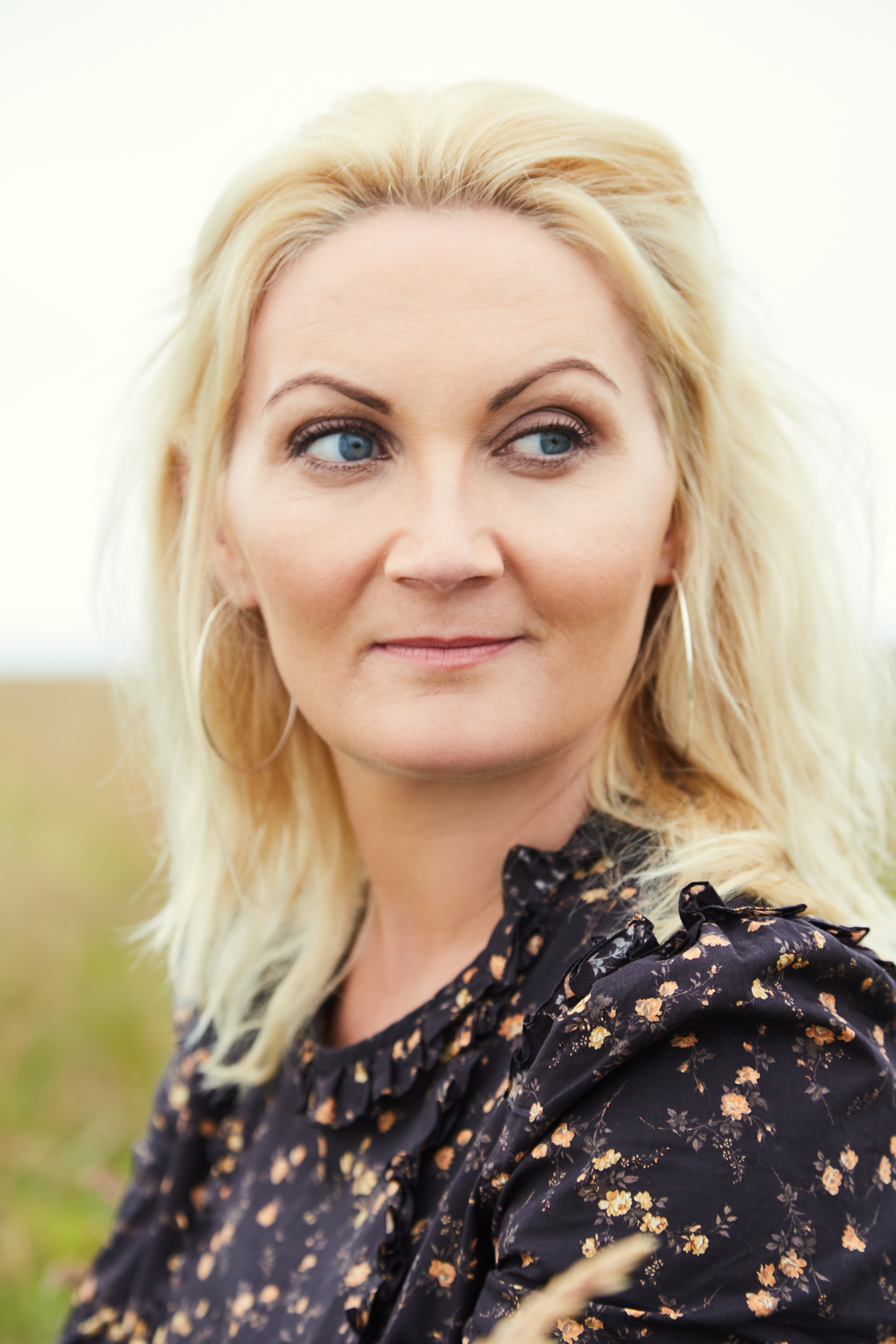

Background information
- Born: Sigrid Terese Moldestad; 19 July 1972 (age 54); Breim, Gloppen Municipality
- Origin: Sogn og Fjordane, Norway
- Genres: Folk, traditional music
- Occupations: Singer, songwriter, musician
- Instruments: Vocals, fiddle
- Years active: 1998–present
- Label: Heilo
- Website: www.hihat.no#!sigrid-moldestad/c7ql

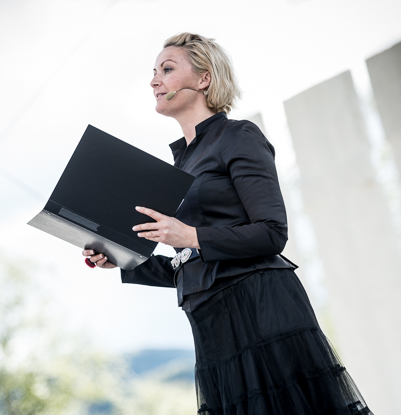
Sigrid Moldestad at Grunnlovsjubileet 2014

Sigrid Terese Moldestad (born 19 July 1972, in Breim, Gloppen Municipality, Norway) is a Norwegian folk singer, musician, and instrumentalist who plays the fiddle as well as Hardanger fiddle. She performs solo or with Sigrid Moldestad and Band. She was also part of the duo Spindel and the trio Gamalnymalt.

== Career ==
She is a graduate of Firda High School and Ole Bull-akademiet. She worked at the Norwegian Broadcasting Corporation (NRK) in the late 1990s in its regional Sogn og Fjordane offices and for NRK P3 from 1993–1999. She became a full-time freelance musician in 2000, and received a government scholarship grant in 2001–2002.

Together with Unni Løvlid and Liv Merete Kroken, she started the stage and cabaret trio Fjøgl. They set up three performances in 2001–2004, among them they were of one of the draws at The international folklore festival in Forde 2001.

She became part of the duo Spindel alongside Liv Merete Kroken and accompanying band made up of Ivar Kolve, Olav Tveitane and Dagfinn Andersen. Both Moldestad and Kroken accompanied Christine Guldbrandsen as back up fiddler musicians in 2006 Norwegian entry to the Eurovision Song Contest with the folk song "Alvedansen". Norway came 14th overall. Spindel have released two albums, the self-titled Spindel in 2001 and Aminje in 2005.

Moldestad was also part of Gamaltnymalt alongside Håkon Høgemo and Einar Mjølsnes. The three won the "Spellemannprisen 2005" (equivalent of the Norwegian Grammies) for their self-titled album Gamaltnymalt, and was soloist in performances with the Breimskoret (the Breim choir) and has taken the role of Édith Piaf on stage.

She released her debut solo album Taus in 2008. It was produced by Morgen Skage and by Sigrid Moldestad herself and included musicians Jørgen Sandvik, Anders Hall, Sigbjørn Apeland and Anders Bitustøy. Taus, meaning silence is about was about restoring the memory of forgotten, marginalised female fiddlers. She followed that up with Sandkorn mostly of her own compositions plus a cover of covers, arranged with elements of folk and rock music.

== Honors ==
- In 2005, she was co-winner with Håkon Høgemo and Einar Mjølsnes of Spellemannprisen (the Norwegian Grammy Award) in the Folk category for their debut album Gamaltnymalt.
- In 2007, she won Spellemannprisen again in the Folk category for the song "Taus" (has a double meaning, since the word could mean both an unmarried woman and silence).
- In 2008, Gloppen Municipality gave her its cultural prize.
- In 2010, she was awarded Folkelarmprisen, the Norwegian Folk Music Award, for "best folk singer of the year".
- The same year, she won the Fylkeskulturprisen award.
- In 2012, the Vossajazzprisen
- In 2014, the Gammleng-prisen in the category Traditional folk music.

== Discography ==
=== Albums ===
as Spindel

- 2001: Spindel (Heilo)
- 2005: Aminje (Heilo)

as Gamalnymalt

- 2005: Gamalnymalt

Solo

Year	Title	Peak position	Certification
Year	Title	NOR	Certification
2008	Taus	–	
2010	Sandkorn	–	
2012	Himlen har sove bort mørkret	26	
2015	Så Ta Mitt hjerte - Dei Beste Sangene (Then Take My Heart - The Best Songs)	-	

== Also appears on ==
- Beginner's Guide to Scandinavia (3CD, Nascente 2011)

Preceded by Mari Kvien Brunvoll	Recipient of the Vossajazzprisen; 2012	Succeeded by Tore Brunborg
Preceded by Odd Nordstoga	Recipient of the Traditional folk music Gammleng-prisen; 2014	Succeeded by Gjermund Larsen
