= The Nature of Connections =

Studio album by Arve Henriksen
- Released: August 22, 2014
- Length: 42:43
- Label: Rune Grammofon
- Producer: Arve Henriksen

Arve Henriksen chronology
Places Of Worship (2013)	The Nature of Connections (2014)	Chron (2014)

The Nature of Connections (released 22 August 2014 in Oslo, Norway on the label Rune Grammofon – RCD2161) is an album by Arve Henriksen.

Professional ratings
Review scores
Source	Rating
All About Jazz	5/5 stars
Allmusic	4/5 stars
NormanRecords.com	4.5/5 stars

== Background ==
On this album, Henriksen is working in harness with some of the most distinguished and dynamic musicians of Norway. They come from different traditions like folk, improvisation and jazz. They bring their specialist competition, where the results are assembled and polished to sparkle. The Nature of Connections almost entirely features pieces composed by the personnel comprising the band on the album, recorded at the legendary Rainbow Studio in Oslo by Jan Erik Kongshaug. The album has closer connections to Nordic folk and contemporary, minimalist chamber music than any of his previous releases.

== Track listing ==
No.	Title	Length
1.	"Blå Veg" (Composed by Arve Henriksen)	3:57
2.	"Hambopolskavalsen" (Composed by Gjermund Larsen)	5:22
3.	"Budbringeren" (Composed by Nils Økland)	6:16
4.	"Seclusive Song" (Composed by Svante Henryson)	3:52
5.	"Hymn" (Composed by Ståle Storløkken)	7:40
6.	"Aceh" (Composed by Mats Eilertsen)	4:39
7.	"Keen" (Composed by Svante Henryson)	5:13
8.	"Arco Akropolis" (Composed by Arve Henriksen, Audun Kleive, Gjermund Larsen, Mats Eilertsen, Nils Økland, Svante Henryson)	3:41
9.	"Salm" (Composed by Mats Eilertsen)	2:06

== Personnel ==
- Arve Henriksen - trumpet, piccolo trumpet, piano
- Gjermund Larsen – violin, Hardanger fiddle
- Nils Økland – violin, Hardanger fiddle, viola d'Amore
- Svante Henryson – cello
- Mats Eilertsen – double bass
- Audun Kleive – drums

== Credits ==
- Design by Kim Hiorthøy
- Mixed by Arve Henriksen and Jan Erik Kongshaug
- Produced by Arve Henriksen
- Recorded by Jan Erik Kongshaug

== Notes ==
- "Blå Veg" arranged by all
- "Arco Akropolis" composed by all
- Recorded and mixed at Rainbow Studio, Oslo
