= Places of Worship (album) =

Studio album by Arve Henriksen
- Released: October 1, 2013
- Length: 40:05
- Label: Rune Grammofon
- Producer: Erik Honoré

Arve Henriksen chronology
Cartography (2008)	Places of Worship (2013)	The Nature of Connections (2014)

Places of Worship (released 1 October 2013 in Oslo, Norway) is an album by Arve Henriksen.

Professional ratings
Aggregate scores
Source	Rating
Metacritic	91/100
Review scores
Source	Rating
Allmusic	4/5 stars
Exclaim!	7/10
The Guardian	5/5 stars
The Independent on Sunday	5/5 stars
Popmatters	8/10

== Background ==
This album marks the return of Henriksen to the label Rune Grammofon and furthers his collaboration with Jan Bang and Erik Honoré. He never separates himself from the environmental information provided by his natural Nordic landscape. The lush, wild, and open physical vistas of its geography provide an inner map for the trumpeter and vocalist that amounts to a deeply focused series of tone poems. While these tracks are impossible to separate from the influences of Jon Hassell's Fourth World Music explorations or the more murky moodscapes of Nils Petter Molvær, they are also more than a few steps removed from them. The experimentations within soundscapes, spaces, and texture bring the listener into sacred places the world over, hence its title.

== Track listing ==
  - (All original songs composed by Arve Henriksen, where not otherwise noted)

No.	Title	Writer(s)	Length
1.	"Adhān"		3:21
2.	"Saraswati"		4:29
3.	"Le Cimetière Marin"		4:28
4.	"The Sacristan"		3:12
5.	"Lament"		3:54
6.	"Portal"		4:11
7.	"Alhambra"		5:04
8.	"Bayon"	Peter Tornquist	3:42
9.	"Abandoned Cathedral"		4:16
10.	"Shelter From The Storm"		3:34

== Personnel ==
- Arve Henriksen - trumpet, voice, field recordings
- Erik Honoré – vocals, synth bass, sampler, drum programming
- Jan Bang – sampler, programming
- Eivind Aarset – guitar samples
- Christian Wallumrød – piano samples
- Jon Balke – piano samples
- Lars Danielsson – double bass
- Ingar Zach – percussion
- Rolf Wallin – samples, crystal chord
- Peter Tornquist – sampler, excerpts from Alba
- Ensemble Stahlquartett – Alexander Fülle, Jan Heinke, Michael Antoni, Peter Andrea
- The Norwegian Wind Ensemble – samples

== Credits ==
- Cover – Kim Hiorthøy
- Mastered By – Helge Sten
- Producer – Erik Honoré, Jan Bang
- Recorded By [Additional Recording By] – Arve Henriksen, Eivind Aarset, Ingar Zach
- Recorded By [Basic Tracks] – Thomas Hukkelberg (track: #7)
- Recorded By, Mixed By – Erik Honoré, Jan Bang

== Notes ==
- Recorded and mixed at Punkt Studio, Kristiansand
- Alhambra basic tracks recorded live at Jakobskirken, Oslo
- Mastered at Audio Virus Lab
