= Gabriel Fliflet =

Norwegian accordion player and vocalist

- Born: 18 July 1958 (age 67); Åland, Finland
- Origin: Norway
- Genres: Traditional music, jazz
- Occupations: Musician, entertainer, composer, band leader
- Instrument: Accordionist
- Website: www.gabrielfliflet.no

Gabriel Fliflet (born 18 July 1958 in Åland, Finland) is a Norwegian accordion player and vocalist, known for his multicultural musical expressions and numerous recordings. He is the brother of bass player and sagspiller Andreas Fliflet, and the son of Albert Lange Fliflet (b. 1908), who have done the achievement of translating the Finnish national epic Kalevala a New Norwegian which is close to the language of Western Telemark.

== Biography ==
Fliflet grew up in Skåne and moved to Bergen six years old. During the time of high school at Bergen Katedralskole, he and three fellow students established the band Rimfakse (1975), later he joined "Fri Flyt", and collaborated with Shetland musicians like Willie Hunter and Peerie Willie Johnson. He has worked with Berit Opheim, Sondre Bratland and Nils Økland. Later he established Novgorod (Nygård's Quartet) playing popular music from the region around Baltic Sea.

By the name Fliflet/Hamre he and percussionist Ole Hamre has since 1991 toured in Norway and internationally. The quartet "SALT" (2006–) he plays Shetland and Western Norwegian folk music with Maurice Henderson, Annlaug Børsheim and Olav Christer Rossebø. Fliflet composed the commissioned work "Elvemot" for Osafestivalen at Voss 2006. Moreover, he has driven folk-bar in Bergen (1988–) and since 1999 musical host on "Folkemusikklubben Columbi Egg" in Bergen.

== Honors ==
- 1994: Vossajazz Award
- 2000: "Statens arbeidsstipend"
- 2011: "Folkelarmprisen", This year's Folk Musician
- 2019: "Bananasmjörhonor", for good Vossajazz

== Discography (in selection) ==
=== Solo albums ===
- 2008: Rio Aga (NorCD)
- 2011: Åresong (NorCD)
- 2013: Valseria (Etnisk Musikklubb)

=== Collaborations ===
Fliflet/Hamre Energiforsyning

- 1994: Ivar Aasen Goes Bulgaria (Lahrmsteiner Elite)

Awards
Preceded by Ole Hamre	Recipient of the Vossajazzprisen; 1994	Succeeded by Harald Dahlstrøm
