= Chron (album) =

Studio album by Arve Henriksen
- Released: January 10, 2014
- Length: 42:11
- Label: Rune Grammofon
- Producer: Arve Henriksen

Arve Henriksen chronology
The Nature Of Connections (2014)	Chron (2014)	Cosmic Creation (2014)

Chron (released 10 January 2014 in Oslo, Norway on the label Rune Grammofon – AD36267-01) is an album by Arve Henriksen.

Professional ratings
Review scores
Source	Rating
All About Jazz	4.5/5 stars
Allmusic	4/5 stars
NormanRecords.com	4/5 stars

== Background ==
Chron was originally a part of the six piece vinyl release Solidification (2012). In 2014 Chron was also released as a CD release together with the album Cosmic Creation on Rune Grammofon. On Chron, Henriksen is exploring sounds and musical landscapes where his distinctive, whispering trumpet song is accompanied by strongly processed field recordings as well as an array of electronic instruments, to invite the listener towards inner pictorial creation.

== Track listing ==
No.	Title	Length
1.	"Proto-Earth"	4:19
2.	"Hadean"	1:52
3.	"Chron"	6:05
4.	"Solidification"	5:47
5.	"Zircon"	2:07
6.	"Plume Of Ash"	2:18
7.	"Magma Oscillator"	6:15
8.	"Archean"	4:24
9.	"First Life"	2:02
10.	"Plate Tectonic"	2:31
11.	"Chronozone"	2:33

All compositions by Arve Henriksen

== Personnel ==
- Arve Henriksen - trumpet, voice, electronics

== Credits ==
- Design by Kim Hiorthøy
- Mastered by Helge Sten
- Recorded by Arve Henriksen
- Produced by Arve Henriksen

== Notes ==
- Recorded and mixed at Arve Henriksen's home and in various locations such as hotels, airports, planes, railway stations and backstage in Norway, Sweden, Germany and Italy
- Mixed and mastered at Audio Virus Lab
