= Breim Municipality =

Former municipality in Sogn og Fjordane, Norway

Breim Municipality Breim herad
- Former municipality
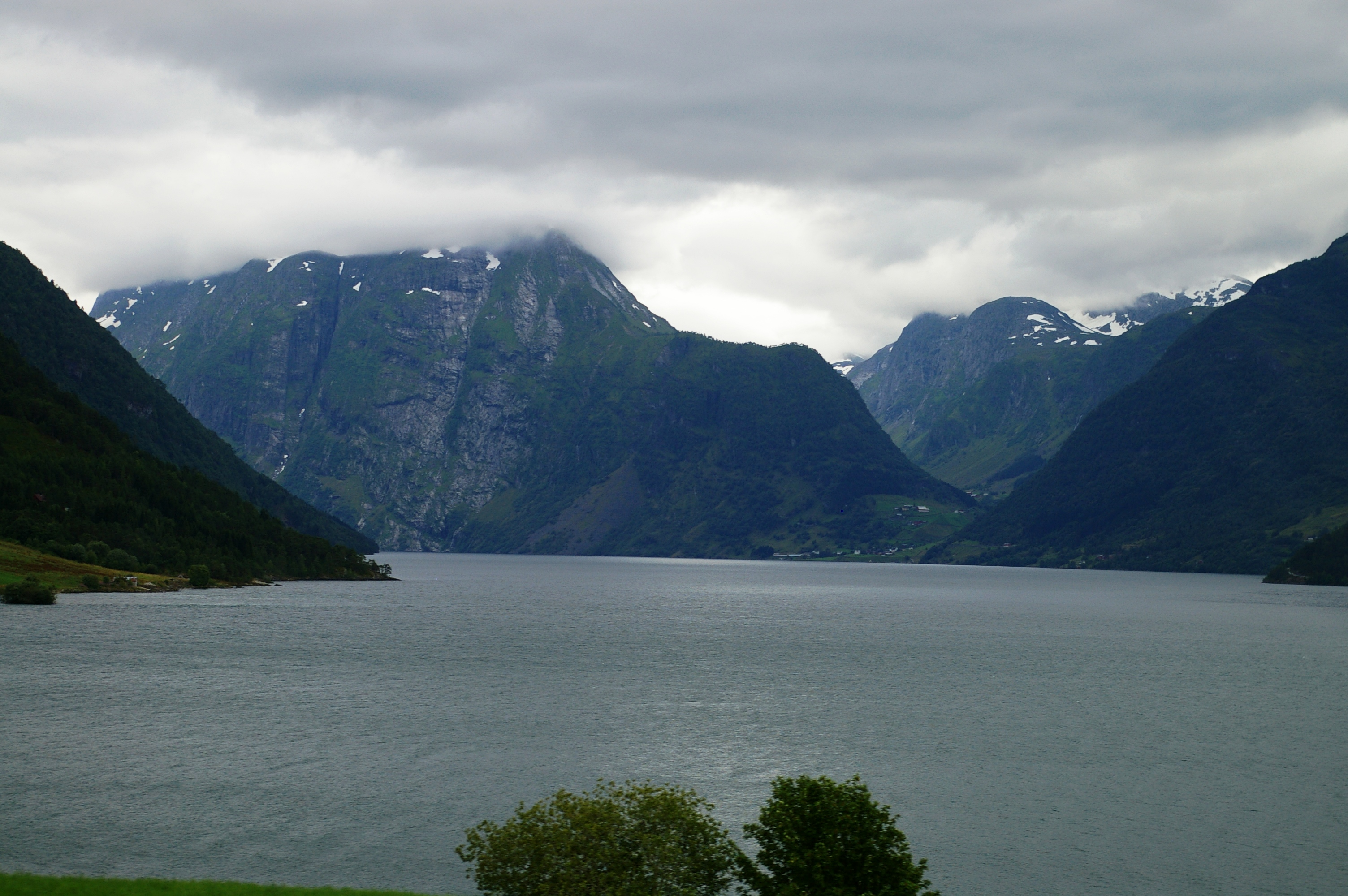
- View of the lake Breimsvatnet

- Sogn og Fjordane within Norway

- Breim within Sogn og Fjordane
- Coordinates: 61°44′01″N 06°24′28″E
- Country: Norway
- County: Sogn og Fjordane
- District: Nordfjord
- Established: 1 Jan 1886
  - Preceded by: Gloppen Municipality
- Disestablished: 1 Jan 1964
  - Succeeded by: Gloppen Municipality
- Administrative centre: Re

Government
  - Mayor (1960–1964): Olav B. Bø

Area (upon dissolution)
  - Total: 358.3 km^{2} (138.3 sq mi)
  - Rank: #248 in Norway
- Highest elevation: 1,826.59 m (5,992.7 ft)

Population (1963)
  - Total: 1,770
  - Rank: #482 in Norway
  - Density: 4.9/km^{2} (13/sq mi)
  - Change (10 years): ▼ −0.2%
- Demonym(s): Breiming; Breimning

Official language
  - Norwegian form: Nynorsk
- Time zone: UTC+01:00 (CET)
  - Summer (DST): UTC+02:00 (CEST)
- ISO 3166 code: NO-1446

Breim is a former municipality in the old Sogn og Fjordane county, Norway. The 358.3-square-kilometre (138.3 sq mi) municipality existed from 1886 until its dissolution in 1964. The area is now part of Gloppen Municipality in the traditional district of Nordfjord in Vestland county. The administrative centre was the village of Reed (also called Re).

Prior to its dissolution in 1964, the 358.3-square-kilometre (138.3 sq mi) municipality was the 248th largest by area out of the 689 municipalities in Norway. Breim Municipality was the 482nd most populous municipality in Norway with a population of about 1,770. The municipality's population density was 4.9 inhabitants per square kilometre (13/sq mi) and its population had decreased by 0.2% over the previous 10-year period.

Breim Municipality was divided into two school districts: Byrkjelo, with the Byrkjelo school and Reed with the Reed school. Both schools were primary schools. After 8th grade students had to travel to the Gloppen ungdomskule (secondary school) in Sandane.

== General information ==
On 1 January 1886, Gloppen Municipality was split into two municipalities: Gloppen Municipality (population: 2,970) in the west and Breim Municipality (population: 1,823) in the east. During the 1960s, there were many municipal mergers across Norway due to the work of the Schei Committee. On 1 January 1964, the small Førde farm (population: 38) at the southern end of the lake Breimsvatnet was administratively transferred to Jølster Municipality to the south. On the same date, the rest of Breim Municipality (population: 1,731) was merged (back) into Gloppen Municipality.

=== Name ===
The municipality (originally the parish) is named after the old name for the area (Old Norse: Breiðefni). The first element is breiðr which means "broad". The last element is efni which means "state" or "condition". Throughout the centuries, the name changed through misunderstandings and corruptions of the word and it changed to Breiheim or Breidem, where the second element of the name became like the old word heimr meaning "home". The current spelling of the name was settled upon by the 1800s.

=== Churches ===
The Church of Norway had one parish (sokn) within Breim Municipality. At the time of the municipal dissolution, it was part of the Gloppen prestegjeld and the Nordfjord prosti (deanery) in the Diocese of Bjørgvin.

Churches in Breim Municipality
| Parish (sokn) | Church name | Location of the church | Year built |
|---|---|---|---|
| Breim | Breim Church | Re | 1886 |

== Geography ==
Breim Municipality was located to the east of Gloppen Municipality, south of Stryn Municipality and the Utvik mountains, west of the Jostedalsbreen glacier, and north of Jølster Municipality. The municipality was centered on the lake Breimsvatn. Many of the inhabitants lived on the shores of the lake or in the large river valley extending east from the lake. The highest point in the municipality was the 1,826.59-metre (5,992.7 ft) tall mountain Snønipa, which was on the border with Jølster Municipality.

== Government ==
While it existed, Breim Municipality was responsible for primary education (through 10th grade), outpatient health services, senior citizen services, welfare and other social services, zoning, economic development, and municipal roads and utilities. The municipality was governed by a municipal council of directly elected representatives. The mayor was indirectly elected by a vote of the municipal council. The municipality was under the jurisdiction of the Gulating Court of Appeal.

=== Municipal council ===
The municipal council (Heradsstyre) of Breim Municipality was made up of 17 representatives that were elected to four year terms. The tables below show the historical composition of the council by political party.

Breim heradsstyre 1959–1963
| Party name (in Nynorsk) | Number of representatives |
|---|---|
| Local List(s) (Lokale lister) | 17 |
| Total number of members: | 17 |
Note: On 1 January 1964, Breim Municipality became part of Gloppen Municipality.

Breim heradsstyre 1955–1959
| Party name (in Nynorsk) | Number of representatives |
|---|---|
| Labour Party (Arbeidarpartiet) | 3 |
| Christian Democratic Party (Kristeleg Folkeparti) | 2 |
| Farmers' Party (Bondepartiet) | 8 |
| Local List(s) (Lokale lister) | 4 |
| Total number of members: | 17 |

Breim heradsstyre 1951–1955
| Party name (in Nynorsk) | Number of representatives |
|---|---|
| Local List(s) (Lokale lister) | 16 |
| Total number of members: | 16 |

Breim heradsstyre 1947–1951
| Party name (in Nynorsk) | Number of representatives |
|---|---|
| Labour Party (Arbeidarpartiet) | 1 |
| Christian Democratic Party (Kristeleg Folkeparti) | 1 |
| Local List(s) (Lokale lister) | 14 |
| Total number of members: | 16 |

Breim heradsstyre 1945–1947
| Party name (in Nynorsk) | Number of representatives |
|---|---|
| Local List(s) (Lokale lister) | 16 |
| Total number of members: | 16 |

Breim heradsstyre 1937–1941*
| Party name (in Nynorsk) | Number of representatives |
|---|---|
| Labour Party (Arbeidarpartiet) | 3 |
| Farmers' Party (Bondepartiet) | 9 |
| Liberal Party (Venstre) | 2 |
| Local List(s) (Lokale lister) | 2 |
| Total number of members: | 16 |
Note: Due to the German occupation of Norway during World War II, no elections were held for new municipal councils until after the war ended in 1945.

=== Mayors ===
The mayor (Nynorsk: ordførar) of Breim Municipality was the political leader of the municipality and the chairperson of the municipal council. The following people have held this position:

- 1886–1913: Jakob J. Myklebust, Sr. (V)
- 1913–1920: Rasmus R. Bogstad
- 1921–1931: Jakob J. Myklebust, Jr.
- 1932–1937: Ivar J. Seime
- 1938–1940: Jakob J. Myklebust, Jr.
- 1942–1945: Ingebrikt Sandal
- 1945–1947: Jakob J. Myklebust, Jr.
- 1948–1956: Johnny Bakke (V)
- 1956–1958: Rasmus Sandal
- 1958–1960: Einar Strand
- 1960–1964: Olav B. Bø

== See also ==
- List of former municipalities of Norway
