= Rolf-Erik Nystrøm =

Norwegian musician and composer

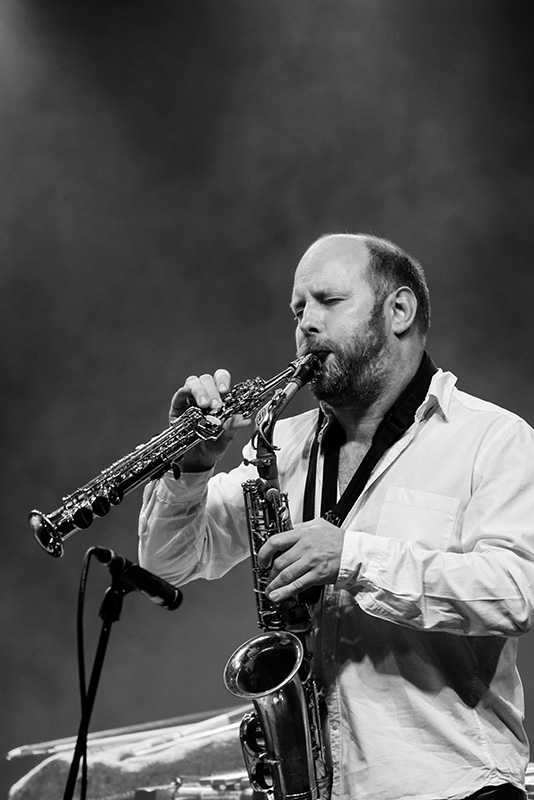
- At Aarhus Festival, Denmark 2018

Background information
- Born: 23 April 1975 (age 50); Oslo
- Origin: Norway
- Genres: Jazz
- Occupations: Musician, composer, arranger, music teacher
- Instrument: Saxophone
- Website: www.rolferiknystrom.com

Rolf-Erik Nystrøm (born 23 April 1975) is a Norwegian saxophonist and composer in the field of contemporary music.

== Career ==
Nystrøm has a diploma of music from the Norwegian Academy of Music and is now a lecturer in the art of improvisation based contemporary music.

He has been soloist with the Norwegian Symphony Orchestra and the Basel Symphony Orchestra and the Swedish Radio Symphony Orchestra. He has been with the bands like Poing, Dozo, Hero og Zanussi five and participated in about 50 recordings in various musical genres.

In 1994 he went to the finals of the Norwegian TV show Talentiaden and in 1998 he was soloist with Bergen Philharmonic Orchestra in the Saxophne conserto by Bjørn Kruse.

In 2006 he released his first solo album, Concepts of Sorrow & Dangers on the record company Aurora. The album was nominated for the 2006 Spellemannprisen class contemporary music. As a composer, he has written music for stage, television documentaries and chamber.

In 2013 he wrote and performed music along with the Munor ensemble to the 1911 Italian film L'Inferno at Tysværtunet social center at "Tysvær skrekkfest" (Tysvær horrorfilmfestival).

== Honors ==
- 2001: Rikskonsertene's launch support
- 2005: Youth Lindemanpris
- 2006: Statens arbeidsstipend

== Discography (in selection) ==
=== Solo albums ===
- 2006: Concepts Of Sorrows & Dangers (Aurora Records)

=== Collaborations ===
With Zanussi 5

- 2004: Zanussi Five (Moserobie Prod)
- 2007: Alborado (Moserobie Prod)
- 2010: Ghost Dance (Moserobie Prod)
- 2014: Live In Coimbra (Clean Feed)

Duo HERO with Helge Lien

- 2005: Prøysen – musikken fra dokumentaren (Jazzavdelingen) nominated for the Edvard Prize in 2005
- 2006: The Discovery & Exploration of Planet HERO (Jazzaway)

Paul Hindemith compositions performed by Henninge Landaas, Vegard Landaas, Elzbieta Nawrocka and Bjørg Lewis

- 2009: The Golden Hindemith: Chamber Music For VIola & Saxophone (Lawo Classics)

With Unni Løvlid and Becaye Aw

- 2009: Seven Winds (Heilo Music)
