= Real Ones =

Norwegian rock band

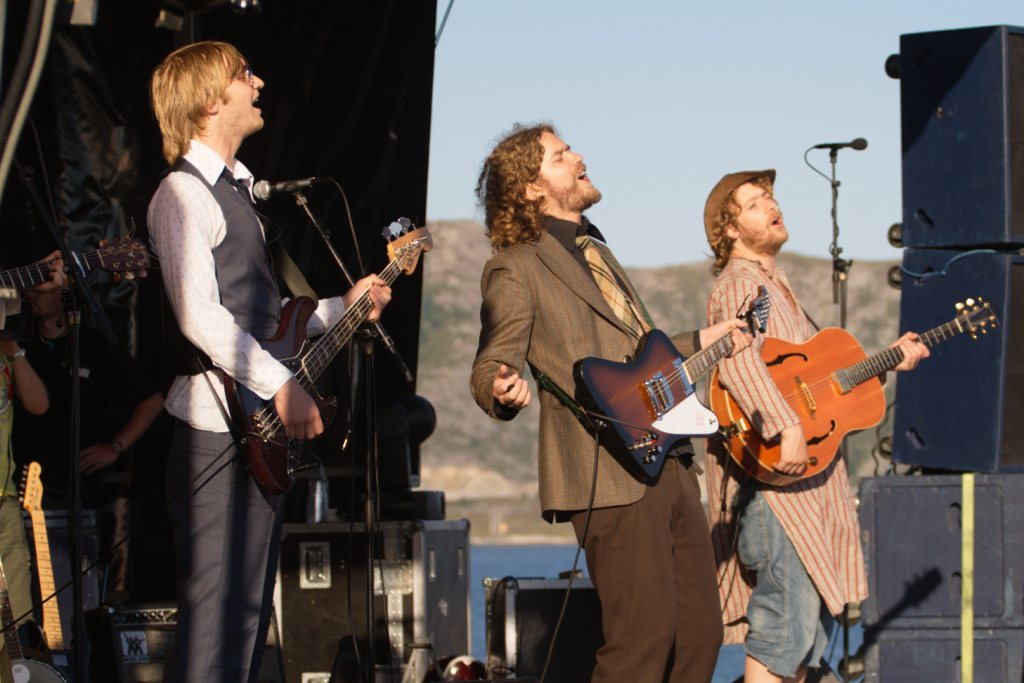
- Real Ones live

Background information
- Origin: Bergen, Hordaland
- Genres: Folk/rock
- Years active: 1994–present
- Labels: Breaking Records
- Members: Ivar Vogt; Jørgen Sandvik; Kåre Opheim; Øystein Skjælaaen; David Vogt
- Past members: Yrjan Tangenes; Thomas Lønnheim
- Website: www.realones.no

Real Ones, also known as Reelones, is a folk/rock band from Bergen, Norway. The band was formed in 1994. Band members include Ivar Vogt (vocals, guitar, ukulele, saxophone), Jørgen Sandvik (vocals, guitar, banjo, sitar), Kåre Opheim (drums, backing vocals), Øystein Skjælaaen (bass, backing vocals), and David Vogt (vocals, violin, organ). 1994-2009 Yrjan Tangenes provided vocals, percussion, and bodhrán, and Thomas Lønnheim played percussion in 1999–2000. The band was formed when Vogt and Sandvik were 14 and 15 years of age.

== Biography ==
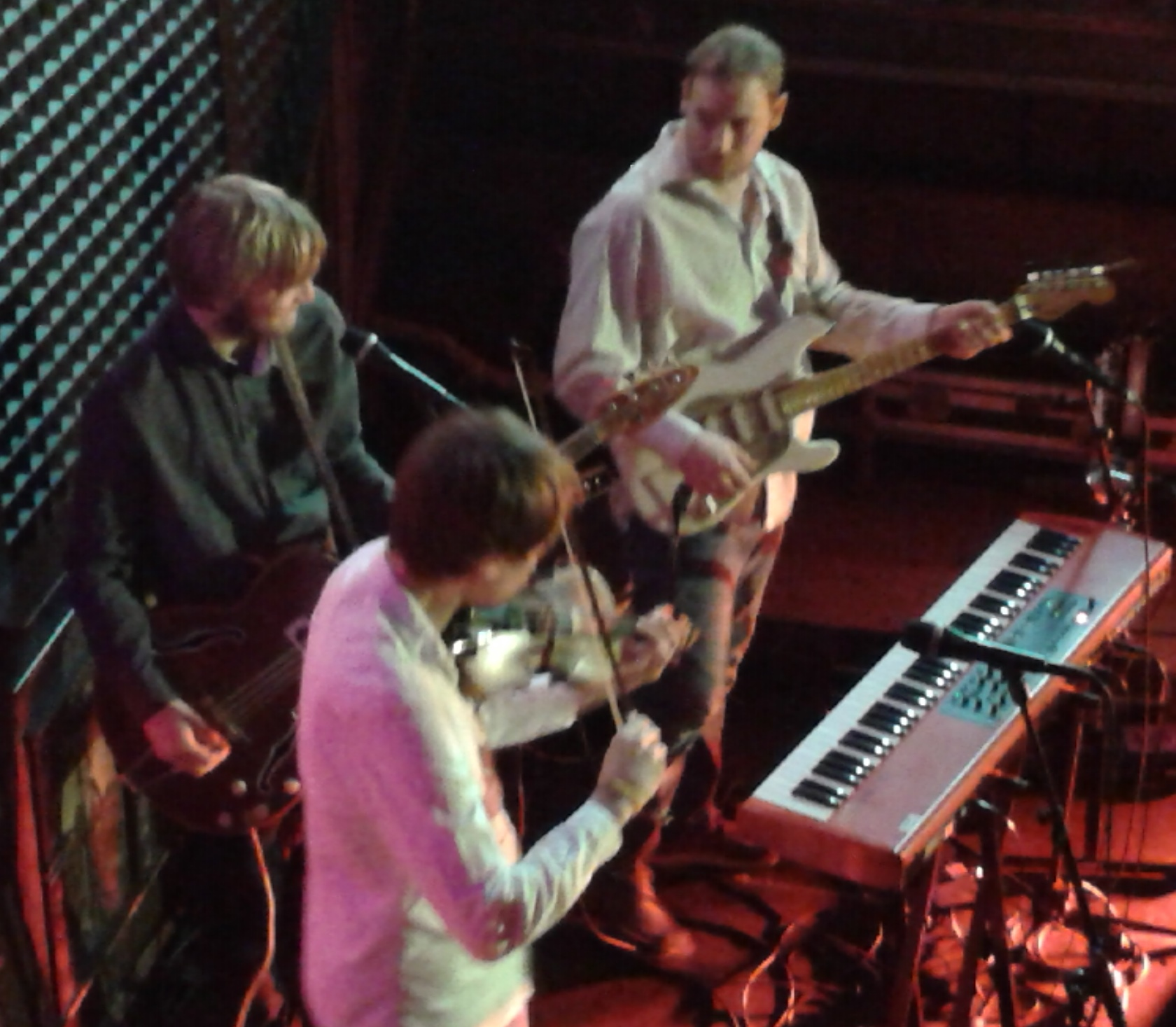
Real Ones at Vossajazz 2015.

The ensemble, who normally sing English lyrics, makes music that can be characterized as folk-rock or melodic pop, but is also influenced by psychedelia and oriental music. According to a review by VG represents plate Home with the Girls in the Morning a result that is "... a beautiful, cohesive and melodic album of the rustic, organic and harmonic variety. Real Ones writes beautiful and atmospheric songs full of gorgeous instrumental detail."

On opening night at the Kongsberg Jazzfestival in 2005, the band played together on the same stage with the singer Ole Paus. The band received the 2008 Spellemannprisen for Best Pop Album for All for the Neighbourhood. Palm Sunday 2015 Real Ones accompanied by Sigbjørn Apeland, performed the Misa Criolla at Voss Church during the Vossajazz festival.

== Honors ==
- 2008: Spellemannprisen in the category Pop music, for the album All for the Neighbourhood
- 2013: Spellemannprisen in the category Pop music, for the album Tonight Only Tonight / The Morning After

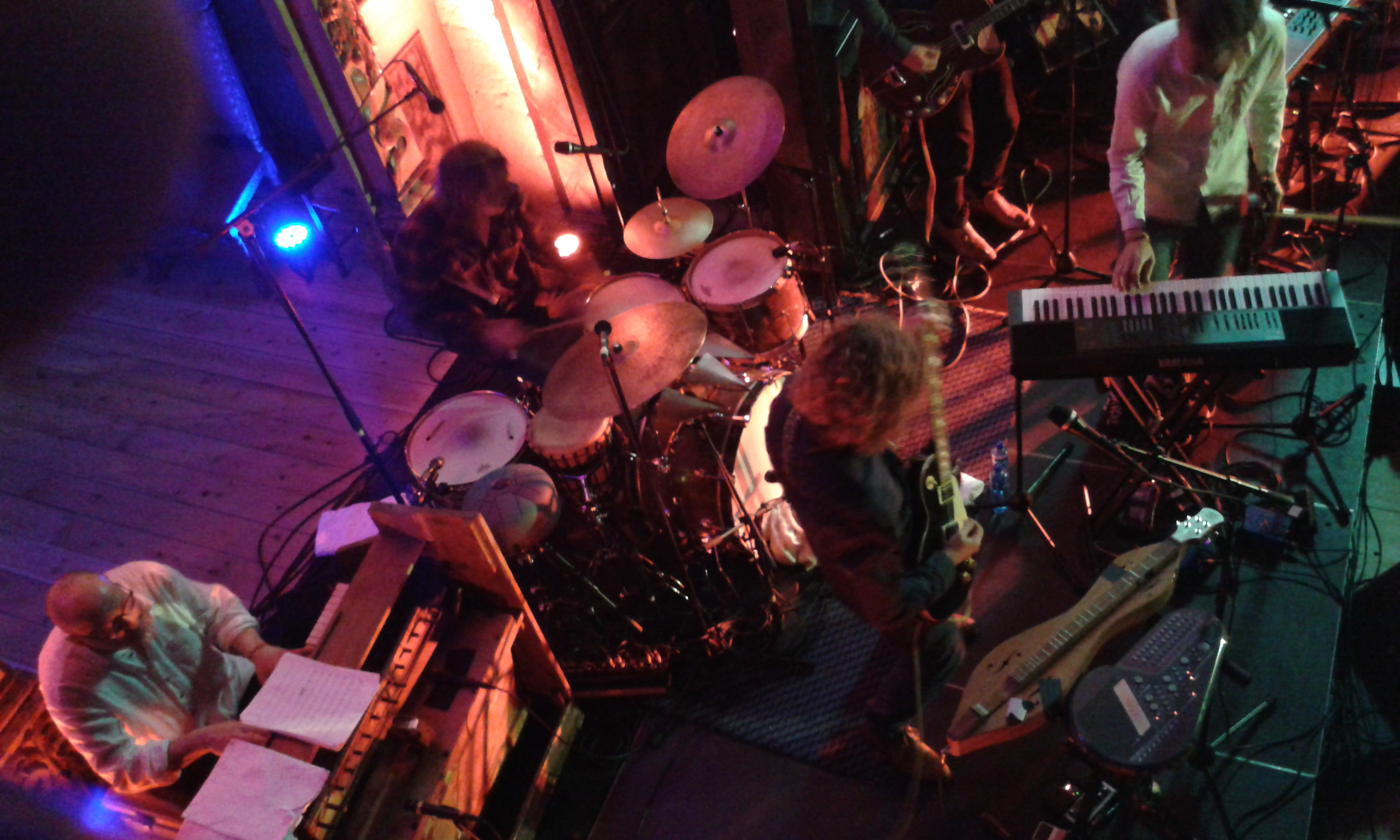
Sigbjørn Apeland and the Real Ones at Vossajazz 2015.

== Discography ==
- 1997: Comments From the Cheap Seats (New Records)
- 2002: Bratislava EP (New Records) (Reached 14th place on the charts)
- 2003: This is Camping (New Records)
- 2005: Home With the Girls in the Morning (Breaking Records)
- 2008: All for the Neighbourhood (Warner Music)
- 2009: Ekko (Instrumental Opus 1) (Warner Music )
- 2011: First Night on Earth (Warner Music)
- 2012: Real Ones & The Extended Family (Breaking Records)
- 2013: Tonight Only Tonight / The Morning After (Breaking Records)
- 2014: Misa Criolla (Breaking Records)
- 2018: Hey Future, Hey Past (Breaking Records)
- 2019: LIVE (Breaking Records)
- 2023: Love Your Mother (Breaking Records)

Awards
Preceded by Superfamily	Recipient of the best Pop band Spellemannprisen; 2008	Succeeded by Montée
Preceded by Karpe Diem	Recipient of the best Pop band Spellemannprisen; 2013	Succeeded by Highasakite
