= Nils Økland (musician) =

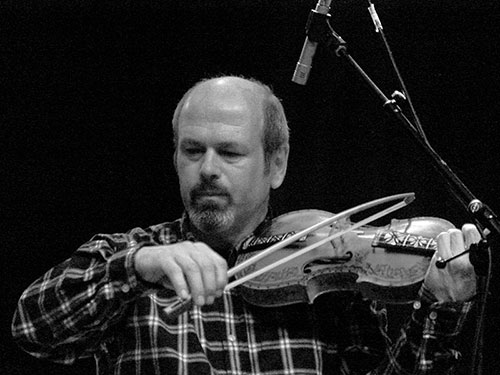
- Nils Økland in Aarhus, Denmark 2013

Background information
- Born: 7 January 1961 (age 65)
- Origin: Norway
- Genres: Traditional Norwegian music; contemporary music; jazz
- Occupations: Musician; composer
- Instruments: Hardanger fiddle, violin, viola d'amore
- Labels: Hubro Music; Hot Club; NorCD; ECM
- Website: www.nilsokland.no

Nils Økland (born 7 January 1961) is a Norwegian Hardanger fiddle player known as a bridge builder between contemporary music and folk music, and the brother of the musician Torbjørn Økland.

== Biography ==
Økland performed with the short-lived musical group Løver og Tigre ("Lions and Tigers," 1983), with Balkansemblet (1984-1995 and 2005-) and in a duo along with jazz bassist Bjørnar Andresen (Hot Club Records, 1986). Along with Arvid Gangsø and Jorun Hafstad he played in the trio Skinn og Bein ("Skin and Bones," which recorded Knaus — en samtidscollage (contemporary rock, Hot Club Records, 1989). Along with the improvisational band Supersilent he appeared on BBC Radio 3's broadcast The Wire Sessions Live (2000), where the concert program described Økland as a "virtuoso of the traditional Hardanger fiddle with a solo set that lights up the grey area separating folk forms from free improvisation and modern composition."

After the solo recording Blå harding (Morild, 1996), he recorded Straum ("Stream", Rune Grammofon, 2000) along with organist and ethnomusicologist Sigbjørn Apeland on the harmonium, brother Torbjørn Økland on guitar, Pål Thorstensen on bass and vocalist Åsne Valland Nordli. Bris, a recent recording ("Breeze," Rune Grammofon, 2004) which featured his own compositions, was a collaboration with Sigbjørn Apeland, Mats Eilertsen on bass, Per Oddvar Johansen on drums and Håkon Mørch Stene on percussion. Portions of the recording were Økland's music for Jon Fosse's play Melankolika, a play based on the tragic life of the artist Lars Hertervig (1830-1902).

As conductor at the Ole Bull Academy for six years, Økland organized Concerts Norway, an initiative to regularly perform quality music on a very intensive schedule throughout Norway. He collaborated on several recordings with jazz musician Christian Wallumrød's ensemble and, with Berit Opheim (vocals) and Bjørn Kjellemyr (bass), recorded for the trio BNB. Økland has also played on CDs issued by Benedicte Maurseth, Knut Hamre, Kari Bremnes, Alf Cranner, Karoline Krüger and Hans Fredrik Jacobsen.

== Discography (in selection) ==
=== Solo albums ===
- 1996: Blå Harding (Morild)
- 2000: Straum (Rune Grammofon)
- 2004: Bris (Rune Grammofon)
- 2009: Monograph (ECM)
- 2015: Kjølvatn (ECM)
- 2017: Lysning (Hubro)

=== Collaborations ===
With Bjørnar Andresen

- 1986: Nils Økland/Bjørnar Andresen (Hot Club)

Within Skinn og Bein

- 1989: Knaus (Hot Club)

Within 1982, including Sigbjørn Apeland and Øyvind Skarbø

- 2009: 1982 (NorCD)
- 2017: Chromola (Heilo Music)

With Sigbjørn Apeland

- 2011: Lysøen - Hommage À Ole Bull (ECM)

With Knut Hamre, Benedicte Maurseth, Philippe Pierlot and Elisabeth Seitz

- 2012: Anima (Heilo Music)

With Georg Buljo

- 2014: Neve (Duippidit)

With Lumen Drones

- 2014: Lumen Drones (ECM)

With Linus

- 2016: Felt Like Old Folk (Smeraldina-Rima), featuring Niels Van Heertum
