= Breim Church =

Church in Vestland, Norway

- Breim kyrkje
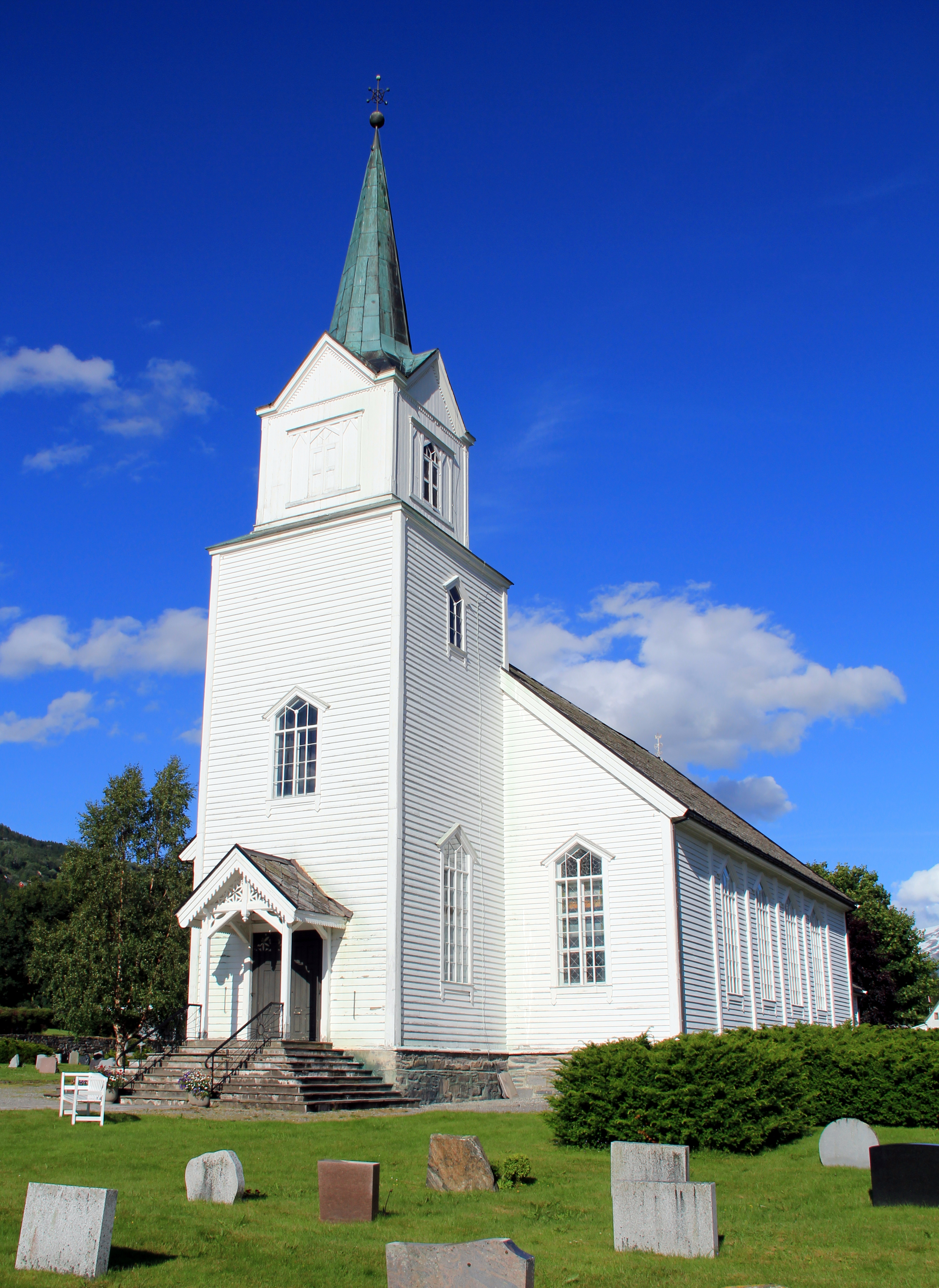
- View of the church
- Breim Church
- 61°44′01″N 6°24′29″E
- Location: Gloppen Municipality, Vestland
- Country: Norway
- Denomination: Church of Norway
- Churchmanship: Evangelical Lutheran

History
- Status: Parish church
- Founded: 13th century
- Consecrated: 9 July 1886

Architecture
- Functional status: Active
- Architect: Haakon Thorsen
- Architectural type: Long church
- Completed: 1886 (140 years ago)

Specifications
- Capacity: 500
- Materials: Wood

Administration
- Diocese: Bjørgvin bispedømme
- Deanery: Nordfjord prosti
- Parish: NAME
- Norwegian Cultural Heritage Site
- Type: Church
- Status: Listed
- ID: 83947

Breim Church (Norwegian: Breim kyrkje) is a parish church of the Church of Norway in Gloppen Municipality in Vestland county, Norway. It is located in the village of Re on the shore of the lake Breimsvatnet. It is the church for the Breim parish which is part of the Nordfjord prosti (deanery) in the Diocese of Bjørgvin. The white, wooden church was built in a long church style in 1886 by the architect Haakon Thorsen. The church seats about 500 people.

== History ==
The earliest existing historical records of the church date back to the year 1308, but it was not new at that time. The original church at Re was likely a wooden stave church located at Hetle, about 500 metres (1,600 ft) northwest of the present church site. The first church here was likely built during the 13th century. In 1334, there was a fire in the church rectory. In 1620, the medieval church was torn down and replaced with a new timber-framed cruciform church. That building was poorly constructed, and it was replaced by a new cruciform church in 1667. In the 1880s, it was decided to tear down the old church so that a new, larger church could be built. It was also decided that the church should be moved a short distance to the southeast so that it would be more centrally located in the village. This new church was completed in 1886, the same year that the Breim parish was separated from Gloppen to become a separate municipality. The new church was consecrated on 9 July 1886 by Bishop Fredrik Waldemar Hvoslef. The old church was torn down in 1887. The new church was a wooden long church with a 22-by-15-metre (72 ft × 49 ft) nave and a 8.1-by-6-metre (27 ft × 20 ft) choir.

== Media gallery ==
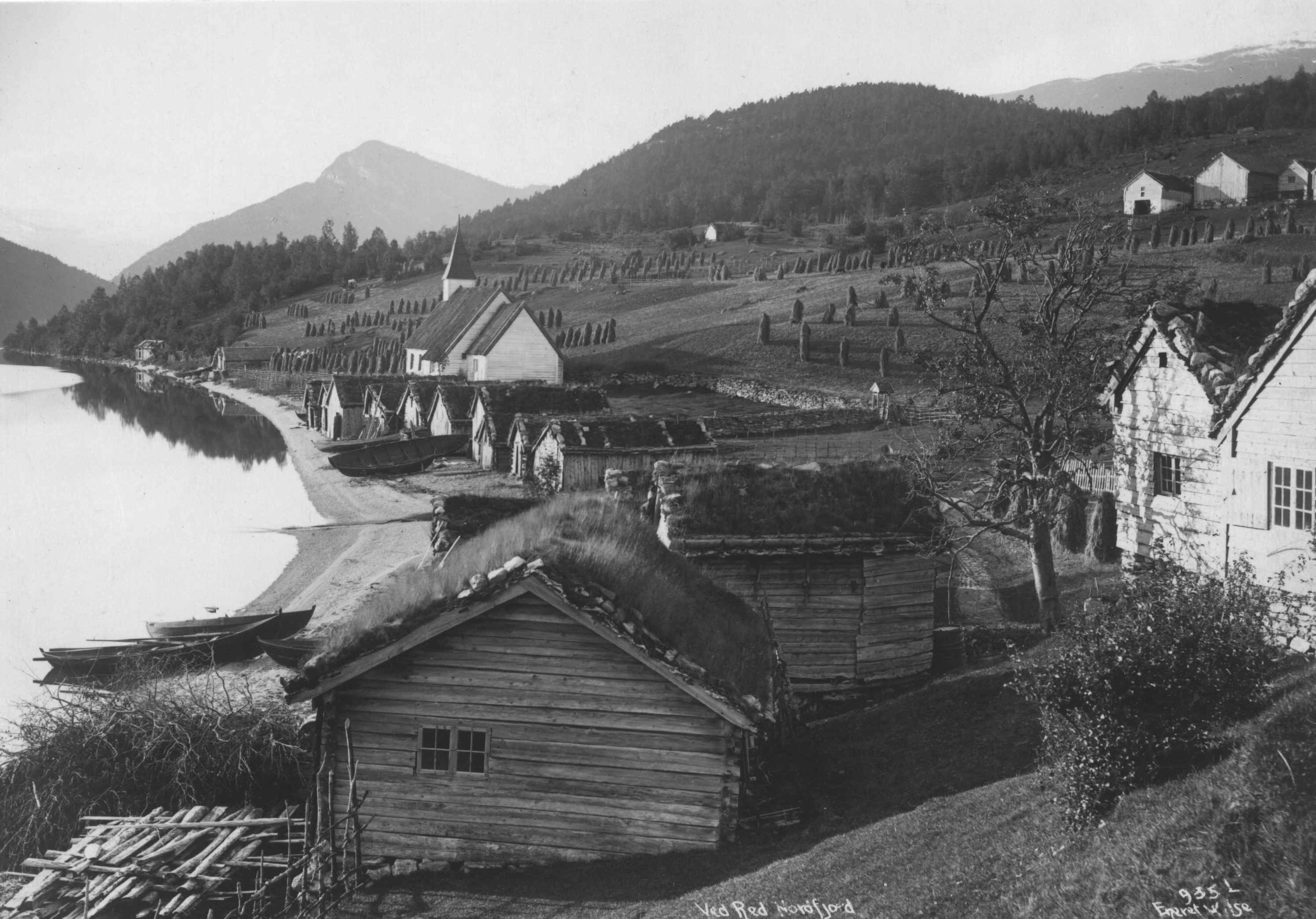
View of the old church (1667-1887)

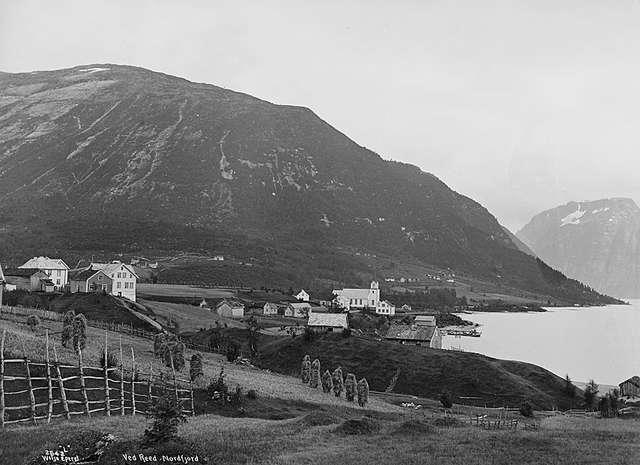
View of the new church from the site of the old church (c. 1890)

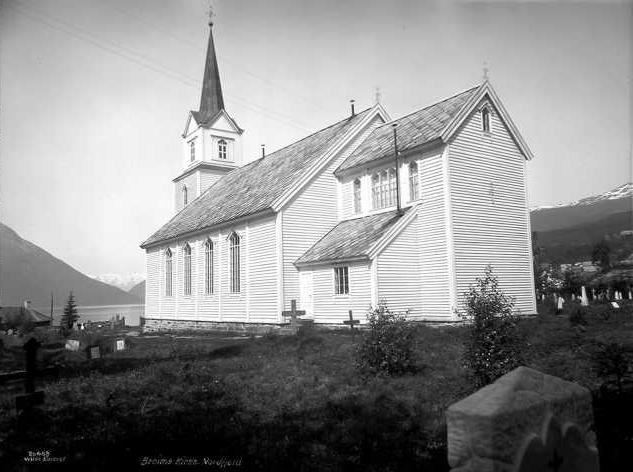
View of the present church (c. 1926)

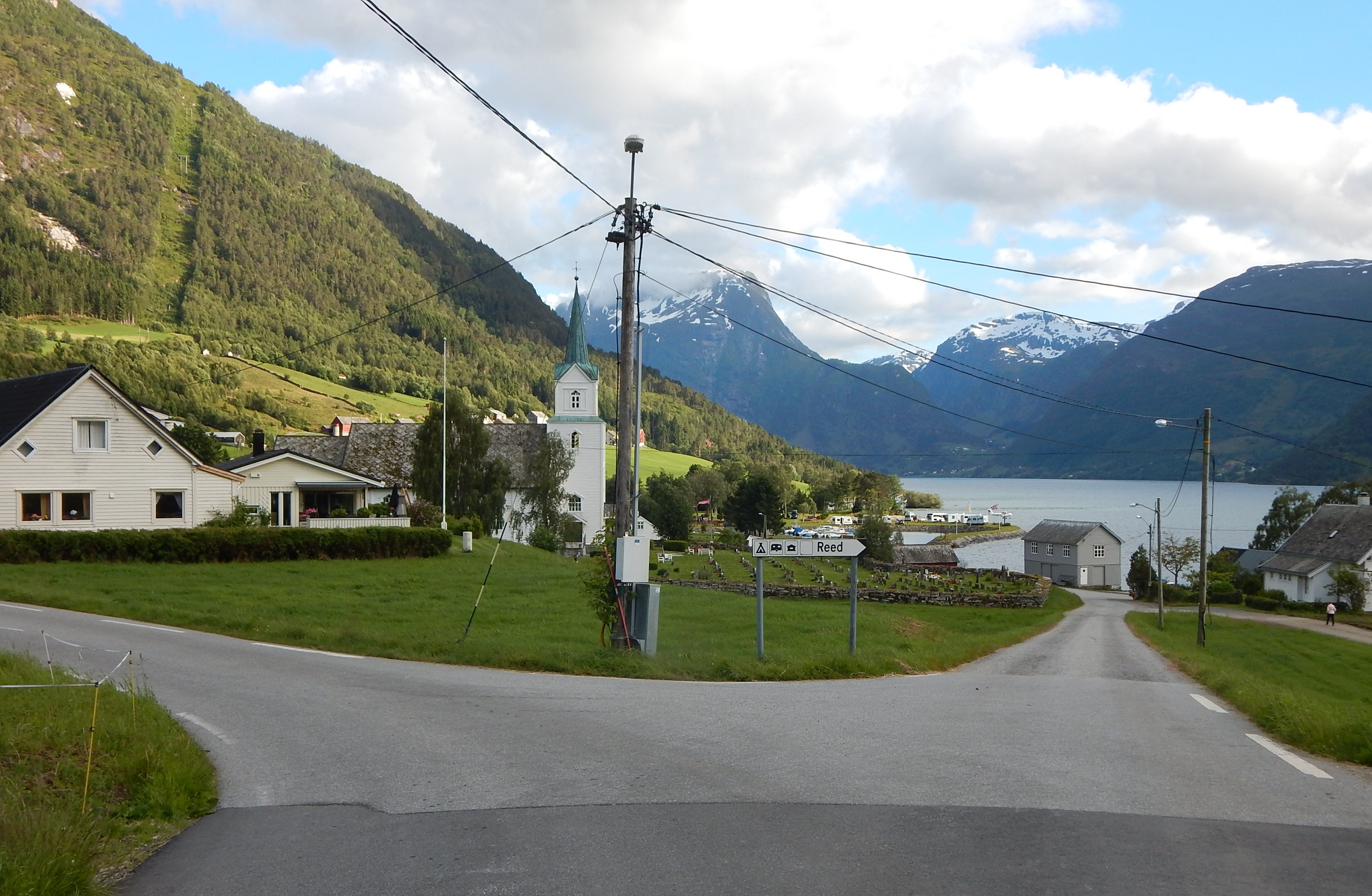
View of the present church (2017)

== See also ==
- List of churches in Bjørgvin
