= Come Shine =

Norwegian jazz band

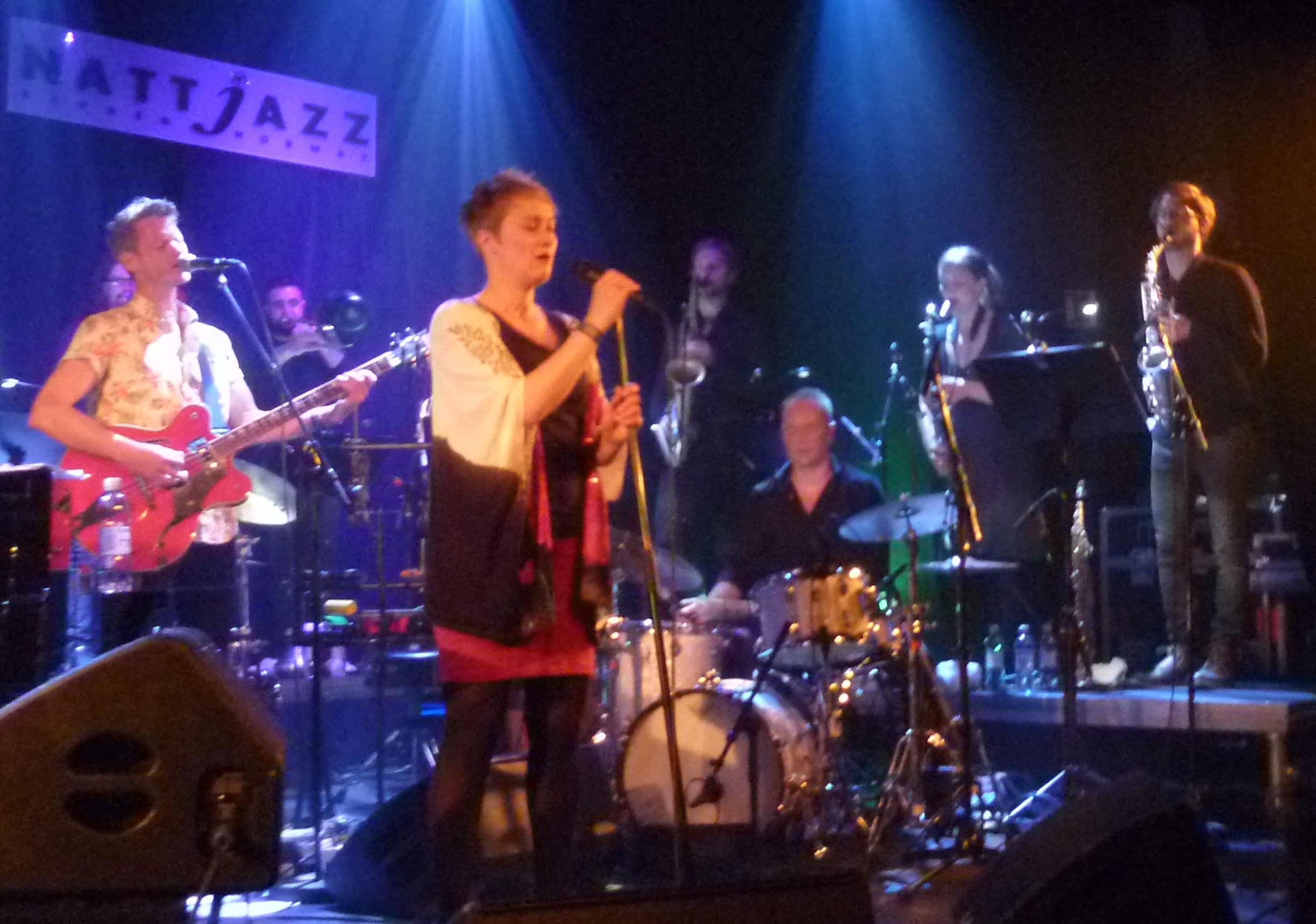
- Come Shine with TJO at Nattjazz in Bergen, Norway 2016.

Background information
- Origin: Norway
- Genres: Jazz
- Years active: 2001–present
- Labels: Jazzland Recordings; Curling Legs
- Members: Erlend Skomsvoll; Håkon Mjåset Johansen; Sondre Meisfjord; Live Maria Roggen
- Website: www.comeshine.com

Come Shine is a Norwegian jazz band, established 2001 in Trondheim.

== Biography ==
Their eponymously titled debut album was released in 2001 on Curling Legs, and was followed by a later studio album, Do Do That Voodoo, and a live album, Come Shine with the Norwegian Radio Orchestra in Concert.

Come Shine has a long history at the Kongsberg Jazz Festival, where they this summer again is on the playlist. They also played at the Norwegian National Jazz Scene, Victoria, in Oslo.

== Personnel ==
- Erlend Skomsvoll - piano
- Håkon Mjåset Johansen - drums
- Sondre Meisfjord - bass
- Live Maria Roggen - vocals

== Discography ==
=== Albums ===
- 2001: Come Shine (Curling Legs)
- 2002: Do Do That Voodoo (Curling Legs)
- 2003: Come Shine with the Norwegian Radio Orchestra in Concert (Curling Legs)
- 2014: Red and Gold (Jazzland)
- 2016: Norwegian Caravan(Lawoo Classics)

Awards
Preceded by Urban Connection	Recipient of the Jazz Spellemannprisen; 2002	Succeeded by Atomic
