= Fliflet/Hamre =

Norwegian musical duo

- Origin: Bergen, Norway
- Genres: Jazz; Traditional music
- Years active: 1991–present
- Label: Lahrmsteiner Elite
- Members: Gabriel Fliflet; Ole Hamre
- Website: "Heme" Official Website

Fliflet/Hamre (established 1991 in Bergen, Norway) Norwegian traditional music duo comprising Gabriel Fliflet and Ole Hamre. Their original name presented at Nattjazz in 1991, was Fliflet/Hamre Energiforsyning (1991–99). The duo led the TV series «Fliflet/Hamre kraftakvarium» at NRK (1996) and has released several albums on their own label Lahrmsteiner Elite. They also initiated the Quartet «Fri Flyt» (1993–2001).

Together with the folk artist Jan Eggum, Fliflet/Hamre created the show En tragisk aften, and has directed for numerous concert performances, including «Vestland, Festland, Bestland», where among others Runar Gudnason attended and holds the annual performance «Fliflet/Hamre morer julen inn».

In 2010 they presented a show at «Oslo Jazzfestival» along with the jazz band «Christianssand String Swing Ensemble»

== Band members ==
- Gabriel Fliflet - accordion
- Ole Hamre - percussion

== Discography ==
- 1994: Ivar Aasen goes Bulgaria (Lahrstermer Elite)
- 1997: Moro post mortem – live (Vossajazz Records), live from the show "Energivar"
- 1999: Gabriole (Lahrstermer Elite), with Kari Bremnes and Peter Bastian
- 2004: Eine kleine kraftmusik (Lahrstermer Elite), with Knut Reiersrud
