= Unni Løvlid =

Norwegian musician (born 1976)

- Born: 23 March 1976 (age 49); Hornindal Municipality, Nordfjord
- Origin: Sogn og Fjordane, Norway
- Genres: Folk, traditional music
- Occupation: Musician
- Instrument(s): Piano, fiddle
- Years active: 1997 – present
- Labels: Heilo
- Website: www.unni.no

Unni Løvlid (born 23 March 1976) is a Norwegian musician. She was raised in Hornindal Municipality in Sogn og Fjordane county, where she was taught to play piano, fiddle, and Hardanger fiddle. Her interest in folk music was initiated by her mother, Oline Ragnhild Løvlid who taught her about the traditional music of Nordfjord.

== Career ==
After studying music at Firda gymnas, Unni went to the Toneheim folkehøyskole at Hamar. She continued her musical studies at the Norwegian Academy of Music. In 2007, she won the Gammleng-prisen in the folk music class.

Together with Sigrid Moldestad and Liv Merete Kroken, she started the stage and cabaret trio Fjøgl. They set up three performances in 2001–2004, among them they were of one of the draws at The international folklore festival in Forde 2001.

== Discography ==
=== Solo albums ===
Unni Løvlid Ensemble

- 1999: So ro liten tull (Personal Label)
- 2005: Vita (Heilo)
- 2008: Rite (Grappa)
- 2013: Lux (Heilo)

=== Collaborations ===
- 2009: Seven Winds (Heilo), with Becaye Aw & Rolf-Erik Nystrøm

=== Compilations ===
- 2009: Når Eg Står Her På Dei Høge Nutar, with various artists
- 2012: Nordic Woman (Heilo), with various artists

=== Unni Løvlid also appears on ===
- 1997: Ingunn Linge Valdal og Knut Ivar Bøe: Ferdafolk
- 2000: Hornindalstausene: Frie former
- 2001: Norsk folkemusikk og folkedans
- 2002: Rusk
- 2002: Listen – The Art of Arne Nordheim
- 2005: Bridges: Live in China
- 2006: Rusk II
- 2006: Gjenklang
- 2006: Draumkvedet (Arne Nordheim)
- 2011: Beginner's Guide to Scandinavia
