= Reed, Vestland =

Village in Gloppen Municipality, Norway

Reed Re
- Village
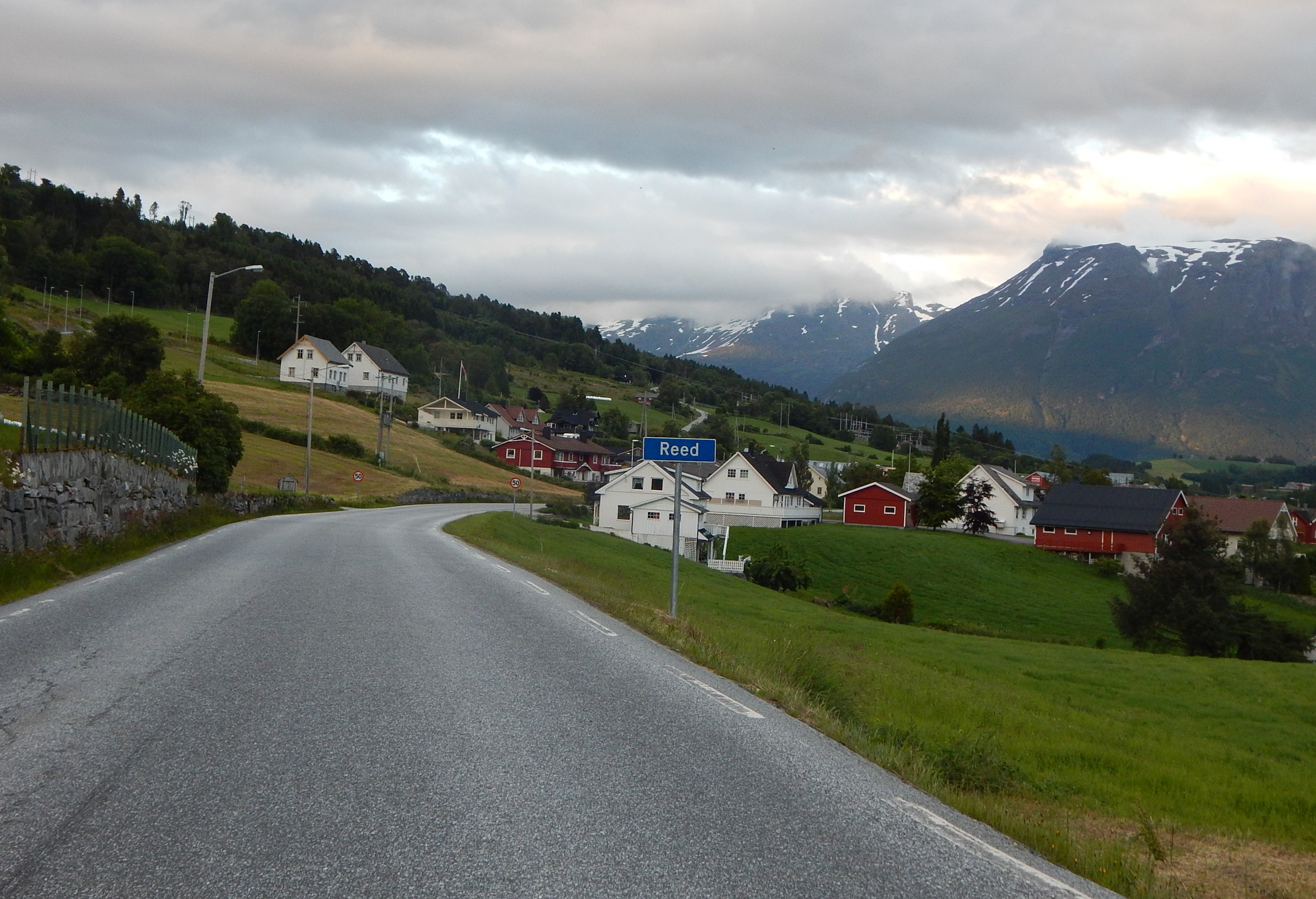
- Reed from the west
- Interactive map of Reed; Re
- Location within Vestland Location within Norway
- Coordinates: 61.73775°N 6.40945°E
- Country: Norway
- Region: Western Norway
- County: Vestland
- District: Nordfjord
- Municipality: Gloppen Municipality

Area
  - Total: 0.43 km^{2} (0.17 sq mi)
- Elevation: 82 m (269 ft)

Population (2023)
  - Total: 389
  - Density: 905/km^{2} (2,340/sq mi)
- Time zone: UTC+01:00 (CET)
  - Summer (DST): UTC+02:00 (CEST)
- Post Code: 6827 Breim

Reed or Re is a village in Gloppen Municipality in Vestland county, Norway. The village is located on the eastern shore of the lake Breimsvatnet, along the European route E39 highway, about 5 kilometres (3.1 mi) west of the village of Byrkjelo and about 12 kilometres (7.5 mi) southeast of the municipal centre of Sandane.

The 0.43-square-kilometre (110-acre) village had a population (2023) of 389 and a population density of 905 inhabitants per square kilometre (2,340/sq mi). Since 2023, the population and area data for this village area has not been separately tracked by Statistics Norway.

== History ==
Re was the administrative centre of the old Breim Municipality which existed from 1886 to 1964. Breim Church and Reed School are both located in the village.

== See also ==
- Eurofoto
