= Grieg Academy =

Music department at the University of Bergen

Coordinates: 60°23′21.26″N 5°19′32.94″E

The Grieg Academy - Department of Music is a department in the University of Bergen's Faculty of Fine Art, Music and Design (KMD) that offers degrees at BA, MA and PhD level, and conducts research in music performance, composition and music therapy.

== History ==
The Grieg Academy was founded as the Bergen Music Academy in 1905 by violinist Torgrim Castberg with the support of Edvard Grieg. The academy had around 175 student places at start-up. In 1932 the Bergen Music Academy changed its name to Bergen Conservatory of Music. In 1995, the conservatory joined the University of Bergen as a department within the Faculty of Humanities, and took the name Grieg Academy.

== Location and education ==
The Grieg Academy has premises in Nygård school in the centre of Bergen. Construction on a new building for the Academy began in 2025, after several years of fighting to get the new building funded. The Grieg Academy has just under 300 study places and around 80 employees. As of 2026, the Head of Department is Geir Davidsen.

The Grieg Academy offers higher education at BA, MA and PhD level in music performance (classical, traditional music, jazz), composition, practical-pedagogical education (PPU), music therapy and musicology. The Grieg Academy also has a talent program - the Grieg Academy's young talents (GUT) - for students aged 13-19. The Grieg Academy are administering the Grieg Research School in interdisciplinary music studies, in collaboration with the Western Norway University of Applied Sciences, the University of Stavanger, the University of Agder and the Volda University College. (GAMUT) – The Grieg Academy Music Therapy Research Centre is run together with NORCE and the Centre for Grieg Research is a collaboration with KODE. The Ole Bull Academy in Voss has study places in traditional music linked to the Grieg Academy and the folk music archive Arne Bjørndal Collection also belongs to the Grieg Academy.

== Alumni ==
- Lise Davidson, soprano
