= Ole Hamre =

Norwegian drummer (born 1959)

- Born: 10 October 1959 (age 66); Bergen, Hordaland, Norway
- Genres: Jazz
- Occupation: Musician
- Instrument: Drums
- Website: olehamre.no

Ole Hamre (born 20 October 1959) is a Norwegian drummer. He has worked with Bugge Wesseltoft, Kari Bremnes, Ole Paus, Ketil Bjørnstad, Frode Alnæs, Silje Nergaard, Arve Henriksen and Knut Reiersrud.

== Career ==
Hamre is known for his collaboration with accordionist Gabriel Fliflet, including the duo Fliflet/Hamre (1991–) and the music group Fri Fri Flyt (1993–2001). As a composer, he has written a number of commissioned works, music for film and television, vignettes, and the like. He has since 2006 organized OiOi-festivalen, an outdoor program under Festspillene i Bergen. OiOi stands for Experience, empathy, attention and insight, and the motto "Distinctive and popular" is the festival's main goal is to get more people to feel like a natural part of the Bergen International Festival.

Hamre is the initiator and artistic director of the multi-ethnic children and youth project Fargespill. The project has since 2005 produced the performances "Fargespill", "Fargelys" and "Flere farger". A total of 70 children and adolescents from 20 countries, all residents of Bergen, are actors on stage and the performances have had over 25,000 visitors. The show is composed of music and dances that the participants bring with them from their homeland, combined with the Norwegian folk music and dance, mixed with elements of modern global youth culture.

Hamre is also the man behind the human organ Folkofonen, an audiovisual instrument for communicating art consisting of video and sound of people singing a long tone. Folkofonen has been presented at a number of occasions, such as the royal opening of the Trondheim Kammermusikkfestival 2007, the opening of Kulturminneåret 2009, NordWind-festivalen 2009 in Berlin, and interacting with Bergen Filharmoniske Orkester.

Kunst av næring is another of project of Hamre's. This is a joint concept between art life and business, where the idea is to create art of sound and images of specific industries. Within this concept, Hamre produced numerous audiovisual performances and films on behalf of the business community, among others Norsk Hydro, Statoil and "BIR".

== Honors ==
- Vossajazzprisen, 1993
- Statens arbeidsstipend for composers, 2006
- Hordaland fylkes kulturarbeiderpris in 2008
- Bergen kommunes kunstnerpris in 2008

== Discography ==
With Rust

- 1983: Rust (EMI)

With Son Mu (Knut Kristiansen)

- 1985: Son Mu (Hot Club)

With Claudio Latini & Cristina Latini

- 1990: Cor De Dendë (Bums)

With the Talisman Group

- 1991: Dating (Odin)
- 1995: Vardøger (Odin)

With Henry Kaiser & David Lindley

- 1994: The Sweet Sunny North (Shanachie)
- 1996: The Sweet Sunny North Vol. 2 (Shanachie)

With Fliflet/Hamre Energiforsyning

- 1994: Ivar Aasen Goes Bulgaria (Lahrmsteiner Elite)

Awards
Preceded by Dag Arnesen	Recipient of the Vossajazzprisen; 1993	Succeeded by Gabriel Fliflet
