= Knut Hamre =

Norwegian Hardanger fiddle player (born 1952)

Knut Hamre (born 3 March 1952) is a Norwegian Hardanger fiddle player.
