= Ole Bull Academy =

Music school in Bergen, Norway

Coordinates: 60.6301°N 6.4212°E

The Ole Bull Academy (Norwegian: Ole Bull Akademiet, established 1977 in Vossavangen, Norway) is a Norwegian music college that offers college-level courses on Norwegian folk music and folk dance. Today, the Academy educates about 700 students annually, and over 9000 students had taken a course at the Academy in 2003. Near the end of 2009 the figure was 12,000.

== Biography ==
The idea of an academy came from Ole Bull in 1863. He wished for an academy based on Norwegian folk music and a ballet inspired by Norwegian village dances. The idea was turned into reality by Sigbjørn Bernhoft Osa in 1977, First by course in the "slåttespill" for students at the Norges Musikkhøgskole and Bergen Musikkonservatorium. According to the website of the Academy, teaching follows the old principle from folk music: "From ear to ear, string to string, and throat to throat".

The teaching is organized in courses, usually by a week. A fixed two-year course for performers was established by Griegakademiet in 1996, leading to a bachelor's degree in combination with study points from the University of Bergen. In 2009, a bachelor's degree was started in Traditional dance with the RFF-center and NTNU. Study within education will be given by Stord/Haugesund University College. The Academy also collaborates with music education institutions in the Denmark, Sweden and Finland. Also, are granted teaching ethnology and music history, and international English language summer courses are held.

In collaboration with «Voss Spelemannslag» the Academy manages «Voss Folkemusikksamling». Furthermore publish the books and records, and runs music workshops. They hold the «Osafestivalen» every autumn and manage the fund and fiddle collection after Sigbjørn Bernhoft Osa. Furthermore, it owns and operates the student home «Kringsjå», developed containing the administration department, teaching rooms and concert hall in 1994, and in 2004, it was extended by several more teaching rooms, practice rooms and offices. The Academy is funded by Norwegian Ministry of Culture and Church Affairs, Hordaland County, and Voss Municipality. Rector in 2009 was Gunnar Stubseid, who led a staff of seven employees.
